= Conspiracy of silence (expression) =

"Culture of silence"

A conspiracy of silence, or culture of silence, describes the behavior of a group of people that by unspoken consensus does not mention, discuss, or acknowledge a given subject. The practice may be motivated by positive interest in group solidarity or by negative impulses such as fear of political repercussion or social ostracism. Unlike a taboo subject or the use of euphemisms, a conspiracy of silence is limited to specific social and political contexts rather than to an entire culture.

Some instances of such a practice are sufficiently well-known or enduring to become known by their own specific terms, including the code of silence, the refusal of law enforcement officers to speak out against crimes committed by fellow officers, and omertà, the cultural code of organized crime in Sicily.

Compare the Streisand effect, where deliberate efforts to suppress a particular topic or information result instead in increased awareness of the subject.

== Examples ==
Examples of the use of the term vary widely and include:

- An 1854 report on unrest in Hungary said the rulers of the Austrian Empire were powerless because "It cannot keep up its infamous rule, but by terror. There is a conspiracy without any doubt spread over the whole country–the conspiracy of silence and watchful expectation. ... [W]e will patiently await the right moment, and then rise as one man."
- In 1885, London's Pall Mall Gazette reported that prominent men were patronizing brothels. When authorities accused the paper of obscenity and tried to block its distribution, the paper's editors thanked them for "thereby breaking the conspiracy of silence maintained by the press concerning [their] revelations".
- The early lesbian novel The Well of Loneliness (1928) by Radclyffe Hall was written to "smash the conspiracy of silence" around homosexuality and the damage of that silence to the lives of LGBT people. The phrase would also be applicable to the banning of the book under UK censorship laws.
- A conference of social workers and medical personnel in 1936 urged greater efforts to prevent the spread of syphilis by New York City and state. An official of the federal government said they needed to bring the problems "out in the open" to overcome a "conspiracy of silence" that prevented public education efforts.
- On 19 March 1937, Pope Pius XI used the term in his encyclical Divini Redemptoris to characterize the failure of the non-Catholic press in Western Europe and the U.S. to cover the persecution of Christians in the Soviet Union, Mexico, and Spain.
- In 1945, British writer George Orwell published a novel about totalitarian life, Animal Farm. It soon became famous. He wrote a preface to the novel, but never published it. It first appeared in 1972. Orwell wrote:

The sinister fact about literary censorship in England is that it is largely voluntary. Unpopular ideas can be silenced, and inconvenient facts kept dark, without the need for any official ban. Anyone who has lived long in a foreign country will know of instances of sensational items of news—things which on their own merits would get the big headlines—being kept right out of the British press, not because the Government intervened but because of a general tacit agreement that "it wouldn't do" to mention that particular fact. ... At this moment what is demanded by the prevailing orthodoxy is an uncritical admiration of Soviet Russia. Everyone knows this, nearly everyone acts on it. Any serious criticism of the Soviet regime, any disclosure of facts which the Soviet Government would prefer to keep hidden, is next door to unprintable.

- Richard Shaull has described how Paulo Freire discovered the "culture of silence" in the foreword of the Pedagogy of the Oppressed. Paulo realized that the ignorance and lethargy in the life of poor and dispossessed are the direct product of the whole situation of economic, social, and political domination and of the paternalism of which they were the victims. Rather than being encouraged and equipped to know and respond to the concrete realities of the world, they were kept "submerged" in a situation in which such critical awareness and response were practically impossible. And it became clear to him that the whole educational system was one of the major instruments for the maintenance of this culture of silence.
- Between 1972 and 1994, members of the Charlestown community in Massachusetts were unwilling to share information that would facilitate homicide investigations because of their reliance on vigilante justice, fear of retaliation by criminals, and anti-police sentiment.
- The Conspiracy of Silence, a 1995 PBS documentary about domestic violence in the United States.
- Breaking the Conspiracy of Silence: Christian Churches and the Global AIDS Crisis (2006), a book criticizing the activities of Christian churches.
- Conspiracy of Silence, a 2004 film drama about the sexual activity of some Irish Roman Catholic clergy.
- Political adversaries, according to the New York Times in 2013, sometimes agree to avoid topics they all find difficult: "But on one topic, there was a conspiracy of silence: Republicans and Democrats agreed that they did not really want to talk about the Iraq war."
- Co-workers may avoid criticizing a colleague, for example, pilots not reporting another pilot's alcohol problem.
- An unspoken agreement of journalists and media outlets to suppress coverage of topics that their readers, advertisers, or sources prefer to avoid.
- Chris Lamb's Conspiracy of Silence: Sportswriters and the Long Campaign to Desegregate Baseball describes the consistent refusal of white sportswriters to report the decades-long efforts to integrate professional baseball in the United States.
- Men in positions of high power who have sexually harassed or assaulted women, children, and men in the U.S. were able to suppress the cases through financial settlements and nondisclosure agreements. The backlash against this practice starting in the entertainment industry in October 2017 became known as the Weinstein effect. Time magazine named the "Silence Breakers", the people who spoke out against sexual abuse and harassment, including the figureheads of the Me Too movement, as its 2017 Time Person of the Year.

== See also ==
- Agnotology
- Blue wall of silence
- Crowd psychology
- Esprit de corps
- Groupthink
- Memory hole
- Omertà
- Pact of forgetting
- Risk society
- Self-censorship
- Social control
- Spiral of silence
- Stop Snitchin'
- Turning a blind eye
