= Death of Sean Suiter =

Baltimore police detective

Sean Suiter
- Born: October 6, 1974; Washington, D.C., U.S.
- Died: November 16, 2017 (aged 43); Baltimore, Maryland, U.S.
- Education: McKinley Technology High School
- Police career
- Department: Baltimore Police Department
- Service years: 1999-2017
- Rank: Sworn in as an officer - 1999; Detective
- Military career
- Allegiance: United States
- Branch: United States Army
- Conflicts: Iraq War

On November 16, 2017, Sean Suiter (born October 6, 1974), a homicide detective with the Baltimore Police Department (BPD), was found dead with a shot in the head, a day before he was scheduled to give testimony in front of a federal grand jury concerning police corruption related to the Gun Trace Task Force scandal.

== Career and background ==
Suiter, 43, was an 18-year veteran of the Baltimore Police Department, and a United States Army veteran of the Iraq War. Colleagues have said Suiter was "an honest and beloved cop"; a neighbor described Suiter saying, "He was pleasant; had a smile on his face all the time. He looks young ... looks vibrant and has a great spirit about him." Suiter was given a hero's funeral and praised for his work as an officer. Former Baltimore Police Commissioner Kevin Davis said Suiter was not a target of the federal investigation around the Gun Trace Task Force. Suiter however, was connected earlier in his career to several members of the corrupt Gun Trace Task Force including Sgt. Wayne Jenkins, Detective Maurice Ward, and Detective Momodu Gondo, who each later pled guilty in the racketeering case. Gondo, a disgraced former detective, also told a jury that Suiter was corrupt and that they stole money together.

== Death ==
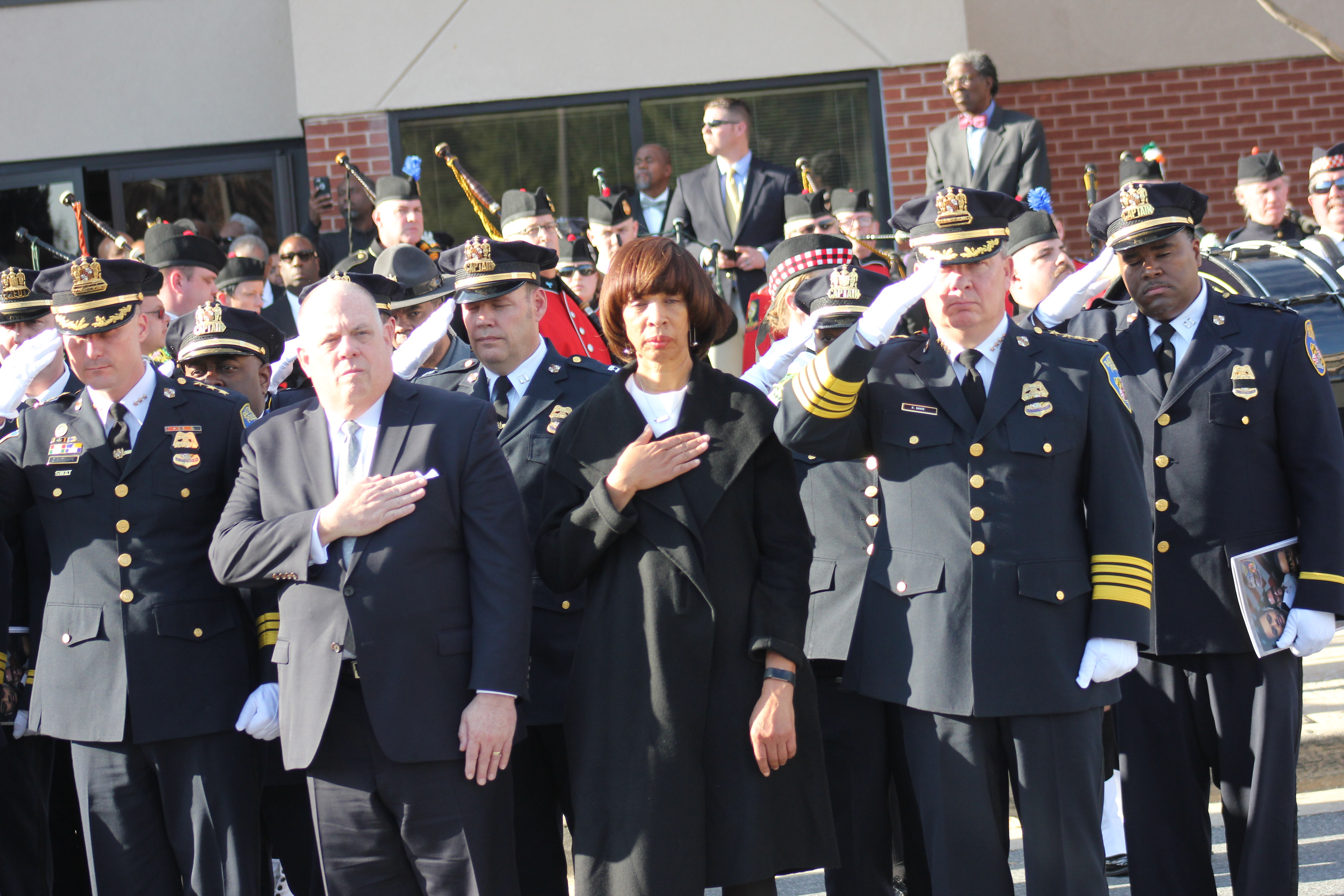
The funeral for Sean Suiter. From left to right, Governor Larry Hogan, Mayor Catherine Pugh, and police commissioner Kevin Davis are in attendance.

Suiter was investigating a triple homicide that occurred a year earlier, when the shooting occurred near 959 Bennett Place, in Baltimore, Maryland. He was shot in the head at close range with his own service weapon, which was recovered under his body. Blood was found on the inside of Suiter's shirt sleeve. Suiter's DNA was found inside the barrel of his own Glock. His death remains unsolved despite a $215,000 reward. Members of an outside review board released a 207-page report and concluded that Suiter was not murdered but took his own life because he was due to testify before a grand jury the next day and staged his death to appear like a murder so his family could receive line of duty benefits in case he lost his job as a result of incriminating details coming to light from the grand jury testimony. The review board argued that Suiter was under duress about potentially being tied to corruption through the Gun Trace Task Force case, and had "every incentive" to make his suicide appear to be a murder. The Baltimore Sun Editorial Board published a detailed article arguing why the theory that Suiter was murdered was implausible. They concluded by stating: "We have no idea who killed Sean Suiter. Each explanation is as implausible as the next."

City officials, however, have been split about the case. The medical examiner ruled that his death was a homicide. In 2020, Baltimore City made a decision to award $900,000 in workers' compensation benefits to Suiter's widow Nicole Suiter. Nicole Suiter claimed that the fact that she received this workers' compensation payment is an implicit admission by the city that Suiter was indeed murdered and did not commit suicide, as "You do not win workers' compensation cases unless you are injured, hurt or killed on the job."

Kevin Davis, the Baltimore Police Commissioner at the time, believed that Suiter was murdered. He asked the FBI to take over the investigation into Suiter's death. However, the FBI declined, saying it had no evidence to suggest Suiter's death was "directly connected" to the corruption probe or any other federal case.

The controversy around Suiter's death was once again brought to public attention with HBO's release of We Own This City, a portrayal of the Gun Trace Task Force scandal. The show depicted Suiter staging his suicide to appear like a murder. The show also insinuated that Suiter took his own life because he was afraid of being implicated by his own grand jury testimony. This aroused much anger from Suiter's friends and family who did not believe it was a suicide. David Simon published a rebuttal defending the show's depiction of the events.

== Closing of Harlem Park neighborhood ==
After Suiter was found shot, police cordoned off and put the Harlem Park neighborhood on lockdown for six days. The area included 100 houses, a church and two stores. Described as akin to martial law, officers positioned around the area's perimeter stopped residents, asking them for identification and preventing them from entering their own homes without identification. Members of the community later sued the city for the lockdown alleging that the city violated residents' constitutional rights. The Baltimore Police Department paid $96,000 to settle the suit and issued a formal apology.

== Popular culture ==
Suiter has been the focus of several media and popular culture works:

- Fenton, Justin (2021). We Own This City: A True Story of Crime, Cops, and Corruption. London: Faber & Faber Limited. ISBN 978-0-5713-5663-8.
- The Slow Hustle (HBO, 2021) - a documentary from director Sonja Sohn
- We Own This City (HBO, 2022) - a miniseries based on Fenton's book. Suiter was played by Jamie Hector

== See also ==
- List of unsolved deaths
