= Federal Prison Camp, Florence =

American federal prison

Coordinates: 38.3648°N 105.1031°W

Federal Prison Camp, Florence (FPC Florence), also known as Florence ADMAX Satellite Prison Camp, is a minimum-security United States federal prison for male inmates in unincorporated Fremont County, near Florence. It is operated by the Federal Bureau of Prisons, a division of the United States Department of Justice.

FPC Florence is located on the grounds of Federal Correctional Institution, Florence, itself part of the larger Federal Correctional Complex, Florence It is a minimum security facility whose prisoners are classed at the lowest level of risk, and who live in dormitory-like facilities with no walls or fences on the perimeter. The inmates are felons whose offenses did not include the use of weapons. About 60% of the 400+ inmates are drug offenders.

== See also ==
- List of U.S. federal prisons
- Federal Bureau of Prisons
- Incarceration in the United States
