= Federal Correctional Institution, Florence =

Medium-security prison in Colorado, US

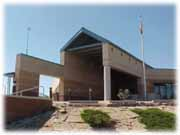
- Interactive map of Federal Correctional Institution, Florence
- Location: Fremont County, near Florence, Colorado; 38.3608°N 105.1024°W
- Status: Operational
- Security class: Medium-security
- Population: 1,200
- Managed by: Federal Bureau of Prisons
- Warden: C. Lepe

The Federal Correctional Institution, Florence (FCI Florence) is a medium-security United States federal prison for male inmates in Colorado. Part of the Florence Federal Correctional Complex (FCC Florence), it is operated by the Federal Bureau of Prisons, a division of the United States Department of Justice.

FCI Florence is located in an unincorporated area in Fremont County, outside the city of Florence, Colorado, 90 miles (140 km) south of Denver, 45 miles (72 km) south of Colorado Springs, and 40 miles (64 km) west of Pueblo.

== Notable incidents ==
in the morning hours of December 29, 2008, correction officers at FCI Florence found inmate Pablo Zúñiga-García, 33, dead in his cell. Zúñiga-García (95492-198), who was serving a 54-month sentence for an illegal-immigration conviction, had suffered numerous blunt-force injuries to his head. A subsequent FBI investigation found that inmates José Augustín Pluma, Juan Martín Ruelas, Mark Rosález, and Justin Hernández, all inmates at FCI Florence and members of the Sureños gang, orchestrated the assault.

Prior to the fatal assault, Hernández, a Sureños leader, ordered several other inmates to physically assault Zúñiga-García. Hernández's lieutenant, Rosález, asked another inmate to act as a lookout during the assault and prevent Zúñiga-García from escaping. During the early hours of December 29, 2008, Pluma and three of the unnamed co-conspirators entered the cell with their makeshift weapons, padlocks attached to belts, and began a 15-minute beating of Zúñiga-García while Ruelas and another unnamed co-conspirator took their places as lookouts. Three other participants pleaded to lesser charges and agreed to testify against the four men.

Pluma, Ruelas, Rosález, and Hernández were convicted of conspiring to assault Zúñiga-García and second-degree murder on June 14, 2011. They are all serving lengthy sentences at high-security facilities:

Justin Hernandez (30123-013) is located in the nearby supermax prison ADX Florence; scheduled for release on November 15, 2058. José Augustín Pluma (34104-013) is in USP Beaumont in Texas; scheduled for release on July 14, 2040. Juan Martin Ruelas (11510-081) is in USP Coleman I in Florida; scheduled for release on May 2, 2029. Mark Rosález (08961-091) is in USP Lee in Virginia; scheduled for release on October 2, 2040.

== Notable inmates (current and former) ==
†Beckley was incarcerated at the adjacent FCI Florence minimum-security prison camp.

Inmate Name	Register Number	Status	Details
Francisco Duran	19588-016	Transferred to USP Lee. Serving a 40-year sentence; scheduled for release on February 3, 2029.	Anarchist; convicted in 1995 of attempting to assassinate US President Bill Clinton by firing 25 to 30 rounds from a rifle at the White House in October 1994.
William King	41870-037	Released from custody on May 26, 2022 after serving a 20-year sentence, (Originally a 454-year sentence)	Former Baltimore Police detective, involved in the worst scandal in the department's history; convicted in 2006 of stealing narcotics and cash from drug dealers with his partner, Antonio Murray, who served the same sentence and was released the next day.
Brent Beckley†	66155-054	Released from custody on October 4, 2013; served a year-long sentence.	Co-founder of Absolute Poker; pleaded guilty in 2012 to engaging in unlawful internet gambling, bank fraud and wire fraud for falsifying transaction records so that they appeared to come from non-gambling online merchants.

== See also ==
- List of U.S. federal prisons
- Federal Bureau of Prisons
- Incarceration in the United States
