= Jamie Hector =

American actor (born 1975)

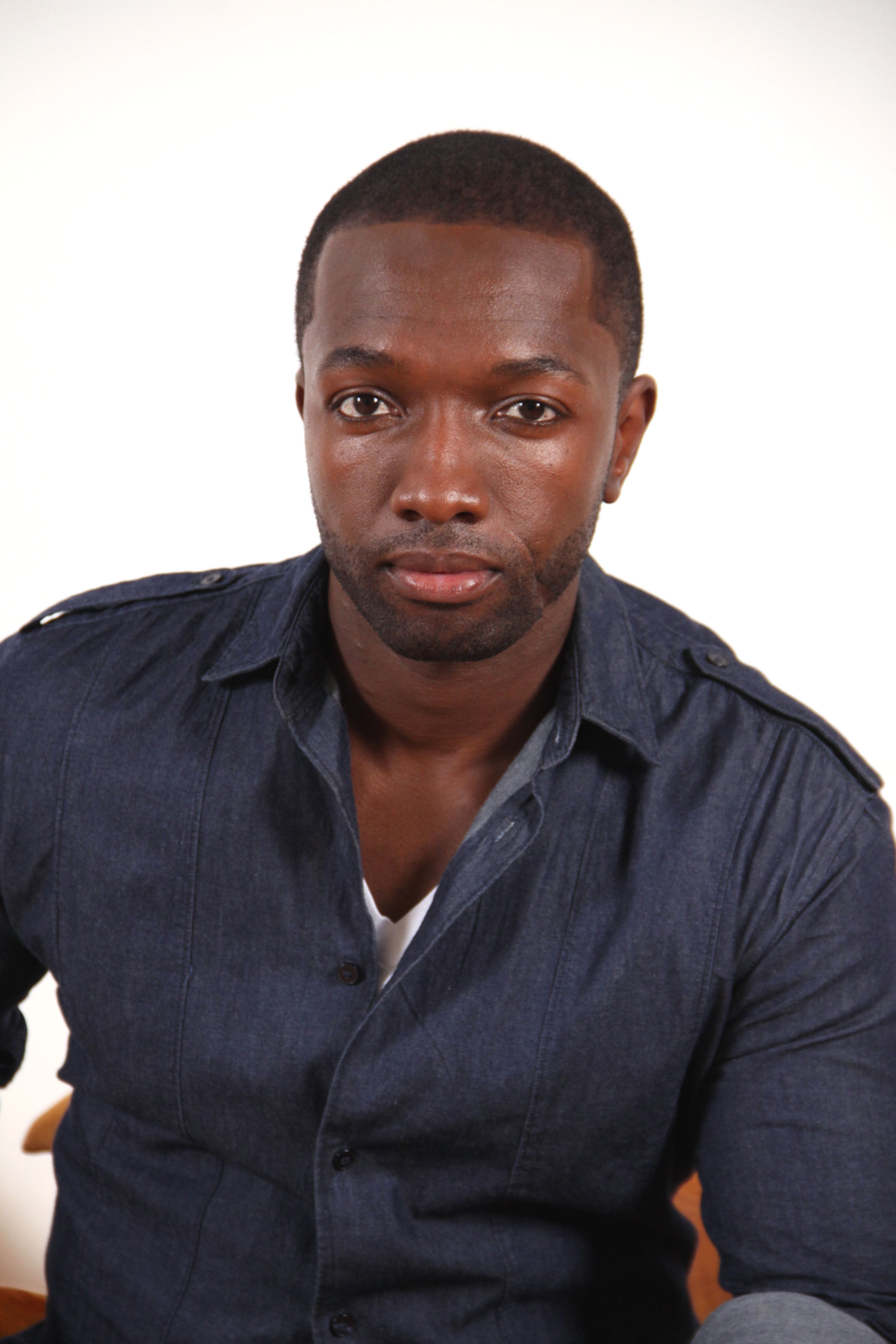
- Self-portrait photograph of Jamie Hector
- Born: October 7, 1975 (age 51); Brooklyn, New York, U.S.
- Occupation: Actor
- Years active: 1997–present

Jamie Hector (born October 7, 1975) is an American actor. He is known for his portrayal of drug kingpin Marlo Stanfield on the HBO drama series The Wire and as Detective Jerry Edgar in the drama series Bosch.

== Career ==
Hector began acting immediately after high school when he auditioned for a community theater company. While in college he had roles on television shows such as New York Undercover, Third Watch, Law & Order, Law & Order: Special Victims Unit, and The Beat. After graduation, he enrolled in the Lee Strasberg Theatre and Film Institute in New York City.

Hector appeared in the movie Paid in Full (2002). He attributes a defining moment in his career to the short film Five Deep Breaths (2003) directed by Seith Mann. With Hector in the lead role, Five Deep Breaths was an Official Selection of the Cannes, Sundance, Tribeca, and IFP Film Festivals; it went on to accumulate 16 awards.

From 2004 to 2008, Hector played Marlo Stanfield on the HBO television drama The Wire, the young, ambitious, intelligent and extremely ruthless head of the eponymous Stanfield Organization in the Baltimore drug trade. In 2016, Rolling Stone ranked him #2 of their "40 Greatest TV Villains of All Time".

Hector starred in the film Blackout (2007) with Melvin Van Peebles and Jeffrey Wright, and was featured as recurring villain Benjamin "Knox" Washington in the third season of Heroes. Hector appeared in the film Max Payne (2008), in which he plays the role of Lincoln DeNeuf, a Haitian crime boss. Hector also appeared in the television movie Just Another Day (2009), playing the up-and-coming rapper Young Eastie, who attempts to make it at all costs. His next film was Night Catches Us (2010), with Kerry Washington and Anthony Mackie. He voiced Emile-A239 (Noble 4) in Halo: Reach.

In 2014, Hector began starring in the series Bosch as Jerry Edgar, a detective and partner to the titular character Harry Bosch, played by Titus Welliver. Hector remained a part of the series' starring cast across its seven-season run.

In 2017, Hector appeared on the US drama Queen of The South as Devon Finch in six episodes of season 2.

In 2022, Hector portrayed Officer Sean Suiter in HBO television's mini-series We Own This City. Developed by David Simon and George Pelecanos, the series is based on the book of the same name. It follows the story of the Baltimore Police Department's Gun Trace Task Force.

== Activism ==
In 2007, Hector founded Moving Mountains, Inc., a non-profit theater-based organization that provides youth with year-round classes in drama, dance, vocal, and film.

He helped in raising money for survivors of the 2010 Haiti earthquake.

== Filmography ==
=== Film ===
Year	Title	Role	Notes
1998	He Got Game	'I Love You' Leech	
1999	Ghost Dog	Gangsta In Red	
2000	The Day the Ponies Come Back	Darryl Boyd	
2001	Prison Song	Phone Kid	
2002	Paid in Full	Dunn	
2002	Central Park Jog	Jogger #2	Short film
2003	Five Deep Breaths	Banny	Short film
2004	Brooklyn Bound	Courtland	
2004	Everyday People	Devon	
2004	Joy Road	Dante	
2007	Blackout	Rasheed	
2008	Max Payne	Lincoln DeNeuf	
2009	Just Another Day	Young Eastie	
2010	The Gift	Darnell Powell	
2010	Night Catches Us	'DoRight' Miller	
2012	8090	Felix	Short film
2012	A Feeling from Within	Samuels	
2012	Life, Love, Soul	Mr. Roundtree	
2013	Blood Ties	Detective Nick	
2013	Habeas Corpus	Gary	Short film
2013	The Promise Keeper	Yves	
2014	Taking Chance	Unknown	Executive producer Short film
2014	The Start Up	Ken Blackstone	
2014	Secrets of the Magic City	'Tru'	
2014	Real New York City Muggings	Unknown	Short film
2015	A Year and Change	Todd	
2017	All Eyez on Me	Mutulu Shakur	
2018	Doubting Thomas	Ron	
2018	Canal Street	Pastor Sam Billings	
2022	The Listener	Ray (voice)	
2023	Vacation Friends 2	Warren	

=== Television ===
Year	Title	Role	Notes
2000	Law & Order	Jean Marchier	Episode: "Burn Baby Burn" (#11.6)
2000	The Beat	Rasta	Episode: "They Say It's Your Birthday" (#1.2)
2001	Third Watch	Legros	Episode: "...And Zeus Wept" (#2.22)
2002	Law & Order: Special Victims Unit	'Doc'	Episode: "Justice" (#3.19)
2004–2008	The Wire	Marlo Stanfield	32 episodes (seasons 3-5)
2008	Heroes	Benjamin 'Knox' Washington	10 episodes
2008	The Game	Carnell	Episode: "Before the Parade Passes By" (#2.17)
2008	Jericho	Corporal Adams	Episode: "Patriots and Tyrants" (#2.7)
2009	Cold Case	Ronde Brooks '70	Episode: "Soul" (#7.4)
2010	Lie to Me	Henry Miller	Episode: "In the Red" (#3.1)
2010	Frederick Douglass: Pathway from Slavery to Freedom	Frederick Douglass	TV movie
2010	Mercy	The Robber	2 episodes
2011	CSI: Miami	Jean Guiton	Episode: "Hunting Ground" (#9.16)
2012	TRON: Uprising	Moog (voice)	Episode: "Tagged" (#1.14)
2012	Common Law	Bart, Security Guard	Episode: "Hot for Teacher" (#1.11)
2012	Are We There Yet?	Arlo	Episode: "The Thanksgiving Episode" (#3.43)
2014–2015	Power	'Drifty'	5 episodes
2014–2015	Person of Interest	Lincoln 'Link' Cordell	4 episodes
2014–2017	The Strain	Alonso Creem	10 episodes
2014–2021	Bosch	Jerry Edgar	68 episodes
2016	Quarry	Arthur Solomon	2 episodes
2017–2021	Queen of The South	Devon Finch	14 episodes
2018	Unsolved	Duane Keith David's Lawyer	Episode: "Wherever It Leads"
2019	Wu-Tang: An American Saga	Andre D'Andre	4 episodes
2020	Prodigal Son	Oso	Episode: "Like Father..."
2022–2025	Bosch: Legacy	Jerry Edgar	4 episodes
2022	We Own This City	Sean Suiter	Main cast
2025	Washington Black	Nat Turner	Guest
2025	Ballard	Jerry Edgar	Guest
2026	Cape Fear	Ray Rawlins	Recurring role
TBA	Myron Bolitar	Avery Crowder	Recurring role, upcoming series

=== Video games ===
Year	Title	Role
2005	Grand Theft Auto: Liberty City Stories	Pedestrian
2005	The Warriors	Additional Soldier
2010	Halo: Reach	Emile
2016	Dishonored 2	Vice Overseer Liam Byrne
2019	Gears 5	Emile-A239 (DLC)
