= Reinaldo Marcus Green =

American filmmaker (born 1981)

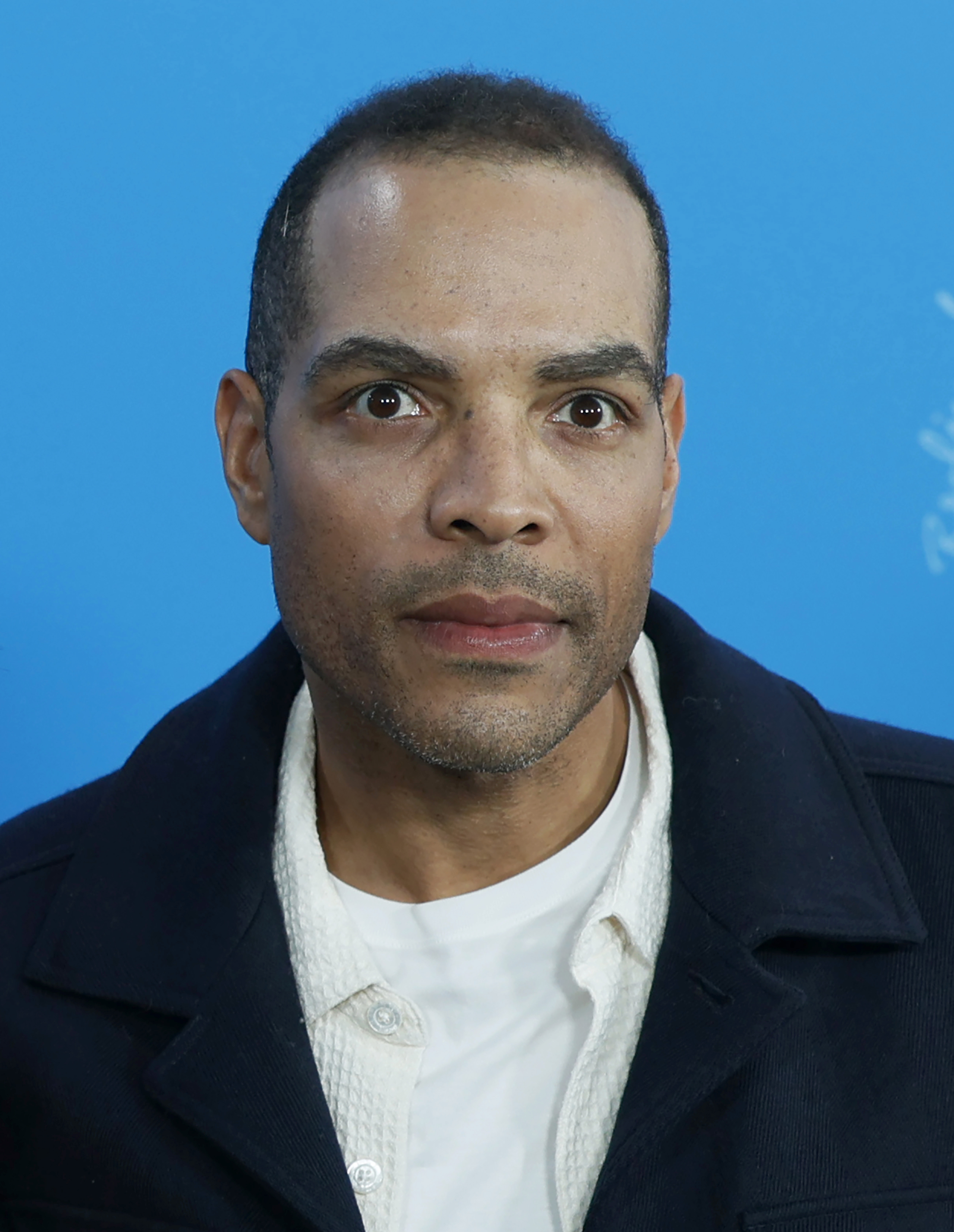
- Green in 2026
- Born: December 16, 1981 (age 44); Bronx, New York, U.S.
- Education: Fairleigh Dickinson University; New York University Tisch School of the Arts
- Occupations: Film director, producer, writer
- Years active: 2014–present

Reinaldo Marcus Green (born December 16, 1981) is an American director, producer and writer. His films include Monsters and Men (2018), Joe Bell (2020), and Bob Marley: One Love (2024). His 2021 film King Richard was nominated for Best Picture at the 94th Academy Awards.

On television, he has served as the director and producer on the miniseries We Own This City (2022) and director, co-writer, and producer on the Disney+ / Marvel Cinematic Universe television special The Punisher: One Last Kill (2026).

== Early life ==
Green was born in the Bronx to an African American father and a Puerto Rican mother and grew up in Staten Island among other areas of New York City. His parents divorced, and he and his brother Rashaad primarily lived with their father. They played baseball growing up and had MLB ambitions.

Green attended Port Richmond High School. He went on to complete a Master of Education at Fairleigh Dickinson University, and taught at an elementary school. He then worked at AIG for five years as a director of educational programming and talent acquisitions, needing the money to pay off his undergraduate loans. However, Green's department was downsized due to the 2008 financial crisis.

Disillusioned by Wall Street and introduced to film by his brother, Green enrolled in NYU Tisch School of the Arts' graduate film program when he was 27 and has since taught at the institution as an adjunct professor.

== Career ==
Green first gained prominence through his early short films both solo and in collaboration with his brother. Among these were Stone Cars, which was shot on location in Cape Town, South Africa and showcased at the 2014 Cinéfondation in Cannes, and Stop, which was inspired by the killing of Trayvon Martin and premiered at the 2015 Sundance Film Festival.

After receiving the Sundance Institute Fellowship in 2017, Green made his feature film debut with the 2018 drama Monsters and Men, which won the Special Jury Award for Outstanding First Feature at the Sundance Film Festival. His next project was Joe Bell (2020), produced by Jake Gyllenhaal and Cary Joji Fukunaga, and starring Mark Wahlberg, Connie Britton, and Maxwell Jenkins. For his first television project, Green directed three episodes of the British crime drama Top Boy for its third series, which premiered in 2019.

In June 2019, it was announced Green would be directing a biopic titled King Richard, about tennis coach and father of American tennis players Venus and Serena Williams, Richard Williams, starring Will Smith in the titular role. The 2021 film has received a number of accolades.

Green directed the HBO miniseries We Own This City (2022), starring Jon Bernthal and based on the nonfiction book of the same name by Justin Fenton. He directed another biopic titled Bob Marley: One Love (2024). The film depicts the life of reggae musician Bob Marley and stars Kingsley Ben-Adir in the titular role. Bob Marley: One Love received mixed reviews but was well received by audiences. He is anticipated to direct an untitled dramedy for Lionsgate.

In February 2025, Green was announced to direct and co-write The Punisher: One Last Kill for Marvel Studios focused on Frank Castle / Punisher, reuniting with Bernthal, who portrays the titular character and also co-wrote the project.

Green was selected as an international Jury Member for the 76th Berlin International Film Festival.

== Filmography ==
=== Short film ===
Year	Title	Director	Writer	Producer
2011	The Interview	Yes	Yes	Yes
2011	One Way Ticket	Yes	Yes	Yes
2012	White	No	No	Yes
2012	Showtime	No	No	Yes
2013	Street Kid	No	No	Yes
2013	Festus	No	No	Yes
2014	Stone Cars	Yes	Yes	Yes
2014	Anonymous	Yes	Yes	Executive
2014	Nnowm deede	No	No	Yes
2014	The Zebra Room	Yes	Yes	Yes
2015	Stop	Yes	Yes	Yes
2015	Le Barrage	No	No	Yes
2015	Semeli	No	No	Yes
2021	In Max We Trust	No	No	Yes

=== Documentary short ===
Year	Title	Notes
2016	Mother Nature: Not Mommy	Also cinematographer

=== Feature film ===
Year	Title	Director	Writer
2018	Monsters and Men	Yes	Yes
2020	Joe Bell	Yes	No
2021	King Richard	Yes	No
2024	Bob Marley: One Love	Yes	Yes

=== Television ===
Year	Title	Director	Executive Producer	Writer	Notes
2016–2017	First Step	Yes	No	No	5 episodes
2019	Top Boy	Yes	Co-Executive	No	3 episodes
2021	Amend: The Fight for America	Yes	No	No	Documentary series; 6 episodes
2022	We Own This City	Yes	Yes	No	Miniseries; 6 episodes
2026	The Punisher: One Last Kill	Yes	Yes	Co-Writer	Disney+ special

=== Acting credits ===
Year	Title	Role	Notes
2009	Choices	Young man	Short film
2011	Gun Hill Road	Prison Guard 2	
2011	The Interview	Ty Bedford	Short film
2011	One Way Ticket	Rei	Short film
2022	We Own This City	Correctional officer #2	Episode: "Part Six"
