= William King and Antonio Murray =

American police officers convicted of corruption and drug trafficking

William A. King
- Born: 1972 (age 53–54); Abingdon, Maryland
- Police career
- Department: Baltimore Police Department
- Service years: 1992 – 2005
- Rank: Detective

Antonio L. Murray
- Born: 1971 (age 54–55); Baltimore, Maryland
- Children: 2
- Police career
- Department: Baltimore Police Department
- Service years: 1992 – 2005
- Rank: Detective

William A. King and Antonio L. Murray are two former Baltimore Police Department officers sentenced to a total of 454 years (reduced to 20) in prison after an FBI investigation in 2005. The conviction of King and Murray resulted from the Baltimore-based Stop Snitchin' campaign in which the two officers were identified on videotape for being involved in drug dealing. Ironically, the case received help from drug dealers, who testified that the two officers were involved in the use of robbery, extortion, and excessive force against various dealers as a means of reselling the drugs for profit on the street. Former police commissioner Leonard Hamm said that "justice was served", and that "People like William King have no place in the Baltimore City Police Department, and never will".

In May 2021 King and Murray's sentences were reduced from 454 years to 20 years after a federal judge ruled under the First Step Act passed in 2018 that King and Murray would have received significantly shorter sentences under the new law. Both men have since been released from prison.

== Early lives ==
King graduated from Mergenthaler Vocational Technical Senior High School in 1988 and Murray from Lake Clifton High School in 1989. King served in the army from 1988 until 1992 and was a combat veteran of Operation Desert Storm.

== Careers ==
Both officers joined the department in 1992, Murray in May and King in November. King worked with high-profile Baltimore City Police Department units throughout his career. On May 23, 1994, Murray was shot in the arm and lost his gun during a struggle with an alleged drug dealer. His gun was used to kill a 26-year-old man eight days later. The injuries he suffered from this incident forced Murray off the job for almost two years. After 2004, both King and Murray worked in the department's housing authority unit. The police department's internal affairs division started investigating the two officers after receiving several tips. Their investigation was aided by the circulation of the controversial "Stop Snitchin'" DVD.
