= Whosarat.com =

Website

- Website type: Crime, law enforcement
- Available in: English
- Owner: "Anthony Capone"
- Creator: Sean Bucci
- Website: whosarat.com
- Commercial: Yes
- Registration: Yes
- Launched: August 2004

Whosarat.com is a website, which, in its words, allows individuals to "post, share and request any and all information that has been made public at some point to at least 1 person of the public prior to posting it on this site pertaining to local, state and federal Informants and Law Enforcement Officers."

The site's extensive disclaimer notes that in part that "All posts made by users should be considered as inaccurate opinions unless backed by official documents." It urges members to "Please post informants that are involved with non-violent crimes only."

The Department of Homeland Security is said to have issued an advisory about the site, warning law enforcement officers not even to view the site. "Visiting the site could result in the compromise of government IP addresses. Searching the site for a particular name could result in that name being cross-indexed to the IP address of the computer used to make the inquiry. Searching for the names of officers or informants could compromise those individual's identities. Any website is capable of collecting IP address and search information from visitors, but this site is remarkable because it makes visitor information public."

The site believes it is protected by legal precedents set in connection with another website, charmichaelcase, which also posts information about informants.

== See also ==
- Stop Snitchin'
