= Wayne Jenkins =

Baltimore police officer

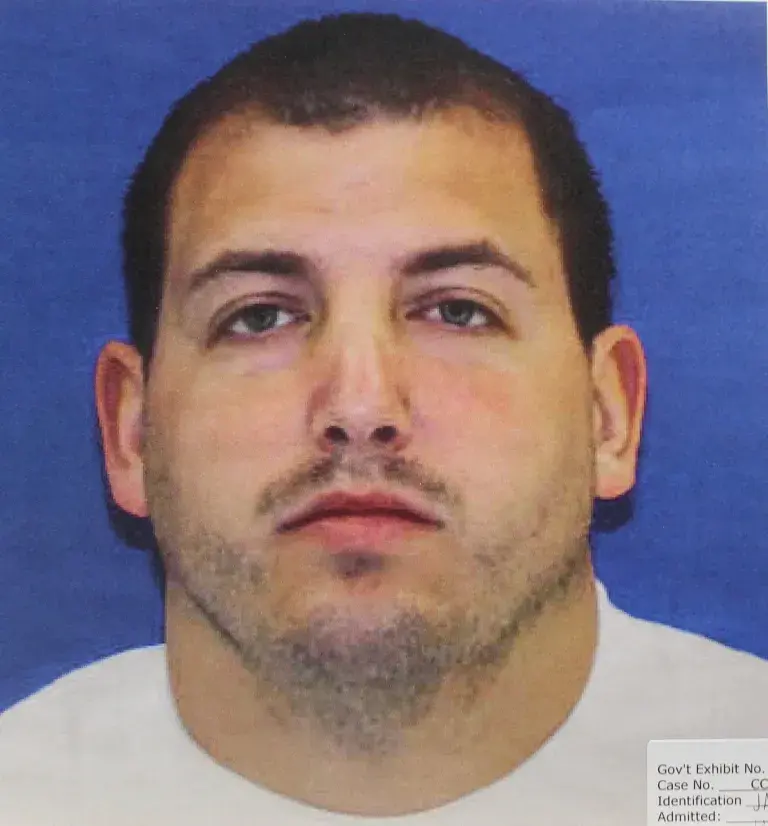
- Mugshot, 2018
- Born: Middle River, Maryland, U.S.
- Education: Eastern Technical High School
- Police career
- Department: Baltimore Police Department
- Service years: 2003–2017
- Rank: Sergeant
- Military career
- Allegiance: United States
- Branch: United States Marine Corps
- Service years: 1998–2001
- Rank: Corporal

Wayne Earl Jenkins Jr. (born 1980) is a former Baltimore Police Department (BPD) sergeant who was the ringleader of the Gun Trace Task Force (GTTF), a plainclothes unit that engaged in widespread criminal activities while on duty. Jenkins, along with other members of the GTTF, was convicted on federal charges including racketeering, robbery, and overtime fraud in one of the most notorious police corruption scandals in Baltimore's history. He is currently serving a 25-year maximum sentence in the Kentucky based federal penitentiary, FMC Lexington, with a scheduled release in 2037.

== Early life and education ==
Wayne Earl Jenkins Jr. was born and raised in Middle River, Maryland. He graduated from Eastern Technical High School and later served three years in the United States Marine Corps, where he was noted for his discipline and leadership. Jenkins joined the Baltimore Police Department in 2003 at the age of 23, quickly gaining a reputation as an aggressive and effective officer.

== Rise in the Baltimore Police Department ==
Jenkins' rise in the BPD was marked by his involvement in various plainclothes units that operated with considerable autonomy. Known for his relentless approach to policing, Jenkins was praised for his ability to recover guns and drugs, leading to numerous accolades and rapid promotions. By 2016, Jenkins had become the head of the GTTF, an elite unit tasked with removing illegal firearms from the streets of Baltimore.

== Criminal activities ==
Despite his outward success, Jenkins led a double life, using his position to commit numerous crimes. Under his leadership, the GTTF engaged in activities such as robbing drug dealers, planting evidence, conducting illegal searches, and falsifying police reports. The unit also engaged in overtime fraud, significantly inflating their earnings.

One of Jenkins' most notorious practices was the use of illegal GPS tracking units to monitor and target drug dealers, whom he referred to as "monsters". Jenkins would rob these dealers of cash and drugs, sometimes selling the stolen narcotics through a bail bondsman with whom he conspired. This partnership involved regular drop-offs of drugs at the bondsman's waterfront home, contributing significantly to their illicit profits.

In one detailed instance, after detaining a suspect near Pimlico Race Course, Jenkins contacted his bail bondsman, indicating he had apprehended a "monster" — a term Jenkins used to describe high-value targets in the drug trade. Jenkins' modus operandi included toting around a duffel bag with a burglar's toolkit to facilitate breaking into homes or stash houses of these high-value targets, an approach that allowed him to steal large sums of money and drugs which were then sold on the streets.

== Arrest and conviction ==
The GTTF's criminal activities were eventually uncovered through a federal investigation that began with wiretaps on a member of the unit. In March 2017, Jenkins and six other members of the GTTF were indicted on federal charges. The investigation revealed that Jenkins had been involved in numerous criminal acts dating back to at least 2011. Jenkins was arrested and later pleaded guilty to a range of charges, including racketeering and civil rights violations.

In June 2018, Jenkins was sentenced to 25 years in federal prison. His case highlighted significant flaws within the BPD, including a culture of permissiveness in plainclothes units that allowed such corruption to flourish. The depth of Jenkins' criminal activities, including his role in targeting and robbing high-level drug dealers under the guise of law enforcement, underscored the systemic issues within the department. Jenkins is Federal Bureau of Prisons prisoner #62928-037. He is serving his sentence at the FMC Lexington, a low-security federal prison in Kentucky.

== Legacy and impact ==
The exposure of the GTTF's crimes profoundly impacted the Baltimore Police Department and the city's criminal justice system. Thousands of cases involving the officers were called into question, leading to the dismissal of numerous convictions. The scandal also prompted widespread calls for reform within the BPD, including increased oversight of plainclothes units and the creation of a Corruption Investigation Unit.

The public and judicial fallout from the scandal, including the dramatic changes within the BPD and the judicial system, reflects the severe consequences of corruption that went unchecked for years. The comprehensive reform efforts undertaken by the city to restore trust in the police are part of the long-lasting impact of Jenkins' actions.

== In popular culture ==
Jenkins and the GTTF's story have been the subject of significant media coverage and dramatization. The HBO miniseries We Own This City, based on the book by The Baltimore Sun reporter Justin Fenton, focuses on the corruption within the GTTF, with a fictionalized portrayal of Jenkins, played by actor Jon Bernthal as the central figure.
