= We Own This City =

2022 American television miniseries

- Genre: Crime drama
- Based on: We Own This City by Justin Fenton
- Developed by: George Pelecanos; David Simon
- Directed by: Reinaldo Marcus Green
- Starring: Jon Bernthal; Wunmi Mosaku; Jamie Hector; Josh Charles; McKinley Belcher III; Darrell Britt-Gibson; Rob Brown; David Corenswet; Dagmara Domińczyk; Don Harvey; Larry Mitchell
- Composer: Kris Bowers
- Country of origin: United States
- Original language: English
- No. of episodes: 6

Production
- Executive producers: David Simon; George Pelecanos; Reinaldo Marcus Green; Nina Kostroff Noble; Ed Burns; Kary Antholis
- Production locations: Baltimore, Maryland
- Camera setup: Single-camera
- Running time: 58–64 minutes
- Production companies: Spartan Productions; Blown Deadline Productions; HBO Entertainment

Original release
- Network: HBO
- Release: April 25 – May 30, 2022

We Own This City is an American crime drama television miniseries based on the nonfiction book of the same name by Baltimore Sun reporter Justin Fenton. The miniseries was developed by George Pelecanos and David Simon and directed by Reinaldo Marcus Green. The six-episode series premiered on HBO on April 25, 2022.

== Premise ==
The miniseries details the rise and fall of the Baltimore Police Department's Gun Trace Task Force, and the corruption surrounding it. The story centers on Sergeant Wayne Jenkins, one of eight officers who were convicted on various corruption charges in 2018 and 2019. Its nonlinear narrative frequently includes flashbacks.

== Cast ==
=== Baltimore Police Department ===
- Jamie Hector as Sean Suiter, a BPD homicide detective caught up in the GTTF case
- Delaney Williams as Kevin Davis, the BPD police commissioner
- Don Harvey as John Sieracki, a BPD officer assigned to the public corruption task force who aided the FBI
- Larry Mitchell as Scott Kilpatrick, a veteran investigator with the Baltimore County Police Narcotics Unit
- Jermaine Crawford as Jaquan Dixon, a young BPD patrolman
- Chris Clanton as Brian Hairston, a BPD officer
- Christopher R. Anderson as Dean Palmere, Deputy Commissioner of the Baltimore Police Department
- Joey Palestina as Michael Fries, a BPD detective and early partner of Jenkins
- David Hammond as Ed Barber, a BPD patrol officer who acted as an early mentor and corrupting influence on Jenkins

==== Gun Trace Task Force (GTTF) ====
- Jon Bernthal as Sgt. Wayne Jenkins, the central figure in the Baltimore Police Department's (BPD) Gun Trace Task Force (GTTF) (Note: One of eight officers convicted in the GTTF case)
- Josh Charles as Daniel Hersl, a BPD officer involved in the GTTF
- McKinley Belcher III as Momodu "G Money" Gondo, a BPD veteran and member of the GTTF
- Darrell Britt-Gibson as Jemell Rayam, a BPD officer involved in the GTTF
- Rob Brown as Maurice Ward, a plainclothes officer involved in the GTTF
- Ham Mukasa as Evodio Hendrix, a BPD officer involved in the GTTF
- Bobby J. Brown as Sgt. Thomas Allers, a BPD officer involved in the GTTF and Jenkins' predecessor
- Robert Harley as Marcus Taylor, a BPD officer involved in the GTTF

=== Federal law enforcement ===
- Wunmi Mosaku as Nicole Steele, an attorney assigned to the Civil Rights Division of the Department of Justice
- Dagmara Domińczyk as Erika Jensen, an FBI agent who investigated the GTTF
- Ian Duff as Ahmed Jackson, a former Department of Justice trial attorney who is now working for the Office of Civil Rights
- Lucas Van Engen as Leo Wise, the lead federal prosecutor assigned to the GTTF case
- Gabrielle Carteris as Andrea Smith, the head of the Organized Crime Drug Enforcement Task Force

=== Maryland law enforcement ===
- David Corenswet as David McDougall, a veteran investigator with the Harford County Narcotics Task Force
- Treat Williams as Brian Grabler, a retired Baltimore detective now teaching at the police academy
- Tray Chaney as Gordon Hawk, a recent addition to the Harford County Narcotics Task Force
- Domenick Lombardozzi as Stephen Brady, the president of the Baltimore City Fraternal Order of Police

=== Civilians ===
- Thaddeus Street as James Otis, a Baltimore resident and HVAC repairman
- Nathan E. Corbett as Tariq Touré, a West Baltimore author and community activist
- Paige Carter as Stephanie Rawlings-Blake, the Mayor of Baltimore
- Seth Hurwitz as Donald Stepp, a corrupt bail bondsman who helps fence stolen narcotics for Jenkins
- Shalèt Monique as Te'ana, "Black" Anderson's girlfriend

== Episodes ==
No.	Title	Directed by	Teleplay by	Original release date	U.S. viewers (millions)
1	"Part One"	Reinaldo Marcus Green	George Pelecanos & David Simon	April 25, 2022	0.188
In 2015, Officers David McDougall and Gordon Hawk of the Harford County Narcotics Task Force trace a series of heroin overdoses to Baltimore street dealer Aaron Anderson and his supplier Antonio Shropshire. Corrupt officers Momodu Gondo and Jemell Rayam of the Baltimore Police Department's Gun Trace Task Force (GTTF) forcefully clean out Anderson's apartment prior to MacDougall and Hawk's own raid on the residence; Hawk discovers the other team's GPS tracker underneath Anderson's vehicle. Office of Civil Rights attorney Nicole Steele arrives in Baltimore to help issue a consent decree on the BPD, whose performance is dwindling in the wake of the protests following the killing of Freddie Gray. She sees the extent of the department's corruption exemplified in Officer Daniel Hersl, who remains on the force due to only one of the 46 complaints against him being sustained. In 2017, FBI agent Erika Jensen and BPD officer John Sieracki interview Gondo as part of an anti-corruption probe, while Sergeant Wayne Jenkins, the GTTF's ringleader, is arrested by Internal Affairs.
2	"Part Two"	Reinaldo Marcus Green	Ed Burns & William F. Zorzi	May 2, 2022	0.167
In 2003, on his first day of field training, Jenkins is taught to aggressively clear individuals off the streets – including making false arrests – in order to reduce the murder rate and thereby help local officials win re-election. In 2015, McDougall and Officer Scott Kilpatrick uncover Gondo's personal connection to Shropshire via a series of phone calls between the two. In 2016, homicide detective Sean Suiter, Jenkins' former colleague striving to perform honest police work, investigates the murder of a working-class family man. Steele meets a young cop who was demoted for speaking out against the BPD's corruption; he explains that the city's prioritization of mass arrests has made it nearly impossible to find unbiased juries without links to law enforcement. Steele later meets Hersl, who denies having committed any wrongdoing. In 2017, Rayam brazenly recounts stealing cash seized during GTTF raids to Jensen and Sieracki.
3	"Part Three"	Reinaldo Marcus Green	D. Watkins	May 9, 2022	0.185
From 2004 to 2006, Jenkins becomes increasingly brutal in his police work, viciously beating one suspect and later ransacking a car wash in a fit of rage during a raid. Suiter, who joined Jenkins on the latter raid, uncovers weapons and cash at the scene; Jenkins later offers $50,000 of stolen cash to an ambivalent Suiter. In the face of mounting complaints against him, Hersl is transferred to the GTTF, where he will be placed under less scrutiny. In 2016, BPD Commissioner Davis admits to Steele his distaste for Hersl but cites pushback from the police union as a major obstacle to reform. Suiter identifies and arrests the perpetrator in his homicide investigation, with the help of another honest officer, Jaquan Dixon. Jensen and Sieracki begin assembling their case against the GTTF after seeing officers steal from suspects in broad daylight. In 2017, Jensen and Sieracki interview GTTF supervisor Tom Allers, who is shaken upon learning that Davon Robinson, a man from whom Allers stole $10,000 during a raid, was murdered by his suppliers to whom he owed the money.
4	"Part Four"	Reinaldo Marcus Green	William F. Zorzi & Ed Burns	May 16, 2022	0.159
In 2010, Jenkins unlawfully initiates a high-speed chase with a suspect that ends in a car crash that kills an innocent driver. To justify the chase and avoid being penalized, he plants drugs in the suspect's vehicle and has Suiter "discover" them. From 2015 onward, Jenkins continues to plant evidence and steal money from numerous drug busts, robs a stripper while off duty and re-sells oxycontin stolen by looters. Jenkins distributes stolen money among his unit but keeps the majority to himself. Amid the Freddie Gray protests, he explains to his unit that high arrest counts will yield greater overtime payments, allowing them to make large fortunes while acting with impunity. In 2016, Suiter observes prosecutors struggling to find jurors willing to trust police testimony in the wake of the Gray protests. In 2017, GTTF officer Maurice Ward recounts Jenkins' various thefts to Jensen and Sieracki.
5	"Part Five"	Reinaldo Marcus Green	George Pelecanos	May 23, 2022	0.208
In 2016, Steele interviews a man whom Hersl robbed and falsely charged with assaulting a police officer, costing the victim his job. She later meets with Brian Grabler, a police academy instructor and retired detective who ascribes much of the present-day corruption to the war on drugs. Steele and Davis receive pushback on the consent decree from Baltimore mayor Catherine Pugh, who refuses to cut funding from social programs to finance the initiative and instead forces Davis to rely on budget cuts to his already dwindling department. In 2017, Gondo and Rayam implicate each other regarding their participation in the GTTF's corruption under Jenkins. Suiter is visibly shaken watching the news of the FBI's arrest of seven GTTF officers, recalling his own complicity in Jenkins' crimes.
6	"Part Six"	Reinaldo Marcus Green	David Simon	May 30, 2022	0.198
In 2017, Steele quits her job, having grown disillusioned upon realizing the futility of police reform efforts under the Trump Administration. Jenkins protests his innocence to Jensen and Sieracki, despite nearly all of his subordinates on the GTTF attesting to his crimes. Suiter learns he must testify before a grand jury regarding his time in the GTTF and realizes that he will either go to jail or lose his job in disgrace. While investigating a crime scene, Suiter dies from a gunshot wound; the police rule his death a homicide, though an independent investigation concludes he likely killed himself. Jenkins ultimately accepts a plea deal, with Suiter's death allowing him to evade blame for planting drugs on the scene of the 2010 car crash. He is sentenced to 25 years in federal prison. A postscript notes that crime in Baltimore has skyrocketed since the death of Freddie Gray and the unsuccessful prosecution of the officers involved.

== Production ==
In March 2021, HBO ordered a six-episode series based on the book We Own This City: A True Story of Crime, Cops and Corruption by Baltimore Sun investigative journalist Justin Fenton, to be written by David Simon and George Pelecanos.

=== Filming ===
In May 2021, it was confirmed that Reinaldo Marcus Green would direct the series. Production was reported to begin in July 2021 with filming occurring in Baltimore. Production was temporarily halted for a week in September 2021 due to a "COVID-19 event".

=== Casting ===
In May 2021, Jon Bernthal, Josh Charles and Jamie Hector were announced to have been cast in leading roles. Darrell Britt-Gibson, Rob Brown, McKinley Belcher III, Larry Mitchell and Wunmi Mosaku were cast in June. In August, several castings were announced, including Dagmara Domińczyk, Don Harvey, Delaney Williams, David Corenswet, Ian Duff, Lucas Van Engen, Gabrielle Carteris, Treat Williams and Domenick Lombardozzi. In September, several recurring and guest roles were announced, including Thaddeus Street, Tray Chaney, Chris Clanton, Jermaine Crawford and Nathan E. Corbett.

Due to his commitment to the show, Harvey was unable to star in the final season of Better Call Saul, where he appeared in seasons 4 and 5.

== Reception ==
=== Critical response ===
The review aggregator website Rotten Tomatoes reported a 93% approval rating with an average rating of 8.3/10, based on 56 critic reviews. The website's critics consensus reads, "A spiritual successor to The Wire with an even more pessimistic outlook on law enforcement, We Own This City deftly explores compromised individuals to paint an overall picture of systemic corruption." Metacritic, which uses a weighted average, assigned a score of 83 out of 100 based on 27 critics, indicating "universal acclaim".

Andy Greenwald of The Ringer said Jon Bernthal gave "one of the great TV performances of this century".
