= Federal Correctional Complex, Florence =

United States federal prison in Colorado

- Interactive map of Federal Correctional Complex, Florence
- Location: Fremont County, near Florence, Colorado; 38.36°N 105.1°W
- Status: Operational
- Security class: Supermax, high, medium and minimum-security
- Population: ≈2,900
- Opened: 1994
- Managed by: Federal Bureau of Prisons

The Federal Correctional Complex, Florence (FCC Florence) is a United States federal prison complex for male inmates in Colorado. It is operated by the Federal Bureau of Prisons, a division of the United States Department of Justice, and consists of four facilities:

- Federal Prison Camp, Florence (FPC Florence): a minimum-security facility.
- Federal Correctional Institution, Florence (FCI Florence): a medium-security facility.
- United States Penitentiary, Florence High (USP Florence High): a high-security facility.
- United States Penitentiary, Florence Administrative Maximum Facility (USP Florence ADMAX): a supermax facility which holds the most "dangerous" inmates in the federal prison system.

FCC Florence is located in unincorporated Fremont County, Colorado, approximately 100 miles south of Denver, Colorado.

== See also ==
- List of U.S. federal prisons
- Federal Bureau of Prisons
- Incarceration in the United States
