= Blackout (2007 film) =

- Directed by: Jerry Lamothe
- Written by: Jerry Lamothe
- Produced by: Judith Aidoo; Nora Aidoo
- Starring: Zoe Saldaña; LaTanya Richardson Jackson; Sean Blakemore; Jamie Hector; Saul Rubinek; Melvin Van Peebles; Jeffrey Wright
- Cinematography: Ben Wolf
- Edited by: Tina Pacheco
- Music by: George J. Fontenette
- Release dates: September 29, 2007 (Zurich Film Festival); February 5, 2008 (United States)
- Running time: 95 minutes
- Country: United States
- Language: English

Blackout is a 2007 American film about the Northeast Blackout of 2003 in New York City. The film is written and directed by Jerry Lamothe, and it stars Jeffrey Wright, Zoe Saldaña, Prodigy, Michael B. Jordan, and LaTanya Richardson. The film premiered at the 2007 Zurich Film Festival. It debuted on BET on February 1, 2008. It was released to DVD on February 4, 2008. The film was also screened at the Tribeca Film Festival.

== Plot ==
Blackout is about the events that take place for two days in the summer, when a forgotten Brooklyn neighborhood experiences blackout during the blackout of 2003. It is based on true incidents.

== Cast ==
- Jeffrey Wright as Nelson
- Zoe Saldaña as Claudine (as Zoe Saldana)
- Melvin Van Peebles as George
- Michael B. Jordan as C.J.
- LaTanya Richardson Jackson as Mrs. Thompson
- Saul Rubinek as Sol
- Sean Blakemore as James
- Susan Kelechi Watson as Fatima
- Jamie Hector as Rasheed
- Turron Kofi Alleyne as Khalil
- Kisha Batista as Cam
- Robert Brickle-Tate as Tyrone
- Anthony Chisholm as "Toothless Tone"
- Lloyd DeLeon as Uniform Cop
- Jamie Hector as Rasheed
- Nehal Joshi as Ali
- Jerry Lamothe as Rick
- Barbara Montgomery as Mrs. Germaine
- Khalida Outlaw as Dedra
- Sara Pickett as Keisha
- Prodigy as "Sin"
- Omar Scroggins as L'
- Johnny Solo as Anthony
- Tobias Truvillion as Reggie
- Ali A. Wahhab as "Wisdom"
- Vernon "Dyverse" Wooten as "Tech"
- Yury Yakor as Russian Electronics Store Owner
- Marjorie Jean as Marketing Presenter
