= Omertà =

Southern Italian code of honor and silence

Omertà (Italian pronunciation: [omerˈta]) (Note: The grave accent in Italian, Sicilian and Corsican indicates that the final ⟨a⟩ is stressed. In English, it is often spelled omerta, without an accent, and pronounced with misplaced stress as /oʊˈmɛərtə/ rather than [omerˈta].) is a Southern Italian code of silence and code of honor and conduct that places importance on silence in the face of questioning by authorities or outsiders; non-cooperation with authorities, the government, or outsiders, especially during criminal investigations; and willfully ignoring and generally avoiding interference with the illegal activities of others (i.e., not contacting law enforcement or the authorities when one is aware of, witness to, or even the victim of certain crimes).

It originated and remains common in Southern Italy, where banditry or brigandage and Mafia-type criminal organizations (like the Camorra, Cosa Nostra, 'Ndrangheta, Sacra Corona Unita and Società foggiana) have long been strong. Similar codes are also deeply rooted in other areas of the Mediterranean, including Malta, Crete in Greece, and Corsica, all of which share a common or similar historical culture with southern Italy.

Ostracism, shunning, intimidation, societal pressure or peer pressure, and strong cultural norms are often used to reinforce omertà and encourage silence and non-cooperation with authorities; however, violence and retaliation against informers or those who break the code of omertà are also common in criminal circles, in which informers or traitors to the code of omertà are often described in English by terms such as 'rats' or 'snitches' and in Italian as infami or pentiti, depending on the context.

== Etymology ==
According to the Oxford English Dictionary, the phonology of the word omertà indicates that it is not of Sicilian origin; it may derive from the now rare Spanish word hombredad, meaning 'manliness', after the Sicilian word omu ('man'). It has also been suggested that the word comes from Latin humilitas ('humility'), which became umiltà and then, finally, omertà in some southern Italian dialects; this suggestion is not well supported by the geographical distribution of the word. The first Antimafia Commission of the Italian parliament in the 1970s accepted the origin based on omu on the authority of Antonio Cutrera, with no reference to Spanish.

== Code ==
The basic principle of omertà is that one must not seek aid from legally constituted authorities to settle personal grievances. The suspicion of being a cascittuni ('informant') constitutes the blackest mark against manhood, according to Cutrera. Those who have been wronged are obligated to look out for their own interests by either avenging the wrong themselves or finding a patron—not the state—to avenge them.

Omertà implies "the categorical prohibition of cooperation with state authorities or reliance on its services, even when one has been victim of a crime." A person should absolutely avoid interfering in the business of others and should not inform the authorities of a crime under any circumstances, but if it is justified, the person may personally avenge a physical attack on himself or on his family by vendetta—literally, a taking of revenge, a feud. Even if somebody is convicted of a crime that he has not committed, he is supposed to serve the sentence rather than give the police information about the real criminal, even if the criminal has nothing to do with the Mafia. Within Mafia culture, breaking omertà is punishable by death.

Omertà is an extreme form of loyalty and solidarity in the face of authority.

It has also been described as follows: "Whoever appeals to the law against his fellow man is either a fool or a coward. Whoever cannot take care of himself without police protection is both. It is as cowardly to betray an offender to justice, even though his offences be against yourself, as it is not to avenge an injury by violence. It is dastardly and contemptible in a wounded man to betray the name of his assailant, because if he recovers, he must naturally expect to take vengeance himself."

== History ==
Omertà is a code of silence, according to one of the first Mafia researchers Antonio Cutrera, a former officer of public security. It seals lips of men even in their own defense and even when the accused is innocent of charged crimes. Cutrera quoted a native saying which was first uttered (as goes the legend) by a wounded man to his assailant: "If I live, I'll kill you. If I die, I forgive you."

Sicilians adopted the code long before the emergence of Cosa Nostra, and it may have been heavily influenced by centuries of state oppression and foreign domination. It has been observed at least as far back as the 16th century as a way of opposing Spanish rule.

Italian-American mafioso Joseph Valachi notably broke omertà in 1963, when he publicly spoke out about the existence of the Mafia and testified before a United States Senate committee. He became the first in the modern history of the Italian-American Mafia to break his blood oath.

Mafiosi who break the code of silence and cooperate with the authorities are known in Italian as pentiti. In the 1930s, during the second campaign of the Italian Fascist government against the Sicilian Mafia, the police authorities in Sicily established an extensive network of paid informants within the Mafia. Among the most famous Mafia pentiti is Tommaso Buscetta, the first important witness in Italy, who both helped prosecutor Giovanni Falcone understand the inner workings of Cosa Nostra and described the Sicilian Mafia Commission or Cupola, the leadership of the Sicilian Mafia. A predecessor, Leonardo Vitale, who gave himself up to the police in 1973, was judged mentally ill, and so his testimony led to the conviction of only himself and his uncle.

== In popular culture ==
Mario Puzo wrote novels based on the principles of omertà and the Cosa Nostra. His best-known such works are the trilogy The Godfather (1969), The Sicilian (1984), and Omertà (2000).

== See also ==
- Blue wall of silence – Informal rule that American police do not report misconduct by other officers
- Code of silence
- Lupara bianca
- Mesirah
- Stop Snitchin'
