= Code of silence =

Intentional withholding of information

A code of silence is a condition in effect when a person opts to withhold what is believed to be vital or important information voluntarily or involuntarily.

The code of silence is usually followed because of threat of force or danger to oneself, or being branded as a traitor or an outcast within the unit or organization, as the experience of police whistleblower Frank Serpico illustrates. Police are known to have a well-developed blue wall of silence.

A more well-known example of the code of silence is the omertà, the Sicilian Mafia code of silence.

== See also ==
- Fifth Amendment to the United States Constitution
- Stop Snitchin'
- Spotlight, a 2015 film that explores a communal code of silence that reigned during the Boston sex abuse scandal
- Prisoner's dilemma (Logic for using a code of silence)
