= Stop Snitchin' =

Witness intimidation campaign in the U.S.

In the United States, Stop Snitchin' or Snitches Get Stitches is a call for informants not to cooperate with law enforcement.

== Origin ==
T-shirts bearing the phrase "Stop Snitching" first appeared on the streets of Philadelphia in 2002.

=== National prominence ===
The Stop Snitchin' campaign first gained national attention in late 2004 in Baltimore, Maryland, when a DVD released by Rodney Thomas titled "Stop Snitching!" began to circulate. However, the slogan "Stop Snitchin'" and many other variations have existed in the United States long before the campaign became popular.

In some footage, a number of men claiming to be drug dealers address the camera, and threaten violence against anyone who reports what they know about their crimes to the authorities. This threat is directed especially towards those who inform on others to get a lighter sentence for their own crimes. NBA star Carmelo Anthony briefly appeared in the video. In subsequent interviews, Anthony claimed that his appearance in the video was a joke, the product of his neighborhood friends making a home movie. Anthony claims that the film's message should not be taken seriously.

As the DVD spread across the country, corresponding shirts became popular in African-American culture. The shirts typically show a stop sign emblazoned with the words "Stop Snitchin'". Some shirts bear bullet holes, implying that snitches should (or will) be shot and sent to the hospital, thus referencing its associated catchphrase "snitches get stitches". The shirts have been more widely circulated than the original DVD.

The Diplomats, a Harlem-based rap group, made their own version of the Stop Snitchin' shirts, with their logo on the end of the short sleeves. Another such shirt says "I'll never Tell". A new breed of shirts appeared for sale in flea markets and bazaars in south Dallas, Texas, in mid-2010. The new shirts extolled the benefits of "keeping yo' mouth shut" in regards to a trial involving one "Fifi/Lisa" and one "Baldy/Red". Further details of the trial, including a list of various charges set forth on the couple, are listed on the back of the shirt.

The video's creator, Rodney Thomas, a.k.a. "Skinny Suge", pleaded guilty to first-degree assault on January 17, 2006, in Baltimore and was sentenced to 15 years in prison, with all but three years suspended.

National examples of violence due to "snitching" include Angela Dawson of Baltimore, who was killed along with her five children and husband on October 16, 2002, when their house was firebombed after she alerted police to illegal activities in her neighborhood. Another example is Michael Brewer of Deerfield Beach, Florida, a 15-year-old who, in October 2009, was doused in rubbing alcohol and set on fire after assailants yelled, "He's a snitch, he's a snitch."

== Public reaction ==
In response to the video, the Baltimore Police Department created their own campaign, "Keep Talkin'", which used free DVDs and T-shirts in a method similar to that of the Stop Snitchin' campaign. Its goal was to assure potential state witnesses of their safety from retaliation and stress the importance of imprisoning lawbreakers.

In Pittsburgh, Pennsylvania, Rayco Saunders was to be a witness against three men charged with plotting to kill him. But he showed up in court wearing a shirt that said "Stop Snitching" and refused to cooperate with prosecutors. Charges against the men were dismissed.

Left-wing activist rapper Immortal Technique gave an interview to XXL on April 4, 2006 in which he contended that Blacks and Latinos should not snitch until police officers begin informing on each other for brutality and agents of the American government take responsibility for their actions.

Rapper Cam'ron was featured on the April 22, 2007, edition of the television news program 60 Minutes, and was interviewed by Anderson Cooper about the "Stop Snitching" campaign. When asked if he would tell the police if a serial killer was living next to him, he replied: "I would probably move," but he would not inform the police. Cam'ron was a victim of a shooting that revealed no leads or clues because he refused to give police information about the suspect, claiming it would hurt his business and violate his "code of ethics". According to NYPD records, Cam'ron has cooperated with police in the past.

The entire Stop Snitchin' campaign has been parodied by a 2007 episode of the television series The Boondocks.

Some rappers, such as Ice Cube ("Stop Snitchin'" on Laugh Now, Cry Later), have made songs promoting the movement. Lil Wayne has a song called "Snitch" from his album, Tha Carter, and The Game has titled one of his mixtape albums/DVD, Stop Snitchin, Stop Lyin. Memphis' Project Pat also has a song called "Tell Tell Tell (Stop Snitchin)" from his album Crook by da Book: The Fed Story. Rapper Obie Trice has a song entitled "snitch" in which he says, "snitch and you will get hit".

=== Boston controversy ===
Boston mayor Thomas Menino announced that he would begin confiscating Stop Snitchin' shirts from local stores. Though Menino rapidly backed away from mandatory confiscation to endorse voluntary removal of the shirts by store owners, his proposals sparked considerable controversy locally and nationally. Though many saw the initiative as ineffective, counterproductive, or misleading, some community members in so called "high-crime" areas such as Dorchester defended the move as important to conquering fear on the streets and assisting in criminal prosecutions.

The shirts gained attention in Boston in 2004 when the mother of an alleged gang member (and a number of other spectators) wore the shirt during her son's trial for the shooting death of 10-year-old Trina Persad. Suffolk Superior Court Judge Margaret R. Hinkle successfully banned the shirts from the courtroom as a witness intimidation tactic.

An Antonio Ansaldi store in Dorchester removed Stop Snitchin' shirts from shelves after Marco Antonio Ennis, who owns the store and manufactures the shirts, met with the mayor, community members, and relatives of recent homicide victims. Other stores, including Bargain T and T in Roxbury agreed to cease selling the shirts.

The Stop Snitchin' debate was revived in 2006 when a Boston judge banned the shirts from all state courthouses, also disallowing camera phones in the interest of witness protection.

== The Snitching Project ==
The Snitching Project, led by Rick Frei of the Community College of Philadelphia, is an ongoing student-driven interdisciplinary research initiative aimed at developing a better understanding of the "snitching" phenomenon and facilitating community discussion through education. The project is sponsored by the Fox Rothschild Center for Law and Society.

Begun as an educational project in 2007, the Snitching Project relies on inner city students, who are on the front lines of the Stop Snitching culture, to collect data regarding attitudes towards snitching, as well as dispositional and situational variables that might influence a person's propensity to cooperate with police.

In January 2010, in response to scathing investigatory series on the Philadelphia court system in The Philadelphia Inquirer, Frei testified before the U.S. Senate Subcommittee on Crime and Drugs about the relationship between the Stop Snitching phenomenon and other forms of witness intimidation. Frei and his students have appeared as panelists on a number of local and national television and radio programs (TruTV), as well as academic conferences. In addition, the students organize and co-sponsor their own conference on the topic, entitled "The Shh! Conference: The Stop Snitching Phenomenon, Witness Intimidation, and Silence About Crime". In its third year, the conference has been attended by nearly 2,000 students and community members in Philadelphia Speakers included Philadelphia Mayor Michael Nutter, nationally syndicated and controversial hip-hop DJ STAR, Pulitzer Prize-nominated mob author George Anastasia, head of security for the Comcast Center Jim Birch, and Philadelphia District Attorney Integrity Officer Curtis Douglas. Recent topics have included the use of cell phones to record crimes, underage sexting, and the use of social media to intimidate witnesses. The current project focuses on the concept of street vs. decent family orientation (as conceptualized in Elijah Anderson's seminal ethnography Code of the Street: Decency, Violence, and the Moral Life of the Inner City) as a predictor of attitudes towards snitching and perceptions of disrespect.

The project also sponsors a student-created and -edited Facebook page, which includes copies of past surveys, results from the data collection effort, an extensive history of snitching, and links to relevant websites and articles on the topic of snitching.

== Government study ==
In 2007, the National Center for Victims of Crime released the study "'Snitches Get Stitches': Youth, Gangs, and Witness Intimidation in Massachusetts" which sought to "[develop] a comprehensive response to the more recent phenomenon of witness intimidation of primarily teen and young adult witnesses by street gangs." With the help of the Boys & Girls Clubs, 641 Massachusetts youth ages 12 to 20 were recruited to participate in interviews about "the prevalence and impact of gangs in the youths’ communities and schools, their experiences with gang-related crime and witness intimidation, their relationships with law enforcement, and their ideas for making it safer for youth to report crime to law enforcement and school officials." The report focused on patterns of witness intimidation and explored possible strategies for prevention and response.

== See also ==
- Crime in Baltimore
- Code of silence
- Omertà
- Witness intimidation
- Mesirah
- Whosarat.com
