= Justin Fenton =

American journalist

- Education: University of Maryland, College Park
- Occupation: Journalist
- Employer: The Baltimore Banner

Justin Fenton is an American author, journalist and crime reporter. He is currently an investigative reporter for the Baltimore Banner.

== Career ==
A 2005 graduate of the University of Maryland, College Park, Fenton worked as a reporter and editor for the student newspaper, The Diamondback. He interned at The Baltimore Sun and went on to become a reporter at the newspaper for 17 years. Fenton is a two-time finalist for the national Livingston Award for Young Journalists. The Daily Record named Fenton as an "Influential Marylander" in 2018.

In 2010, Fenton's reporting sparked reforms in how the Baltimore Police Department investigated sexual assaults. Fenton was part of the Pulitzer Prize-finalist staff recognized for their coverage of the Baltimore riots that followed the killing of Freddie Gray. He was also one of the lead reporters on Baltimore's Gun Trace Task Force scandal, and later wrote a book based on the case, titled We Own This City, which was later produced by HBO into a TV mini series of the same name.

In 2022, Fenton left the Sun to join the upstart Baltimore Banner, where he currently works as an investigative reporter. He contributed to the Banner's reporting on sexual misconduct allegations against Baltimore Ravens kicker Justin Tucker, leading to Tucker's release from the Ravens and a 10-week suspension from the National Football League.
