= Baltimore Police Department =

Municipal law enforcement agency of Baltimore, Maryland, U.S.

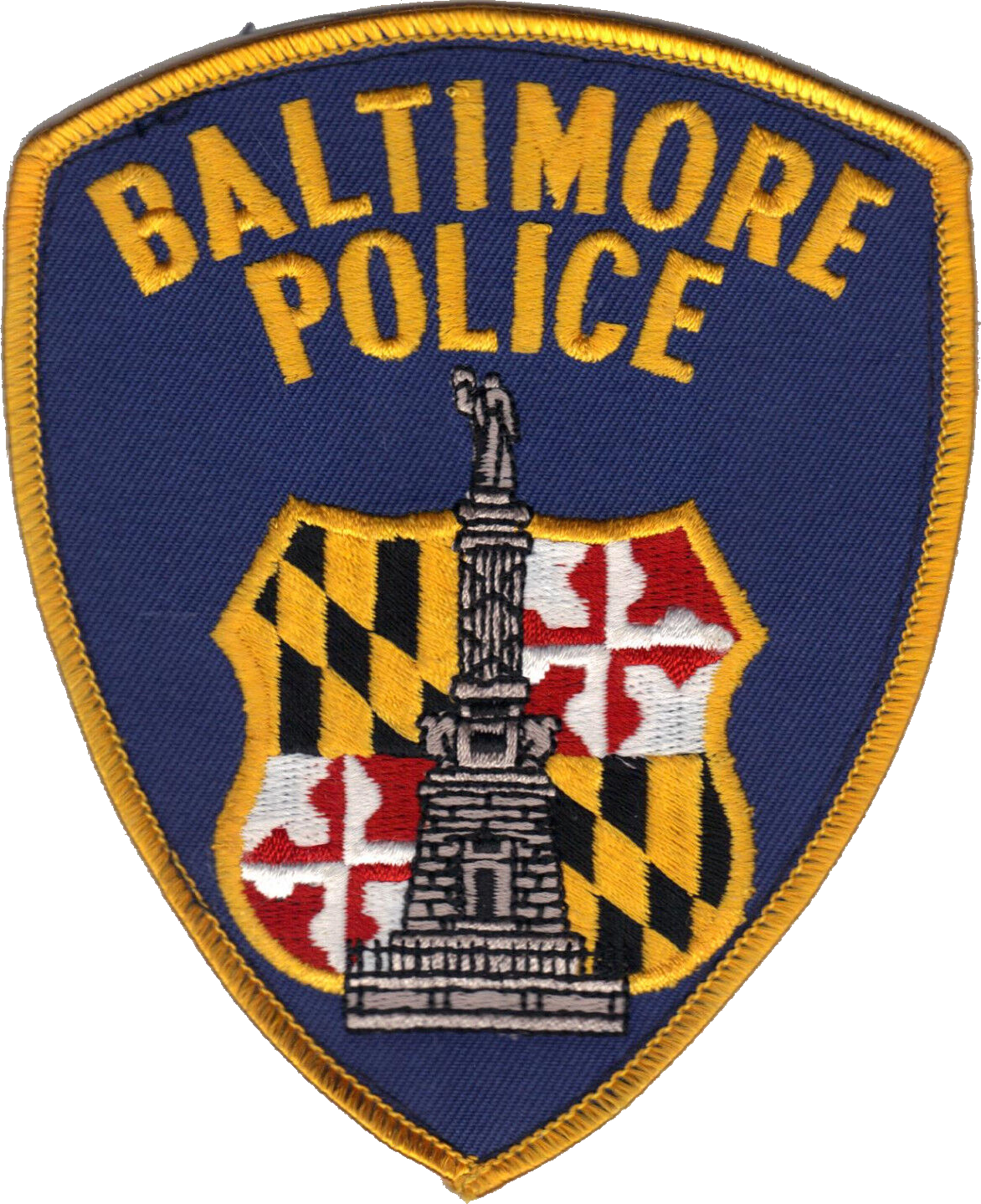
- Patch of the Baltimore Police Department

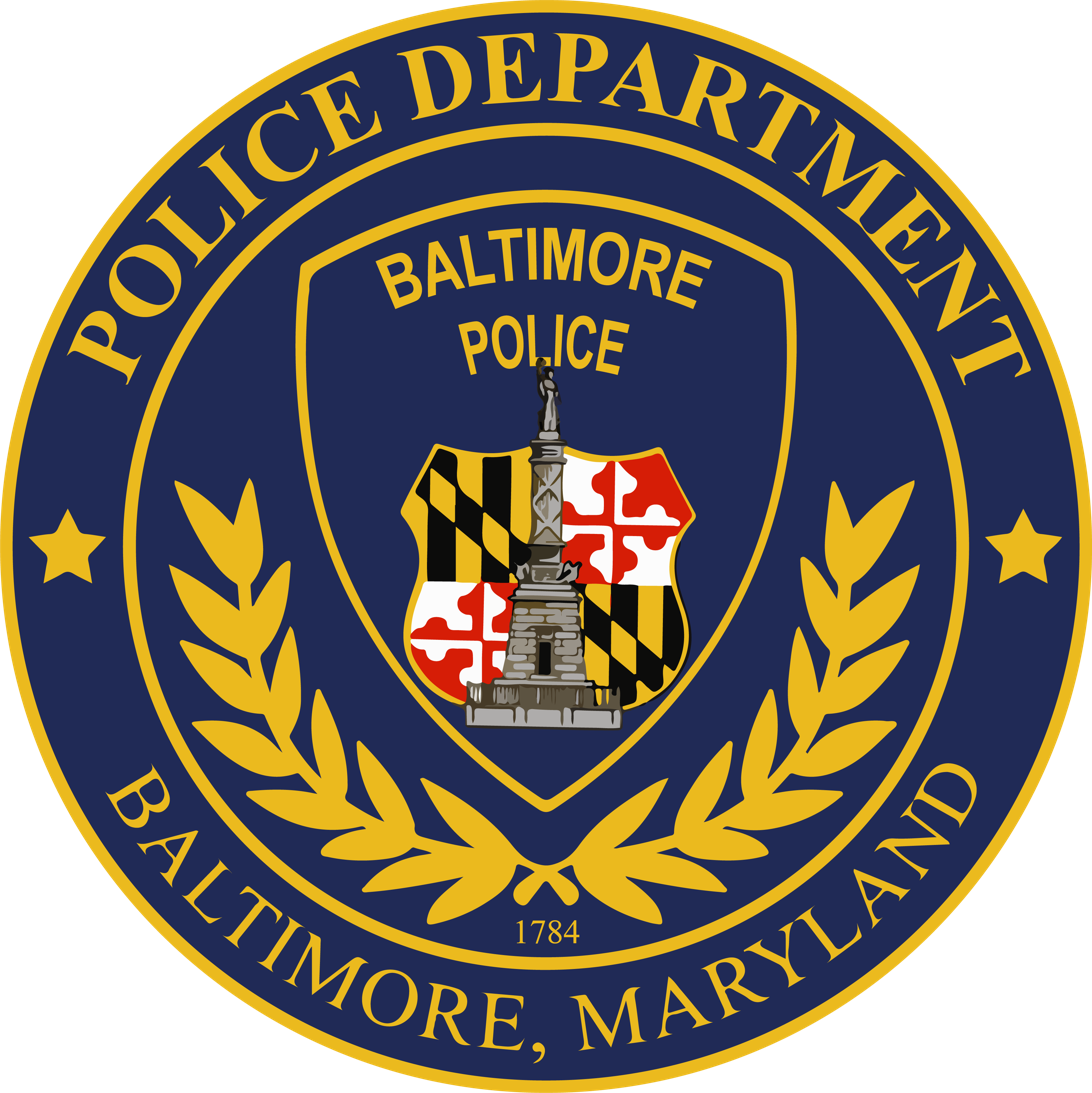
- Baltimore Police Department seal

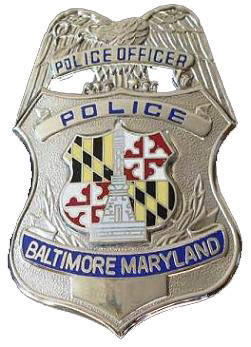
- Badge of the Baltimore Police Department
- Common name: Baltimore Police Department
- Abbreviation: BPD
- Motto: Semper Paratus, Semper Fideles, Ever on the Watch; Ever Ready, Ever Faithful, Ever on the Watch

Agency overview
- Formed: 1784; 242 years ago
- Employees: 3,110 (2026)
- Annual budget: $536 million (2020)

Jurisdictional structure
- Operations jurisdiction: Baltimore, Maryland, United States
- Baltimore Police Districts
- Area: 80.95 square miles (209.7 km^{2})
- Population: 602,495 (2018)
- Legal jurisdiction: Baltimore, Maryland
- General nature: Local civilian police

Operational structure
- Headquarters: Bishop L. Robinson, Sr. Police Administration Building; 601 E Fayette St Baltimore, Maryland 21202
- Officers: ▼2,023 of 2,515 (2025)
- Mayor of Baltimore responsible: Brandon Scott
- Agency executives: Richard Worley, Commissioner; Kevin A. Jones, Deputy Commissioner – Operations Bureau #2; Brian Nadeau, Deputy Commissioner – Public Integrity, Administration and Compliance Bureau #3
- Parent agency: Baltimore City Council

Facilities
- Districts: 1-Central; 2-Southeast; 3-Eastern; 4-Northeast; 5-Northern; 6-Northwest; 7-Western; 8-Southwest; 9-Southern
- Marked and unmarked vehicles: Chevrolet Suburbans, Tahoes, Caprices, Ford Taurus Interceptors, Utility Interceptors, Explorers, Escapes, Mustangs and Harley-Davidson Police Motorcycles, Toyota Tundra, Ford F150
- Boats: 4
- Helicopters: 4 (Nicknamed "foxtrot" or "fox" for short)
- Horses: 12

Website
- Baltimore Police Website

The Baltimore Police Department (BPD) is the municipal police department of the city of Baltimore, Maryland. Dating back to 1784, the BPD, consisting of 2,935 employees in 2020, is organized into nine districts covering 80.9 square miles (210 km^{2}) of land and 11.1 square miles (29 km^{2}) of waterways. The department is sometimes referred to as the Baltimore City Police Department to distinguish it from the Baltimore County Police Department.

== History ==
=== Foundation to the 1840s ===
The first attempt to establish professional policing in Baltimore was in 1784, nearly 60 years after the founding of the colonial town and eight years after United States independence. The city authorized a night watch and a force of day constables to enforce town laws, particularly catching runaway slaves. Nightwatchman George Workner was the first law enforcement officer to be killed in the city; he was stabbed during an escape attempt by nine inmates at Baltimore City Jail on March 14, 1808.

The department was founded in its current form (with uniforms and firearms) in 1853 by the Maryland state legislature "to provide for a better security for life and property in the City of Baltimore". The state did not give the city the power to run its own police affairs. The early decades of the department were marked by internal political conflict over split loyalties. In 1857 the police were reorganized by Mayor Thomas Swann and new men were recruited; many came from Know Nothing gangs in the city and maintained loyalties to former leaders. The first BPD officer to die in the line of duty was Sergeant William Jourdan, who was shot and killed by an unknown gunman during the first city council elections on October 14, 1857.

In 1861, during the U.S. Civil War, the police department was taken over by the federal government after police helped push pro-U.S. and pro-Confederate rioters into a full-out armed confrontation in the Baltimore riot of 1861. The U.S. military ran the police department until 1862, when they turned authority back to the state legislature.

The department introduced call boxes in 1885, the Bertillon identification system in 1896, and radio communications in 1933.

=== The 1930s to the Civil Rights era ===
The first African American officer hired by the department was a woman: Violet Hill Whyte, in 1937. The first black male officers (Walter T. Eubanks Jr., Harry S. Scott, Milton Gardner, and J. Hiram Butler Jr.) were hired the year after. They were all assigned to plainclothes duty to work undercover. In 1943, African Americans were allowed to wear police uniforms, and by 1950 there were 50 black officers in the department.

African American officers at this point were barred from using squad cars, hit a ceiling in promotion and were limited to patrolling black neighborhoods or assignments in the Narcotics Division or as undercover officers. They were subjected to racial harassment from both white coworkers (including the use of racial slurs during roll call) and African American residents (including degrading racial graffiti). Bishop L. Robinson and Edward J. Tilghman were two black police officers during this period; both later served as police commissioner. In 1962, Patrolman Henry Smith Jr. was the first African American officer to die in the line of duty; he was shot breaking up a dice game on North Milton Avenue.

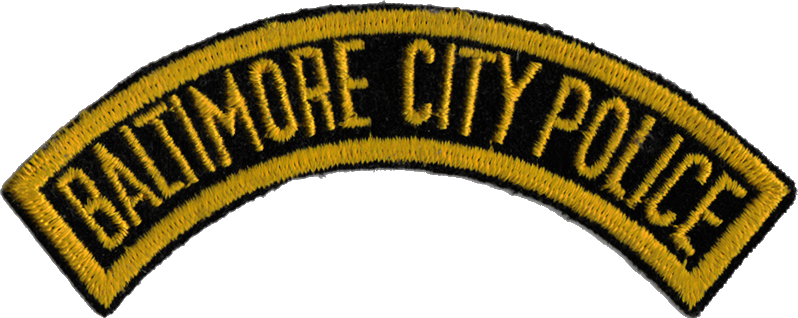
Baltimore City Police Rocker Patch used from 1952 to 1967

As with other American cities post-World War II suburbanization, encouraged by government programs, drew large numbers of white residents out of the city. There had always been a large African American minority in Baltimore, which had been growing steadily and became a majority in the mid 20th century. The police department remained dominated by whites; traditionally mostly Irish Americans.

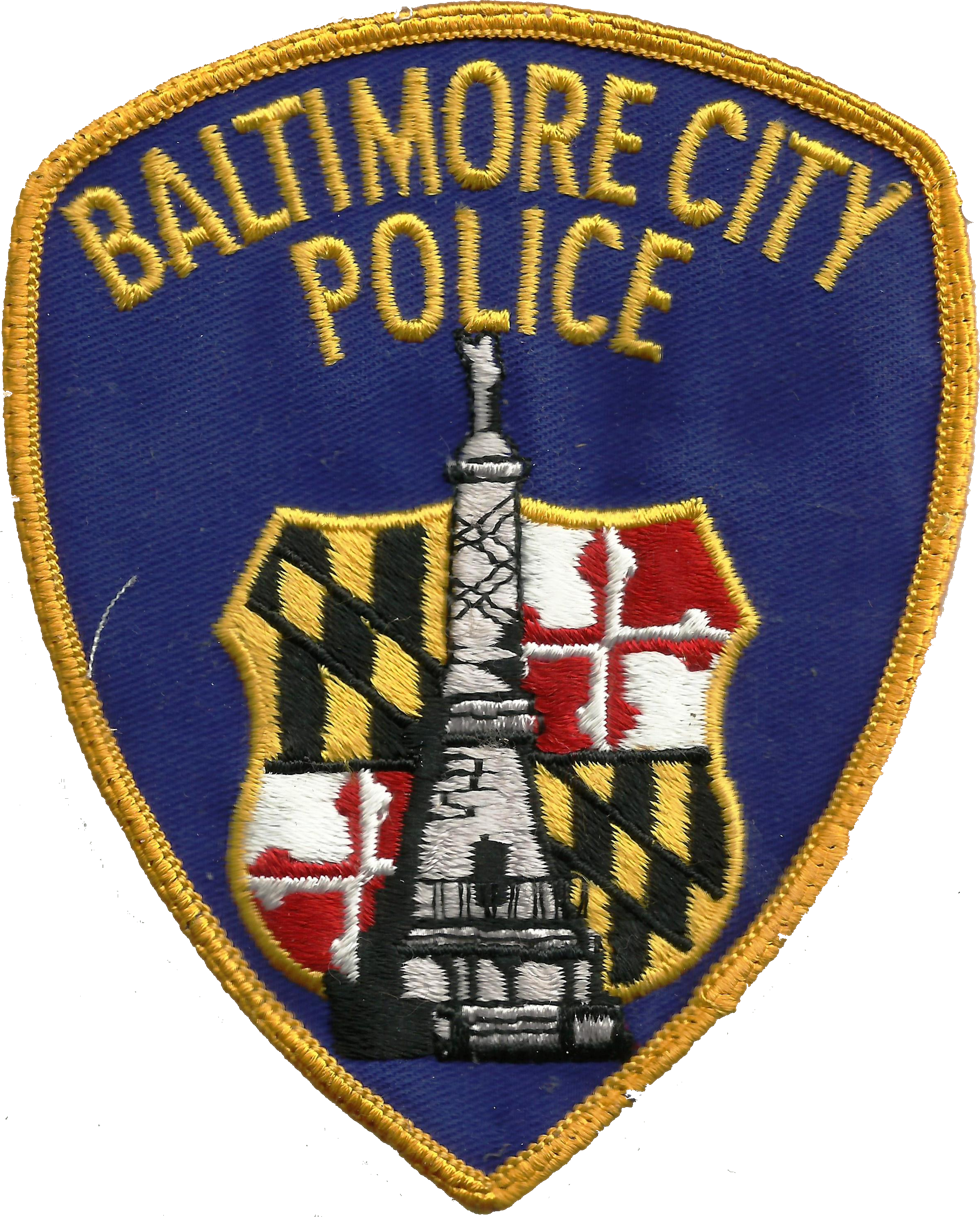
Baltimore City Police Patch used from 1968 to 1974

During the Civil Rights Movement, trust between the department and the predominantly black city became increasingly strained, as African Americans pressed for fair treatment and social justice. In the 1960s, race riots erupted in Baltimore and other cities. Some positive change was implemented under Commissioner Donald Pomerleau, appointed in 1966 after consulting for the International Association of Chiefs of Police in the city for two years and writing a damning report on the department. Pomerleau described the BPD as "the most corrupt and antiquated in the nation, and had developed almost no positive relationship with the city's Negro community". Pomerleau oversaw many reforms, including the racial integration of the department by 1966, also partly a result of the Civil Rights Act of 1964 and efforts by local black activists. However, the riot of 1968 broke out across the city's African-American neighborhoods in response to the assassination of Martin Luther King Jr. Because few black officers held rank within the department, the African American community was confronted by a white-dominated police department.

=== Late 20th century to present ===
In the latter part of the 20th century, restructuring of industry and railroads resulted in a massive loss of industrial jobs in Baltimore. These changes resulted in depopulation, unemployment and poverty; all serious challenges for the police department.

Police community relations were severely strained in Baltimore during the "war on drugs", as with other cities, adding to the stresses of several African American neighborhoods in East and West Baltimore already hollowed out by drug use. African American police officers were intensely disliked, as were white ones.

In 1971, African American officers founded the Vanguard Justice Society, to represent their rights and interests. Throughout the 1970s, more African Americans advanced in the department; Black officers were promoted to positions of district commanders and chief of patrol.

In July 1974, officers joined other striking municipal workers for five days during the Baltimore police strike.

In 1984, Mayor Donald Schaefer appointed veteran police officer Bishop L. Robinson as Baltimore's first black police commissioner. The department had previously long been dominated by ethnic Irish American and briefly by Italian Americans. Robinson had been the force's first Black officer to command the Eastern District and the Patrol Division. The department redefined several of its policies in effort to avoid the mistakes other departments made in the Watts riots of Los Angeles and Liberty City riots in Miami.

The department began using computerized booking procedures and 911 emergency systems in 1985, and created the first ever 311 non-emergency system in 1996. CCTV cameras began to be used in the same year.

==== Zero-tolerance under Martin O'Malley ====
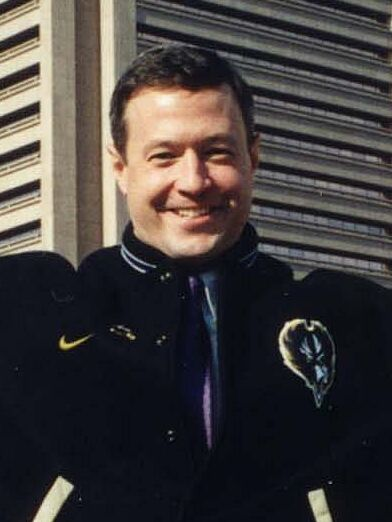
Martin O'Malley in 2001

After he was elected mayor of Baltimore in 1999, Martin O'Malley instituted a policy of zero tolerance modeled after that of New York City. He made Ed Norris, a deputy commissioner of the New York City Police Department (NYPD), commissioner of the BPD in 2000 and hired the creators of CompStat, a management system used by the NYPD, to write a report analyzing the BPD. The report claimed that residents saw the police as unwilling to counter the illegal drug trade, officers felt unsupported, and almost a quarter of BPD officers believed a quarter of their colleagues stole drugs and money from criminals. After this report, the BPD ran over 200 sting operations against officers, of which only four officers failed.

Norris was replaced by Kevin P. Clark, also from the NYPD, who sought to counter the illegal drug trade using two strategies: teaching more undercover detectives to buy drugs and citing suspected dealers for petty crimes. In 2003, Norris was indicted and sentenced to six months in prison for misusing an unreported bank account as commissioner. Clark was removed by O'Malley in 2004 amid accusations of domestic violence.

In 2005, a DVD titled Stop Fucking Snitching began to spread throughout Baltimore, deriding dealers who cooperate with the police. In one scene, a person accuses a group of dealers in West Baltimore of being protected by William King and Antonio Murray, a duo of BPD officers. Other drug dealers helped the case against the duo: in one case, a dealer who was supplied drugs by King and Murray to split the profit but told he would face consequences if he didn't help take down other dealers reported King and Murray to the Federal Bureau of Investigation. King and Murray were convicted of around 36 charges and sentenced to 315 years and one month and 139 years in prison, respectively.

Under O'Malley's zero-tolerance policy, arrests increased to over 100,000 in 2005, of which only two-thirds were prosecuted. While O'Malley rejected the notion that his policies "encourage[d] arrests for the sake of arrests", officers later claimed that BPD culture encouraged making many arrests. Under O'Malley, the department was made up of 43% African American officers.

==== Under Sheila Dixon and Frederick H. Bealefeld III ====
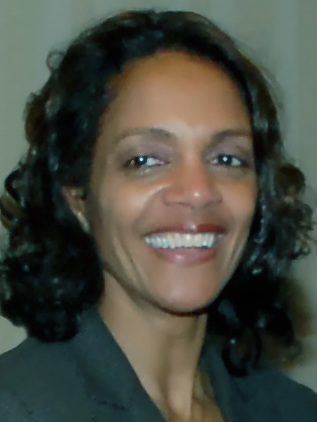
Sheila Dixon

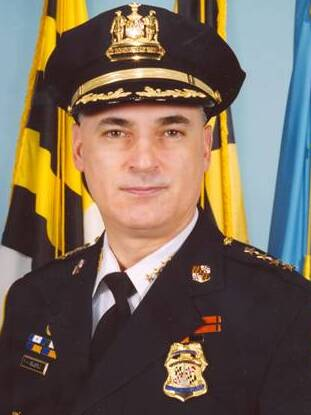
Frederick H. Bealefeld III

After Martin O'Malley became governor of Maryland, acting mayor Sheila Dixon sought to move away from her predecessor's policy. She appointed Frederick H. Bealefeld III, a member of the department's narcotics and homicide units and the de facto head of the department for a few months, as commissioner of the BPD.

Bealefeld wished to shift the department from focusing on drugs and indiscriminate arrests towards repeat offenders and illegal guns. Bealefeld also helped improve officer training. Bealefeld appointed Anthony Barksdale as deputy commissioner of operations. Barksdale believed that while tough policing was needed, the department could control itself with tight oversight. The BPD formed the Violent Crimes Impact Division, a roughly 300-member plainclothes unit of high-ranking officers. The department identified high-risk areas and kept these officers in those areas.

In 2007, shootings decreased and the homicide rate went below 200 for the first time since the 1980s. Despite this, officer-involved shootings doubled, and the BPD did not review if these shootings were avoidable and followed department rules. Patricia Jessamy, state's attorney of Baltimore, created a "do not call" list for cops known to have poor integrity but who remained employed. These officers could not be called as witnesses of a crime, which high-ranking officers and the police union opposed. The department proposed a "gun offender registry", where people convicted of gun-related crimes would be checked for compliance.

==== Modern day ====
Following the death of Freddie Gray in police custody in 2015, there was rioting in black neighborhoods. The city invited the Department of Justice to conduct an investigation of the police department and its relations with the community. It found evidence of widespread unconstitutional and discriminatory police practices in the city, especially in poor, black neighborhoods.

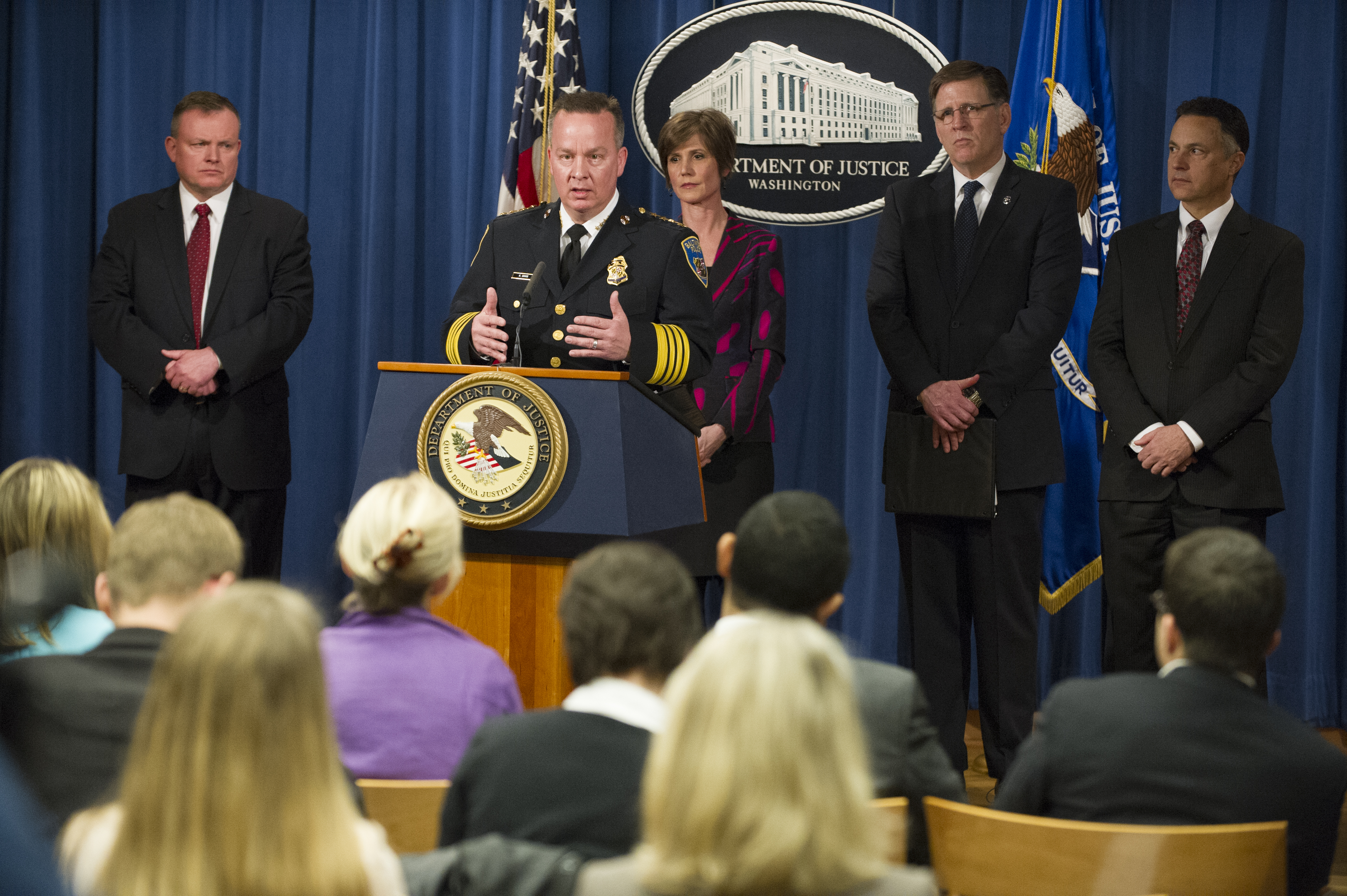
Kevin Davis speaks at the US Department of Justice in 2016. Davis was Commissioner of the Baltimore Police Department from 2015 to 2018

Following reporting from the investigation, the city, police department and the Civil Rights Division of DOJ negotiated a consent decree,

including limits on when and how the [police] can engage individuals suspected of criminal activity. It orders more training for police on de-escalation tactics and interactions with youths, those with mental illness and protesters, as well as more supervision for officers.

U.S. District Judge James K. Bredar approved the decree in early April 2017, with commitment from Mayor Catherine Pugh and Police Commissioner Kevin Davis to make the changes proposed. Pugh already had included $10 million in the city budget for this purpose. The city will also be required to invest in better technology and equipment, and "for the Police Department to enhance civilian oversight and transparency." He denied a Department of Justice request to postpone signing the decree for 30 days in order to allow review by the Trump Administration.

On May 10, 2018, newly appointed Police Commissioner Darryl De Sousa was charged in U.S. District Court with three misdemeanor counts of failing to file federal taxes for 2013, 2014 and 2015. Mayor Catherine Pugh initially expressed support for De Sousa, but a day later she suspended him with pay pending the resolution of the charges against him. De Sousa resigned several days later.

In 2021, the Maryland General Assembly passed a bill to transfer full control of the department from the state to the city. The transfer is contingent on city voters' approval of a charter amendment. Mayor Brandon Scott plans to assemble a panel tasked with finding ways that funding could be shifted from police to other agencies. Though Gov. Larry Hogan publicly questioned Scott's plans, he let the bill become law without his signature.

As of 2021, 60% of sworn BPD officers were racial or ethnic minorities, with both black and white officers making up 40% of the force. Female officers comprised 15% of the department.

=== Mergers ===
The department absorbed the City Park Police in the early 1960s. In 2005, the Housing Authority Police were disbanded and operations taken over by the Baltimore Police Department. Housing Authority officers had to reapply for jobs with the city police, losing any previous seniority. In the 2010s, there has been discussion of merging the Baltimore Schools Police into the department as well.

== Rank structure and insignia ==
Title	Insignia	Uniform shirt color	Badge color
Police Commissioner		White	Gold
Deputy Police Commissioner		White	Gold
Police Colonel		White	Gold
Police Lieutenant Colonel		White	Gold
Police Major		White	Gold
Police Captain		White	Gold
Police Lieutenant		White	Gold
Police Sergeant		Navy Blue	Silver
Police Officer/Detective	Abbreviated District Symbols	Navy Blue	Silver
Police Academy Cadet	No Insignia	Black W/Tan Khakis	Silver

Promotion is possible after three years of service. Opportunities for advanced training are provided, including specialized firearms training, defense tactics, and job-related topics such as basic criminal investigation. Hash marks, one for every five years service, will be worn on the left sleeve of the uniform as of 2015. In July 2016 the ranks of Lieutenant Colonel and Colonel were intended to be eliminated as a streamlining and standardization measure, with all affected personnel being appointed to the rank of Chief, a title formerly used only by certain civilian employees within the department. However, as of 2025 both Colonel and Lieutenant Colonel ranks are still in use.

== Organization ==
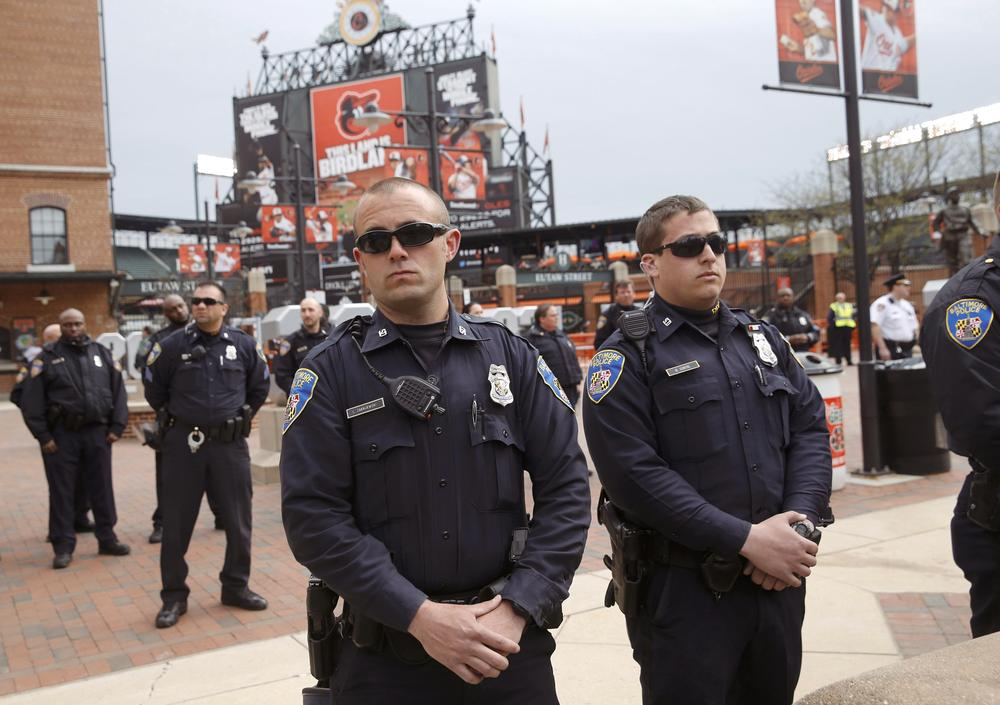
Baltimore Police Officers at Camden Yards

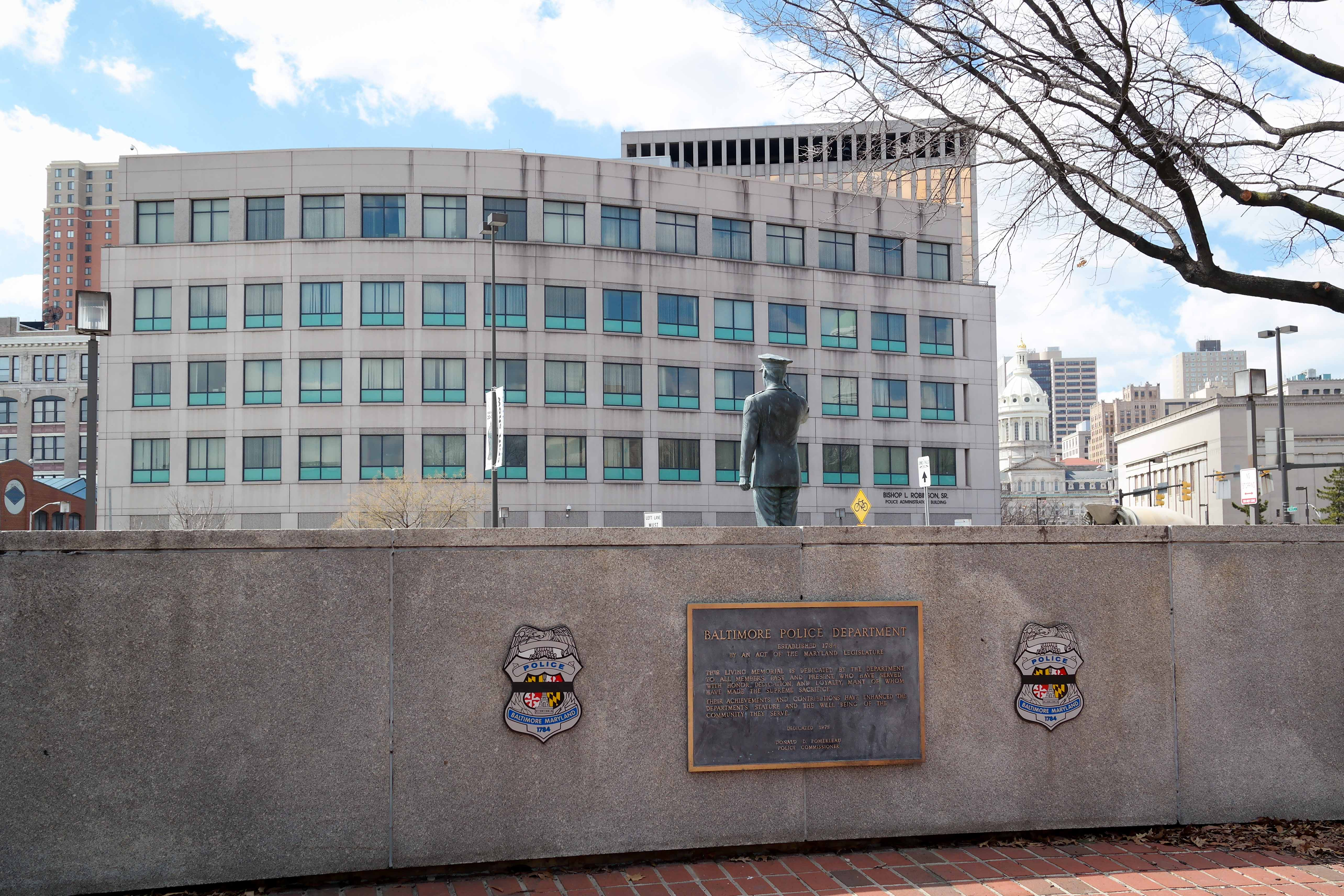
Bishop L. Robinson Sr. Police Administrative Building Annex

The Baltimore Police Department has 2,935 sworn and civilian personnel, including dispatchers, crime lab technicians, chaplains, and unarmed auxiliary police officers. Officers are assigned to one of nine districts in the city or a specialized unit. Officers in patrol units work 5 eight-hour shifts a week.

As of 2024, the department is administered by Police Commissioner Richard Worley. The Commissioner is head of the department. Under him are two Deputy Commissioners, one heading the Operations Bureaus, and the other heading the Public Integrity, Compliance and Administrative Bureaus. In addition, the rank of Colonel and Lieutenant Colonel generally serve as the head of a particular section or division across the entire agency (Patrol, Criminal Investigations, Neighborhood Services, etc.). The rank of Major is assigned to those who develop, implement, coordinate, and ultimately supervise the day-to-day activities of the department in notable areas of prominence (Special Operations, Homicide/Shootings, Communications, etc.), as well as to those who serve as the commanding officer of each district. In a similar fashion, apart from those serving as the Major's Executive Officer at the district level, Captains may also oversee a particular sub-division as well (Traffic, Tactical, Major Crimes). Lieutenants are tasked with being the shift commander within their respective districts. Some jobs are filled by non-sworn personnel as Directors and Coordinators; in particular, the civilian chief financial officer who oversees the Management Services Division.

== Equipment ==
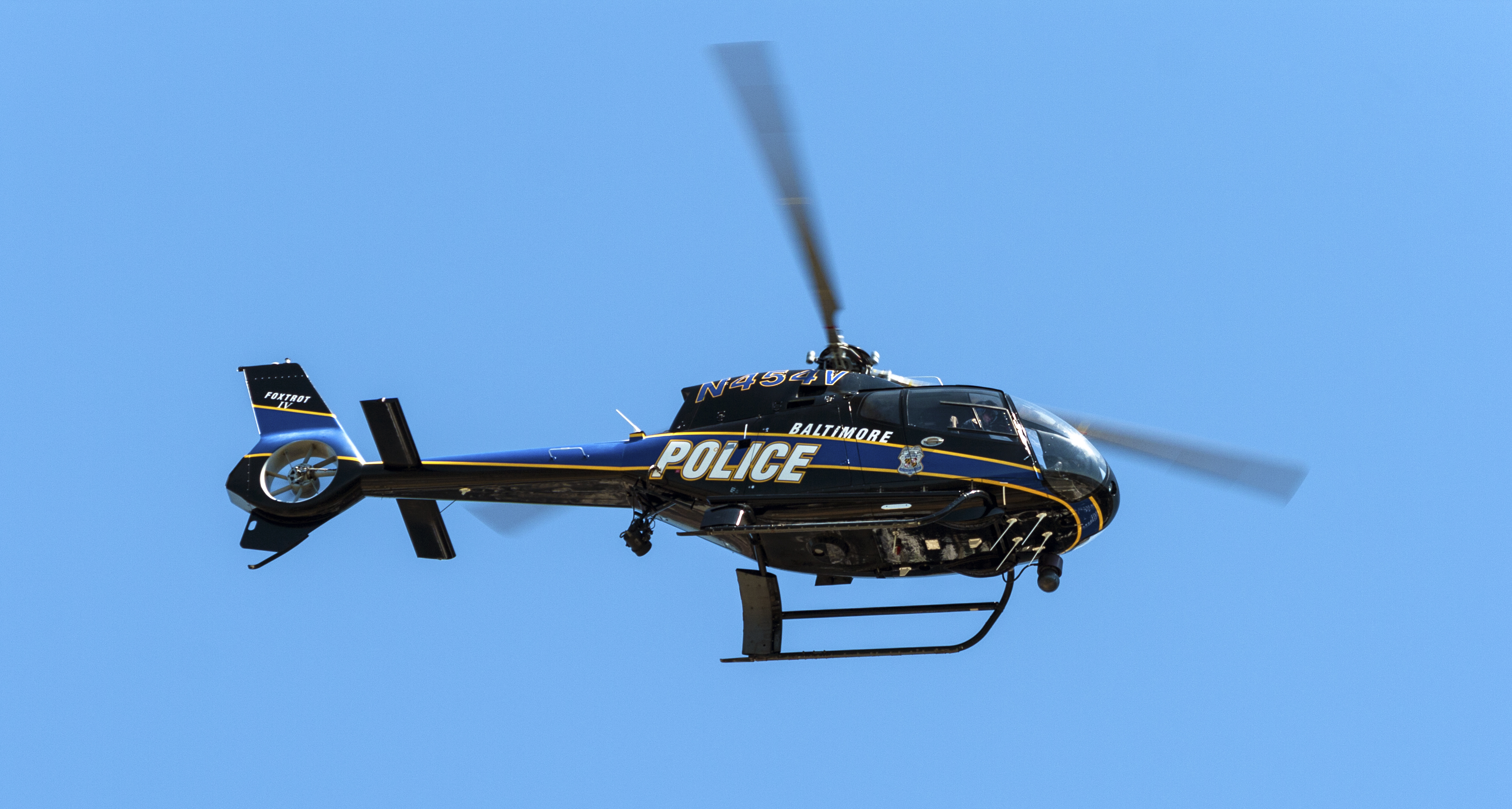
Helicopter of the Baltimore Police Department

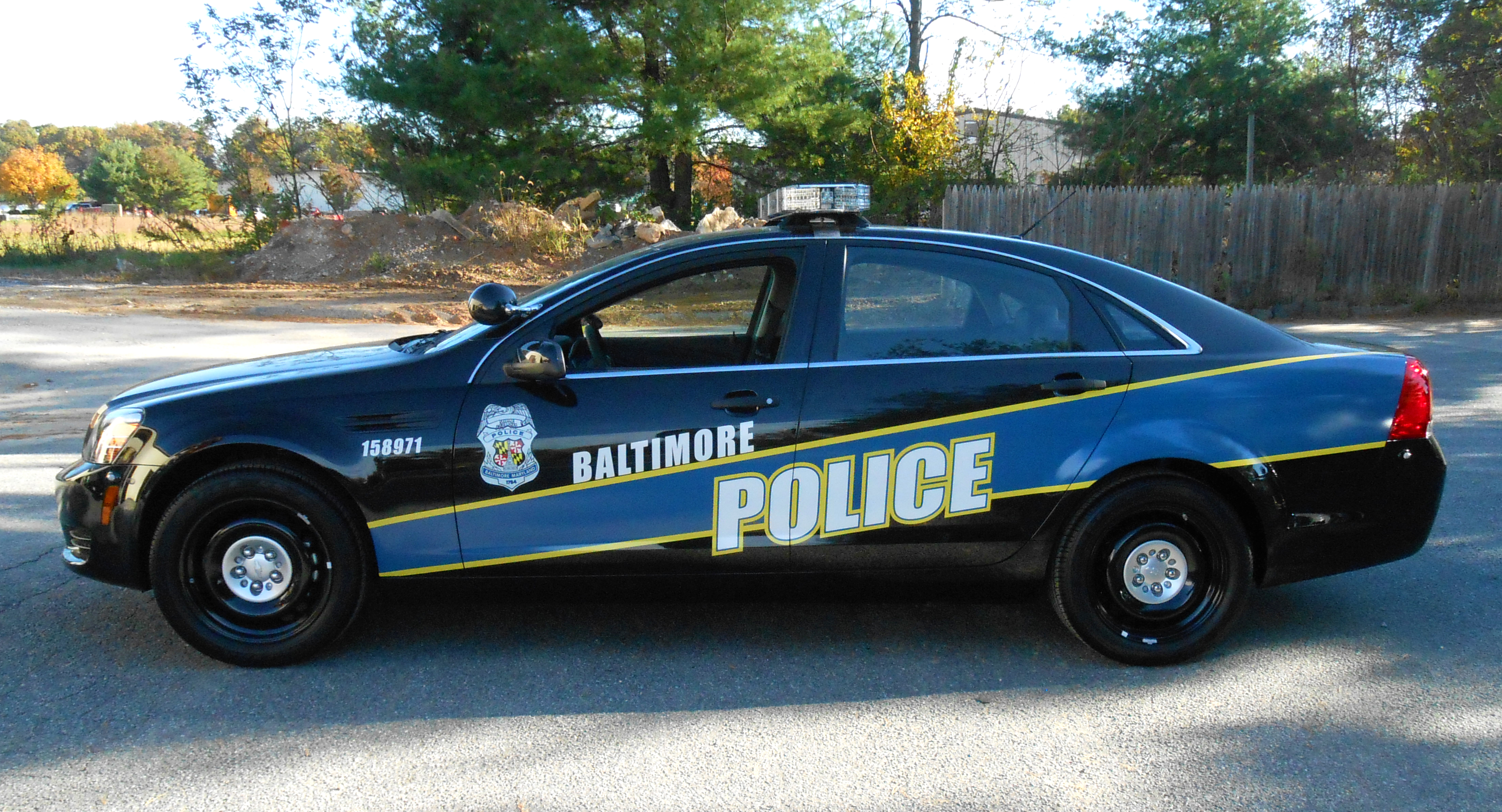
Baltimore Police Department Chevy Caprice

=== Cars and motorcycles ===
The main squad cars used by the department are the Ford Crown Victoria Police Interceptor and Chevrolet Caprice, along with Harley Davidson motorcycles. Newer versions of the Ford Taurus SHO and Chevrolet Caprice are being implemented. Some older Chevrolet Impalas are still in service. Unmarked Dodge Chargers, Chevrolet Cobalts and Impalas and assorted Kias are used by some command staff and specialized units.

The older vehicle paint scheme was white with blue and silver striping and a replica of an officer's badge on the front doors. A new black paint scheme with blue and yellow stripes is gradually being implemented. As of 2021 the introduction of Ford Interceptor Utilities began the retirement of Caprices, Impalas and Tauruses due to age, high mileage or general retirement from discontinued models. With the 2020-2022 Ford Explorer being delivered, the department has now found itself transitioning back from black to white for the primary vehicle color. The stripes largely remained unchanged.

=== Weapons ===
The BPD is transitioning to a new department-issued duty pistol. Over the next two years, the current Glock 22 duty pistol (chambered in .40S&W) will be replaced with the Glock 45 MOS7 duty pistol (chambered in 9mm). More importantly, in addition to traditional iron sights, each new Glock 45 will be fitted with an Aimpoint ACRO P2 red-dot sight (RDS). The primary service weapon is the Glock 22 .40 caliber pistol, replacing the Glock 17 9mm pistol. Officers are also issued a Monadnock expandable straight baton, TASER 7 and pepper spray. Lethal and less-lethal Remington 870 shotguns are available for patrol. In 2014, the department began its patrol rifle program, issuing Colt LE6920 rifles to selected members of the patrol division. The department's SWAT team (originally the Quick Response Team) carried a mix of weapons in its early years, including M1 carbines, M16 assault rifles, Colt 9 mm SMGs and Ruger Mini 14 rifles. In the early 2000s, SWAT rearmed with a mix of UMP40 sub machine guns and G36K assault rifles. In 2014, SWAT replaced their assault rifles with the Colt LE6946CQB.

The espantoon is an ornate, straight wooden baton with a long swiveled leather strap designed for twirling. It is distinct to the city of Baltimore and has been in use for generations. Between 1994 and 2000, the espantoon was banned by commissioner Thomas Frazier in favor of the koga stick due to the perception that its twirling intimidated the citizenry. In 2000, Edward T. Norris became commissioner and lifted the ban on the espantoon to raise staff morale and instill a more aggressive approach to policing, although he did not make its use mandatory. Norris stated, "When I found out what they meant to the rank and file, I said, 'Bring them back.' ... It is a tremendous part of the history of this Police Department."

=== Uniform ===
Sergeants and below wear a navy blue shirt and pants, with a felt stripe down the pant leg, with any rank insignia on the sleeve and collar devices denoting district or unit. Lieutenants and above wear a white shirt with navy blue pants, with rank insignias on the collar. Nametags are worn above the right breast pocket, and sleeve patches are worn on both arms. Ties are worn with the long sleeve uniform shirt. Turtlenecks with BPD embroidered in gold letters at the collar may be worn with the long sleeve uniform in lieu of a tie. Short sleeve uniform shirts are authorized for warmer months.

The 8-point peaked cap is worn by all officers. Its cap device is the Maryland Coat of Arms; silver for those below the rank of Lieutenant, gold for Lieutenants, and gold with coloured detail for Captains and above. The hat has a chin strap; black for Police Officers and Detectives, blue for Sergeants and gold for Lieutenants and above. Captains and above have gold fretting on their visor. Police Officers have their badge number below the coat of arms, while Detectives and any supervisory rank has their title below the coat of arms.

The current badge was designed in 1976. It is a shield, with "Police" written at the top, the Maryland state shield with the Battle Monument in the middle, and the words "Baltimore Maryland" and the officer's badge number at the bottom. An eagle is perched on top, holding a ribbon in its beak showing the officer's rank. Badges are silver for those below Lieutenant, and gold for Lieutenants and above.

== Criticism ==
BPD has experienced negative publicity due to several high-profile corruption and brutality allegations, including the 2005 arrest of Officers William A. King and Antonio L. Murray by the FBI for federal drug conspiracy charges.

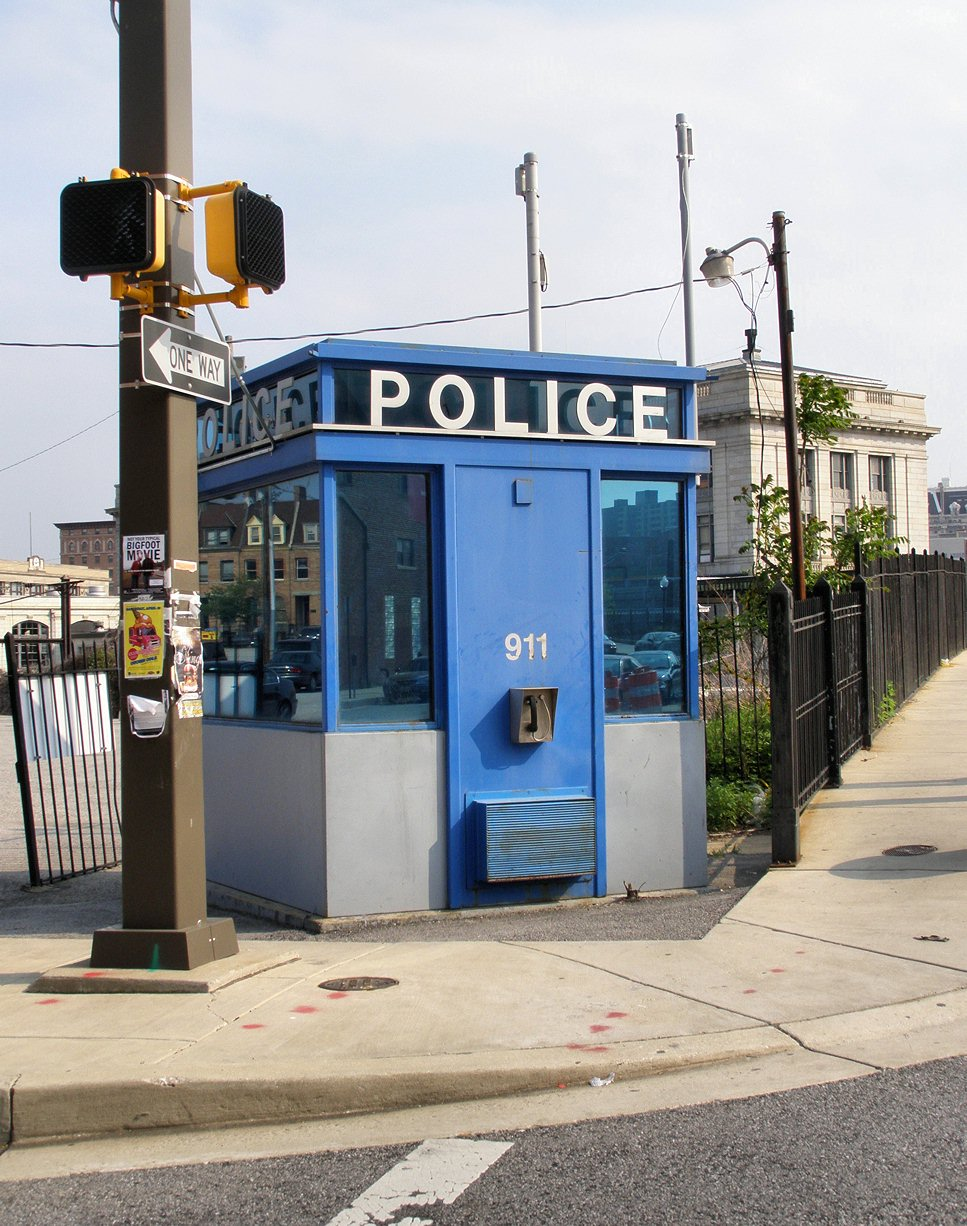
Police box on North Charles Street near Penn Station

During the past generation, the Baltimore Police Department has faced criticism from local media, elected officials, and citizen advocacy groups. The criticism has pertained to the high crime rate in the city of Baltimore, which in some years has been ranked among the highest in the nation.

=== Arrests for minor offenses ===
In the mid-2000s, Maryland State Delegate Jill P. Carter, daughter of local civil rights leader, Walter P. Carter, publicized numerous cases of the Baltimore City Police arresting people for seemingly minor offenses, detaining them at Central Booking for several hours. Many were released without charges. Some were reportedly detained at Central Booking for several days before seeing a court commissioner. All arrestees in Maryland are required to have an initial appearance before a court commissioner within 24 hours of their arrest.

The exposure of these cases led to judicial and legislative action. In 2005, the Maryland Court of Appeals ordered all arrestees not charged within 24 hours to be released.

On May 16, 2006, a Baltimore City police officer, Natalie Preston, arrested a Virginia couple for asking for directions to a major highway. The couple, released after seven hours in city jail, were not charged with any crime. They were initially taken into custody for trespassing on a public street. Their vehicle was impounded at the city lot, with windows down and doors unlocked, resulting in theft of several personal items.

In 2007, the state of Maryland passed a law requiring the automatic expungement of the record of one who is arrested, but then released without being charged, thereby eliminating the dilemma many such victims faced that would prevent them from passing a criminal background check if the record remained, but would not allow for a wrongful arrest lawsuit if the record were expunged.

On June 23, 2010, a $870,000 comprehensive settlement was reached which culminated more than a year of negotiations between the city and plaintiffs. The settlement provides for far-reaching reforms of the BPD's arrest and monitoring practices. The suit, which was filed in 2006, and amended in 2007, was brought on behalf of thirteen individual plaintiffs and the Maryland State Conference and Baltimore City Branch of the NAACP.

=== 2016 Justice Department report ===
In 2016, the United States Justice Department issued a 163-page report which "condemned many long-standing discriminatory enforcement practices by Baltimore police that allowed for illegal searches, arrests and stops of African Americans for minor offenses." The highly critical report also chastised the department's "zero tolerance" and "broken windows" policing, and found that the department's practices "regularly discriminated against black residents in poor communities".

In April 2017, U.S. District Judge James K. Bredar approved a consent decree signed by the Baltimore Police Department and former acting U.S. Assistant Attorney General Vanita Gupta, rejecting an objection by new U.S. Attorney General Jeff Sessions.

=== Aerial surveillance ===
In 2016, continuous aerial surveillance was disclosed. The program had private funding from John D. Arnold, and was contracted to Persistent Surveillance Systems Inc.

=== Allegations of witness coaching ===
Attorney Susan Simpson, working with the Undisclosed podcast, investigated the 2001 murder conviction of Adnan Syed for the 1999 killing of Hae Min Lee. She found that during a Baltimore police interview of witness Jay Wilds, when Wilds didn't know what to say a tapping sound would be heard, after which Wilds suddenly knew what to say. The podcast said that this tapping was detectives showing Wilds what they thought was the correct answer. Wilds himself later said that he was coached to say that he first saw the victim's body at a certain Best Buy.

=== List of unreliable police officers ===
On 4 October 2019, Baltimore State's Attorney Marilyn Mosby said she had begun the process of asking courts to throw out 790 convictions which depended on the testimony of 25 Baltimore police officers who she said were discredited. On 14 October 2019, Baltimore State's Attorney Marilyn Mosby said she had a list of "hundreds of officers" who had allegations of misconduct that called their credibility into question.

== Notable incidents ==
=== Police Commissioner James M. Hepbron ===
Commissioner James M. Hepbron was subject to a hearing on February 19, 1959, led by Jerome Robinson, Democratic State Delegate for the fourth district. Delegate Robinson had a long history of challenging wiretapping and search warrants, as he believed the practice unconstitutional, against Federal law and a violation of the natural rights of the citizen. In the 90-day public hearing and investigation, Robinson stated that the commissioner "demonstrate[d] lack of a sense of propriety and in several respects a lack of comprehension on the part of the commissioner of the nature of his duties, the functions of the department, and the obligations to the citizenry". During the public hearing Hepbron incessantly left the hearing and/or refused to answer specifications against him.

During the hearing, Robinson urged the commissioner to resign in the public interest. Robinson wrote, "it is obvious that he has outlived his position. His administration has produced continuing deterioration and the demoralization of the department".

The charges against Hepbron included:

- Flouting of the civil and constitutional rights of the citizens of Baltimore City. Illegal taps of private and public telephone lines.
- Errors in judgment and administration.
- Concepts of policing which, because of brutality and insensitivity, are shocking to decent thinking people.

Despite considerable evidence, Hebron denied to address he was acting illegally. Delegate Robinson cited 36 instances where the cases were dropped or defendants released because of planted evidence and other means of framing suspects. He called these offenses, "a creature of commissioner Hepbron". Robinson also cited the Green Spring Avenue assault by a police officer of a 15-year-old boy, countless shootings of unarmed auto-thieves, and illegal raids on properly licensed establishments. At one point Robinson stated the head of the city police was "an SS officer in a Chesterfield coat who is impatient with the Bill of Rights and intolerant of the constitutional liberties and prerogatives of the people"

Alvin J. T. Zumbrun, former managing director of the Criminal Justice Commission, issued a statement against Robinson in the commissioner's defense. He described the charges brought against Hepbron "the utterances of an angry madman possessed with the mania to have the police commissioner removed at all costs." Zumbrun cited details of multiple instances where he believed Robinson had lied, citing instances as small as a phone call, office visit or passing informal greeting by Robinson to Zumbrun. While Zumbrun's evidence never addressed actual police violations of state law, Zumbrun continued to press for the expulsion of Robinson of the General Assembly of Maryland to Governor J. Millard Tawes.

=== Ed Norris ===
In December 2003, former Commissioner Ed Norris was indicted on three charges by US Attorney Thomas DiBiagio. Two of the counts charged Norris had made illegal personal expenditures from the Baltimore Police Department's supplemental account. The third alleged that he had lied on a mortgage application, stating that approximately $9,000 he received from his father was not a gift—as was stated in the loan papers—but a loan. As part of a plea bargain in May 2004, Norris pleaded guilty to the first two counts and was sentenced to six months in federal prison, six months of home detention, and 500 hours of community service, which Judge Dick Bennett said must be served in Baltimore. The plea bargain avoided a possible 30-year sentence on the mortgage fraud charge.

=== Flex Squad scandal ===
A rash of high-profile corruption and brutality allegations surfaced in late 2005 and early 2006, including the suspension and arrest of officers in a so-called "flex squad" for the alleged rape of a 22-year-old woman they had taken into custody for illegal possession of narcotics. All criminal charges against the accused officers have since been dropped.

Stories subsequently surfaced about flex squad officers planting evidence. Murder charges were dropped when it was revealed that a gunman was dropped off in rival gang territory after a police interrogation in a squad car. The man was beaten badly and exacted his revenge the next day. The squad's role in the shooting prompted State's Attorney Patricia Jessamy to drop the charges.

=== Gerard Mungo ===
On 17 March 2007, police arrested seven-year-old Gerard Mungo while he was sitting in front of his house on a dirtbike. Though he was seated on the dirtbike at the time of the arrest, officers reported they saw him riding it earlier. Local law prohibits the operation of vehicles with an engine capacity of less than 50cc inside the city limits. Ordinances passed by city council, Article 19 Section 40-6, states that any and all unregistered motor bikes, dirt bikes, scooters, or anything similar in nature is illegal in Baltimore City. Officers stated they were "following procedure" in making a physical arrest.

=== Officer John Torres ===
In 2008, BPD officer John Torres shot and killed another officer, Norman Stamp. In 2014, Torres was arrested for attempted murder. The Baltimore Police Department has been accused of a coverup.

=== Salvatore Rivieri ===
Baltimore Police officer Salvatore Rivieri came to national attention in February 2008, following the releases of two videos depicting separate incidents in which he verbally, and in one case, physically, brutalized citizens.

The first video was posted to YouTube on February 9, 2008 and demonstrated Officer Rivieri berating and manhandling Eric Bush, a 14-year-old boy, who reportedly had been skateboarding in a tourist area of Inner Harbor where skateboarding is not permitted. In the video, Rivieri threatened to "smack [Bush] upside the head" if the boy continued to "back-talk", get "defensive", and give him "attitude". The officer subsequently wrestled Bush to the ground, then when the boy tried to stand back up, shoved him back down, confiscated his skateboard, and asked if he was "from the county, or something". Rivieri also said that Bush's parents "obviously" did not "put a foot in [the boy's] butt quite enough", and that someone would kill Bush if the boy did not learn "the meaning of respect" or "how to speak" and continued to "go around, doing this kind of stuff". The officer proceeded to order Bush to sit down, and before the boy could do so, yelled "did you not just hear me?!" Rivieri then interrogated whether Bush would "go to school...give [his] teacher this kind of lip, and back-talk [his] teacher", and stated that while onlookers, the boy's apparent friends, had "brains in their head" and knew "when to shut their mouths", Bush would "just keep flapping". The officer seemed particularly angered by Bush addressing him as "dude"; at various points in the video, he yelled:

"Sit down, I'm not a dude!"

"Call me 'dude' one more time!"

"I'm not man, I'm not dude! I am Officer Rivieri!"

"Stop calling me 'dude!' A dude is someone who works on a ranch!"

After the video surfaced, BPD suspended Rivieri with pay while conducting an investigation the incident. The story made national headlines and prompted a Washington, D.C. man to come forward with footage of a separate altercation between himself and the officer.

On February 15, 2008, ABC affiliate WMAR-TV aired a second video involving Officer Rivieri, in which he confronted an artist. The artist, Billy Friebele, was making a film depicting the reactions of passersby to a small box he was moving around a sidewalk with a remote-controlled car hidden underneath. In the video, Officer Rivieri kicked the device twice and "suggest[ed]" that Friebele "start moving." In an interview with WMAR-TV, the artist stated that Rivieri threatened to "kick [Friebele's] ass" if the artist did not leave the area.

In April 2008, in the wake of the incidents, BPD replaced the sergeant and lieutenant commanding the 12 officers patrolling the Inner Harbor area, from the edge of Federal Hill to the Fallsway, near Pier 5. Sterling Clifford, a police department spokesman, said: "Given the extreme nature of that incident, we thought it was important for the officers to brush up on their interpersonal skills."

Eric Bush's mother filed a lawsuit against Rivieri in April 2008, two months after the video circulated, seeking $6 million for assault, battery, and violation of rights. The city sought to have the case dismissed, arguing that such claims must be filed within 180 days of the incident. However, the Bush family's attorney argued that the statute of limitations did not apply to a minor. On December 11, 2008, Baltimore Circuit Judge Marcus Z. Shar ruled that the lawsuit could proceed. On September 14, 2009, Rivieri's motion for summary judgment was granted by Circuit Judge Evelyn Cannon, dismissing the suit. William P. Blackford, the Bush family's attorney, said of the judgment: "The family is incredibly disappointed, and feels wronged...they've had their day in court taken away."

In early 2009, the Baltimore Police Department cited death threats received by Rivieri as justification for no longer disclosing the names of police officers who shoot or kill citizens. Rivieri was eventually cleared of using excessive force and discourtesies by an internal police panel, but convicted of the administrative charge of failure to file a report. The panel recommended that he be suspended five days, but Police Commissioner Frederick H. Bealefeld III disagreed and fired him. On February 28, 2011, the firing of Rivieri was upheld.

=== Anthony Fata ===
In January 2011, Detective Anthony Fata reported he had been shot in a parking structure near police headquarters. In August 2013, he was convicted on various charges of benefits fraud, having in fact shot himself.

=== Daniel G. Redd ===
On July 19, 2011, Officer Daniel G. Redd was arrested for drug trafficking. While on trial, Redd admitted to being involved in the distribution of heroin. Redd was sentenced to twenty years in prison in September 2012.

=== Majestic towing scandal ===
In May 2012, Police Commissioner Frederick Bealefeld III directed a team (including agents from the FBI) that used wiretaps and other techniques to break up a major corruption scandal centered on the Majestic Auto Body shop. The shop paid BPD officers a fee when they called Majestic tow trucks to the scene of an accident. In all, 17 officers pleaded guilty to charges. At least another 37 officers were involved.

=== Lamin Manneh ===
In August 2013, Officer Lamin Manneh was indicted on charges he was acting as a pimp for his own wife and another woman. In November 2014, he was convicted of violation of the Mann Act.

=== James Walton Smith ===
In August 2013, while in custody awaiting trial for the murder of his girlfriend, Officer James Walton Smith killed himself.

=== Kendell Richburg ===
In October 2013, Officer Kendell Richburg was sentenced to eight years in prison on a number of charges. He pleaded guilty of conspiring with a local drug dealer. The officer would protect the dealer from arrest while he in turn provided information on his customers allowing Richburg to easily arrest them.

=== Christopher Robinson ===
In October 2013, Officer Christopher Robinson shot and killed his ex-girlfriend and her new partner before killing himself.

=== Ashley Roane ===
In November 2013, Officer Ashley Roane pleaded guilty to charges related to a scheme to sell Social Security numbers. She admitted to having used official computers to access personal information which she then passed on to others who used the information to defraud the government. She also admitted to knowingly protecting persons who transported large amounts of heroin in the city. In February 2014, she was sentenced to five years in prison.

=== Arrest for video recording ===
In March 2014, the city of Baltimore agreed to pay $250,000 to a man arrested at the Preakness Stakes in 2010 for recording police officers with his mobile phone. The city admitted no misconduct and said it was unable to identify the officers who arrested Christopher Sharp, but agreed to pay to settle the matter.

=== Frederick Allen ===
In April 2014, Officer Frederick Allen pleaded guilty to two counts of a sexual abuse of a minor. The abuse started in 2005 when the girl was fifteen years old and working with the Police Athletic League. Allen was fired from the department.

=== Alec Eugene Taylor ===
In August 2014, Officer Alec Eugene Taylor pleaded guilty to felony animal cruelty. He had killed his girlfriend's puppy.

=== Michael Johansen ===
Four BPD officers responded to a burglary call on 28 December 2014, where Michael Johansen had broken into a store and was attempting to steal cigarettes. When Johansen was asked to show his hands, he allegedly put his hands towards his lower waist area, and two officers opened fire, striking him multiple times. Johansen collapsed to the floor, and then asked officers if he was shot with beanbag rounds. Officer Wesley Cagle responded with "No, a .40-caliber, you piece of shit," and then shot Johansen in the groin at close range. Johansen survived. On 19 August 2015, the first two officers who shot Johansen were justified by state prosecutors in the shooting, and Cagle was charged with attempted murder and assault. Cagle was released on $1 million bail, but was later fired, found guilty of first-degree assault and sentenced to 12 years in prison.

=== Freddie Gray ===
Freddie Gray, a 25-year-old African American man, was taken into custody on April 12, 2015, for the possession of a switchblade knife. While being transported, Gray experienced what was described by officers as a "medical emergency." Within an hour of his arrest, Gray fell into a coma and was taken to a trauma center, where it was determined that he had suffered from a spinal injury. According to his family, Gray's spine was "80% severed" at his neck, he had three fractured vertebrae, and his larynx was injured. At the autopsy, however, the spinal cord was said to be intact. A contusion and secondary, time-related changes of edema and necrosis were seen. The events that led to the injuries are unclear; Officer Garrett Miller claimed that Gray was arrested "without force or incident". Dissenting medical professionals place the timing of the injury to the time of arrest.

Despite extensive surgery in an attempt to save his life, Gray died on 19 April. Pending an investigation, six BPD officers were temporarily suspended with pay. Police Commissioner Anthony Batts reported that the officers "failed to get [Gray] medical attention in a timely manner multiple times", and did not buckle him in the van while he was being transported to the police station.

The death of Gray led to the 2015 Baltimore riots. A major protest in downtown Baltimore on 25 April turned violent, resulting in 34 arrests and the injuries of 15 police officers. Following Gray's funeral on April 27, the unrest intensified with the looting and burning of local businesses and a CVS Pharmacy, culminating with the deployment of the Maryland National Guard to Baltimore and declaration of a state of emergency by Governor Larry Hogan.

On May 1, the six officers were charged in Gray's death. One officer was charged with second degree murder, which carries a penalty of up to 30 years imprisonment, while the five others were charged with crimes ranging from involuntary manslaughter to illegal arrest. One of the officers' trials ended in mistrial. Three of the officers were found not guilty at trial and the remaining charges against the officers were dropped on July 27, 2016.

=== Shooting of Keith Davis Jr. ===
Baltimore police fired 44 rounds at Keith Davis Jr. on June 7, 2015, hitting with three, including one in the face. The police had been in hot pursuit of a robbery suspect, and Davis was nearby. Police said Davis was shooting a gun at them, while Davis said he did not have a gun. Davis called his girlfriend near the end of the shooting. According to her, he said the police were trying to kill him. Davis was charged with 15 counts, including the robbery and discharge of a firearm. The discharge of a firearm count was dropped after it was proven that all the shots came from the police. Davis was found not guilty of the robbery after the victim said in Court that Davis did not resemble the robber. Davis was found guilty of possession of the gun, which he says was planted. Davis was also charged with a murder in an earlier incident involving the same gun. The first three times Davis was tried for the murder resulted in two mistrials and one conviction that was later overturned. Marilyn Mosby's office tried him a fourth time for the murder, with the Baltimore court restricting access to courtroom audio, ordering that it not be broadcast to the public; the Undisclosed podcast broadcast the audio anyway, which it says is protected by the First Amendment. The fourth trial again reached a guilty verdict, and Davis was facing sentencing of up to 50 years. However, also this verdict was later overturned. A 5th murder trial was scheduled for May 2023, but Baltimore State's Attorney Ivan Bates ended the office's prosecution of Davis on January 3, 2023.

=== 2017 racketeering indictment ===
All eight members of the Gun Trace Task Force were accused in a federal racketeering indictment. The eight officers—Daniel Hersl, Evodio Hendrix, Jemell Rayam, Marcus Taylor, Maurice Ward, Momodu Gondo, Thomas Allers and Wayne Jenkins—were accused of shaking down citizens for money and pocketing it, lying to investigators, filing false court paperwork, and making fraudulent overtime claims. The amount stolen from citizens ranged from $200 to $200,000. The probe began when the Drug Enforcement Administration started looking into the officers while investigating a drug organization and later involved the FBI. The officers were summoned by internal affairs on the morning of Wednesday, March 1, 2017, and arrested. All eight officers were convicted, and received sentences ranging from 7 to 25 years. The indictment was portrayed on the HBO series We Own This City, which serves as David Simon's spiritual successor to The Wire, another show that follows Baltimore police officers.

=== Arrest of Detective Victor Rivera ===
In February 2021, Detective Victor Rivera was sentenced to fourteen months in confinement. Working with two other policemen, Rivera stole three kilograms of cocaine and used a police informant to sell the contraband. Sergeant Keith Gladstone pleaded guilty to a related charge.

=== Eric Banks ===
In July 2021, an off-duty BPD police officer, Eric Banks, was arrested for murder and for trying to disarm another officer who was at his residence in neighboring Anne Arundel County. The police were investigating Banks' teenaged step-son's disappearance and went to his home to rule out the possibility the step-son might have been hiding inside the house. Banks originally tried to block officers from entering and checking the attic space however when they accessed it, they found his step-son's body. Banks subsequently began wrestling with officers for their firearms and was arrested. According to charging documents, Banks admitted to hiding the body in the attic space, but did not provide a specific reason why he did so. According to Maryland Public Court Records, Banks took an Alford Plea in October 2022. In January 2023, Banks was sentenced to 42 years in prison for the murder and for attempting to disarm the arresting officers at the scene.

== In popular culture ==
- The BPD was portrayed in the NBC television series Homicide: Life on the Street produced by David Simon, a former The Baltimore Sun reporter. The show ran for seven seasons and spawned a TV movie titled Homicide: The Movie. The series was based on the Simon book Homicide: A Year on the Killing Streets, expanded from his crime news stories in The Baltimore Sun. At times, there has also been crossover in stories and characters from Law & Order and Homicide: Life on the Street.
- The HBO original series The Wire (also produced and created by David Simon) features the department extensively, portraying it as a dysfunctional organization whose effectiveness is often impaired by personal vendettas and office politics.
- Of Dolls and Murder, a documentary film, follows members of the Baltimore Police's Homicide Unit as they try and solve cold cases. It also looks at the Nutshell Studies of Unexplained Death, a series of tiny crime scene dioramas that the Baltimore police famously use for training in forensics. These training dioramas provided inspiration for The Miniature Killer, a recurring character in the television series CSI: Crime Scene Investigation.
- The 2018 documentary film Charm City follows the BPD and others on the frontline during three years of unparalleled violence in the city.
- Episode 106 of Rescue 911 featured a ride-along with Baltimore police officer John Smith and respond to a shooting/murder at a restaurant called "The Yellow Bowl".

=== Controversy ===
The portrayals of Baltimore City in The Wire and Homicide: Life on the Street have received criticism from several notable Baltimore politicians, such as former mayor and former Maryland governor Martin O'Malley and former mayor Sheila Dixon. Both politicians have argued that the shows glorify the levels of violence within the city and give Baltimore a negative image. In contrast, the police department has been relatively supportive of the shows, stating that crime within the city has been accurately portrayed. Several current and former members of the police force have served as technical advisors for the Baltimore-based shows and some, such as former Major Gary D'Addario, have allegedly been either dismissed or forced to retire from the department for assisting the shows' producers and directors.

== See also ==
- Crime in Baltimore
- List of law enforcement agencies in Maryland
