= List of Jon Bernthal performances =

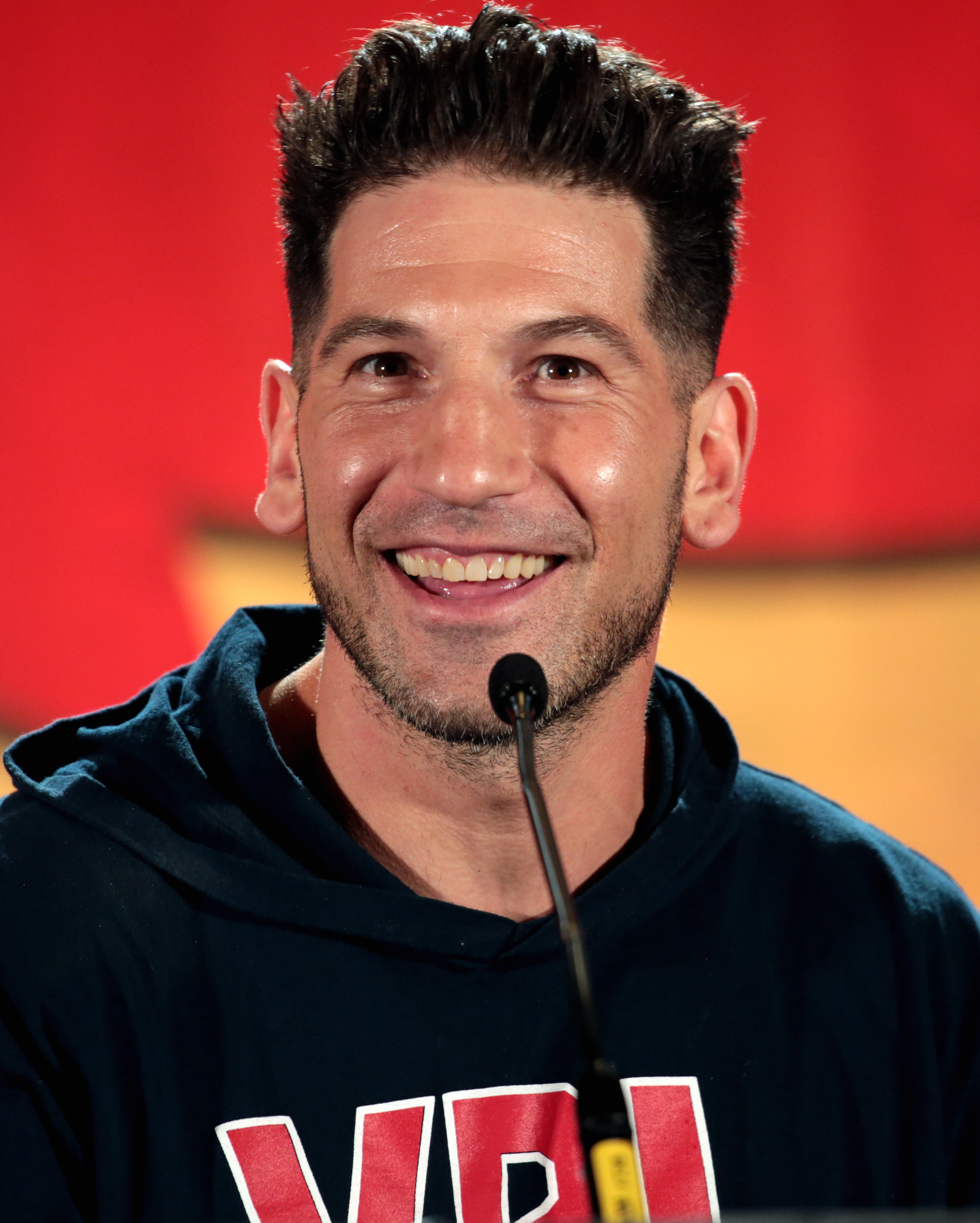
Bernthal at the Phoenix Comicon in May 2017

Jon Bernthal is an American actor. The following are his roles on stage and screen. He made his television debut in a minor role in the NBC crime series Law & Order: Criminal Intent in 2002 and film debut in the independent drama Mary/Mary in 2002. He gained internal prominence for his performance as Frank Castle / The Punisher in the Marvel Cinematic Universe superhero series Daredevil (2016), The Punisher (2017–2019), and Daredevil: Born Again (2025), the television special The Punisher: One Last Kill (2026), and the film Spider-Man: Brand New Day (2026).

Bernthal's early roles include supporting parts such as a police officer during 9/11 in the Oliver Stone drama World Trade Center (2006), Al Capone in the family comedy Night at the Museum: Battle of the Smithsonian (2009), a ghostwriter's agent in the Roman Polanski neo-noir thriller The Ghost Writer (2010), a drug dealer in the Martin Scorsese crime drama The Wolf of Wall Street (2013), a tank loader in the David Ayer war film Fury (2014), a police officer in the Denis Villeneuve crime thriller Sicario (2015), and a thug in the Edgar Wright action crime film Baby Driver (2017). He took more prominent roles in The Accountant (2016) and its 2025 sequel, Lee Iacocca in the sports drama Ford v. Ferrari (2019), Rick Macci in the sports drama King Richard (2021), Johnny Soprano in the mob movie The Many Saints of Newark (2021), the husband of Isabel Wilkerson in the racial drama Origin (2023), and Menelaus in Christopher Nolan’s epic fantasy action film The Odyssey (2026). He also took roles in the John Pollono's crime drama Small Engine Repair (2021) and the Lena Dunham directed Sharp Stick (2022), which he served as a producer and executive producer respectively.

On television, one of his most well known starring roles is Shane Walsh in the AMC horror series The Walking Dead which he portrayed as a series regular from 2010 to 2012. He has also taken on roles in the CBS sitcom The Class (2006–2007), the HBO World War II drama miniseries The Pacific (2010), the TNT miniseries Mob City (2013), the HBO miniseries Show Me a Hero (2015), and We Own This City (2022), and the Netflix miniseries His & Hers (2026). For his recurring guest role as drug addict Michael Berzatto in the FX on Hulu series The Bear (2022–2026), he won the Primetime Emmy Award for Outstanding Guest Actor in a Comedy Series.

== Acting credits ==
=== Film ===
Year	Title	Role	Notes	Refs.
2002	Mary/Mary	Manny		
2004	Tony n' Tina's Wedding	Dominic Fabrizzi		
2004	Revenge of the Middle-Aged Woman	Man in Office		
2006	World Trade Center	Christopher Amoroso		
2007	The Air I Breathe	Interviewer		
2007	Day Zero	James Dixon		
2008	Bar Starz	Donnie Pintron		
2008	A Line in the Sand	Banzai		
2009	Night at the Museum: Battle of the Smithsonian	Al Capone		
2010	The Ghost Writer	Rick Ricardelli		
2010	Date Night	Young Man		
2011	Rampart	Dan Morone		
2013	Snitch	Daniel James		
2013	Grudge Match	B.J. Rose		
2013	The Wolf of Wall Street	Brad Bodnick		
2014	Fury	Pfc. Grady "Coon-Ass" Travis		
2015	Me and Earl and the Dying Girl	Mr. McCarthy		
2015	Sicario	Ted		
2015	We Are Your Friends	Paige Morrell		
2016	Justice League vs. Teen Titans	Trigon	Voice; direct-to-DVD	
2016	The Accountant	Braxton Wolff		
2016	The Escape	Holt	Short film	
2017	Wind River	Matt Rayburn		
2017	Baby Driver	Griff		
2017	Sweet Virginia	Sam		
2017	Pilgrimage	The Mute		
2017	Shot Caller	Frank "Shotgun"		
2018	Widows	Florek Gunner		
2019	The Peanut Butter Falcon	Mark		
2019	Ford v Ferrari	Lee Iacocca		
2020	Viena and the Fantomes	Monroe		
2021	Those Who Wish Me Dead	Sheriff Ethan Sawyer		
2021	King Richard	Rick Macci		
2021	Small Engine Repair	Terrance Swaino	Also producer	
2021	The Many Saints of Newark	Johnny Soprano		
2021	The Unforgivable	Blake		
2022	Sharp Stick	Josh	Also executive producer	
2023	Origin	Brett Hamilton		
2025	The Accountant 2	Braxton Wolff		
2025	The Amateur	Jackson O'Brien / The Bear		
2026	The Odyssey	King Menelaus of Sparta		
2026	Spider-Man: Brand New Day	Frank Castle / The Punisher		

=== Television ===
Year	Title	Role	Notes	Refs.
2002	Law & Order: Criminal Intent	Lane Ruddock	Episode: "Malignant"	
2004	Without a Trace	Alex Genya	Episode: "Bait"	
2004	Dr. Vegas	Greg	Episode: "Dead Man, Live Bet"	
2004	Boston Legal	Michael Shea	Episode: "Questionable Characters"	
2005	Jonny Zero	Brett Parish	Episode: "I Did It All for the Nooky"	
2005	CSI: Miami	Harry Klugman	2 episodes	
2005	Law & Order: Special Victims Unit	Sherm Hempell	Episode: "Goliath"	
2005	How I Met Your Mother	Carlos	Episode: "Purple Giraffe"	
2006–2007	The Class	Duncan Carmello	Main role (19 episodes)	
2009–2010	Eastwick	Raymond Gardener	Main role (12 episodes)	
2010	Numb3rs	Mike Nash	Episode: "Growin' Up"	
2010	The Pacific	Sgt. Manuel Rodriguez	2 episodes	
2010–2012; 2018; 2022	The Walking Dead	Shane Walsh	21 episodes Main role (seasons 1–2) Guest (seasons 3 & 9)	
2012	Harry's Law	Lucas Trassino	Episode: "The Whole Truth"	
2012; 2017	Robot Chicken	Hawkeye / Mayor of Des Moines / Shane Walsh	Voice (2 episodes)	
2013	Mob City	Detective Joe Teague	Main role (6 episodes)	
2015	Show Me a Hero	Michael H. Sussman	Recurring role (4 episodes)	
2015; 2018	SuperMansion	Rat-A-Pult	Voice (4 episodes)	
2016	Daredevil	Frank Castle / The Punisher	Main role; 12 episodes (season 2)	
2017–2019	The Punisher	Frank Castle / The Punisher	Main role (26 episodes)	
2018–2019	Unbreakable Kimmy Schmidt	Ilan	2 episodes	
2021	The Premise	Chase Milbrandt	Episode: "Moment of Silence"	
2022	We Own This City	Wayne Jenkins	Main role (6 episodes)	
2022	American Gigolo	Julian Kaye	Main role (8 episodes)	
2022–2026	The Bear	Michael "Mikey" Berzatto	9 episodes; also wrote episode: "Gary"	
2025	Daredevil: Born Again	Frank Castle / The Punisher	Main role; 2 episodes (season 1)	
2026	His & Hers	Detective Jack Harper	Main role (6 episodes)	
2026	The Punisher: One Last Kill	Frank Castle / The Punisher	Disney+ special; also writer and executive producer	

=== Theater ===
Year	Title	Role	Playwright	Venue	Refs.
1994	Scenes From The New World	Boots/ Waiter	Eric Bogosian	Studio 1019	
1999	Cher Molière	Molière	Philip Moeller	Institute for Advanced Theater Training	
2000	Man of La Mancha	Sancho Panza	Dale Wasserman	Moscow Art Theatre	
2000	Spring Awakening	Moritz Steifel	Frank Wedekind	Moscow Art Theatre	
2001	Othello	Lodovico u/s Iago	William Shakespeare	American Repertory Theater	
2002	Marat/Sade	Inmate	Peter Weiss	American Repertory Theater	
2002	This Is Our Youth	Dennis	Kenneth Lonergan	Studio Theatre, Washington D.C.	
2002	The Resistible Rise of Arturo Ui	Arturo Ui	Bertolt Brecht	Ontological-Hysteric Theater	
2003	Fifth of July	u/s Kenneth Talley, Jr. u/s Weston Hurley u/s John Landis	Lanford Wilson	Signature Theatre, Off-Broadway	
2003	Proof	Hal	David Auburn	Portland Stage Company	
2007	Fat Pig	Carter (replacement)	Neil LaBute	Geffen Playhouse, Los Angeles	
2011	Small Engine Repair	Terrance Swaino	John Pollono	Theatre Theater / Rogue Machine Theatre	
2025	Ironbound	Tommy	Martyna Majok	Chaparral Auditorium, Ojai	
2026	Dog Day Afternoon	Sonny Amato	Stephen Adly Guirgis	Broadway debut; August Wilson Theatre	

== Video games ==
Year	Title	Voice role	Notes	Refs.
2003	Manhunt	Cerberus	Motion capture performance only	
2014	Call of Duty: Advanced Warfare	Corporal Jim Decker	Playable character in the downloadable game mode "Exo Zombies"	
2017	Tom Clancy's Ghost Recon Wildlands	Cole D. Walker	Also motion capture performance for downloadable content (DLC)	
2019	Tom Clancy's Ghost Recon Breakpoint	Cole D. Walker	Also motion capture performance	
2026	Fortnite	Frank Castle / The Punisher	Likeness	
