= Jon Bernthal =

American actor (born 1976)

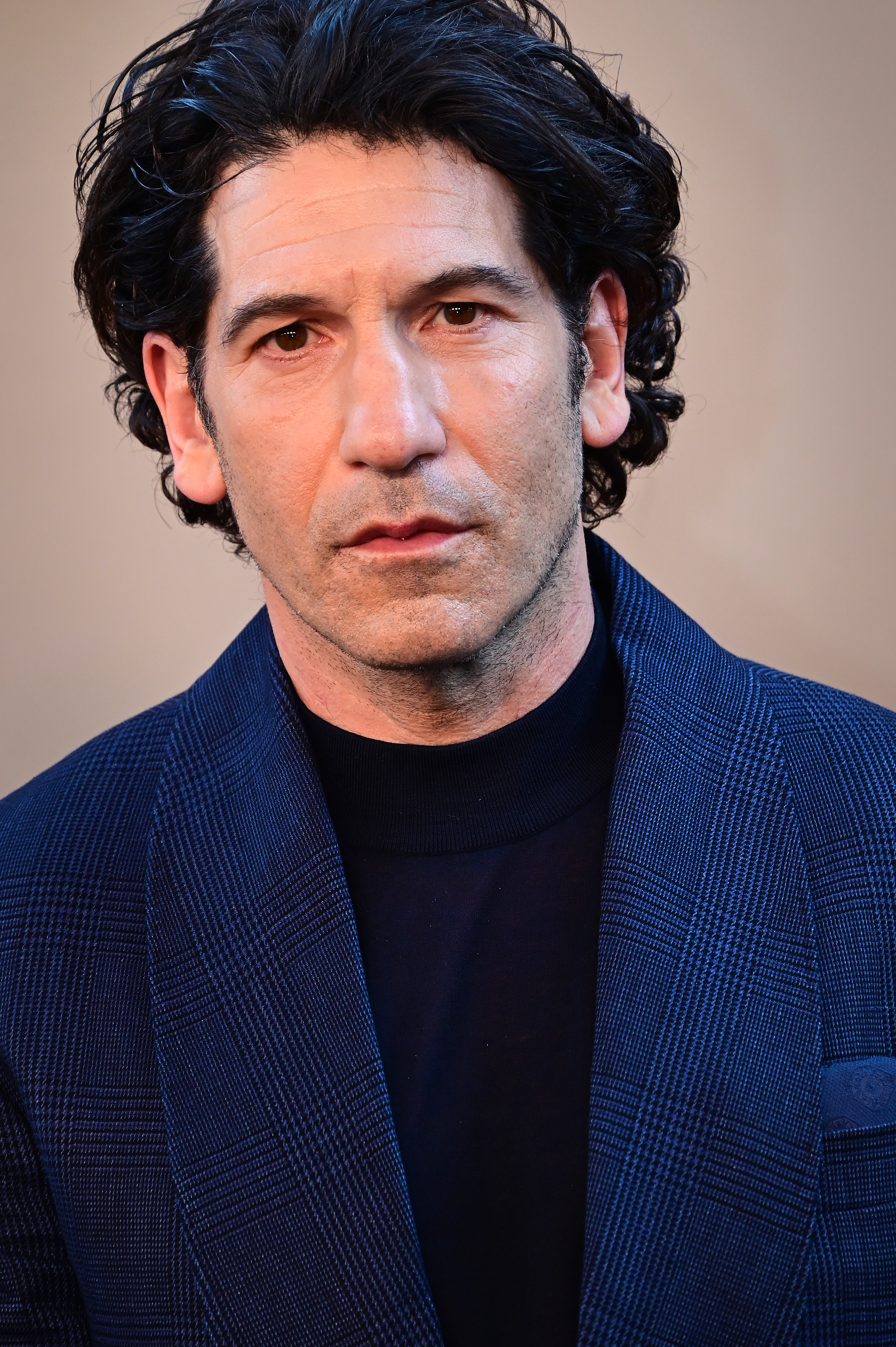
- Bernthal in 2026
- Born: Jonathan Edward Bernthal; September 20, 1976 (age 50); Washington, D.C., U.S.
- Other name: Jon Jon
- Education: Skidmore College (attended); Harvard University (GrDip)
- Occupation: Actor
- Years active: 1994–present
- Works: Full list
- Spouse: Erin Angle (m. 2010)
- Children: 3
- Relatives: Thomas Bernthal (brother); Murray Bernthal (grandfather); Adam Schlesinger (cousin); Sheryl Sandberg (sister-in-law); Kurt Angle (uncle-in-law)

Jonathan Edward Bernthal (/ˈbɜːrnθɔːl/; born September 20, 1976) is an American actor. Known for playing brash, hard-edged, ethically complex characters, he first achieved prominence for his portrayal of Shane Walsh on the AMC horror drama series The Walking Dead (2010–2012; 2018). He went on to portray Frank Castle / The Punisher in Marvel Cinematic Universe (MCU) media beginning with the second season of Daredevil (2016), before starring in his own spin-off series The Punisher (2017–2019). He later starred in the first season of the revival series Daredevil: Born Again (2025), the Disney+ television special The Punisher: One Last Kill (2026) which he co-wrote, and the film Spider-Man: Brand New Day (2026).

Bernthal has starred in multiple films including World Trade Center (2006), Day Zero (2007), Night at the Museum: Battle of the Smithsonian (2009), The Ghost Writer (2010), The Wolf of Wall Street (2013), Fury (2014), Sicario (2015), The Accountant (2016), Baby Driver (2017), Ford v Ferrari (2019), King Richard (2021), Origin (2023), The Accountant 2 (2025), and The Odyssey (2026). He has also had prominent roles in several television series including the HBO miniseries We Own This City (2022) as Wayne Jenkins and Hulu's The Bear (2022–2026) as Michael Berzatto, the latter winning him a Primetime Emmy Award.

He made his Broadway debut from March to July 2026 starring in Dog Day Afternoon.

== Early life and education ==
Jonathan Edward Bernthal was born in Washington, D.C. on September 20, 1976, to a Jewish family. He is a son of Joan Lurie (née Marx) and Eric Lawrence "Rick" Bernthal, a former lawyer with Latham & Watkins LLP and chair of the board of directors for The Humane Society of the United States until 2019. His paternal grandfather was musician and producer Murray Bernthal. He has two brothers: Nicholas, an orthopedic surgeon and professor at University of California, Los Angeles (UCLA), and Thomas, a consulting agency CEO who is married to former Facebook COO Sheryl Sandberg. The three are cousins of rock musician Adam Schlesinger, who died in April 2020.

Jon Bernthal grew up in Cabin John, Maryland. He attended the Sidwell Friends School in Washington D.C. graduating in 1995. He has often described his younger self as being a "troublemaker." After high school, he studied at Skidmore College in Saratoga Springs, New York, but dropped out. On the advice of his acting teacher, Alma Becker, he joined the Moscow Art Theatre School in Moscow. While there, he was a catcher for a Russian professional baseball team.

== Career ==
=== 2002–2008: Early career ===
Bernthal was discovered while at the Moscow Art Theatre by the executive director of Harvard University's Institute for Advanced Theater Training at the American Repertory Theater in Cambridge, Massachusetts; he studied there as a graduate-level certificate student and completed his studies in 2002. After graduating, he moved to New York City to pursue a career in theater. He mentioned not being a fully method actor. Since 2002, Bernthal has performed in over thirty plays regionally and off-Broadway, including many with his own theater company, the now defunct Fovea Floods. He also had small guest roles in multiple television series, such as Boston Legal, CSI: Miami and How I Met Your Mother (S01E02). He was cast in the 2004 movie of Tony 'n' Tina's Wedding. Bernthal moved to Los Angeles in 2006. He booked his first regular role on a television series with the CBS sitcom The Class; the show was canceled after one season. He had roles in films including Day Zero and World Trade Center.

=== 2009–2015: Breakthrough with The Walking Dead ===
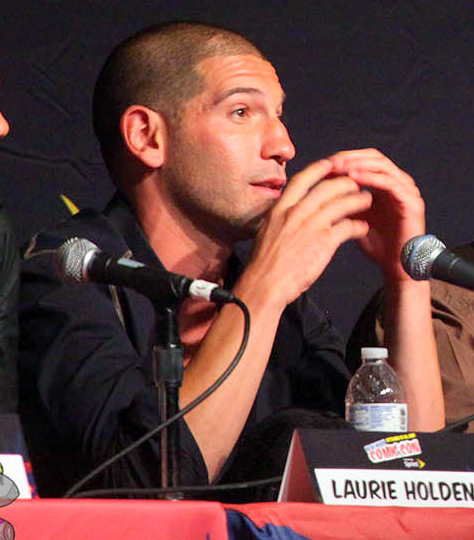
Bernthal at the 2011 New York ComicCon in Manhattan, New York

In 2009, Bernthal was a series regular on the ABC television series Eastwick, and starred alongside actress Jaime Ray Newman (his future co-star in The Punisher). Eastwick was canceled after one season. In 2010, Bernthal portrayed Sgt. Manuel Rodriguez on the HBO miniseries The Pacific. Bernthal found critical success portraying Shane Walsh in Frank Darabont's The Walking Dead, based on the comic book series of the same name. He was a regular on the show until 2012 and was nominated for the Breakout Performance – Male Award at the 2011 Scream Awards. Bernthal reunited with Darabont for the TNT series Mob City, in which he played LAPD Detective Joe Teague, a police officer working in a corrupt 1940s Los Angeles, which was cancelled after one season.

During this period, Bernthal had supporting roles in the 2009 fantasy film Night at the Museum: Battle of the Smithsonian as mobster Al Capone and Roman Polanski's thriller film The Ghost Writer. He also appeared in the 2011 Woody Harrelson feature Rampart. He guest starred in episodes of television shows such as Numbers and Harry's Law. In 2011, Bernthal performed in the premiere of the dark comedy play Small Engine Repair. The play was critically acclaimed; critics praised Bernthal's performance for his "energy and wit" and he was nominated for an Ovation Award. After its world premiere run Small Engine Repair was transferred Off-Broadway by MCC Theater with Bernthal signing on to reprise his role. However, filming commitments made Bernthal withdraw from the play and he was replaced by James Badge Dale.

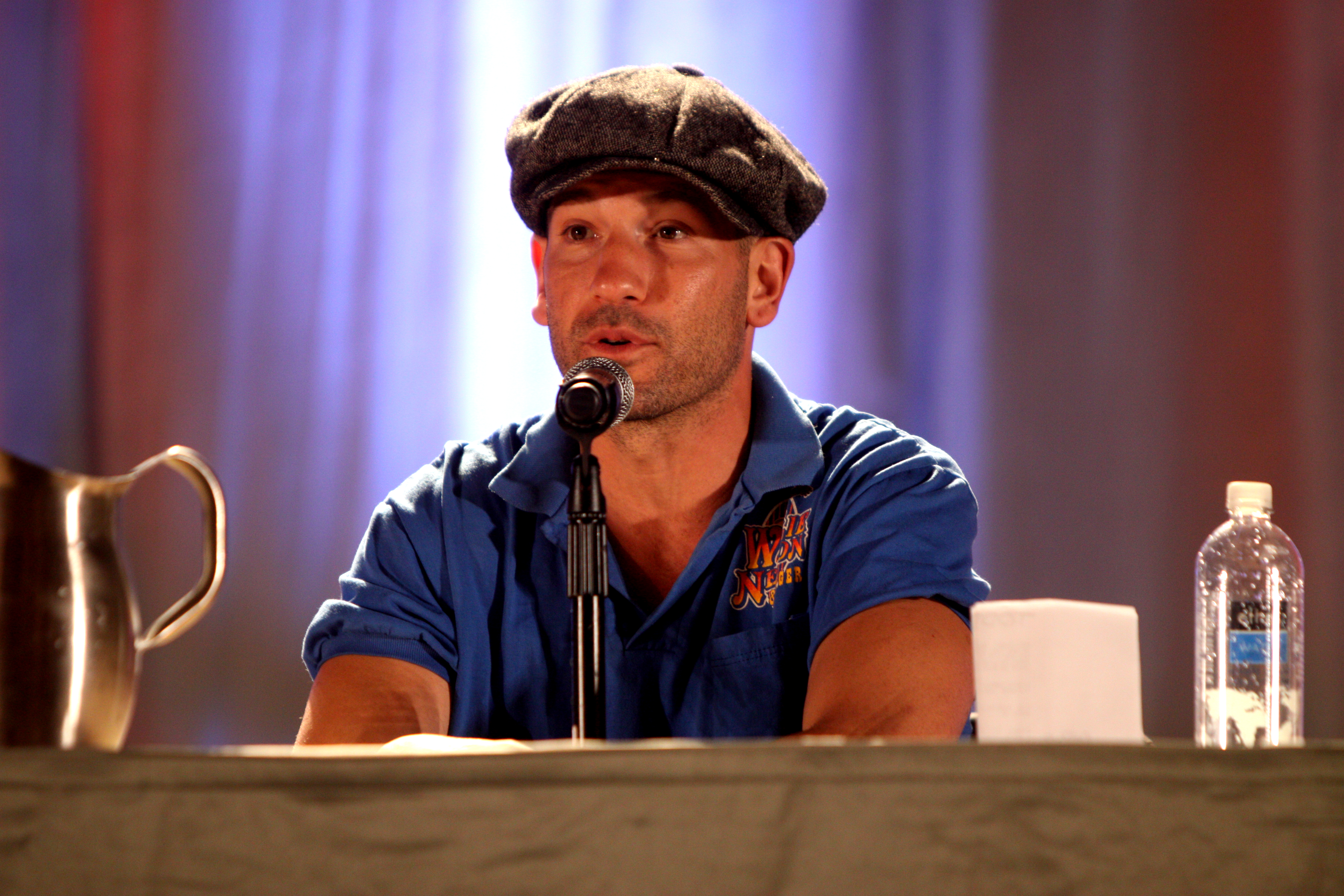
Bernthal at the 2012 Phoenix ComicCon in Phoenix

In 2013, Bernthal had supporting roles in the crime drama film Snitch, and the sports comedy film Grudge Match. Bernthal played Brad in the Martin Scorsese film The Wolf of Wall Street. He played southerner Grady "Coon-Ass" Travis in the 2014 World War II film Fury, with critics praising the cast of the film. In 2014, Bernthal took part in filming the movie Viena and the Fantomes, opposite Dakota Fanning and Evan Rachel Wood; the film was only released in 2020. Bernthal next appeared in Denis Villeneuve's 2015 action drama film Sicario, which won numerous awards and received positive reviews from critics. 2015 also saw Bernthal in supporting roles in Me and Earl and the Dying Girl, winner of the US Grand Jury Prize for drama at the 2015 Sundance Film Festival, and We Are Your Friends. During this time, Bernthal portrayed NAACP attorney Michael H. Sussman in the HBO miniseries Show Me a Hero. He also, alongside actor Viggo Mortensen, executive produced the play The Time of Our Lies – The Life and Times of Howard Zinn, directed by frequent theater collaborator Josh Chambers. The Time of Our Lies was performed through the month of August 2014 at the Edinburgh Fringe Festival.

=== 2015–2021: Stardom as The Punisher ===
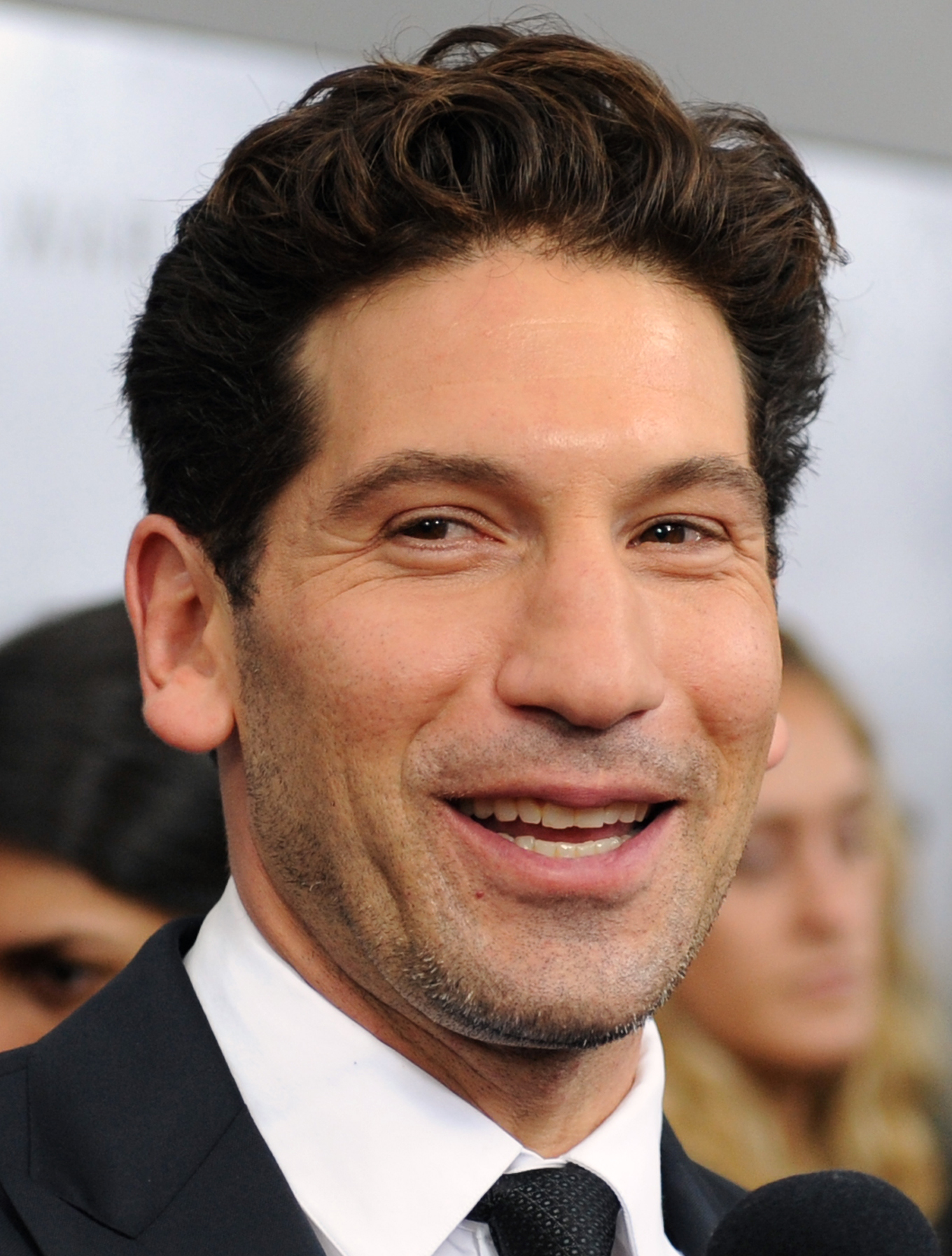
Bernthal at the premiere of Fury in Washington D.C., October 2014

In June 2015, Marvel announced that Bernthal would play Frank Castle / The Punisher in season two of Netflix's superhero series Daredevil, which was released on March 18, 2016. Although he initially hesitated to join a superhero franchise, Bernthal decided to take the role after admiring the performances of actors Charlie Cox (Matt Murdock / Daredevil) and Vincent D'Onofrio (Wilson Fisk / Kingpin) in the previous season of Daredevil. Critics commended Bernthal's performance as The Punisher, with IGN calling it "an absolutely stellar, gutting performance." Comic book writer and the Punisher's co-creator Gerry Conway called Bernthal's performance a favorite on-screen portrayal of the character and said, "Jon Bernthal gives The Punisher the kind of pathos that's underneath the tough guy and I really like that."

Despite not initially being ordered by Netflix, the network spun-off the character's self-titled series The Punisher, released on November 17, 2017. His portrayal of the title character in season one was commended as a "truly remarkable and intense performance" for its emotional depth and "possibly the best grizzly antihero performance among all of Marvel's Netflix series to date." Bernthal likes to perform his own stunts on the show. On December 12, 2017, it was announced that the show had been renewed for season two by Netflix, which was released on January 18, 2019. A month after the season aired, the show was canceled.

In 2016, Bernthal co-starred with Ben Affleck in the action-thriller The Accountant as Brax. That same year, he was interviewed for the documentary Can't Be Stopped about an American graffiti crew of the same name. In 2017, he co-starred in Taylor Sheridan's directorial debut film Wind River, which premiered at the 2017 Sundance Film Festival. He also appeared in significant roles in Edgar Wright's Baby Driver as Griff and prison drama Shot Caller. In the Irish action thriller film Pilgrimage, Bernthal played The Mute. Due to the actor's preference to stay in character on film sets, he chose not to speak to the cast or crew for the first few weeks of production. Bernthal was praised for his acting, with The Hollywood Reporter remarking that Bernthal "steals the film with his intense, nearly wordless performance... with his buff physicality and commanding presence filling the screen."

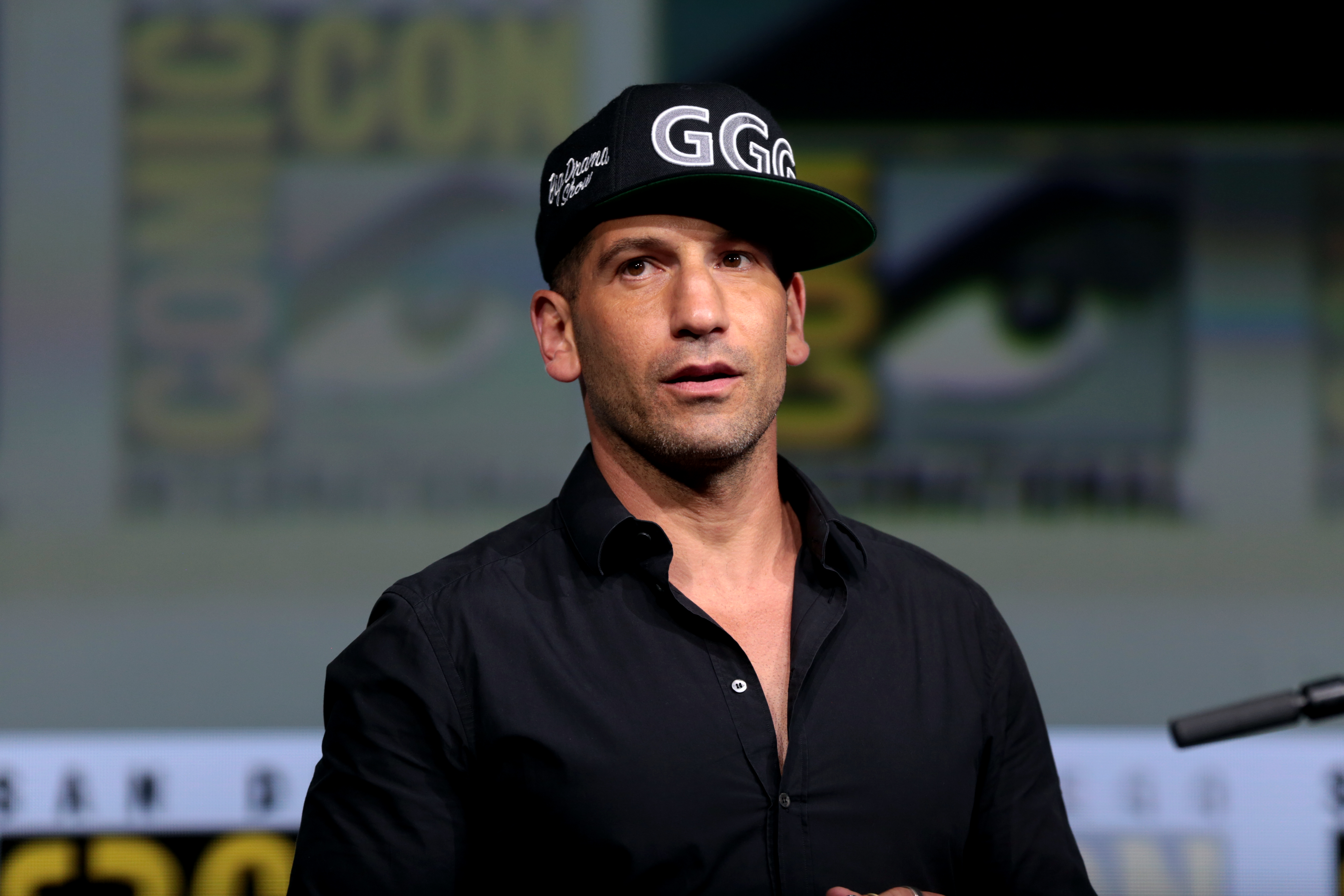
Bernthal at the 2017 San Diego ComicCon in San Diego, California

On November 17, 2017, the initial season of The Punisher and the film Sweet Virginia were both released. For Sweet Virginia, Bernthal played a gentle motel-owner with Parkinson's disease and critics praised his performance. During the press tours at this time Bernthal's interview on Jim Norton and Sam Roberts made news due to his description of Kevin Spacey (who had faced recent sexual assault charges) making him uncomfortable on the set of Baby Driver. Bernthal stated that he "lost all respect" for Spacey and that Spacey "was a bit of a bully." In the same month, Bernthal was offered a role in the 2018 biopic film First Man, but declined it due to his daughter's illness. In 2018, he appeared in Steve McQueen's heist thriller Widows, and reprised his role in The Walking Dead for the season 9 episode "What Comes After."

Bernthal played the brother of a fisherman (Shia LaBeouf) in the independent film The Peanut Butter Falcon. He played business magnate Lee Iacocca in a supporting role for James Mangold's action biographical drama Ford v Ferrari. Production began in the summer of 2018 and the film was released in November 2019. In summer 2019, Bernthal filmed Those Who Wish Me Dead, an action/thriller film directed by Taylor Sheridan. It was released in May 2021. In early 2019, Bernthal reprised his role in the film version of Small Engine Repair, a play in which he originated the role of Terrance Swaino in 2011. The film was released in September 2021. In January 2019, Bernthal joined the cast of The Many Saints of Newark, the prequel feature film of HBO's The Sopranos, which was released in October 2021. In the Netflix film The Unforgivable, Bernthal played the love interest of a murderous woman (Sandra Bullock). He has worked in the PC and console gaming world as a voice actor, and his appearance has been used for non-playable characters (NPCs). He appears in both Tom Clancy's Ghost Recon Wildlands and Tom Clancy's Ghost Recon Breakpoint as LT Cole D. Walker.

=== 2022–present: The Bear, return to Marvel, and Broadway debut ===
Bernthal starred as Baltimore Police Department Sergeant Wayne Jenkins in the HBO miniseries We Own This City (2022) to critical acclaim. Andy Greenwald of The Ringer said Bernthal gave "one of the great TV performances of this century". He also played the title character of the eight-episode series American Gigolo (2022) as Johnny and his gigolo alter ego "Julian".

He plays Mikey Berzatto in the Hulu hit series The Bear (2022–2026). He won a Primetime Emmy Award for Outstanding Guest Actor in a Comedy Series for his performance as Berzatto in the season two episode, "Fishes". He also received nominations for his performances in seasons one and three. In May 2026, FX released a surprise special episode, Gary, which appears on Hulu as its own title rather than as part of the catalog of The Bear. It stars Ebon Moss-Bachrach and Bernthal in their roles from The Bear. Bernthal and Moss-Bachrach also wrote the special.

On February 18, 2022, Real Ones with Jon Bernthal debuted, a podcast series developed by Bernthal that "gives the microphone to some of the most interesting, authentic people living on the front lines of the big issues of our time. From cops to gang members, soldiers and doctors, activists and first responders, you're going to hear from people who aren't pushing any agenda other than honest, open dialogue. What transpires is informative, funny, and at times heartbreaking – delivered by people you'll feel an immediate connection to."

In March 2023, it was confirmed that Bernthal would reprise his role as Frank Castle / The Punisher in the then-upcoming revival television series Daredevil: Born Again for Disney+. The show premiered on March 4, 2025, with Bernthal appearing in a few episodes. In 2026, Bernthal co-wrote, executive produced, and starred in a Marvel Studios Special Presentation for Disney+ titled The Punisher: One Last Kill (2026). It was released on May 12. Later that year, he reprised his role of Frank Castle in the film Spider-Man: Brand New Day (2026) opposite Tom Holland in the titular role.

Bernthal also starred in the American espionage thriller The Amateur (2025) and reprised his role of Braxton in the action thriller The Accountant 2 (2025). In January 2026, he starred as Detective Jack Harper opposite Tessa Thompson in the Netflix miniseries His & Hers.

He made his Broadway debut in the spring of 2026 opposite Ebon Moss-Bachrach in Stephen Adly Guirgis's stage adaptation of Dog Day Afternoon. In July, he starred in Christopher Nolan's epic fantasy action film The Odyssey (2026), an adaptation of the Odyssey, as King Menelaus of Sparta.

=== Upcoming projects ===
It was announced in October 2018 that Bernthal has a role in the dark comedy movie Snow Ponies, notably an entry on the 2006 Black List; since the original casting announcement, the film has remained in development. Cast in October 2016, Bernthal will star in the film Stingray opposite Joel Edgerton which has remained in development.

== Charity and activism ==
Bernthal and his brother Nicholas run the nonprofit organization Drops Fill Buckets, described as an "impact-driven, entrepreneurial approach to making a difference." Jon Bernthal is also an advocate of pit bull ownership and is a spokesperson for the Animal Farm Foundation, which rescues and promotes the equal treatment of pit bulls. He has three pit bulls of his own who often accompany him to set; two of them, Boss and Venice, made appearances in his 2012 film Rampart.

Bernthal was a signatory of "No Hostage Left Behind," a 2023 open letter espousing support for Israel in the Gaza war and asking US President Joe Biden to ensure the release of hostages kidnapped during the October 7 attacks. In 2023, he invited an IDF soldier on his podcast Real Ones to talk about the attacks.

== Personal life ==
Bernthal and Erin Angle married on September 25, 2010, in Potomac, Maryland. They have three children and the family lives in Ojai, California. Angle is the niece of WWE Hall of Famer Kurt Angle and his brother, amateur and professional wrestler Eric Angle.

Bernthal is a fan of the Washington Commanders. He revealed on the podcast Dinner's on Me with Jesse Tyler Ferguson that he has celiac disease.

Bernthal has a deep love of the Grateful Dead, stating in interviews that his favorite song is "Althea".

== Awards and nominations ==
Association	Year	Category	Project	Result	Ref.
Astra Awards	2023	Guest Actor in a Comedy Series	The Bear	Nominated	
Astra Awards	2024	Guest Actor in a Comedy Series	The Bear	Won	
Astra Awards	2025	Guest Actor in a Comedy Series	The Bear	Nominated	
Boston Society of Film Critics	2013	Best Ensemble Cast	The Wolf of Wall Street	Nominated	
Central Ohio Film Critics Association	2013	Best Ensemble	The Wolf of Wall Street	Nominated	
Critics' Choice Movie Award	2013	Best Acting Ensemble	The Wolf of Wall Street	Nominated	
Detroit Film Critics Society	2013	Best Ensemble	The Wolf of Wall Street	Nominated	
Detroit Film Critics Society	2021	Best Supporting Actor	King Richard	Won	
Drama League Award	2026	Distinguished Performance	Dog Day Afternoon	Nominated	
Garland Award	2012	Outstanding Acting Ensemble	Small Engine Repair	Won	
Georgia Film Critics Association	2013	Best Ensemble	The Wolf of Wall Street	Nominated	
Gold Derby Award	2013	Best Ensemble Cast	The Wolf of Wall Street	Nominated	
National Board of Review	2014	Best Cast	Fury	Won	
Ovation Awards	2011	Best Acting Ensemble in a Play	Small Engine Repair	Won	
Ovation Awards	2011	Best Lead Actor in a Play	Small Engine Repair	Nominated	
Primetime Emmy Award	2023	Outstanding Guest Actor in a Comedy Series	The Bear	Nominated	
Primetime Emmy Award	2024	Outstanding Guest Actor in a Comedy Series	The Bear	Won	
Primetime Emmy Award	2025	Outstanding Guest Actor in a Comedy Series	The Bear	Nominated	
Saturn Award	2018	Best Actor on Television	The Punisher	Nominated	
Saturn Award	2019	Best Actor in a Streaming Presentation	The Punisher	Nominated	
Scream Awards	2011	Breakout Performance – Male	The Walking Dead	Nominated	
Screen Actors Guild Awards	2022	Outstanding Cast in a Motion Picture	King Richard	Nominated	
Seattle Film Critics Award	2013	Best Ensemble Cast	The Wolf Of Wall Street	Nominated	
