= Lap Chi Chu =

Lighting designer

- Education: Northwestern University (BS); New York University (MFA)
- Occupation(s): Lighting Designer; Professor
- Years active: 1998-present
- Spouse: Rebecca Wisocky (m. 2015)
- Website: lapchichu.com

Lap Chi Chu is an American lighting designer known for his Broadway and Off-Broadway works.

== Early life and education ==
Chu got his B.S. from Northwestern University and M.F.A from New York University.

== Career ==
=== Teaching ===
Chu taught at California Institute of the Arts from 2001 to 2020. He is currently a professor and the Head of Lighting at the UCLA School of Theater, Film and Television. He also guest taught at Hangyang University in Seoul, South Korea.

== Personal life ==
Chu married Rebecca Wisocky in Boston on October 10, 2015.

== Awards and nominations ==
Chu has received a Tony Award nomination for Best Lighting Design of a Musical for the 2023 Broadway revival of "Camelot." Chu has also received a Drama Desk Award Nomination for Outstanding Lighting Design of a Musical in 2024 for Suffs. Chu's lighting for Mlima’s Tale earned him the Lucille Lortel Award for Best Lighting in 2019 and an Outer Critics Circle Award nomination in 2018. Also in 2018, he received an Obie for Sustained Excellence in Lighting Design and a Berkshire Theatre Critics Association Award for Outstanding Lighting Design for Dangerous House. In 2009, Chu was nominated for a Lucille Lortel Award for his lighting of The Good Negro.

== Work ==
=== Off Broadway ===
Year	Show	Theater
1998	Love's Fowl	New York Theatre Workshop
1998	Shopping and Fucking	New York Theatre Workshop
2009	Wildflower	McGinn-Cazale Theatre
2009	The Good Negro	Public Theater LuEsther Hall
2012	Emotional Creature	Pershing Square Signature Center The Romulus Linney Courtyard Theatre
2012	An Early History of Fire	Acorn Theatre
2013	Small Engine Repair	Lucille Lortel Theater
2013	stop. reset.	Pershing Square Signature Center The Romulus Linney Courtyard Theatre
2014	Father Comes Home from the Wars (Parts 1, 2 & 3)	Public Theater Anspacher Theater
2014	Appropriate	Pershing Square Signature Center
2014	Father Comes Home from the Wars (Parts 1, 2 & 3)	Public Theater Martinson Hall
2015	Lost Girls	Lucille Lortel Theater
2015	Mr. Wolf	South Coast Repertory
2016	The Wolves	The Duke on 42nd Street
2016	The Body of an American	Cherry Lane Theatre
2017	Describe the Night	Linda Gross Theater
2017	Oedipus El Ray	Public Theater Susan Stein Shiva Theater
2017	God Looked Away	Pasadena Community Playhouse
2017	At the Old Place	Old Globe Theater
2018	Our Very Own Carlin McCullough	Geffen Playhouse
2018	Mlima's Tale	Public Theater Martinson Hall
2018	An Ordinary Muslim	New York Theatre Workshop
2018	Eve's Song	Public Theater LuEsther Hall at Joseph Papp
2018	Mother of the Maid	Public Theater Anspacher Theater
2019	the way she spoke	Minetta Lane Theatre
2020	Darling Grenadine	Harold and Miriam Steinberg Center for Theatre
2023	The Coast Starlight	Lincoln Center Theater

=== Broadway ===
Year	Show	Theater	Notes
2023	Camelot	Lincoln Center Theater	Tony Nomination for Best Lighting Design of a Musical 2023
2024	Uncle Vanya	Lincoln Center Theater	
2024	Suffs	Music Box Theatre	Drama Desk Award Nomination for Outstanding Lighting Design of a Musical 2024

== See also ==
- Chinese people in New York City
