= Harsh Nayyar =

Indian actor

Harsh Nayyar (born in New Delhi, India) is an Indian actor.

== Theatre ==
As a student, in April, 1973, Harsh Nayyar starred as Dracula in a Thompson Theatre production in Raleigh, NC.

Nayyar continued to play in various theatre productions. For example, on Broadway, opening March 28, 1979, he was part of the original cast of A Meeting by the River by Christopher Isherwood and Don Bachardy at Palace Theatre, New York as a photographer. Opening February 27, 2018, off-Broadway, he played a representative of the local Muslim community in An Ordinary Muslim by Hammaad Chaudry at New York Theatre Workshop.

In 2002, Nayyar played an Esperanto poet ("eloquently sorrowful"), guiding the main character Priscilla through Kabul in Tony Kushner's drama Journey of a Lifetime, set to run for two months in Berkeley Repertory Theatre. In 2004, he portrayed Mr. Begg "with palpable anger and sorrow" in Victoria Brittain and Gillian Slovo's play Guantanamo: Honor Bound to Defend Freedom at the Culture Project, New York City, at the Studio Theatre (Washington D.C.) and at the Brava Theatre Center (San Francisco CA). Richard Connema noted a "touching performance" of the "heartfelt and poignant story" of Mr. Begg.

== Film and television ==
Nayyar became known as a movie actor with his role in Gandhi (1982) when he played Nathuram Godse, the assassin of Mahatma Gandhi. His subsequent roles included the comedies Easy Money (1983) and Desperately Seeking Susan.

In the second season of Tales from the Darkside (1986/87), Nayyar starred as Edmund Alcott, a vampire, in the episode The Unhappy Medium. In Men in Black, he played the news vendor. Other notable roles include project manager Dr. Ramdas in the comedy Making Mr. Right (1987) and Dr. Aamir Taraki in The Peacemaker (1997), who disassembles the stolen warheards. Among others, Nayyar has also acted in Hidalgo (2004).

Nayyar played Vishant in the pilot and another 2019 episode of the American comedy television series The Other Two and returned in 2023 (S3E09). In the Indian series Cyber Vaar – Har Screen Crime Scene (2022) for the streaming platform Voot, Nayyar played in the first episode. He appeared as Indian Prime Minister Kapur in Captain America: Brave New World (2025).

== Other publications ==
Harsh Nayyar also lent his voice to audio books. He narrated Between the Assassinations by Aravind Adiga.

== Filmography ==
=== Film ===
- Gandhi (1982) as Nathuram Godse
- Desperately Seeking Susan (1985) as Egyptian Diplomat
- Making Mr. Right (1987) as Dr. Ramdas
- The Preacher's Wife (1996) as Christmas Tree Man
- The First Wives Club (1996) as Mohammed
- The Devil's Advocate (1997) as Parvathi Resh
- Men in Black (1997) as News Vendor
- The Peacemaker (1997) as Dr. Aamir Taraki
- 28 Days (2000) as Newsstand Vendor
- The Other Two (2019, 2023) as Vishant
- Captain America: Brave New World (2025) as Indian Prime Minister Kapur

=== Television ===
Harsh Nayyar television credits
Year	Title	Role	Notes
1986–1987	Tales from the Darkside	Edmund Alcott / Rum	2 episodes
1988	The Equalizer	Medical Examiner	Episode: "Sea of Fire"
1989	The Equalizer	Medical Examiner	Episode: "The Visitation"
1993	Law & Order	Dr. R.V. Singh	Episode: "Volunteers"
1996	Law & Order	Gas Station Attendant	Episode: "Causa Mortis"
2006	Boston Legal	Dr. Barati Waibi	Episode: "Squid Pro Quo"
2022	Cyber Vaar – Har Screen Crime Scene		Web series
2018	Madam Secretary	Arnay Vijay	1 episode
2019–2023	The Other Two	Vishant	3 episodes

== Trivia ==
- According to his own information, Nayyar was introduced to the President of the United States Dwight D. Eisenhower and Dr. Martin Luther King in India in 1959.

== Literature ==
- Chhibber, Ranjan (1999). "Passage to Hollywood: Visions of India in the American film". ProQuest (Ph.D. thesis). State University of New York at Buffalo.
