= Bloomington Playwrights Project =

Theatre not-for-profit

- Origin: Bloomington, Indiana, U.S.
- Years active: 1980–2022
- Website: NewPlays.org; Current Staff: Chad Rabinovitz - Producing Artistic Director; Jessica Reed - Managing Director; Susan Jones - Literary Manager; David Sheehan - Associate Artistic Director Current Board President- David Chadwick

The Bloomington Playwrights Project (BPP) was a not-for-profit arts organization in Bloomington, Indiana. The BPP's mission states that it is "dedicated to the furthering of new original plays and theatre." The BPP only produces original work. It also holds playwriting contests and offers programs and classes in playwriting and acting.

== History ==
Tom Moseman and Jim Leonard founded the BPP in 1979, seeking to create a venue for local playwrights that would serve as an alternative to Indiana University. The first productions, including Leonard's And They Dance Real Slow in Jackson and Greg Owens' Queen of Bakersfield, were done on a tight budget and fast-paced schedule. Eventually, the BPP established itself as the only theater in Indiana—and one of the few theaters in the entire country—dedicated to producing only new plays.

In 1993, BPP benefactor Reva Shiner helped establish an annual new play competition, the Reva Shiner Full Length Play Contest, which brought submissions of scripts from all around the country, including work from both established and up-and-coming playwrights. In its first year of existence the contest, which awards the winner both a cash prize and a full production, was won by Glenn Alterman and his play Nobody’s Flood. Subsequent winners include Between Men and Cattle by Richard Kalinoski; Sister Calling My Name by Buzz McLaughlin; Medea With Child by Janet Burroway; Alice in Ireland by Judy Sheehan; The Return of Morality by Jamie Pachino; Outrage by Itamar Moses; and Maleficia by Suzanne Wingrove. Many of these plays have gone on to win additional awards and high-profile productions. In 2010, a new competition for dramatic plays was established. The Woodward/Newman Drama Award is an exclusive honor offered by Bloomington Playwrights Project, sponsored by Newman's Own Foundation, remembering the many great dramas Joanne Woodward and Paul Newman performed in together. The winner is awarded a prize of $3,000 and a full production as part of the BPP's Mainstage season.

Other playwrights who have had work produced at the BPP include Israel Horovitz, Wendy MacLeod, Craig Wright, Toni Press-Coffman, Michael Healey, Sheila Callaghan, Don Zolidis, Jim Henry, Arlene Hutton, OyamO, Trista Baldwin, Eric Pfeffinger, Susan Lieberman, Marsha Estell, Janet Allard, Henry Murray, and Suzanne Bradbeer.

The BPP began performing in a simple black box space, but now has two theater spaces: the Timothy J. Wiles mainstage and the Lora Shiner Studio. It produces a full subscription season, and at various times in its recent history has also hosted a drama school, a children's play festival, resident improv and sketch comedy troupes, an edgy late-night theater series, and cutting-edge cabaret. In 2006 a substantial grant from the National Endowment for the Arts subsidized a festival of plays by Latino and Latina writers.

In 2022, the BPP merged with Cardinal Stage and Pigasus Institute to form Constellation Stage and Screen, an arts organization producing theatre and film as well as educational programming.
