= Rogue Machine Theatre =

Rogue Machine Theatre (RMT) is a Los Angeles based theatre company dedicated to the production of new plays and plays new to Los Angeles. They currently run a seven- to eight-month season at The Matrix Theatre in West Hollywood. The founding Artistic Director is John Perrin Flynn. Since its foundation in 2008, RMT has won multiple awards, including an Ovation Award for excellence in theatre, LA Weekly Theater Awards and Back Stage Garland Awards. In 2008, Terry Morgan at Variety (magazine) described RMT as "one of the most ambitious and accomplished theatre companies in LA".

== Programming ==
Rogue Machine Theatre's season typically includes five to six full productions in the two theatre spaces at 7657 Melrose Ave. Plays run in repertory, two at a time, with alternating matinee and evening performances on the weekend and an additional Monday night performance for one of the shows. RMT also hosts a typically sold-out venue called Rant And Rave on the third Monday of the month in which seven writers are given ten minutes to speak on a previously designated topic. Additional yearly programming includes, Shorts and Sweets, an evening of short plays accompanied by home-baked desserts, Around-The-Clock, an evening of short plays conceived, written, directed and produced in a single twenty-four-hour period, and The Late Night Series, a venue for edgier, riskier, more controversial work.

== History ==
In 2008, Rogue Machine Theatre was formed as a not-for-profit and presented its first season, including Jeffrey Hatcher’s Compleat Female Stage Beauty, John Pollono’s Razorback and Brett Neveu’s American Dead.

Season Two (2009) included Adam Rapp’s Bingo With The Indians, Henry Murray’s Treefall, Stop Kiss by Diana Son, Half Of Plenty by Lisa Dillman and Phyllis Nagy’s Never Land.

In 2010, Season Three included Four Places by Joel Drake Johnson, The Sunset Limited by Cormac McCarthy, Yard Sale Signs by Jennie Webb, Steven Slater’s New York Animals and Milk Milk Lemonade by Joshua Conkel.

Season Four (2011) featured Small Engine Repair by John Pollono, Blackbird by David Harrower, The Word Begins by Sekou Andrews and Steve Connell, Vivien by Rick Foster and Monkey Adored by Henry Murray (playwright).

In 2012, Rogue Machine presented including Where the Great Ones Run by Mark Roberts, New Electric Ballroom by Enda Walsh, A Bright New Boise by Sam Hunter, and Three Views of the Same Object by Henry Murray, winner of the 2011–12 Woodward Newman Award and the Holland New Voices Award.

Rogue Machine's sixth season opened with Christopher Shinn's "Dying City", directed by Michael Peretzian, playing until the end of June. Opening June 8, 2013 was Kemp Powers's debut play, "One Night in Miami", directed by Carl Cofield which subsequently went on to have its European premiere at the Donmar Warehouse in London's westend 6 October to 3 December 2016. "Lost Girls" by John Pollono and "Falling" by Deanna Jent followed.

== Awards and accolades ==
Rogue Machine was awarded the American Theatre Wing's National Theatre Company Grant in 2014.

- Compleat Female Stage Beauty (2008): Back Stage Garland Award.
- American Dead (2008): Back Stage Garland Award
- Treefall (2009): 3 LA Weekly Theater Awards, Backstage Garland Award, Backstage Critic's Pick, LA Weekly Go, publication by Dramatists Play Service, LA Weekly's Ten Best Plays of 2009.
- Four Places (2010): Back Stage Garland Awards, 5 awards, L.A. Drama Critics Circle Award, 2 awards: LA Stage Ovation Awards, LA Weekly “GO!”, Backstage Critic's Pick.
- The Sunset Limited (2010): LA Times Critics Choice, LA Weekly GO, Backstage Critics Pick, Huffington Post: Top LA Theatre Productions.
- Small Engine Repair (2011): LA Stage Alliance Ovation Award, Backstage Garland Awards, Los Angeles Drama Critics Circle, LA Weekly Awards, LA Times “Critics Choice”, LA Weekly “GO”, Ovation Recommended, Top 10 LA Theatre experiences.
- Blackbird (2011): Los Angeles Drama Critics Circle, LA Weekly Theatre Awards, Backstage Garland Awards, LA Times “Critics Choice”, LA Weekly “GO”, Ovation recommended, Top Ten Theatre Experiences of 2011, Best of 2011 in Theatre, Top Los Angeles Theatre Productions 2011, Highlights of 2011 in LA Theatre.
- The Word Begins (2011): LA Weekly “GO”, Backstage “Critics Pick”, Ovation Recommended.
- Vivien (2011): Backstage “Critics Pick”.
- Monkey Adored (2011): LA Weekly Theater Awards, Backstage “Critics Pick”, LA Weekly “GO”.
- Polly Warfeild Award for Best Season (2011): LA Drama Critics Circle.
- Lifetime Achievement Award, John Perrin Flynn (2011) LA Weekly
- Best Theatre in Los Angeles (2012) LA Weekly

One Night in Miami (2013) won three LA Drama Critics Circle Awards, four NAACP Theatre Awards (best playwright, best director, best ensemble cast, best producer) and LA Weekly Theater Awards for playwriting and direction.

Ovation Awards

Awards	Production	Nominations	Wins	Notes
2009 Ovation Awards	Treefall	1	0	
2010 Ovation Awards	Four Places	5	1	Won Best Production of a Play (Intimate Theater)
2011 Ovation Awards	Small Engine Repair	5	3	Won for Best Production, Director, and Acting Ensemble
2013 Ovation Awards	Dying City	5	1	Won Best Production of a Play (Intimate Theater)
2013 Ovation Awards	One Night in Miami...	4	0	
2013 Ovation Awards	A Bright New Boise	1	0	
2013 Ovation Awards		1	0	Nominated for Best Season

== New play development ==
Rogue Machine Theatre's new play program began as a rehearsed reading series called Rogue's Gallery of New Plays. Audience feedback sessions were moderated and dramaturgical notes were given to promising scripts. The development process has evolved to a multi-stepped playwright-focused series of events beginning with a dramaturg led roundtable with four writers discussing of early drafts of their new plays. Subsequent steps include readings, discussions, workshops and a late night workshop production, leading to the goal of a fully produced new play. Since 2008 Rogue Machine Theatre has produced 6 World Premieres, 1 American Premiere, 8 West Coast Premieres, and 3 Los Angeles Premieres. Playwrights in Residence include Jennie Webb, John Pollono, Mark Roberts, and Henry Murray.
