= Violent Ends =

- Theatrical release poster
- Directed by: John-Michael Powell
- Screenplay by: John-Michael Powell
- Produced by: Vincent Sieber-Smith; Undine Buka
- Starring: Billy Magnussen; James Badge Dale; Kate Burton; Ray McKinnon; Nick Stahl; Alexandra Shipp
- Cinematography: Elijah Guess
- Edited by: Mark Gasparo
- Music by: Anthony Willis
- Production company: Midnight Road Entertainment
- Distributed by: Independent Film Company
- Release date: October 31, 2025 (United States)
- Running time: 112 minutes
- Country: United States
- Language: English
- Budget: $2 million
- Box office: $185,131

Violent Ends is a 2025 American independent Southern Gothic crime thriller film written and directed by John-Michael Powell. The film stars Billy Magnussen, James Badge Dale, Kate Burton, Ray McKinnon, Nick Stahl, and Alexandra Shipp. Principal photography took place in Northwest Arkansas from October to November 2023, with an estimated production budget of $2 million.

The film was released in select cinemas in the United States on October 31, 2025, by Independent Film Company. The film received mixed reviews and grossed $185,131.

== Cast ==
- Billy Magnussen as Lucas Frost
- James Badge Dale as Sid Frost, Lucas's sadistic cousin and Walt's eldest son
- Kate Burton as Darlene Woodley, the deputy sheriff of Copperhead Creek and Lucas and Tuck's mother
- Ray McKinnon as Walt Frost, Lucas's uncle who manages the methamphetamine operations of the family drug trade
- Nick Stahl as Tuck Whitehead, Lucas's half-brother
- Alexandra Shipp as Emma Darling, Lucas's fianceé
- Sean Harrison Jones as Justin "Dickey" Dixon
- Matt Riedy as Ray Frost, Lucas's father
- Bruce McKinnon as Donny Frost, Lucas's uncle
- Jared Bankens as Eli Frost, Lucas's cousin and Sid's younger brother
- Vassiliki Ellwood as Tanya Whitehead
- Nathaniel Woolsey as Fiddle Frost
- Scott McLean Harrison as Reed Frost
- Travis Farris as Jeb Frost
- Faron Ledbetter as Whitney Oldham, a pastor
- Van Stewman Jr. as Merle Bateland
- James Vincent Dean as Tony Pugilese
- David Ury as Lou Byers
- Michael Lynn Thomas as Ellis Lamkin
- Jay Devon Johnson as Ralph Gaines, the sheriff of Copperhead Creek
- Rhonda Johnson Dents as Rosetta Ware

== Production ==
Writer and director John-Michael Powell, a native of North Little Rock, Arkansas, had "always wanted to set a film in [his] home state". He completed the first draft of the screenplay, originally titled The Killing Kind, in 2013. The film was "a few weeks away from shooting" in 2017 when the production "fell apart", and he subsequently wrote and directed the "microbudget" film The Send-Off (2022) during the COVID-19 pandemic. The Send-Off won the Audience Award at the Arkansas Cinema Society's Filmland, which came with a grant from Panavision that he used to partially fund Violent Ends.

Powell previously worked as an editor on the 2012 film The Brass Teapot which co-starred Billy Magnussen, whom he felt had "so much more in his well" while reviewing the production dailies. While casting Violent Ends, he "leapt at the opportunity" to work directly with Magnussen. During development, the film's title was changed from The Killing Kind to Violent Ends for "a host of reasons", including the premiere of the British television series The Killing Kind in September 2023.

Pre-production and location scouting began in mid-2023, and production offices were set up on July 13, 2023, with filming set to commence that October. The following day, the American actors' union SAG-AFTRA went on strike, forcing the film to shut down. The production team quickly applied for an independent waiver that would allow actors represented by SAG-AFTRA to appear in the film without violating the strike by agreeing to the union's proposed terms. The union granted the project an interim agreement to resume production in mid-September, days before the crew would have needed to delay filming to 2024. As actors could not be approached with offers during the strike, casting directors Lindsay Graham-Ahanonu and Liz Coulon had to hire the entire cast in four weeks, including James Badge Dale who was immediately available due to the strike.

Principal photography began in Northwest Arkansas in October 2023 with an estimated production budget of $2 million. Scenes were shot in various areas of the Ozark Mountains, the Crawford County Speedway near Van Buren, and a library in Berryville's town square. Filming wrapped in November. The sound mixing was completed at Skywalker Ranch in a week, and the film was finished in May 2024. During post-production, Powell took influence from Gladiator (2002) and added title cards to the beginning of the film to provide backstory about the Frost family and their criminal history, as he "didn't want [viewers] to get lost in the weeds of who every cousin is".

== Release ==
Violent Ends was submitted to several film festivals and shopped to distributors at the Sundance Film Festival, Cannes Film Festival, and South by Southwest, but it was not screened or purchased at any festivals. After South by Southwest, sales representatives with the UTA Independent Film Group and XYZ Films screened the film for buyers in Los Angeles, which resulted in "10 offers on the table". The film's North American distribution rights were ultimately acquired by Independent Film Company in May 2025.

The film was screened at the Arkansas Museum of Fine Arts on October 30, with Powell and producer Undine Buka participating in a question and answer session. The next day, the film was theatrically released in the United States. On November 18, it was made available for rental and purchase on over-the-top media services.

=== Box office ===
Violent Ends was released to 700 theaters on October 31, 2025, grossing $117,813 on its opening weekend and $179,046 in its opening week. In its second week, it grossed $6,085, closing with a total domestic gross of $185,131.

=== Critical response ===
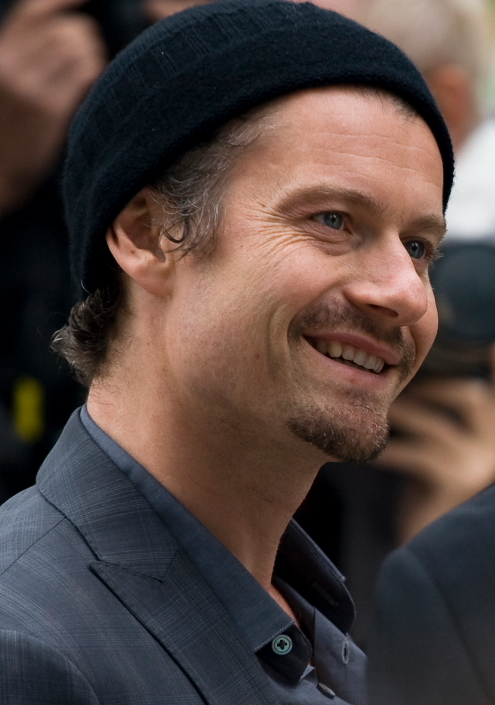
Several critics praised James Badge Dale's performance as a highlight of the film. (Note: Attributed to multiple references:)

On the review aggregator website Rotten Tomatoes, 67% of 30 critics' reviews are positive. Metacritic, which uses a weighted average, assigned the film a score of 53 out of 100, based on four critics, indicating "mixed or average" reviews.

Jim Vorel of Paste praised the film for its "stellar performances, gritty naturalism and exquisitely gruesome payoffs" while highlighting director of photography Elijah Guess's "detail-rich shooting". Kyle Logan of the Chicago Reader complimented Elijah Guess's cinematography and the film's tension, though he concluded that the film was "too generic to be something special". IndieWire's David Ehrlich highlighted the film's "vividly authentic sense of time and place" and Billy Magnussen's performance, but criticized the film's "canned dialogue and clichéd story beats" and its overall exploration of the cycle of violence.

In a less positive review for MovieWeb, Eric Goldman also called the film clichéd, describing it as "too mundane to ever achieve much impact". J. Kim Murphy of Variety summarized Violent Ends a "standard-issue revenge tale" with "familiar, simplistic plotting". RogerEbert.com's Robert Daniels also felt the film was generic, criticizing it for "lack[ing] a pulse and curiosity" and the ending for being non-committal to its overall "gloomy, hyper-violent" tone.
