= John Pollono =

American playwright, screenwriter and actor (born 1972)

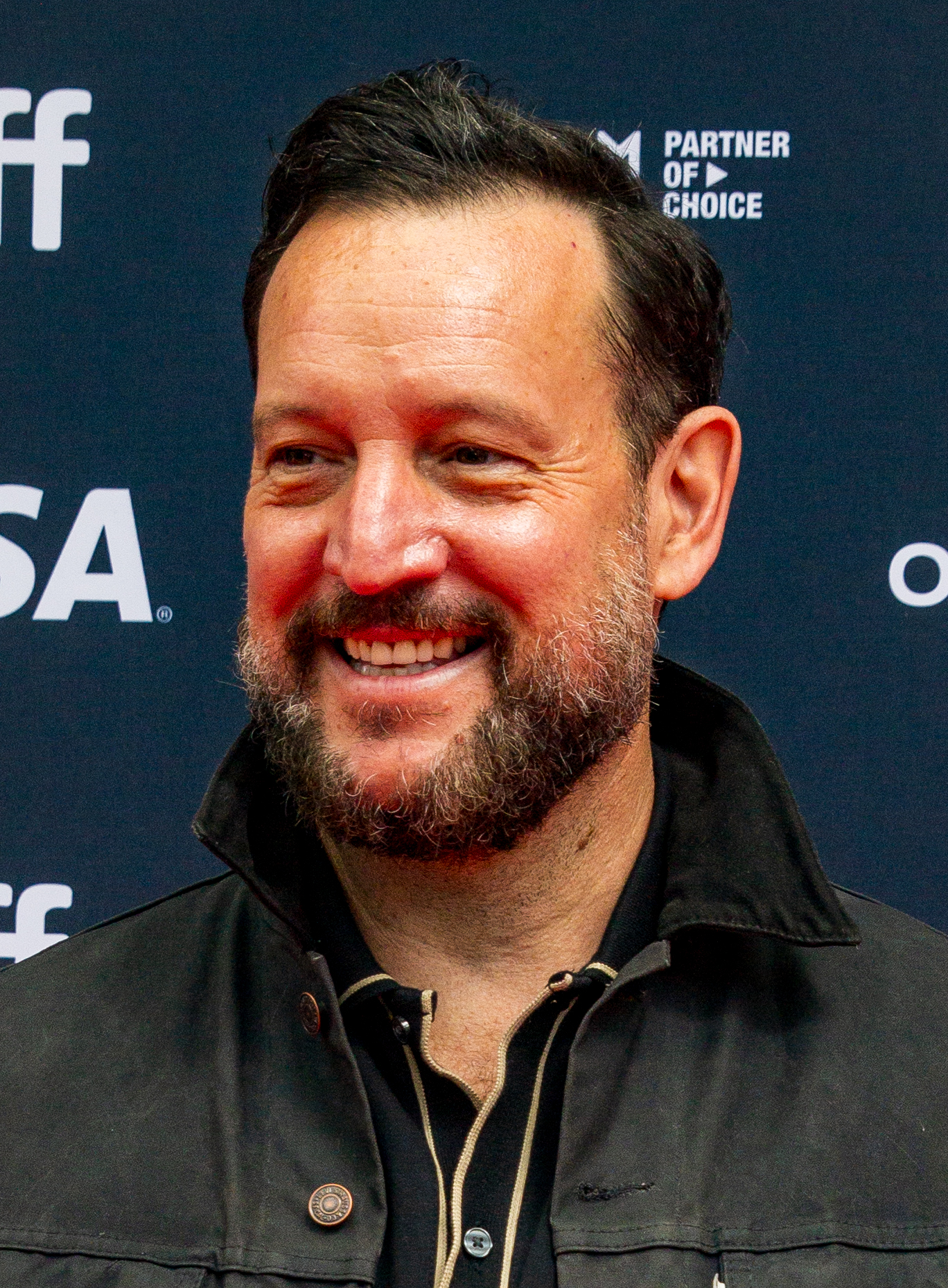
- Pollono at the 2024 Toronto International Film Festival
- Born: John A. Pollono; May 23, 1972 (age 54); New Hampshire
- Education: University of New Hampshire
- Occupations: Playwright, screenwriter, actor
- Spouse: Jennifer Pollono
- Children: 2
- Writing career
- Years active: 2000–present

John Pollono (born May 23, 1972) is an American playwright, screenwriter, and actor best known for writing Small Engine Repair, where he originated the role of Frank in the 2011 Los Angeles and 2013 New York City productions. He later made his feature directorial debut with the 2021 film adaptation of the same name, penning the screenplay and reprising his role from the original production. In addition to writing several plays, Pollono has written films such as Stronger (2017) and Riff Raff (2024), the former of which he made an uncredited appearance as Blackhawk.

He is also known for his recurring roles as Pat Dolan on the TNT neo-noir crime drama series Mob City (2013) and Tyler on the first season of the NBC comedy drama series This Is Us (2016–17). Pollono is active in the Los Angeles theater scene, serving as one of the playwrights-in-residence at Rogue Machine Theatre and a part of the playwriting collective The Temblors.

== Early life and education ==
Pollono was born May 23, 1972, in New Hampshire into a working-class Italian-American family; he has three sisters. He was raised in Londonderry, New Hampshire and graduated from Londonderry High School. Pollono has said that his childhood in New England has greatly influenced his work.

Pollono attended the University of New Hampshire, from which he graduated with a Bachelors of Arts in 1994. During one college summer, he studied film directing at New York University. After he moved to Los Angeles, he studied acting for a time at Howard Fine Studio.

== Career ==
=== 2000–2010: Early career ===
Pollono moved around the country and worked on writing screenplays part-time, before settling in Los Angeles in 2000. He later became interested in acting and helped to found the Jabberwocky Theatre Company in 2004. In 2008, Jabberwocky became Rogue Machine Theatre. Through Jabberwocky and Rogue Machine, Pollono was able to produce the plays he had written, his first full-length play being Lost and Found which was originally produced in 2006 at the Lounge Theatre in Los Angeles.

His next produced play was Razorback, which was staged in 2008 at Rogue Machine. One of his one-act plays, Illuminati, won Best Play at the 2010 Network One-Act Festival in New York City and his first iteration of his play Rules of Seconds was chosen to participate in the 2011 Last Frontier Theatre Conference in Alaska.

During this time, Pollono also guest starred in television series including How I Met Your Mother and Grey's Anatomy, and had other small acting credits on film and stage. He also worked professionally in entertainment PR.

=== 2011– 2017: Success on stage and screen ===
==== Stage ====
In 2011, Rogue Theatre produced Pollono's black comedy play Small Engine Repair, which in large part was inspired by his upbringing outside of Manchester, New Hampshire. Pollono starred as Frank, one of the play's three main characters. The play was first staged at Theatre/Theater in Los Angeles and was very successful, later transferring to the Beverly Hills Playhouse. A year-and-a-half later, the play was produced by MCC Theater in New York City and premiered at the off-Broadway Lucille Lortel Theatre. This marked Pollono's debut off-Broadway as a playwright and actor.

Simultaneously, Pollono's new play, Lost Girls premiered in Los Angeles at Theatre/Theater in Fall 2013. Lost Girls was picked up by MCC Theater for their 2015–2016 season and as produced off-Broadway in Fall 2015. Like Small Engine Repair, Lost Girls played at the Lucille Lortel Theatre and was directed by Jo Bonney.

In 2017, Pollono joined with other Los Angeles-based playwrights to form the playwriting collective The Temblors. A reworking of his play Rules of Seconds was produced in 2017 at the Los Angeles Theatre Center.

==== Screenwriting and acting ====
Pollono's first notable screen acting role was as Pat Dolan in the TNT series Mob City in 2013. Pollono's character appears in all six episodes of the show. Of note, Mob City stars Jon Bernthal, who Pollono had just acted opposite in Small Engine Repair at Theatre/Theater before production of the television show began. In 2014, Pollono guest starred in an episode of Intelligence. In 2016, Pollono began portraying Tyler, a co-worker of the character Randall in This Is Us.

In 2014, Pollono was tapped to write the screenplay for what would become the 2017 film Stronger, which starred Jake Gyllenhaal as Boston Marathon bombing survivor Jeff Bauman. The screenplay, based on Bauman's memoir Stronger, was number two on the Black List in 2016 and the film was released in 2017 to critical acclaim.

During the beginning of 2019, Pollono reprised his role in the film adaptation of Small Engine Repair, his directorial debut. The film was released in September 2021.

=== 2018–present: Upcoming projects ===
In February 2019, it was announced that Pollono was writing a screenplay based on the life of Hulk Hogan for Netflix. Directed by Todd Phillips and co-written by Scott Silver, the team that produced 2019's Joker, the film will star Chris Hemsworth.

== Personal life ==
Pollono is married to stage actress and founding member of Rogue Machine Theatre Jennifer Pollono; they have two children together, including actress Sophie Pollono.

Pollono lives in Los Angeles.

== Works and performances ==
=== Plays ===
Selected works

- Lost and Found, 2006, 2010 (rewrite)
- Razorback, 2008
- Illuminati, 2010
- Rules of Seconds, 2011, 2017 (rewrite)
- Small Engine Repair, 2011
- Lost Girls, 2013

=== Screenplays ===
- Sex & Marriage, 2013 (short film)
- Stronger, 2017
- Small Engine Repair, 2021
- Riff Raff, 2024
- Untitled Hulk Hogan Biopic, TBA (with Scott Silver and Todd Phillips)

=== Acting credits ===
==== Film ====
Year	Title	Role	Notes
2006	Pieces of Eight	Kimono Guy	
2011	Fort McCoy	Bud Gerkey	
2013	Sex & Marriage	Johnnie	Short film; also writer
2017	Stronger	Blackhawk	Uncredited; also writer
2017	Fight Your Way Out	Jim Gambello	
2021	Small Engine Repair	Frank Romanowski	Also writer and director
2024	Skincare	Gun Store Noah	

==== Television ====
Year	Title	Role	Notes
2008	How I Met Your Mother	Guy From Couple	Episode: "I Heart NJ"
2012	Grey's Anatomy	Charlie	Episode: "All You Need Is Love"
2012	Major Crimes	Derek Hansen	Episode: "The Shame Game"
2013	Masters of Sex	David Haas	Episode: "All Together Now"
2013	Mob City	Pat Dolan	Supporting; 6 episodes
2014	Intelligence	Eric Hanson	Episode: "Cain and Gabriel"
2016–2017	This Is Us	Tyler	Recurring; 5 episodes

==== Theater ====
Selected credits

Year	Title	Role	Venue	Company	Notes
2009	Half of Plenty	Marty	Theatre/Theater: May 22 – June 22, 2009	Rogue Machine Theatre	
2010	Lost and Found	Tommy	The Cherry Pit (FringeNYC): August 16–27, 2010	Rogue Machine Theatre	
2010	Lost and Found	Tommy	Lucille Lortel Theatre: September 18–25, 2010	Rogue Machine Theatre	
2011	Small Engine Repair	Frank	Theatre/Theater: March 25 – June 5, 2011	Rogue Machine Theatre	
2011	Small Engine Repair	Frank	Beverly Hills Playhouse: August – September 8, 2011	Rogue Machine Theatre	
2013	Small Engine Repair	Frank	Lucille Lortel Theatre: October 30 – December 8, 2013	MCC Theater	

== Publications ==
- Pollono, John. Small Engine Repair. New York: Dramatists Play Service, 2014. ISBN 978-0-8222-3142-4.
- Pollono, John. Lost Girls. New York: Dramatists Play Service, 2016. ISBN 978-0-8222-3144-8.
