= Emmanuelle Mattana =

Australian actress

- Notable work: Mustangs FC
- Website: emmanuellemattana.com.au

Emmanuelle Mattana (born 2000 or 2001) is an Australian actress and playwright, with a special focus on stories for young, queer audiences.

== Career ==
While in Year 11 of high school, Mattana was cast as Marnie, the protagonist in the ABC comedy-drama Mustangs FC.

Mattana is currently in residence with the Sydney Theatre Company's Watershed: Writers Group and on commission with Red Stitch Actors Theatre. Previously, she was a member of Malthouse Theatre's Emerging Writer's Group and the recipient of the Equity Foundation Scholarship to study at the Atlantic Acting School in New York.

=== Trophy Boys ===
Mattana's debut work as a playwright, Trophy Boys, took 18 months to write and debuted in 2022. The show is a "subversive satire" centering on the debate team of an all-boys' private high school; the male characters are performed by women and non-binary actors in drag. It toured Australia in 2024 to sold-out audiences and critical acclaim. It was awarded Sydney Theatre Award's Best New Australian Work, BroadwayWorld Australia's Best New Play in Melbourne and Best Performance for VCE Theatre Studies Students after its inclusion on the Victorian curriculum.

Trophy Boys had its American premiere at New York's MCC Theater in 2025 directed by Danya Taymor, and will also tour Australia once again.

== Early and personal life ==
Mattana was on her high school's debate team.

Mattana uses she/her and they/them pronouns.
