= Mustangs FC =

Australian comedy-drama television series

- Genre: Family; Comedy drama
- Created by: Amanda Higgs; Rachel Davis
- Directed by: Fiona Banks; Roger Hodgman; Tori Garrett; Corrie Chen
- Starring: Emmanuelle Mattana; Ashleigh Marshall; Monique Heath; Molly Broadstock; Gemma Chua-Tran; Celine Ajobong; Jacek Koman; Pia Miranda; Stephen Hall
- Narrated by: Celia Pacquola
- Composer: Bryony Marks
- Country of origin: Australia
- Original language: English
- No. of seasons: 3
- No. of episodes: 39

Production
- Executive producer: Debbie Lee
- Producers: Amanda Higgs; Rachel Davis
- Cinematography: Kath Chambers
- Running time: 24 minutes
- Production company: Matchbox Pictures

Original release
- Network: ABC Me (2017–2020)
- Release: 11 October 2017 – 1 January 2020

Mustangs FC is a 2017 Australian comedy-drama TV series aimed at young teenagers and starring Emmanuelle Mattana as the lead character. The show is set in suburban Australia, and focuses on Mustangs FC, an all-girls soccer team, and focuses on Mattana's character, Marnie, who lives with her mother, Jen (played by Pia Miranda), her mother's boyfriend, Kev, and Kev's daughter, Lara, as well as Marnie's friends and teammates.

Launched on International Day of the Girl in 2017, the show explores the relationship between team members, and the struggle to be taken seriously as an all-girls team. Mustangs FC was renewed for two seasons, the last being in 2020.

Mustangs FC was created by Amanda Higgs and Rachel Davis and produced by Davis and Higgs, with Debbie Lee serving as executive producer. The show was produced by Matchbox Pictures for ABC Me alongside the Australian Broadcasting Corporation, Screen Australia in association with Film Victoria. In October 2017, the show was nominated for Best Children's television series at the AACTA Awards

The show aired in the US on Universal Kids.

== Cast ==
- Emmanuelle Mattana as Marnie
- Ashleigh Marshall as Liv
- Gemma Chua-Tran as Anusha
- Molly Broadstock as Bella
- Celine Ajobong as Ruby
- Monique Heath as Lara
- Natasha Pearson as Michaela
- Pia Miranda as Jen
- Stephen Hall as Kev
- Jacek Koman as Danny
- Xavier West as Gabe
- Celia Pacquola as the narrator
- Tommy Little as the manager

=== Supporting ===
- Martha Berhane as Freya
- Hayet Dabbouss as Hanifa
- Tara Jakubowskij as Willow
- Lottie van Vijick as Alex
- Emily Carnibella as Simone
- Chelsea Ford as Magda
- Georgia Kirby as Trinity
- Jessica Faulkner as Madison
- Christie Whelan as Terry
- Fiona Choi as Cindy
- Mike McLeish as Sam
- Catherine Glavicic as Alicia
- Luke Christopoulos as Tom
- Ellmir Asipi as Hamet
- Clare Chihambakwe as Michelle
- Sophie Ashdowne as Summah
- Mitchell Lockhart as Miles
- Phoenix Raei as Lachy
- Rhett Schreuder as Jasper
- Tharanya Tharan as Zee
- Miah Madden as Jas
- Imogen Lamble as Georgie

== Episodes ==
| Season | Episodes | Originally released | |
| Season | Episodes | First released | Last released |
|---|---|---|---|
| 1 | 13 | October 11, 2017 | October 23, 2017 |
| 2 | 13 | January 1, 2019 | January 16, 2019 |
| 3 | 13 | January 1, 2020 | January 1, 2020 |

== Reception ==
The show received positive reviews, with Melinda Houston of The Canberra Times rating the show four out of five stars and receiving an AACTA award nomination for Best Children's television series. The show's premiere drew an audience of 38,000.
