= Some Girl(s) =

2006 play by Neil LaBute

- Off-Broadway cast promotional image
- Written by: Neil LaBute
- Original language: English
- Genre: Comedy-Drama

Premiere
- Date premiered: 2006
- Place premiered: Off-Broadway

Some Girl(s) is a play written by Neil LaBute about a man only identified as "Guy" who is about to get married. Before his wedding, he decides to visit his ex-girlfriends, all of whom he mistreated. His exes include Sam, his former high school sweetheart; Lindsay, a college professor from Boston; Tyler, his Chicago fling; and Bobbi, a woman from Los Angeles whom he actually could have ended up with.

== Productions ==
The play opened in London in May 2005 at the Gielgud Theatre. The cast included David Schwimmer in the lead role, Catherine Tate, Lesley Manville, Saffron Burrows and Sara Powell.

The play premiered Off-Broadway at the Lucille Lortel Theatre, produced by MCC Theater on June 8, 2006, and closed on July 8, 2006. Directed by Jo Bonney, the cast starred Eric McCormack (Guy), Fran Drescher (Lindsay), Judy Reyes (Tyler), Brooke Smith (Sam), and Maura Tierney (Bobbi), all known primarily for their television work.

The play was staged in Toronto at the Tarragon Theatre in the Extra Space from June 27 to 30, 2012.

London's Tower Theatre Company staged a revival of the play from 12 to 16 February 2013 at Theatro Technis in Camden Town.

== Adaptations ==
A film adaptation of Some Girl(s) premiered at the SXSW Festival on March 9, 2013. The film stars Adam Brody, who is credited as Man. It also stars Jennifer Morrison as Sam, Emily Watson as Lindsay, Mia Maestro as Tyler, Kristen Bell as Bobbi, and Zoe Kazan as a newly written character named Reggie, the younger sister of the main character's best friend. The screenplay was written by Neil LaBute and directed by Daisy von Scherler Mayer.
