= Henry Murray (playwright) =

American dramatist

Henry Murray (May 30, 1948 – December 16, 2014) was an American playwright who lived in Los Angeles, California. He is survived by his husband Lewin Wertheimer.

== Early life ==
Born Henry Darwin Murray Jr. in New Castle Delaware, he studied theatre at Middle Tennessee State University. He was hired by Nashville Children's Theatre as an actor and teacher of dance and mime. He was also a founding member of Nashville's Ensemble Theatre Company.

== Career ==
Murray's first performed play, The Skeletal Remains of an American Indian by the Light of the Harvest Moon, was presented at the Back Alley Theatre in Los Angeles. It starred James Leo Herlihy, actor and author of the novel, Midnight Cowboy.

In 2009, award-winning Rogue Machine Theatre produced and Artistic Director John Perrin Flynn directed Murray's play Treefall to great critical acclaim. It was named one of the ten best plays of the year by the LA Weekly, is published by Dramatists Play Service, and is being taught in the MFA playwriting classes at the University of Southern California.

Also in 2009, Murray's play Monkey Adored was honored with a reading at The Kennedy Center's Page to Stage Festival. Subsequently, it was workshopped by The Inkwell Theater in Washington, DC and in 2011 was produced at Rogue Machine Theatre in Los Angeles, with John Perrin Flynn directing. It received high praise critically, garnering a Critic's Pick from Backstage and a "GO" from the LA Weekly.

Based on Murray's short play Down For The Count, which was a finalist for the Heideman Award, Murray's full length, Three Views of the Same Object, won the 2011-2012 Woodward Newman Drama Prize. It premiered in April 2012 at The Bloomington Playwrights Project to critical accolades and sold-out houses. A Co-Premiere production opened in Los Angeles in Rogue Machine Theatre to rave reviews, including the LA Times "Critics Choice" and the LA Weekly's Pick of the Week.

Henry Murray's writing is persistently experimental in form and tone, yet thematically returns to the tension between the isolation of the individual and need for connection.

== Works ==
- The Skeletal Remains of an American Indian by the Light of The Harvest Moon (1982)
- Snake Dances (1984)
- The Hearing Trumpet (adaptation 2001)
- Down For The Count (2006)
- Treefall (2009)
- Dog Is Dead (2010)
- Monkey Adored (2011)
- Three Views of the Same Object (2012)
