= Small Engine Repair =

2011 play written by John Pollono

- Written by: John Pollono
- Characters: Frank; Packie; Swaino; Chad
- Original language: English
- Setting: A small engine repair shop in Manchester, New Hampshire

Premiere
- Date premiered: March 25, 2011
- Place premiered: Theatre/Theater, Los Angeles

Small Engine Repair is a play written by playwright-actor John Pollono. The play centers on three friends who gather one night under a mysterious premise at a repair shop in Manchester, New Hampshire, exploring the themes of regret, fraternity, and masculinity.

Originally produced in Los Angeles by Rogue Machine Theatre in 2011, Small Engine Repair premiered off-Broadway at the Lucille Lortel Theatre in November 2013. A film adaptation starring the original cast in various roles was produced in 2019 and was released in 2021.

== Synopsis ==
Frank, Swaino, and Packie, ex-high school friends who are now past their prime, get together one night during off-hours in Frank's remote repair shop for mysterious reasons that only Frank appears to know. Chad, a preppy, connected college jock, arrives and sparks a long-simmering animosity.

== Productions ==
The play premiered in 2011, produced by Rogue Machine Theatre in Los Angeles. The production was directed by Andrew Block. Playwright John Pollono and Block had previously collaborated on the FringeNYC 2010 play Lost and Found. David Mauer provided the set and lighting design, Jennifer Pollono was the costume designer and Tony Lepore was the sounds designer. The original cast consisted of Pollono portraying the character Frank, Michael Redfield as Packie, Jon Bernthal as Swaino, and Josh Helman as Chad.

The play first premiered at Theatre/Theater in Los Angeles on March 25, 2011. After critical acclaim, its limited run was extended until June 5. Following this run, the play transferred to the Beverly Hills Playhouse; this production was also extended after a successful run, running into September 2011. Actor Donnie Smith replaced Bernthal as Swaino when the play transferred. The production was generally well reviewed as well as popular, in part due to Bernthal's starring role on AMC's The Walking Dead at the time. The LA Times and LA Weekly both named it a Critic's Choice and it won many Los Angeles theater awards.

=== Off-Broadway premiere ===
In June 2012, it was announced that MCC Theater intended to include Small Engine Repair in their 2012–2013 season. It was to be staged beginning in May 2013 with both Pollono and Bernthal attached to reprise their roles. However, due to one or possibly both of the actor's filming schedules (both actors co-starred in the TNT miniseries Mob City which was in production beginning Spring 2013), the play was pushed to the 2013–2014 season, with previews beginning in October 2013. Ultimately, this schedule change conflicted with Bernthal's own filming schedule and in July 2013 it was announced that he had ceded his role.

The play premiered off-Broadway at the Lucille Lortel Theatre in New York in November 2013. The play's creative team included director Jo Bonney, set designer Richard Hoover, costume designer Theresa Squire, lighting designer Lap Chi Chu, and sound designer Jill BC Du Boff. A limited-run production, the play began previews on October 30, 2013, opened on November 20, 2013, and closed on December 21, 2013.

Pollono reprised his role as Frank while James Ransone took over the role of Packie, James Badge Dale portrayed Swaino, and Keegan Allen portrayed Chad.

== Characters and original casts ==
Character	Los Angeles Cast (2011)	Off-Broadway Cast (2013)
Frank	John Pollono	John Pollono
Packie	Michael Redfield	James Ransone
Swaino	Jon Bernthal (Note: Donnie Smith replaced Bernthal in the original run of Small Engine Repair)	James Badge Dale
Chad	Josh Helman	Keegan Allen

== Awards and nominations ==
=== Los Angeles production ===
Year	Award	Category	Nominee	Result
2011	Ovation Awards	Best Play – Intimate Theatre	Small Engine Repair	Won
2011	Ovation Awards	Acting Ensemble For A Play	Jon Bernthal, Josh Helman, John Pollono, and Michael Redfield	Won
2011	Ovation Awards	Playwrighting For An Original Play	John Pollono	Nominated
2011	Ovation Awards	Director of A Play	Andrew Block	Won
2011	Ovation Awards	Lead Actor in A Play	Jon Bernthal	Nominated
2011	Los Angeles Drama Critics Circle Awards	Outstanding Production	Small Engine Repair	Won
2011	Los Angeles Drama Critics Circle Awards	Outstanding Direction	Andrew Block	Won
2011	Los Angeles Drama Critics Circle Awards	Outstanding Writing	John Pollono	Won
2012	Back Stage Garland Awards	Outstanding Production	Small Engine Repair	Won
2012	Back Stage Garland Awards	Outstanding Playwrighting	John Pollono	Won
2012	Back Stage Garland Awards	Outstanding Ensemble	Jon Bernthal, Josh Helman, John Pollono, and Michael Redfield	Won

=== Off-Broadway production ===
Year	Award	Category	Nominee	Result
2014	Drama Desk Awards	Outstanding Set Design	Richard Hoover	Nominated
2014	Joe A. Callaway Awards	Excellence in Directing	Jo Bonney	Nominated

== Film adaptation ==
Small Engine Repair is a film written and directed by John Pollono based on his play, and was released on September 10, 2021.

== Publication ==
- Pollono, John. Small Engine Repair. New York: Dramatists Play Service, 2014. ISBN 978-0-8222-3142-4.
