= Josh Helman =

Australian actor (born 1986)

- Born: Joshua Helman; 22 February 1986 (age 40); Adelaide, South Australia, Australia
- Occupation: Actor
- Years active: 2007–present
- Known for: Mad Max: Fury Road and Furiosa: A Mad Max Saga; X-Men: Days of Future Past and X-Men: Apocalypse

Joshua Helman (born 22 February 1986) is an Australian actor. He portrayed Slit in the action film Mad Max: Fury Road (2015), William Stryker in the superhero film X-Men: Days of Future Past (2014) and its sequel X-Men: Apocalypse (2016), and Scabrous Scrotus in the action film Furiosa: A Mad Max Saga (2024). He has also appeared in several television series, as well as the films Jack Reacher (2012), Monster Hunter (2020), and Thirteen Lives (2022).

== Career ==
Helman started acting when he got a recurring role on the Australian television show Home and Away in 2007, playing Denni Maitland. He then got a small role in a short film Aidan's View where he played the role of an intruder trying to break into the house of the protagonist. A few years later, he was cast as Cpl. Lew "Chuckler" Juergens in the American television show, The Pacific. He appeared in six episodes. He was then signed on by American talent agency The Gersh Agency. He made his major studio motion picture debut in 2012 when he was cast as Jeb Oliver in Jack Reacher. He returned to Australia and was cast in Blinder, a film based on Australian rules football drama. In 2011, Helman acted in the original production of Small Engine Repair at Theatre Theater in Los Angeles. He also starred in its film adaptation released in 2021.

He co-starred in the ensemble Marvel Comics film, X-Men: Days of Future Past, as William Stryker—shown, through footage, to be the younger/1973 version of the Stryker played by Brian Cox in X2 (2003), ignoring the younger/1973/1979 version of Stryker played by Danny Huston in X-Men Origins: Wolverine (2009). He later played Slit, alongside two-time fellow X-Men actor Nicholas Hoult, in the Mad Max sequel Mad Max: Fury Road (2015). In 2016, he had a main role in season two of the television series Wayward Pines, while in 2024, he played Scabrous Scrotus, son of Immortan Joe, in the Mad Max prequel Furiosa: A Mad Max Saga.

On 17 February 2025, Helman was named in the Stan Australia series Watching You.

By January 2026, he was cast in the horror film Evil Dead Wrath from director Francis Galluppi.

== Filmography ==
=== Film ===
Year	Title	Role	Notes
2007	All My Friends Are Leaving Brisbane	Party Guest / Wedding Guest	
2009	Aidan's View	The Intruder	Short film
2010	Animal Kingdom	Const. Peter Simmons	
2012	Jack Reacher	Jeb Oliver	
2013	Blinder	Morts	
2014	X-Men: Days of Future Past	William Stryker Mystique (as Stryker)	
2015	Mad Max: Fury Road	Slit	
2015	At Home with Mystic	Arnie	Short film
2015	A Country Called Home	James	
2016	Falling	Malcolm Washington	
2016	X-Men: Apocalypse	William Stryker	
2016	Crazy Cat Lady	Good Date	
2017	Kate Can't Swim	Nick	
2017	My Name Is Lenny	Lenny McLean	
2018	Undertow	Brett	
2019	Feast of the Seven Fishes	Juke	
2019	Washland Express	James	Short film
2020	Monster Hunter	Steeler	
2021	Small Engine Repair	Anthony Romanowski	
2022	Thirteen Lives	Major Hodges	
2024	Furiosa: A Mad Max Saga	Scabrous Scrotus	
2028	Evil Dead Wrath	TBA	Post-production

=== Television ===
Year	Title	Role	Notes
2007	Home and Away	Denni Maitland	5 episodes
2009	McLeod's Daughters	Grown Up Xander	Episode: "The Long Paddock"
2010	The Pacific	PFC Lew 'Chuckler' Juergens	Miniseries; 6 episodes
2015	Flesh and Bone	Bryan	Miniseries; 8 episodes
2016	Wayward Pines	Xander Beck	10 episodes
2018	The End of the World As We Know It	Quinn	Television film
2019	The Loudest Voice	James Murdoch	Miniseries; 2 episodes
2019	Soundtrack	Pete Fairman	Episode: "Track 8: Gigi and Jean"
2020	Deputy	Deputy Carter	6 episodes
2022	Troppo	Bryce	3 episodes
2023	Harley Quinn	Captain Boomerang	Voice; episode: "A Very Problematic Valentine's Day Special"
2025	Optics	Archie Toole	1 episode
2025	Watching You	Dan	6 episodes
