= Trophy Boys =

2022 play by Emmanuelle Mattana

- 2025 American premiere promotional poster
- Original language: English
- Written by: Emmanuelle Mattana
- Characters: Owen; Jared; David; Scott
- Subject: Feminism

Premiere
- Date: 2022
- Place: La Mama Theatre, Melbourne, Australia

Trophy Boys is a satirical play by Emmanuelle Mattana. It premiered in Melbourne, Australia in 2022 and made its off-Broadway debut in 2025.

== Synopsis ==
A debate team from an elite all-boys prep school prepare for a debate match, but the team is thrown for a loop when they find out they have been assigned the affirmative position on the debate statement "feminism has failed women." The team first strategizes to “out-feminist the feminists” by arguing that mainstream white feminism is not intersectional enough. Another boy suggests strategically forfeiting in solidarity with women. Halfway through the play, an anonymous accusation of sexual assault against a member of the team derails them.

Every character in Trophy Boys is played by a female or non-binary actor, a casting choice that playwright Mattana deemed "nonnegotiable." The play is 70 minutes long with no intermission.

== Production history ==
Trophy Boys premiered in Melbourne, Australia in 2022 at the La Mama Theatre. After the first sold-out run, it had a run at fortyfivedownstairs in Melbourne as part of the 2023 Midsumma Festival, and a 2024 run at Arts Centre Melbourne.

In 2025, the show went on tour in Australia, performing at Queensland Performing Arts Centre, Riverside Theatres, Carriageworks, and Arts Centre Melbourne.

Also in 2025, Trophy Boys made its American debut off-Broadway at the MCC Theater. The production was directed by Danya Taymor, known for directing The Outsiders and John Proctor Is the Villain on Broadway.
