= Some Girl(s) (film) =

- Theatrical release poster
- Directed by: Daisy von Scherler Mayer
- Screenplay by: Neil LaBute
- Based on: Some Girl(s) by Neil LaBute
- Produced by: Andrew Carlberg; Chris Schwartz; Patty West
- Starring: Adam Brody; Kristen Bell; Zoe Kazan; Mía Maestro; Jennifer Morrison; Emily Watson
- Cinematography: Rachel Morrison
- Edited by: Michael Darrow
- Music by: David Carbonara
- Production company: Pollution Studios
- Distributed by: Leeden Media
- Release dates: March 9, 2013 (SXSW); June 26, 2013 (United States)
- Running time: 90 minutes
- Country: United States
- Language: English

Some Girl(s) is a 2013 American comedy film directed by Daisy von Scherler Mayer and written by Neil LaBute. It is based on the play of the same name, also written by LaBute. The film stars Adam Brody, Kristen Bell, Zoe Kazan, Mía Maestro, Jennifer Morrison and Emily Watson. The film was released on June 26, 2013, by Leeden Media.

== Plot ==
Some Girl(s) follows a successful writer, simply referred to as "Man," who embarks on a cross-country trip to visit a series of ex-girlfriends before his upcoming wedding.

The film opens with Man visiting Sam, his high school girlfriend, in Seattle. Sam is now married with children but is still deeply hurt by how Man abruptly ended their relationship without explanation. Their meeting is awkward, as Sam reveals that Man's sudden departure years ago left her emotionally scarred, highlighting his pattern of selfish behavior.

Next, Man travels to Chicago to see Tyler, a free-spirited woman with whom he had a passionate, yet tumultuous relationship. Tyler's playful nature contrasts with the emotional tension of their reunion. Despite her carefree demeanor, Tyler expresses lingering resentment towards Man for his lack of commitment and for abandoning her when things got serious.

In Boston, Man meets with Lindsay, a college professor and former mentor, who is married to a much older man. Their relationship had been an affair, and Lindsay is visibly upset by Man's reappearance in her life. She accuses him of manipulating her feelings and using her to boost his own ego, leaving her to deal with the fallout.

Man returns to Seattle where he reconnects with Reggie, a childhood friend whom he once took advantage of during a vulnerable moment. Reggie is now an adult and confronts Man about the incident, revealing that it has haunted her for years. She accuses him of being oblivious to the impact his actions have on others, pointing out his tendency to move through life without considering the consequences of his behavior.

Finally, in Los Angeles, Man visits Bobbi, the woman he almost married. Bobbi is now married and has moved on, but the emotional wounds from their broken engagement still linger. Their conversation reveals that Man ended their relationship out of fear of commitment, a recurring theme throughout his encounters with the other women. Bobbi challenges Man to confront his fear of intimacy and his habit of running away when things get too real.

The film concludes with Man realizing that his journey was less about seeking forgiveness and more about confronting his own flaws. Despite the epiphanies he gains from each encounter, the film ends ambiguously, leaving it unclear whether he will truly change or continue his pattern of self-centered behavior.

== Cast ==
- Adam Brody as The Man
- Kristen Bell as Bobbi
- Zoe Kazan as Reggie
- Mía Maestro as Tyler
- Jennifer Morrison as Sam
- Emily Watson as Lindsay
- Laura Mann as Flight Attendant
- Kathleen Christy as Flight Attendant #2

== Release ==
The film premiered at South by Southwest on March 9, 2013. The film was released on 26 June 2013, by Leeden Media, and opened in theaters in New York and Los Angeles. The film was the first feature to launch day and date on Vimeo On Demand, available all around the world, for streaming or downloading-and-owning, with a 90/10 revenue split.

== Reception ==
On the review aggregator website Rotten Tomatoes, 53% of 30 critics' reviews are positive.
