= Jo Bonney =

American theater director

- Born: Australia
- Occupation: Theater director
- Spouse: Eric Bogosian (m. 1980)
- Children: 2

Jo Bonney is an Australian-American theater director who has worked Off-Broadway, regionally and internationally, primarily focused on the development of new plays.

== Early life and education ==
Bonney was born in Australia, the daughter of a Qantas airline pilot and a former-journalist. She attended Sydney University before transferring to Sydney College of the Arts (Grad. Fine Arts) and worked at The Australian Broadcasting Corporation.

== Marriage and children ==
Bonney married Eric Bogosian in 1980 with whom she has two sons, Harry and Travis Bogosian.

== Career ==
Bonney moved to New York City in 1979. In the early 1980s, she co-directed two short films with Ruth Peyser, 'Another Great Day' (shown nationally on PBS) and 'Random Positions'. Bonney began her work in theater directing the solo work of her husband, Eric Bogosian. She cites The Public Theater founder, Joseph Papp as providing the support she needed to "define [herself] as a director." She has directed the premiere productions of over thirty plays – notably work by Bogosian, Lynn Nottage, Danny Hoch, Suzan-Lori Parks, Martina Majok, Neil LaBute, Naomi Wallace and José Rivera. Bonney edited Extreme Exposure: An Anthology of Solo Performance Texts from the Twentieth Century (published in 2000 by TCG).

== Awards and nominations ==
Awards and nominations Bonney has received include:

- 2023 Tony Award nomination, Best Direction of a Play, Cost of Living
- 2019 Obie Award, Sustained Excellence of Direction
- 2018 Lucille Lortel, Outstanding Director Nomination, Mlima's Tale
- 2018 Outer Critics Circle, Outstanding Director nomination, Cost of Living
- 2018 Legends of Off-Broadway
- 2014 Joseph Callaway Award (SDC)
- 2013 Audelco Award, Father Comes Home from the Wars: Parts 1, 2 & 3
- 2011 Drama Desk, Best Director nomination, By the Way, Meet Vera Stark
- 2011 Lucille Lortel, Best Director nomination, By the Way, Meet Vera Stark
- 2011 Lilly Award (Directing)
- 2003 Lucille Lortel, Outstanding Director Best Revival, Fifth of July
- 1998 Obie Award, Sustained Excellence of Direction

== Work ==
Year	Play	Playwright	Theater
1983	funHouse	Eric Bogosian	Actor's Playhouse
1990	Sex, Drugs, Rock & Roll	Eric Bogosian	Orpheum Theatre
1994	Some People	Danny Hoch	The Public Theater
1994	Pounding Nails in the Floor with My Forehead	Eric Bogosian	Minetta Lane Theatre
1995	subUrbia	Eric Bogosian	Studio Theater (DC)
1997	The Flatted Fifth	Seth Zvi Rosenfeld	INTAR Theatre
1998	Stray Cats	Warren Leight	Naked Angels
1998	Stop Kiss	Diana Son	The Public Theater
1998	Jails, Hospitals & Hip Hop	Danny Hoch	PS 122, US & International Tour
1999	Look Back in Anger	John Osborne	CSC Theatre
2000	Wake Up and Smell the Coffee	Eric Bogosian	Jane Street Theatre
2000	House Arrest * Directorial Consultant	Anna Deavere Smith	The Public Theater
2001	Good Thing	Jessica Goldberg	The New Group
2001	Slanguage	Universes	NY Theatre Workshop
2001	References to Salvador Dali Make Me Hot	José Rivera	The Public Theater
2002	Adoration of the Old Woman	José Rivera	La Jolla Playhouse
2002	Humpty Dumpty	Eric Bogosian	McCarter Theatre Center
2003	Living Out	Lisa Loomer	Second Stage Theater
2003	Fifth of July	Lanford Wilson	Signature Theater
2004	Fat Pig	Neil LaBute	MCC
2004	Anna in the Tropics	Nilo Cruz	Arena Stage
2005	A Soldier's Play	Charles Fuller	Second Stage Theater
2005	On the Mountain	Christopher Shimm	Playwrights Horizons
2005	Top Girls	Caryl Churchill	Williamstown Theatre Festival
2006	subUrbia	Eric Bogosian	Second Stage Theater
2006	Some Girl(s)	Neil LaBute	MCC
2006	The Seven	Will Power	NY Theatre Workshop
2007	All That I Will Ever Be	Alan Ball	NY Theatre Workshop
2008	Beast	Michael Weller	NY Theatre Workshop
2010–2011	The Break of Noon	Neil LaBute	MCC, Geffen Playhouse
2012	Emotional Creature	Eve Ensler	Market Theater (Johannesburg), Cine 13 (Paris), Berkeley Rep, Signature Theatre
2012	An Early History of Fire	David Rabe	The New Group
2013	Small Engine Repair	John Pollono	MCC
2013	The Mound Builders	Lanford Wilson	Signature Theatre
2014–2016	Father Comes Home from the War (Parts 1, 2, and 3)	Suzan-Lori Parks	The Public Theater, London Royal Court, ART, CTG
2015	Lost Girls	John Pollono	MCC
2015	Kinship	Carey Perloff	Williamstown Theatre Festival
2016	The Body of an American	Dan O'Brien	Primary Stages
2017	The Red Letter Plays: F-ing A	Suzan-Lori Parks	Signature Theatre
2017	Cost of Living	Martyna Majok	Manhattan Theater Club
2018	Eve's Song	Ione Patricia Lloyd	The Public Theater
2018	Mlima's Tale	Lynn Nottage	The Public Theater
2018	An Ordinary Muslim	Hammaad Chaudry	NY Theatre Workshop
2018	The Untranslatable Secrets of Nikki Corona	José Rivera	Geffen Playhouse
2019	The Way She Spoke	Isaac Gomez	Audible Theater
2020	72 Miles to Go	Hilary Bettis	Roundabout Theatre Company
2023	Sabbath's Theater	John Turturro and Ariel Levy	Pershing Square Signature Center
