= MCC Theater =

American theater company

Manhattan Class Company Theater
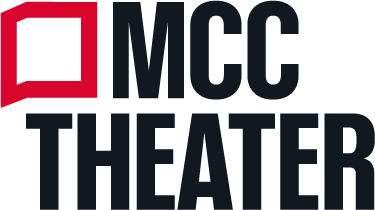

- The Robert W. Wilson MCC Theater Space
- Founded: 1986
- Founders: Robert LuPone; Bernard Telsey; William Cantler
- Headquarters: New York City, New York, United States
- Revenue: 9,812,282 United States dollar (2017)
- Total assets: 29,757,565 United States dollar (2022)
- Website: mcctheater.org

MCC Theater (Manhattan Class Company) is an off-Broadway theater company located in New York City. The theater was founded in 1986 by artistic directors Robert LuPone, Bernard Telsey and William Cantler. Blake West joined the company in 2006 as executive director. MCC opened its current location in Manhattan's Hell's Kitchen neighborhood, as The Robert W. Wilson MCC Theater Space, on January 9, 2019.

== Productions ==
MCC Theater's productions include:

- Jocelyn Bioh's School Girls; Or, the African Mean Girls Play
- Penelope Skinner's The Village Bike
- Robert Askins' Hand to God (Broadway transfer; five 2015 Tony Award nominations including Best Play)
- John Pollono's Small Engine Repair
- Paul Downs Colaizzo's Really Really
- Sharr White's The Other Place (Broadway transfer)
- Jeff Talbott's The Submission (Laurents/Hatcher Award)
- Neil LaBute's Reasons to Be Happy, Reasons to Be Pretty (Broadway transfer, three 2009 Tony Award nominations, including Best Play), Some Girl(s), Fat Pig, The Mercy Seat, and All The Ways To Say I Love You
- Michael Weller's Fifty Words
- Alexi Kaye Campbell's The Pride
- Bryony Lavery's Frozen (Broadway transfer; four 2004 Tony Award nominations including Best Play, Tony Award for Best Featured Actor)
- Tim Blake Nelson's The Grey Zone
- Rebecca Gilman's The Glory of Living (2002 Pulitzer Prize finalist)
- Margaret Edson's Wit (1999 Pulitzer Prize) and the musicals Coraline, Carrie, and Ride the Cyclone.

Many plays developed and produced by MCC have gone on to productions throughout the country and around the world.

== Key players ==
- Robert LuPone – Artistic Director
- Bernard Telsey – Artistic Director
- William Cantler – Artistic Director
- Blake West – Executive Director

== Artists ==
MCC has engaged a collection of directors and artists that have included:

- Lynn Redgrave
- Michael Greif
- Jo Bonney
- Doug Hughes
- Philip Seymour Hoffman
- Julianna Margulies
- Liev Schreiber
- Jim Simpson
- Benjamin Bratt
- Swoosie Kurtz
- Kathleen Chalfant
- Allison Janney
- Anna Paquin
- Judith Light
- Marisa Tomei
- Lili Taylor
- Sigourney Weaver
- Jeremy Piven
- Keri Russell
- Calista Flockhart
- Bridget Fonda
- Eric McCormack
- Fran Drescher
- Peter Hedges
- Jane Alexander
- Ron Livingston
- Ben Shenkman
- Maura Tierney
- Kyra Sedgwick
- Joanna Gleason
- Lisa Gay Hamilton
- Gil Bellows
- Polly Draper
- Thomas Gibson
- Michael C. Hall
- Lisa Harrow
- Derek Anson Jones
- Raúl Esparza
- John Spencer
- Kathleen Turner
- Stephin Merritt
- David Greenspan
- Piper Perabo
- Frederick Weller
- Sarah Paulson
- Dominic Chianese
- Hugh Dancy
- Ben Whishaw
- Charles Busch
- Kara Young

== Mainstage productions ==
2025–2026

- Caroline by Preston Max Allen
- Cold War Choir Practice by Ro Reddick
- Birthright by Jonathan Spector

2024–2025

- Table 17 by Douglas Lyons
- Shit. Meet. Fan. by Robert O'Hara
- Trophy Boys by Emmanuelle Mattana

2023–2024

- Mary Gets Hers by Emma Horwitz
- Walk On Through: Confessions of a Museum Novice by Gavin Creel
- The Connector by Jason Robert Brown
- The Lonely Few by Zoe Sarnak and Rachel Bonds

2022-2023

- Only Gold by Kate Nash, Andy Blankenbuehler and Ted Malawer
- Wolf Play by Hansol Jung
- Bees and Honey by Guadalís Del Carmen
- Wet Brain by John J. Caswell, Jr.

2021–2022

- Nollywood Dreams by Jocelyn Bioh
- Space Dogs (musical) by Nick Blaemire and Van Hughes (actor/writer)
- Which Way to the Stage by Ana Nogueira
- Uncensored
- soft by Donja R. Love

2019–2020

- The Wrong Man by Ross Golan
- Seared by Theresa Rebeck
- All the Natalie Portmans by C.A. Johnson
- Nollywood Dreams by Jocelyn Bioh
- Perry Street by Lucy Thurber

2018–2019

- Collective Rage: A Play in 5 Betties by Jen Silverman
- School Girls; Or, the African Mean Girls Play by Jocelyn Bioh
- The Light by Loy A. Webb
- Alice by Heart by Duncan Sheik, Steven Sater and Jesse Nelson
- BLKS by Aziza Barnes
- Moscow Moscow Moscow Moscow Moscow Moscow by Halley Feiffer

2017–2018

- Charm by Philip Dawkins
- School Girls; Or, The African Mean Girls Play by Jocelyn Bioh
- Relevance by JC Lee
- Transfers by Lucy Thurber

2016–2017

- All The Ways to Say I Love You by Neil LaBute
- Ride the Cyclone by Brooke Maxwell and Jacob Richmond
- YEN by Anna Jordan
- The End of Longing by Matthew Perry

2015–2016

- The Legend of Georgia McBride by Matthew Lopez
- Lost Girls by John Pollono
- Smokefall by Noah Haidle
- A Funny Thing Happened on the Way to the Gynecological Oncology Unit at Memorial Sloan-Kettering Cancer Center of New York by Halley Feiffer

2014–2015

- The Money Shot by Neil LaBute
- Punk Rock by Simon Stephens
- The Nether by Jennifer Haley
- Permission by Robert Askins

2013–2014

- Small Engine Repair by John Pollono
- Hand to God by Robert Askins
- The Village Bike by Penelope Skinner

2012–2013

- Don't Go Gentle by Stephen Belber
- Really Really by Paul Downs Colaizzo
- Reasons to Be Happy by Neil LaBute

2011–2012

- The Submission by Jeff Talbott
- Wild Animals You Should Know by Thomas Higgins
- Carrie by Lawrence D. Cohen

2010–2011

- The Break of Noon book by Neil LaBute
- The Other Place by Sharr White
- Side Effects by Michael Weller

2009–2010

- Family Week book by Beth Henley
- The Pride by Alexi Kaye Campbell
- Still Life by Alexander Dinelaris

2008–2009

- Coraline book by David Greenspan, music and lyrics by Stephin Merritt
- Fifty Words by Michael Weller
- The Third Story by Charles Busch

2007–2008

- Spain by Jim Knable
- Grace by Mick Gordon and A. C. Grayling
- reasons to be pretty by Neil LaBute

2006–2007

- In A Dark Dark House by Neil LaBute
- A Very Common Procedure by Courtney Baron
- Nixon's Nixon by Russell Lees

2005–2006

- Some Girl(s) by Neil LaBute
- The Wooden Breeks by Glen Berger
- Colder than Here by Laura Wade

2004–2005

- Last Easter by Bryony Lavery
- Fat Pig by Neil LaBute
- What of the Night based on the writings of Djuna Barnes

2003–2004

- Bright Ideas by Eric Coble
- Frozen by Bryony Lavery
- The Distance from Here by Neil LaBute

2002–2003

- Mercy Seat by Neil LaBute
- Scattergood by Anto Howard
- Intrigue with Faye by Kate Robin

2001–2002

- The Glory of Living by Rebecca Gilman
- Runt of the Litter by Bo Eason
- A Letter from Ethel Kennedy by Christopher Gorman

2000–2001

- A Place at the Table by Simon Block
- High Dive by Leslie Ayvazian
- The Dead Eye Boy by Angus MacLachlan

1999–2000

- Trudy Blue by Marsha Norman
- Sueño by Jose Rivera
- Yard Gal by Rebecca Prichard

1998–1999

- Wit by Margaret Edson
- The English Teachers by Ed Napier
- Angelique by Lorena Gale

1997–1998

- Anadarko by Tim Blake Nelson

1996–1997

- The Gravity of Means by John Kolvenbach
- Good as New by Peter Hedges

1995–1996

- Nixon's Nixon by Russell Lees
- The Grey Zone by Tim Blake Nelson
- Three in the Back, Two in the Head by Jason Sherman

1994–1995

- Girl Gone by Jacquelyn Reingold

1993–1994

- The Able Bodied Seaman by Alan Bowne
- Liar, Liar by Dael Orlandersmith

1992–1993

- Five Women Wearing the Same Dress by Alan Ball
- D Train by James Bosley and Fay Simpson

1991–1992

- A Snake in the Vein by Alan Bowne

1987–1988

- Beirut by Alan Bowne

== External reviews ==
- Official website
