= Small Engine Repair (film) =

- Theatrical release poster
- Directed by: John Pollono
- Screenplay by: John Pollono
- Based on: Small Engine Repair by John Pollono
- Produced by: Peter Abrams; Jon Bernthal; Rick Rosenthal; Noah Rothman
- Starring: Jon Bernthal; Shea Whigham; John Pollono; Spencer House
- Cinematography: Matt Mitchell
- Edited by: Christopher Robin Bell; David Moritz
- Music by: Kathryn Kluge; Kim Allen Kluge
- Production companies: Tapestry Films; Whitewater Films; TMWRK; Underground Films
- Distributed by: Vertical Entertainment
- Release date: September 10, 2021
- Running time: 103 minutes
- Language: English
- Box office: $110,995

Small Engine Repair is a 2021 American independent black comedy crime drama film written and directed by John Pollono, basing the film's screenplay from his own 2011 play of the same name.

== Plot ==
In Manchester, New Hampshire, Frank is released from jail and calls his friends Swaino and Packie to meet him at his engine repair shop. They had been taking care of his 4-year-old daughter Crystal, whose mother Karen is not in their lives. The film jumps ahead a number of years, to where Crystal is a high schooler and applying to colleges. It is revealed that Frank has given up drinking and smoking, and presses his daughter to do the same.

Swaino and Packie come over for Christmas dinner, where Crystal reveals she has been accepted to UCLA. After dinner, Crystal's estranged mother Karen arrives to pick her up and take her out shopping. Terrance & Packie take Frank out for a drink, saying he can have a seltzer. The friends get into an argument with another group of men, and Frank attempts to smooth things out, but a fist-fight ensues and Frank assaults one of the men.

Three months pass, and none of the friends have spoken. Frank texts them asking them to meet him at his repair shop, lying to them about the reason. Initially the friends are verbally hostile towards each other. Frank reveals a bottle of Johnnie Walker Blue, saying he wants to drink, eat steaks, and watch a pay-per-view MMA fight together.

The three friends eat, have another argument, and then Frank gets a phone call, giving directions to the shop to someone. He tells his friends that his friend Chad is coming over to deliver some ecstasy. The friends continue to drink and smoke pot.

Chad shows up and delivers the drugs, and Frank goes inside. Chad then tells a story about how he got a girl to send him nude photos on his phone, and he ended up showing them to his whole school. This caused the girl to be relentlessly ridiculed and eventually caused her to attempt suicide with pills, putting her into a coma. Chad shows zero remorse for the incident.

The men go back inside, and Frank insists on Chad telling him what they were talking about. Chad realizes that the girl in the photo was Crystal, and he attempts to run, but Frank knocks him out with a wrench. Frank reveals he set up this night with a plan to kill Chad, and needed Swaino and Packie there to assist with the disposal of the body. They tie him up, but just before they murder him, they realize that he posted to Instagram after he arrived, so the police would know where he was that night.

Karen shows up looking for Crystal, thinking that Frank was keeping her away from their daughter, unaware of her suicide attempt. They tell her the story, and she says that they can outsmart Chad. Swaino comes up with an idea to blackmail Chad by taking a homosexual photo of him. Packie puts his genitals in Chad's mouth and they take a photo, saying that they will distribute the photo if he says anything about what happened that night. Chad agrees, and leaves. The four of them then go visit Crystal in the hospital, telling her that her family is here.

== Cast ==
- Jon Bernthal as Terrance Swaino
  - Hunter Jones as Young Terrance Swaino
- John Pollono as Frank Romanowski
  - Zachary Hernandez as Young Frank Romanowski
- Shea Whigham as Packie Hanrahan
- Spencer House as Chad Walker
- Jordana Spiro as Karen Delgado
- Ciara Bravo as Crystal Romanowski
  - Nina Peterson as Young Crystal Romanowski
    - Addie Bernthal as 4-Year-Old Crystal Romanowski
- Josh Helman as Anthony Romanowski
- Michael Redfield as Tommy Hanrahan
- Ashlie Atkinson as Diane Swaino
- Jenna Lamia as Patty Swaino
- Joshua Bitton as Lawrence Swaino
- Shannon Esper as Judy Swaino
- John Rothman as Mr. Walker
- Ajna Jai as Afnahn
- Tom Draper as Mikey, The Bartender
- Jennifer Pollono as Dottie
- James Badge Dale as "Badge"
- James Ransone as P.J.

== Production ==
First announced in January 2019, a film adaptation of the play Small Engine Repair was produced early that year. Production began in February 2019 outside of New York City, namely in Yonkers and Tappan, New York. Although, some establishing shots were taken in Manchester, New Hampshire, the city where the film takes place.

The film was penned and directed by John Pollono and produced by Peter Abrams, Jon Bernthal, Rick Rosenthal, and Noah Rothman. Pollono and Bernthal reprise their roles from the original production and Shea Whigham and Spencer House portray Packie and Chad, respectively. Michael Redfield and Josh Helman, who both starred in the original production, are in the film as new characters. Additionally, Jennifer Pollono, the original costume designer, and Sophie Pollono, her daughter with John Pollono, also have roles in the film.

== Release ==
The adaptation was slated to premiere in March 2020 as part of the SXSW Festival's Narrative Spotlight. Following the cancellation of the festival that year, the premiere was put on hold. The film instead premiered on the 2020 SXSW Online Festival. Small Engine Repair was released in theaters by Vertical Entertainment on September 10, 2021.

== Reception ==
On review aggregator Rotten Tomatoes, the film holds an 78% approval rating based on 49 reviews with an average rating of 7.2/10.
