= Day Zero (2007 film) =

2007 American film directed by Bryan Gunnar Cole

- Theatrical poster
- Directed by: Bryan Gunnar Cole
- Written by: Robert Malkani
- Produced by: Robert Malkani; Anthony Moody; Daniel Sollinger
- Starring: Elijah Wood; Chris Klein; Jon Bernthal
- Distributed by: First Look Studios
- Release dates: April 29, 2007 (Tribeca Film Festival); January 18, 2008 (United States)
- Running time: 93 minutes
- Country: United States
- Language: English
- Box office: $16,659 (United States)

Day Zero is a 2007 American drama film directed by Bryan Gunnar Cole and written by Robert Malkani. Set in the near future when global terrorism has forced the military to reinstate the draft, three young men, who have just received their induction notices and have 30 days to report for duty, must battle their political views before making a decision that will change their lives forever.

This is American director Cole's debut film. It premiered at the 2007 Tribeca Film Festival and opened in limited release in the United States on January 18, 2008. The film stars Elijah Wood, Chris Klein and Jon Bernthal. It also features Ginnifer Goodwin, Sofia Vassilieva, Elisabeth Moss and Ally Sheedy.

== Plot ==
In the future America, the military draft has been reinstated to fight the war on terror. The country's conflicting attitudes toward war are examined through the eyes of Aaron (Elijah Wood), George (Chris Klein), and Dixon (Jon Bernthal). The three friends have been given induction notices and have 30 days to report for duty.

Feeling unprepared but convinced that he must serve, novelist Aaron embarks on a quest to prepare for the life of a soldier — enlisting the help of a collapsing Bowflex machine and a disengaged therapist (Ally Sheedy).

Corporate attorney George wishes to stay with his wife (Ginnifer Goodwin), a recent cancer survivor, rather than fight in a war that he believes is wrong. He spends much of his 30 days researching ways he can dodge the draft, but avoiding service does not prove easy.

Cab driver Dixon is the most fearless and free of doubt, but he falls in love with a sociology student (Elisabeth Moss), and suddenly issues that always seemed black-and-white to him are not so simple.

As reporting day, or day zero, draws nearer, the three friends fight, fall out, come together and comfort each other as each in his own way discovers what it means to "serve with honor."

== Cast ==
- Elijah Wood as Aaron Feller
- Chris Klein as George Rifkin
- Jon Bernthal as James Dixon
- Ginnifer Goodwin as Molly Rifkin
- Ally Sheedy as Dr. Reynolds
- Adam LeFevre as Client
- Elisabeth Moss as Patricia
- Sofia Vassilieva as Mara
- Zoe Lister-Jones as Jessica Hendricks

== Critical reception ==
Day Zero received negative to mixed reviews from critics. As of June 2020, the film holds a 24% approval rating on the review aggregator Rotten Tomatoes, based on 21 reviews with an average rating of 4.24/10. Metacritic reported the film had an average score of 41 out of 100, based on 5 reviews.
