= Don Zolidis =

American playwright and author

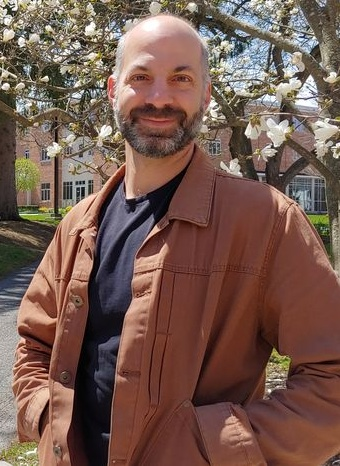
Zolidis in 2024

Don Zolidis is an American playwright and author.

== Early life and education ==
Zolidis grew up in Janesville, Wisconsin. He received a BA in English from Carleton College and an MFA in Playwriting from the Actor's Studio Program at the New School.

== Career ==
After graduating, Zolidis worked as a middle and high school teacher. He wrote plays in his free time, and his students were the original performers of multiple of his published works. Eventually he shifted to working full-time as a writer and playwright.

Zolidis' plays are among the most-produced plays in American high schools. He has published over 140 plays, with over 25,000 productions in more than 80 countries.

== Awards and honors ==
In 2004, Zolidis received the Princess Grace Award in Playwriting.

== Publications ==
=== Novels ===
- War and Speech (2020)
- The Seven Torments of Amy and Craig (A Love Story) (2018)

=== Plays (selected) ===
- 10 Ways to Survive the Zombie Apocalypse
- The Cryptid Survival Guide
- Emily Bronte, Teenage Necromancer
- Ghosted
- Haters
- The Job Interview
- Plot Armor
- Silent But Deadly
- When are the Robots Coming to Kill Us?
- White Buffalo
- The Election
- Monster
