= James Badge Dale =

American actor (born 1978)

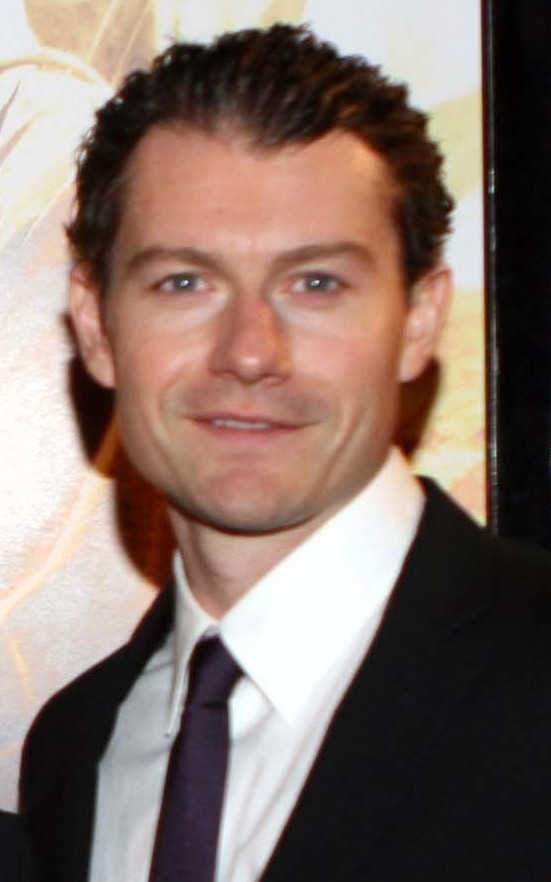
- Dale in February 2010
- Born: James Badgett Dale; May 1, 1978 (age 48); New York City, New York, U.S.
- Occupation: Actor
- Years active: 1988–present
- Spouse: Emily Wickersham (m. 2024)
- Children: 2
- Relatives: Anita Morris (mother); Grover Dale (father)

James Badge Dale (born James Badgett Dale, May 1, 1978) is an American actor. Frequently cast as law enforcement and military characters, he is known for his roles as Chase Edmunds in 24, Robert Leckie in The Pacific, Trooper Barrigan in The Departed, Luke Lewenden in The Grey, Eric Savin in Iron Man 3, and Tyrone S. "Rone" Woods in 13 Hours.

== Early life ==
James Badgett Dale was born in the New York City borough of Manhattan on May 1, 1978, the only child of actress/singer Anita Morris (1943–1994) and actor/dancer Grover Dale (born 1935). He was educated at Wonderland Avenue Elementary School in the Laurel Canyon neighborhood of Los Angeles. At the age of 10, he was picked out of his fifth grade class to audition for the role of Simon in the 1990 film Lord of the Flies. After gaining the role and spending five months filming on location in Jamaica, he returned to his schooling at Wonderland.

== Career ==
Dale's early notable roles are Simon in the 1990 film Lord of the Flies and Chase Edmunds in the third season of the Fox series 24 (which he later reprised in 24: The Game). He also appeared in CSI: Miami and CSI: NY as serial killer Henry Darius. In 2006, he played the supporting role of Trooper Barrigan in The Departed. He then was cast as the lead in AMC's political thriller Rubicon which revolves around a secret society that pulls the strings on the world political stage like the alleged Illuminati and the Council on Foreign Relations. It centers on Dale's brilliant analyst Will Travers discovering that his employers are not who they seem to be. He starred as Robert Leckie, one of the three leads in the HBO miniseries The Pacific (2010).

In 2013, Dale played Eric Savin in the Marvel superhero film Iron Man 3, Captain Speke in the science fiction thriller World War Z, Dan Reid in Disney's The Lone Ranger, and the brother of Lee Harvey Oswald in Parkland. In 2014, he starred in an off-Broadway production of Small Engine Repair (and would later appear in a small role in the 2021 film adaptation). He portrayed a firefighter captain in 2017 drama film Only the Brave, and an ex-police militia member in tense thriller The Standoff at Sparrow Creek released the following year. He played the lead as an ex-police officer grieving the loss of his family in the critically acclaimed supernatural horror The Empty Man in 2020.

He played the male lead in Starz series Hightown (2020–2024) as a sex-addicted police detective dealing with the opioid crisis. In 2022, he guest starred in a comedic role in an episode of Hulu's Ramy, and in three episodes of the first series of Paramount+ series 1923. In 2024 he starred in the action film King Ivory, being drawn to the project by the writing. He was cast in a recurring role in the upcoming Apple TV miniseries The Savant. He starred in the 2025 revenge thriller Violent Ends.

== Personal life ==
Dale married actress Emily Wickersham in September 2024. They have a son born in 2021. In October 2024, they had their second child.

== Filmography ==
=== Film ===
Year	Title	Role	Notes
1990	Lord of the Flies	Simon	
2003	Nola	Ben	
2004	Cross Bronx	Rob-O	
2005	The Naked Brothers Band	Romantic Newlywed	
2006	The Departed	Barrigan	
2010	NoNAMES	Kevin	
2010	Polish Bar	Tommy	
2011	Shame	David	
2011	The Conspirator	William Hamilton	
2012	The Grey	Luke Lewenden	
2012	Flight	Gaunt Young Man	
2013	Iron Man 3	Eric Savin	
2013	World War Z	Captain Speke	
2013	The Lone Ranger	Dan Reid	
2013	Parkland	Robert Oswald	
2014	Miss Meadows	Sheriff	
2014	Stretch	Laurent	
2015	Echoes of War	Wade	
2015	The Walk	Jean-Pierre	
2016	13 Hours	Tyrone S. "Rone" Woods	
2016	Spectral	Dr. Mark Clyne	
2017	Only the Brave	Jesse Steed	
2018	Little Woods	Ian	
2018	Donnybrook	Whalen	
2018	The Standoff at Sparrow Creek	Gannon	
2018	Hold the Dark	Donald Marium	
2019	Mickey and the Bear	Hank Peck	
2019	Into the Ashes	Sal Porter	
2019	The Kitchen	Kevin O'Carroll	
2020	The Empty Man	James Lasombra	
2020	Safety	Coach Simmons	
2021	Small Engine Repair	Badge	
2021	On Our Way	Henry's Father	
2024	King Ivory	Layne West	
2025	On the End	John Finch	
2025	Violent Ends	Sid Frost	
2027	Slayground		Post-production

=== Television ===
Year	Title	Role	Notes
2002	Law & Order: Special Victims Unit	Danny Jordan	Episode: "Competence"
2003–2004	24	Chase Edmunds	24 episodes; Nominated for Outstanding Ensemble at the 11th Screen Actors Guild Awards
2003	Hack	Billy Ryan	Episode: "Third Strike"
2004	Rescue Me	Timo Gavin	3 episodes
2005	CSI: Crime Scene Investigation	Adam Trent	Episode: "Committed"
2005	CSI: Miami	Henry Darius	Episode: "Felony Flight"
2005	CSI: NY	Henry Darius	Episode: "Manhattan Manhunt"
2007	The Black Donnellys	Samson Dawlish	6 episodes
2007	Fort Pit	Bobby Bonelli	TV movie
2010	The Pacific	Robert Leckie	7 episodes; Nominated as an ensemble for Outstanding Performance in a TV Movie or Miniseries at the 2011 Prism Awards
2010	Rubicon	Will Travers	13 episodes
2020–2024	Hightown	Ray Abruzzo	25 episodes
2022	Ramy	Sheikh Abu Bakar Miller	Episode: "Merchants in Medina"
2022	1923	John Dutton Sr.	Recurring role; miniseries
2025	Devil in Disguise: John Wayne Gacy	Joe Kozenczak	8 episodes
2026	Law & Order	Detective Rob Calvino	
2027	The Savant	Keith Messier	Miniseries

=== Video games ===
Year	Title	Role	Notes
2006	24: The Game	Chase Edmunds	
2026	Grand Theft Auto VI	The Local Population	
