= Hammaad Chaudry =

Scottish playwright

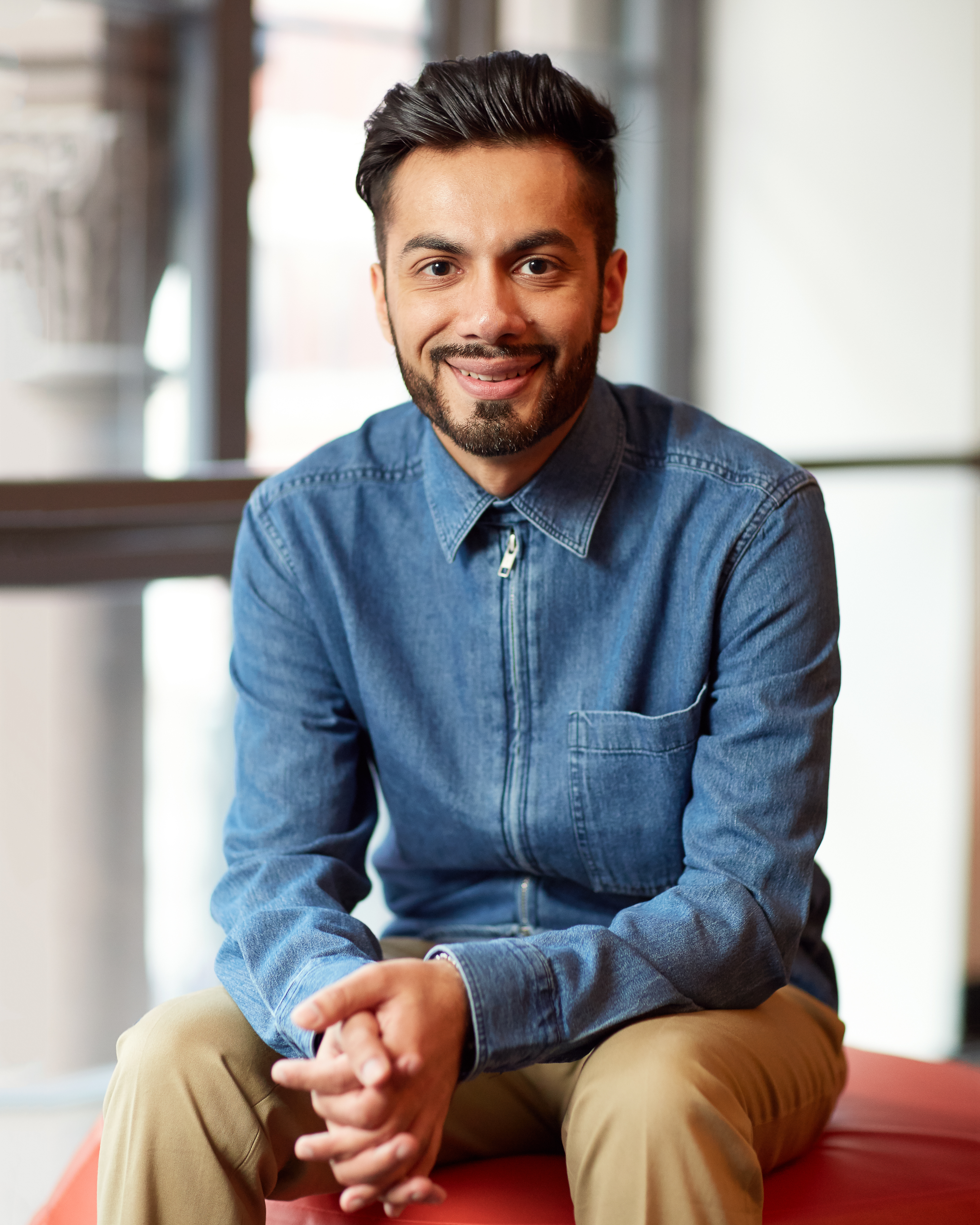
- Education: Master of Fine Arts
- Alma mater: Columbia University; University of Surrey
- Occupation: Playwright
- Website: Official website

Hammaad Chaudry (born 1987) is a playwright and screenwriter born in Edinburgh, Scotland. His professional debut was with the play An Ordinary Muslim at New York Theatre Workshop. His plays have been produced in the United States and the United Kingdom. He also currently writes for television and film. He completed his MFA at Columbia University on a university scholarship and trained at the Royal Court Theatre in London. The New York Times highlighted Chaudry as one young people to watch in theater and YesBroadway selected him as one of their 40 under 40.

== Early life and education ==
Hammaad Chaudry is the son of Pakistani immigrants born in the historically working class district of Leith in Edinburgh, Scotland, where he was educated at state schools. At the age of 19, Chaudry moved away from home to initially study law at the University of Surrey, an hour outside London.

In 2008, the Royal Court Theatre in London selected Chaudry for a playwriting programme that focused on Muslim writers. At the age of 20, Chaudry wrote his first play, Salaam Mr Bush, an Iraq War satirical drama, for which he worked with Royal Court Associate and director Sacha Wares.

Chaudry's first play won the theatre's Unheard Voices competition. Salaam, Mr Bush went on to be the selected for the wider, national competition, the Royal Court's 2009 Young Writers Festival and was staged at the theatre as part of that festival.^{13} He continued writing new plays with the theatre and after a few years Chaudry graduated from the Royal Court Theatre's Young Writers Programme that was led by Leo Butler.

During his undergraduate studies at the University of Surrey, after studying law, Chaudry shifted the focus of his studies to International Politics and History. His final year dissertation focused on traditional and reformist interpretations amongst Muslims, in light of modern post-colonial movements in the latter half of the twentieth century.

After graduating from University Surrey in England, Chaudry was not able to find further opportunities as a writer in the U.K. This led to Chaudry emigrating to the United States where he went on to study for an MFA in Playwriting at Columbia University in the City of New York, completing his studies on a university scholarship.

Here his teachers included Anne Bogart, Charles L. Mee and Tony Award winning Broadway director Gregory Mosher. Mosher taught Chaudry the text Aristotle's Poetics, seeing if the theories proposed in Poetics can be applied to historical and modern plays.

In Chaudry's final year, he was introduced to Tony Kushner who became his mentor. The New York Times reported that, “the Pulitzer Prize-winning writer Tony Kushner took Mr. Chaudry under his wing”. This included mentoring Chaudry in developing his writing craft and directing readings of Chaudry's work.

== Career ==
Shortly after his graduation from Columbia University, Chaudry was awarded the Van Lier Fellowship at New Dramatists in New York, the writing center that has been described as the “nexus of the American Theatre”, past residents include James Baldwin.His time at New Dramatists included a two year residency and professional readings of Chaudry's work. That same year Chaudry received the New Playwrights Award from Playwrights’ Studio Scotland.

He then became a part of The Public Theater's Emerging Writers group in 2016, the theater that

is best known for producing the musical Hamilton.The Public Theater would go on to commission Chaudry for new work. He has also been commissioned by the Kiln Theatre in London and the Traverse Theatre in Edinburgh, Scotland.

Chaudry initially developed An Ordinary Muslim as his thesis play at Columbia University with Tony Kushner directing two readings of the play in 2014, Kushner continued his mentorship of Chaudry and the play over the next four years as the play opened in 2018. An Ordinary Muslim had its world premiere at the New York Theatre Workshop, directed by Obie winner Jo Bonney, with costume design by Tony Award winner Susan Hilferty and set design by Neil Patel.

The play tells the story of a British Asian Muslim family called the Bhattis based in West London, and their son Azeem Bhatti, who lies to his family about a great job he does not have, while navigating different cultural worlds. The play also explored the experience of the Bhatti family being South Asian and Muslim in modern day Britain.

The play was selected as New York Magazine Critics’ Pick, offering the insight, “Potent...An Ordinary Muslim is its playwright's professional debut, and it's an impressive one. The play feels solid, nurtured, strong boned. It participates in a long tradition of Unhappy Family drama, from Long Day's Journey Into Night to August: Osage County”.The Financial Times called the play “rich and complex” giving it four stars out of five. Critic Saima Huq described the play as “extraordinary theatre”, and lead critic of The Wrap, Robert Hofler, headlined his review, “Riveting...Hammaad Chaudry is no ordinary playwright”.

The play received many awards including the Edgerton Foundation New Play Award. Chaudry himself was awarded the Tow Foundation Residency. An Ordinary Muslim was extended by two weeks due to popular demand. Brooklyn based filmmaker and cinematographer Omar Mullick filmed a featurette for the play.

In 2023, the theatre historian Carol Rocamora published her latest work on theatre history, titled CRISIS: The Theatre Responds. Rocamora highlighted the most important plays of the past hundred years that respond to “urgent issues of our time”. Rocamora selected An Ordinary Muslim as one of those plays. Rocamora drew comparisons between Chaudry's work and the work of Arthur Miller.

Since 2019, Chaudry has been working as a screenwriter. He has worked with Film4 Productions and was commissioned to by Tiger Aspect Productions to write an original TV Pilot. He has also written for prime time shows on ITV Network. Internationally, he wrote a feature length screenplay for Dubai based MBC Studios, the largest film studio in the Middle East and North Africa.

In 2020, the Royal Lyceum Theatre in the U.K. produced Chaudry's play Bobby & Rabia, directed by Zinnie Harris. The play was given four stars out of five and excerpts of the play were published in The Scotsman. In 2021, the Chicago-based theatre, Kane Repertory Theatre, produced Chaudry's new play titled Security. The production was a first of its kind, a blend of film and theater, that streamed worldwide. The leading role in the play was played by Academy Award and three-time Golden Globe nominee Eric Roberts, widely considered a Hollywood veteran.

Reviewers described the play Security as “echoing the ongoing struggle between Empire and Colony”.The play received five-out-of-five-star reviews from Chicago papers such as Around The Town Chicago. New City Stage called it an “intelligent and thought-provoking script” and reviewer Anna Hessel described it as “a powerful production, realistic and thought-provoking”.

In 2022 Chaudry was on attachment to the Royal Lyceum Theatre in Scotland, where he worked with the artistic director and playwright David Greig. Chaudry's new work was staged at the theatre as part of their Wonder Festival in that same year.

Hammaad Chaudry has received extensive media coverage for his work with profiles and interviews in The New York Times, NPR, The Daily Beast, The Guardian, Theatre Development Fund, TheatreMania, BroadwayRadio, StageBuddy and The Scotsman.

His plays are published by Samuel French, Inc. He has lectured at universities in the United States and the United Kingdom, including University of Cambridge in England. He has been the recipient of numerous awards and residencies.

== List of plays ==
- Security
- Bobby & Rabia
- An Ordinary Muslim
- Kismat
- God Willing
- Salaam, Mr Bush
