= Back Stage Garland Awards =

Award

- Awarded for: Excellence in Southern California theatre.
- Location: Los Angeles, California
- Country: United States
- Presented by: Backstage
- First award: 1998
- Final award: 2009

The Back Stage Garland Awards — also referred to simply as the Garland Awards, and known as the Back Stage West Garland Awards from 1998 to 2008 — were bestowed by the entertainment-industry newspaper Backstage, honoring excellence in Southern California theatre. The awards recognize many different types of contributors to theatre, including actors, directors, producers, prop makers, set designers, costume designers, and choreographers.

== Selection process ==
Award winners are selected through a process voted on by theatre critics in the industry. Each Garland winner has appeared on at least three critics' "Best of" lists for the previous year. Critics are each allowed to name "up to five nominees for each category except performance, up to 10 nominees for performance in a musical production and up to 10 in straight productions." Each winner is presented with a "Garland statuette" in the year following their recognized production.

== History ==
The first awards were presented on January 12, 1998, with eighty individuals recognized, and the next year's ceremony recognized one hundred and fifty people. The first ceremony was held at the Coronet Theatre in Los Angeles, California, and awards in the following two years were presented in a ceremony at the Geffen Playhouse in Westwood, Los Angeles, California. Two hundred and seventy stage artists and theatre supporters attended the first annual awards. Awards categories in the first year included production, performance, ensemble cast, sound design, costume, lighting design, set design, musical score, and choreography. Pacific Resident Theatre in Venice, California was recognized with a special award for "continued excellence." Presenters at the first annual awards included Daniel Henning, artistic director for the Blank Theatre Company, and actor Noah Wyle, who had just joined Blank Theatre Company as artistic producer. David Schwimmer spoke on behalf of the Chicago, Illinois-based company he co-founded, Lookingglass Theatre Company, and accepted awards for their production of Arabian Nights. Ian McKellen was also honored at the ceremony for his one-man show, A Knight Out in Los Angeles. The first annual Garland Awards were dedicated to actor Charles Hallahan, a member of the Matrix Theatre Company who died in 1997.

Though the first year's awards focused mainly on the production of Ragtime, the second annual awards, held on January 25, 1999, focused on many different contributors in the industry. Actress Carol Burnett was the first honoree and presenter at the second annual awards. Prizes in the second year were awarded for production, performance, writing, musical score, choreography, direction, and design. The comedy-drama Elephant Sighs won the Garland Award for best new play of 1998. The third annual awards ceremony in 2000 ran for two and a half hours, and one hundred and ten individuals were recognized. Well-known songs were played at the awards ceremony in a sing-along fashion, including "Somewhere Over the Rainbow" and pieces from West Side Story and Hedwig and the Angry Inch.

Heroes star David Anders was among an ensemble cast of The Diary of Anne Frank honored with a Garland Award for its 2001 production. The ninth annual awards ceremony was held at the Bootleg Theatre in Los Angeles on March 26, 2007. Over 175 guests attended the event, which honored 2006 productions and theatre contributors including Salome Jens, who won a performance award for Leipzig, and actor-singer Camille Saviola for her role in Zorba. Music director Gerald Sternbach, honored for his direction of Zorba, stated his appreciation of the Garland Awards: "What's wonderful about the Garlands is it's unpretentious. At other things there is a lot of tension, but really, this isn't a ceremony, it's a party. It's a supportive environment where everyone gets to hang."

== See also ==
- Drama Desk Awards
- Drama-Logue Awards
- LA Weekly Theater Awards
- Obie Award
- Ovation Awards
- Tony Awards
