= Ignacio Diaz-Silverio =

American actor

- Born: Tampa, Florida, U.S.
- Occupation: Actor
- Years active: 2021-present

Ignacio Diaz-Silverio is an American actor. He is best known for starring as Rafa in the Amazon Freevee comedy series Primo (2023), a role that earned him the Imagen Award for Best Actor in a Comedy Series.

== Early life ==
Diaz-Silverio was born in Tampa, Florida and grew up in Tallahassee, Florida. As a child, he spent two years living in San Antonio, Texas, an experience he later drew on while filming Primo in the same city.

== Career ==
Diaz-Silverio's early television work included guest appearances on the CBS drama The Good Fight and the Apple TV+ series Suspicion. In 2022, he made his stage debut originating the role of Mason Adams in the world premiere of Kimberly Belflower's play John Proctor Is the Villain at Studio Theatre in Washington, D.C.. The following year, he made his off-Broadway debut in a production of Samuel D. Hunter's A Bright New Boise at Signature Theatre. His performance in the former earned him a nomination for the Helen Hayes Award for Outstanding Supporting Performer in a Play in 2023.

He made his film debut in 2023 as Quinn in Zach Braff's drama A Good Person, starring alongside Florence Pugh and Morgan Freeman. That same year, he played the lead role of Rafa, a teenager based on series creator Shea Serrano, in the Amazon Freevee sitcom Primo, co-executive produced by Michael Schur. The performance led TV Insider to name him one of its Breakout TV Stars of 2023, and he won the 2024 Imagen Award for Best Actor in a Comedy Series for the role.

Diaz-Silverio also starred as Javier, a bullied high school senior, in the slasher-comedy film Departing Seniors (2024). He appeared in the Green Day-inspired coming-of-age comedy Nimrods (2025) and starred in the independent comedy Youthful Pleasures (2025). He has also had guest roles on Zero Day, Law & Order: SVU, and FBI. In 2026, he was cast as a series regular in the NBC comedy Newlyweds, playing Lolo opposite Tea Leoni, Tim Daly, and Jamie Lee Curtis.

== Filmography ==
=== Film ===
Key
†	Denotes films that have not yet been released

Year	Title	Role	Notes
2023	A Good Person	Quinn	
2023	Departing Seniors	Javier	
2025	Nimrods	Keith	
TBA	52nd State †		Post-production
TBA	Young Men †	Trav	Post-production
TBA	Youthful Pleasures †	Liam	Post-production

=== Television ===
Year	Title	Role	Notes
2021	The Good Fight	Andres	Episode: "And the End Was Violent..."
2022	Suspicion	Protestor 2	Episode: "Questions of Trust"
2023	Primo	Rafa	Lead role
2024	FBI	Fernando Perez, Jr.	Episode: "Détente"
2025	Zero Day	Cesar Rocha	Miniseries; 3 episodes
2026	Law & Order: Special Victims Unit	Ethan Weiss	Episode: "Impropriety"
2026–present	Newlyweds	Lolo	Main role

=== Stage ===
Year	Title	Role	Venue	Notes
2022	John Proctor Is the Villain	Mason Adams	Studio Theatre	World premiere
2023	A Bright New Boise	Alex	Signature Theatre	Off-Broadway

== Awards and nominations ==
Year	Award	Category	Work	Result	Ref.
2023	Helen Hayes Awards	Outstanding Supporting Performer in a Play	John Proctor is the Villain	Nominated	
2024	Imagen Awards	Best Actor – Comedy (Television)	Primo	Won	
