= Amalia Yoo =

American actress (born 2002)

- Yoo at the Opening Night of John Proctor Is the Villain on Broadway
- Born: Amalia Yoo; 2002 (age 23–24)
- Occupation: Actress

Amalia Emma Lola Yoo (born 2002) is an American television, film, and stage actress, best known for her roles as Leila Zimmer in the 2020 television drama Grand Army and as Raelynn Nix in the 2025 Broadway production of John Proctor Is the Villain. Yoo is slated to star as Ilse in a upcoming 2026 Off-Broadway revival of the critically-acclaimed 2006 musical Spring Awakening, directed by Danya Taymor.

== Early life ==
Yoo was born in New York City. Her parents, both teachers, frequently took her to Broadway theatre shows from a young age. She grew up in Battery Park City and attended PS89 for elementary school and the Salk School of Science for middle school where she started to act in commercials. She attended Fiorello H. LaGuardia High School on the Upper West Side of Manhattan, while also taking drama classes at Katie Cappiello's studio GoodCapp Arts beginning in 2016.

== Career ==
Yoo played various roles in stage productions of Cappiello's play Slut while a high school student: first the minor character Jane, and then later the starring role of Joey. After Cappiello began working with Netflix to create a television series inspired by Slut, she arranged for Yoo and some of her other students to audition for roles in the series, overcoming the reluctance of the casting directors as many of the students were not represented by talent agencies at the time. Yoo, who was only sixteen years old when the auditions were being held, did not audition for the role of Joey, as the casting directors sought to have an actress at least eighteen years old fill that role, and so instead she auditioned for the role of Leila Zimmer, an interracial adoptee from China. Her parents accompanied her to Toronto, where Grand Army was partly filmed. She frequently listened to the album Blonde by Frank Ocean as part of her preparation for getting into character. Meghan O'Keefe of Decider praised Yoo for "her uncanny ability to be ruthlessly honest in how some terribly annoying some teens really are" and for balancing the competing demands of helping the audience to understand Leila's character without "absolv[ing] her from incrimination".

Grand Army was cancelled after one season, and Yoo signed with the Agency for the Performing Arts and Luber Roklin Entertainment to seek further roles in film and television. In January 2022, she was cast in a supporting role in the romantic comedy film The Other Zoey. She subsequently played the role of Natalie in the sex comedy No Hard Feelings, released in June 2023.

In early 2025, Yoo performed in the Atlantic Theater Company's production of Eliya Smith's Grief Camp, under director Les Waters. She made her Broadway debut later that year as Raelynn Nix in John Proctor Is the Villain. She won the 2025 Drama Desk Award for Outstanding Featured Performance in a Play for the latter role. She was then cast in Smith's Dad Don't Read This, expected to play at St. Luke's Theatre in May 2026.

== Acting credits ==
=== Film ===
Year	Title	Role(s)	Notes	Ref.
2015	J Doe	Mckayla	Short film	
2023	No Hard Feelings	Natalie		
2023	The Other Zoey	Becca		

=== Television ===
Year	Title	Role(s)	Notes	Ref.
2020	Grand Army	Leila Kwan Zimmer	9 episodes	
2024	Brilliant Minds	Sarah Kim	Episode: "The Girl Who Cried Pregnant"	

=== Theater ===
Year	Title	Role(s)	Playwright	Venue	Ref.
2025	Grief House	Luna	Eliya Smith	Linda Gross Theater, Off-Broadway	
2025	John Proctor Is the Villain	Raelynn Nix	Kimberly Belflower	Booth Theatre, Broadway	
2026	Dad Don't Read This	Mal	Eliya Smith	Greenwich House Theater, Off-Broadway	
2026	Spring Awakening	Ilse	Steven Sater	Studio Seaview, Off-Broadway	

== Awards and nominations ==
Year	Association	Category	Project	Result	Ref.
2025	Drama Desk Award	Outstanding Featured Performance in a Play	John Proctor Is the Villain	Won	
2025	Dorian Award	Outstanding Featured Performance in a Broadway Play	John Proctor Is the Villain	Won	
