= Billy O'Neil =

Billy O'Neil may refer to:

- Billy O'Neil, character in British sports drama television series Dream Team
- Billy O'Neill (disambiguation)

== See also ==
- William O'Neil (disambiguation)
