= Spring Awakening (musical) =

Rock musical

- Original Broadway recording
- Music: Duncan Sheik
- Lyrics: Steven Sater
- Book: Steven Sater
- Basis: Spring Awakening by Frank Wedekind
- Productions: 2006 Off-Broadway; 2006 Broadway; 2008 First US Tour; 2009 West End; 2010 Second US Tour; 2015 Broadway revival 2021 Offie
- Awards: Tony Award for Best Musical; Tony Award for Best Book of a Musical; Tony Award for Best Original Score; Laurence Olivier Award for Best New Musical; Grammy Award for Best Musical Theater Album

Spring Awakening is a coming-of-age rock musical with music by Duncan Sheik and a book and lyrics by Steven Sater. It is based on the 1891 German play Spring Awakening by Frank Wedekind. Set in late 19th-century Germany, the musical tells the story of teenagers discovering the inner and outer tumult of adolescent sexuality. In the musical, alternative rock is employed as part of the folk-infused rock score.

Following its conception in the late 1990s and various workshops, concerts, rewrites and its Off-Broadway debut, the original Broadway production of Spring Awakening opened at the Eugene O'Neill Theatre on December 10, 2006. Its cast included Jonathan Groff, Lea Michele, and John Gallagher Jr. while its creative team comprised director Michael Mayer and choreographer Bill T. Jones. The original Broadway production won eight Tony Awards, including Tonys for Best Musical, Direction, Book, Score and Featured Actor. The production also garnered four Drama Desk Awards, while its original cast album received a Grammy Award. In addition, the show was revived in 2015 on Broadway and garnered three Tony Award nominations, among other honors.

The success of the Broadway production has spawned several other productions worldwide, including various US productions, a West End production that won four Laurence Olivier Awards including Best New Musical, and a series of international productions. In 2022, Spring Awakening: Those You've Known, a documentary film chronicling the 15-year reunion of the original company, was released on HBO.

== Synopsis ==
=== Act I ===
Wendla Bergmann, an adolescent in late 19th-century Germany, laments that her mother gave her "no way to handle things" and has not taught her the lessons she is meant to know as a young woman ("Mama Who Bore Me"). She tells her mother that it is time she learned where babies come from, considering that she is about to be an aunt for the second time. Her mother cannot bring herself to explain the facts about conception clearly to Wendla, despite knowing her daughter is reaching puberty. Instead, she simply tells Wendla that to conceive a child a woman must love her husband with all of her heart. The other young girls in town – Martha, Thea, Anna and Ilse – appear to be similarly naïve and are upset about the lack of knowledge presented to them ("Mama Who Bore Me (Reprise)").

At school, some teenage boys are studying Virgil in Latin class. When Moritz Stiefel, a very nervous and anxious young man, sleepily misquotes a line, the teacher chastises him harshly. Moritz's classmate, the rebellious and highly intelligent Melchior Gabor, tries to defend him, but the teacher will have none of it, and hits Melchior with a stick. Melchior reflects on the shallow narrow-mindedness of school and society and expresses his intent to change things ("All That's Known").

Moritz describes a dream that has been keeping him up at night, and Melchior realizes that Moritz has been having erotic dreams which Moritz believes are signs of insanity. To comfort the panicked Moritz, Melchior, who has learned sexual information from books, tells Moritz that all of the boys at their age get these dreams. Moritz, Melchior and the other boys – Ernst, Hänschen, Otto and Georg – share their own sexually frustrated thoughts and desires ("The Bitch of Living"). Moritz, who is uncomfortable talking about the subject with Melchior, requests that he give him the information in the form of an essay, complete with illustrations.

All the girls, except Ilse, are gathered together after school; they tease each other as they fantasize about marrying the boys in the town. Martha admits that she has a crush on Moritz, but is made fun of by the other girls. At the top of the list is the radical, intelligent, and good-looking Melchior ("My Junk"). Moritz has eagerly digested the essay that Melchior prepared for him, but complains that his new knowledge has only made his dreams even more vivid and torturous. Melchior tries to calm and comfort his friend, but Moritz runs off in frustration. All of the boys and girls express their desires for physical intimacy ("Touch Me").

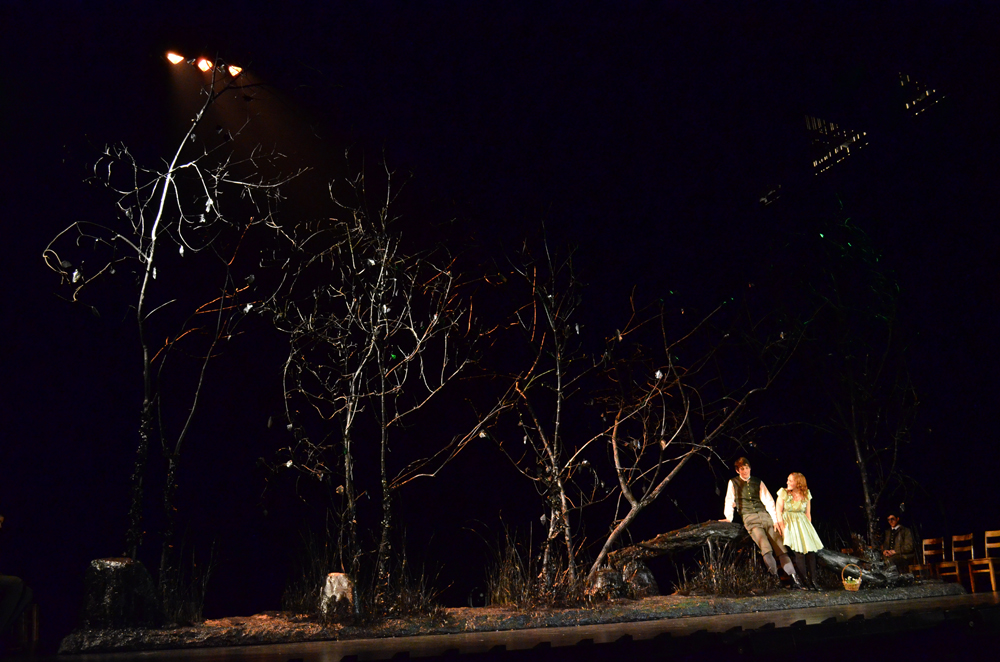
"The Word of Your Body" from Carnegie Mellon University's 2013 production of Spring Awakening

While searching for flowers for her mother, Wendla stumbles upon Melchior. The two reminisce on the friendship they once shared as children and share a moment while sitting together in front of a tree. Each of them considers what it would be like to give in to their physical desires for one another ("The Word of Your Body"), but they do not do so. Meanwhile, at school, Moritz sneaks a look at his test results and is thrilled to learn that he has passed his midterm examinations, and tells the other boys. They are ecstatic, save the skeptical Hänschen. However, the teacher and schoolmaster, who claim they cannot pass everyone, decide to fail Moritz anyway, deeming his passing grade still not up to the school's lofty standards.

Martha accidentally admits to her friends that her father abuses her physically and sexually and that her mother is either oblivious or uncaring. The other girls are horrified to hear this, but Martha makes them promise not to tell anyone, lest she end up like Ilse, a friend from childhood who now wanders homeless and aimless after her similarly abusive parents kicked her out of the house ("The Dark I Know Well"). Later, Wendla finds Melchior again at his spot in the woods and tells him about Martha's abuse. Melchior is appalled to hear this, but Wendla convinces him to hit her with a switch, so that she can try to understand Martha's pain. At first Melchior is determined to do nothing of the sort, but reluctantly complies. He gets carried away in the beating, taking his own frustrations out on Wendla and throws her to the ground. Disgusted with himself, Melchior runs off as Wendla is left lying on the ground, weeping. Alone, Wendla finds that Melchior has left his journal on the ground. She picks it up and takes it with her.

Moritz is told he has failed his final examination; when Moritz tells his father that he will not be progressing in school, he reacts with disdain and contempt. Rather than attempting to understand his son's pain, his father is only concerned with how the others in town will react when they see "the man with the son who failed." Moritz writes to Melchior's mother, his only adult friend, asking for money to help him flee to America; she tenderly but firmly denies his request and promises to write his parents to discourage them from being too hard on him ("And Then There Were None"). Devastated by her refusal and feeling he has few choices left, Moritz considers killing himself.

In a stuffy hayloft during a storm, Melchior expresses his frustration about being caught between childhood and adulthood ("The Mirror-Blue Night"). Wendla finds him once again, telling him she wants to return his journal, and each apologizes for what happened in the forest. Melchior, disappointed in himself from the night before, urges her to leave. Wendla ignores this, instead suggesting they run in the rain until they "get soaked to the skin". Before long, they begin to kiss. Both of them nervously continue to entangle themselves, and then hesitate, sensing that what they are doing is something very powerful. Wendla is not entirely sure of what they are about to do but is certain that it is unlike anything that she has known before. They continue and then have sex in the hayloft; as Melchior penetrates her, Wendla cries out ("I Believe"). (Note: This scene was softened from the show's Off-Broadway run, where consent from Wendla was unclear and stage notes suggest explicit rape. Later, as staged by the Broadway show, Wendla gives explicit consent to Melchior, but does so without full understanding of what they are going to do.)

=== Act II ===
Wendla and Melchior are finishing their moment of confused intimacy in the hayloft; they reflect on and discuss what has just happened ("The Guilty Ones"). (In the Off-Broadway production, Act II began with "There Once Was a Pirate".)

Moritz, having been thrown out of his home, wanders the town at dusk, carrying a pistol when he comes across Ilse, a childhood friend of his. Ilse tells him she has found refuge at an artists' colony, and they reminisce in some childhood memories and "remarkable times". She invites him to come home with her and join her in sharing some more childhood memories, and maybe something more. Moritz refuses and Ilse does everything she can to change his mind ("Don't Do Sadness/Blue Wind"). After affirming to Ilse that he truly wished he could go with her, Moritz refuses and Ilse leaves, distraught and upset. Realizing that Ilse was his last chance to escape the fate he's set out for himself, Moritz quickly changes his mind and calls after her, but she is gone. Alone and believing that he has nowhere to turn, Moritz shoots himself.

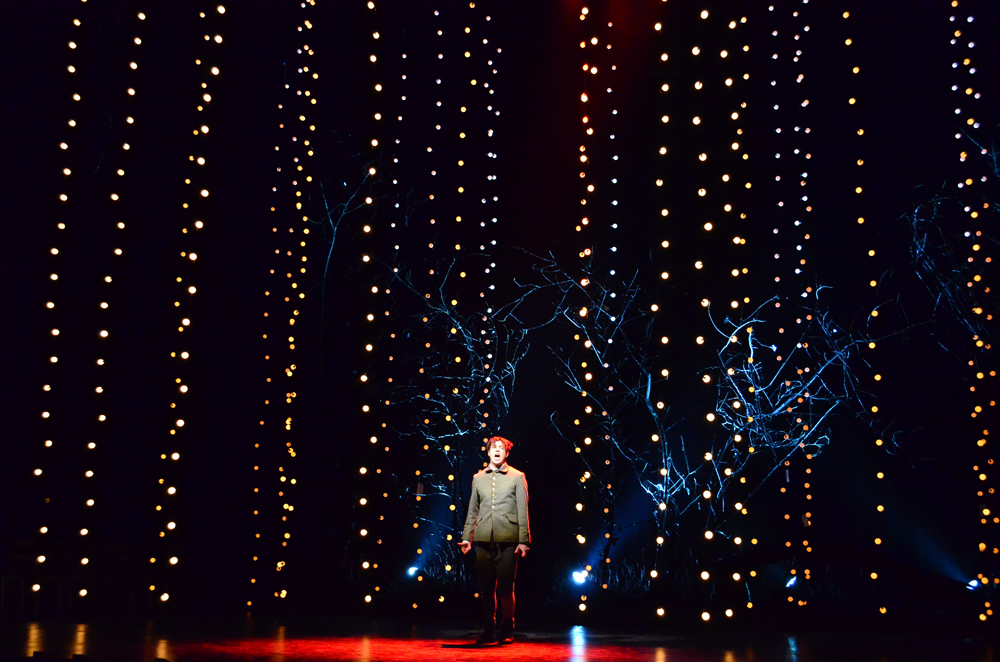
"Don't Do Sadness" from Carnegie Mellon University's 2013 production of Spring Awakening

At Moritz's funeral, each of the children drops a flower into his grave as Melchior laments the passing of his friend while touching on the factors that led to his death, including the way his parents treated him ("Left Behind").

Back at school, the schoolmaster and teacher feel the need to call attention away from Moritz, whose death was a direct result of their actions. They search through Moritz's belongings and find the essay on sex which Melchior wrote for him. They seize the opportunity to lay the blame of Moritz's death on Melchior, and although Melchior knows that he is not to blame, he knows there is nothing he can do to fight them and is expelled as a result ("Totally Fucked").

Elsewhere that night, Hänschen meets up with his shy and delicate classmate Ernst. Ernst tells Hänschen about his plans to become a pastor after school, and Hänschen shares his pragmatic outlook on life. He is amazed with how Ernst has remained so innocent despite the horrible things happening around them. They kiss and Ernst reveals that he loves Hänschen. ("The Word of Your Body (Reprise)").

Wendla has become ill, and her mother takes her to visit a doctor. He gives her some medication and assures them both that Wendla is suffering from anemia and will be fine, but takes Wendla's mother aside and tells her that Wendla is pregnant. When her mother confronts her with this information, Wendla is completely shocked, not understanding how it could have happened. She realizes that her mother lied to her about how babies are made. Although she berates her mother for leaving her ignorant, her mother rejects the guilt and insists Wendla tell her who the child's father is. Wendla reluctantly surrenders a passionate note Melchior sent her after they consummated their relationship. She reflects somberly on her current condition and the circumstances that precipitated it, but resolves with optimism about her future child ("Whispering").

The 2018 production of Spring Awakening at the University of Kansas (Lawrence, KS).

Meanwhile, Melchior's parents argue about their son's fate; his mother does not believe that the essay he wrote for Moritz is sufficient reason to send him away to reform school. When Melchior's father (Callum) tells his wife about Wendla's pregnancy, she finally agrees that they must send Melchior away, which they do without telling him that Wendla is pregnant.

During this time, Melchior and Wendla keep contact through letters, delivered by Ilse. At the reform school, Melchior gets into a fight with some boys who grab a letter he has just received from Wendla and use it in a masturbation game. As one of the boys reads from the letter, Melchior finally learns about Wendla and their child, and he escapes from the institution to find her. Meanwhile, a very terrified and clueless Wendla is taken to a back-alley abortionist by her mother.

When Melchior reaches town after a few days, he sends a message to Ilse, asking her to have Wendla meet him at the cemetery at midnight. Ilse, however, can take no action, as Melchior "hasn't heard" about Wendla. She shows Anna, Martha, and Thea the letter. They are equally horrified, and decide not to tell Melchior what has happened. At the cemetery, Melchior stumbles across Moritz's grave and swears to himself that he and Wendla will raise their child in a compassionate and open environment. When Wendla doesn't show up for their meeting, Melchior begins to feel a little uneasy. Looking around, Melchior sees a fresh grave he had not noticed before. He reads the name on the stone – Wendla's – and realizes that Wendla has died after a botched abortion. Overwhelmed by shock and grief, he takes out a razor with intent to kill himself. Moritz's and Wendla's spirits rise from their graves to offer him strength. They persuade him to journey on, and he resolves to live and to carry their memories with him forever ("Those You've Known").

Led by Ilse, everyone assembles onstage to sing about how although the adults may still call the shots with their uptight views, they will not last forever, and the seeds are already being planted for a new, more open-minded and informed generation ("The Song of Purple Summer").

== Characters ==
=== The children ===
- Melchior Gabor – An intelligent schoolboy with radical ideals who falls in love with Wendla.
- Wendla Bergmann – An innocent, curious girl who has a relationship with Melchior.
- Moritz Stiefel – Melchior's best friend. He is tormented by growing up and feelings of failure.
- Ilse Neumann – A friend of the other children who was kicked out of an abusive home and now lives in an artists' colony.
- Hänschen Rilow – An intelligent and bisexual schoolboy. Ernst's love interest.
- Martha Bessell – A friend of Wendla's who is abused by her father. She has a crush on Moritz.
- Ernst Röbel – A closeted classmate who is ashamed of his sexuality. He is Hänschen's love interest.
- Georg Zirschnitz – A classmate who lusts after his older piano teacher.
- Otto Lämmermeier – A classmate who has a disturbing dream about his mother.
- Thea – Wendla's best friend. She has a crush on Melchior.
- Anna – Martha's best friend.
- Greta Brandenburg (2015 Broadway revival)
- Bobby Maler (2015 Broadway revival)
- Melitta – Thea's twin sister. (2015 Broadway revival)

=== Boys in the reformatory ===
- Dieter – Usually played by the same actor as Georg
- Rupert – Usually played by the same actor as Hänschen
- Reinhold – Usually played by the same actor as Ernst
- Ulbrecht – Usually played by the same actor as Otto

=== Adults ===
Traditionally, the roles of all the adults are performed by one man and one woman. However, in the 2015 Broadway revival, there were two pairs of adults: one hearing pair, and one deaf/HoH pair.

- Frau Bergmann – Wendla's mother
- Fanny Gabor – Melchior's mother
- Frau Bessell – Martha's mother
- Fräulein Großebüstenhalter – Georg's piano teacher
- Fräulein Knuppeldick – an associate of Headmaster Knochenbruch
- Headmaster Knochenbruch – the boys' school headmaster
- Herr Sonnenstich – a schoolteacher
- Herr Gabor – Melchior's father
- Herr Stiefel – Moritz's father
- Herr Rilow – Hanschen's father
- Herr Neumann – Ilse's Father
- Father Kaulbach – a priest
- Doctor von Brausepulver – Visits Wendla during her pregnancy
- Schmidt – the abortionist

== Musical numbers ==
Act I

- "Mama Who Bore Me" – Wendla
- "Mama Who Bore Me" (Reprise) – Girls
- "All That's Known" – Melchior
- "The Bitch of Living" – Boys
- "My Junk" – Boys and Girls (except Ilse)
- "Touch Me" – Boys and Girls
- "The Word of Your Body" – Wendla and Melchior
- "The Dark I Know Well" – Martha, Ilse, Boys
- "And Then There Were None" – Moritz and Boys
- "The Mirror-Blue Night" – Melchior and Boys
- "I Believe" – Boys and Girls

Act II

- "The Guilty Ones" – Wendla, Melchior, Boys, and Girls
- "Don't Do Sadness/Blue Wind" – Moritz and Ilse
- "Left Behind" – Melchior, Boys, and Girls
- "Totally Fucked" – Melchior and Full Company (except Moritz)
- "The Word of Your Body" (Reprise) – Hänschen, Ernst, Boys (except Moritz), and Girls
- "Whispering" – Wendla
- "Those You've Known" – Moritz, Wendla, and Melchior
- "The Song of Purple Summer" – Ilse and Full Company

Note: "The Guilty Ones" replaced off-Broadway version's Act II opening, "There Once Was a Pirate"; the latter is available as a bonus track sung by composer Duncan Sheik on the iTunes version of the original Broadway cast recording. A reprise of "Touch Me," sung by Melchior, appeared in "Whispering" during the Chicago, Vienna, London runs, was added to the tour, and is part of the amateur rental materials. On the original Broadway cast recording CD, the order of "The Guilty Ones" and "Don't Do Sadness/Blue Wind" is switched. The 2021/22 London run re-introduced "There Once Was a Pirate", in place of "The Guilty Ones".

Orchestration

The original Broadway pit consisted of a 7-piece orchestra:

- Strings: 1 guitar/violin, 1 viola, 1 cello, 1 bass, 1 guitar
- Keyboard: 1 player
- Percussion: 1 player

== Major production casts ==
Character	Off-Broadway	Broadway	North American Tour	London	Broadway Revival	London Revival	Off-Broadway Revival
Character	2006		2008	2009	2015	2021	2026
Melchior	Jonathan Groff	Jonathan Groff	Kyle Riabko	Aneurin Barnard	Austin P. McKenzie	Laurie Kynaston	Tyler Jordan Wesley
Wendla	Lea Michele	Lea Michele	Christy Altomare	Charlotte Wakefield	Sandra Mae Frank; Katie Boeck (voice/guitar)^{a}	Amara Okereke	Ashlyn Maddox
Moritz	John Gallagher Jr.	John Gallagher Jr.	Blake Bashoff	Iwan Rheon	Daniel N. Durant; Alex Boniello (voice/guitar)^{a}	Stuart Thompson	Ryo Kamibayashi
Ilse	Lauren Pritchard	Lauren Pritchard	Steffi DiDomenicantonio	Lucy May Barker	Krysta Rodriguez	Carly-Sophia Davies	Amalia Yoo
Hänschen	Jonathan B. Wright	Jonathan B. Wright	Andy Mientus	Jamie Blackley	Andy Mientus	Nathan Armarkwei-Laryea	Antonio Porciello
Martha	Lilli Cooper	Lilli Cooper	Sarah Hunt	Hayley Gallivan	Treshelle Edmond; Kathryn Gallagher (voice/guitar)^{a}	Bella Maclean	Khadija Sankoh
Ernst	Gideon Glick	Gideon Glick	Ben Moss	Harry McEntire	Joshua Castille; Daniel David Stewart (voice/piano)^{a}	Zheng Xi Yong	Leif Coomer
Adult men	Frank Wood	Stephen Spinella	Henry Stram	Richard Cordery	Russell Harvard; Patrick Page	Mark Lockyer	George Abud
Adult women	Mary McCann	Christine Estabrook	Angela Reed	Sian Thomas	Marlee Matlin; Camryn Manheim	Catherine Cusack	Lilli Cooper
Georg	Skylar Astin	Skylar Astin	Matt Shingledecker	Jos Slovick	Alex Wyse	Joe Pitts	Jack Bateman
Otto	Brian Charles Johnson	Brian Charles Johnson	Anthony Lee Medina	Edd Judge	Miles Barbee; Sean Grandillo (voice/bass)^{a}	Kit Esuruoso	Nando Morland
Anna	Phoebe Strole	Phoebe Strole	Gabrielle Garza	Natasha Barnes	Ali Stroker	Maia Tamrakar	Grace Slear
Thea	Remy Zaken	Remy Zaken	Kimiko Glenn	Evelyn Hoskins	Amelia Hensley; Lauren Luiz (voice/Melitta)^{a}	Asha Banks	Jada Simone Clark
Gretl	N/A	N/A	N/A	N/A	Alexandra Winter (voice/harp)	N/A	N/A

1. This person voiced the lines of a character played by a deaf or hard-of-hearing actor. A new character, Melitta, voiced the character of Thea.

Notable Broadway replacements

- Melchior – Kyle Riabko, Hunter Parrish and Matt Doyle
- Wendla – Alexandra Socha
- Ernst - Blake Daniel
- Ilse - Emma Hunton
- Moritz – Blake Bashoff and Gerard Canonico
- Adult Women – Kate Burton
- Hanschen – Drew Tyler Bell and Matt Doyle
- Anna – Emily Kinney
- Thea – Caitlin Kinnunen
- Ensemble – Jenna Ushkowitz

Notable Broadway swings

- Jennifer Damiano – Anna, Thea, Martha and Ilse
- Krysta Rodriguez – Anna, Thea, Martha, Ilse and Wendla
- Matt Doyle – Hanschen, Ernst, Otto, Georg and Melchior
- Robert Ariza – Melchoir, Hanschen, Georg, Otto

Notable tour replacements

- Melchior – Matt Doyle, Jake Epstein, Christopher Wood
- Moritz – Taylor Trensch

== Original concept ==
Before opening the show off-Broadway, Duncan Sheik had composed an arrangement of song demos for the original concept of Spring Awakening. Back then the musical's plot adhered more closely to the original play's plot. Steven Sater and Duncan Sheik had originally intended for Melchior actually to rape Wendla at the end of "I Believe," but decided to change that plot because he wanted the scene to be more loving between the two characters. In workshops, "I Believe" ended with Wendla's scream while being raped. "All That's Known" replaced a song titled "All Numb". Both songs had the same theme, but because the directors had to reduce time for the show, "All Numb" was cut and replaced with "All That's Known".

A song called "A Comet on Its Way" was replaced by "The Bitch of Living". Although both songs followed the same basic theme, Sheik thought that "The Bitch of Living", being more upbeat, fit the show better. "Those You've Known" replaced a song called "The Clouds Will Drift Away", which was cut because Sheik wanted the song between the three main characters to stay close to the "All That's Known" theme. "Mama Who Bore Me (Reprise)" was originally intended to be performed after "Touch Me". Another song, entitled "Great Sex" (which was intended to be performed after "Mama Who Bore Me (Reprise)"), was also cut from the show because the directors thought the song pointed out the theme of the show too specifically. It was intended to be performed during Hanschen's masturbation scene, but the song was removed and the scene moved into the middle of "My Junk".

== Production history ==
Spring Awakening had a number of workshops, concerts and rewrites over an 8-year period, including workshops at La Jolla Playhouse, San Diego, California, and the Roundabout Theatre Company, and a concert at Lincoln Center in February 2005, under the auspices of actor/producer Tom Hulce. It premiered Off-Broadway at the Atlantic Theater Company on May 19, 2006 and ran through August 5, 2006.

=== Broadway ===
The musical opened on Broadway at the Eugene O'Neill Theatre on December 10, 2006 and closed on January 18, 2009, after 859 performances and 29 previews. It was directed by Michael Mayer with choreography by Bill T. Jones, costume designs by Susan Hilferty, set designs by Christine Jones and lighting by Kevin Adams. It received nearly unanimous favorable reviews, and easily recouped its initial $6 million capitalization, breaking even on August 27, 2007.

Decca Broadway released the original cast recording on December 12, 2006, which won the Grammy Award for Best Musical Show Album in 2008. The guitar on which Sheik composed songs for Spring Awakening was included in the 2008 exhibition "Writing to Character: Songwriters & the Tony Awards" at the New York Public Library for the Performing Arts.

=== United States tours ===
A US national tour (with one stop in Toronto, Ontario, Canada) opened on August 15, 2008 at The Balboa Theatre in San Diego, California. The national tour ended on May 23, 2010 in Orlando, Florida. A non-equity US tour began at Shryock Auditorium on October 14, 2010 in Carbondale, Illinois. The non-equity US tour ended its run on May 15, 2011 in Ottawa, Ontario, Canada at the Centrepointe Theatre.

=== Original London production ===
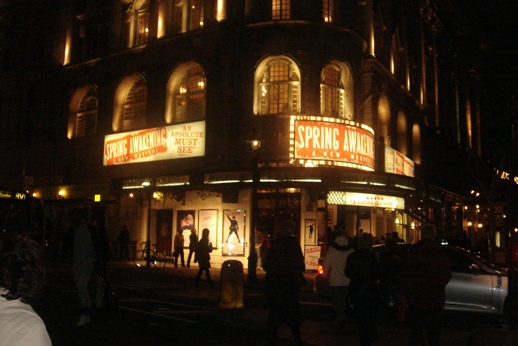
Spring Awakening at London's Novello Theatre, spring 2009

The first London production began January 23, 2009 at the Lyric Hammersmith, transferred to the Novello Theatre on March 21, 2009, and closed on May 30, 2009. It won four Laurence Olivier Awards, including Best New Musical.

=== 2015 Broadway revival ===
Deaf West Theatre mounted a production directed by Michael Arden based on a concept of Arden's husband, first National Tour cast-member Andy Mientus. The cast, made up of both deaf and hearing actors, performed the show in American Sign Language and English simultaneously. The deaf and hard-of-hearing actors in certain roles were paired with a hearing actor who voiced the roles. The majority of the hearing actors were also part of the live onstage band. The production incorporated 19th-century-appropriate aspects of oralism in deaf education to complement the themes of miscommunication, lack of proper sex education, and denial of voice. The production opened in Los Angeles in the fall of 2014 at the Rosenthal Theater produced by Deaf West Theatre Artistic Director DJ Kurs, Christopher Sepulveda and Anne Wareham. When it transferred to the Wallis Annenberg Center for the Performing Arts in Beverly Hills from May to June 2015, Mientus and original Broadway cast swing Krysta Rodriguez played Ilse. The production transferred to Broadway at the Brooks Atkinson Theatre with the same cast, except the addition of Marlee Matlin, Camryn Manheim, Patrick Page, and Russell Harvard in the adult roles. It was produced by Ken Davenport and Cody Lassen. The revival began previews on September 8, 2015 and opened on September 27, 2015. It closed on January 24, 2016.

The production was nominated for the 2016 Tony Award for Best Revival of a Musical and received unanimously positive reviews. In his review for The New York Times, Charles Isherwood called it "a first-rate production of a transporting musical." The Associated Press called it "a sheer triumph," and New York Magazine called it "brilliant and beautiful." The revival focused on making theater and Broadway accessible to people with disabilities. In addition to having deaf cast members, it featured the first Broadway performer to use a wheelchair, Ali Stroker. Spring Awakening was also the first Broadway production to provide interpretation for deaf-blind theatergoers. On January 15, 2016, the producers of Spring Awakening, in association with The Broadway League, presented a symposium titled "How to Make Broadway More Accessible," featuring members of the disability community and a keynote address from Timothy Shriver, chairman of Special Olympics.

=== 2021 London revival ===
A London revival at the Almeida Theatre began previews on 30 November 2021, and opened on 14 December to critical acclaim. Directed by Rupert Goold, choreographed by Lynne Page and designed by Miriam Buether, it was led by Laurie Kynaston as Melchior, Amara Okereke as Wendla and Stuart Thompson as Moritz. The limited run closed, after a week's extension, on 29 January 2022. The production received a 2022 Olivier Award nomination for Best Musical Revival, and won two Critics' Circle Theatre Awards including Best Musical in the same year.

=== 2024 London reunion Concert ===
On 1st February 2024, it was announced that Jack Maple and original London cast member Evelyn Hoskins would present a one night reunion concert on 2nd June 2024 at the Victoria Palace Theatre in London's West End. The concert reunited a majority of the original London cast, band and stage management teams. Changes to the cast included Jamie Muscato (original swing) taking over Melchior, Rich Southgate (another original Swing) as Hanschen and Olivier Award-nominee Jack Wolfe joining the cast as Moritz. The concert raised funds for one of the Original London production's producers, Imogen Kinchin.

=== 2026 Off-Broadway revival ===
An Off-Broadway revival for fall 2026 has been announced. The production will be directed by Danya Taymor with choreography by Celia Rowlson Hall, with plans to premiere at Studio Seaview. Opening night is scheduled for November 27, 2026. The cast was announced on September 16 and is led by Tyler Jordan Wesley (Melchior), Ashlyn Maddox (Wendla), Ryo Kamibayashi (Mortiz), and Amalio Yoo (Ilse). Both Wesley and Yoo have collaborated with Taymor in the past; Wesley played Dallas Winston in the first national tour of the The Outsiders, while Yoo was featured in the 2025 Broadway play John Proctor is the Villain. The supporting cast includes Jack Bateman (Georg), Jada Simone Clark (Thea), Leif Coomer (Ernst), Nando Morland (Otto), Antonio Porciello (Hanschen), Khadija Sankoh (Martha), and Grace Slear (Anna). Bateman and Porciello were the selected two of 2,500 unknowns who auditioned for the show's open call in July.

=== International productions ===
The first European production began on August 30, 2008, at Värmlandsoperan in Karlstad, Sweden, closing in March 2009. A second Swedish language production opened in Helsingborg on March 20, 2009. A Finnish production opened in Helsinki on 5 February 2009 and closed in November 2009. A Hungarian-language (first non-replica) production premiered on February 7, 2009 in Budapest at the Nyugati Teátrum, with the title Tavaszébredés. This production ran until May 26, 2009. A German-language staging opened in Vienna, Austria on March 21, 2009, and closed on May 30, 2009. A live cast recording was released. A Danish-language production opened at Aalborg Teater on June 13, 2009, and closed on September 15. There was also Slovenian production in the Ljubljana City Theatre in 2009.

An English-language production opened in Valletta, Malta at the St. James Cavalier Theatre on April 17, 2009, directed by Wesley Ellul, choreographed by Fiona Barthet and featured Davide Tucci as Georg and Daniel Casingena as Otto. This was produced by the MADC. The run was extended after it sold out.

A Japanese-language production opened in Tokyo at the Shiki Theatre Jiyu May 2, 2009. A Brazilian production in Rio de Janeiro ran with the title O Despertar da Primavera from August 21, 2009 to January 31, 2010. It then transferred to São Paulo. A cast recording was released in January. A Philippine production opened in Manila in the Carlos P. Roumolo Auditorium, RCBC Plaza, on September 25 and ran until the October 17, 2009. It was performed in English and was directed by Chari Arespachochaga. A Czech-language production opened in Brno, Czech Republic at the City Theatre Brno on November 21, 2009.

Sydney Theatre Company staged an Australian non-replica production that opened on 4 February 2010 at the Sydney Theatre and closed on 7 March. An Argentine production with the Spanish title Despertar de Primavera – Un Musical Diferente opened in Buenos Aires on March 19, 2010. A production played at the Griffin Theatre, Chicago, running from December 4 to January 8, 2011. A Welsh language production toured Wales from the beginning of March 2011 visiting 8 different locations, with Theatr Genedlaethol Cymru (Welsh-language national theatre). The first UK national tour took place in May and June 2011, produced by Sell A Door Theatre Company.

== In other media ==
In the television series 90210, the first few episodes contain the school and some of the characters as they prepare, and eventually perform in Spring Awakening, though in reality the amateur production rights were not available at the time. Parts of some songs and scenes are performed through the episodes, such as "Mama Who Bore Me" and "The Bitch of Living". Annie and Ty played the principal roles.

The 2015 Broadway revival was featured in the award-winning documentary series Working in the Theatre produced by the American Theatre Wing. The 2018 television series Rise focuses on a high school English teacher attempting to put on a production of Spring Awakening while facing resistance from members of the community – including parents of cast members – who consider the material inappropriate for teenagers.

The 2018 documentary short film Awakening: After Parkland follows five survivors of the Parkland high school shooting as they resume rehearsals for a community theater production of Spring Awakening in the aftermath of the shooting.

== Major awards and nominations ==
=== Original Off-Broadway/Broadway production ===
Year	Award ceremony	Category	Nominee	Result
2007	Tony Award	Best Musical		Won
2007	Tony Award	Best Book of a Musical	Steven Sater	Won
2007	Tony Award	Best Original Score	Duncan Sheik and Steven Sater	Won
2007	Tony Award	Best Performance by a Leading Actor in a Musical	Jonathan Groff	Nominated
2007	Tony Award	Best Performance by a Featured Actor in a Musical	John Gallagher Jr.	Won
2007	Tony Award	Best Direction of a Musical	Michael Mayer	Won
2007	Tony Award	Best Choreography	Bill T. Jones	Won
2007	Tony Award	Best Orchestrations	Duncan Sheik	Won
2007	Tony Award	Best Scenic Design	Christine Jones	Nominated
2007	Tony Award	Best Costume Design	Susan Hilferty	Nominated
2007	Tony Award	Best Lighting Design	Kevin Adams	Won
2007	Drama Desk Award	Outstanding Musical		Won
2007	Drama Desk Award	Outstanding Book of a Musical	Steven Sater	Nominated
2007	Drama Desk Award	Outstanding Actor in a Musical	John Gallagher Jr.	Nominated
2007	Drama Desk Award	Outstanding Actor in a Musical	Jonathan Groff	Nominated
2007	Drama Desk Award	Outstanding Actress in a Musical	Lea Michele	Nominated
2007	Drama Desk Award	Outstanding Director of a Musical	Michael Mayer	Won
2007	Drama Desk Award	Outstanding Choreography	Bill T. Jones	Nominated
2007	Drama Desk Award	Outstanding Orchestrations	Duncan Sheik	Nominated
2007	Drama Desk Award	Outstanding Music	Duncan Sheik	Won
2007	Drama Desk Award	Outstanding Lyrics	Steven Sater	Won
2007	Lucille Lortel Award	Outstanding Musical (tie with In the Heights)		Won
2007	Lucille Lortel Award	Outstanding Director	Michael Mayer	Nominated
2007	Lucille Lortel Award	Outstanding Choreographer	Bill T. Jones	Nominated
2007	Lucille Lortel Award	Outstanding Costume Design	Susan Hilferty	Nominated
2007	Lucille Lortel Award	Outstanding Lighting Design	Kevin Adams	Won
2007	Lucille Lortel Award	Outstanding Sound Design	Brian Ronan	Nominated
2007	Drama League Award	Distinguished Production of a Musical		Won
2007	Drama League Award	The Julia Hansen Award for Excellence in Directing	Michael Mayer	Won
2007	Drama League Award	Distinguished Performance	John Gallagher Jr.	Nominated
2007	Drama League Award	Distinguished Performance	Jonathan Groff	Nominated
2007	Theatre World Award		Jonathan Groff	Won
2007	New York Drama Critics' Circle	Best Musical	Duncan Sheik and Steven Sater	Won
2007	Outer Critics Circle Award	Outstanding New Broadway Musical		Won
2007	Outer Critics Circle Award	Outstanding New Score		Won
2007	Outer Critics Circle Award	Outstanding Director of a Musical	Michael Mayer	Won
2007	Obie Award	Music and Choreography	Bill T. Jones	Won
2008	Grammy Award	Best Musical Theater Album		Won

=== Original London production ===
Year	Award	Category	Nominee	Result
2009	Critics' Circle Theatre Award	Best Musical		Won
2010	Laurence Olivier Award	Best New Musical		Won
2010	Laurence Olivier Award	Best Actor in a Musical	Aneurin Barnard	Won
2010	Laurence Olivier Award	Best Actress in a Musical	Charlotte Wakefield	Nominated
2010	Laurence Olivier Award	Best Performance in a Supporting Role in a Musical	Iwan Rheon	Won
2010	Laurence Olivier Award	Best Theatre Choreographer	Bill T. Jones	Nominated
2010	Laurence Olivier Award	Best Lighting Design	Kevin Adams	Nominated
2010	Laurence Olivier Award	Best Sound Design	Brian Ronan	Won

=== 2015 Broadway revival ===
Year	Award ceremony	Category	Nominee	Result
2015	Ovation Awards; For the Los Angeles engagements	Best Production of a Musical (Intimate Theatre)	Deaf West Theatre	Won
2015	Ovation Awards; For the Los Angeles engagements	Best Production of a Musical (Large Theatre)	Wallis Annenberg Center	Won
2015	Ovation Awards; For the Los Angeles engagements	Best Acting Ensemble of a Musical		Won
2015	Ovation Awards; For the Los Angeles engagements	Best Choreography	Spencer Liff	Won
2015	Ovation Awards; For the Los Angeles engagements	Best Music Direction	Jared Stein	Nominated
2015	Ovation Awards; For the Los Angeles engagements	Best Direction of a Musical	Michael Arden	Won
2015	Ovation Awards; For the Los Angeles engagements	Best Lead Actor in a Musical	Austin P. McKenzie	Nominated
2015	Ovation Awards; For the Los Angeles engagements	Best Lead Actress in a Musical	Sandra Mae Frank	Nominated
2015	Ovation Awards; For the Los Angeles engagements	Best Featured Actor in a Musical	Andy Mientus	Nominated
2015	Ovation Awards; For the Los Angeles engagements	Best Featured Actress in a Musical	Krysta Rodriguez	Nominated
2015	Ovation Awards; For the Los Angeles engagements	Best Lighting Design (Intimate Theatre)	Travis Hagenbuch	Nominated
2015	Ovation Awards; For the Los Angeles engagements	Best Lighting Design (Large Theatre)	Ben Stanton	Won
2015	Ovation Awards; For the Los Angeles engagements	Best Scenic Design (Large Theatre)	Dane Laffrey	Nominated
2015	Ovation Awards; For the Los Angeles engagements	Best Sound Design (Intimate Theatre)	Philip Allen	Nominated
2015	Ovation Awards; For the Los Angeles engagements	Best Video/Production Design	Lucy Mackinnon	Nominated
2016	Tony Awards	Best Revival of a Musical		Nominated
2016	Tony Awards	Best Director of a Musical	Michael Arden	Nominated
2016	Tony Awards	Best Lighting Design of a Musical	Ben Stanton	Nominated
2016	Drama Desk Awards	Outstanding Revival of a Musical		Nominated
2016	Drama Desk Awards	Outstanding Director of a Musical	Michael Arden	Nominated
2016	Drama Desk Awards	Outstanding Choreography	Spencer Liff	Nominated
2016	Drama Desk Awards	Outstanding Lighting Design	Ben Stanton	Nominated
2016	Drama League Award	Outstanding Revival of a Broadway or Off-Broadway Musical		Nominated
2016	Drama League Award	Unique Contribution to the Theatre Award	Deaf West Theatre	Won
2016	Theatre World Awards		Daniel Durant	Won
2016	Theatre World Awards		Austin P. McKenzie	Won
2016	Outer Critics Circle Award	Outstanding Revival of a Musical (Broadway or off-Broadway)		Nominated
2016	Outer Critics Circle Award	Outstanding Director of a Musical	Michael Arden	Won
2016	Outer Critics Circle Award	Outstanding Choreography	Spencer Liff	Nominated
2016	Outer Critics Circle Award	Outstanding Lighting Design (Play or Musical)	Ben Stanton	Nominated
2016	Outer Critics Circle Award	Outstanding Projection Design (Play or Musical)	Lucy Mackinnon	Nominated
2016	Fred and Adele Astaire Awards	Best Female Dancer	Sandra Mae Frank	Nominated
2016	Fred and Adele Astaire Awards	Best Choreographer	Spencer Liff	Nominated

=== 2021 London revival ===
Year	Award	Category	Nominee	Result
2022	Laurence Olivier Award	Best Musical Revival		Nominated
2022	Critics' Circle Theatre Award	Best Musical		Won
2022	Critics' Circle Theatre Award	Most Promising Newcomer	Stuart Thompson	Won

== Reunion documentary ==
On May 3, 2022, HBO released a documentary film entitled Spring Awakening: Those You've Known, which showcases the 15-year reunion of the original company that was held in November 2021 to benefit the Actors Fund.

== Proposed film adaptation ==
In April 2009, McG was announced as the director for the film adaptation. In 2010, lyricist-librettist Steven Sater told Playbill that a film version of Spring Awakening could begin production in Europe in the spring of 2013. In 2012, Duncan Sheik told Broadwayworld.com that the movie was in development, but not everything was in place yet. In March 2014, Sheik revealed to U-T San Diego that the movie would include a new song. In 2020, Academy Award nominated filmmaker Luca Guadagnino expressed his interest in the project in an interview even mentioning that he had discussed a potential adaptation with Sater. As of December 2024, 15 years after the original announcement, no such film has been produced. Steven Sater has made pleas to film executives via social media to continue the development.
