= Henri Esteve =

Cuban-American actor (born 1990)

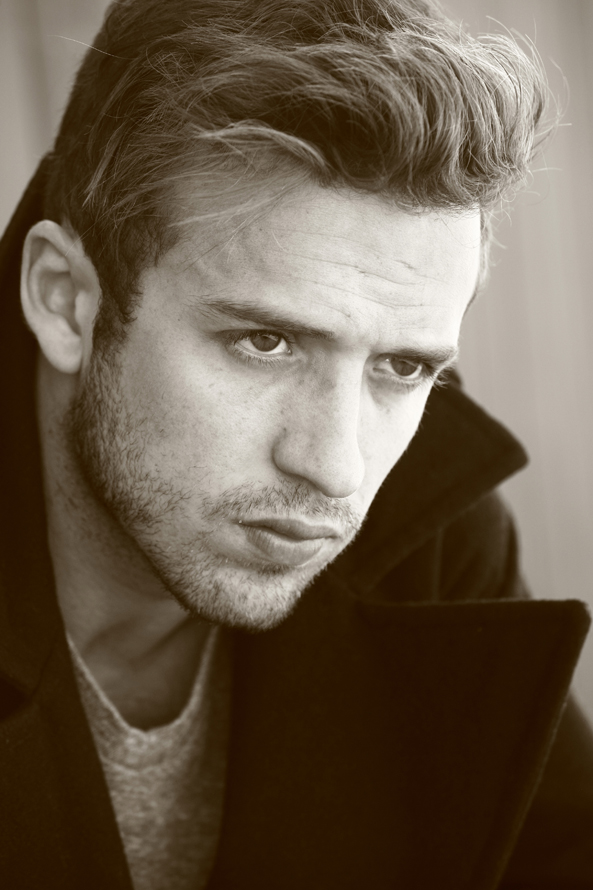
- Born: May 6, 1989 (age 37); Miami, Florida
- Occupation: Actor/ Writer
- Years active: 2014–present

Henri Esteve (born May 6, 1990) is a Cuban-American actor best known for his role as Mike on the Amazon Freevee Series Primo.

== Early life and education ==
Henri was born and raised in Miami Beach, Fl. He has one sibling, an older brother, artist Franz Klainsek. Henri became interested in acting during his teenage years and at 17 moved to New York City. In New York City he completed a two-year conservatory program at the Lee Strasberg Theatre and Film Institute.

== Career ==
After graduating, Esteve initially pursued theater and was cast as Romeo in Romeo and Juliet at La Mama E.T.C. After this he went on to perform in multiple plays around Manhattan, including Does a Tiger Wear a Necktie, and Homefront. He later moved to Los Angeles, where he made his television debut in 2014 on the ABC series Revenge, playing Javier Salgado.

His next film project was again in 2014 in the independent film Microwave directed and written by Neil Champagne, which he starred alongside AJ Buckley and Doris Roberts.

In 2015, Henri began writing and developing a one man show Patsy about the life and death of Lee Harvey Oswald.

Esteve's next film role will be in the feature film Blackout, written and directed by Daniela de Carlo and produced by Aaron Cruze.

In 2018, Henri played Abel in the Prime Video series Homecoming.

In 2020, Henri joined the cast of the Freeform series Grown-ish playing Javier, an attractive grad student whom Ana (Francia Raisa) interns with at Cal U.

== Filmography ==
| Film | Role | Notes |
|---|---|---|
| Microwave | Will | |
| Deepwater Horizon | Andrea's Housemate | |
| Blackout | Alex | |

| Television Show | Role | Notes |
|---|---|---|
| Homecoming | Abel | Recurring (4 Episodes) |
| NCIS | Johnny Diggs | Episode: One Book, Two Covers |
| Revenge | Javier Salgado | Recurring (Season 3) |
| Grown-ish | Javier | Recurring (Season 3 and 4) |
| Primo | Mike | Main cast |
| The Pitt | Rocco Dejulio | Episode: "2:00 P.M." |
