= Jon Michael Hill =

American actor

- Education: University of Illinois Urbana-Champaign
- Occupation: Actor
- Years active: 2007–present

Jon Michael Hill is an American actor. He is best known for his roles as Detective Marcus Bell in the CBS series Elementary (2012–2019) and Detective Damon Washington in the ABC series Detroit 1-8-7 (2010–2011). He is also known for his work on Broadway, and has received two Tony Award nominations. He is an ensemble member at Steppenwolf Theatre Company.

== Life and career ==
Hill played football and the saxophone during his high school years before focusing on pursuing an acting career, attending a summer drama program at Northwestern University. graduated from the University of Illinois Urbana-Champaign in 2007 with a Bachelor of Fine Arts degree in studio acting. While at the university, he appeared in stage productions of King Lear, Six Degrees of Separation and Ain't Misbehavin'.

Hill played the role of Puck in the 2007 Shakespeare in the Park production of A Midsummer Night's Dream. In 2009, Hill was nominated for the Joseph Jefferson Award for Actor in a Supporting Role in a Play for The Tempest at the Steppenwolf Theatre Company in Chicago, Illinois. In 2010, Hill was nominated for a Tony Award as Best Featured Actor in a Play in Superior Donuts opposite Michael McKean. In the same year, he began his role as Detective Damon Washington in the ABC police drama Detroit 1-8-7.

Hill's other television credits include Law & Order: Special Victims Unit, Person of Interest, and Eastbound & Down. He then went on to star in the CBS series Elementary, wherein he played the role of Detective Marcus Bell. In 2018, he made his directorial debut with the Elementary episode "The Worms Crawl In, the Worms Crawl Out".

In 2025, Hill received his second Tony Award nomination for Best Actor for his role in the play Purpose. The play also won the Tony Award for Best Play.

He has been an ensemble member at Steppenwolf Theatre Company since 2007.

== Filmography ==
=== Film ===
Year	Title	Role	Notes
2007	The Last Stain	Brodsky	Short film
2011	Falling Overnight	Troy	
2015	Standing8	Abdul	Short film
2016	No Pay, Nudity	New Kid	
2016	In the Radiant City	Richard Gonzalez	
2018	Pass Over	Moses	
2018	Widows	Reverend Wheeler	
2020	Sanctuary	Reggie	Short film

=== Television ===
Year	Title	Role	Notes
2010–2011	Detroit 1-8-7	Detective Damon Washington	Main cast; 18 episodes
2011	Law & Order: Special Victims Unit	Tre Davis	Episode: "Spiraling Down"
2012	Eastbound & Down	Darnell	6 episodes
2012	Person of Interest	Curtis	Episode: "Wolf and Cub"
2012–2019	Elementary	Detective Marcus Bell	153 episodes; also director of "The Worms Crawl In, the Worms Crawl Out"
2020	The Good Fight	Jumaane Jenkins	Episode: "The Gang Is Satirized and Doesn't Like It"
2022	The Accidental Wolf		Episode: "Abyss"
2022–2023	61st Street	Pastor Richards	9 episodes
2024	A Man in Full	Conrad Hensley	Main cast
2026	Maximum Pleasure Guaranteed	Detective Baxter	Main cast

== Stage ==
Year	Title	Role	Venue	Ref.
2006	The Unmentionables	Etienne	Regional, Steppenwolf Theatre Company	
2007	A Midsummer Night's Dream	Puck	Off-Broadway, Delacorte Theatre	
2008	Superior Donuts	Franco Wicks	Regional, Steppenwolf Theatre Company	
2008	Kafka on the Shore	Performer	Regional, Steppenwolf Theatre Company	
2009	The Tempest	Ariel	Regional, Steppenwolf Theatre Company	
2009	Superior Donuts	Franco Wicks	Broadway, Music Box Theatre	
2011	The Hot l Baltimore	Bill Lewis	Regional, Steppenwolf Theatre Company	
2013	Head of Passes	Crier	Regional, Steppenwolf Theatre Company	
2016	Constellations	Roland	Regional, Steppenwolf Theatre Company	
2017	Pass Over	Moses	Regional, Steppenwolf Theatre Company	
2018	Pass Over	Moses	Off-Broadway, Lincoln Center Theatre	
2019	True West	Austin	Regional, Steppenwolf Theatre Company	
2021	Pass Over	Moses	Broadway, August Wilson Theatre	
2022	True West	Austin	International, Galway International Arts Festival	
2023	The Refuge Plays	Walking Man	Off-Broadway, New York Theatre Workshop	
2024	Purpose	Nazareth "Naz" Jasper	Regional, Steppenwolf Theatre Company	
2024	Leroy and Lucy	Leroy	Regional, Steppenwolf Theatre Company	
2025	Purpose	Nazareth "Naz" Jasper	Broadway, Helen Hayes Theatre	
2026	Windfall	Nurse, Cori	Regional, Steppenwolf Theatre Company	

== Awards and nominations ==
Year	Award	Category	Work	Result	Ref.
2010	Tony Award	Best Featured Actor in a Play	Superior Donuts	Nominated	
2010	Outer Critics Circle Award	Outstanding Featured Actor in a Play	Superior Donuts	Won	
2010	Theatre World Award		Superior Donuts	Won	
2019	Lucille Lortel Award	Outstanding Actor in a Play	Pass Over	Nominated	
2025	Tony Awards	Best Actor in a Play	Purpose	Nominated	
2025	Outer Critics Circle Award	Outstanding Lead Performer in a Broadway Play	Purpose	Nominated	
