= Bill O'Neil =

Bill O'Neil may refer to:

- William O'Neil (1933–2023), American businessman and stockbroker
- Bill O'Neill (disambiguation)

== See also ==
- Bill O'Neal (1949–1990), American FBI informant
