= Pass Over =

- Film poster
- Directed by: Spike Lee (directed by); Danya Taymor (created in collaboration with and directed for the stage by)
- Screenplay by: Antoinette Nwandu
- Based on: Pass Over by Antoinette Nwandu
- Produced by: Spike Lee
- Starring: Jon Michael Hill; Julian Parker; Ryan Hallahan; Blake DeLong
- Cinematography: Chayse Irvin
- Edited by: Hye Mee Na
- Production company: 40 Acres and a Mule Filmworks
- Distributed by: Amazon Studios
- Release dates: January 2018 (Sundance); April 20, 2018
- Running time: 75 minutes
- Country: United States
- Language: English

Pass Over is a 2018 American drama film directed by Spike Lee, and starring Jon Michael Hill, Julian Parker, Ryan Hallahan and Blake DeLong. It is a performance of the play of the same name by Antoinette Nwandu, which takes inspiration from Samuel Beckett's Waiting for Godot and the Book of Exodus. It was directed for the stage by Danya Taymor, and filmed by Spike Lee.

== Premise ==
Moses and Kitch, two young black men, chat their way through a long, aimless day on a Chicago street corner. Periodically ducking bullets and managing visits from a genial but ominous stranger and an overtly hostile police officer, Moses and Kitch rely on their poetic, funny, at times profane banter to get them through a day that is a hopeless retread of every other day, even as they continue to dream of their deliverance.

== Cast ==
- Jon Michael Hill as Moses
- Julian Parker as Kitch
- Ryan Hallahan as Master
- Blake DeLong as Ossifer

== Production ==
The film was shot in 2017 at the Steppenwolf Theatre in Chicago. The stage production was directed by Danya Taymor and the film recording of the performance was directed by Spike Lee.

== Release ==
The film premiered at the 2018 Sundance Film Festival. It was then released via Amazon Prime on April 20, 2018.

== Reception ==
The film has a 93% rating on Rotten Tomatoes. Chuck Bowen of Slant Magazine awarded the film two stars out of four. Chris Nashawaty of Entertainment Weekly graded the film a B. Nick Allen of RogerEbert.com awarded the film three and a half stars. Bradley Gibson of Film Threat gave the film an 8 out of 10.

The Hollywood Reporter gave it a positive review, calling it "More powerful than its filmed-play format might suggest."
