= Will O'Neill =

Will O'Neill may refer to:

- Will O'Neill (ice hockey)
- Will O'Neill (politician)

== See also ==
- William O'Neill (disambiguation)
