= Carlos Santos (comedian) =

Puerto Rican actor and comedian

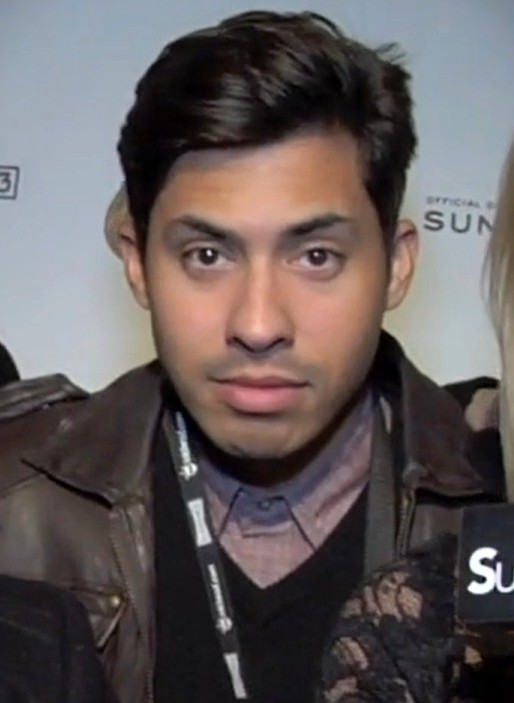
- Santos in 2013
- Born: April 9, 1981 (age 45); Puerto Rico
- Occupations: Actor; comedian; writer
- Years active: 2002–present
- Website: www.instagram.com/ofcourseitscarlos

Carlos Santos (born April 9, 1981) is a Puerto Rican actor and comedian based in Los Angeles. He is best known for playing Chris Morales in the Netflix original series Gentefied. Santos was also the host of the MTV Tres show MiTRL (2006-2009). His credits include Primo, Undone, Vacation Friends, and The Valet.

== Early life and education ==
Santos was born and raised in Puerto Rico. He is the youngest of three children. He learned to speak English growing up from watching television, and particularly enjoyed Teenage Mutant Ninja Turtles, Teen Wolf, and Ghostbusters. Santos named Will Smith, Steve Carell, Jim Carrey, George Lopez, and Pablo Francisco as some of his biggest comedy influences.

He attended college at Fresno State University, first as a computer engineering major before switching to theatre. He took a class about stand-up comedy that first sparked his interest in the medium and began to perform stand-up in Fresno at a local casino. After graduating he moved to Los Angeles and trained in improv at Second City. Santos also gained hosting experience as an anchor for the local television station LATV.

== Career ==
Santos gained prominence as a VJ on the MTV Tres show MiTRL in 2006, which combined comedy and music content. He switched his focus to acting and comedy full-time in 2009, and began to train and perform regularly at Upright Citizens Brigade Theatre.

Santos has acted on series including The Last Man on Earth, 2 Broke Girls, and Bajillion Dollar Properties. His breakout role was on the Netflix comedy series Gentefied (2020-2021) as aspiring chef Chris Morales. He was also a main cast member on the Amazon Freevee sitcom Primo (2023). He acted in the films Vacation Friends, The Valet, There's Something Wrong with the Children and Amor en toda la cara.

He performs at UCB LA as a member of the only all-Latino comedy variety show Spanish Aquí Presents. He also performs stand-up comedy regularly.

== Personal life ==
Santos enjoys Oreo cookies and shares photos of limited edition flavor packs on his Instagram.

== Accolades ==
=== For Gentefied ===
- 2020 – Nominee, Imagen Award for Best Actor –Television
- 2022 – Nominee, Imagen Award for Best Actor – Comedy (Television)

=== For Primo ===
- 2024 – Nominee, Imagen Award for Best Supporting Actor – Comedy (Television)

== Filmography ==
=== Film ===
| Year | Title | Role | Notes |
|---|---|---|---|
| 2013 | Ghost Team One | Sergio | |
| 2021 | Vacation Friends | Maurillio | |
| 2022 | Cheaper by the Dozen | Basketball Announcer | |
| 2022 | The Valet | Javier | |
| 2023 | There's Something Wrong with the Children | Thomas | |
| 2023 | Vacation Friends 2 | Maurillio | |

=== Television ===
| Year | Title | Role | Notes |
|---|---|---|---|
| 2006–2009 | MiTRL | Himself (Host) | |
| 2009 | Entertainment as a Second Language with Carlos Santos | Various | Variety show |
| 2011 | Austin & Ally | Interviewer | Episode: "Secrets & Songbooks" |
| 2016 | 2 Broke Girls | Server | Episode: "And You Bet Your Ass" |
| 2016 | Bajillion Dollar Propertie$ | Vaul | 2 episodes |
| 2017 | Adam Ruins Everything | Taste Tester | Episode: "Adam Ruins the Future" |
| 2018 | The Last Man on Earth | Paco | Episode: "Karl" |
| 2020–21 | Gentefied | Chris Morales | Main cast |
| 2022 | Undone | Alejandro | 3 episodes |
| 2023 | Primo | Ryan | Main cast |
