= Emma Meisel =

American actress (born 1997)

- Born: February 18, 1997 (age 29); United States
- Occupation: Actress
- Years active: 2018–present

Emma Meisel is an American actress. She is best known for playing Steph Denisco in the comedy drama series Doogie Kameāloha, M.D. and currently plays one of the lead characters in the NBC romantic sitcom Newlyweds.

== Early life ==
Meisel grew up in Castle Pines, Colorado. She has wanted to act for as long as she can remember. She graduated from Denver School of the Arts in 2015. She attended The New School College of Performing Arts in New York and also spent a semester studying in London. After returning to the States she decided to move to Los Angeles to search for acting opportunities. Upon arriving in Los Angeles she immediately enrolled in Lesly Kahn’s acting school. She also took classes at The Groundlings Theater & School.

== Career ==
Meisel made her on screen debut in an episode of the sitcom The Kids Are Alright. One of her first big roles came playing Midge in the horror show American Horror Story: 1984, the ninth season of the American Horror Story series. Her biggest role so far has been playing Steph Denisco in the comedy drama series Doogie Kameāloha, M.D.. She portrayed Crystal, of the one main characters of the psychological thriller film Please Don't Feed the Children. In July 2026 it was announced she would be cast in a new romantic comedy series called Newlyweds starring Tea Leoni.

== Filmography ==
=== Film ===
Year	Title	Role	Notes
2020	Vegas High	Woman	
2024	Please Don't Feed the Children	Crystal	
2025	The Haunt on Highway 33	Gigi	
2026	Spider Monkeys	Lori	Short

=== Television ===
Year	Title	Role	Notes
2018	Knight Squad	Violet	Episode; Do the Knight Thing
2019	The Kids Are Alright	Angela	Episode; Timmy's New Hobby
2019	American Horror Story: 1984	Midge	5 episodes
2019	The Dead Girls Detective Agency	Violetta Coco	3 episodes
2021–2023	Doogie Kameāloha, M.D.	Steph Denisco	20 episodes
2026–present	Newlyweds	Poppy	Main role
