= Antoinette Nwandu =

American playwright based in New York

Antoinette Chinonye Nwandu is an American playwright based in New York.

== Background ==
Antoinette Nwandu was born and raised in Los Angeles. She studied at Harvard University, the University of Edinburgh, and NYU's Tisch School of the Arts. She is a member of the Ars Nova Play Group, and was the 2015–2016 Naked Angels Issues Playlab Resident at The New School for Performing Arts. Nwandu was also a 2013–2014 Dramatists Guild Fellow and a Eugene O'Neill Playwrights Conference Fellow. She frequently performs with the spoken-word ensemble Sister Scribes.

Nwandu has worked with the Cherry Lane Mentor Project, Page73, Ars Nova, The Flea, Naked Angels, Fire This Time, The Movement Theater Company, WordBRIDGE, and Dreamscape Theatre. She has received the Lorraine Hansberry Playwriting Award for Flat Sam in 2009 and the Negro Ensemble Company's Douglas Turner Ward Prize. She has also been a Playwrights of New York Fellowship finalist, a Page73 Fellowship finalist, an NBT (National Black Theatre) I Am Soul Fellowship finalist, and a Princess Grace Award semi-finalist.

In 2015, Nwandu's play Pass Over was a finalist for the Ruby Prize. It was included on the 2016 Kilroys' List. Pass Over premiered at the Steppenwolf Theatre Company in Chicago in May 2017. The play was recorded live at the Steppenwolf Theatre, adapted for film by co-director Danya Taymor and co-director and producer Spike Lee and premiered on Amazon Prime Video on April 20, 2018. Its New York debut was at LCT3/Lincoln Center Theater in June 2018.

Her play Breach: a manifesto on race in america through the eyes of a black girl recovering from self-hate was staged at Victory Gardens Theater in 2018 by director Lisa Portes.

== Notable works ==
- FLAT SAM (2013)
- Vanna White Must Die (2012)
- Black Boy & the War (2011)
- 4 Sustenance (2012)
- Pass Over (2017)
- BREACH: a manifesto on race in America through the eyes of a black girl recovering from self-hate (2018)
