= Doogie Kameāloha, M.D. =

American medical comedy-drama television series (2021–2023)

- Genre: Medical comedy drama
- Based on: Doogie Howser, M.D. by Steven Bochco & David E. Kelley
- Developed by: Kourtney Kang
- Starring: Peyton Elizabeth Lee; Emma Meisel; Matthew Sato; Wes Tian; Jeffrey Bowyer-Chapman; Mapuana Makia; Kathleen Rose Perkins; Jason Scott Lee
- Theme music composer: Mike Post
- Composer: Wendy Wang
- Country of origin: United States
- Original language: English
- No. of seasons: 2
- No. of episodes: 20

Production
- Executive producers: Matt Kuhn; Justin McEwen; Erin O'Malley; Jesse Bochco; Dayna Bochco; Jake Kasdan; Melvin Mar; Kourtney Kang
- Producers: Megan Mascena; Sasha Stroman; Patrick Kang & Michael Levin
- Cinematography: Timothy Gillis
- Editors: Hugh Ross; Matthew Freund; Sarah Lucky; Keith Mahoney; Giselle Murillo; Brian Barr; Nathan Draper; Lane Farnham; Tom Nuzzalo; Jamie Conklin; Dawn Minkow
- Camera setup: Single-camera
- Running time: 26–34 minutes
- Production companies: Kang-Rosenblatt Productions; The Detective Agency; Steven Bochco Productions; 20th Television

Original release
- Network: Disney+
- Release: September 8, 2021 – March 31, 2023

Doogie Kameāloha, M.D. is an American family medical comedy-drama television series developed by Kourtney Kang that is based on the 1989–93 ABC series Doogie Howser, M.D.. It stars Peyton Elizabeth Lee as the title character, Lahela "Doogie" Kameāloha, and Kathleen Rose Perkins, Jeffrey Bowyer-Chapman, Jason Scott Lee, and Ronny Chieng in supporting roles. The series premiered September 8, 2021 on Disney+. In February 2022, the series was renewed for a second season which premiered on March 31, 2023. In August 2023, the series was canceled by Disney after two seasons.

== Premise ==
Lahela "Doogie" Kameāloha is a child prodigy juggling her teenage life and family with an early medical career, as well as having to deal with balancing her relationship with her mother, who is also her boss. Lahela has the nickname "Doogie" from the television show Doogie Howser, M.D..

== Cast ==
=== Main ===
- Peyton Elizabeth Lee as Lahela "Doogie" Kameāloha, a 16-year-old University of Hawaii Medical School graduate. She is nicknamed "Doogie" because of the television show Doogie Howser, M.D.
- Emma Meisel as Steph Denisco, Lahela's best friend. She has a crush on Lahela's brother, Kai.
- Matthew Sato as Kai Kameāloha, Lahela's older brother. He has a crush on Doogie's best friend, Steph, but doesn't know how to express his feelings.
- Wes Tian as Brian Patrick Kameāloha, Lahela's younger brother
- Jeffrey Bowyer-Chapman as Charles Zeller, one of Lahela's colleagues at Oahu Health Medical Center
- Mapuana Makia as Noelani Nakayama, another colleague of Lahela's at Oahu Health Medical Center
- Kathleen Rose Perkins as Dr. Clara Hannon, Lahela's mother and the chief of medicine at Oahu Health Medical Center where Doogie works
- Jason Scott Lee as Benny Kameāloha, Lahela's father and the owner of a food truck called Benny's Shave Ice and Flowers

=== Recurring ===
- Ronny Chieng (Note: Ronny Chieng is credited as "Special Guest Star" but is a recurring cast member.) as Dr. Lee, a heart surgeon at Oahu Health Medical Center
- Alex Aiono as Walter Taumata, a local teenage surfer, in whom Doogie is romantically interested
- Andrew Tinpo Lee as Mr. Hsiao
- Milo Manheim as Nico (season 2), Lahela's patient who has been in and out of hospitals due having acute lymphoblastic leukemia and new love interest

=== Guest stars ===
- Barry Bostwick as Will, a patient of Lahela's suffering from heart failure who passes away in the first episode. He is the first patient she loses and originally the only person allowed to call her Doogie.
- Randall Park as Dr. Choi, the chief of staff at Oahu Health Medical Center who leaving for another position with the Los Angeles Lakers
- Magic Johnson as Himself
- Margaret Cho as Frankie, a patient of Lahela's who has chronic renal failure and needs a new kidney
- Kylie Cantrall as Olivia, the captain of the "Royals" dance team
- Max Greenfield as Dr. Arthur Goldstein
- Ty Simpkins as Anthony
- Alyson Hannigan as Dawn
- Daniel Dae Kim as Max Lee, the CEO of Oahu Health Medical Center
- Lexie Duncan as Blake
- Kimiko Glenn as Kayla
- Missi Pyle as Marjorie Crawford

== Episodes ==
=== Series overview ===
Season	Episodes	Originally released	
Season	Episodes	First released	Last released
1	10	September 8, 2021	November 10, 2021
2	10	March 31, 2023	

=== Season 1 (2021) ===
No. overall	No. in season	Title	Directed by	Written by	Original release date	Prod. code
1	1	"Aloha – The Hello One"	Jake Kasdan	Kourtney Kang	September 8, 2021	1FSF01
2	2	"Love Is a Mystery"	Erin O'Malley	Alison Bennett	September 15, 2021	1FSF02
3	3	"License to Not Drive"	Erin O'Malley	Sasha Stroman	September 22, 2021	1FSF03
4	4	"Lahela & Stitch"	Jesse Bochco	Steve Joe	September 29, 2021	1FSF04
5	5	"Dunk Cost"	Randall Park	Patrick Kang & Michael Levin	October 6, 2021	1FSF05
6	6	"Career Babes"	Jesse Bochco	Hayley Adams & JoEllen Redlingshafer	October 13, 2021	1FSF06
7	7	"Mom-Mentum"	Sean Kavanagh	Mathew Harawitz	October 20, 2021	1FSF07
8	8	"Talk-Story"	Gina Rodriguez	Matt Kuhn	October 27, 2021	1FSF08
9	9	"Scutwork"	Erin O'Malley	Matt Kuhn	November 3, 2021	1FSF09
10	10	"Aloha – The Goodbye One"	Erin O'Malley	Steve Joe	November 10, 2021	1FSF10

=== Season 2 (2023) ===
No. overall	No. in season	Title	Directed by	Written by	Original release date	Prod. code
11	1	"A Hui Hou (Until We Meet Again)"	Sean Kavanagh	Kourtney Kang	March 31, 2023	2FSF01
12	2	"Mythological Creatures"	Nick Wong	Alison Bennett	March 31, 2023	2FSF02
13	3	"Message from the Chief"	Sean Kavanagh	Patrick Kang & Michael Levin	March 31, 2023	2FSF03
14	4	"Black Cloud, White Cloud"	Sean Kavanagh	Matthew Zinman & Craig Gerard	March 31, 2023	2FSF04
15	5	"Dance Dance Evolution"	Jesse Bochco	Sasha Stroman	March 31, 2023	2FSF05
16	6	"Post-Kiss Bliss"	Jesse Bochco	Hayley Adams & JoEllen Redlingshafer	March 31, 2023	2FSF06
17	7	"I'm Just a Mom"	Sean Kavanagh; Keith Powell	Dani Shank	March 31, 2023	2FSF07
18	8	"Crouching Tiger, Hidden Doctor"	Dennis Liu	Steve Joe	March 31, 2023	2FSF08
19	9	"Now What?"	Melissa Kosar	Matt Kuhn	March 31, 2023	2FSF09
20	10	"Me"	Anya Adams	Kourtney Kang & Matt Kuhn	March 31, 2023	2FSF10

== Production ==
It was announced in April 2020 that a female-led show based on Doogie Howser, M.D. was put into development at Disney+, developed by Kourtney Kang. The series is set in Hawaii to reflect Kang's background. In September 2020, it was picked to series by Disney+. In January 2021, Peyton Elizabeth Lee was cast in the titular role, with Kathleen Rose Perkins, Jeffrey Bowyer-Chapman, and Jason Scott Lee cast as leads. Mapuana Makia and Matthew Sato joined the cast as series regulars in the following months. In March 2021, Ronny Chieng joined in a recurring role while Emma Meisel was cast in a main role. Filming began on December 7, 2020, in Honolulu and Los Angeles. On February 3, 2022, Disney+ renewed the series for a second season. On May 26, 2022, Milo Manheim was cast in a recurring capacity for the second season. On August 25, 2023, the series was cancelled after two seasons.

== Release ==
The series premiered on Disney+ on September 8, 2021. The rest of the episodes were released weekly on Wednesdays. The second season was released on March 31, 2023.

== Reception ==
=== Critical response ===
The review aggregator website Rotten Tomatoes reported a 92% approval rating with an average rating of 6.6/10, based on 13 critic reviews. The website's critics consensus reads, "With a winning cast and a great bedside manner, Doogie Kamealoha, M.D. pays homage to its predecessor while successfully carving its own charming path." Metacritic gave the series a weighted average score of 75 out of 100 based on 5 critic reviews, indicating "generally favorable reviews".

Daniel Fienberg of The Hollywood Reporter stated that the series serves as an example of how a franchise can be modernized across time, claiming it succeeds to provide a story that can appeal to the nostalgic audience of Doogie Howser, M.D. and still manages to be a good story that can stand on its own, while complimenting the performances of the cast. Joel Keller of Decider claimed that the show manages to distinguish itself from Doogie Howser, M.D by creating its own identity, citing its gender-flipped lead character and the story sets in Hawaii, found the series funny and family-oriented, and praised the chemistry between the actors and their performances. Caroline Framke of Variety described the show as a sweet, bright, and earnest Disney Channel sitcom. Polly Conway of Common Sense Media rated the series 4 out of 5 stars, acclaimed the depiction of positive messages, citing compassion, courage, and teamwork, applauded the presence of positive role models, stating that Peyton Elizabeth Lee's character demonstrates sensitivity and consideration for the needs of other individuals, while complimenting the diversity of the cast members.

=== Accolades ===
Year	Award	Category	Recipient	Result	Ref.
2022	33rd GLAAD Media Awards	Outstanding Kids & Family Programming	Doogie Kameāloha, M.D.	Nominated	
2022	Children's and Family Emmy Awards	Outstanding Young Teen Series	Doogie Kameāloha, M.D.	Nominated	
2022	Children's and Family Emmy Awards	Outstanding Guest Performance in Preschool, Children's or Young Teen Program	Randall Park	Nominated	
2022	Children's and Family Emmy Awards	Outstanding Writing for a Young Teen Program	Kourtney Kang	Nominated	
2022	Children's and Family Emmy Awards	Outstanding Casting for a Live-Action Program	Leslie Woo	Nominated	
