= Lisa Muse Bryant =

American writer and producer

Lisa Muse Bryant is an American writer and producer. She was a co-executive producer for black-ish, an executive producer for the Amazon Freevee sitcom Primo, and a consulting producer for Marvel’s Moon Girl and Devil Dinosaur. She was an executive producer for the second season of Kenan. Bryant signed an overall deal with Universal Television in 2022. Bryant won a Children’s and Family Emmy Award for Outstanding Animated Special for her work on Moon Girl and Devil Dinosaur.

== Awards and nominations ==
- 2021 – Nominee, Primetime Emmy Award for Outstanding Comedy Series, black-ish
- 2023 – Winner, Children’s and Family Emmy Award for Outstanding Animated Special, Moon Girl and Devil Dinosaur
- 2023 – Nominee, Children’s and Family Emmy Award for Children's or Young Teen Animated Series, Moon Girl and Devil Dinosaur
- 2023 – Nominee, Humanitas Prize for Children’s teleplay (live-action or animation), Moon Girl and Devil Dinosaur (“Hair Today Gone Tomorrow”)
