= Holly Howden Gilchrist =

Scottish actress (born c. 2005)

Holly Howden Gilchrist (born c. 2005) is a Scottish actress.

== Personal life ==
She is the daughter of Kath Howden, who played Beatrice in A View from the Bridge in Edinburgh.

== Training ==
Gilchrist is a graduate of the Royal Conservatoire of Scotland.

== Appearances ==
Gilchrist had an early appearance as Morag in the 2016 film version of Whisky Galore!.

In 2023, Gilchrist appeared in the TV series Murder is Easy.

In 2025, Gilchrist appeared as Catherine in A View from the Bridge at the Tron Theatre, in Blinded by the Light at the Traverse Theatre, in Small Acts of Love at the Citizens Theatre, and as Bright in Beauty and the Beast at the Citizens Theatre.

She played Suzy in the 2025 film I Swear.

In early 2026 she played Beth Powell in John Proctor Is the Villain at the Royal Court Theatre in London.

She appeared in Antigone, as Ismene the younger sister, at the Tron Theatre in Glasgow in September-October 2026. After this she will return to London for the next run of John Proctor Is the Villain.

== Awards and recognition ==
Gilchrist received the Donald Dewar Award for talent in the arts.
