= William O'Neal =

William O'Neal may refer to:

- William O'Neal (informant) (1949–1990), American FBI informant
- William O'Neal Lockridge (1947–2011), American political activist
- William R. O'Neal (1864–1946) American lawyer and businessman

== See also ==
- William O'Neil (disambiguation)
- William O'Neill (disambiguation)
