= The Valet =

The Valet may refer to:

- The Valet (2006 film), a French comedy film
- The Valet (2022 film), an American romantic comedy film, a remake of the above

== See also ==
- Valet, a male servant who serves as personal attendant to his employer
