= Newlyweds (2026 TV series) =

American sitcom

- Genre: Sitcom
- Created by: Jamie Lee Curtis; Gail Lerner
- Showrunners: Gail Lerner; Bruce Helford
- Starring: Téa Leoni; Tim Daly; Bill O'Neill; Emma Meisel; Ignacio Diaz-Silverio
- Music by: Michael Leonhart
- Country of origin: United States
- Original language: English
- No. of seasons: 1
- No. of episodes: 5

Production
- Executive producers: Gail Lerner; Jamie Lee Curtis; Eric Tannenbaum; Kim Tannenbaum; Jason Wang; Scott Schwartz; Pamela Fryman; Bruce Helford
- Producer: Steve Sandoval
- Cinematography: Gary Baum
- Editors: Sue Federman; Chris Poulos
- Camera setup: Multi-camera
- Running time: 21 minutes
- Production companies: Keep Good Company; Mohawk Productions; Comet Pictures; The Tannenbaum Company; Lionsgate Television; Universal Television

Original release
- Network: NBC
- Release: October 23, 2026 – present

Newlyweds is an American sitcom television series created by Jamie Lee Curtis and Gail Lerner, starring real-life spouses Téa Leoni and Tim Daly that premiered on NBC on October 23, 2026.

== Synopsis ==
The series is a later-in-life love story about a free-spirited woman and a buttoned-up professor who marry impetuously after a whirlwind courtship.

== Cast ==
=== Main ===
- Téa Leoni as Jeanie
- Tim Daly as James
- Bill O'Neill as Arvid
- Emma Meisel as Poppy, Jeanie's biological daughter
- Ignacio Diaz-Silverio as Lolo, Jeanie's adoptive son

=== Recurring ===
- Jamie Lee Curtis as Claudia, James' ex-wife who often shows up at James' house unannounced
- Al Madrigal as Dan, Jeanie and James' mutual friend who set them up together

== Episodes ==
No.	Title	Directed by	Written by	Original release date
1	"Pilot"	Pamela Fryman	Teleplay by : Gail Lerner; Story by : Jamie Lee Curtis & Gail Lerner	October 23, 2026
Jeanie, a middle school science teacher, and James, a philosophy professor, both expect their blind date to go poorly, but they immediately hit it off. James meets Jeanie's daughter Poppy and her adopted son Lolo before he has to go to Norway to work on his stalled book. In Norway, James' quirky assistant Arvid snoops on his phone calls with Jeanie, while Jeanie enters James' house with some flowers to leave for when he gets back. Once inside, she meets James' ex-wife Claudia, who assumes Jeanie is the new maid. When James returns home, he proposes to Jeanie, suggesting a Vegas wedding.
2	"My Place or Yours"	Gloria Calderón Kellett	Gail Lerner	October 30, 2026
After their Vegas wedding, James and Jeanie try to decide whose place to stay at. Jeanie says how much she'll miss her children, while James finds Jeanie's place too cramped. They briefly try being married while living in separate homes, but quickly realize they miss each other too much. At the same time, Arvid shows up unexpectedly from Norway, without a place to stay, so James makes room for him in the pool house. Arvid tells Jeanie he hopes to be James' teaching assistant in America. Meanwhile, Claudia finally learns that Jeanie is not the maid. In a private moment, she tells James she expected him to find a much younger woman after their divorce. She says she's very jealous that James married a kind, intelligent, age-appropriate woman.
3	"We'll Never Have Paris"	Gloria Calderón Kellett	Corey Nickerson	November 6, 2026
Unable to get away for an extended honeymoon, James and Jeanie opt for a "minimoon" in which they'll enjoy a Paris picnic, a Budapest massage and Japanese sushi all in one day at James' house. But their plans are spoiled by the couple's hangers-on (Jeanie's children and James' ex, Claudia). Agreeing that neither has been effective getting the people in their lives to respect their marriage, they propose that James should talk to Poppy and Lolo while Jeanie talks to Claudia. The results are mixed.
4	"Back in Time"	Gail Mancuso	Teleplay by : Helen Fernandez & Maddie Halliday; Story by : Bruce Helford & Boco Haft	November 13, 2026
Claudia suggests that James and Jeanie join her at her therapy session so they can resolve lingering issues and get closure. At the session, Claudia expresses her depression over James finding happiness so quickly. However, both James and Jeanie recall the day after their first date (and first night in bed), when each made a rash move due to doubts about how fast things were moving.
5	"Thanksgiving"	Gail Mancuso	Alex Herschlag	November 20, 2026
6	"Christmas Miracles"	TBA	Yamara Taylor	December 4, 2026

== Production ==
=== Development ===
The pilot of Newlyweds was ordered by NBC in January 2026. The executive producers include Gail Lerner who wrote the pilot, Jamie Lee Curtis, Eric Tannenbaum, Kim Tannenbaum, and Scott Schwartz. Before the pilot order by the network, the project was once set up at Netflix, with Curtis starring as a lead. However, it was reported that there had been a possibility for Curtis to take on a recurring guest role. Pamela Fryman directed the pilot of the series. In May, the series was greenlit. The series premiered on October 23, 2026.

On October 9, 2026, Lerner stated that she was fired from the series after working on the first six episodes, and the reason that she had been given was "creative differences". A week later, Bruce Helford replaced Lerner as showrunner.

=== Casting ===
In February 2026, the real-life married couple Téa Leoni and Tim Daly was announced as leads in the show, with Leoni serving as a producer.

In July, Emma Meisel, Ignacio Diaz-Silverio, Bill O'Neill joined the series as series regulars. In August, Al Madrigal joined the cast in a recurring role.

== Reception ==
On the review aggregator website Rotten Tomatoes, the series holds an approval rating of 80%, based on 10 reviews, with an average of rated reviews of 5.5/10. Metacritic, which uses a weighted average, assigned a score of 59 out of 100 based on 5 critics, indicating "mixed or average" reviews.
