= Primo (TV series) =

2023 American sitcom television series

- Genre: Sitcom
- Created by: Shea Serrano
- Starring: Ignacio Diaz-Silverio; Christina Vidal; Carlos Santos; Henri Esteve; Johnny Rey Diaz; Jonathan Medina; Efraín Villa; Stakiah Washington; Martin Martinez; Nigel Siwabessy
- Country of origin: United States
- Original language: English
- No. of seasons: 1
- No. of episodes: 8

Production
- Executive producers: Shea Serrano; Mike Schur; David Miner; Morgan Sackett; Peter Murrieta; Lisa Muse Bryant
- Camera setup: Single-camera
- Running time: 30 minutes
- Production companies: Amazon Studios; Fremulon; 3 Arts Entertainment; Universal Television

Original release
- Network: Amazon Freevee
- Release: May 19, 2023

Primo is an American sitcom created by Shea Serrano. The semi-autobiographical series, co-executive produced with Michael Schur, is based on Serrano's upbringing in San Antonio, Texas. Primo stars Ignacio Diaz-Silverio, Christina Vidal, Carlos Santos, Henri Esteve, Johnny Rey Diaz, Jonathan Medina, Efraín Villa, Stakiah Lynn Washington, Martin Martinez, and Nigel Siwabessy. The series debuted on May 19, 2023 on Amazon Freevee and received widespread critical acclaim. It was cancelled by Amazon Freevee on May 21, 2024.

== Plot ==
Primo is a coming-of-age comedy about a teenager balancing college aspirations, societal expectations, and a hectic home life anchored by his single mom and five uncles."

== Cast and characters ==
- Ignacio Diaz-Silverio as Rafa, a 16-year-old high school junior navigating school, home, and career aspirations
- Christina Vidal as Drea, Rafa's mom and the third eldest among her brothers
- Carlos Santos as Ryan, Rafa's youngest uncle, who is a bank teller
- Henri Esteve as Mike, Rafa's second youngest uncle who is a strict military member
- Johnny Rey Diaz as Rollie, Rafa's wild uncle
- Jonathan Medina as Jay, Rafa's oldest uncle who is a pragmatist
- Efraín Villa as Mondo, the second oldest uncle and a cosmic wanderer
- Stakiah Lynn Washington as Mya, Rafa's friend who he has a crush on
- Martin Martinez as Miguel, Rafa's close friend
- Nigel Siwabessy as Harris, one of Rafa's closest friends

== Episodes ==
No.	Title	Directed by	Written by	Original release date
1	"Big Eyes"	Kabir Akhtar	Shea Serrano	May 19, 2023
Rafa considers signing up for a college prep program amidst competing opinions from his single mom Drea and his five opinionated uncles.
2	"The Cookout"	Cortney Carillo	Debby Wolfe & Jason Concepcion	May 19, 2023
A long-held family secret gets exposed at the annual Gonzales family Labor Day barbecue. Fireworks and a crossbow are also involved.
3	"The Ride Home"	Cortney Carillo	Peter Murrieta & Alex Zaragoza	May 19, 2023
Rafa tries to convince Ryan to let him borrow his car after Mya asks him for a ride home; Mike, Rollie, and Drea try to find Mondo after hearing he might be in danger.
4	"The Game Champ"	Melissa Fumero	Lisa Muse Bryant & Malloy Moseley	May 19, 2023
Ryan gets unexpectedly jealous when Drea celebrates Rafa for winning an award. Mike traps Jay on the roof as payback. A ghost owes Rollie some money.
5	"The Carnival"	Kabir Akhtar	Lisa Muse Bryant & Pedro Gonzalez	May 19, 2023
Rafa tries to impress Mya at a carnival. Ryan and Jay have to rebuild Drea's favorite bookshelf after accidentally destroying it.
6	"The Candy Bar"	Melissa Fumero	Peter Murrieta & Alex Zaragoza	May 19, 2023
Rafa and Miguel deal with different consequences after stealing a candy bar. Ryan tries to get Jay to open a bank account.
7	"The Recruitment Fair"	Rebecca Asher	Sylvia Batey Alcalá & Pedro Gonzalez	May 19, 2023
Rafa tries to win over Mya's dad after accidentally making an inappropriate joke in front of him. Rollie helps Mondo with a bully. Drea enjoys some freedom.
8	"What?"	Rebecca Asher	Shea Serrano & Jason Concepcion	May 19, 2023
After talking with Drea, Rafa decides it's finally time to tell Mya how he feels about her. The uncles work together to investigate a threat.

== Production ==
The Hollywood Reporter announced in October 2017 that a semi-autobiographical sitcom comedy series created by Shea Serrano and produced by Mike Schur was in development at ABC, who made a put pilot commitment. Writer Serrano reportedly pitched the series to Schur because he was "tired of waiting for there to be more Mexicans on TV." In May 2021, it was announced that series was in development at Amazon Studios' free streaming service IMDb TV. On October 25, 2021, it was announced that Universal Television and IMDb TV had ordered Primo, to be co-executive produced by Serrano, Schur (Fremulon), David Miner (3 Arts Entertainment), Morgan Sackett, Peter Murrieta, and Lisa Muse Bryant.

Ignacio Diaz-Silverio, Martin Martinez, Carlos Santos, Johnny Rey Diaz, Henri Esteve, Jonathan Medina, Nigel Siwabessy, Christina Vidal, Efraín Villa, and Stakiah Washington were announced as main cast members on May 12, 2022. Diaz-Silverio portrays the role of Rafa, based on Serrano, in his first lead acting role.

The series was filmed in Albuquerque, New Mexico beginning in May 2022. The pilot was directed by Kabir Akhtar.

Amazon Freevee cancelled the series after one season on May 21, 2024. The producers at Universal Television are purported to be shopping Primo around to other networks.

== Release ==
Primo premiered on Amazon Freevee on May 19, 2023 with all eight episodes released simultaneously.

== Critical reception ==
Primo received critical acclaim. The review aggregator website Rotten Tomatoes reported a 100% approval rating with an average rating of 7.5/10, based on 22 critic reviews. The website's critics consensus reads, "Bearing the unmistakable stamp of creator Shea Serrano's authentic voice, Primo is a generation-spanning sitcom that feels like home." Metacritic, which uses a weighted average, assigned a score of 82 out of 100 based on six critic reviews, indicating "universal acclaim".

Manuel Betancourt of The A.V. Club wrote, "Serrano has carefully built a wry love letter to his upbringing, turning what surely felt like nagging family obligations into sitcom-ready plots and concocting a comfort watch that puts a Mexican-American family front and center along the way." Matt Monagle stated in a positive review for Houston Chronicle, "the first season of Primo is well worth your time; the finale weaves together a handful of narrative threads and shows the full depth of the creators' empathy for these characters." In a Texas Monthly review, Luis Rendon described the unconventional representation of a Latino family, who do not speak any Spanish beyond the title of the show: "The Gonzaleses, the family at its center, just get to tell jokes, do bits, and be themselves without having to force 'very special moments' around identity." The Hollywood Reporter's Daniel Feinberg praised the acting of Christina Vidal, "Vidal, who has spent nearly three decades being misused and underused in various TV and film projects, has perhaps her best role to date, expertly participating in and breaking up the potential testosterone avalanche."

Proma Khosla of IndieWire named Primo the seventh best new TV show of the year and called the series "pure sitcom gold". The series was also listed seventh on Rotten Tomatoes' list of the Best New TV & Streaming Shows of 2023 Ranked. Vanity Fair listed it as one of the Best TV Shows of 2023. Mashable's Belen Edwards named Primo the Best New Sitcom of 2023. Cracked ranked the show as number one on the Funniest Shows of 2023 list and RogerEbert.com included it in the 25 Best TV Series of 2023 list. Rolling Stone included it in its list of the Best New TV shows of 2023.

TV Insider named Ignacio Diaz-Silverio one of the 11 Breakout TV Stars of 2023.

== Awards and nominations ==
Year	Award	Category	Nominee	Result	Ref.
2024	Imagen Awards	Best Comedy Series	Primo	Nominated	
2024	Imagen Awards	Best Actor – Comedy (Television)	Ignacio Diaz-Silverio	Won	
2024	Imagen Awards	Best Actress – Comedy (Television)	Christina Vidal	Nominated	
2024	Imagen Awards	Best Supporting Actor – Comedy (Television)	Carlos Santos	Nominated	
2024	Young Artist Awards	Best Performance in a Streaming Series – Recurring Youth Artist	Michael Sifain	Won	
