= Superior Donuts =

2008 play by Tracy Letts

- Poster for the Broadway production
- Original language: English
- Written by: Tracy Letts
- Genre: Comedy
- Setting: A small donut shop in Uptown, Chicago

Premiere
- Date: 2008
- Place: Steppenwolf Theatre Company

Superior Donuts is a play by American playwright Tracy Letts. Its world premiere was staged by the Steppenwolf Theatre Company in Chicago in 2008. It premiered on Broadway in 2009.

== Synopsis ==
The play focuses on the relationship between despondent Arthur Przybyszewski, a former 1960s radical who owns a rundown donut shop in Chicago's Uptown, and Franco, his energetic but troubled young African American assistant, who wants to update the establishment with lively music and healthy menu options. Dialogue scenes are separated by soliloquies in which Arthur discusses his past and reminisces about the city as it was in his younger years.

== Production history ==
The play, directed by Tina Landau, was performed at the Downstairs Theatre in Chicago by the Steppenwolf Theatre Company between June 19 and August 24, 2008.

Again directed by Landau and with the Steppenwolf cast intact, the Broadway production began previews at the Music Box Theatre on September 16, 2009, and officially opened on October 1, with Michael McKean as Arthur Przybyszewski and Jon Michael Hill as Franco. Also in the cast were Yasen Peyankov as Russian appliance dealer Max Tarasov, James Vincent Meredith as local beat cop James Hailey, Jane Alderman as wise-crazy alcoholic Lady Boyle, Kate Buddeke as Randy Osteen (a cop who takes a liking to Arthur), Cliff Chamberlain as thug Kevin MaGee, Michael Garvey as surprise visitor Kiril Ivakina, and Robert Maffia as loan shark Luther Flynn. The show closed on January 3, 2010.

Despite its limited run on Broadway, Superior Donuts was slated to be produced by many regional theatres in the 2010–11 season. Pittsburgh Public Theater, Arden Theatre Company (Philadelphia), Denver Center Theatre Company, The Studio Theatre (in Washington, DC), San Diego Repertory Theatre, TheatreWorks (California) and Mad Cow Theatre (Florida), Artists Repertory Theatre (Portland, Oregon) all planned to produce Superior Donuts in 2010–11. The Lyric Stage Company of Boston, Sacramento's Capital Stage, and Chicago's Mary-Arrchie Theatre planned to produce Superior Donuts in their 2011–12 season. The Purple Rose Theatre in Chelsea, Michigan, led off its 2012–13 season with Superior Donuts.

In May 2011, Superior Donuts was directed by Kate Powers and performed for an audience of prisoners and community guests by a cast of prisoners who participate in Rehabilitation Through the Arts at Sing Sing Correctional Facility. The Sing Sing cast was visited in rehearsal by Michael McKean, who shared his insight as Arthur Przybyszewski.

== Critical reception ==
In his review of the original Chicago production, Charles Isherwood of the New York Times said the play "has a lot in common with the deep-fried breakfast food of the title. It’s insubstantial and sweet, with virtually no nutritional value. Still, minor though this comedy is, it is also hard to dislike. Who doesn’t hanker for a doughnut now and then?" In reviewing the Broadway production, Isherwood described the play as "a gentle comedy that unfolds like an extended episode of a 1970s sitcom" and "a warm bath of a play that will leave Broadway audiences with satisfied smiles rather than rattled nerves." He felt if the play "possesses the nostalgic appeal of a classic sitcom, it is also hampered by some of the genre’s standard flaws. A subplot about Franco’s gambling debts feels contrived, like one of those dubious byways cooked up by writers in the later seasons of a series, when inspiration flags and the characters’ interactions have begun to go stale. The ancillary characters... might have come straight from the Sidekicks, Neighbors and Friends rack, although the excellent actors imbue them all with a sharp specificity. The relationship at the heart of the play, between Arthur and Franco, is also not without its formulaic aspects. Mr. Letts's depiction of this budding cross-racial, cross-generational friendship feels a little retrograde, as both Arthur and Franco reveal dimensions that confound each other but help ease the awkwardness between them... But Mr. Letts treads gently, underplaying the surrogate-son aspect of their dynamic."

Jon Michael Hill was nominated for the 2010 Tony Award for Best Performance by a Featured Actor in a Play for his work in this play.

== TV series ==
In January 2016, CBS ordered a television pilot based on the play, with Bob Daily as the showrunner. On February 9, 2016, it was reported that Jermaine Fowler would play Franco. On March 1, 2016, Brian d'Arcy James was cast as Arthur. On May 26, 2016, CBS ordered the series to be re-piloted for a mid-season premiere.

In September 2016, CBS ordered the TV series, which debuted on February 2, 2017. Judd Hirsch played the role of the shop owner. Other cast members include Jermaine Fowler, Katey Sagal, David Koechner, Maz Jobrani, Anna Baryshnikov, Darien Sills-Evans, and Rell Battle. On May 12, 2018, the series was cancelled after 2 seasons.

== Awards and nominations ==
=== 2008 Chicago production ===
Year	Award	Category	Work	Result	Ref.
2008	Jeff Award	Outstanding Production – Play – Large		Nominated	
2008	Jeff Award	Outstanding New Work		Nominated	
2008	Jeff Award	Outstanding Actor in a Principal Role - Play	Jon Michael Hill	Nominated	
2009	American Theatre Critics Association Award	Harold and Mimi Steinberg/ATCA New Play Award	Tracy Letts	Nominated	

=== 2009 Broadway production ===
Year	Award	Category	Work	Result	Ref.
2010	Tony Award	Best Performance by a Featured Actor in a Play	Jon Michael Hill	Nominated	
2010	Outer Critics Circle Award	Outstanding New Broadway Play		Nominated	
2010	Outer Critics Circle Award	Outstanding Featured Actor in a Play	Jon Michael Hill	Won	
2010	Drama League Award	Distinguished Performance	Jon Michael Hill	Nominated	
