= Franz Klainsek =

American multidisciplinary artist

Franz Klainsek is an American multidisciplinary artist of Cuban and Austrian descent. He began his career as a painter before developing a practice encompassing sculpture, installation, and performance.

== Career ==
Klainsek has exhibited internationally, including at Art Basel Miami and Pinta Miami, where he was featured in Ad Astra, a section dedicated to large-scale installations. He has also presented gallery exhibitions in New York and Mexico City.

In 2019, HG Contemporary in New York presented his solo exhibition Chains, featuring copper wall sculptures and a chain installation.

The site-specific exhibition Liberación (2019–2020) occupied the historic Partido Popular Socialista building on Álvaro Obregón Avenue in the Roma Norte neighbourhood of Mexico City. The exhibition comprised seven rooms incorporating sculpture, painting, installation, and performance.

In February 2020, Klainsek presented a talk titled "In Love With the Process" as part of TEDxBosqueDeChapultepec, published on TED.com.

The permanent land art installation Sun Dance (2021) is located in Tamaulipas, Mexico. Constructed from cement and weather-resistant steel, the work engages the surrounding desert landscape.

Also in 2021, Klainsek presented the solo exhibition PRAY at the Museo de los Pintores Oaxaqueños (MUPO) in Oaxaca City. The immersive installation featured over 100,000 individually painted gold nails arranged across the museum floor.

== Artist practice ==
Klainsek's practice encompasses painting, copper sculpture, large-scale installation, and performance. He began his career as a painter before developing an interest in unconventional materials and processes. His copper works are made using an axe, a process he has described as a way of bringing full physical and mental commitment to the act of creation. His installations frequently incorporate large quantities of individually balanced gold nails. Recurring themes across his work include freedom, truth, and the effects of social conditioning on the individual.
