= Bill O'Neill (clown) =

American actor, writer, and clown

Bill O'Neill on the Universal Lot during the taping of Newlyweds in 2026

Bill O'Neill is an American actor, writer, and clown based in Los Angeles, California.

== Career ==
As a writer and clown, he is known for his stage shows The Amazing Banana Brothers and The Underground Monk Show. The Amazing Banana Brothers saw him nominated as Best Comedy Newcomer at the 2023 Edinburgh Fringe Festival.

He is a series regular as Arvid on the NBC sitcom Newlyweds. Newlyweds series co-creator Gail Lerner saw Bill O'neill doing a 5 minute set at a clown show and was immediately struck by his “physical virtuosity and constant invention.” Aramide Tinubu praised his performance in Variety: "O’Neill has perfect comedic timing, throwing himself into every aspect of the character's physical comedy with energetic vibrancy."

He has performed on NCIS: Los Angeles and in the movies Street Fighter and The Running Man. He has also been featured in a national ad campaign for Wendy's. He has extensive training in physical theater, improv, and clown performance.
