= Pass Over (play) =

2017 play by Antoinette Nwandu

- Written by: Antoinette Chinonye Nwandu
- Characters: Moses; Kitch

Premiere
- Place: Steppenwolf Theatre Company
- Directed by: Danya Taymor

Pass Over is a play by American playwright Antoinette Nwandu. It was inspired by Waiting for Godot by Samuel Beckett and the Book of Exodus, it was written to shed light on the violence on young African American men. Nwandu began writing the play in 2012, after the killing of Trayvon Martin. Pass Over premiered in May 2017 at Steppenwolf Theatre Company in Chicago. It was recorded live and made into a film adaptation by directors Danya Taymor and Spike Lee, and released on Amazon Prime on April 20, 2018. Pass Over was the first play to premiere on Broadway after the COVID-19 pandemic.

== Synopsis ==
=== Act One ===
Passover opens on a lamp post on a ghetto street in current day, but also on 1855 plantation, and also in 13th century BCE Egypt, with Moses just waking up with his friend Kitch watching over him. Moses tells Kitch about how he's finally going to get off the block and the two talk about what their "promised land" will look like. Moses and Kitch talk about the people they know that have been killed by the "po-pos." They talk about the food they will eat, and play games until they are interrupted. Mister appears with a basket full of food that he was bringing to his ill mother. He has gotten completely lost and is so late and tired he decides to not go see her. Moses and Kitch let him rest on the block and Mister offers them the food, the food that they have been dreaming of. The three chat amongst themselves until Mister points how much they use the "n-word", and says that if he can't use it, neither should they. Moses tells him he can't say it because it is not his word. Mister then proclaims that everything is his and makes a hasty exit, but not before Kitch takes his apple pie. The two talk about what just occurred and practice imitating Mister in case a "po-po" shows up. Ossifer then appears and they put their disguise in motion. At first, it works, but after a slip up Ossifer starts harassing and berating them. Moses gives into Ossifer's remarks and he lets them go. They live another day, and now that they are still alive, they can leave the block.

=== Act Two ===
Act two opens the following night, with Moses waking up and Kitch keeping watch as the night before. Despite Moses's wishes, he gives into Kitch by playing the same games as the night before as they talk about what they will have once they "pass over." They list the people they know that have been killed by the "po-pos." Moses comes to the decision that the only way to pass over is for them to kill themselves. He asks Kitch to hit him over the head with a rock. Kitch protests because no one will be there to kill him, so they agree to make the first hit soft enough to survive long enough to kill the other one. As Kitch winds up to hit Moses, Ossifer appears. Ossifer goes back to harassing the two and frisking them, when Moses takes a stand against him and asks for Ossifer to kill him. When Ossifer realizes he cannot hold power over Moses with violence anymore, he turns his violence onto Kitch. Then the space changes. Moses now has the power. He uses the "plagues" against Ossifer and takes all the power from him, leaving him unable to do anything. Moses then purges the evil out of Ossifer. Ossifer lets the men go and leaves a husk. The sun rises and the two celebrate. As they are leaving the block, Mister appears. Mister doesn't recognize them and pulls out a gun, and kills Moses. The play ends with a monologue from Mister, and Moses not getting off the block.

== Characters ==
- Moses — A young, sad, angry, courageous black man from the ghetto with a name to live up to. But, also a slave driver, but also the prophesied leader of God's chosen people.
- Kitch — A young, loving, and kind black man from the ghetto who is Moses's best friend. But, also a slave, but also one of God's chosen people.
- Mister — A slightly older, earnest, wholesome, and terrified white man who is not from around here. His name, Master, has been passed down to him from his family. But, also a plantation owner, but also Pharaoh's son.
- Ossifer — An intimidating yet terrified white man, around Mister's age, who is a law enforcer. Not from around here, but always here. But, also a patroller, but also in the Pharaoh's army.
