= William O'Neill =

William, Billy or Bill O'Neill may refer to:

== Media ==
- Bill O'Neill (clown) American actor and comedian
- Bill O'Neill (media) (born 1936), News Corporation executive

== Politics ==
- Bill O'Neill (Ohio politician), former member of the Ohio House of Representatives
- Bill O'Neill (New Mexico politician) (1956–2025), member of the New Mexico Senate
- C. William O'Neill (1916–1978), governor of Ohio
- William O'Neill (Ohio judge) (born 1947), appellate judge and 2008 candidate for U.S. Representative from Ohio's 14th congressional district
- William A. O'Neill (1930–2007), governor of Connecticut, 1980–1991
- William G. O'Neill (1921–1996), member of the Florida House of Representatives
- William P. O'Neill (1874–1955), lieutenant governor of Indiana

== Sports ==
- Bill O'Neill (American football) (1910–2000), American football player
- Bill O'Neill (baseball) (1880–1920), American baseball player
- Bill O'Neill (bowler) (born 1981), American professional ten-pin bowler
- Bill O'Neill (bowls) (1909–?), New Zealand lawn bowler
- Billy O'Neill (rugby) (1878–1955), Welsh rugby player
- William O'Neill (rugby union), Irish rugby union player
- Bill O'Neill (ice hockey) (born 1956), American college men's ice hockey coach
- Billy O'Neill (dual player) (1929–2015), Irish former Gaelic football and hurler
- Billy O'Neill (footballer) (born 1919), Irish footballer
- Willie O'Neill (footballer, born 1940) (1940–2011), Scottish footballer (Celtic FC)
- Willie O'Neill (Wexford hurler) (born 1945), Irish hurler
- Willie O'Neill (Cork hurler) (1876–1963), Irish hurler and Gaelic footballer
- Willie O'Neill (Irish footballer) (1916–1978), Irish international footballer

== Others ==
- Buckey O'Neill (1860–1898), Old West sheriff and U.S. Army officer killed at the Battle of San Juan Hill
- William F. O'Neil, founder of General Tire and Rubber Company
- William O'Neill, 1st Baron O'Neill (1813–1883), Anglo-Irish hereditary peer, clergyman and musical composer
- William O'Neill (Medal of Honor) (c. 1848–?), American soldier in the Indian Wars

== See also ==
- William O'Neil (disambiguation)
- Will O'Neill (disambiguation)
- Bill O'Neal, American historian; see Bibliography of Wyoming history
- Billy O'Neil, fictional footballer in Dream Team
- William O'Neal (disambiguation)
