= John Proctor Is the Villain =

2022 stage play by Kimberly Belflower

- Broadway Promotional Poster
- Original language: English
- Written by: Kimberly Belflower
- Genre: Dramedy
- Setting: Rural Georgia, 2018

Premiere
- Date: April 27, 2022
- Place: Studio Theatre, Washington D.C.

John Proctor Is the Villain is a stage play written by American playwright Kimberly Belflower. It is a revisionist take on the classic American play The Crucible by Arthur Miller, centering on a group of modern-day high school students and their interpretation of the historical events the play is based on.

According to annual data released by American Theater magazine, John Proctor Is the Villain is the most-produced play of the 2026-27 season, with 20 professional productions nationwide.

== Summary ==
John Proctor Is the Villain is set in a high-school classroom in a small, rural Georgia town in 2018. Carter Smith is the English teacher for several 11th-graders—the straight-A student Beth, the new transfer student Nell, the wealthy girl Ivy, the pastor's daughter Raelynn, the slightly awkward Mason, and Raelynn's boyfriend Lee. Mr. Smith assigns the students the play The Crucible, the protagonist of which is John Proctor, who was convicted of witchcraft during the Salem witch trials. Beth forms the school's feminist club, with Mr. Smith as its sponsor. Tensions rise when Raelynn's estranged friend Shelby returns to school after a prolonged absence. During the semester, Ivy's father is accused of sexual harassment during the #MeToo movement, a source of controversy in the small town, causing her to withdraw from the club. Lee tries to repair his relationship with Raelynn (having cheated on her with Shelby). Miss Gallagher, the school's guidance counselor, mediates various issues between Mr. Smith and the students. Over the course of the year, the class discusses The Crucible's themes of power, gender inequality, and female sexuality. In a tense class period, Shelby loudly disagrees with Mr. Smith's insistence that John Proctor is a good man, and announces that Mr. Smith had been sexually abusing her over the last year.

The accusation causes waves throughout the town. Despite her feminist ideals, Beth deeply admires Mr. Smith and is reluctant to believe Shelby, further straining relations among the girls. Nell and Mason grow closer, but Mason insults Shelby's perceived promiscuity, causing her to take off. Raelynn, her reluctant assigned partner for an interpretative project based on the play, follows her and the two reconcile. Shelby admits that Mr. Smith's abuse of power had left her feeling vulnerable, which is why she slept with Lee. Mr. Smith is allowed to continue teaching and turns his attentions to Beth. On the day of the project presentation, Ms. Gallagher, who has been assigned by the school board to supervise Mr. Smith's class, reveals to him she has been aware of rumors of his predatory behavior since college. Raelynn and Shelby, acting as Elizabeth Proctor and Abigail Williams from the play, imagine a world where their actions are not defined by the men in their lives. They begin dancing, echoing Abigail's dance in the woods. Mr. Smith angrily attempts to stop the performance, but the girls' cathartic dance is supported by Nell, Mason, and Ms. Gallagher. In the final moments of the dance, Beth stands from her desk and takes a step towards the girls; the lights go out, leaving the audience to wonder if Beth joins them.

John Proctor Is the Villain includes several songs by pop artists such as Lorde and Taylor Swift. In some productions, these songs are performed in between scenes, as well as before the first scene and during the last scene. The Broadway production used ominous sounds and flickering lights to denote the transitions between each scene. Belflower received permission to use excerpts from The Crucible from Arthur Miller's estate.

== Notable casts ==
Character	Washington D.C.	Boston	Broadway	London
Character	2022	2024	2025	2026
Shelby Holcomb	Juliana Sass	Isabel Van Natta	Sadie Sink	Sadie Soverall
Mr. Carter Smith	Dave Register	Japhet Balaban	Gabriel Ebert	Dónal Finn
Miss Bailey Gallagher	Lida Maria Benson	Olivia Hebert	Molly Griggs	Molly McFadden
Beth Powell	Miranda Rizzolo	Jules Talbot	Fina Strazza	Holly Howden Gilchrist
Nell Shaw	Deidre Staples	Victoria Omoregie	Morgan Scott	Lauryn Ajufo
Ivy Watkins	Resa Mishina	Brianna Martinez	Maggie Kuntz	Clare Hughes
Raelynn Nix	Jordan Slattery	Haley Wong	Amalia Yoo	Miya James
Mason Adams	Ignacio Diaz-Silverio	Maanav Aryan Goyal	Nihar Duvvuri	Reece Braddock
Lee Turner	Zachary Keller	Benjamin Izaak	Hagan Oliveras	Charlie Borg

== Production history ==
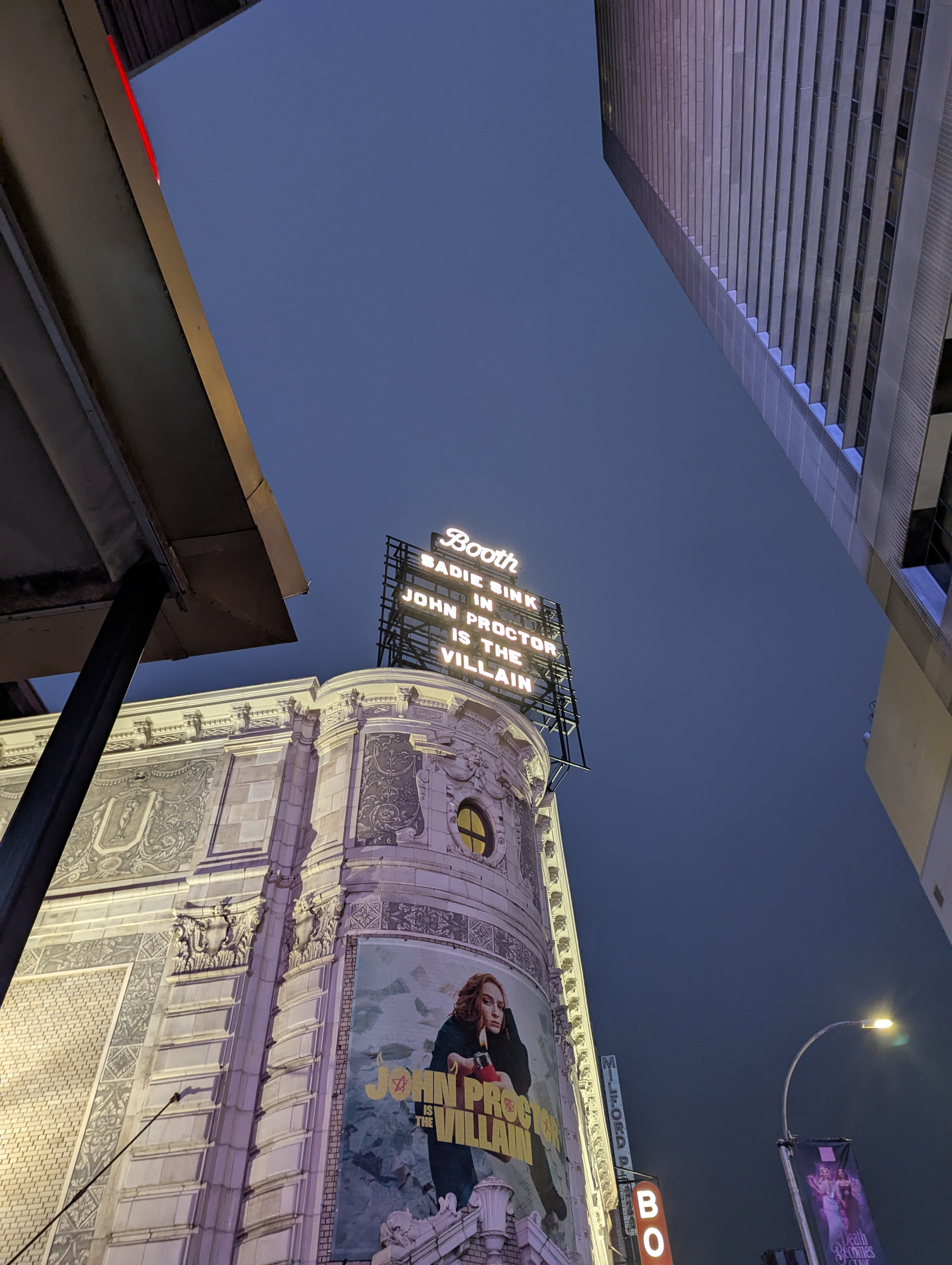
John Proctor Is the Villain signage at the Booth Theater on Broadway

=== Developmental workshops and productions (2018-2019) ===
The play was originally commissioned by The Farm Theater for their College Collaboration Project and first workshopped in 2018 and 2019 in three colleges theatre departments: Centre College in Danville, Kentucky, Furman University in Greenville, South Carolina, and Rollins College in Winter Park, Florida. The play was also workshopped as part of the Ojai Playwrights Conference's New Works Festival in 2019.

=== Washington, D.C. (2022) ===
The play was first professionally produced by Studio Theatre in Washington D.C in 2022, running from April 27 until June 5, directed by Marti Lyons. Since then, it has been performed by various small theaters and colleges in the DMV area, including Georgetown University's Mask and Bauble Dramatic Society in 2023, until its Broadway premiere in 2025.

=== Boston (2024) ===
In 2024, another production was staged at the Huntington Theatre Company in Boston, running from February 8 until March 10, directed by Margot Bordelon. The Boston production was nominated for six Elliot Norton Awards, winning Outstanding Play, Large; and Outstanding Ensemble.

=== Broadway (2025) ===
The play premiered on Broadway in 2025, directed by Danya Taymor and starring Sadie Sink. Previews began on March 20, 2025, with an opening date of April 14, 2025 at the Booth Theatre. The show opened to positive reviews and received seven Tony Award nominations, including Best Play. Before the play officially opened, its run was extended by two weeks to July 6, then by another week to July 13. That June, the play's run was extended again to August 31, with Chiara Aurelia replacing Sink in the role of Shelby Holcomb after July 13. The show ended its Broadway run on September 7, 2025.

=== London (2026) ===
The play made its European premiere at London's Royal Court Theatre from March 20, running for a limited engagement until April 25, 2026. The entire Broadway creative team reunited, while a whole new cast was formed for this production. It received critical acclaim and sold out its entire engagement.

The cast included Holly Howden Gilchrist, Lauryn Ajufo, Dónal Finn and Sadie Soverall.

A further run will take place in London, after Gilchrist takes part in a play in Glasgow.

=== West End (2027) ===
The play is set to transfer to the Wyndham’s Theatre in the West End for a limited 12-week engagement from February 2027.

=== Vancouver (2027) ===
The play is set to have its Canadian premiere, directed by Arthi Chandra, at the Arts Club Theatre Company at the Stanley BFL CANADA Stage for a limited engagement from March 11 to April 11, 2027.

== Reception ==
=== Broadway ===
Jesse Green of the New York Times wrote that Belflower "smartly keeps the play from becoming a polemic by moving on several tracks at once" by combining such elements as "pure high school comedy", pop music, and feminist interpretations of classic works. Reviewers for AmNewYork and Vulture wrote that John Proctor Is the Villain was particularly relevant during the second presidency of Donald Trump, during which references to diversity, equity, and inclusion initiatives were being discouraged by the U.S. government. A reviewer for Variety wrote that John Proctor Is the Villain interpreted The Crucible through a feminist lens, "demonstrating the power of feminine solidarity and rage", a sentiment shared by an Entertainment Weekly critic. Another reviewer for The Hollywood Reporter called the storyline "a poignant story of girlhood and empowering friendships". Conversely, a writer for TheWrap described the short scenes as characteristic of novice playwrights, and a New York Daily News writer said: "I wish "John Proctor" made its very fair point about girls forging their own narratives with more ambivalence and less certitude."

=== London ===
Sarah Hemming of the Financial Times described the play as "a joyous, blazingly intelligent play...at once a restless interrogation of the role of art in defining and expressing who we are; a compassionate, funny portrayal of what it means to be a teenage girl; and a furious appraisal of the way power games repeat across generations." Sarah Crompton from WhatsOnStage wrote that the play is "a witty and convincing picture of teenage girlhood, its brightness, hopes and fears." Alice Saville of The Independent wrote that Belflower's play "like The Crucible...shows how quickly new ideas can contaminate a small, contained environment, spreading like penicillin spores on white bread. And this town doesn’t want to take its medicine."j

== Awards and nominations ==
=== 2023 Original production ===
Year	Award	Category	Nominee	Result	Ref.
2023	Helen Hayes Awards	Outstanding Production in a Play	John Proctor Is the Villain	Won	
2023	Helen Hayes Awards	Outstanding Ensemble in a Play	Cast of John Proctor Is the Villain	Won	
2023	Helen Hayes Awards	Charles MacArthur Award for Outstanding New Play or Musical	Kimberly Belflower	Nominated	
2023	Helen Hayes Awards	Outstanding Lead Performer in a Play	Juliana Sass	Nominated	
2023	Helen Hayes Awards	Outstanding Lead Performer in a Play	Jordan Slattery	Nominated	
2023	Helen Hayes Awards	Outstanding Supporting Performer in a Play	Ignacio Diaz-Silverio	Nominated	
2023	Helen Hayes Awards	Outstanding Supporting Performer in a Play	Deidre Staples	Nominated	
2023	Helen Hayes Awards	Outstanding Direction in a Play	Marti Lyons	Nominated	
2023	Helen Hayes Awards	Outstanding Lighting Design	Jesse Belsky	Nominated	
2023	Helen Hayes Awards	Outstanding Set Design	Luciana Stecconi	Nominated	
2023	Helen Hayes Awards	Outstanding Sound Design	Kathy Ruvuna	Nominated	

=== 2024 Boston production ===
Year	Award	Category	Nominee	Result	Ref.
2024	Elliot Norton Awards	Outstanding Play	John Proctor Is the Villain	Won	
2024	Elliot Norton Awards	Outstanding Ensemble	Cast of John Proctor Is the Villain	Won	
2024	Elliot Norton Awards	Outstanding Featured Performance in a Play	Jules Talbot	Nominated	
2024	Elliot Norton Awards	Outstanding Featured Performance in a Play	Isabel Van Natta	Nominated	
2024	Elliot Norton Awards	Outstanding Featured Performance in a Play	Haley Wong	Nominated	
2024	Elliot Norton Awards	Outstanding Director	Margot Bordelon	Nominated	

=== 2025 Broadway production ===
Year	Award	Category	Nominee	Result	Ref.
2025	Tony Awards	Best Play		Nominated	
2025	Tony Awards	Best Actress in a Play	Sadie Sink	Nominated	
2025	Tony Awards	Best Featured Actress in a Play	Fina Strazza	Nominated	
2025	Tony Awards	Best Featured Actor in a Play	Gabriel Ebert	Nominated	
2025	Tony Awards	Best Direction of a Play	Danya Taymor	Nominated	
2025	Tony Awards	Best Lighting Design of a Play	Natasha Katz and Hannah Wasileski	Nominated	
2025	Tony Awards	Best Sound Design of a Play	Palmer Hefferan	Nominated	
2025	Drama Desk Awards	Outstanding Play		Nominated	
2025	Drama Desk Awards	Outstanding Featured Performance in a Play	Amalia Yoo	Won	
2025	Drama Desk Awards	Outstanding Direction of a Play	Danya Taymor	Won	
2025	Drama Desk Awards	Outstanding Lighting Design of a Play	Natasha Katz	Nominated	
2025	Drama League Awards	Outstanding Production of a Play		Nominated	
2025	Drama League Awards	Outstanding Direction of a Play	Danya Taymor	Nominated	
2025	Dorian Awards	Outstanding Broadway Play		Won	
2025	Dorian Awards	Outstanding Lead Performance in a Broadway Play	Sadie Sink	Nominated	
2025	Dorian Awards	Outstanding Featured Performance in a Broadway Play	Fina Strazza	Won	
2025	Dorian Awards	Outstanding Featured Performance in a Broadway Play	Amalia Yoo	Nominated	
2025	Dorian Awards	Outstanding Broadway Ensemble	Ensemble	Won	
2025	Dorian Awards	Broadway Showstopper Award	"Green Light" dance sequence	Nominated	
2025	Outer Critics Circle Awards	Outstanding New Broadway Play		Won	
2025	Outer Critics Circle Awards	Outstanding Direction of a Play	Danya Taymor	Won	

== Film adaptation ==
On July 18, 2025, it was announced that Universal Pictures successfully outbid other studios for the rights to the play, which will be adapted by Belflower into a feature film. Tina Fey, Eric Gurian, Marc Platt, Adam Siegel and Jared LeBoff are producing, and actress Sadie Sink is an executive producer. Taymor, who directed the original play, signed on as director.
