= William O'Neil (disambiguation) =

William O'Neil (1933–2023) was an American businessman and stockbroker.

William O'Neil may also refer to:

- William O'Neil (Wisconsin politician) (1848–1917), American politician
- William A. O'Neil (1927–2019), Canadian civil servant, Secretary-General of the International Maritime Organization
- William T. O'Neil (1850–1909), American politician from New York

== See also ==
- William O'Neal (disambiguation)
- William O'Neill (disambiguation)
