= Kimberly Belflower =

American playwright (born 1987)

- Belflower in 2026
- Born: June 22, 1987 (age 39); Appalachian Georgia
- Education: Columbus State University (2009), University of Texas in Austin (2017)
- Occupation: Playwright
- Known for: Broadway play John Proctor is the Villain

Kimberly Belflower is an American playwright (born on June 22, 1987). She is best known for writing the Broadway play John Proctor is the Villain, for which she was nominated for the Tony Award for Best Play at the 2025 Tony Awards.

== Early life and education ==
Belflower is from a small town in Appalachian Georgia. She earned an MFA from University of Texas in Austin in 2017.

== Career ==
Belflower teaches playwriting at Emory University.

Belflower's play Lost Girl premiered at the Milwaukee Rep in 2018 and went on to win the Kennedy Center Darrell Ayers National Playwriting Award.

Belflower began writing John Proctor is the Villain shortly after graduating from University of Texas in Austin in 2017. She was inspired by Stacy Schiff's book The Witches: Salem, 1692 as well as the #MeToo movement. The play is a revisionist take on the American classic play The Crucible by Arthur Miller, centering on a group of modern-day high school students and their interpretation of the historical events the play is based on. John Proctor is the Villain was commissioned by The Farm Theater’s College Collaboration Project and developed with Centre College, Rollins College and Furman University and workshopped as part of the 2019 Ojai Playwrights Conference’s New Works Festival. The play had its premiere at the Studio Theatre in Washington, DC in 2022. It transferred to Broadway in 2025 directed by Danya Taymor and featuring Sadie Sink. The production received mostly positive reviews and was nominated for four Drama Desk awards and seven Tony Awards.

Belflower's Saint Pigtail was commissioned by the Studio Theatre and was a 2023 finalist for the National Playwrights Conference at the Eugene O'Neill Theater Center.

In 2025, it was announced that Belflower's play, John Proctor Is the Villain, would be adapted into a film.

On June 23, 2026, Belflower's new play Born in the Dirt was announced as part of the Lincoln Center Theater's 2026-2027 season for a 10-week run commencing April 14, 2027. The play will be directed by Tony-Award winner Danya Taymor.

== Select Works ==
- Lost Girl
- Saint Pigtail
- Teen Girl FANtasies / Only Reason
- Forest Creature
- The Use of Wildflowers
- Casey Brown's Clown Town
- The Sky Game
- Gondal
- Chronic Fatigue
- John Proctor Is the Villain
- Born in the Dirt
