= Studio Theatre (Washington, D.C.) =

Theater production company in Washington, D.C., U.S.

Coordinates: 38°54′35.4″N 77°1′53.8″W

The Studio Theatre
- Theatre Logo
- Formation: 1978
- Type: Theatre group
- Purpose: Contemporary Theatre
- Location: 1501 14th Street NW, Washington DC
- Artistic director: David Muse
- Notable members: Joy Zinoman, Founding Artistic Director
- Website: http://www.studiotheatre.org/

The Studio Theatre is a non-profit theater production company located in the 14th Street corridor of Washington, D.C. It produces contemporary plays in a four-stage complex. Stages include the Metheny, the Mead and Milton, and Stage 4, a black box.

== History ==
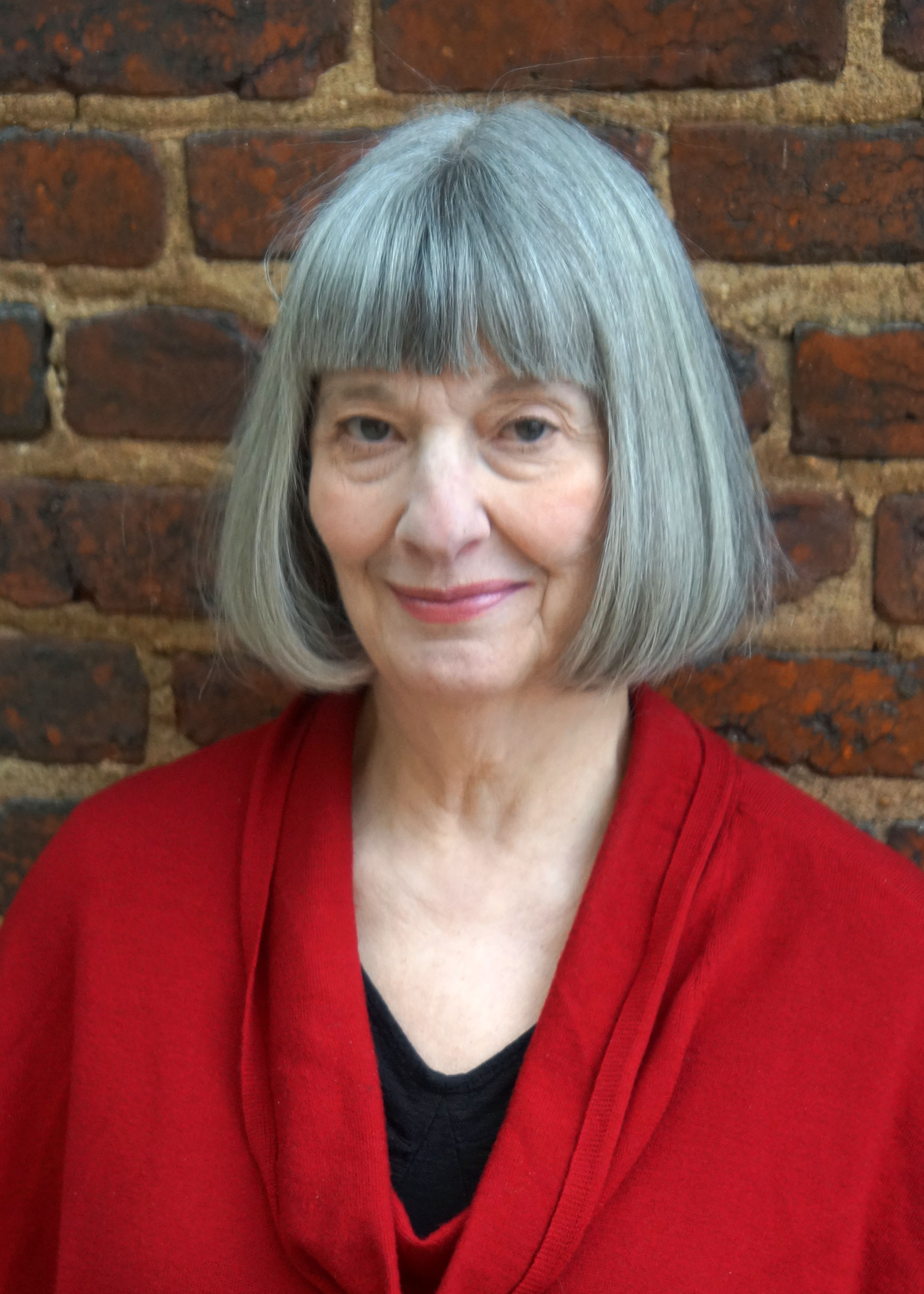
Joy Zinoman, the Founding Artistic Director of the Studio Theatre, Washington D.C.

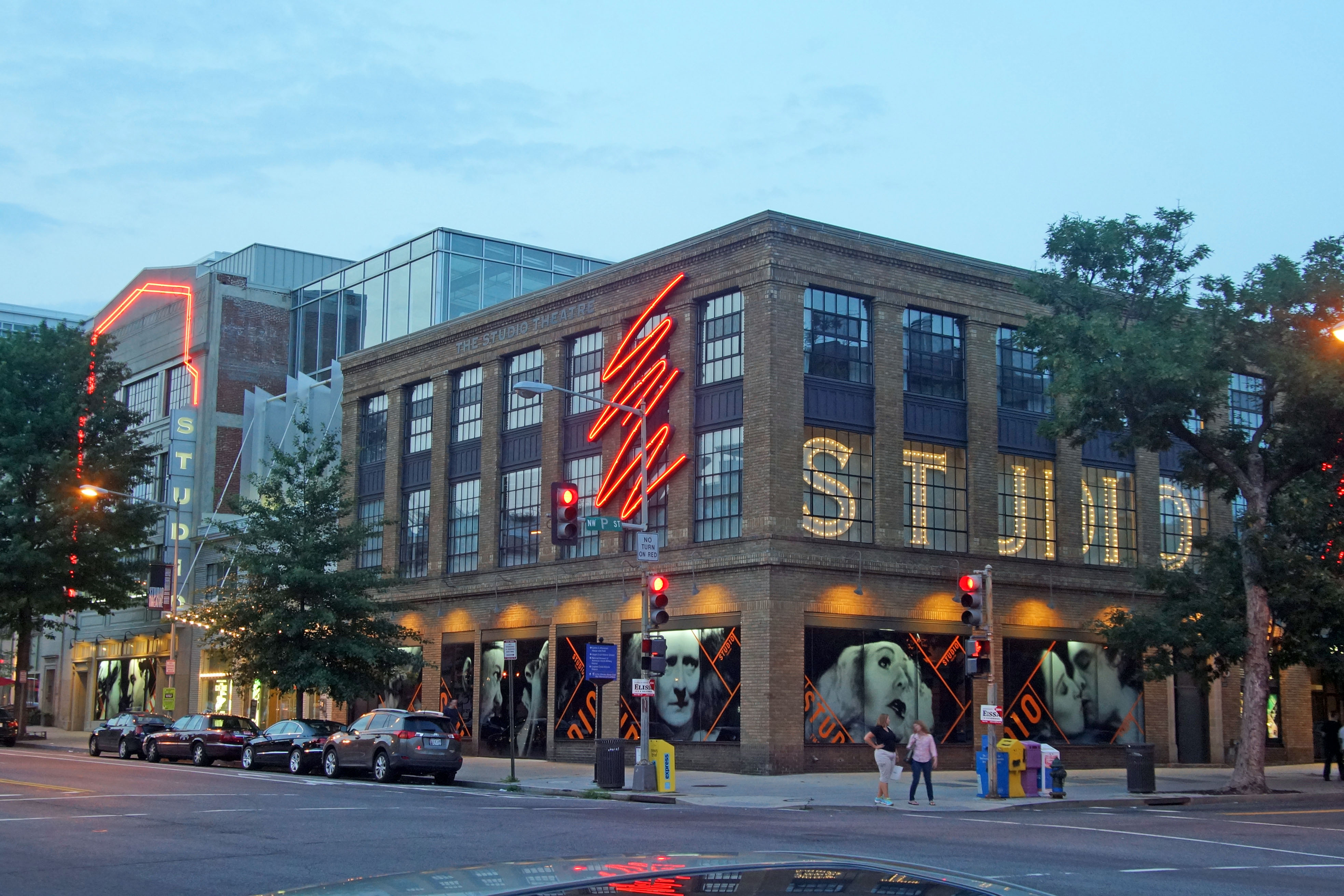
Exterior of the Studio Theatre in Washington DC, taken from the southwest corner of 14th & P streets NW during evening twilight

In 1988, the Studio Theatre started its "2nd Stage" production series to provide opportunities for emerging and established local and national artists to share their talents.

== Facilities ==
Studio Theatre contains three main venues: the Metheny, the Mead, and the Milton. All three are thrust stages and seat approximately 200 people each. They were designed by co-founder Russell Metheny "to foster an intimate connection between actor and audience". The fourth venue, Stage 4, is a flexible black box theater, used primarily for the former Studio 2ndStage and most recently Studio X.

== Notable events ==
Washingtonian magazine, as part of its 50th anniversary commemoration, identified the Studio Theatre's move into its current space at 14th and P streets as one of "50 Moments That Shaped Washington, DC".

== Awards ==
Studio Theatre has been nominated for a total of 398 Helen Hayes Awards, winning 75 awards.

2023 Helen Hayes Awards

- Outstanding Production in a Play—Hayes: John Proctor is the Villain
- Outstanding Ensemble in a Play—Hayes: John Proctor is the Villain

2019 Helen Hayes Awards

- Outstanding Ensemble in a Play—Hayes: The Wolves
- Outstanding Choreography in a Play—Hayes: Stephanie Paul, The Wolves

2018 Helen Hayes Awards

- Robert Prosky Award for Outstanding Lead Actor in a Play—Hayes: Ted van Griethuysen, The Father

2017 Helen Hayes Awards

- Robert Prosky Award for Outstanding Lead Actor in a Play—Helen: Tom Patterson, Constellations
- Robert Prosky Award for Outstanding Lead Actor in a Play—Hayes: Liam Forde, Hand to God
- Outstanding Set Design—Hayes: Daniel Conway, Hand to God
- Outstanding Lead Actress in a Play—Helen: Lily Balatincz, Constellations

2016 Helen Hayes Awards

- Outstanding Choreography in a Musical—Helen: Jessica Redish, Silence! The Musical

2015 Helen Hayes Awards

- Outstanding Play—Hayes: Cock
- Outstanding Lead Actress in a Musical—Hayes: Barbara Walsh, Carrie

2014 Helen Hayes Awards

- James MacArthur Award for Outstanding Supporting Actor—Resident Play: Ted van Griethuysen, The Apple Family Cycle

2013 Helen Hayes Awards

- Outstanding Lighting Design—Resident Production: Mary Louise Geiger, Invisible Man
- Outstanding Ensemble—Resident Play: Invisible Man
- Outstanding Director—Resident Play: Christopher McElroen, Invisible Man

2012 Helen Hayes Awards

- Outstanding Lead Actress—Resident Play: Erica Sullivan, Venus in Fur
- Outstanding Supporting Actor—Resident Musical: Matthew DeLorenzo, Pop!

2011 Helen Hayes Awards

- Robert Prosky Award for Outstanding Lead Actor—Resident Play: Johnny Ramey, Superior Donuts

2009 Helen Hayes Awards

- Outstanding Resident Play: Blackbird
- Outstanding Lead Actress—Resident Play: Lisa Joyce, Blackbird

2008 Helen Hayes Awards

- Outstanding Resident Musical: Reefer Madness
- Outstanding Lead Actress—Resident Play: Nancy Robinette, Souvenir
- Outstanding Lead Actor—Resident Play: J. Fred Shiffman, Souvenir
- Outstanding Director—Resident Musical: Keith Alan Baker, Reefer Madness
- Outstanding Costume Design—Resident Production: Reggie Ray, Souvenir

2007 Helen Hayes Awards

- Outstanding Resident Musical: Caroline, or Change
- Outstanding Lead Actress—Resident Musical: Julia Nixon, Caroline, or Change

== See also ==
- List of theaters in Washington, D.C.
