= Danya Taymor =

American theatre director

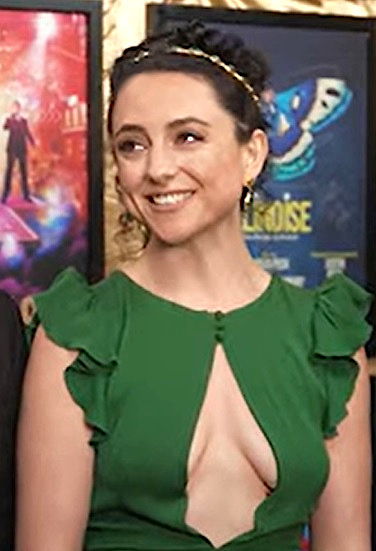
- Taymor at 77th Tony Awards 2024
- Born: October 20, 1988 (age 37); New York City
- Occupation: Stage director
- Partner: Gabriel Ebert
- Relatives: Julie Taymor

Danya Taymor is an American theatre director. She became the youngest woman to win the Tony Award for Best Direction of a Musical for The Outsiders. Taymor received a second nomination the following year in the Best Direction of a Play category for John Proctor Is the Villain.

== Early life ==
Taymor grew up in Palo Alto, California. Her mother works as a psychiatrist and her father is a pediatrician. Her aunt is Julie Taymor, who became the first woman to win the Tony Award for Best Direction of a Musical, for The Lion King. She first began acting in the theater at the age of 6.

Taymor attended Palo Alto High School. She also studied at Duke University, graduating in 2010 from the Trinity College of Arts and Sciences.

== Career ==
After graduating from college, Taymor relocated to New York and worked as an assistant for her aunt, who was then directing Spider-Man:Turn Off the Dark. She also worked with other directors and studied in programs at The Flea Theater and Lincoln Center Theater. Taymor was assistant director on the 2015 Broadway production of Helen Edmundson's adaptation of Thérèse Raquin at Studio 54. She later had her solo directorial debut on Broadway with Antoinette Chinonye Nwandu’s Pass Over, which premiered in 2021 at the August Wilson Theatre.

Taymor directed the premiere of the musical The Outsiders at La Jolla Playhouse in 2023. The production transferred to Broadway the following year, opening at the Bernard B. Jacobs Theatre on April 11, 2024. For her work, Taymor received the Tony Award for Best Direction of a Musical, becoming the youngest woman to do so. In her speech, Taymor recognized the other five female nominees in play and musical direction, which marked a record at the time.

On April 14, 2025, Kimberly Belflower's play John Proctor is the Villain opened at the Booth Theatre directed by Taymor. The production, starring Sadie Sink, was nominated for 7 Tony Awards at the 78th Tony Awards—including Taymor herself for her direction—ultimately winning none. The play also received generally positive reviews from critics. Performances ran until September 7. In January 2026, Taymor was announced as the director of the upcoming film adaptation of the play. She also went on to direct the play's West End production, which opened in March 2026.

In summer 2025, Taymor directed the American premiere of Emmanuelle Mattana's Trophy Boys starring Louisa Jacobson at MCC Theater. The play ran from June to August 2025.

On June 10, 2026, it was announced that Taymor would direct an Off-Broadway revival of the 2006 coming-of-age rock musical Spring Awakening at Studio Seaview. Choreographer Celia Rowlson-Hall and music supervisor Or Matias are also attached to the project. Around 2,500 people attended the July open-call auditions.

In June 2026, Taymor was also announced as the director of Belflower's new play Born in the Dirt for the Lincoln Center Theater's 2026-2027 season. The production is scheduled for a 10-week run commencing April 14, 2027.

== Personal life ==
She is married to actor Gabriel Ebert. Ebert featured in Taymor's production of John Proctor is the Villain, for which he was nominated for the Tony Award for Best Featured Actor in a Play.

== Theatre credits ==
Year	Title	Role	Venue	Ref.
2012	I Hate Fucking Mexicans	Director	Off-Broadway, Flea Theatre	
2012	Wrench	Director	Off-Broadway, The Tank @ 46th Street	
2014	My Daughter Keeps Our Hammer	Director	Off-Broadway, Flea Theatre	
2014	The Mysteries	Associate Director	Off-Broadway, Flea Theatre	
2015	Wyoming	Director	Off-Broadway, Lesser America	
2015	Thérèse Raquin	Assistant Director	Broadway, Studio 54	
2016	In Quietness	Director	Off-Broadway, Dutch Kills Theater Company	
2016	The Place We Built	Director	Off-Broadway, Flea Theatre	
2016	The Sensuality Party	Director	Off-Broadway, The New Group	
2016	Asking for Trouble	Director	Off-Broadway, Ensemble Studio Theatre	
2017	Pass Over	Director	Regional, Steppenwolf Theatre	
2018	Queens	Director	Off-Broadway, Lincoln Center Theatre	
2018	Pass Over	Director	Off-Broadway, Lincoln Center Theatre	
2018	Familiar	Director	Regional, Steppenwolf Theatre	
2019	"Daddy"	Director	Off-Broadway, The Pershing Square Signature Center	
2019	Heroes of the Fourth Turning	Director	Off-Broadway, Playwrights Horizons	
2020	Graveyard Shift	Director	Regional, Goodman Theatre	
2021	Pass Over	Director	Broadway, August Wilson Theatre	
2022	"Endgame" Samuel Beckett	Director	Gate Theatre Dublin	
2022	"Daddy" A Melodrama	Director	West End, Almeida Theatre	
2022	Evanston Salt Costs Climbing	Director	Off-Broadway, The Pershing Square Signature Center	
2023	The Outsiders	Director	Regional, La Jolla Playhouse	
2024	Jonah	Director	Off-Broadway, Roundabout Theatre Company	
2024	The Outsiders	Director	Broadway, Bernard B. Jacobs Theatre	
2025	John Proctor is the Villain	Director	Broadway, Booth Theatre	
2025	Trophy Boys	Director	Off-Broadway, MCC Theater	
2026	The Outsiders	Director	U.S. National Tour	
2026	John Proctor is the Villain	Director	West End, Royal Court Theatre	
2026	Spring Awakening	Director	Off-Broadway, Studio Seaview	

== Awards and nominations ==
Year	Award	Category	Work	Result	Ref.
2020	Lucille Lortel Awards	Outstanding Director	Heroes of the Fourth Turning	Nominated	
2024	Tony Award	Best Direction of a Musical	The Outsiders	Won	
2024	Drama Desk Award	Outstanding Director of a Musical	The Outsiders	Nominated	
2025	Tony Award	Best Direction of a Play	John Proctor is the Villain	Nominated	
2025	Drama Desk Award	Outstanding Director of a Play	John Proctor is the Villain	Won	
2025	Outer Critics Circle Awards	Outstanding Direction of a Play	John Proctor is the Villain	Won	
2025	Drama League Awards	Outstanding Direction of a Play	John Proctor is the Villain	Nominated	
