= Alexis Lloyd =

French filmmaker

- Born: 1961 (age 64–65)
- Occupations: Screenwriter film director film producer

Alexis Lloyd (born in 1961) is a French screenwriter, film director, and film producer known for his film 30 Beats. He was managing director of Pathé UK.

== Education and early career ==
Lloyd studied literature at the École normale supérieure de lettres et sciences humaines (1981–1984) and public affairs at the Institut d’Etudes Politiques de Paris (Sciences Po) and Ecole nationale d'administration (1986–1988). He holds a Master in Literature and a Master in Law. He served as a civil servant with the Inspection générale des finances (France) from 1988 to 1992 and taught foreign affairs at the Institut d’Etudes Politiques de Paris (Sciences Po).

Lloyd is the co-author with Antoine Winckler of L'Europe en Chantier, a 1993 book on the history of the European Union published by Éditions du Seuil. He also authored several op-ed articles on foreign affairs for the French daily newspaper Libération.

== Pathé UK ==
In 1993, Lloyd began working on film acquisition and development with Claude Berri, Paul Rassam, and Jake Eberts, then on film sets as assistant director in Australia and New York. He moved to London in 1994 to run Guild Entertainment, an independent film distributor, then launched and became managing director of Pathé UK. At Pathé UK, Lloyd supervised the distribution operation, Pathé Distribution, and the production arm, Pathé Pictures, which won one of the three film franchises awarded by the Arts Council of England in May 1997.

During his years at Pathé UK, Lloyd was the executive producer of The Claim, It Was an Accident, There's Only One Jimmy Grimble, Love's Labour's Lost, and The Darkest Light.

As head of Guild Film Distribution and Pathé Distribution, Lloyd oversaw the co-production and distribution of over 90 feature films, including box office hits Stargate, Austin Powers, The Fifth Element, Sleepy Hollow, All About My Mother, The Blair Witch Project, Memento, and Chicken Run. Under his direction, Guild Entertainment and Pathé UK acquired and distributed independent films such as Bound, Basquiat, Swingers, The Spanish Prisoner, Pi, and The Virgin Suicides.

== Screenwriter, director, producer ==
In 2001, Lloyd moved to New York City to work as a screenwriter, director, and producer. His short film Indiscretion (101), shot in New York in 2001, was selected at the Palm Springs International Film Festival and broadcast by France 2. Lloyd's second short Le 10ème Jour was filmed in 2003 in Paris and also broadcast by France 2. His screenplay Octane was part of the 2008 eQuinoxe script selection.

Beginning in the summer of 2009, Lloyd wrote, directed, and produced 30 Beats, his first feature film. The film was shot in New York City with an ensemble cast, including Ingeborga Dapkunaite, Jason Day, Vahina Giocante, Paz de la Huerta, Justin Kirk, Ben Levin, Lee Pace, Condola Rashad, Thomas Sadoski, and Jennifer Tilly. 30 Beats was distributed in the U.S. by Roadside Attractions and in France by Orange Studio, a subsidiary of France Telecom. The financing for the film was structured as a co-production between Latitude 49 Production (a French company) and a group of American and foreign investors. 30 Beats was produced by Worldview Entertainment, with music composed by C.C Adcock. It was released theatrically in the US on July 20, 2012.

== Filmography ==
Year	Film	Credit	Notes
2026	The Schopenhauer Effect	Writer, Director, Producer	Feature Film released by Helix Pictures
2020	Group	Writer, Director, Producer	Web Series aired on YouTube
2012	30 Beats	Writer, Director, Producer	Feature Film released by Roadside Attractions
2005	Indiscretion (101)	Writer, Director, Producer	Short Film aired on France 2
2004	Le 10eme Jour	Writer, Director, Producer	Short Film aired on France 2
2000	The Claim	Executive Producer	Directed by Michael Winterbottom
2000	It Was an Accident	Executive Producer	Directed by Metin Hüseyin
2000	There's Only One Jimmy Grimble	Executive Producer	Directed by John Hay
2000	Love's Labour's Lost	Executive Producer	Directed by Kenneth Branagh
1999	The Darkest Light	Executive Producer	Directed by Simon Beaufoy

== Bibliography ==
- 1993: L'Europe en Chantier (with Antoine Winckler), Éditions du Seuil, (ISBN 978-2010202056)
