= Neil LaBute =

American playwright and filmmaker (born 1963)

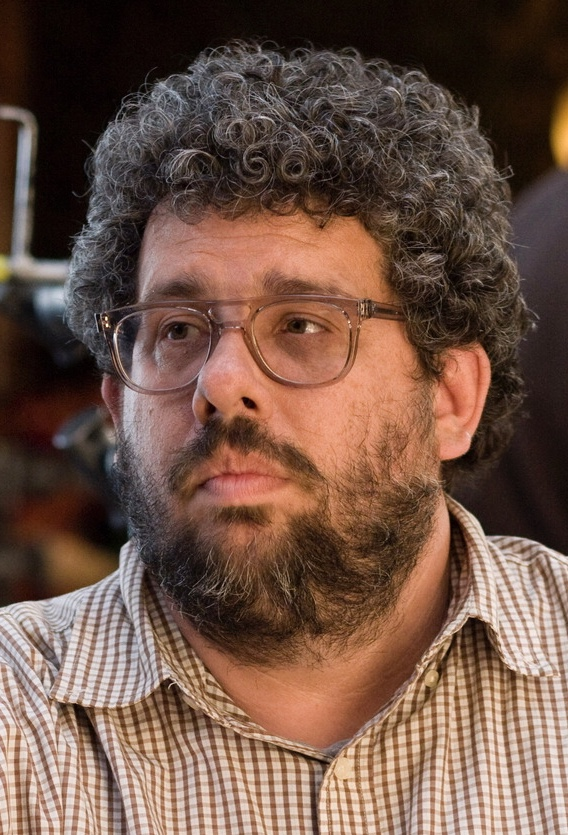
- LaBute in 2010
- Born: Neil N. LaBute; March 19, 1963 (age 63); Detroit, Michigan, U.S.
- Education: Brigham Young University; University of Kansas
- Occupations: Playwright; film director; screenwriter
- Years active: 1992–present
- Spouse: Gia Crovatin (m. 2016)

Neil N. LaBute (born March 19, 1963) is an American playwright, film director, and screenwriter. He is best known for a play which he wrote and later adapted for film, In the Company of Men (1997), winning awards from the Sundance Film Festival, the Independent Spirit Awards, and the New York Film Critics Circle. He wrote and directed the films Your Friends & Neighbors (1998), Possession (2002) (based on the A. S. Byatt novel), The Shape of Things (2003) (based on his play of the same name), The Wicker Man (2006), Some Velvet Morning (2013), and Dirty Weekend (2015).

He directed the films Nurse Betty (2000), Lakeview Terrace (2008), and the American adaptation of Death at a Funeral (2010). LaBute created the TV series Billy & Billie, writing and directing all of the episodes. He is also the creator of the TV series Van Helsing. He executive produced, co-directed, and co-wrote Netflix's The I-Land and he also directed several episodes for shows including Hell on Wheels and Billions.

== Early life ==
LaBute was born in Detroit, the son of Marian, a hospital receptionist, and Richard LaBute, a long-haul truck driver. He is of French Canadian, English, and Irish ancestry, and grew up in Spokane, Washington. He studied theater at Brigham Young University (BYU) in Provo, Utah where he joined the Church of Jesus Christ of Latter-day Saints (LDS Church). At BYU, he also met actor Aaron Eckhart, who later played leading roles in several of his films. LaBute produced a number of plays which pushed the envelope of what was acceptable at the conservative religious university, some of which were shut down after their premieres. However, he also was honored as being one of the "most promising undergraduate playwrights" at the BYU theater department's annual awards. Labute did graduate work at the University of Kansas in Lawrence, New York University in Manhattan, and he participated in a writing workshop at London's Royal Court Theatre.

== Career ==
=== Early career and success ===
LaBute burst onto the theater scene in 1989 with his controversial debut Filthy Talk for Troubled Times. His interest in the film industry came with a viewing of The Soft Skin (La Peau Douce 1964), said the director to Robert K. Elder in a 2011 interview for The Film That Changed My Life.

It exposed me, probably in the earliest way, to "Hey, I could do that." I've never been one to love the camera or even to be as drawn to it as I am to the human aspect of it, and I think it was a film that speaks in a very simple way of here's a way that you can tell a story on film in human terms. It was the kind of film that made me go, 'I could do this; I want to tell stories that are like this and told in this way'.... so it was altering for me in that way, in its simplicity or deceptive simplicity.

In 1993, he returned to BYU to premiere his play In the Company of Men, for which he received an award from the Association for Mormon Letters. He taught drama and film at Indiana University-Purdue Fort Wayne in Fort Wayne, Indiana, in the early 1990s where he adapted and filmed the play, shot over two weeks and costing $25,000, beginning his career as a film director. The film won the Filmmakers Trophy at the Sundance Film Festival, and major awards and nominations at the Deauville Film Festival, the Independent Spirit Awards, the Thessaloniki Film Festival, the Society of Texas Film Critics Awards, and the New York Film Critics Circle.

In the Company of Men portrays two businessmen (one played by Eckhart) cruelly plotting to romance and emotionally destroy a deaf woman. His next film Your Friends & Neighbors (1998), with an ensemble cast including Eckhart and Ben Stiller, received an R-rating due to its portrayal of the sex lives of three yuppie couples in the big city.

His play Bash: Latter-Day Plays is a set of three short plays (Iphigenia in Orem, A Gaggle of Saints, and Medea Redux) depicting essentially good Latter-day Saints doing disturbing and violent things. It ran Off-Broadway at the Douglas Fairbanks Theatre in 1999. Medea Redux is a one-person performance by Calista Flockhart. The play resulted in his being disfellowshipped from the LDS Church (i.e., losing some privileges of church membership without being excommunicated). He has since formally left the LDS Church.

=== Early 21st century ===
In 2001, LaBute wrote and directed the play The Shape of Things, which premièred in London, featuring film actors Paul Rudd and Rachel Weisz. It was turned into a film in 2003 with the same cast and director. Set in a small university town in the Midwest, it focuses on four young students who become emotionally and romantically involved with each other, questioning the nature of art and the lengths to which people will go for love. Weisz's character manipulates Rudd's character into changing everything about himself and discarding his friends in order to become more attractive to her. She even pretends to fall in love with him, prompting an offer of marriage, whereupon she cruelly exposes and humiliates him before an audience, announcing that he has simply been an "art project" for her MFA thesis.

In 2001, LaBute and producer Gail Mutrux founded the Pretty Pictures firm, with a first-look deal at USA Films. LaBute's 2002 play The Mercy Seat was a theatrical response to the September 11, 2001, attacks. Set on September 12, it concerns a man who worked at the World Trade Center but was away from the office during the infamous 2001 terrorist attack – with his mistress. Expecting that his family believes that he was killed in the towers' collapse, he contemplates using the tragedy to run away and start a new life with his lover. Starring Liev Schreiber and Sigourney Weaver, the play was a commercial and critical success. While hesitant to term The Mercy Seat "political theater", Labute said, "I refer to this play in the printed introduction as a kind of emotional terrorism that we wage on those we profess to love." He dedicated the edition to David Hare, in response to Hare's "straightforward, thoughtful, probing work".

His next play, Reasons to Be Pretty, played Off-Broadway from May 14 to July 5, 2008, in a production by MCC Theater at the Lucille Lortel Theatre. It ran on Broadway in 2009, with previews at the Lyceum Theatre beginning March 13, and its opening on April 2. The play was nominated for three 2009 Tony Awards including Best Play, Best Leading Actor in a Play (Thomas Sadoski), and Best Featured Actress in a Play (Marin Ireland), but did not win in any category. The production's final performance was on June 14. In March 2013, the play was mounted at the San Francisco Playhouse in San Francisco.

=== 2010–present ===
In 2010, LaBute directed Death at a Funeral, a remake of a 2007 British film of the same name. It was written by Dean Craig (who also wrote the original screenplay) and starred Chris Rock. Throughout the decade, various productions of his existing works were mounted as he continued to produce new material. He wrote new scenes and an introduction for the Chicago Shakespeare Theater production of The Taming of the Shrew by William Shakespeare which ran from April 7 to June 6, 2010. LaBute framed the classic play in overtly metatheatrical terms, adding a lesbian romance subplot. His short play, The Unimaginable, premiered as part of the Terror 2010 season at the Southwark Playhouse in London, October 12–31, 2010.

LaBute's first produced play, Filthy Talk for Troubled Times (1989), which was a series of biting exchanges between two "everyman" characters in a bar, was staged from June 3–5, 2010, by MCC Theater as a benefit for MCC's Playwrights' Coalition and their commitment to developing new work. He also directed the reading. Originally when it premiered in Manhattan, New York at the Westside Dance Project, "[legend] has it... that one unimpressed member of the audience shouted: "Kill the playwright!""

The Break of Noon premiered Off-Broadway at the Lucille Lortel Theatre in an MCC Theater production on October 28, 2010 (previews), running to December 22, 2010. The play then opened in 2011 in Los Angeles at the Geffen Theater for a second time directed by Jo Bonney, with a January 25 preview and opening on February 2. It ran through March 6. It featured Tracee Chimo, David Duchovny, John Earl Jelks, and Amanda Peet.

LaBute took part in London's Bush Theatre's 2011 project Sixty Six Books, for which he wrote a piece based upon a book of the Bible. In 2012, he joined the Chicago-based storefront theatre company, Profiles Theatre as a Resident Artist. The Way We Get By opened Off-Broadway at the Second Stage Theater on May 19, 2015, starring Amanda Seyfried and Thomas Sadoski with direction by Leigh Silverman.

The LaBute New Theater Festival is a festival of world premiere one-act plays which is produced by William Roth and St. Louis Actors' Studio each summer at their Gaslight Theater in St. Louis, Missouri and each winter at 59E59 street theaters in New York. In 2013, Some Girl(s) was directed by Daisy von Scherler Mayer, with the screenplay adapted by LaBute from his 2005 play. In an interview with Sam Weisberg of Screen Comment, he said: "I have had a lot of people direct my material for the theater, but I haven't had anyone do my work on film. I was excited by what would be brought to it. It was great to have someone else in there that you could trust visually and intellectually and emotionally to make something that was respectful of the material but also creative."

In August 2016, the Utah Shakespeare Festival in Cedar City produced a preview of LaBute's play How to Fight Loneliness and announced its intention to stage the play during its 2017 summer season. In February 2018, MCC Theater terminated its relationship with him ending his place as their playwright-in-residence and their plans to produce his next play Reasons to Be Pretty Happy in the summer. Blake West, MCC Theater's executive director, said, “We’re committed to creating and maintaining a respectful and professional work environment for everyone we work with.” In September 2018, it was announced that Netflix had given order for the production of the science fiction miniseries The I-Land. LaBute is credited as the showrunner and executive producer of the miniseries. The miniseries premiered on September 12, 2019.

== Critical response ==
Critics have responded to his plays saying they have a misanthropic tone. Rob Weinert-Kendt in The Village Voice referred to LaBute as "American theater's reigning misanthrope". The New York Times said that critics labeled him a misanthrope upon the release of his film Your Friends & Neighbors because of the film's strong misanthropic plot and characters. Britain's Independent newspaper in May 2008 dubbed him "America's misanthrope par excellence". Citing the misanthropic tone of the plot in the films In the Company of Men, Your Friends & Neighbors, and The Shape of Things, film critic Daniel Kimmel identified a pattern running through LaBute's work of being that the unlikeable, main antagonists of those three films end up getting away with their lying, scheming and mis-deeds, coming out on top of all the other characters as the real winners at the end of those stories by quoting: "Neil LaBute is a misanthrope who assumes that only callous and evil people, who use and abuse others, can survive in this world." Critics labeled him a misogynist after the release of In the Company of Men.

== Personal life ==
Neil was married to Lisa Gore LaBute, with whom he has two children. He and actress Gia Crovatin married in 2016.

=== Honors ===
In 2013, LaBute was named one of the winners of the American Academy of Arts and Letters' Arts and Letters Awards in Literature. He became a Fellow of the International Association of Theatre Leaders (IATL) in 2023.

== Filmography ==
=== Films ===
Year	Title	Director	Writer	Notes
1997	In the Company of Men	Yes	Yes	Also based on his play
1998	Your Friends & Neighbors	Yes	Yes	
2000	Nurse Betty	Yes	No	
2002	Possession	Yes	Yes	
2003	The Shape of Things	Yes	Yes	Also producer and based on his play
2006	The Wicker Man	Yes	Yes	Nominated for Golden Raspberry Award for Worst Screenplay
2008	Lakeview Terrace	Yes	No	
2010	Death at a Funeral	Yes	No	
2013	Some Girl(s)	No	Yes	Also based on his play
2013	Some Velvet Morning	Yes	Yes	
2015	Dirty Weekend	Yes	Yes	
2022	House of Darkness	Yes	Yes	Also producer
2022	Out of the Blue	Yes	Yes	
2023	Fear the Night	Yes	Yes	

=== Short films ===
Year	Title	Director	Writer	Producer	Notes
2000	Tumble	Yes	Yes	No	Also narrator
2010	How Far Would You Go?	Yes	No	No	Documentary promotional short film for the videogame Heavy Rain; Also appearance as himself
2010	Sexting	Yes	Yes	No	Released in the compilation Stars in Shorts (2012)
2010	We Have Your Wife	Yes	Yes	No	Released in the compilation Tenant (2021) Available on Amazon Prime.
2011	Bench Seat	No	Yes	No	
2011	After School Special	No	Yes	No	Released in the compilation Stars in Shorts (2012)
2012	Denise	No	Yes	No	
2012	Double or Nothing	No	Yes	No	
2012	BFF	Yes	Yes	No	
2014	It's Okay	No	Yes	No	
2016	The Mulberry Bush	Yes	Yes	Yes	
2017	10 K	Yes	Yes	Yes	
2017	Black Chicks	Yes	Yes	Yes	Also executive producer
2017	Good Luck: In Persian	No	Yes	Executive	
2019	Love is in the Air	No	Yes	No	Released on the anthology film Berlin, I Love You
2020	A Boat Time	Yes	Yes	No	Also actor
2020	Small World	Yes	Yes	No	Also actor
2022	Sparring Partner	No	Yes	Executive	

=== Television ===
Year	Title	Director	Writer	Executive Producer	Notes
2001	Bash: Latter-Day Plays	Yes	Yes	No	TV movie
2013-2015	Hell on Wheels	Yes	No	No	5 episodes
2013-2015	Full Circle	No	Yes	Co-executive	10 episodes
2014	ten x ten	Yes	Yes	No	Miniseries
2015-2016	Billy & Billie	Yes	Yes	Yes	11 episodes; Also creator
2016	Billions	Yes	No	No	Episode "The Good Life"
2016-2021	Van Helsing	No	Yes	Yes	Wrote 16 episodes
2017	Staging Film	No	Yes	Yes	Episode "Over the River and Through the Woods"
2019	The I-Land	Yes	Yes	Yes	Wrote 3 episodes and wrote/directed episode "Brave New World"

== Plays ==
- Filthy Talk For Troubled Times (1989)
- In the Company of Men (1992)
- Bash: Latter-Day Plays (1999)
- The Shape of Things (2001)
- The Distance From Here (2003)
- The Mercy Seat (2003)
- Autobahn (2003)
- Fat Pig (2004)
- This Is How It Goes (2005)
- Some Girl(s) (2005)
- Wrecks (2005)
- In a Dark Dark House (2007)
- Reasons to Be Pretty (2008)
- Helter Skelter/Land of the Dead (2008)
- The Break of Noon (2009)
- The New Testament (2009)
- Some White Chick (2009)
- The Furies (2009)
- Strange Fruit (2011)
- In a Forest, Dark and Deep (2011)
- Lovely Head & Other Plays (2013)
- Reasons to Be Happy (2013)
- Old Boyfriend (2014)
- Money Shot (2014)
- Exhibit 'A': Short Plays and Monologues (2015)
- The Way We Get By (2015)
- All The Ways To Say I Love You (2016)
- How to Fight Loneliness (2017)
- True Love Will Find You in the End (2020)
- The Answer to Everything (2021)
- St. Louis (TBA)
