= The Schopenhauer Effect =

American drama film

- Directed by: Alexis Lloyd
- Screenplay by: Alexis Lloyd
- Based on: The Schopenhauer Cure by Irvin D. Yalom
- Produced by: Molly Conners; Ronald Guttman; Jack Lechner; Alexis Lloyd; Alex Spatt
- Starring: Ezra Barnes; Bernardo Cubria; Gabriela Kohen; Elisha Lawson; Teresa Avia Lim; Cara Ronzetti; Thomas Sadoski; Lucy Walters; Dr. Elliot Zeisel
- Cinematography: Luke Geissbühler
- Edited by: Alexis Lloyd & Xavier Loutreuil
- Production companies: Helix Pictures; Phiphen Pictures
- Distributed by: Abramorama
- Release dates: October 2025 (Naples); March 13, 2026 (United States)
- Running time: 119 minutes
- Country: United States
- Language: English

The Schopenhauer Effect (originally released as Group: The Schopenhauer Effect) is a 2025 American drama film written and directed by Alexis Lloyd. The film follows a therapy group which is disrupted by the arrival of a new member, played by Thomas Sadoski. The film premiered at the Naples International Film Festival in October 2025, where it won the Programmer's Choice Award. It was theatrically released in the United States on March 13, 2026, by Abramorama.

== Cast ==
- Ezra Barnes as Frank
- Bernardo Cubria as Manny
- Gabriela Kohen as Karina
- Elisha Lawson as Stuart
- Teresa Avia Lim as Rebecca
- Cara Ronzetti as Tilda
- Thomas Sadoski as Alexis
- Lucy Walters as Pam
- Dr. Elliot Zeisel as Dr. Ezra Hertzfeldt (“Doc”)

== Production ==
Director Alexis Lloyd optioned Irvin D. Yalom’s 2005 novel The Schopenhauer Cure, with the aim of adapting it into a television series. Doing research, he attended a conference of the American Group Psychotherapy Association, where he met longtime group therapist Dr. Elliot Zeisel. Zeisel suggested that Lloyd join one of his groups. As Amanda Hess wrote in The New York Times, "When Mr. Lloyd showed up for his first session, he told the group about his TV show idea, which was met with skepticism, hostility and envy. 'I just kept coming, and they sort of accepted and resented it,' he said." While in Zeisel's group, Lloyd conceived of an approach to the material in which actors would improvise all dialogue within the parameters of a scripted narrative; and would be led by a real group therapist, ideally Zeisel himself. "I wanted to have a real pro doing this as opposed to an actor playing a pro", Lloyd said in an interview. "You need training for this. It’' like being a professional musician. If you want to play free jazz. It's gonna be really horrible if you only have done three, three months or six months of playing the trumpet. You really need a lot of technique, craft, and intelligence to do what Dr. Zeisel does. (He improvised) in his own way." Further, the work would be filmed in uninterrupted 90-minute takes, the length of a group session.

The first iteration of what became known as Group premiered as a web series on YouTube in May 2020. In The Atlantic, journalist Amy Wallace wrote that "the group's mutual pursuit of understanding and empathy felt refreshing, even potent. Maybe if Group's participants could raise one another up, the rest of us could, too." A second season, shot on Zoom at the height of the COVID-19 pandemic, premiered on YouTube on December 22, 2020. Both seasons of the web series aired in 2021 on the streaming channel PBS All Arts.

The feature film The Schopenhauer Effect is a meta take on the birth of the web series, with actor Thomas Sadoski playing a character based on Lloyd, who joins the group in order to do research for a television series.

== Reception ==
The film became a New York Times Critics' Pick. "It's invigorating to watch these interactions, even if similar filmmaking methods have been used before", wrote Times critic Ben Kenigsberg. "The bombshell that Ezra drops in the second session gets at something genuine about the bonds that can form in a group like this. By that point, viewers might feel attached as well." In Psychology Today, Ira Israel wrote, "What gives the film its richness is the depth of all the characters, each of which arrives bearing contradictions and hypocrisies that cannot be conveniently resolved. These fellow humans are complex, self-aware, generous, wounded, and surprisingly brave. That complexity never feels manufactured; rather, it feels honest and fresh."
