= Justin Kirk =

American actor

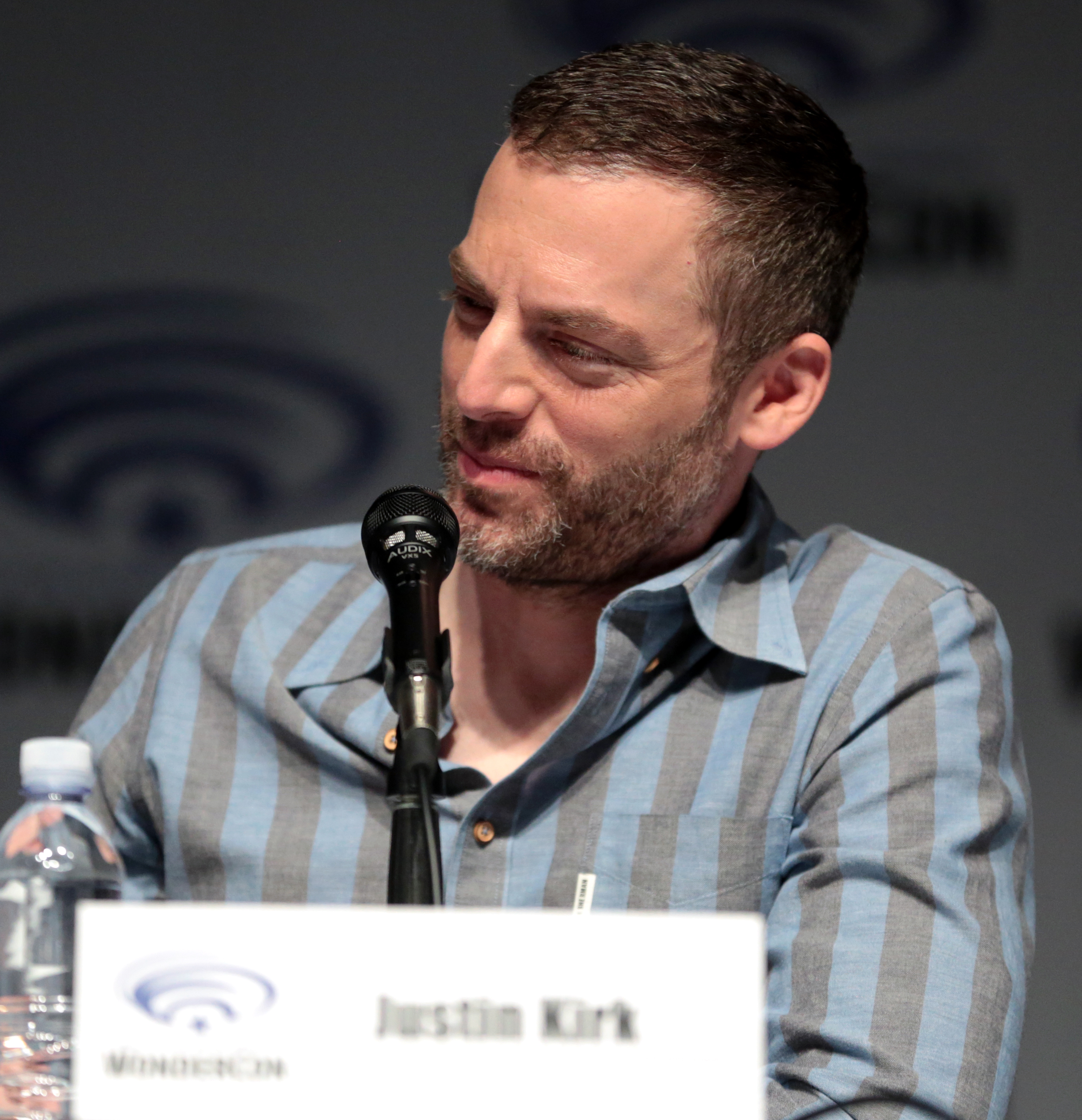
- Kirk at the 2017 WonderCon
- Born: May 28, 1969 (age 57); Salem, Oregon, U.S.
- Education: Circle in the Square Theatre School
- Occupation: Actor
- Years active: 1990–present

Justin Kirk (born May 28, 1969) is an American actor. He is best known for his roles as Prior Walter in the HBO miniseries Angels in America (2003), for which he received a nomination for the Primetime Emmy Award for Outstanding Supporting Actor in a Miniseries or a Movie, and Andy Botwin in the Showtime dark comedy series Weeds (2005–2012).

== Early life ==
Kirk was born in Salem, Oregon. His mother was of Russian-Jewish descent and his father was of Danish and English ancestry.

Kirk grew up in Union, Washington, where he attended a grade school on a Native American reservation, until his family moved to Minneapolis, Minnesota, when he was 13 years old. He attended high school there and performed at Children's Theatre Company.

Kirk moved to New York City after graduating. He played guitar in several New York bands in the early 1990s, most notably The Dimestore Darlings. He completed a two-year conservatory acting program at Circle in the Square Theatre School.

== Career ==
Kirk began his career on stage appearing off-Broadway in productions such as The Applicant, Shardston, Loose Ends, Thanksgiving, and Lovequest Live. He made his Broadway debut in Frank Gilroy's play Any Given Day which was performed at the Longacre Theatre. From 1994 to 1995, he played Bobby Brahms in Terrence McNally’s play Love! Valour! Compassion! on and off-Broadway. He next starred as Stephen Hoffman in Jon Marans’s two-character play Old Wicked Songs, staged at the New York's Promenade Theatre and Los Angeles' Geffen Playhouse. In 2012, he appeared in the role of Trip Wyeth succeeding Thomas Sadoski in Jon Robin Baitz’s play Other Desert Cities.

Kirk made his television debut in the short-lived CBS drama series New York News. From 1999 to 2001, he starred in The WB comedy drama series Jack & Jill. In 2003, he played Prior Walter in the HBO miniseries Angels in America, for which he received critical acclaim. He gained further recognition for his role as Andy Botwin in the Showtime dark comedy series Weeds. In 2012, he was cast as the lead in the NBC sitcom Animal Practice. The series was canceled after nine episodes, due to low ratings. In 2015, he appeared in the WGN period drama series Manhattan and FX/FXX comedy drama series You're the Worst. In 2018, he joined the cast of Showtime's Kidding. In 2020, he began playing the role of Hamilton Burger in HBO's Perry Mason. In 2021, he appeared in Succession as Congressman Jeryd Mencken.

Kirk‘s first appearance on screen was in the Mike Nichols' romantic horror film Wolf in a photograph as Laura Alden's deceased brother. He credited Ann Roth for the appearance. He made his feature film debut in the 1997 drama film Love! Valour! Compassion! recreating his stage role. His other film credits include Vamps (2012), Mr. Morgan's Last Love (2013), Justice League: War (2014), Ghostbusters (2016), Molly's Game (2017), The Tribes of Palos Verdes (2017), and Vice (2018).

== Acting credits ==
Key
†	Denotes projects that have not yet been released

=== Film ===
Year	Title	Role	Notes
1994	Wolf	Laura Alden's Brother	Appeared in a photograph, uncredited
1997	Love! Valour! Compassion!	Bobby Brahms	
1999	The Eden Myth	Aldo Speck	
1999	Chapter Zero	Lonnie	
2002	Teddy Bears' Picnic	Damien Pritzker	
2002	Outpatient	Morris Monk	
2006	Ask the Dust	Sammy	
2006	Hollywood Dreams	Robin Mack	
2006	Puccini for Beginners	Philip	
2006	Flannel Pajamas	Stuart Sawyer	
2007	Operation Homecoming: Writing the Wartime Experience	Narrator	
2008	Food Fight	Narrator	
2009	Against the Current	Jeff Kane	
2009	Four Boxes	Trevor Grainger	
2010	Elektra Luxx	Benjamin	
2010	See You in September	A.J.	
2010	The Presence	The Man	
2010	The Legend of Hallowdega	Justin Thyme	Short film
2011	L!fe Happens	Henri	
2012	Nobody Walks	Billy	
2012	Goats	Bennet	
2012	30 Beats	Adam	
2012	Vamps	Vadim	
2013	Mr. Morgan's Last Love	Miles Morgan	Also known as Last Love
2013	Chronicles Simpkins Will Cut Your Ass	Mr. Finkle	Short film
2014	Sexual Secrets	Aldo Speck	
2014	Justice League: War	Hal Jordan / Green Lantern (voice)	
2015	Walter	Gregory Tomlinson	
2016	Ghostbusters	Phil Hudson	Cut from the theatrical cut – only appears in the extended edition
2017	Molly's Game	Jay	
2017	The Tribes of Palos Verdes	Phil Mason	
2018	Vice	Scooter Libby	
2019	Jack and Jo Don't Want to Die	Jack Custodio	Short film
2020	Hollywood Fringe	Travis Sunstrom	
2021	Hangry	Leroy	Short film
2021	The Groke: A Tragedy in Two Acts	Mr. Emerson	Short film
2025	Émigré/Americana	Allan	Short film; also executive producer
2025	Miriam	Adam	Short film
TBA	The Take †	TBA	Post-production

=== Television ===
Year	Title	Role	Notes
1995	New York News	Bartender	Episode: "You Thought the Pope Was Something"
1998	The Pretender	Horace Strickland	Episode: "Hazards"
1998	Nothing Sacred	Jack	Episode: "A Nun's Story"
1999–2001	Jack & Jill	Bartholomew "Barto" Zane	32 episodes
2001	Law & Order: Special Victims Unit	Eric Plummer	Episode: "Wrath"
2003	Angels in America	Prior Walter / Leatherman in Park	Television miniseries
2005	CSI: Crime Scene Investigation	Patrick Bromley	Episode: "Spark of Life"
2005	Jack & Bobby	John McCallister	Episode: "Under the Influence"
2005–2012	Weeds	Andrew "Andy" Botwin	99 episodes
2005	Without a Trace	Thomas Beale	Episode: "Lost Time"
2006	Everwood	James Carmody	Episode: "Enjoy the Ride"
2009	Glenn Martin, DDS	Rick Montana (voice)	Episode: "A Bromantic Getaway"
2010–2015	Modern Family	Charlie Bingham	6 episodes
2012	Animal Practice	Dr. George Coleman	9 episodes
2013	Childrens Hospital	Michael	Episode: "Country Weekend"
2013	The Blacklist	Nathaniel Wolff	Episode: "General Ludd"
2014	Tyrant	John Tucker	10 episodes
2015	American Dad!	Ax Jenkins (voice)	Episode: "My Affair Lady"
2015	Wayward Pines	Peter McCall	2 episodes
2015	Manhattan	Joseph Bucher	2 episodes
2015	You're the Worst	Rob	2 episodes
2016	The Crossroads of History	Leonardo da Vinci	Episode: "Mona Lisa"
2017	APB	Gideon Reeves	12 episodes
2018–2020	Kidding	Peter Zeckhauser	18 episodes
2018	Overthinking with Kat & June	David	3 episodes
2019	Conversations in L.A.	Michael Miller	2 episodes
2020	Zoey's Extraordinary Playlist	Charlie Bennett	Episode: "Zoey's Extraordinary Boss"
2020–2023	Perry Mason	Hamilton Burger	11 episodes
2021–2023	Succession	Jeryd Mencken	5 episodes
2022	Roar	Larry the Duck (voice)	Episode: "The Woman Who Was Fed by a Duck"
2024–present	Interview with the Vampire	Raglan James	5 episodes
2025–present	Ghosts	Tad	5 episodes
2025	Talamasca: The Secret Order	Raglan James	Episode: "Wet Work"
2026	The 'Burbs	Gary Wilson	5 episodes
2026	Criminal Minds: Evolution	James Crowley / The Fan	4 episodes
2026	Get Jiro	Mysterious Officer / Alister Attenborough (voice)	3 episodes

=== Theatre ===
Year	Title	Role	Venue
1993	Any Given Day	Willis	Longacre Theatre
1994–1995	Love! Valour! Compassion!	Bobby Brahms	New York City Center
1995	Love! Valour! Compassion!	Bobby Brahms	Walter Kerr Theatre
1996	Old Wicked Songs	Stephen Hoffman	Promenade Theatre
1997	Old Wicked Songs	Stephen Hoffman	Geffen Playhouse
1998	June Moon	Fred Stevens (replacement)	Variety Arts Theatre
2001	Ten Unknowns	Judd Sturgess	Mitzi E. Newhouse Theater
2002	The World Over	Adam	The Duke on 42nd Street
2009	The Understudy	Harry	Laura Pels Theatre
2012	Other Desert Cities	Trip Wyeth (replacement)	Booth Theatre
2014	The Invisible Hand	Nick Bright	New York Theatre Workshop
2015	These Paper Bullets!	Ben	Gil Cates Theatre
2015–2016	These Paper Bullets!	Ben	Linda Gross Theatre

=== Podcasts ===
Year	Title	Role	Notes
2011–2014	Thrilling Adventure Hour	Ewing Klipsringer / Jason / Cupid	3 episodes
2021	Bronzeville	Eli Samson	4 episodes
2021	DUST	Charlie	Episode: "Beyond the Tattered Veil of the Stars"
2022	Marvel's Wastelanders: Black Widow	Hank Hammond	10 episodes

=== Music videos ===
Year	Song	Artist
2009	"Whatever You Like"	Anya Marina
2011	"How Blue"	Bleu

== Awards and nominations ==
Year	Award	Category	Work	Result	Ref.
2001	Lucille Lortel Awards	Outstanding Featured Actor	Ten Unknowns	Won	
2001	Drama Desk Awards	Outstanding Featured Actor in a Play	Ten Unknowns	Nominated	
2001	Outer Critics Circle Awards	Outstanding Featured Actor in a Play	Ten Unknowns	Nominated	
2004	Satellite Awards	Best Actor in a Supporting Role in a Series, Miniseries or Motion Picture Made for Television	Angels in America	Won	
2004	Screen Actors Guild Awards	Outstanding Performance by a Male Actor in Television Movie or Miniseries	Angels in America	Nominated	
2004	Primetime Emmy Awards	Outstanding Supporting Actor in a Miniseries or a Movie	Angels in America	Nominated	
2007	Golden Globe Awards	Best Performance by an Actor in a Supporting Role in a Series, Limited Series or Motion Picture Made for Television	Weeds	Nominated	
2007	Screen Actors Guild Awards	Outstanding Performance by an Ensemble in a Comedy Series	Weeds	Nominated	
2007	Golden Nymph Awards	Outstanding Actor – Comedy Series	Weeds	Nominated	
2007	Satellite Awards	Best Actor in a Supporting Role in a Series, Miniseries or Motion Picture Made for Television	Weeds	Nominated	
2008	Satellite Awards	Best Actor in a Series, Comedy or Musical	Weeds	Won	
2009	Screen Actors Guild Awards	Outstanding Performance by an Ensemble in a Comedy Series	Weeds	Nominated	
2016	Critics' Choice Awards	Best Guest Actor/Actress in a Drama Series	Manhattan	Nominated	
