= Full Circle (2013 TV series) =

American anthology television series (2013–2016)

- Genre: Drama; Anthology
- Created by: Neil LaBute
- Country of origin: United States
- Original language: English
- No. of seasons: 3
- No. of episodes: 30

Production
- Camera setup: Single-camera
- Running time: 30 minutes
- Production company: Momentum TV

Original release
- Network: Audience Network
- Release: October 9, 2013 – November 9, 2016

Full Circle (also known as Full Circle: Miami in its third season) is an American drama anthology television series that aired on the Audience Network from October 9, 2013, to November 9, 2016. The first season was ordered in April 2013. After airing a second season, the series was renewed for a political-themed third season in December 2015.

== Cast ==
=== Season 1 ===
- David Boreanaz as Jace Cooper
- Keke Palmer as Chan'dra Stevens
- Kate Walsh as Trisha Campbell
- Julian McMahon as Stanley Murphy
- Billy Campbell as Trent Campbell
- Cheyenne Jackson as Peter Barlow
- Noah Silver as Robbie Fontaine
- Ally Sheedy as Celeste Fontaine
- Tom Felton as Tim Abbott
- Minka Kelly as Bridgette Murphy
- Robin Weigert as Detective Karen Tanner
- Gia Crovatin as Sabrina

=== Season 2 ===
- Terry O'Quinn as Jimmy Parerra
- Stacy Keach as Bud O'Rourke
- Chris Bauer as Richie DeStefano
- Rita Wilson as Shelly Rezko
- Brittany Snow as Katie Parerra
- Patrick Fugit as Paulie Parerra
- David Koechner as Phil Davis
- Calista Flockhart as Ellen Kelly-O'Rourke
- Eric McCormack as Ken Waltham
- Kate Burton as Vera Quinn

=== Season 3 ===
- Christopher Gorham as Rick D'Andres
- Dougray Scott as Senator David Faulkner
- Graham Beckel as Fredrico Sturgis
- Harold Perrineau as Damon Houserman
- Laura San Giacomo as Elena Medina
- Kim Raver as Madeline Faulkner
- Raymond Cruz as Federico Sturgis
- Bob Stephenson as Sidney Waverly
- Mariana Klaveno as Angela Mancuso
- Max Arciniega as Alex Hidell
