= Playing with Fire (2019 TV series) =

American television series

- Spanish: Jugar con fuego
- Genre: Drama
- Based on: Amores Roubados by George Moura
- Screenplay by: Julia Montejo; Jose Luis Acosta
- Directed by: Mafer Suárez; Riccardo Gabrielli
- Starring: Jason Day; Margarita Rosa de Francisco; Carlos Ponce; Gaby Espino; Laura Perico; Alejandro Aguilar; Tony Plana
- Country of origin: United States
- Original language: Spanish
- No. of seasons: 1
- No. of episodes: 10

Production
- Executive producers: Peter Blacker; Miguel Varoni; Tony Plana; Diego Ramírez; Nancy Fernández; Ximena Cantuarias; Marcos Santana
- Camera setup: Multi-camera
- Production companies: Telemundo International Studios; Globo

Original release
- Network: Telemundo
- Release: 22 January – 4 February 2019

Playing with Fire (Spanish: Jugar con fuego) is an American television series produced by Telemundo International Studios and Globo for Telemundo. The story is based on the 2014 Brazilian miniseries Amores Roubados, written by George Moura. It aired from 22 January 2019 to 4 February 2019

A total of 10 episodes were confirmed for the limited series. The cast was announced on 10 December 2018.

== Plot ==
Fabrizio enters the lives of three women: Camila, her close friend Martina, and Martina's daughter, Andrea. His arrival from Mexico disrupts the lives of the households in the Colombian coffee region.

== Cast ==
- Jason Day as Fabrizio
- Margarita Rosa de Francisco as Martina
- Carlos Ponce as Jorge Jaramillo
- Gaby Espino as Camila
- Laura Perico as Andrea Jaramillo
- Alejandro Aguilar (actor) as Gildardo
- Tony Plana as Peter
- Marcelo Serrado as Thiago
- Leticia Huijara as Dolores
- Germán Quintero as Don Andrés
- Luis Alberti as Poncho
- Ricardo Vesga as Eliseo
- Yuri Vargas as Maricarmen
- Alvaro Rodríguez as Hilario
- Juan David Restrepo as Comandante Sánchez

== Ratings ==
Viewership and ratings per season of Playing with Fire
Season	Timeslot (ET)	Episodes	First aired		Last aired		Avg. viewers (millions)
Season	Timeslot (ET)	Episodes	Date	Viewers (millions)	Date	Viewers (millions)	Avg. viewers (millions)
1	Mon–Fri 9:00 pm	10	22 January 2019	1.44	4 February 2019	1.24	1.26

== Episodes ==
No.	Title	Directed by	Written by	Original release date	US viewers (millions)
1	"Fabrizio juega con fuego"	Mafer Suárez & Riccardo Gabrielli	Julia Montejo & José Luis Acosta	22 January 2019	1.44
In the coffee region, Fabrizio loves danger and the forbidden adventures with Camila. They take advantage of every moment to unleash their passion, without caring that Peter, Camila's husband, discovers them.
2	"El terror de Camila"	Mafer Suárez & Riccardo Gabrielli	Julia Montejo & José Luis Acosta	23 January 2019	1.24
In the middle of a lonely road, Camila and Peter are intercepted by two armed men. One of the aggressors wants to abuse her, in the eyes of her husband. Fabrizio remembers the past.
3	"Fabrizio el insaciable"	Mafer Suárez & Riccardo Gabrielli	Julia Montejo & José Luis Acosta	24 January 2019	1.14
Fabrizio is aroused by danger and sets his eyes on a new conquest. Camila gets upset and tramples him with her car, to make it clear that he belongs to her. Martina has a new illusion.
4	"Fabrizio tienta al diablo"	Mafer Suárez & Riccardo Gabrielli	Julia Montejo & José Luis Acosta	28 January 2019	1.25
Fabrizio begins to have unknown feelings towards Andrea, after she rescues him from death. Giraldo sows Jorge doubts about his wife.
5	"Jorge sabe que lo traicionan"	Mafer Suárez & Riccardo Gabrielli	Julia Montejo & José Luis Acosta	29 January 2019	1.27
Gildardo puts more fuel on the fire, when he shows Jorge photos of his wife with her lover. He bursts with rage and makes a radical decision. Fabrizio and Andrea make plans.
6	"El plan macabro de Jorge"	Mafer Suárez & Riccardo Gabrielli	Julia Montejo & José Luis Acosta	30 January 2019	1.22
After discovering that Fabrizio got involved with his wife, Jorge wants revenge and a bloody plan to get rid of him, without anyone suspecting what seems imminent.
7	"Desatan la ira contra Fabrizio"	Mafer Suárez & Riccardo Gabrielli	Julia Montejo & José Luis Acosta	31 January 2019	1.23
It's time to settle accounts with his wife's lover. Jorge deceives Fabrizio to accompany him to the place where he plans to kill him.
8	"A la caza de Fabrizio"	Mafer Suárez & Riccardo Gabrielli	Julia Montejo & José Luis Acosta	1 February 2019	1.27
On the brink of death, Fabrizio escapes Jorge's clutches. Beaten and hit by a bullet, he hides in the jungle. Andrea gets a pregnancy test.
9	"Dolorosa realidad"	Mafer Suárez & Riccardo Gabrielli	Julia Montejo & José Luis Acosta	4 February 2019	1.24
10	"Tragedia en el Eje Cafetero"	Mafer Suárez & Riccardo Gabrielli	Julia Montejo & José Luis Acosta	4 February 2019	1.24
All secrets come to light and the acts of Fabrizio bring fatal consequences. Andrea has a reason for hope. Jorge ends badly. Peter gets a DNA test.
