= Four Boxes (film) =

- The man in the hood wreaks havoc in Four Boxes
- Directed by: Wyatt McDill; Megan Huber
- Written by: Wyatt McDill; Megan Huber
- Produced by: Wyatt McDill; Megan Huber
- Starring: Justin Kirk; Terryn Westbrook; Bain Boehlke; Sam Rosen
- Release date: 2009
- Running time: 85 minutes
- Country: United States
- Budget: $40,000

Four Boxes is a 2009 low-budget horror thriller starring Justin Kirk, Terryn Westbrook and Sam Rosen. The film was written, produced and directed by the husband-and-wife team Wyatt McDill and Megan Huber of Minneapolis. The 85-minute film, which cost $40,000 to produce, debuted at the 2009 South by Southwest film festival.

The film is about three people who run an online auction business disposing of the possessions of recently deceased people. They move into a house they have to clear out, and discover on the computer a bookmarked website. This newly discovered website plays four webcams that are hidden in the apartment of a hooded bombmaker who is unaware he is being watched.

== Cast ==
- Justin Kirk as Trevor Grainger
- Terryn Westbrook as Amber Croft
- Sam Rosen as Rob Rankrus
- Bain Boehlke as Neighbor
- David Tufford as Bill Zill
