= Bash: Latter-Day Plays =

Bash: Latterday Plays is a collection of three dark one-act plays written by Neil LaBute. Each play is an exploration of the complexities of evil in everyday life. Two of the works, "iphigenia in orem" and "medea redux" have direct Greek influence, specifically Iphigenia in Aulis and Medea by Euripides. In production, the three short mono-duet dramas are presented in varying orders and sometimes omitting one or two of the works. In publication, however, the plays are presented in the following order: "iphigenia in orem" followed by "a gaggle of saints" and concluding with "medea redux". The plays premiered at the Douglas Fairbanks Theater in New York City for a limited run on June 24, 1999, and featured performances by Ron Eldard, Calista Flockhart and Paul Rudd under Joe Mantello's direction. They were later shown on cable television. The director, as well as the set and sound designer of the New York production, transferred the show to London's fringe Almeida Theatre for a similarly limited run in February and March 2000 with a new cast of Mary McCormack, Matthew Lillard, and Zeljko Ivanek. The plays had a regional US debut at TheatreZone's Actors Workshop in Boston, directed by Danielle Fauteux Jacques. They were later produced in 2003 by Pittsburgh's barebones productions, directed by Jeffrey M. Cordell.

Bash: Latterday Plays later made its West End theatre premiere at the Trafalgar Studios 2 on January 10, 2007, directed by Tamara Harvey and starring Harry Lloyd, Juliet Rylance, David Sturzaker, and Jodie Whittaker. The play was revived once again at Trafalgar Studios 2 on May 13, 2014, directed by Jonathan O'Boyle and starring Philip Scott-Wallace, Dani Harrison, Tom Vallen, and Rebecca Hickey. This production transferred from the Old Red Lion Theatre and was the West End debut for all four actors.

The characters featured in each of these works come from different backgrounds of the Mormon religious tradition, a religion LaBute espoused before receiving religious discipline (disfellowshipment) due to the defamatory nature of this play. He has since left the church.

The entire work typically takes about 100 minutes total in performance. A special note on grammar and style in Bash: the title of the full work, as well as the titles of the three pieces that comprise the work, regularly appear in all lowercase letters. Occasionally, the word "latterday" will have a hyphen inserted between the second and third syllables. Early publicity for productions of the work followed suit. In the first printed editions of the play, the names of characters and the beginnings of sentences were also not capitalized. Often, the characters' lines are written in an attempt to capture the contractions and patterns of contemporary American speech, such as "'s true" instead of "it is true" or "it's true."

== "iphigenia in orem" ==
The eponymous Iphigenia of the play is a baby girl who is suffocated by her father while she is asleep in her parents' bed. The man, who unwittingly has become the victim of a practical joke by one of his workmates, sacrifices his daughter for a higher standard of living when he takes at face value his colleague's news that he is going to be dismissed.

The play is a monologue addressed to an unseen person in a Las Vegas hotel room where the man has stopped during a business trip some years after the baby's murder. It takes the form of a confession which is heavily interspersed with the murderer's rationalizations for his deed.

== "a gaggle of saints" ==
Two attractive college-age adults, John and Sue, alternately address the audience, never speaking to each other. They relate the superficial details of a fancy party which they attended together in New York City. During the course of the monologue, John describes leaving Sue and the rest of the girls sleeping in the hotel room and coming across two middle-aged gay lovers (whom they had previously encountered earlier in the evening) in Central Park with his friends. The boys proceed to follow one of the men into a public bathroom, where they savagely beat the man seemingly to death before one of John's friends, Tim, offers up a short eulogy to the man. John and his two friends then go back to the hotel to call the girls down for breakfast where John tells the audience that Tim notices he has a noticeable amount of blood on his shirt. In an effort to make up a story for Sue, John has Tim break his nose in order to play off the injury and blood to Sue as his own mistake walking along the edge of a fountain. At breakfast, John presents Sue with a ring that he had stolen from the man they attacked in the Central Park restroom. At the end of the play, John and Sue interact for the first and only time on stage embracing one another and posing for a picture together as the flash of a camera bulb is heard and seen before going fading to black.

== "medea redux" ==
A woman sits alone at an institutional table, chain-smoking. She describes a sexual relationship she had, at thirteen, with her junior high school arts and sciences teacher. Later, as she struggles, young, pregnant and alone, she idealizes and protects her former lover, refusing to judge him. Eventually, she takes her young child to meet his father, who is married and has no children. The woman then describes how she murdered her son, without giving the audience any clear motive for the act, but presumably because she knows that it will cause her former teacher pain even though it is clear from her descriptions that she also dearly loves her child.

== See also ==
- Blood atonement
- Homosexuality and the LDS Church
- Latter Day Saints in popular culture
- Mormonism and violence
