= Wrecks =

Play by Neil LaBute

Wrecks is a one-man play by Neil LaBute, that was commissioned and produced by the Everyman Palace Theatre in Cork, Ireland. The play was a part of the city's Capital of Culture programme in 2005.

== Productions ==
Wrecks premiered in the United States Off-Broadway at the Public Theater on October 10, 2006 (September 2006 in previews) and closed on November 19, 2006. Ed Harris starred in the Everyman Palace Theatre production and reprised his role as "Edward Carr" Off-Broadway, with direction by LaBute.

Wrecks was produced at the Geffen Playhouse, Audrey Skirball Kenis Theater in Westwood, Los Angeles in February and March 2010, with Ed Harris again playing the role of "Edward Carr".

== Concept ==
The plot centers around a man, Edward Carr, coming to terms with the death of his wife, and the dark secret that brought them together.

== Critical reception ==
Ben Brantley wrote in his review in The New York Times: "The whole raison d’être of this slender, prickly tease of a monologue, which opened last night at the Public Theater with an expert performance by Ed Harris, is a last-minute revelation meant to induce gasps of both shock and admiration for its having been built so neatly. Whether you gasp or merely sigh wearily will depend on your familiarity with, and fondness for, the prolific Mr. LaBute’s bleak moral vision of humankind."

== Awards and nominations ==
The Off-Broadway production received nominations: 2007 Lucille Lortel Award, Outstanding Solo Show; 2007 Outer Critics Circle Award, Outstanding Solo Performance (Ed Harris); and 2007 Drama Desk Award, Outstanding Solo Performance (Ed Harris).
