= Secret Story (Peruvian TV series) =

La casa de los secretos
- Presented by: Carla García; Jason Day
- No. of days: 58
- No. of housemates: 18
- Winner: Alvaro
- Runner-up: Valentín

Release
- Original network: Frecuencia Latina
- Original release: 20 September – 16 November 2012

La casa de los secretos (lit. The House of Secrets) is a Peruvian reality competition television show based on the French series Secret Story and part of the franchise of the same name.

Like the original French version, the show is not a direct adaptation of the Big Brother franchise's format, created by producer John de Mol Jr. in 1997, but has a similar concept while including his own game mechanics, and is also produced and owned by Big Brother's production company Endemol Shine Group/Banijay Entertainment. Hosted by Carla García and actor Jason Day, it started on September 20, 2012, on Frecuencia Latina. Nomination Day was set for Thursdays and Eviction was set for Mondays.

== Housemates ==
=== Alex ===
- Civil Status: Single
- Date of birth: 3 December 1988
- Zodiac Sign: Sagittarius
- Birthplace: Rocha, Uruguay
- Status: Evicted (Day 40)

=== Alvaro ===
- Civil Status: Single
- Date of birth: 7 June 1991
- Zodiac Sign: Gemini
- Birthplace: Miraflores, Lima, Peru
- Status: Winner (Day 58)

=== Assad ===
- Civil Status: Single
- Date of birth: 15 July 1989
- Zodiac Sign: Cancer
- Birthplace: Jesús María, Lima, Peru
- Status: Walked (Day 19)

=== Cecilia ===
- Civil Status: Single
- Date of birth: 28 December 1980
- Zodiac Sign: Capricorn
- Birthplace: Barranco, Lima, Peru
- Status: Evicted (Day 54)

=== César ===
- Civil Status: Single
- Date of birth: 6 October 1987
- Zodiac Sign: Libra
- Birthplace: Bellavista, Callao, Peru
- Status: Evicted (Day 47)

=== Edson ===
- Civil Status: Single
- Date of birth: 26 September 1987
- Zodiac Sign: Libra
- Birthplace: Lima, Peru
- Status: 3rd Place (Day 58)

=== Fiorella ===
- Civil Status: Single
- Date of birth: 13 May 1987
- Zodiac Sign: Taurus
- Birthplace: San Martín, Tarapoto, Peru
- Status: Evicted (Day 12)

=== Geraldine ===
- Civil Status: Single
- Date of birth: 20 April 1990
- Zodiac Sign: Pisces
- Birthplace: Lima, Peru
- Status: Evicted (Day 57)

=== Hilda ===
- Civil Status: Single
- Date of birth: 20 April 1986
- Zodiac Sign: Aries
- Birthplace: Lima, Peru
- Status: Evicted (Day 56)

=== Karina ===
- Civil Status: Divorced
- Date of birth: 30 December 1981
- Zodiac Sign: Capricorn
- Birthplace: Lima, Peru
- Status: Walked (Day 41)

=== Ket ===
- Civil Status: Single
- Date of birth: 25 March 1991
- Zodiac Sign: Aries
- Birthplace: Porto Alegre, Brazil
- Status: Evicted (Day 33)

=== Lissy ===
- Civil Status: Single
- Date of birth: 3 August 1985
- Zodiac Sign: Leo
- Birthplace: Lima, Peru
- Status: 4th Place (Day 58)

=== Michael ===
- Civil Status: Single
- Date of birth: 19 July 1991
- Zodiac Sign: Cancer
- Birthplace: Lima, Peru
- Status: 6th Place (Day 58)

=== Paco ===
- Civil Status: Married
- Date of birth: 20 October 1982
- Zodiac Sign: Libra
- Birthplace: Chiclayo, Peru
- Status: Evicted (Day 19)

=== Rodrigo ===
- Civil Status: Single
- Date of birth: 1 October 1991
- Zodiac Sign: Libra
- Birthplace: Lima, Peru
- Status: 5th Place (Day 58)

=== Sandra ===
- Civil Status: Single
- Date of birth: 21 October 1992
- Zodiac Sign: Libra
- Birthplace: Lima, Peru
- Status: Evicted (Day 55)

=== Tatiana ===
- Civil Status: Single
- Date of birth: 5 October 1991
- Zodiac Sign: Libra
- Birthplace: Moquegua, Peru
- Status: Evicted (Day 26)

=== Valentín ===
- Civil Status: Single
- Date of birth: 25 July 1984
- Zodiac Sign: Leo
- Birthplace: Arequipa, Peru
- Status: Runner-Up (Day 58)

== Houseguests ==
=== Susy ===
Susy Diaz is an actress and former Congresswoman of Republic of Peru. She entered in the House on Day 13 and left on Day 14.

=== Conejo ===
Miguel Rebosio is a former footballer. He entered in the House on Day 21 and left on Day 22.

=== Puchungo ===
Puchungo Yañez is a former footballer. He entered in the House on Day 21 and left on Day 22.

=== Tongo ===
Tongo is a singer of cumbia music. He entered in the House on Day 30 and left 2 hours later.

=== Jason ===
Jason Day is an actor. He entered in the House on Day 36 and left 1 hour later.

=== Hermanos Yaipen ===
Hermanos Yaipen or Yaipén Brothers are a group of cumbia music. They entered in the House on Day 51 and left 2 hours later.

=== Katty, Irina and Lisette ===
Katty Rojas, Irina Grandez and Lisette Silva are peruan ballerinas. They entered in the House on Day 51 and left on Day 53.

=== Carla ===
Carla García is the presenter of La Casa de los Secretos. She entered in the House on Day 59 and left 2 hours later.

== Secrets ==
There are 18 secrets in the House for this first season.

Secret	Person	Discovered by	Discovered in:
I live with ghosts	Paco	Not Discovered	Revealed on Day 19
I have been in jail	Alex	Revealed by Alex	Revealed on Day 33
I am a detective	Sandra	Not Discovered	Revealed on Day 55
I am virgin	Geraldine	Not Discovered	Revealed on Day 57
I have 3 children from three different partners	Cecilia	Karina	Day 26
I drank from a baby bottle until I was 12	Michael	Not Discovered	Revealed on Day 58
I have only one testicle	Assad	Not Discovered	Revealed on Day 19
I was kidnaped by my father and my mother has rescued me	Tatiana	Not Discovered	Revealed on Day 26
I used to be a Hare Krishna	Valentín	Not Discovered	Revealed on Day 58
I was a member of "barra brava" of a football club	Alvaro	Not Discovered	Revealed on Day 58
My mother is Japanese	Edson	Not Discovered	Revealed on Day 58
I survived a plane crash	Ket	Not Discovered	Revealed on Day 33
I have lost 36 kg	Rodrigo	Ket	Day 22
I used to have an aggressive boyfriend/girlfriend	Lissy	Not Discovered	Revealed on Day 58
I will inherit a paradise island	Fiorella	Not Discovered	Revealed on Day 12
I have an obsessive-compulsive disorder	César	Not Discovered	Revealed on Day 47
I spent a New Year evening with Paris Hilton	Karina	Not Discovered	Revealed on Day 41
I was offered 300 dollars for being a lady-in-waiting	Hilda	Not Discovered	Revealed on Day 56

== Nominations table ==
	Week 1	Week 2	Week 3	Week 4	Week 5	Week 6	Week 7	Week 8				
	Week 1	Week 2	Week 3	Week 4	Week 5	Week 6	Week 7	Day 55	Day 56	Day 57	Finale	
Alvaro	Valentín; César	Paco; Valentín	Valentín; Tatiana	César; Valentín	César; Cecilia	No; Nominations	Cecilia; Valentín	No; Nominations	No; Nominations	No; Nominations	Winner (Day 58)	
Valentín	Michael; Lissy	Paco; Cecilia	César; Cecilia	Karina; Alvaro	Edson; Geraldine	No; Nominations	Cecilia; Alvaro	No; Nominations	No; Nominations	No; Nominations	Runner-Up (Day 58)	
Edson	Ket; Paco	César; Paco	César; Tatiana	César; Hilda	César; Hilda	No; Nominations	Lissy; Cecilia	No; Nominations	No; Nominations	No; Nominations	Third place (Day 58)	
Lissy	Tatiana; Fiorella	Ket; Paco	Tatiana; Ket	Ket; César	Rodrigo; Geraldine	Nominated	Cecilia; Hilda	No; Nominations	No; Nominations	No; Nominations	Fourth place (Day 58)	
Rodrigo	Alvaro; Tatiana	Cecilia; César	Alvaro; Cecilia	Cecilia; Karina	Cecilia; Hilda	Nominated	Valentín; Alvaro	No; Nominations	No; Nominations	No; Nominations	Fifth place (Day 58)	
Michael	Paco; César	Ket; Paco	Tatiana; Ket	Ket; César	Rodrigo; Geraldine	Nominated	Hilda; Cecilia	No; Nominations	No; Nominations	No; Nominations	Sixth place (Day 58)	
Geraldine	Fiorella; Karina	Paco; Alex	Cecilia; Karina	Cecilia; Karina	Karina; Lissy	Nominated	Cecilia; Lissy	No; Nominations	No; Nominations	No; Nominations	Evicted (Day 57)	
Hilda	Assad; Sandra	Lissy; Sandra	Cecilia; Lissy	Cecilia; Alex	Rodrigo; Alvaro	Nominated	Lissy; Michael	No; Nominations	No; Nominations	Evicted (Day 56)		
Sandra	Fiorella; Tatiana	Paco; Ket	Ket; Tatiana	Geraldine; Ket	Geraldine; Rodrigo	Nominated	Cecilia; Hilda	No; Nominations	Evicted (Day 55)			
Cecilia	Tatiana; Assad	Ket; Paco	Valentín; Tatiana	César; Ket	Rodrigo; Alvaro	No; Nominations	Lissy; Valentín	Evicted (Day 54)				
César	Assad; Ket	Assad; Ket	Ket; Cecilia	Cecilia; Alex	Rodrigo; Karina	Nominated	Evicted (Day 47)					
Karina	Fiorella; Tatiana	Ket; Assad	Tatiana; Geraldine	César; Ket	Rodrigo; Geraldine	Walked (Day 41)						
Alex	Assad; Ket	Assad; Ket	Ket; Tatiana	César; Ket	Rodrigo; Geraldine	Evicted (Day 40)						
Ket	Lissy; Karina	Paco; Cecilia	Cecilia; César	Cecilia; Karina	Evicted (Day 33)							
Tatiana	Lissy; Karina	Cecilia; Paco	Cecilia; Lissy	Evicted (Day 26)								
Paco	Fiorella; Ket	Ket; Assad	Evicted (Day 19)									
Assad	César; Karina	César; Paco	Walked (Day 19)									
Fiorella	Karina; Geraldine	Evicted (Day 12)										
Notes	none				^{1}	^{2}	none	^{3}			none	
Up for eviction	Fiorella; Karina; Tatiana	Ket; Paco	Cecilia; Tatiana	César; Ket	Alex; Geraldine; Rodrigo	César; Geraldine; Hilda; Lissy; Michael; Rodrigo; Sandra	Cecilia; Lissy	Alvaro; Edson; Geraldine; Hilda; Lissy; Michael; Rodrigo; Sandra; Valentín	Alvaro; Edson; Geraldine; Hilda; Lissy; Michael; Rodrigo; Valentín	Alvaro; Edson; Geraldine; Lissy; Michael; Rodrigo; Valentín	Alvaro; Edson; Lissy; Michael; Rodrigo; Valentín	
Walked	none	Assad	none			Karina	none					
Evicted	Fiorella; 67.03% to evict	Paco; 50.82% to evict	Tatiana; 56.56% to evict	Ket; 70.68% to evict	Alex; Most votes to evict	César; 33.78% to evict	Cecilia; 73.51% to evict	Sandra; Fewest votes to save	Hilda; Fewest votes to save	Geraldine; Fewest votes to save	Michael; Fewest votes to win	Rodrigo; Fewest votes to win
Evicted	Fiorella; 67.03% to evict	Paco; 50.82% to evict	Tatiana; 56.56% to evict	Ket; 70.68% to evict	Alex; Most votes to evict	César; 33.78% to evict	Cecilia; 73.51% to evict	Sandra; Fewest votes to save	Hilda; Fewest votes to save	Geraldine; Fewest votes to save	Lissy; Fewest votes to win	Edson; Fewest votes to win
Evicted	Fiorella; 67.03% to evict	Paco; 50.82% to evict	Tatiana; 56.56% to evict	Ket; 70.68% to evict	Alex; Most votes to evict	César; 33.78% to evict	Cecilia; 73.51% to evict	Sandra; Fewest votes to save	Hilda; Fewest votes to save	Geraldine; Fewest votes to save	Valentín; Fewest votes to win	Alvaro; Most votes to win

Notes:

- ^Note 1: Alex revealed his secret. He is automatically nominated by Secret Story as punishment.
- ^Note 2: Cecilia, César, Geraldine, Hilda, Lissy, Michael, Rodrigo and Sandra combined the nominations. As punishment they are automatically nominated by Secret Story, exempt Cecilia because she didn't vote for the housemates combined.
- ^Note 3: The housemates were evicted each day until remained 6 finalists for the finale.

== Nomination totals received ==
	Week 1	Week 2	Week 3	Week 4	Week 5	Week 6	Week 7	Day 55	Day 56	Day 57	FINAL	Total
Alvaro	1	0	1	1	2	–	2	–	–	–	Winner	7
Valentín	1	1	2	1	0	–	3	–	–	–	Runner-Up	8
Edson	0	0	0	0	1	–	0	–	–	–	3rd place	1
Lissy	3	1	2	0	1	–	4	–	–	–	4th place	11
Rodrigo	0	0	0	0	8	–	0	–	–	–	5th place	8
Michael	1	0	0	0	0	–	1	–	–	–	6th place	2
Geraldine	1	0	1	1	6	–	0	–	–	–	Evicted	9
Hilda	0	0	0	1	2	–	3	–	–	Evicted		6
Sandra	1	1	0	0	0	–	0	–	Evicted			2
Cecilia	0	4	7	5	2	–	7	Evicted				25
César	3	3	3	7	2	–	Evicted					18
Karina	5	0	1	4	2	Walked						12
Alex	0	1	0	2	–	Evicted						3
Ket	4	8	5	6	Evicted							23
Tatiana	5	0	8	Evicted								13
Paco	2	11	Evicted									13
Assad	4	4	Walked									8
Fiorella	5	Evicted										5
