= The Mercy Seat (play) =

Play by Neil LaBute

Original theatrical poster for The Mercy Seat.

The Mercy Seat is a 2002 play by Neil LaBute that was among the first major theatrical responses to the September 11, 2001 attacks. Set on September 12, it concerns Ben, a man who worked at the World Trade Center but was away from the office during the attack, with his mistress, Abby, who is also his boss. Expecting that his family believes that he was killed in the towers' collapse, Ben contemplates using the tragedy to run away and start a new life with his lover.

== Inspiration ==
Though urban legends of a similar adulterous situation circulated at the time, LaBute has said he was actually inspired to write the play when, after the events of September 11, his flight from Chicago to New York City was cancelled and he had to take a 21-hour train ride. LaBute explained to The New York Times that he thought, "This is inconvenient....[and] I remember thinking, 'Ooh, that's not a very good thought to have.' I knew it wasn't right, but the thought had already come out."

== Productions ==
=== New York ===
The Mercy Seat premiered Off-Broadway at the Acorn Theatre in an MCC Theater production on December 18, 2002 and closed on January 15, 2003. Directed by LaBute, the cast starred Liev Schreiber and Sigourney Weaver.

It was both a commercial and critical success (it sold out for the length of its run).

The play, which "requires almost a nonstop output of high-octane emotion," was an emotionally draining experience for Weaver and Schreiber. Weaver (who had already appeared in the 9/11-themed play The Guys) admitted that "It takes its toll....It's hard to be that rough to each other, it's hard to be those characters, and it's hard to be that rough to the world situation....But I must say, as well as shocking, [the play] was funny. And necessary." Schreiber, who stepped in to play Ben after frequent LaBute collaborator Aaron Eckhart proved unavailable, was deeply affected by his character's flaws, saying, "Doing this part, I feel, well, shadier. Not that I'm doing anything shady. It's like trying to shake off an itch that's not really there."

=== London ===
The Mercy Seat was produced at the Almeida Theatre in November 2003, directed by Michael Attenborough, with Sinead Cusack and John Hannah.

=== Lima ===
The Mercy Seat was performed in Lima, Peru, during June 2008, in a Spanish translation entitled Misericordia, starring Mónica Sánchez and Gonzalo Molina.

=== Rio de Janeiro ===
The Mercy Seat was produced, in Portuguese translation by Gustavo Klein as Marco Zero, in a production directed by Ivan Sugahara, and with Letícia Isnard and Tárik Puggina enacting the roles, at the Caixa Cultural Theatre in November and December 2015.

== Critical response ==
The TheatreMania reviewer wrote: "...this 100-minute, intermissionless piece may not be the author's most soul-searing, it's the one in which the characters seem the most human.
