= Bain Boehlke =

American film and theater actor (1939–2026)

- Born: Bainbridge Boehlke; July 23, 1939; Warroad, Minnesota, U.S.
- Died: September 11, 2026 (aged 87); Minneapolis, Minnesota, U.S.
- Occupations: Actor; director

Bainbridge Boehlke (July 23, 1939 – September 11, 2026) was an American film and theater actor. In addition to his theatrical career, Boehlke is perhaps best known for such films as Fargo and Four Boxes.

Boehlke was instrumental in the formation of what would become the Children’s Theater Company. He was also the founder and former artistic director of the Jungle Theater in Minneapolis, Minnesota. He died from cancer in Minneapolis, on September 11, 2026, at the age of 87.

== Filmography ==
Year	Title	Role	Notes
1996	Fargo	Mr. Mohra	
2006	Four Boxes	Neighbor	
