= Some Velvet Morning (film) =

- Directed by: Neil LaBute
- Written by: Neil LaBute
- Produced by: Michael Corrente; Daryl Freimark; Tim Harms; Trent Othick; David Zander
- Starring: Stanley Tucci; Alice Eve
- Cinematography: Rogier Stoffers
- Edited by: Joel Plotch
- Distributed by: Tribeca Film
- Release dates: April 21, 2013 (Tribeca Film Festival); December 10, 2013 (United States)
- Running time: 82 minutes
- Country: United States
- Language: English
- Box office: $6,420

Some Velvet Morning is a 2013 American drama film directed by Neil LaBute and starring Alice Eve and Stanley Tucci.

== Plot summary ==
Set entirely inside a rowhouse located in Brooklyn, New York City, and taking place in real time featuring a cast of only two people: a middle-aged lawyer named Fred (Stanley Tucci) surprises his beautiful young mistress Velvet (Alice Eve) by arriving at her doorstep after four years, claiming to have finally left his wife. After she rejects his attempts to rekindle their romance, his persistence evolves into obsession. As tensions rise, a dark history between the former lovers comes into focus.

Initially Velvet tries to get Fred to leave by claiming that she has another appointment with Fred's son, Chris. During Fred and Velvet's discussions, Velvet reveals that she was, and is currently still, working as a high-priced escort whom Fred met on one of his many business trips. Their talk eventually leads to a string of arguments over their relationship. The fight leads to violence as Fred forces himself upon Velvet and rapes her before walking out.

The climactic twist comes when Fred returns and both he and Velvet break character by revealing how they enjoyed play acting the entire scene. It turns out that 'Fred' is just one of Velvet's regular clients and they meet regularly to act out Fred's different fantasies. Fred pays Velvet for her services as well as some extra money for overstaying the hour. When Velvet expresses her wish to play a role other than escort in their future encounters and suggests that maybe she can be a nurse, he says that he will play the patient. As he leaves, Velvet asks Fred to promise that he will call her to schedule their next appointment.

== Cast ==
- Stanley Tucci as Fred
- Alice Eve as Velvet

== Reception ==
The film received mixed reviews upon release, with Jason Di Rosso from ABC Australia saying that the audience was "treated with utter contempt by the director and his accomplices". Chuck Bowen of Slant Magazine wondered "why LaBute was ever taken seriously as a so-called dramatist of the gulf between the sexes" and called the film a "prolonged exercise in resentful gender stalemating", giving it half a star out of five.

Currently, the film holds a 54% on Rotten Tomatoes, from 37 reviews. The website's critics consensus reads, "Some Velvet Morning marks writer-director Neil LaBute's welcome return to the mode of challenging chamber piece, but this misanthropic two-hander is too slight to produce the same bite as the filmmakers' best works." Christy Lemire, writing for RogerEbert.com, felt it represented a "return to the kind of writing and filmmaking with which Neil LaBute made his name" and awarded it 3 stars out of 4.
