= 30 Beats =

2012 film by Alexis Lloyd

- Film poster
- Directed by: Alexis Lloyd
- Screenplay by: Alexis Lloyd
- Produced by: Molly Connors; Carl Ford; Alexis Lloyd
- Starring: Ingeborga Dapkunaite; Jason Day; Vahina Giocante; Paz de la Huerta; Justin Kirk; Ben Levin; Lee Pace; Condola Rashad; Thomas Sadoski; Jennifer Tilly
- Cinematography: Lisa Rinzler
- Edited by: Xavier Loutreuil
- Music by: C.C. Adcock
- Production company: Worldview Entertainment
- Distributed by: Roadside Attractions
- Release date: July 20, 2012
- Running time: 88 minutes
- Countries: United States; France
- Languages: English; French (some dialogue)

30 Beats is a 2012 romantic comedy-drama film written and directed by Alexis Lloyd. It stars Ingeborga Dapkunaite, Jason Day, Vahina Giocante, Paz de la Huerta, Justin Kirk, Ben Levin, Lee Pace, Condola Rashad, Thomas Sadoski, and Jennifer Tilly.

The film was produced by Worldview Entertainment and distributed by Roadside Attractions. It was released theatrically and on VOD on July 20, 2012.

== Plot ==
Set in New York City over three days, the film follows 10 characters whose interconnected sexual encounters lead from one to the next.

Julie, a young woman who is a virgin, meets her former anthropology professor, Adam, at a loft and asks him to take her virginity. Afterward, Adam visits a tarot reader named Erika for advice about his sexual insecurities and superstitions. She performs a ritual intended to "cleanse" him of his sexual needs.

Erika meets Diego, a much younger bicycle messenger with whom she has weekly trysts in a Harlem apartment. Diego confides that he is in love with another woman, and Erika advises him on how to court her.

Diego visits Laura, the woman he desires. She invites him in but says she cannot have sex because of a heart condition and shows him a large surgical scar on her chest. Diego encourages her to accept her body.

Laura later visits her chiropractor, Matt, and attempts to seduce him. He initially resists but eventually gives in. The next day, Matt visits Kim, a young French woman he is dating, who tells him about her active sex life with other men and women.

Kim works as a switchboard operator at an answering service, where a regular caller, Julian, asks to meet her for lunch. Uncertain about him, Kim sends her girlfriend to meet him at a café. After becoming jealous when the two get along, Kim reveals herself, and the three spend the night together.

Julian, a speechwriter, regularly visits a call girl named Alice, who practices bondage with him. Alice tells him she plans to leave sex work and open an art gallery. Despite Julian's attempts to change her mind, she leaves to spend time alone in her new studio.

Alice later visits a health spa, where she has a sexual encounter with a younger man named Shawn in the steam room. Shawn slips, hits his head, and is taken to the hospital with short-term memory loss, leaving him unable to remember their encounter. Alice accompanies him to assure him that it happened.

After leaving the hospital, Shawn meets his childhood friend Julie, bringing the story full circle. He suggests having sex, but Julie initially refuses because they are best friends. The following day, she changes her mind, believing Shawn is also a virgin. Although he tells her he is not, she does not believe him, and they have sex on a rooftop. In the final scene, Julie breaks the red bracelet she shared with Adam and holds hands with Shawn as he reads a book.

== Cast ==
- Ingeborga Dapkunaite as Alice
- Jason Day as Diego
- Vahina Giocante as Kim
- Paz de la Huerta as Laura
- Justin Kirk as Adam
- Ben Levin as Shawn
- Lee Pace as Matt
- Condola Rashad as Julie
- Thomas Sadoski as Julian
- Jennifer Tilly as Erika

== Reception ==
"Clearly aiming for high artistic ground, the film doesn't even satisfy on an arousal level, with the discreet nudity and endless yakking not exactly proving a turn-on," said The Hollywood Reporter of the film.
