= Terryn Westbrook =

American actress

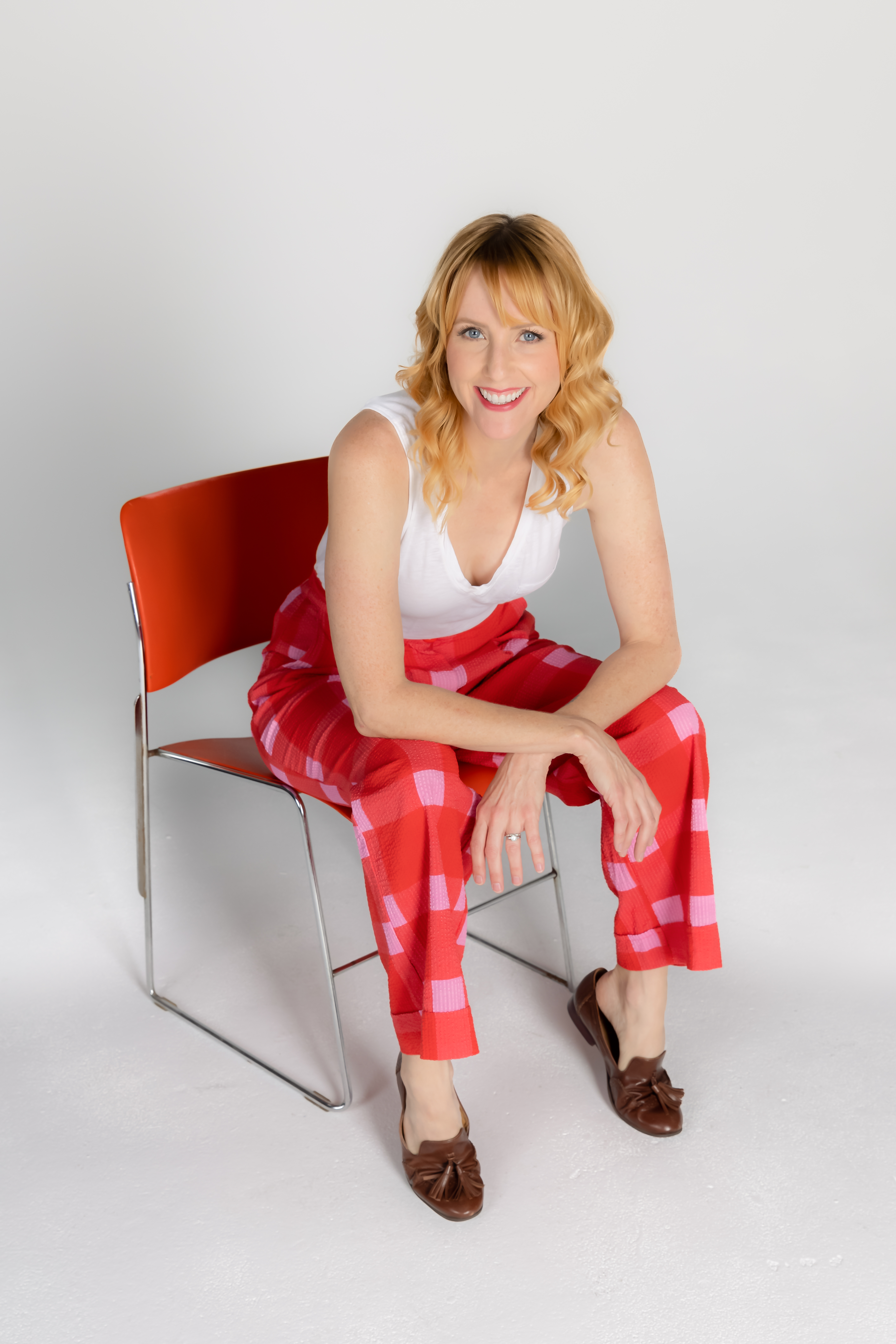
- Terryn Westbrook in 2021
- Born: United States
- Occupation: Actress
- Years active: 2003–present

Terryn Westbrook is an American actress who has appeared in television shows, movies and television commercials.

== Biography ==
Westbrook is perhaps known best for her supporting role as Chelsi in the 2006 David Lynch film Inland Empire and as Justin Hartley's nanny Natasha Morton on This Is Us. She also guest starred on the season 19 premiere of NCIS as County Deputy Regina Unger, appeared on season 2 of The Morning Show as Fay Ohoa and recurs as Margaret Brigham on season 3 of YOU.

Other notable television appearances include B Positive, Gilmore Girls, United States of Al, How I Met Your Mother, Weeds, Parks and Recreation, Jane the Virgin, 9-1-1, Dollface and AJ and the Queen.

Westbrook also appeared in indie films Congratulations, Hollywood Fringe, and the 2009 low-budget thriller Four Boxes.

Westbrook has appeared in dozens of commercials.

In 2013, Westbrook appeared in a Milk-Bone dog biscuit commercial.

In 2000, Westbrook appeared in a Counting Crows music video for “Mrs. Potter’s Lullaby”.

In 2019, Westbrook appeared in television film Bixler High Private Eye.
