= Reasons to Be Pretty =

Play written by Neil LaBute

- Faber & Faber cover
- Written by: Neil LaBute
- Original language: English
- Setting: The outlying suburbs. Not long ago.

Premiere
- Date premiered: 2008
- Place premiered: Lucille Lortel Theater, Greenwich Village, NY

Reasons to Be Pretty (stylized in all-lowercase) is a play by Neil LaBute, his first to be staged on Broadway. The plot centers on four young working class friends and lovers who become increasingly dissatisfied with their dead-end lives and each other. Following The Shape of Things and Fat Pig, it is the final installment of a trilogy that focuses on modern-day obsession with physical appearance.

== Productions ==
Produced by MCC Theater and directed by Terry Kinney, the play premiered at the off-Broadway Lucille Lortel Theater on June 2, 2008 and ran through July 5. The cast included Piper Perabo, Pablo Schreiber, Alison Pill, and Thomas Sadoski.

Ben Brantley of The New York Times thought the play "has an adolescent awkwardness at times that is the opposite of the contrived jigsaw-puzzle precision associated with Mr. LaBute... The relatively easygoing sprawl of reasons to be pretty allows his characters to talk naturally and at leisure as they ponder their own often less-than-pretty natures. In the course of these conversations, you realize anew what a sensitive ear Mr. LaBute has for the uncommonness in common speech — of the individuality within everyday language — and for how people of all levels of education and eloquence use words as instruments of power... What makes this play resonate is less its Big Theme — beauty (or lack thereof) and its discontents — than how that theme illuminates the insecurities of people who don't feel they have much to offer the world... reasons to be pretty is in part about learning to listen. If it stumbles in illustrating this lesson, it also opens its author's ears to a new, richly human music."

The Broadway production, also directed by Kinney, began previews at the Lyceum Theatre on March 13, 2009, opened on April 2, 2009 and closed on June 14, 2009 after 85 performances. The cast included off-Broadway cast members Thomas Sadoski and Piper Perabo joined by Marin Ireland and Steven Pasquale.

In reviewing the Broadway production for the New York Times, Brantley said, "Even more than when I saw it last June, reasons flows with the compelling naturalness of overheard conversation" and concluded, "It's never easy to say what you mean, or to know what you mean to begin with. With a delicacy that belies its crude vocabulary, reasons to be pretty celebrates the everyday heroism in the struggle to find out."

In 2011 it was produced in London at the Almeida Theatre with a cast including UK actress Billie Piper, Kieran Bew, Siân Brooke and Tom Burke. It opened to critical acclaim on the press night, November 17, 2011, with reviewers claiming it 'was one of the best theatre productions' they had seen in 2011.

The Australian premiere took place in May 2012 at the Darlinghurst Theatre in Sydney, directed by National Institute of Dramatic Arts graduate James Beach and starring Andrew Henry.

The first Canadian production was presented in Montreal, at Théâtre La Licorne, from November 19 to December 14, 2012 with Quebec French translation by David Laurin and direction by Frédéric Blanchette. The cast of l'obsession de la beauté included Anne-Élisabeth Bossé, Maude Giguère, David Laurin and Mathieu Quesnel.

Reasons to Be Pretty has also been put up in San Francisco at San Francisco Playhouse where it opened on March 26.

LaBute wrote a sequel to the play, Reasons to be Happy, which premiered in June 2013 at the Lucille Lortel Theatre in an MCC Theater production. It features the same four characters several years later, and starred Jenna Fischer, Josh Hamilton, Leslie Bibb and Fred Weller.

== Awards and nominations ==
=== Original Broadway production ===
| Year | Award ceremony | Category | Nominee | Result |
|---|---|---|---|---|
| 2009 | Tony Award | Best Play | Neil LaBute | Nominated |
| 2009 | Tony Award | Best Performance by a Leading Actor in a Play | Thomas Sadoski | Nominated |
| 2009 | Tony Award | Best Performance by a Featured Actress in a Play | Marin Ireland | Nominated |
| 2009 | Drama Desk Award | Outstanding Play | | Nominated |
| 2009 | Drama Desk Award | Outstanding Actor in a Play | Thomas Sadoski | Nominated |
| 2009 | Drama Desk Award | Outstanding Featured Actor in a Play | Pablo Schreiber | Won |
| 2009 | Drama Desk Award | Outstanding Director of a Play | Terry Kinney | Nominated |
| 2009 | Theatre World Award | Marin Ireland | | Won |
