= Old Wicked Songs =

Play written by Jon Marans

- Written by: Jon Marans
- Original language: English

Premiere
- Place premiered: Walnut Street Theatre

Old Wicked Songs is a two-character play written by Jon Marans. It was his first play, first performed in 1995, and received a nomination for the 1996 Pulitzer Prize in Drama.

== Productions ==
Old Wicked Songs was first produced at the Walnut Street Theatre, Philadelphia, opening on April 25, 1995. Directed by Frank Ferrante, the cast was Hal Robinson (Professor Josef Mashkan) and Roy Abramsohn (Stephen Hoffman).

The play premiered Off-Broadway at the Jewish Repertory Theatre Playhouse 91, presented by The Barrow Group, from October 28, 1995 to November 26, 1995. Directed by Seth Barrish, the cast was Hal Robinson (Professor Josef Mashkan) and Michael Stuhlbarg (Stephen Hoffman).

The play was presented Off-Broadway at the Promenade Theatre from August 16, 1996 to March 9, 1997. Directed by Seth Barrish, the cast consisted of Justin Kirk (Stephen Hoffman) and Hal Robinson (Professor Josef Mashkan).

The New Zealand premiere was at the Fortune Theatre in Dunedin from September to October 1998, and revived at the Court Theatre, Christchurch, from September to October 1999. The production was directed by Jon Waite, with Donald Hope Evans (Mashkan) and Michael Lee Porter as (Stephen).

The Apple Tree Theatre presented the play at the Metropolis Performing Arts Centre, in Arlington Heights, Illinois from October 18, 2000 to November 12. This is a revival of the Apple Tree Theatre production from February 1999, with Daniel J. Travanti and Tom Daugherty starring in both productions.

The play was produced in England at the Bristol Old Vic and was later moved to the Gielgud Theatre in the West End in 1996, directed by Elijah Moshinsky with Bob Hoskins and James Callis (Stephen). Between March 31 and May 10, 2008, it was produced at its venue city, in Vienna's English theatre in Austria.

== Characters ==
- Professor Josef Mashkan, Viennese, late-50s
- Stephen Hoffman, American, 25 years old

== Plot ==
Old Wicked Songs is about the relationship between a Viennese music professor in his late-50s named Professor Josef Mashkan and his newly acquired student Stephen Hoffman. Hoffman is a 25-year-old pianist who at one time was considered to be a prodigy in his field, but suffers from severe burn out and has not been performing for a year.

The play takes place in Vienna, Austria in Professor Mashkan's rehearsal studio. It begins in the spring of 1986 and continues through to summer. The national and international political background is Kurt Waldheim's election to Austrian federal president in the spring of 1986. Because of Waldheim's alleged involvement in war crimes in the Balkans during World War II his nomination was fervently opposed worldwide, e.g. by the World Jewish Congress. The protests, however, resulted in a stubborn reaction of the Austrian electorate and a clear Waldheim victory in a run-off election. During his presidency he was isolated internationally and put on the US Nazi watchlist.

Upon his arrival in Vienna, Hoffman is under the impression that he will be studying accompaniment under the instruction of Professor Schiller. However, much to his surprise, he must first study singing for three months under the tutelage of Professor Mashkan. At the very start of the play, Marans introduces Mashkan's racial slurs towards the Jewish race. It is later discovered that this is a defense mechanism used by Mashkan to cover up his dark secret.

Through his teachings, Mashkan tells Hoffman that there is both "sadness and joy" in music and that he should experience real life examples to better connect him to the message of composer Robert Schumann's song cycle Dichterliebe and the poetry of Heinrich Heine. Hoffman then tells Mashkan his plans to go to the opera to experience joy and to then visit the Dachau concentration camp for sadness.

After a series of lessons, Mashkan’s slandering of the Jewish culture begins to build a strong tension between him and Hoffman, who is Jewish. This is aggravated when Hoffman, fulfilling a promise given to his father, actually visits Dachau. After this experience, he skips Mashkan's lessons for over two weeks, wandering about in Vienna. When he returns, he tells Mashkan the whole story, including the night he spent with Sarah, a young Jew he met at the bus in Dachau. The recollection of this visit to the horrors of a concentration camp and the intense lovemaking afterwards again brings up the theme of "sadness and joy".

After an attempt at suicide, Mashkan is found lying on his couch by Hoffman. During the process of rescuing Mashkan, Hoffman notices a number tattooed on Mashkan's forearm, a clear sign that Mashkan is a Holocaust survivor.

== Background ==
Old Wicked Songs is Marans' earliest play.

Marans incorporates the poetry of Heinrich Heine and the music of Robert Schumann into this series of events. Through the translation sessions between Mashkan and Hoffman, Marans creates a link between two generations that find they have much more in common than they think.

Marans had previously studied Schumann's Dichterliebe in Vienna in 1978. Marans said: "I went there to learn singing because I wanted to be a lyricist. As a lyricist, I wanted to know how the singer felt." Schumann's song cycle is "infused with a 'young man's anger and passion.'" Marans stated, "Since I was 21 at the time and dealing with my own 'young man's rage', that's what I responded to."

== Awards ==
- 1996 Pulitzer Prize for Drama finalist
- Winner of the L.A. Drama Logue Award

== Adaptations ==
Old Wicked Songs is being developed as a film, with Avi Levy.

== Jon Marans ==
Jon Marans is an American playwright, librettist, lyricist, and editor. He graduated from Duke University with a degree in mathematics, with a minor in music. He is a recipient of a 2013 Guggenheim Fellowship.

Other works by Marans include A Strange and Separate People, Jumping for Joy, Legacy of the Dragonslayers, Opportunity Knocks, the musical Irrationals (music by Edward Thomas), The New Carol Burnett Show and The Temperamentals (2009). The Temperamentals is in film development with Daryl Roth Productions.
