= Thomas Sadoski =

American actor (born 1976)

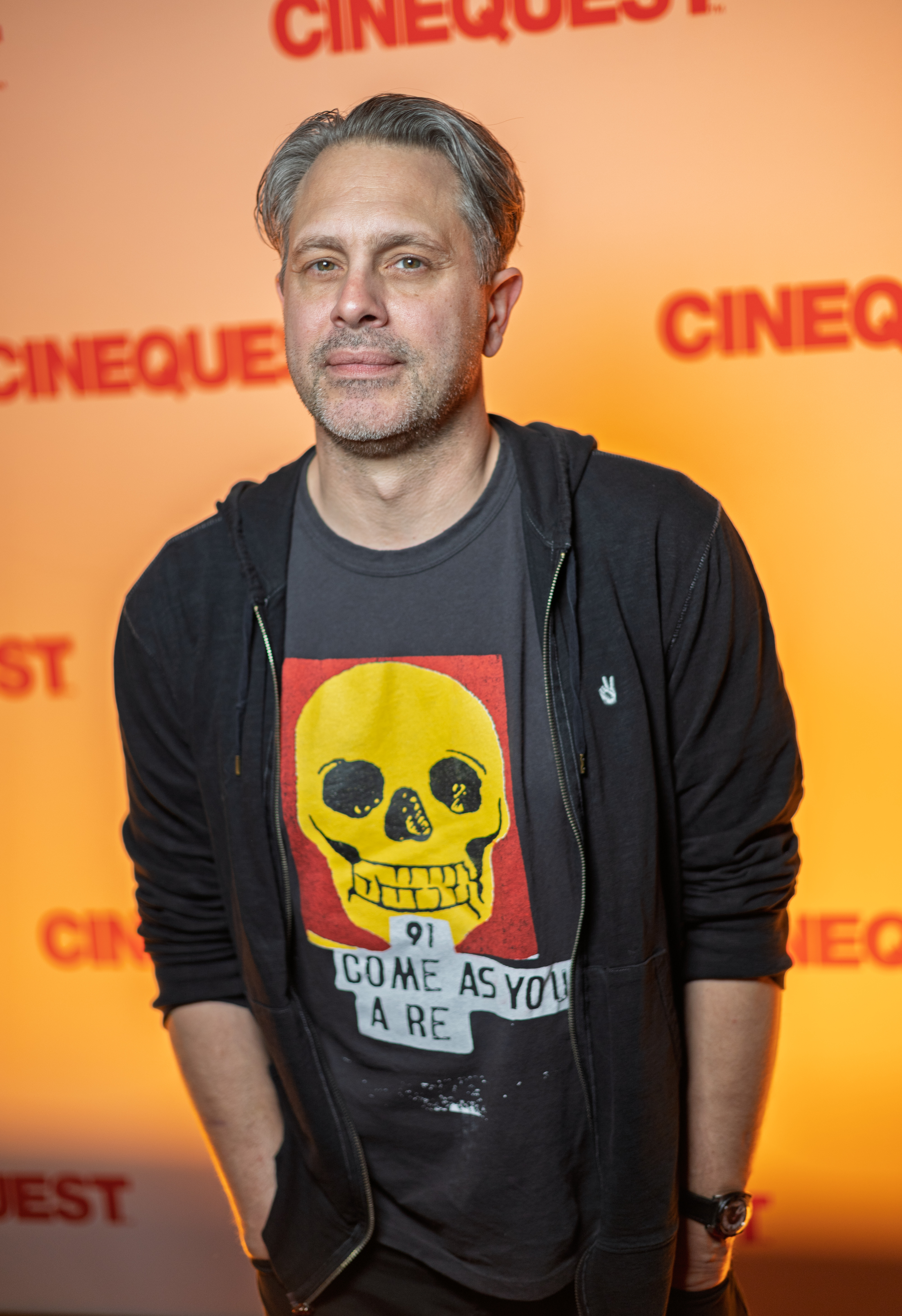
- Sadoski at the Cinequest Film Festival in 2026
- Born: Thomas Christian Sadoski; July 1, 1976 (age 50); New Haven, Connecticut, U.S.
- Education: Circle in the Square Theatre School
- Occupation: Actor
- Years active: 1998–present
- Spouses: Kimberly Hope (m. 2007; div. 2015) Amanda Seyfried (m. 2017; sep. 2026)
- Children: 2

Thomas Christian Sadoski (born July 1, 1976) is an American actor. He is best known for playing Don Keefer in the HBO series The Newsroom (2012–14) and Matt Short in the CBS sitcom Life in Pieces (2015–19).

== Early life and education ==
Sadoski was born in New Haven, Connecticut to Polish-American parents and raised in College Station, Texas. His father was a professor at Texas A&M University. Sadoski attended the University of North Texas for one semester before transferring to the Circle in the Square Theatre School. He graduated from Circle in 1998.

== Career ==
=== Theatre ===
Sadoski has appeared in several Broadway, Off-broadway, and regional theatre productions. He began his stage career in 1998 as Mark Ruffalo’s understudy in Kenneth Lonergan's This Is Our Youth at the Second Stage Theatre.

In 2004, Sadoski played husband to Mary-Louise Parker’s character in Craig Lucas’s Reckless on Broadway. In 2008, he played Greg in Neil LaBute's Off-Broadway production of reasons to be pretty at MCC Theater alongside future The Newsroom co-star Alison Pill. The show transferred to Broadway in April 2009. At the time, Sadoski was playing Andrew in Gina Gionfriddo's Becky Shaw and excused himself from the production to rehearse for reasons. For his performance in reasons, he was nominated for a Tony Award, Drama Desk Award, Outer Critics Circle Award, and Drama League Award. According to LaBute, Sadoski inspired the playwright to change the “original, darker ending” of reasons to be pretty to a “bittersweet” one. He said: "[Sadoski]’s own thoughtfulness and good heart helped me to not fall back on anything that I had done before. My plays usually end darkly. I always thought that was real life, that there were always shades of gray, but he helped me see some other colors in the palette."

In 2011, he played Trip Wyeth in Jon Robin Baitz's Other Desert Cities for which he won an Obie Award and Lucille Lortel Award. The play was transferred to Broadway in November 2011. In 2017, he appeared in the Broadway run of John Guare's The House of Blue Leaves alongside Ben Stiller, Edie Falco, Jennifer Jason Leigh and Alison Pill . In 2019, he was cast in Bess Wohl’s Grand Horizons alongside Michael Urie, Ashley Park, Maulik Pancholy and Priscilla Lopez. In October 2026, Sadoski portrayed Andy in the Broadway production of Downstate.

=== Film and television ===
Sadoski played executive producer Don Keefer in the HBO series The Newsroom from 2012 to 2014. Both Sadoski and Allison Pill were invited to audition for the show while they were working together in The House of Blue Leaves on Broadway. According to him, Don was a combination of two different characters from Aaron Sorkin’s original script.

In October 2014, Sadoski joined the cast of the NBC miniseries The Slap based on a 2008 novel by Christos Tsiolkas and a 2011 Australian series of the same name. He played Reese Witherspoon’s husband in the indie film Wild (2014) which was directed by Jean-Marc Vallée. He appeared as Officer Jimmy in the first two movies of the John Wick franchise—John Wick (2014) and John Wick: Chapter 2 (2017). In 2018, he joined the cast of the films Killing Eleanor and The Last Weekend In May.

Sadoski replaced David Fierro in Tommy (2020), playing a "charming, seductive, and morally complex” mayor of Los Angeles who appoints Edie Falco’s character as the city’s first female police chief. In 2022, he was seen in Devotion starring Jonathan Majors and Glen Powell. He appeared in the 2023 limited series The Crowded Room, which was directed and executive produced by Mona Fastvold and her husband Brady Corbet. In 2024, he was seen in the drama-anthology series American Sports Story and in the movie Lilly. Sadoski played Josh in Adult Children, which he also produced, in 2025. The film was directed by Rich Newey.

In March 2025, Sadoski joined the cast of Jill Takes a Break, a dramedy film directed by Liz Cardenas that he also produced. He will also appear in the upcoming Netflix drama series The Roman, executive produced by and starring Oscar Isaac.

== Personal life ==
After dating for eight years, Sadoski married studio casting executive Kimberly Hope in 2007. They divorced in October 2015.

Sadoski began dating actress Amanda Seyfried in early 2016. They confirmed their engagement on September 12, 2016 and got married on March 12, 2017. On March 24, 2017, it was announced that Seyfried had given birth to their daughter. In September 2020, Seyfried gave birth to their second child, a son. The couple announced their divorce on September 15, 2026.

=== Philanthropy and activism ===
Sadoski is a board member of the non-profit INARA. The organization helps displaced children get medical treatment they need, following injuries related to conflict. He is also an ambassador for the non-profit organizations War Child USA and War Child Canada, a member of the advisory board of the non-profit Fortify Rights and a board member emeritus of the non-profit Refugees International.

In 2024, Sadoski was presented an honorary doctorate for his humanitarian work by Niagara University.

== Theatre credits ==
Stage (partial)
Year	Play	Author	Role	Location	Notes
1998	This Is Our Youth	Kenneth Lonergan	Warren / Dennis understudy	McGinn-Cazale Theatre, New York, NY; Fairbanks Theatre, New York, NY	Professional debut
1999	Gemini	Albert Innaurato	Randy Hastings	Second Stage, New York, NY	
2000	The Hot l Baltimore	Lanford Wilson	Paul Granger III	Williamstown Theatre Festival, Williamstown, MA	
2000	The Skin of Our Teeth	Thornton Wilder	Henry Antrobus	Williamstown Theatre Festival, Williamstown, MA	
2001	Street Scene	Elmer Rice	Samuel Kaplan	Williamstown Theatre Festival, Williamstown, MA	
2001	The Waverly Gallery	Kenneth Lonergan	Daniel Reed	Long Wharf Theatre, New Haven, CT	
2002	Left	Richard Nelson	Eddie	Powerhouse Theatre, Poughkeepsie, NY	World Premiere
2002	The General From America	Richard Nelson	Matlack/ Pauling	Alley Theatre, Houston, TX; Lucille Lortel Theatre, New York, NY	
2003	Where We're Born	Lucy Thurber	Tony	Rattlestick Playwrights Theatre, New York, NY	World Premiere
2004	Reckless	Craig Lucas	Tom / Tom, Jr; Man in Ski Mask	Biltmore Theatre, New York, NY	Sadoski's Broadway debut
2004	Rodney's Wife	Richard Nelson	Ted	Williamstown Theatre Festival, Williamstown, MA	World Premiere
2005	Moonlight and Magnolias	Ron Hutchinson	David O. Selznick	Alliance Theatre, Atlanta, GA	
2006	Jump/Cut	Neena Beber	Paul	Julia Miles Theatre, New York, NY	World Premiere
2006	The Mistakes Madeline Made	Elizabeth Meriwether	Buddy	Bleecker Street Theatre, New York, NY	World Premiere
2006	All This Intimacy	Rajiv Joseph	Ty	McGinn-Cazale Theatre, New York, NY	World Premiere
2006/2007	The Santaland Diaries	David Sedaris	Crumpet	Long Wharf Theatre, New Haven, CT	
2007	Stay	Lucy Thurber	Billy	Rattlestick Playwrights Theatre, New York, NY	World Premiere
2007	Dissonance	Damian Lanigan	Hal	Williamstown Theatre Festival, Williamstown, MA	World Premiere
2007	The Joke	Sam Marks	Eddie	Studio Dante, New York, NY	World Premiere
2008	reasons to be pretty	Neil LaBute	Greg	Lucille Lortel Theatre, New York, NY	World Premiere
2008	Becky Shaw	Gina Gionfriddo	Andrew	Second Stage Theatre	New York Premiere
2009	reasons to be pretty	Neil LaBute	Greg	Lyceum Theatre, New York, NY	LaBute's Broadway debut
2010	The Bridge Project II: As You Like It, The Tempest	William Shakespeare	Touchstone, Stephano	BAM Harvey Lichtenstein Theater, Brooklyn, NY; Lyric Theatre, Hong Kong, HK; Esplanade Theatre, Singapore, SG; Théâtre Marigny, Paris, FR; Teatro Español, Madrid, ES; Ruhrfestspiele, Recklinghhausen, DE; Stadsschouwburg, Amsterdam, NL; The Old Vic, London, UK; Teatro Palacio Valdés, Avilès, ES	Directed by Sam Mendes
2011	Other Desert Cities	Jon Robin Baitz	Trip Wyeth	Mitzi E. Newhouse Theater, New York, NY	World Premiere
2011	The House of Blue Leaves	John Guare	Billy Einhorn	Walter Kerr Theatre, New York, NY	Broadway
2011	Other Desert Cities	Jon Robin Baitz	Trip Wyeth	Booth Theatre, New York, NY	Broadway
2012	Build	Michael Golamco	Kip	Geffen Playhouse, Los Angeles, CA	World Premiere
2015	The Way We Get By	Neil LaBute	Doug	Second Stage Theatre, New York, NY	World Premiere
2017	Moscow, Moscow, Moscow, Moscow, Moscow, Moscow	Halley Feiffer	Andrey	Williamstown Theater Festival; Williamstown, MA	World Premiere
2018	Belleville	Amy Herzog	Zack	Pasadena Playhouse; Pasadena, CA	
2019	White Noise	Suzan-Lori Parks	Ralph	Public Theater; New York, NY	World Premiere
2019	Grand Horizons	Bess Wohl	Ben	Williamstown Theatre Festival	World Premiere
2022	Wedding Band	Alice Childress	Herman	Theatre for a New Audience	NYC revival
2025	Downstate	Bruce Norris	Andy	Booth Theater, New York, NY	Broadway

== Filmography ==
=== Film ===
Year	Title	Role	Director	Notes
2000	Loser	Chris	Amy Heckerling	Film debut
2002	Winter Solstice	Chris Bender	Josh Sternfeld	
2003	Happy Hour	Scott	Mike Bencivenga	
2004	Company K	Corp. Richard Mundy	Robert Clem	
2008	The New Twenty	Feliz Canavan	Chris Mason Johnson	
2009	Split	Oliver	Jamie Buckner	Short film
2012	30 Beats	Julian	Alexis Lloyd	
2012	BFF	Jack	Neil LaBute	Short film
2013	The Dramatics	Gordon Bullard	Scott Rodgers	
2014	Take Care	Devon	Liz Tuccillo	
2014	It's Okay	Him	Tamar Levine	Short film
2014	Wild	Paul	Jean-Marc Vallée	
2014	John Wick	Officer Jimmy	Chad Stahelski	
2015	I Smile Back	Donny	Adam Salky	
2017	John Wick: Chapter 2	Officer Jimmy	Chad Stahelski	
2017	The Last Word	Robin Sands	Mark Pellington	
2017	The Games We Play	Paul	Annika Marks and Rich Newey	Short film
2018	Home Shopper	James Turner	Dev Patel	Short film
2018	Holy Moses	Sheriff	Eli Powers	Short film
2020	The Mimic	The Narrator	Thomas F. Mazziotti	
2020	Killing Eleanor	Greg	Rich Newey	
2022	Skin & Bone	Christian	Eli Powers	Short film
2022	88	Ira Goldstein	Eromose	
2022	Devotion	Dick Cevoli	J. D. Dillard	
2023	Stalking the Bogeyman	The Bogeyman	Markus Potter & Jack Dorfman	Short film
2024	Lilly	Jon Goldfarb	Rachel Feldman	
2025	Adult Children	Josh	Rich Newey	
2026	Group: The Schopenhauer Effect	Alexis	Alexis Lloyd	

=== Television ===
Year	Title	Role	Notes
2005	Law & Order	Robert Barnes	Episode: "Criminal Law"
2007	As the World Turns	Jesse Calhoun	8 episodes
2007	Law & Order: Criminal Intent	Patrick Cardell	Episode: "Lonelyville"
2009	Ugly Betty	Ryan the Caterer	Episode: "Dress for Success"
2009	Law & Order: Special Victims Unit	Joe Thagard	Episode: "Anchor"
2012–2014	The Newsroom	Don Keefer	Series regular, 25 episodes
2013–2014	Law & Order: Special Victims Unit	Nate Davis	2 episodes
2015	The Slap	Gary	8 episodes
2015–2019	Life in Pieces	Matt Short	Series regular, 79 episodes
2020	Tommy	Mayor Buddy Gray	Series regular, 12 episodes
2023	The Crowded Room	Matty Dunne	6 episodes
2024	American Sports Story	Brian Murphy	4 episodes

=== Producing ===
Year	Title	Role	Notes
2023	Dadiwonisi: We Will Speak	Executive Producer	
2024	Something Better Change	Producer	
2025	Adult Children	Producer	
2026	Group: The Shopenhauer Effect	Executive Producer	

== Audio ==
In January 2011, Sadoski narrated the audiobook for Stephen King's Mile 81. An AudioFile review said that Sadoski’s "matter-of-fact narration of the monster's deeds makes the tale that much more unnerving to hear". Publishers Weekly agreed saying: "Thomas Sadoski provides smooth, matter-of-fact narration that acts as a counterpoint to the chilling and unnerving story line".

Audio
Year	Project	Author	Notes
2012	Mile 81	Stephen King	Audiobook
2013	reasons to be pretty	Neil LaBute	Radio play, recorded for LA TheatreWorks
2015	The Children's Crusade	Ann Packer	Audiobook
2016	Zero K	Don DeLillo	Audiobook
2022	The Candy House	Jennifer Egan	Audiobook
2026	See You in Hell	Gary Whitta	Fiction podcast

== Awards and nominations ==
Year	Award	Category	Work	Result
2008	Lucille Lortel Award	Outstanding Featured Actor in a Play	Becky Shaw	Nominated
2009	Tony Awards	Best Actor in a Play	Reasons to Be Pretty	Nominated
2009	Drama Desk Award	Outstanding Actor in a Play	Reasons to Be Pretty	Nominated
2009	Drama League Award	Distinguished Performance	Reasons to Be Pretty	Nominated
2009	Outer Critics Circle Award	Outstanding Actor in a Play	Reasons to Be Pretty	Nominated
2011	Lucille Lortel Award	Outstanding Featured Actor in a Play	Other Desert Cities	Won
2011	Obie Awards	Distinguished Performance by an Actor	Other Desert Cities	Won
2018	Satisfied Eye International Film Festival	Best Supporting Actor	Holy Moses	Won
2025	Newport Beach Film Festival	Arts Champion Award	career achievement	Won
2025	Roundtop Film Festival	Lonestar Storyteller Award	career achievement	Won
