= Jason Day (actor) =

Peruvian actor

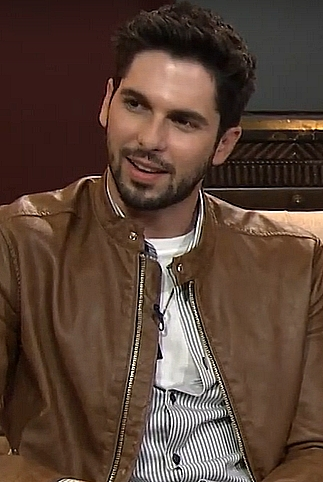
- Born: Jason Cuthbert Day del Solar; July 8, 1985 (age 41); Lima, Peru
- Occupation: Actor

Jason Day del Solar (born July 8, 1985) is a Peruvian actor. He has starred in a number of popular television series, including Playing with Fire (2019) and El Inmortal. Gangs of Madrid (2022-2024).

== Early life ==
Day was born in Lima in Peru. He studied acting in Los Angeles with Ron Burrus and Deborah Aquila. He also studied film direction at the Universidad del Cine in Buenos Aires in Argentina.

== Career ==
Day has starred in the TV series Esta sociedad (Season 1,2) and La Tayson, corazón rebelde, participated in the Fox series recorded in Bogotá and Miami El capo, broadcast by Mundo Fox and RCN, starred in the Latin American remake of the ABC hit series Revenge titled Venganza, Fox Latin America's science fiction series 2091 and in 2019 starred in Telemundo and O'Globo's production Jugar con Fuego, (Playing with Fire). He has starred in the films Mañana te cuento, Mancora, the American independent film 30 Beats, and Atacada, and directed the short film The Revelation. He co-hosted the reality show Secret Story in Peru, and starred in the critically acclaimed, unconventional theatre play Hoy Prometo No Mentir.

== Activism ==
Day is known for his human rights and political activism in his home country, Peru, where he has also been a weekly columnist for the newspaper La República.

== Filmography ==
TV
| Year | Title | Role | Notes |
|---|---|---|---|
| 2006 | Esta sociedad | Sebastian | Lead role |
| 2008 | Esta sociedad 2 | Sebastian | Lead role |
| 2011 | Lalola | Manuel Pereyra | Guest Star |
| 2012 | La Tayson, corazón rebelde | Rodrigo del Prado Sánchez-Concha | Lead role |
| 2012 | El capo | Agent Medina | Guest Star |
| 2016-2017 | 2091 | Lutar | Series regular |
| 2017 | Venganza | Daniel | Series regular |
| 2019 | Playing with Fire | Fabrizio Ramírez | Lead role |
| 2022-2024 | El Inmortal. Gangs of Madrid | Fausti | Series regular |
| 2025 | Alert: Missing Persons Unit | Goon #1 | Guest role |
| 2025 | Eva Lasting | Antonio Silva | Recurring role |
| 2025 | The Guest | Lorenzo | Series regular |
Films
| Year | Title | Role | Notes |
| 2004 | Mañana te cuento | Juan Diego | Co-Star |
| 2007 | La Gran Sangre: la película | Marcos | Supporting role. Film based on the series. |
| 2008 | Gods (Dioses) | Cano | Supporting |
| 2008 | Mancora | Santiago Pautrat | Co-Star |
| 2012 | 30 Beats | Diego | Co-Star |
| 2023 | How to Deal With a Heartbreak | | |
| TBA | Orquídeas del paraíso | Aquiles/Orquídea | Star |

== Theatre ==
- Laberinto de Monstruos
- Bodas de Sangre
- Los cachorros (2005)
- Espectazul (2006) as Él.
- Interrupciones en el Suministro Eléctrico (2007)
- Hoy Prometo No Mentir (2012) as Gordo.
