= Other Desert Cities =

Play by Jon Robin Baitz

- Playbill Cover for the Original Broadway Production of Other Desert Cities
- Original language: English
- Written by: Jon Robin Baitz
- Subject: Family secrets
- Genre: Drama
- Setting: Palm Springs, California

Premiere
- Date: January 13, 2011 (Off-Broadway); November 3, 2011 (Broadway) (Broadway Revival)October 18, 2026
- Place: Mitzi E. Newhouse Theater; New York City
- Official website

Other Desert Cities is a play by Jon Robin Baitz. The play premiered Off-Broadway in January 2011 and transferred to Broadway in November 2011, marking the Broadway debut of a Baitz play. The play was a finalist for the 2012 Pulitzer Prize for Drama. Other Desert Cities involves a family with differing political views and a long-held family secret.

== Plot ==
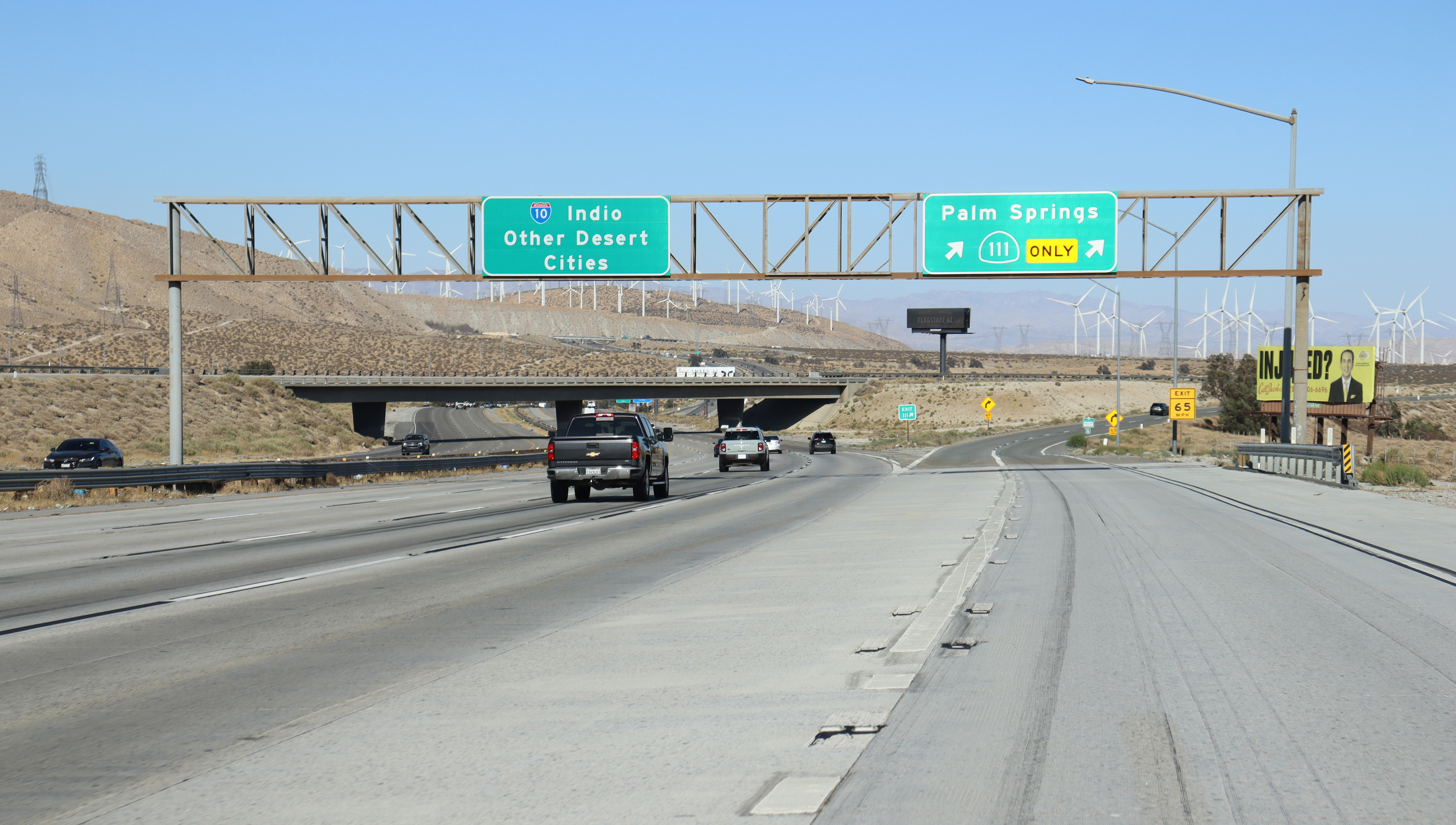
The namesake of the play's title is the "Other Desert Cities" freeway sign on eastbound Interstate 10 near the Coachella Valley

The play's name refers to a control city guide sign on eastbound Interstate 10 in California, which indicates that the freeway is headed towards Indio, California, and "Other Desert Cities" (that is, the rest of the Coachella Valley and onward towards Phoenix, Arizona).

The play's events occur around Christmas Eve 2004, when the family of Polly and Lyman Wyeth gather in Palm Springs, California. Their daughter Brooke Wyeth returns home after six years in New York writing magazine pieces. Polly's sister Silda is also visiting, out of a time spent in rehab. Polly and Lyman are Republicans, while Silda is a liberal who has fallen into alcoholism. The sisters co-wrote a series of MGM comedies in the 1960s, but have since become estranged chiefly due to Silda's resenting Polly for shifting social worldviews over time.

Brooke announces and presents to her family a memoir recounting a pivotal and tragic event in the family's history: the suicide of her late brother Henry, who had been involved with the radical underground subculture in Venice, and a horrific incident resulting from their advocacy.

During the course of the story, Brooke experiences bitter conflict between her yearning for independent understanding and reliance, and her parents' doting yet secretive motives towards her. During this, she also comes to terms with her family's sorrowing frustration in dealing with her post-divorce depressive episode, even years after Henry's disappearance. Nonetheless, after absorbing the family's perspectives, Brooke insists the memoir is vital for her continuing on in life, whether her family continues to embrace her or not.

In an act of submission from Lyman, he and Polly finally recount the specifics surrounding the recruitment center bombing Henry was implicated in, after years of personal clashes and rejection from both parents and son. Henry showed up disheveled, begging for help and insisting he was unaware of his friends' terrorism. When Lyman insisted Henry turn himself in nonetheless, another argument broke out and Lyman slapped him. Henry disappeared into the night, and wasn't found until three weeks later by Polly. She reveals that she made an interstate trip with Lyman and her son to the northern border, and the ferry he disappeared from. But Lyman painfully reveals they had also doctored Henry's suicide note themselves, and stuck it in his shoes with a tearful goodbye. With their darkest secret unearthed, Lyman and Polly come to terms with their grief, and give Brooke their consent for publishing.

Brooke, in the play's penultimate moment, launches all the pages of her memoir into the air in anguish, screaming of her internal suffering since Henry left her life, and trying to spare her parents the potential pain of her suicide despite her continual grief. Lyman embraces his daughter in remorse.

An epilogue reveals Brooke at her memoir's publishing, years after Polly and Lyman's passing, per their initial request. She recounts a memory of her brother, wondering when she will see him again.

== Characters and cast ==
Notable casts

Character	Original production	Broadway debut	Broadway revival
Character	2011	2011	2026
Polly Wyeth	Stockard Channing	Stockard Channing	Julia Louis-Dreyfus
Lyman Wyeth	Stacy Keach	Stacy Keach	Ed Harris
Silda Grauman	Linda Lavin	Judith Light	Allison Janney
Brooke Wyeth	Elizabeth Marvel	Rachel Griffiths	Lily Rabe
Trip Wyeth	Thomas Sadoski	Thomas Sadoski	Joe Keery

== Productions ==
The play was originally titled Love and Mercy. The play was first presented at a staged reading at the Ojai Playwrights Conference, California, in August 2010.

Other Desert Cities premiered Off-Broadway at the Mitzi E. Newhouse Theater at Lincoln Center Theater on January 13, 2011, in a limited engagement run, closing on February 27. The production starred Stockard Channing as Polly Wyeth, Linda Lavin as Silda Grauman, Stacy Keach as Lyman Wyeth, Thomas Sadoski as Trip Wyeth and Elizabeth Marvel as Brooke Wyeth. It was named Outstanding New Off-Broadway Play by the Outer Critics Circle.

The play transferred to Broadway at the Booth Theatre on November 3, 2011. Judith Light replaced Lavin and Rachel Griffiths replaced Marvel. Both the Off-Broadway and Broadway production were directed by Baitz's former romantic partner Joe Mantello. The production received five nominations at the 66th Tony Awards, including for Best Play, Best Actress in a Play (Stockard Channing), Best Featured Actress in a Play (Judith Light), Best Scenic Design (John Lee Beatty), and Best Lighting Design (Kenneth Posner). Judith Light won for Best Featured Actress in a Play.

Other Desert Cities was a finalist for the 2012 Pulitzer Prize for Drama.

=== 2026 Broadway revival ===
The play was revived on Broadway on October 18, 2026. The production, at the Hudson Theatre, was directed by John Benjamin Hickey and starred Julia Louis-Dreyfus, Ed Harris, Allison Janney, Lily Rabe, and Joe Keery.

=== Motion picture adaptation ===
In 2011, producers Walter Parkes and Laurie MacDonald acquired the film rights to Other Desert Cities. Baitz was to write the script and was set to co-produce, with Parkes and MacDonald producing; at the time, a studio was not named. No further word on a film adaptation has emerged since this initial announcement.

== Awards and nominations ==
=== 2011 Off-Broadway production ===
Year	Award	Category	Nominated work	Result	Ref.
2011	Outer Critics Circle Award	Outstanding New Off-Broadway Play	Jon Robin Baitz	Won	
2012	Pulitzer Prize for Drama		Jon Robin Baitz	Finalist	

=== 2011 Broadway production ===
Year	Award	Category	Nominated work	Result	Ref.
2012	Drama Desk Award	Outstanding Featured Actress in a Play	Judith Light	Won	
2012	Drama League Award	Distinguished Production of a Play		Won	
2012	Outer Critics Circle Award	Outstanding Featured Actress in a Play	Judith Light	Nominated	
2012	Tony Awards	Best Play	Jon Robin Baitz	Nominated	
2012	Tony Awards	Best Actress in a Play	Stockard Channing	Nominated	
2012	Tony Awards	Best Featured Actress in a Play	Judith Light	Won	
2012	Tony Awards	Best Scenic Design of a Play	John Lee Beatty	Nominated	
2012	Tony Awards	Best Lighting Design of a Play	Kenneth Posner	Nominated	

== Reception ==
Ben Brantley, in his review of the Broadway production for The New York Times, wrote that the play (Off-Broadway) was "...the most thoroughly integrated and sustained work from Mr. Baitz, who had been regarded as a promising wunderkind for long past his sell-by date." Brantley went on to write: "... directed with a masterly combination of shadow and shimmer by Joe Mantello, emerges as stronger, more sincere and more credible in its Broadway reincarnation. 'Cities' is now less of a showoff than it was, and its ensemble more of a piece. It has, in other words, settled comfortably into its own skin, which makes its characters’ discomfort all the more palpable."

The reviewer for The Hollywood Reporter (of the Broadway production) noted that "When it premiered in January, Jon Robin Baitz’s first new play in six years, 'Other Desert Cities', was smart and entertaining. But in its move to Broadway, this domestic dustup has ripened significantly. It has acquired a riveting center in the raw performance of Rachel Griffiths, who makes a knockout New York stage debut. With discreet adjustments to the text and more penetrating characterizations all around from the sterling cast, the balance between comedy and intense family drama has been fine-tuned in richly satisfying ways."
