= The Schopenhauer Cure =

2005 novel by Irvin D. Yalom

- First edition
- Author: Irvin D. Yalom
- Language: English
- Publisher: HarperCollins
- Publication date: 2005
- Publication place: United States

The Schopenhauer Cure is a 2005 novel by Irvin D. Yalom. The book centers around a psychiatrist with cancer and the change of dynamics in his therapy group, when he brings one of his former patients he believes he failed. The novel switches between the current events happening around the therapy group and the psychobiography of Arthur Schopenhauer.

== Plot ==
Dr. Julius Hertzfeld gets diagnosed with cancer, being given around a year left to live in. In a state of shock, he starts to think about patients he failed and one that comes to his mind is Philip Slate, a man with a sexual addiction. Julius calls Philip for an interview and realizes that Philip turned his life around, attributing his success to Arthur Schopenhauer after whom he has modeled his life. The doctor also finds out that Philip is on his way to becoming a psychotherapist. However, Julius thinks Philip isn't suited to become a psychotherapist, due to him noticing that Philip doesn't know how to empathize. Therefore, both men strike a deal: Philip has to come to Julius' therapy group for six months and if he stays, Julius will become his supervisor for his remaining hours.

Philip comes to Julius' therapy group, meeting Rebecca, Bonnie, Tony, Gill and Stuart, except Pam who's on a retreat in India. All of them get interested in the newcomer and are fascinated because he tends to quote philosophy, especially Schopenhauer. Philip's presence starts to change the other members of the group, but everything changes when Pam returns. It turns out Pam and Philip were involved in the past, but their liaison ended badly.

Just as the members start to change because of Philip, so does he start changing and becomes less like Schopenhauer and more like himself. In the penultimate meeting something happens that makes Julius feel that he has accomplished what he wanted with Philip and also makes plans with the group to celebrate the last meeting. However, Julius dies a few days later, never making it to the last meeting.

Three years later, Pam, Tony and Philip have become friends and are still meeting at the same café they used to meet at after their group therapy finished, but the other members have moved on with their lives. Afterwards, Philip and Tony arrive to their group therapy, Philip having become a therapist himself and Tony his co-therapist.

== Characters ==
Dr. Julius Hertzfeld – a psychiatrist who finds out he has cancer and decides to look for one patient he thinks he failed.

Philip Slate – a former sexual addict, who has modeled his life after Schopenhauer, and thinks life can be explained through philosophy.

Rebecca – a lawyer who is struggling with her beauty diminishing as she ages.

Tony – a college dropout with troubles with the law, who has feelings for Pam.

Pam – a university literature professor, who has had men troubles in her life, and also has a complicated past with Philip.

Bonnie – a librarian who has problems with her ex-husband and daughter.

Stuart – a pediatrician who hardly speaks in the group and memorizes everything that happens in the group.

Gill – a man who complains about his wife, but doesn't tell the group the reason why, but later does.

== Background ==
The story takes place around group therapies coordinated by Julius Hertzfeld and the influence and participation of a former patient, Philip Slate Schopenhauer. The book uses novelties in the world of psychiatry and psychology, with the addition of the philosophy of German 19th-century philosopher Arthur Schopenhauer, who claims that "to live is to suffer", inciting the self-knowledge of each individual. The reader is also presented with descriptions attempting to piece together the life of Arthur Schopenhauer:

Arthur's father, Heinrich, was tormented by his son's interests. The headmaster of Arthur's school had informed him that his son had a passion for philosophy, was exceptionally suited for the life of a scholar, and would do well to transfer to a gymnasium which would prepare him for the university. In his heart, Heinrich may have sensed the correctness of the schoolmaster's advice; his son's voracious consumption and comprehension of all works of philosophy, history, and literature in the extensive Schopenhauer library was readily apparent.

== See also ==
- When Nietzsche Wept
