= Calista Flockhart =

American actress (born 1964)

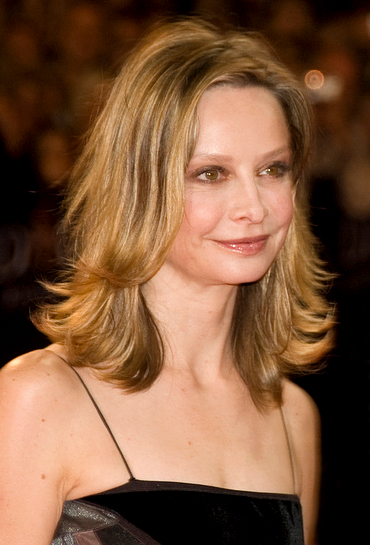
- Flockhart in 2009
- Born: Calista Kay Flockhart; November 11, 1964 (age 61); Freeport, Illinois, U.S.
- Education: Rutgers University, New Brunswick (BFA)
- Occupation: Actress
- Years active: 1989–present
- Known for: Ally McBeal; Brothers & Sisters; A Midsummer Night's Dream; Supergirl; The Birdcage
- Spouse: Harrison Ford (m. 2010)
- Children: 1

Calista Kay Flockhart (born November 11, 1964) is an American actress. She is best known for her role as the title character on the television series Ally McBeal (1997–2002), for which she received a Golden Globe Award in 1998 and was thrice nominated for the Primetime Emmy Award for Outstanding Lead Actress in a Comedy Series. She is also known for portraying Kitty Walker on Brothers & Sisters (2006–2011), Cat Grant on Supergirl (2015–2021), and as Lee Radziwill on Feud: Capote vs. The Swans (2024). In film, she is known for her performances in The Birdcage (1996), A Midsummer Night's Dream (1999), and Things You Can Tell Just by Looking at Her (2000).

== Early life and education ==
Flockhart was born in Freeport, Illinois, on November 11, 1964, the daughter of Kay Calista, an English teacher, and Ronald Flockhart, a Kraft Foods executive. Her parents retired to Morristown, Tennessee, where her father lived until his death and her mother continues to reside. She has one older brother, Gary. Her mother reversed her own first and middle names in naming her Calista Kay.

Flockhart attended Mason Gross School of the Arts at Rutgers University–New Brunswick. People began recognizing Flockhart's acting ability when Flockhart's acting teacher, William Esper, allowed Flockhart to perform on the main stage, making an exception to the practice normally restricting that venue to juniors and seniors, after Harold Scott insisted that she perform there in his production of William Inge's Picnic. Flockhart graduated with a Bachelor of Fine Arts in theater in 1988 from Rutgers as one of the few students who successfully completed the acting course. Rutgers inducted her into the Hall of Distinguished Alumni on May 3, 2003.

== Career ==
=== Early career ===
In spring 1989, Flockhart made her first television appearance in a minor role in an episode of Guiding Light as a babysitter. She also appeared in a half-hour afternoon special for Lifestories: Families in Crisis, playing a teenager battling an eating disorder. Flockhart made her professional debut on the New York stage, appearing in Beside Herself alongside Melissa Joan Hart, at the Circle Repertory Theatre. Two years later, Flockhart appeared in the television movie Darrow. Though she later appeared in films Naked in New York (1993) and Getting In (1994), her first substantial speaking part in a film was in Quiz Show, directed by Robert Redford.

Flockhart debuted on Broadway in 1994, as Laura in The Glass Menagerie. Flockhart received a Clarence Derwent Award for her performance. In 1995, Flockhart became acquainted with actors such as Dianne Wiest and Faye Dunaway when she appeared in the movie Drunks. In 1996, Flockhart appeared as the daughter of Dianne Wiest and Gene Hackman's characters in The Birdcage. Later that year, Flockhart starred in Jane Doe as a drug addict, though it was not released until 1999, over three years after filming ended. Throughout that year, she continued to work on Broadway, playing the role of Natasha in Anton Chekhov's Three Sisters.

=== Ally McBeal ===
In 1997, Flockhart was asked to audition for the starring role in David E. Kelley's Fox television series Ally McBeal. Kelley, having heard of Flockhart, wanted her to audition for the contract part. Though she hesitated due to the necessary commitment to the show in a negotiable contract, she was swayed by the script and traveled to Los Angeles to audition for the part, which she won. She earned a Golden Globe Award for Best Actress – Television Series Musical or Comedy for the role in 1998 and also nominated in 1999, 2000, 2001 and 2002. Flockhart also appeared on the June 29, 1998, cover of Time magazine, placed as the newest iteration in the evolution of feminism, relating to the ongoing debate about the role depicted by her character. Flockhart starred on the show until it was canceled in 2002.

=== Brothers & Sisters ===
Flockhart performed in a starring role as Kitty Walker, opposite Sally Field, Rachel Griffiths and Matthew Rhys, in the critically acclaimed ABC prime time series Brothers & Sisters, which premiered in September 2006 in the time slot after Desperate Housewives. The show was cancelled in May 2011 after running for five years. Flockhart's character was significant throughout the series' first four years, but her appearances were reduced for the 2010–2011 season, coinciding with the departure of TV husband Rob Lowe.

=== Other work ===
Flockhart played the role of Helena in A Midsummer Night's Dream, a 1999 film version of Shakespeare's play. In 2000, she appeared in Things You Can Tell Just by Looking at Her and Bash: Latter-Day Plays, later accompanying Eve Ensler to Kenya in order to protest violence against women, particularly female genital mutilation. Flockhart also starred in the off-Broadway production of Ensler's The Vagina Monologues.

In 2004, Flockhart appeared as Matthew Broderick's deranged girlfriend in The Last Shot. In the same year, Flockhart traveled to Spain for the filming of Fragile, which premiered in September 2005 at the Venice Film Festival. She was offered the role of Susan Mayer on Desperate Housewives but declined, and the role later went to Teri Hatcher.

In 2014, Flockhart appeared in Full Circle's second season, as mob boss Ellen. It aired in 2015. This was Flockhart's first acting role in three years, after her hiatus when Brothers & Sisters ended.

In 2015, Flockhart was cast in the television series Supergirl as Cat Grant, a "self-made media magnate and founder of CatCo" and boss to Kara (Supergirl's alter ego). The series premiered on October 26, 2015, on CBS. Due to the network's wish to reduce the show's budget, it was moved to sister network The CW after its first season, along with a move to filming in Vancouver. Flockhart remained with the show (albeit as a recurring character), despite her previous aversion to working outside Los Angeles.

In 2022, she played the role of Martha opposite Zachary Quinto in Edward Albee's Who's Afraid of Virginia Woolf? at the Geffen Playhouse in Los Angeles. The production was directed by Gordon Greenberg and also starred Aimee Carrero and Graham Phillips.

In 2024, Flockhart appeared as Lee Radziwill in Capote vs. The Swans, the second season of the anthology series Feud. Regarding playing Radziwill in an interview with The New York Times, Flockhart said, "Truman Capote recognized that she was living in her sister's shadow... and he would say things: 'You're so much prettier. You're so much smarter. You're more interesting. You have better style.' She really needed to hear that. I think it made her really love Truman. He was fun, and she confided in him, like they all did."

== Personal life ==
In January 2001, Flockhart announced that she had adopted a baby boy.

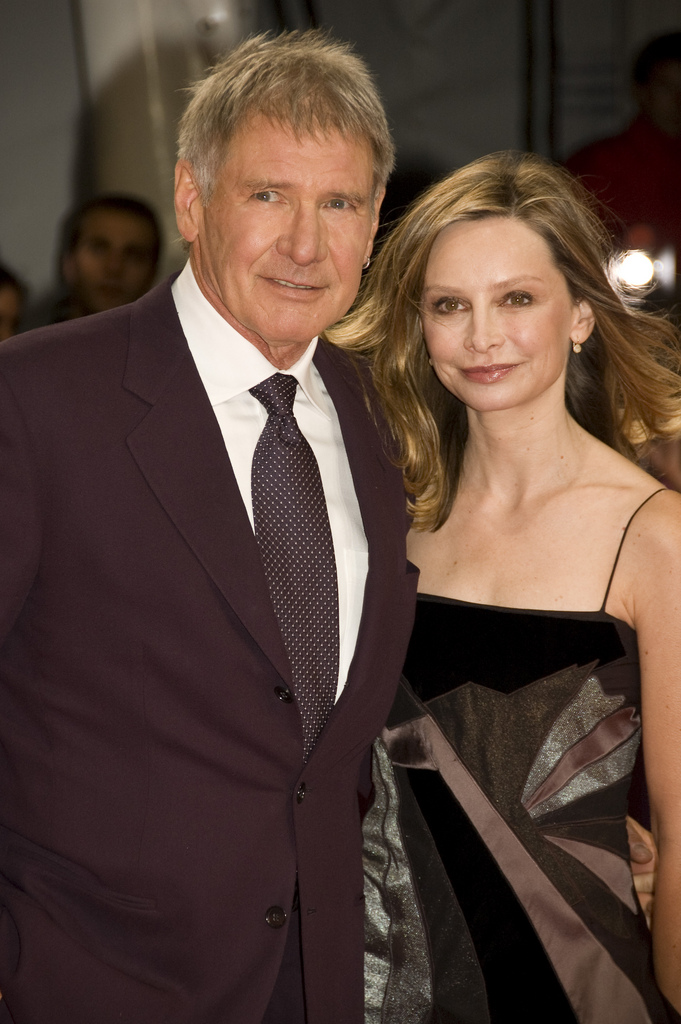
Flockhart and Harrison Ford in September 2009

Flockhart is married to actor Harrison Ford, whom she first met at the Golden Globe Awards on January 20, 2002. They became engaged on Valentine's Day in 2009, and were married on June 15, 2010, in Santa Fe, New Mexico. The ceremony was presided over by New Mexico Governor Bill Richardson and New Mexico Supreme Court Chief Justice Charles W. Daniels.

From 2004 to 2014, Flockhart served as the national spokeswoman for Peace Over Violence.

== Filmography ==
=== Film ===
Year	Title	Role
1993	Naked in New York	Acting student
1994	Clear Cut	
1994	Getting In	Amanda Morel
1994	Quiz Show	Barnard Girl
1995	Pictures of Baby Jane Doe	Jane
1995	Drunks	Helen
1996	The Birdcage	Barbara Keeley
1996	Milk & Money	Christine
1997	Telling Lies in America	Diney Majeski
1999	A Midsummer Night's Dream	Helena
2000	Things You Can Tell Just by Looking at Her	Christine Taylor
2004	The Last Shot	Valerie Weston
2005	Fragile	Amy Nicholls

=== Television ===
Year	Title	Role	Notes
1989	Guiding Light	Elise	
1991	Darrow	Lillian Anderson	Movie
1992	Lifestories: Families in Crisis	Mary-Margaret Carter	Episode: "The Secret Life of Mary Margaret: Portrait of a Bulimic"
1997–2002	Ally McBeal	Ally McBeal	Lead role (112 episodes)
1998	The Practice	Ally McBeal	Episode: "Axe Murderer"
1999–2000	Ally	Ally McBeal	Lead role (13 episodes)
2000	Happily Ever After: Fairy Tales for Every Child	Vanna Van (voice)	Episode: "Rip Van Winkle"
2000	Saturday Night Live	Herself (host)	Episode: "Calista Flockhart / Ricky Martin"
2001	Bash: Latter-Day Plays	Sue	Movie
2006–2011	Brothers & Sisters	Kitty Walker	Lead role (110 episodes)
2012	The Penguins of Madagascar	Doris (voice)	Episode: "The Penguin Who Loved Me"
2014	Robot Chicken	Dr. Ryan Stone / Smurfette / Rebecca Cunningham (voice)	Episode: "Batman Forever 21"
2014	Web Therapy	April Keating	Episodes: "Lost on the Young" and "Judicial Oversight"
2015	Full Circle	Ellen Kelly-O'Rourke	5 episodes
2015–2018, 2021	Supergirl	Cat Grant	Main role (season 1); Recurring (season 2; 4 episodes); Special guest star (seasons 3 & 6: 2 episodes)
2024	Feud: Capote vs. The Swans	Lee Radziwill	8 episodes
2024–2025	Invincible	April Howsam (voice)	4 episodes

=== Stage ===
Year	Title	Role	Notes
1994	The Glass Menagerie	Laura Wingfield	Criterion Center Stage Right, Broadway
1997	The Three Sisters	Natalya Ivanovna	Criterion Center Stage Right, Broadway
1999	Bash: Latter-Day Plays	woman	Douglas Fairbanks Theater, Broadway
2025	Curse of the Starving Class	Ella Tate	Pershing Square Signature Center, Off-Broadway

== Awards and nominations ==
Year	Award	Category	Work	Result
1998	Primetime Emmy Award	Outstanding Lead Actress in a Comedy Series	Ally McBeal	Nominated
1998	Golden Globe Award	Best Actress – Television Series Musical or Comedy	Ally McBeal	Won
1998	Screen Actors Guild Award	Outstanding Performance by a Female Actor in a Comedy Series	Ally McBeal	Nominated
1998	Screen Actors Guild Award	Outstanding Performance by an Ensemble in a Comedy Series	Ally McBeal	Nominated
1999	Primetime Emmy Award	Outstanding Lead Actress in a Comedy Series	Ally McBeal	Nominated
1999	Golden Globe Award	Best Actress – Television Series Musical or Comedy	Ally McBeal	Nominated
1999	Satellite Award	Best Actress – Television Series Musical or Comedy	Ally McBeal	Nominated
1999	Screen Actors Guild Award	Outstanding Performance by a Female Actor in a Comedy Series	Ally McBeal	Nominated
1999	Screen Actors Guild Award	Outstanding Performance by an Ensemble in a Comedy Series	Ally McBeal	Won
2000	Golden Globe Award	Best Actress – Television Series Musical or Comedy	Ally McBeal	Nominated
2000	People's Choice Awards	Favorite Female Television Performer	Ally McBeal	Won
2000	Satellite Award	Best Actress – Television Series Musical or Comedy	Ally McBeal	Nominated
2000	Screen Actors Guild Award	Outstanding Performance by a Female Actor in a Comedy Series	Ally McBeal	Nominated
2000	Screen Actors Guild Award	Outstanding Performance by an Ensemble in a Comedy Series	Ally McBeal	Nominated
2001	Primetime Emmy Award	Outstanding Lead Actress in a Comedy Series	Ally McBeal	Nominated
2001	Golden Globe Award	Best Actress – Television Series Musical or Comedy	Ally McBeal	Nominated
2001	Screen Actors Guild Award	Outstanding Performance by a Female Actor in a Comedy Series	Ally McBeal	Nominated
2001	Screen Actors Guild Award	Outstanding Performance by an Ensemble in a Comedy Series	Ally McBeal	Nominated
2002	Golden Globe Award	Best Actress – Television Series Musical or Comedy	Ally McBeal	Nominated
2016	Saturn Award	Best Supporting Actress On Television	Supergirl	Nominated

Awards and achievements
Theatre World Award
Preceded by Beverly D'Angelo for Simpatico	Theatre World Award; 1995 for The Glass Menagerie	Succeeded by Kevin Kilner for The Glass Menagerie
