= Ian Barford =

American stage and television actor

- Born: Bloomington, Indiana
- Occupations: Stage and television actor
- Years active: 1998–present
- Spouse: Anna D. Shapiro
- Children: 2

Ian Barford is an American stage and television actor. He has appeared on Broadway in August: Osage County and The Curious Incident of the Dog in the Night-Time. He was nominated for the Tony Award for Best Actor in a Play at the 74th Tony Awards for his performance in Linda Vista.

He has been a member of the Steppenwolf Theatre Company since 2007.

== Personal life ==
The Bloomington, Indiana-born Barford is married to Chicagoan Anna D. Shapiro; they have two children and live in Evanston, Illinois.

== Theatre ==
=== Steppenwolf Theatre ===
- The Rise and Fall of Little Voice (1994) as Billy
- As I Lay Dying (1995)
- Time of My Life (1995)
- The Libertine (1996)
- The Berlin Circle by Charles Mee (1998) as Mr. Market/Werner
- Three Days of Rain (1999) as Pip
- Lost Land (2005)
- Love Song by John Kolvenbach (2006) as Beane
- August: Osage County (2007) as Little Charles
- Up (2009) as Walter
- Endgame (2010) as Hamm
- Mary Page Marlowe (2016) as Ray
- The Minutes (2017) as Mr. Carp
- Linda Vista (2017) as Wheeler
- Amadeus (2025) as Antonio Salieri

=== Other theatre work ===
- Mad Forest (1994) – Remains Theatre
- The Rise and Fall of Little Voice (1994) as Billy – Broadway, May 1994
- Othello (1995) as Cassio – Shakespeare Repertory
- All the Rage and Design for Living (1998) – Goodman Theatre, Chicago
- The Weir (2001) as Brendan – Geffen Playhouse, Los Angeles
- God's Man in Texas (2002) as Hugo Taney – Los Angeles
- Take Me Out (2004) as Toddy Koovitz – Geffen Playhouse
- Dead End (2005) – Ahmanson Theatre, Los Angeles
- August: Osage County (2007) as Little Charles – Broadway, October 30, 2007, to June 15, 2008
- The Curious Incident of the Dog in the Night-Time (2014) as Ed / Ensemble – Broadway, September 10, 2014, to September 13, 2015
- Linda Vista (2019) as Wheeler – Broadway, September 19, 2019, to November 10, 2019 (Tony Award nomination)
- The Minutes (2020, 2022) as Mr. Carp – Broadway, February 25, 2020, to March 12, 2020, April 2, 2022, to July 10, 2022
- Betrayal (2025) as Robert – Goodman Theatre, February 8, 2025, to March 16, 2025

== Filmography ==
Source: TCM

- U.S. Marshals (1998)
- Tick-Tock (2000)
- Hellraiser: Inferno (2000)
- Road to Perdition (2002)
- 13 Going on 30 (2004)
- The Last Rites of Joe May (2011)
- Catch Hell (2014)
- Return to Sender (2015)

== Awards ==
Barford won the 1996 National Theatre Conference/Steppenwolf Theatre award.

Barford was nominated for Best Actor in a Play at the 74th Tony Awards for his performance in Linda Vista.
