= Fish in the Dark =

2015 Broadway play written by Larry David

- Original language: English
- Written by: Larry David
- Subject: Comedy
- Genre: Drama
- Setting: Los Angeles, California

Premiere
- Date: March 5, 2015
- Place: Broadway, Cort Theatre
- Directed by: Anna Shapiro
- Original run: 26 weeks

Fish in the Dark is a play by Larry David that focuses on fifteen characters as they deal with a death in the family. The play premiered on Broadway in 2015.

== History ==
Larry David got the idea for the play from his friend and lawyer Lloyd Braun. After Braun's father died, David went to visit him. Lloyd said "We’re sitting shiva, and Larry’s over the first day at my house, and I was telling him a whole bunch of stories of what had gone on for the last few days, because some were crazy and hilarious, like a relative flying in from wherever ’cause they want to be in show business. It’s an outlet for me. We start talking about how it’s incredible material. Larry says, 'It’s a Broadway play.'"

== Synopsis ==
The play opens in a hospital waiting room. Sidney Drexel, the family patriarch, is dying and assorted family members are coming to pay their last respects—and squabble over everything from which son will have to take care of Mom to who gets Dad's Rolex watch. Brothers Norman Drexel and Arthur Drexel are visiting their father in the hospital, along with Norman's wife Brenda and Arthur's girlfriend Michelle. Brenda is upset because she fears that her mother-in-law Gloria will live with them should the ill father die.

== Broadway production ==
Previews for the play started on February 2, 2015, at the Cort Theatre, with the official opening on March 5. Jason Alexander took over the role of Norman Drexel and Glenne Headly took over the role of Brenda Drexel on June 9, 2015. Direction was by Anna D. Shapiro with original music by David Yazbek.

The play was originally scheduled to end on July 7, then extended to July 19, 2015, and was extended again to August 1, 2015.

The play took in $13.5 million in advance sales at the box office, the highest advance for any spring production on Broadway and, according to The New York Times, beat the previous record for a play, $13.05 million for the 2013 revival of Harold Pinter's Betrayal.

=== Cast ===
- Norman Drexel was originally played by Larry David; Jason Alexander took the role on June 9, 2015.
- Brenda Drexel was originally played by Rita Wilson; Glenne Headly took over the role on June 9, 2015.
- Gloria Drexel played by Jayne Houdyshell
- Fabiana Melendez played by Rosie Perez
- Arthur Drexel played by Ben Shenkman
- Stewie Drexel played by Lewis J. Stadlen
- Diego Melendez played by Jake Cannavale
- Rose Canter played by Marylouise Burke
- Sidney Drexel played by Jerry Adler
- Michelle played by Jenn Lyon
- Greg played by Jonny Orsini
- Natalie Drexel played by Molly Ranson
- Nurse Ramirez played by Maria Elena Ramirez
- Jessica Drexel played by Rachel Resheff
- Doctor Meyers played by Joel Rooks
- Jay Leventhal played by Jeff Still
- Harry Kanter played by Kenneth Tigar
- Doctor Stiles played by Richard Topol

== Critical reception ==
The Broadway production received mixed reviews. The curtain.up reviewer noted "His first play, actually a direct descendant of his popular HBO sitcom 'Curb Your Enthusiasm', attracted twenty-two producers willing to mount it with a cast of eighteen at a time when even seasoned playwrights are asked to write for small casts. They also reached deep enough into their pockets to pay for three set changes, with one that even includes an elevator. And right those producers were. Fish in the Dark reeled in more than $14m in advance ticket sales. And the less than ecstatic initial reviews don't seem to have affected the demand for tickets. No matter that David has chosen to tie his stage debut to the retro sixties at a time when even Neil Simon's once all over Broadway comedies have lost their laugh-a-minute, ticket selling pull.... David's less original and nuanced play will keep the cash registers ringing as long as he's on stage to dish up the gags."
