= Lucky Stiff =

Musical by Lynn Ahrens and Stephen Flaherty, premiered in 1988

- Music: Stephen Flaherty
- Lyrics: Lynn Ahrens
- Book: Lynn Ahrens
- Basis: The Man Who Broke the Bank at Monte Carlo by Michael Butterworth
- Productions: 1988 Off-Broadway; 1997 West End

Lucky Stiff is a musical farce. It was the first collaboration for the team of Lynn Ahrens (book and lyrics) and Stephen Flaherty (music). The show is based on the 1983 novel The Man Who Broke the Bank at Monte Carlo by Michael Butterworth. It was created and performed at Playwrights Horizons off-Broadway in 1988, and won the Richard Rodgers Award for that year. The musical was seen in London's West End in 1997 but has not had a Broadway production. A film version had a limited release in theatres in 2015 but received mostly negative reviews.

== Productions ==
Lucky Stiff premiered off-Broadway at Playwrights Horizons in April 1988, playing for 15 performances. Directed by Thommie Walsh, the show starred Stephen Stout as Harry, Julie White as Annabel, Stuart Zagnit as Vinnie and Mary Testa as Rita.

The musical was produced at the Olney Theatre, Olney, Maryland, in May 1989, starring Evan Pappas as Harry. It won the 1990 Helen Hayes Award for Best Musical, and Pappas won as Best Actor in a Musical.

A 1994 studio cast recording included Pappas as Harry, Judy Blazer as Annabel, Testa as Rita, Jason Graae as Vinnie, Debbie Shapiro Gravitte as Dominique, Paul Kandel as Luigi and Patrick Quinn as the Monte Carlo Emcee/Ensemble.

In 1994, the musical had its British debut at the Theatre Royal in Lincoln in the English midlands, and in 1997 it had a West End production, directed by Steven Dexter and starring Frances Ruffelle, Paul Baker and Tracie Bennett. It was revived for five performances as part of York Theatre's Musicals in Mufti staged concert series in October 2003, starring Zagnit, Testa, and several of the other original Playwrights Horizons cast members, as well as Malcolm Gets as Harry and Janet Metz as Annabel.

== Synopsis ==
=== Prologue ===
Ten characters in a quasi–Greek chorus inform the audience of the zany plot twists to come. One of them, a man wearing dark glasses and silk pyjamas, is murdered ("Something Funny's Going On").

=== Act I ===
English shoe salesman Harry Witherspoon spends his Friday night taking inventory in a shoe shop, dreaming of a better life. Arriving at his shabby apartment, run by a mean-spirited landlady, he receives a telegram summoning him to a solicitor's office ("Mr. Witherspoon's Friday Night"). There, Harry learns that Anthony Hendon, an American uncle that he never met, has left him six million dollars. However, to receive the estate, Harry must take the corpse of his Uncle Anthony on an all-expenses paid "vacation" to Monte Carlo. Uncle Anthony's embalmed body is in a wheelchair and has been dressed to appear alive. Harry must fulfill the tasks specified by his uncle's will, or the money will go to his uncle's favorite charity, the Universal Dog Home of Brooklyn. Harry reluctantly accepts the terms of the will. He travels to Monte Carlo with the cassette tape that contains his instructions, a mysterious heart-shaped box, and his uncle's corpse in the wheelchair.

Meanwhile, in Atlantic City, optometrist Vinnie DiRuzzio is suddenly visited by his distressed, legally blind sister Rita LaPorta. She shows him a news article: "English shoe salesman has inherited six million dollars from his casino manager uncle." Rita tells Vinnie that due to her poor eyesight she accidentally shot her lover Tony. Tony was the manager of her husband Nicky's casino, and she had suspected that Tony was cheating on her. Rita explains that, with the help of Tony, she embezzled six million dollars' worth of diamonds from her husband. The heart-shaped box that contained the diamonds has disappeared. She also confesses that she has blamed this embezzlement on Vinnie, and so her husband Nicky has placed a contract on Vinnie's life. They fly to France to find Harry and retrieve the diamonds before Rita's husband kills Vinnie ("Rita's Confession").

On the train to Monte Carlo, Harry meets Luigi Gaudi, a flashy Italian, who offers to be his tour guide. Harry notices that a mysterious young woman is glaring at him and diligently taking notes ("Good to Be Alive"). He arrives in Monte Carlo with his uncle. Although frustrated that he must fulfill many painstakingly specific tasks to gain his inheritance, he ultimately reasons that he is "lucky" to be there ("Lucky"). When he sees the young woman from the train following him, he confronts her. Her name is Annabel Glick, a representative of the Universal Dog Home of Brooklyn, and she earnestly attempts to convince Harry to donate his uncle's money to the Dog Home. Harry hates dogs, due to his scarring experiences with his landlady's vicious dogs, and flatly refuses. Annabel notes that Harry must finish every task required by the will and that she is recording his every move to make sure that he executes flawlessly all of the conditions. Harry knows that if he makes one mistake, she will take charge of his uncle, finish the trip, and claim the estate. Harry vows to persevere ("Dogs vs. You").

Vinnie and Rita arrive in Nice, France. While Rita telephones hotels in Monte Carlo to find where Harry is staying, Vinnie telephones his wife. Vinnie informs her that he will not be home for dinner because he has been forced to travel to Monte Carlo to save his life; she angrily hangs up ("The Phone Call"). Rita finds Harry's hotel and books two rooms down the hall from his. Meanwhile, Harry and his uncle, doggedly pursued by Annabel, spend the day traveling around Monte Carlo doing what is required in the will, buying new clothes, gambling, visiting museums, skydiving, fishing and scuba diving ("A Day Around Town (Dance)").

That night Harry, Annabel and Luigi go to a glamorous nightclub where the glitzy Emcee declares Monte Carlo a place for "lovers in love". He mistakes Harry and Annabel for a couple on their honeymoon ("Monte Carlo!"). The Emcee then introduces the voluptuous singer and dancer Dominique du Monaco to the crowd. She sings a flamboyant cabaret number and has everybody in the nightclub bumping ("Speaking French"). After her performance Dominique speaks to Harry and tells him that his uncle has arranged for the two them to spend many hours together that night. Dominique sits next to Harry and teaches him a continental toast. Annabel, thoroughly out of her element in the nightclub, recalls the comfort that only a dog can bring ("Times Like This"). Dominique exits the nightclub with Harry; Annabel follows. The Emcee lauds the romantic merits of Monte Carlo ("Monte Carlo!" (reprise)).

While Harry is having fun in the casino, Rita, now disguised as a maid, searches Harry's hotel room for the diamonds. Vinnie is nervous and soon leaves. Harry returns to the hotel room with Uncle Anthony; Rita hides in the closet. Harry leaves the corpse in the room and returns to the casino to continue gambling, closely followed by Annabel. Rita, squinting from the closet, can barely make out the shape of the man in the wheelchair. She steps out to face who she believes to be her still-living lover, Tony. After begging his forgiveness and declaring her continued love for him, she kisses his cold hand and discovers that he is dead ("Fancy Meeting You Here"). Harry is on a winning streak at the casino due to Tony's friend's infallible system for winning at roulette. Rita, now livid, arrives at the casino armed with a gun and Tony's corpse. She threatens to kill Harry unless he hands over the diamonds ("Act I Finale: Good to Be Alive").

=== Interlude ===
The cast as a Greek chorus briefly reminds the audience of where they left off ("Something Funny's Going On" (reprise))

=== Act II ===
Annabel and Harry, with Uncle Anthony in tow, escape from Rita. In the ensuing fracas, Rita's gun accidentally goes off as her brother tries to restrain her. Rita turns the crowd on Vinnie and pursues Harry. Chaos ensues as Harry and Annabel try to hide from Rita and protect Uncle Anthony. A drunken maid mistakes Uncle Anthony for a pile of laundry and wheels him away. Annabel, Harry, Rita and Vinnie then frantically attempt to locate one another, the heart-shaped box, and the missing corpse. During Vinnie's search, he encounters the shapely Dominique du Monaco. She is most interested in his search for the diamonds ("Him, Them, It, Her").

Unable to locate Uncle Anthony, Annabel and Harry return to Harry's room. Several people attempt to earn a cash reward by bringing people in wheelchairs into the room. None is Uncle Anthony. Giving up the search, Harry and Annabel open a bottle of Anthony's Dom Perignon and let down their guard. Annabel makes a toast to Harry and herself, saying that it was "nice" suffering through the week with him. Their relationship mellows as they finish the bottle ("Nice").

That night in bed, Harry has a terrible nightmare. Everyone is half dog and half human ... his landlady maliciously welcomes him back to his depressing life as a shoe salesman ... Rita threatens him with a machine gun ... Luigi and Annabel taunt him for his failure to fulfill the terms of the will. Harry's dead uncle gets out of his wheelchair and tap dances while everyone else forms a ghastly kickline ("Welcome Back, Mr. Witherspoon"). Harry wakes up horrified to find Annabel in bed next to him. They are both shocked to find themselves together in a state of undress. Miraculously, the drunken maid enters the bedroom with Uncle Anthony. Harry and Annabel exchange a quick moment of joy before becoming embarrassed again. Annabel, now antagonistic towards Harry, goes to the bathroom to get dressed, and Harry mulls over the situation ("A Woman in My Bathroom").

As Annabel is about to leave, Rita bursts into the room, gun in hand. She is now wearing her glasses and realizes that the corpse is not her lover Tony, but a dead stranger; she then demands the heart-shaped box from Harry and Annabel. They refuse to give in to her demands. With nowhere to hide, Harry and Annabel huddle together in fear, expecting to be shot dead ("Nice" (reprise)). Luigi Gaudi enters the room and proclaims that he is the real Uncle Anthony. He explains that his best friend (the dead man in the chair and the real Luigi Gaudi) was murdered by Rita and that he sent Harry to Monte Carlo in order to give his dead friend one last chance to experience Monte Carlo, in accordance with Luigi's dying wishes ("Confession #2" (reprise)). Anthony reveals that the six million dollars in diamonds is actually sewn inside the corpse. The heart-shaped box contains only the heart of the dead Luigi.

Vinnie and Dominique du Monaco burst into the room dressed as maids. Brandishing a gun at everyone, Vinnie tells the group that he plans to start a new life in Europe with Dominique. He demands the diamonds. Rita gladly hands him the heart-shaped box; Vinnie and Dominique exit. Tony gives Annabel Luigi's life savings in the form of a $10,000 cheque made out to the Universal Dog Home of Brooklyn. Tony gives Harry $500 and reminds him that he still has the rest of the week in Monte Carlo; he says the week is prepaid and that Harry has Luigi's infallible roulette system at his disposal. Rita points the gun at Harry and Annabel and backs them into a closet. Rita apologizes to Tony for everything, and Tony forgives her (at gunpoint). Rita and Anthony take the diamond-laden corpse and depart ("Fancy Meeting You Here" (reprise)).

Harry and Annabel are left alone with each other. Harry locks the door of the hotel room to protect them from any more unwelcome intruders and persuades her to stay with him in Monte Carlo. Harry and Annabel kiss ("Act II Finale: Good to Be Alive").

== Major characters ==
- Harry Witherspoon — a shy English shoe salesman
- Annabel Glick — a no-nonsense representative of the Universal Dog Home of Brooklyn
- Rita LaPorta — the high-strung lover of the dead Tony Hendon
- Vinnie DiRuzzio — Rita's mild-mannered brother; an optometrist
- Luigi Gaudi — a mysterious, boisterous Italian
- Dominique du Monaco — a seductive French nightclub singer
- Emcee — the emcee of a glitzy Monte Carlo nightclub
- The dead body of Anthony Hendon — the corpse of Harry's uncle, fixed up so he looks alive
- Landlady — the mean-spirited owner of Harry's apartment house

== Principal casts ==
Character	Off-Broadway	West End
Character	1988	1997
Harry Witherspoon	Stephen Stout	Paul Baker
Annabel Glick	Julie White	Frances Ruffelle
Rita LaPorta	Mary Testa	Tracie Bennett
Vinnie DiRuzzio	Stuart Zagnit	Unknown
Luigi Gaudi	Paul Kandel	Unknown
Dominique du Monaco	Patty Holley	Alix Longman
Emcee	Michael McCarty	Unknown
Anthony Hendon	Ron Faber	Unknown

== Musical numbers ==
Act I

- "Something Funny's Going On" – Company
- "Mr. Witherspoon's Friday Night" – Harry, Landlady, Telegram Deliverer, Spinster, Lorry Driver, Punk
- "Rita's Confession" – Rita and Vinnie
- "Good To Be Alive" – Harry, Luigi, and Company
- "Lucky" – Harry
- "Dogs Vs. You" – Harry and Annabel
- "The Phone Call" – Vinnie
- "A Day Around Town (Dance)" – Company
- "Monte Carlo!" – Emcee
- "Speaking French" – Dominique du Monaco
- "Times Like This" – Annabel
- "Monte Carlo! (Reprise)" – Emcee
- "Fancy Meeting You Here" – Rita
- "Act I Finale: Good To Be Alive" – Company

Act II

- "Something Funny's Going On (Reprise)" – Company
- "Him, Them, It, Her" – Harry, Annabel, Rita, Vinnie, and Company
- "Nice" – Annabel and Harry
- "Welcome Back, Mr. Witherspoon" – Company
- "A Woman In My Bathroom" – Harry
- "Nice (Reprise)" – Harry and Annabel
- "Confession #2 (Reprise)" – Tony, Rita, Harry, and Annabel
- "Fancy Meeting You Here (Reprise)" – Rita and Tony
- "Act II Finale: Good To Be Alive" – Company

== 2014 film version ==
A feature film version of Lucky Stiff, adapted by Ahrens and directed by Christopher Ashley, premiered at the 2014 Montreal World Film Festival and was seen at other film festivals. It stars Dominic Marsh as Harry and features Don Amendolia as uncle Tony, Nikki M. James as Annabel, Jason Alexander as Vinnie, Mary Birdsong as the saucy French maid, and Dennis Farina as Luigi. It includes additional songs by Ahrens and Flaherty. When the film opened in theatres for a limited release in July 2015, reviews were mostly negative.

== General references ==
- Lucky Stiff synopsis at guidetomusicaltheatre.com
- Profile of the show
- Lucky Stiff at the Music Theatre International website
- New Yorker. May 9, 1988, volume 64, no. 12, p. 100
- Variety. May 25, 1988, volume 331, no.5, p. 104
- Washington Times. May 8, 1989, p. E1 ("Musical Is Lucky for Theatergoers")
- The Baltimore Sun. May 9, 1989, p. 3C. ("Olney's Delightfully Zany Lucky Stiff")
