= Endgame (play) =

Play by Samuel Beckett

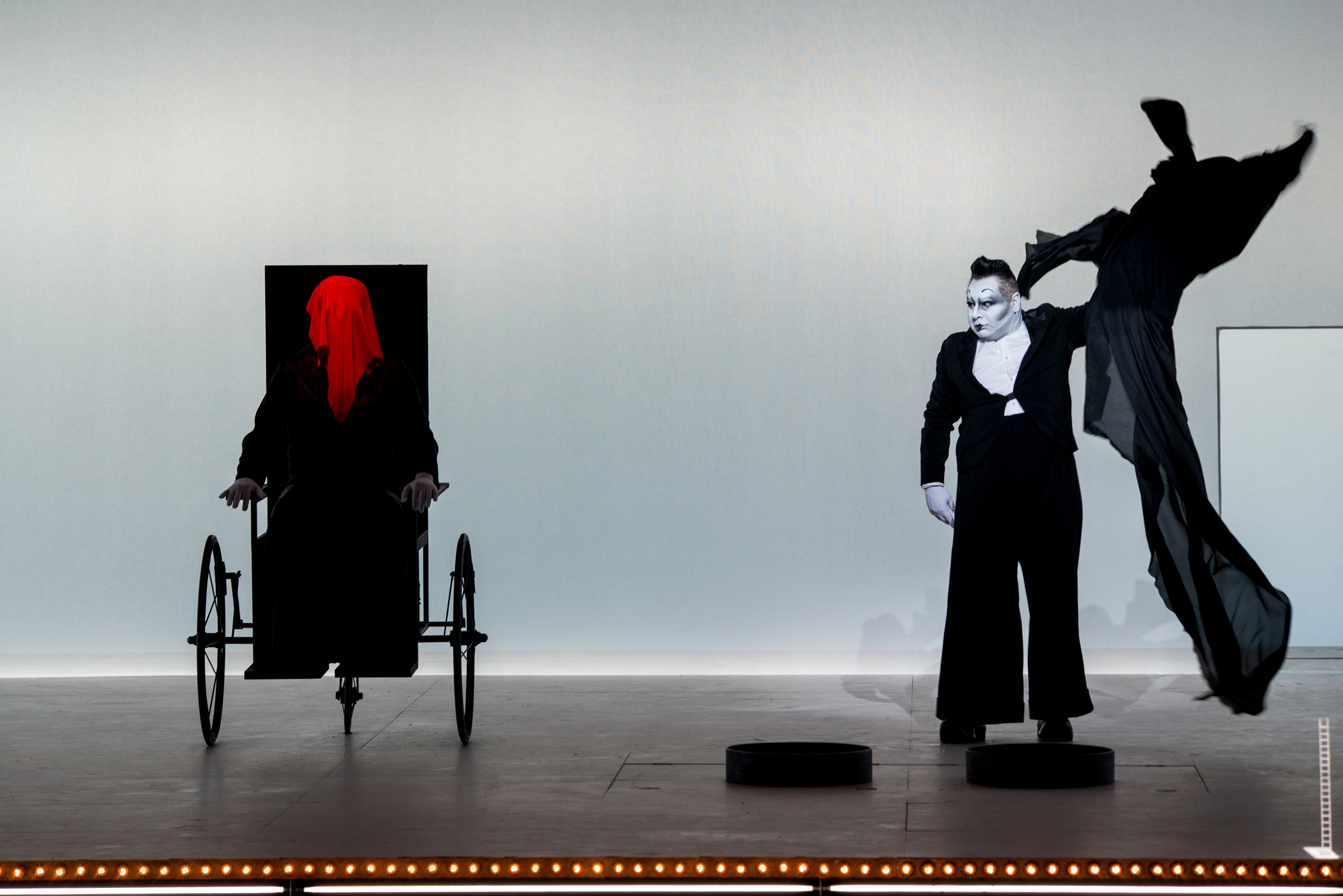
- Berliner Ensemble, 2016 directed by Robert Wilson
- Original language: French
- Written by: Samuel Beckett
- Characters: Hamm; Clov; Nagg; Nell
- Genre: Tragicomedy, absurdist fiction

Premiere
- Date: 3 April 1957
- Place: Royal Court Theatre, London

Endgame is an absurdist, tragicomic one-act play by the Irish playwright Samuel Beckett. First performed in London in 1957, it is about a blind, paralysed, domineering elderly man, his geriatric parents, and his servile companion in an abandoned house in a fictional post-apocalyptic wasteland, all of whom await an unspecified "end". Much of the play's content consists of terse, back and forth dialogue between the characters reminiscent of bantering, along with trivial stage actions. The plot is also supplanted by the development of a grotesque story-within-a-story that the character Hamm is relating. The play's title refers to chess and frames the characters as acting out a losing battle with each other or their fate.

Originally written in French (titled Fin de partie), the play was translated into English by Beckett himself and first performed on 3 April 1957 at the Royal Court Theatre in London in a French-language production. It is usually considered among Beckett's most notable works. The literary critic Harold Bloom called it the most original work of literature of the 20th century, saying that "[Other dramatists of the time] have no Endgame; to find a drama of its reverberatory power, you have to return to Ibsen." Beckett considered it his masterpiece and saw it as the most aesthetically perfect, compact representation of his artistic views on human existence.

Endgame is one of the most significant plays in Beckett's body of work and in the broader context of 20th-century drama, particularly in the Theatre of the Absurd genre. Its importance lies in its exploration of various existential themes, its minimalist and bleak portrayal of human existence, and its influence on subsequent playwrights.

== Characters ==
- Hamm: throughout the play remains seated in an armchair fitted with casters, unable to stand, and blind. Hamm is dominating, acrimonious, banterous and comfortable in his misery. He claims to suffer, but his pessimism seems self-elected. He chooses to be isolated and self-absorbed. His relationships appear parched of human empathy; he refers to his father as a "fornicator", refused to help his neighbour with oil for her lamp when she badly needed it, and has a fake pet dog which is a stuffed animal.
- Clov: Hamm's servant who is unable to sit. Taken in by Hamm as a child, Clov is wistful. He longs for something else, but has nothing to pursue. More mundane than Hamm, he reflects on his opportunities but takes little charge. Clov is benevolent, but weary.
- Nagg: Hamm's father who has no legs and lives in a dustbin. Nagg is gentle and fatherly, yet sorrowful and aggrieved in the face of his son's ingratitude.
- Nell: Hamm's mother who has no legs and lives in a dustbin next to Nagg. Reflective, she delivers a monologue about a beautiful day on Lake Como, and apparently dies during the course of the play.

Samuel Beckett said that in his choice of character's names, he had in mind the word "hammer" and the word "nail" (clou in French, Nagel in German).

Beckett was an avid chess player, and the term endgame refers to the final phase of a chess game. The play can be vaguely seen as a kind of metaphorical chess game, albeit with limited symbolic meaning. Hamm says at one point, "My kingdom for a knight-man!" Limited in his movement, Hamm resembles the king on a chessboard, and Clov, who moves for him, a knight.

== Synopsis ==
In a dreary, dim and nondescript room, Clov draws the curtains from the windows and prepares his master Hamm for his day. He says, "It's nearly finished", though it is not clear what he is referring to. He awakes Hamm by pulling a sheet from over him. After Hamm removes a bloodstained handkerchief from over his head and face, he says "It's time it ended." He summons Clov by means of a whistle, and they banter briefly.

Eventually, Hamm's parents, Nell and Nagg, appear from inside two dustbins at the back of the stage. Hamm is as equally threatening, condescending and acrimonious with his parents as with his servant, though they still share a degree of mutual humour. Nell eventually sinks back into her bin, and Clov, examining her, says, "She has no pulse." Hamm tells his father he is telling a story and recites it partially to him, a fragment which treats on a derelict man who comes crawling on his belly to the narrator, who is putting up Christmas decorations, begging him for food for his starving boy sheltering in the wilderness.

Clov returns, and they continue to banter in a way that is both quick-witted and comical, yet with dark undertones. Clov often threatens to leave Hamm, but it is made clear that he has nowhere to go as the world outside seems to be destroyed. Much of the stage action is intentionally banal and monotonous, including sequences where Clov moves Hamm's chair in various directions so that he feels himself to be in the right position, as well as moving him nearer to the window.

By the end of the play, Clov finally seems intent on pursuing his commitment to leaving his cruel master Hamm. Clov tells him there is no more of the painkiller left, of which Hamm has been insisting on getting his dose throughout the play. Hamm finishes his dark, chilling story by having the narrator berate the collapsed man for the futility of trying to feed his son for a few more days when evidently their luck has run out (it becomes plain that the character of the narrator is Hamm himself, relating the events which brought Clov [the man's son] to him). Hamm, blind, believes Clov has left, but Clov re-enters and stands in the room silently with his coat on and carrying luggage, going nowhere. Hamm calls for his father, but receives no answer; he discards some of his belongings and says that, though he has made his exit, his bloodstained handkerchief, which he replaces over his face and head, will "remain".

== Themes ==
Themes of Endgame include decay, insatiety and dissatisfaction, pain, monotony, absurdity, humour, horror, meaninglessness, nothingness, existentialism, nonsense, solipsism and people's inability to relate to or find completion in one another. Other themes include narrative or story-telling, family relations, nature, destruction, abandonment, and sorrow.

== Key features, symbols and motifs ==
In Samuel Beckett's Endgame, the play's world unravels. Themes such as repetition, dependency, and the breakdown of meaning in the "Endless Ending", are explored, and scholars have emphasised and debated the play's cyclical structure. Where the narrative goes against closure and rather presents what S. E. Gontarski describes as an "End" that continually repeats rather than having a conclusion. This structure gives foundation to all the other themes, such as repetition and dependency, which provide the sense that the characters in the play exist in a perpetual state of ending without resolution.

The play's setting has a significant role in its major themes and is a unique symbol often perceived as a post-apocalyptic world. To the single room in which the play takes place. The "barren waste land" outside illustrates to the audience a sense of despair and dependency. The characters constantly rely on the room or house to provide safety and comfort until the end, when Clov "leaves". The environment has been characterised as one in which the "end" has already occurred, leaving the characters to confront existential questions in a world that appears to have reached its end. This further exemplifies the existential concerns regarding meaning, survival, and the persistence of human activity in the play.

Endgame includes recurring motifs such as failed communication and the tension between ending and continuation. One that stands out most is the repetition and routine of the play as a whole. Most of the actions and dialogue recur with minimal variation, reinforcing a sense of stasis, as though the audience is rewatching the play while watching it for the first time. S. E. Gontarski suggests that, although the notion of an 'endgame' is borrowed from chess, suggesting a final stage in which few moves remain, yet, the play resists arriving at a definitive conclusion. This keeps the characters in the play and the audience in a constant endgame.

Hamm's story is broken up and told in segments throughout the play. It serves essentially as part of the climax of Endgame, albeit somewhat inconclusively.

Hamm's story is gripping for how the narrative tone it is told in contrasts with the way the play the characters are in seems to be written or proceed. Whereas Endgame is somehow lurching, starting and stopping, rambling, unbearably impatient and sometimes incoherent, Hamm's story in some ways has a much clearer, liquid, fluid, descriptive narrative lens to it. In fact, in the way it uses run-of-the-mill literary techniques like describing the setting, facial expressions or an exchange of dialogue, in slightly bizarre ways, it seems like a parody of writing itself. Beckett's eerie stories about people at their last gasp often doing or seeking something futile is central to his art. It could be taken to represent the inanity of existence, but it also seems to hint at mocking not only life but storytelling itself, inverting and negating the literary craft with stories that are idiotically written and overwrought.

Characteristic Beckettian features in Endgame include bicycles, a seemingly imaginary son, pity, darkness, a shelter, and a story being recited within the play.

The play has postmodernist and metafictional elements, including the characters recurrently hinting that they are aware they are characters in a play.

== Production history ==
The play was premiered on 3 April 1957 at the Royal Court Theatre, London, performed in French. The production was directed by Roger Blin, who also played Hamm, with Jean Martin as Clov, Georges Adet as Nagg and Christine Tsingos as Nell.

Other early productions included a 1958 production at the Cherry Lane Theatre in New York, directed by Alan Schneider with Lester Rawlins as Hamm, Alvin Epstein as Clov, Nydia Westman as Nell and P. J. Kelly as Nagg (a recording of the play, with Gerald Hiken replacing Epstein, was released by Evergreen Records in 1958); and at the Royal Court Theatre in London directed by George Devine who also played Hamm, with Jack MacGowran as Clov.

In the early 1960s, an English language production produced by Philippe Staib and directed by Beckett, with Patrick Magee and Jack MacGowran, was staged at the Studio des Champs-Elysees, Paris. After the Paris production, Beckett directed two other productions of the play: at the Schiller Theater Werkstatt, Berlin, 26 September 1967, with Ernst Schröder as Hamm and Horst Bollmann as Clov; and at the Riverside Studios, London, May 1980 with Rick Cluchey as Hamm and Bud Thorpe as Clov.

In 1984, JoAnne Akalaitis directed the play at the American Repertory Theatre in Cambridge, Massachusetts. The production featured music from Philip Glass and was set in a derelict subway tunnel. Grove Press, the owner of Beckett's work, took legal action against the theatre. The issue was settled out of court through the agreement of an insert into the program, part of which was written by Beckett:

Any production of Endgame which ignores my stage directions is completely unacceptable to me. My play requires an empty room and two small windows. The American Repertory Theater production which dismisses my directions is a complete parody of the play as conceived by me. Anybody who cares for the work couldn't fail to be disgusted by this.

In 1985, Beckett directed Waiting for Godot, Krapp's Last Tape and Endgame as stage pieces with the San Quentin Players. All three productions were grouped together under the title Beckett Directs Beckett, and the production toured Europe and parts of Asia.

In 1991, a TV movie production was filmed with Stephen Rea as Clov, Norman Beaton as Hamm, Charlie Drake as Nagg and Kate Binchy as Nell.

In 1992, a videotaped production directed by Beckett, with Walter Asmus as the television director, was made as part of the Beckett Directs Beckett series, with Rick Cluchey as Hamm, Bud Thorpe as Clov, Alan Mandell as Nagg and Teresita Garcia-Suro as Nell.

A production with Michael Gambon as Hamm and David Thewlis as Clov and directed by Conor McPherson was filmed in 2000 as part of the Beckett on Film project.

In 2004, a production with Michael Gambon as Hamm and Lee Evans as Clov was staged at London's Albery Theatre, directed by Matthew Warchus.

In 2005, Tony Roberts starred as Hamm in a production directed by Charlotte Moore at the Irish Repertory Theater in New York City with Alvin Epstein as Nagg, Adam Heller as Clov and Kathryn Grody as Nell.

In 2008 there was a brief revival staged at the Brooklyn Academy of Music starring John Turturro as Hamm, Max Casella as Clov, Alvin Epstein as Nagg and Elaine Stritch as Nell. New York theatre veteran Andrei Belgrader directed, replacing originally-sought Sam Mendes.

In 2009, the British theatre company Complicité staged the play in London's West End with Mark Rylance as Hamm and Simon McBurney (who also directed the production) as Clov. The production also featured Tom Hickey as Nagg and Miriam Margolyes as Nell. The production opened on 2 October 2009 at the Duchess Theatre. Tim Hatley designed the set.

In 2010, Steppenwolf Theatre Company staged Endgame. It was directed by Frank Galati and starred Ian Barford as Clov, William Petersen as Hamm, Francis Guinan as Nagg, and Martha Lavey as Nell. James Schuette was responsible for set and scenic design.

In 2015, two of Australia's major state theatre companies staged the play. For Sydney Theatre Company, Andrew Upton directed the production, featuring Hugo Weaving as Hamm, and for Melbourne Theatre Company, Colin Friels starred in a production directed by Sam Strong and designed by visual artist Callum Morton.

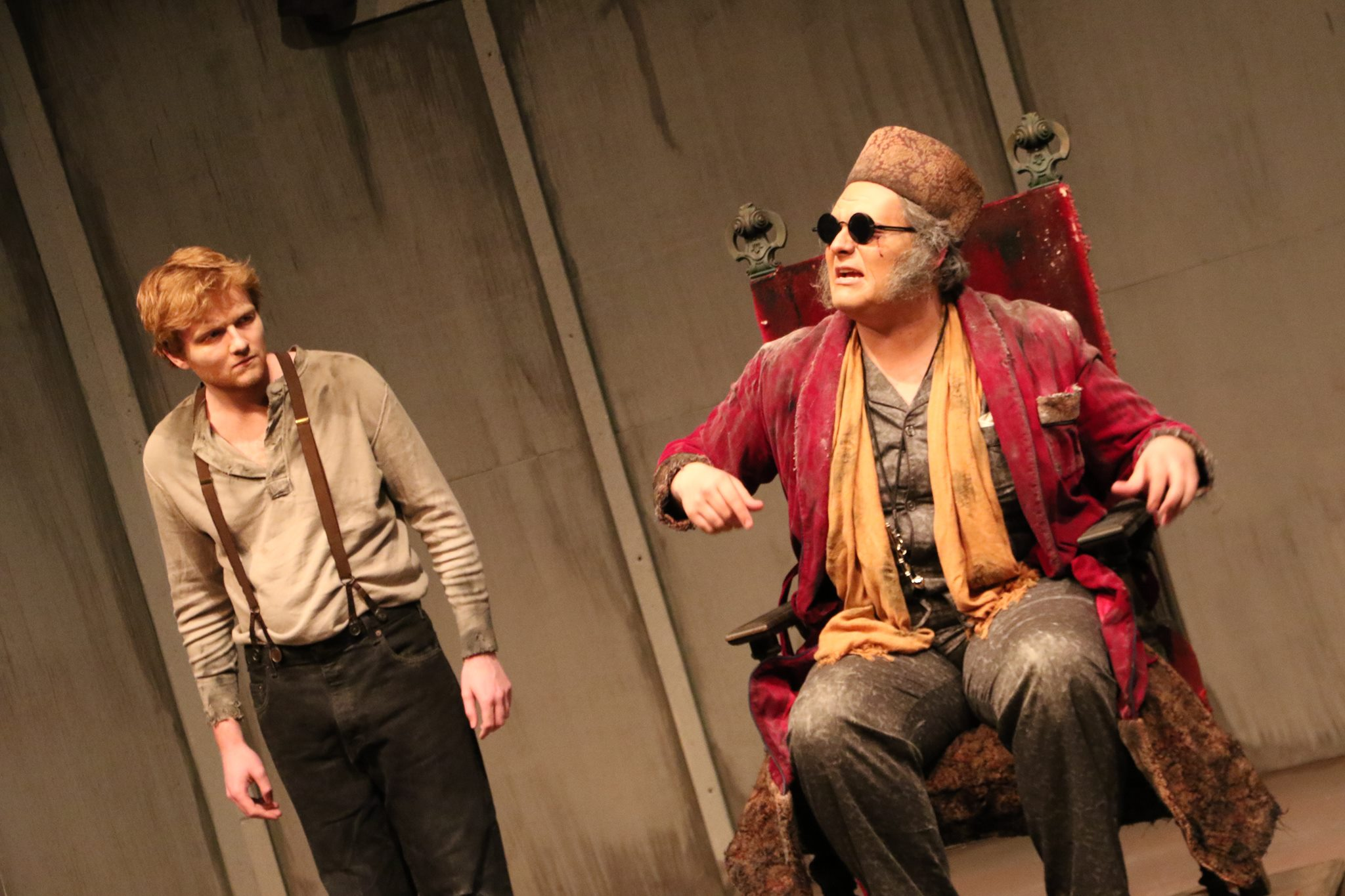
Gustavus Adolphus College production with Thomas Buan and Samuel Keillor, directed by Amy Seham, 2016

In 2016, Coronation Street actors David Neilson and Chris Gascoyne starred in a staging of the play at both the Citizens Theatre in Glasgow and HOME in Manchester.

In 2019, the play was produced by Pan Pan Theatre at the Project Arts Centre in Dublin. The production was directed by Gavin Quinn and starred Andrew Bennett, Des Keogh, Rosaleen Linehan and Antony Morris. The production was designed by Aedin Cosgrove.

In 2020, the Old Vic in London staged a production directed by Richard Jones with Alan Cumming as Hamm, Daniel Radcliffe as Clov, Jane Horrocks as Nell and Karl Johnson as Nagg in a double bill with Rough for Theatre II. Unfortunately, the production had to end its run two weeks earlier than its planned closing date of 28 March 2020 due to concerns over an outbreak of COVID-19.

Dublin's Gate Theatre staged the play in 2022. Directed by Danya Taymor, Hamm was played by Frankie Boyle and Clov by Robert Sheehan, with Seán McGinley and Gina Moxley as Nagg and Nell.

The French version was staged in 2022 at the Théâtre de l'Atelier in Paris. Jacques Osinski directed, Hamm was played by Frédéric Leidgens, Clov by Denis Lavant, Nagg and Nell by Peter Bonke and Claudine Delvaux.

A new production directed by Ciarán O'Reilly opened at the Irish Repertory Theater in New York City with previews beginning 25 January 2023 and an opening date of 2 February, with John Douglas Thompson as Hamm, Bill Irwin as Clov, Joe Grifasi as Nagg and Patrice Johnson Chevannes as Nell. The production was originally scheduled to run until 12 March, but was extended until 9 April.

== Adaptations ==
The play was adapted into an opera by György Kurtág, premiered at the Teatro alla Scala in 2018. The opera was originally commissioned by Alexander Pereira for the Salzburg Festival.

== Sources ==
- Adorno, Theodor W.; Jones, Michael T. (1982). "Trying to Understand Endgame". New German Critique (26): 119–150. doi:10.2307/488027. JSTOR 488027. INIST 12309609. Rpt. in The Adorno Reader. Ed. Brian O'Connor. London: Blackwell, 2000. 319–352. ISBN 0-631-21077-6.
- Beckett, Samuel (2019). Gontarski, Stanley (ed.). Volume II: Endgame. The Theatrical Notebooks of Samuel Beckett. Faber & Faber. ISBN 978-0571348718.
- Byron, Mark S., ed. (2007). Samuel Beckett’s Endgame. Amsterdam: Editions Rodopi B.V. ISBN 978-9042022881.
- Cavell, Stanley (22 October 2015). "Ending the Waiting Game: A Reading of Beckett's Endgame". Must We Mean What We Say?: A Book of Essays. Cambridge University Press. pp. 107–150. ISBN 978-1-107-11363-3.
- Cohn, Ruby (2020). Back to Beckett. Princeton University Press. ISBN 978-0691062563.
- McCarthy, Sean (1 March 2009). "Giving Sam a Second Life: Beckett's Plays in the Age of Convergent Media". Texas Studies in Literature and Language. 51 (1): 102–117. doi:10.1353/tsl.0.0017. JSTOR 40755533. S2CID 161238699. Gale A194981666 Project MUSE 258876.
