= Dennis Farina =

American actor (1944–2013)

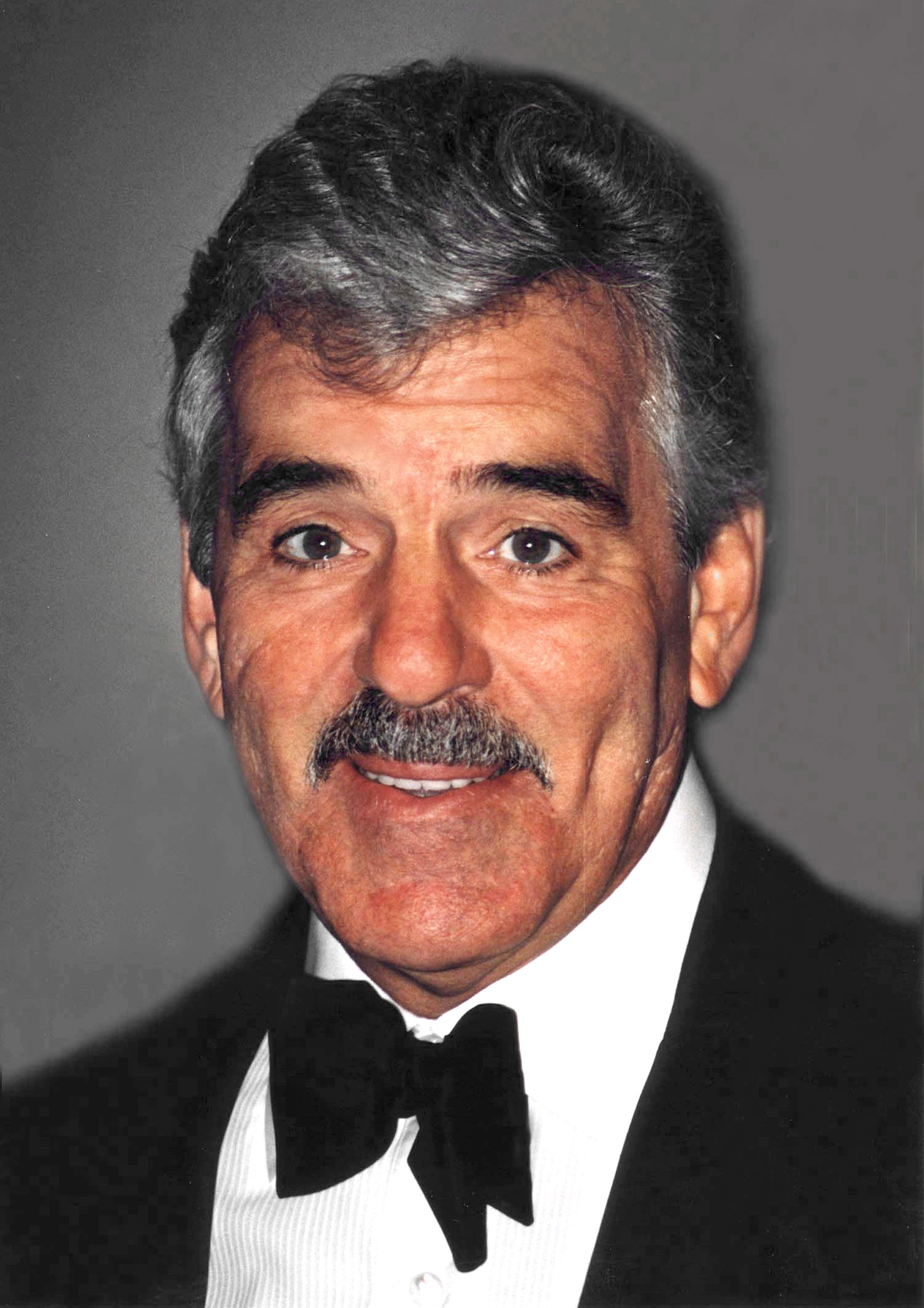
- Farina in 2000
- Born: Donaldo Gugliermo Farina; February 29, 1944; Chicago, Illinois, U.S.
- Died: July 22, 2013 (aged 69); Scottsdale, Arizona, U.S.
- Resting place: Mount Carmel Cemetery
- Occupation: Actor
- Years active: 1981–2013
- Spouse: Patricia Farina (m. 1970; div. 1980)
- Partner: Marianne Cahill
- Children: 3

Donaldo Gugliermo "Dennis" Farina (February 29, 1944 – July 22, 2013) was an American actor and Chicago police detective. Known for his roles as mobsters or police officers, his involvement in the entertainment industry began through his association with filmmaker Michael Mann, who employed Farina as an actor and technical advisor. After supporting parts in Mann's films Thief (1981) and Manhunter (1986), he was cast in the lead role of Lieutenant Mike Torello on the NBC television series Crime Story, produced by Mann.

Farina's other notable roles included New York City Police Department Detective Joe Fontana in seasons 15 and 16 of Law & Order (2004–2006), Jimmy Serrano in Midnight Run, Ray "Bones" Barboni in Get Shorty, Abraham "Cousin Avi" Denovitz in Snatch, Walt Miller on New Girl, and Gus Demitriou on HBO's Luck. He also worked as a stage actor with the Steppenwolf Theater Company in Chicago.

== Early life and police career ==
Farina was born on a leap day (February 29, 1944) in Chicago's Old Town neighborhood, the fourth son and youngest of the seven children of Joseph and Yolanda Farina. Farina's father, who was from Villalba, Sicily, was a Chicago-area doctor, and his mother a homemaker. They raised their children in a North Avenue home in Old Town, a working-class neighborhood with a broad ethnic mixture, with Italians and Germans the predominant ethnicities.

Before becoming an actor, Farina served three years (from 1962 to 1965) in the United States Army during the Vietnam Era, followed by 18 years in the Chicago Police Department (1967 to 1985), during which he advanced from patrolman to detective.

== Acting career ==
=== Stage performances ===
In 1982, while still working as a detective, he made his stage debut in the Steppenwolf Theater Company production of A Prayer for My Daughter, directed by John Malkovich. Chicago Tribune critic Richard Christianson criticized the production but said that Farina and other actors had "moments that were riveting."

Reviewing a 1983 production of David Rabe's Streamers, Christianson praised Farina's performance as "beautiful" and said "he is becoming a fine actor." In 1984, he appeared as Nick in a Chicago production of William Saroyan's The Time of Your Life. Ted Levine, who appeared with him in Crime Story, was in the cast.

=== Film and TV career ===
Farina began working for director Michael Mann as a police consultant, which led Mann to cast him in a small role in the 1981 film Thief. Farina worked with Mann again, as mobster Albert Lombard, in several episodes of Miami Vice. He moonlighted as an actor in Chicago-based films (like Code of Silence, a 1985 Chuck Norris film) and theater before Mann chose him for his Crime Story series, which aired on NBC from 1986 to 1988. His role of Detective Lt. Mike Torello on Crime Story was as a Chicago police officer, assigned to the U.S. Justice Department. He later starred as the title character in Buddy Faro, a short-lived 1998 private detective series on CBS.

Farina played mob boss Jimmy Serrano in the comedy-crime film Midnight Run; and Ray "Bones" Barboni, a rival criminal to Chili Palmer, in Get Shorty. He played FBI Agent Jack Crawford in Michael Mann's Manhunter, the first film to feature the character Hannibal Lecter. His other film appearances include Steven Spielberg's Saving Private Ryan, Striking Distance, Another Stakeout, Snatch, The Mod Squad, Reindeer Games, Men of Respect, Big Trouble and Out of Sight. He played a baseball manager in Little Big League and a nemesis basketball coach in Eddie.

He appeared in two television network miniseries based on Joe McGinniss's true-crime books, Blind Faith (1990) and Cruel Doubt (1992). He made a rare western, portraying legendary lawman Charlie Siringo in a 1995 television movie, Bonanza: Under Attack, a followup to the hit 1960s series.

In a departure from his usual parts, he had a leading-man role, co-starring with Bette Midler, in the romantic comedy That Old Feeling (1997), directed by Carl Reiner.

Farina won an American Comedy Award for his performance in Get Shorty, and starred in the television sitcom In-Laws from 2002 until 2003. He appeared in the 2002 film Stealing Harvard, a comedy where he played a tough-talking, overprotective father-in-law. He had comic roles opposite Ed Harris and Helen Hunt in the HBO production of Empire Falls in 2005, and opposite Alan Rickman in the 2008 Bottle Shock.

Working as a voice-actor beginning in 2005, he provided the voice of aging boxer-turned-superhero Wildcat on Justice League Unlimited. In 2013, he voiced the father of Daffy Duck's girlfriend on The Looney Tunes Show, and the character Riggs on Doc McStuffins. He also played himself in an episode of Family Guy called "The Most Interesting Man in the World," which would be his final television acting role that aired posthumously in 2014.

In 2004, producers of the television series Law & Order hired him as Detective Joe Fontana, following the death of longtime cast member Jerry Orbach. Farina stayed on the show for two seasons. In 2006, he left Law & Order for other projects, including the 2007 feature You Kill Me opposite Ben Kingsley and the 2008 What Happens in Vegas with Cameron Diaz and Ashton Kutcher.

In October 2008, he became the new host of Unsolved Mysteries when it returned to television with a new five-season, 175-episode run on Spike TV. Farina replaced Robert Stack, who had hosted the series for its prior 15-year run. This version featured re-edited segments from previous incarnations on NBC, CBS and Lifetime.

He played the title role in a 2011 independent film, The Last Rites of Joe May, written and directed by Joe Maggio, shot on location in Chicago. He was among the stars of a 2014 release, Authors Anonymous, playing a wannabe novelist with a fantasy of becoming another Tom Clancy.

Again on television, Farina co-starred in the 2012 HBO horse-race gambling series Luck, with Dustin Hoffman, directed by Michael Mann. He had a recurring guest role in 2013 in the television comedy series New Girl, though his character was killed off prior to his death.

Farina's last film role was as an aging Italian playboy in a film version of the Off-Broadway musical Lucky Stiff co-starring Dominic Marsh, Nikki M. James and Jason Alexander. The film, released posthumously in 2014, was dedicated to his memory.

== Personal life ==
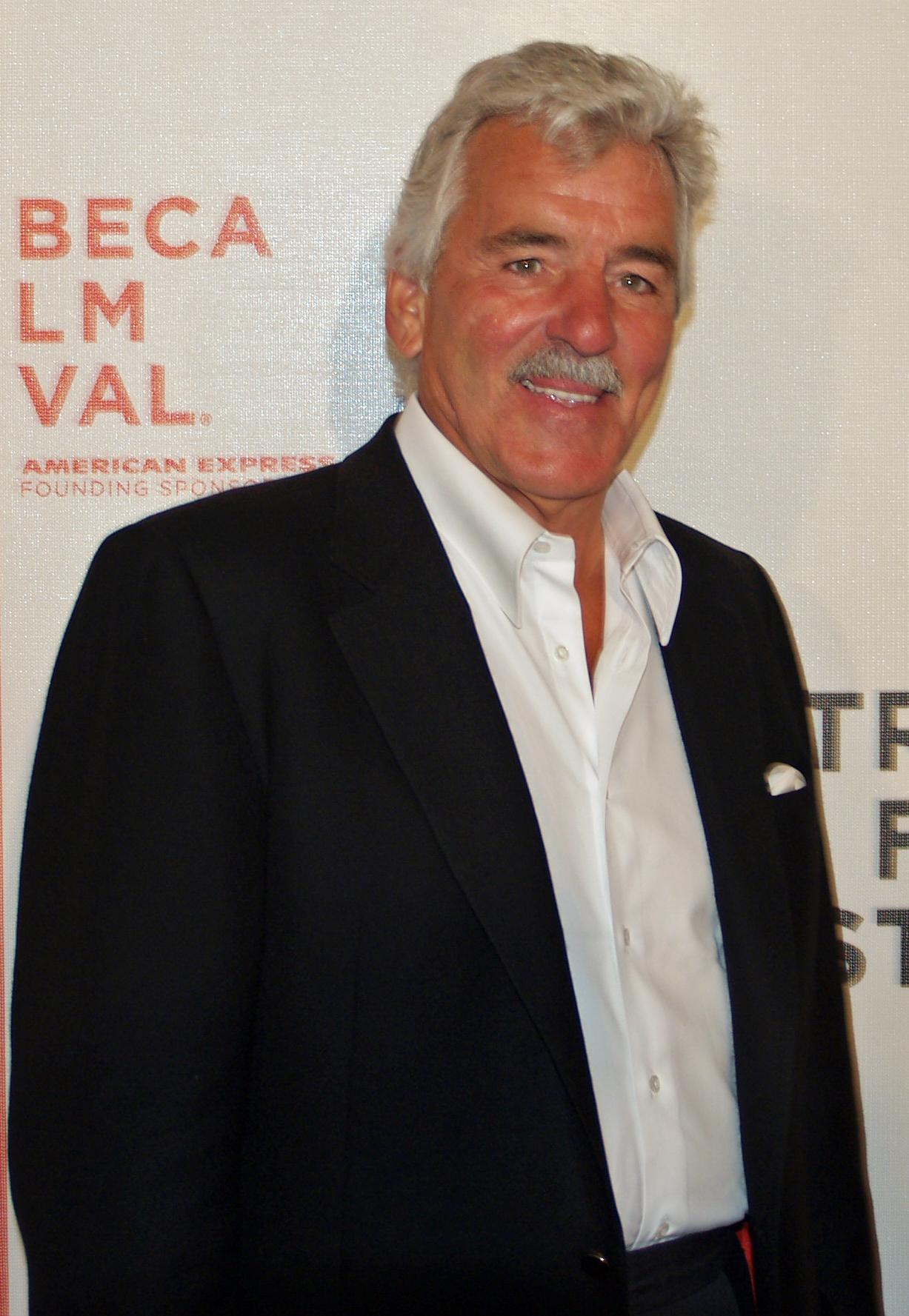
Farina at Tribeca Film Festival in 2007

Farina was married to Patricia Farina from 1970 until their divorce in 1980. They had three sons, Dennis Jr., Michael and Joseph (who is also an actor); two granddaughters, Brianna and Olivia; and four grandsons, Michael, Tyler, Matthew and Eric. He lived with his longtime girlfriend Marianne Cahill in Chicago and Scottsdale, Arizona.

A lifelong Chicago Cubs fan, he played a Cubs fan in a 1988 revival of the successful 1977 Organic Theater Company stage play Bleacher Bums, written by and starring fellow Chicago actors Joe Mantegna and Dennis Franz.

In February 2005, Farina won the Scripps Howard Super Sage Award. He was the only participant in Scripps Howard's Celebrity Super Bowl Poll to correctly predict New England Patriots would beat Philadelphia Eagles in Super Bowl XXXIX.

Farina was arrested on May 11, 2008, for carrying a loaded .22-caliber pistol through Los Angeles International Airport security. He was charged with carrying a concealed weapon, with bail set at $25,000. He claimed he had simply forgotten the weapon was still in his briefcase and never intended to take it on a plane. After police determined the weapon was unregistered, the charges were upgraded to a felony and bail was increased to $35,000. After reaching a plea agreement with prosecutors, he pleaded no contest and was sentenced to two years' probation on July 17, 2008.

== Death ==
Farina died on July 22, 2013 at the age of 69 (17 Leap years) in a Scottsdale, Arizona hospital from a pulmonary embolism. He was buried at Mount Carmel Cemetery in Hillside, Illinois.

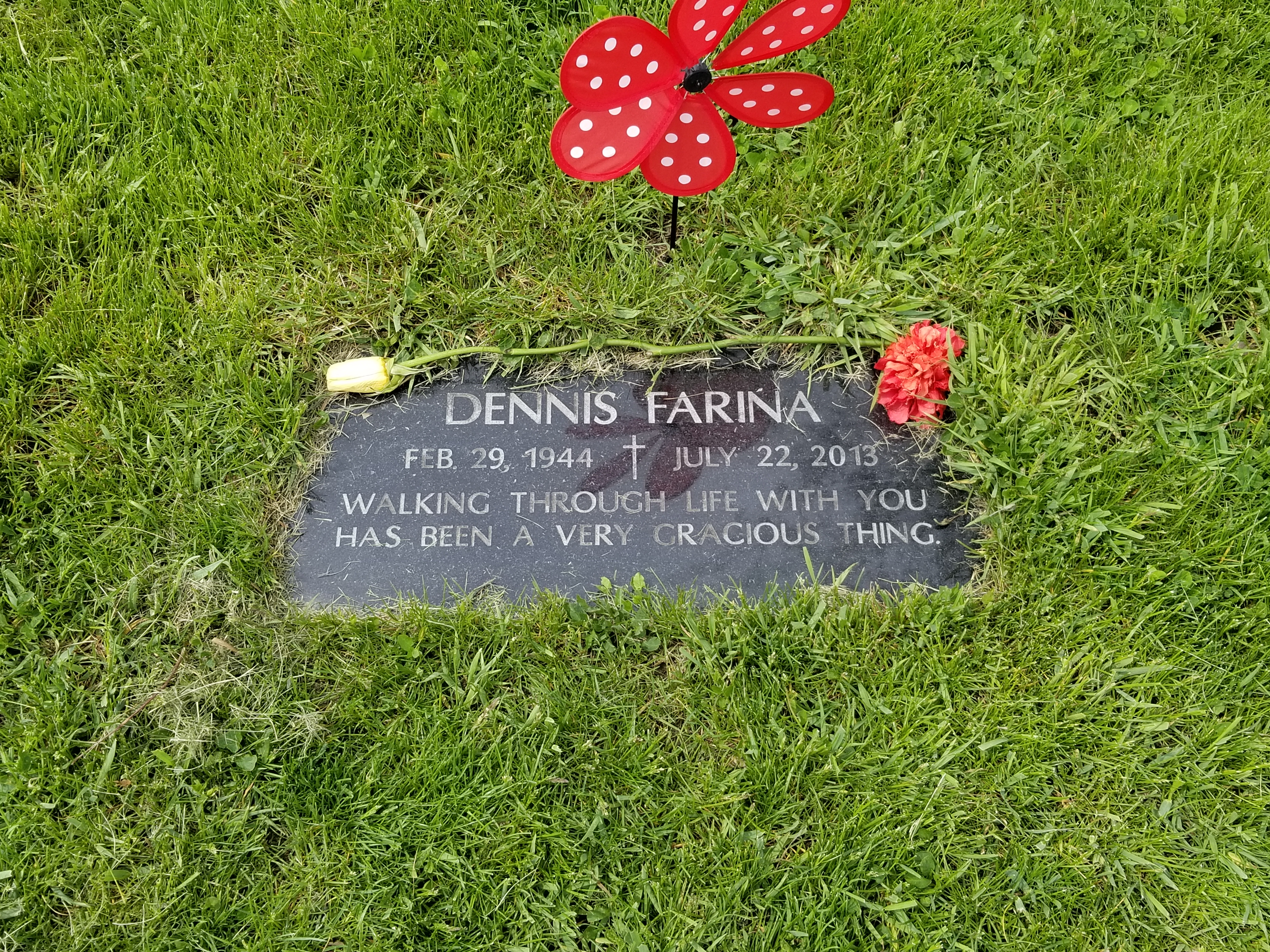
Farina's grave marker

== Filmography ==
Film
Year	Film	Role	Notes
1981	Thief	Carl	
1985	Code of Silence	Detective Dorato	
1986	Jo Jo Dancer, Your Life Is Calling	Freddy	
1986	Manhunter	Jack Crawford	
1988	Midnight Run	Jimmy Serrano	
1990	Men of Respect	"Bankie" Como	
1990	Havana	Joe Volpe's Assistant	Uncredited
1992	Mac	Mr. Stunder	
1992	We're Talking Serious Money	Sal	
1992	Street Crimes	Brian	
1993	Another Stakeout	Brian O'Hara	
1993	Romeo Is Bleeding	Nick Gazzara	Uncredited
1993	Striking Distance	Captain Nick Detillo	
1994	Little Big League	George O'Farrell	
1995	Get Shorty	Ray "Bones" Barboni	
1996	Eddie	Coach John Bailey	
1997	That Old Feeling	Dan De Mora	
1998	Out of Sight	Marshall Sisco	
1998	Saving Private Ryan	Lieutenant Colonel Walter Anderson	
1999	The Mod Squad	Captain Adam Greer	
2000	Reindeer Games	Jack Bangs	
2000	Preston Tylk	Dick Muller	
2000	Snatch	Abraham "Avi" Denovitz	
2001	Sidewalks of New York	Carpo	
2002	Big Trouble	Henry DeSalvo	
2002	Stealing Harvard	Mr. Warner	
2004	Paparazzi	Detective Burton	
2004	Scrambled Eggs	Dr. Carlson	Short film
2007	You Kill Me	Edward O'Leary	
2007	Purple Violets	Glen Gilmore	
2007	The Grand	L.B.J. Deuce Fairbanks	
2007	National Lampoon's Bag Boy	Marty Engstrom	
2008	Bottle Shock	Maurice Cantavale	
2008	What Happens in Vegas	Richard Banger	
2010	Knucklehead	Earl "Memphis Earl"	
2011	The Last Rites of Joe May	Joe May	
2014	Authors Anonymous	John K. Butzin	Posthumous release
2014	Lucky Stiff	Luigi Guadi	Posthumous release

=== Television ===
Television
Year	Title	Role	Notes
1983	Through Naked Eyes	Patrolman	Television film
1984	The Killing Floor	Supervisor	Television film
1984	Hard Knox	April	Television film
1984–1989	Miami Vice	Albert Lombard	3 episodes
1985	Hardcastle and McCormick	Ed Coley	Episode: "Undercover McCormick"
1985	Hunter	Victor "Vic" Terranova	Episode: "The Snow Queen"
1985	Remington Steele	Cop	Episode: "Steele Trying"
1985	Final Jeopardy	Policeman #2	Television film
1986	The Birthday Boy	Diner Owner	Television film
1986	Jack and Mike	Councilman Kazan	Episode: "Pilot"
1986	Lady Blue	Joe Kaufman	Episode: "Sylvie"
1986	Triplecross	Ernie, Veteran Cop	Television film
1986–1988	Crime Story	Lieutenant Mike Torello	44 episodes
1987	Six Against the Rock	Robert Stroud / The Birdman of Alcatraz	Television film
1988	Open Admissions	Fred	Television film
1989	China Beach	Lieutenant Colonel Edward Edward Vincent	Episode: "All About E.E.V."
1989	The Case of the Hillside Stranglers	Angelo Buono Jr.	Television film
1990	Blind Faith	Prosecutor Kelly	Television film
1990	People Like Us	Elias Renthall	Television film
1991	Perfect Crimes	Armand Zaro	Television film
1992	Drug Wars: The Cocaine Cartel	Mike Cerone	Television film
1992	Cruel Doubt	Tom Bereton	Miniseries
1992	Tales from the Crypt	Antoine	Episode: "Werewolf Concerto"
1993	The Disappearance of Nora	Denton	Television film
1993	A Stranger in the Mirror		Television film
1994	One Woman's Courage	Craig McKenna	Television film
1994	The Corpse Had a Familiar Face	Detective Harry Lindstrom	Television film
1995	Out of Annie's Past	Charlie Ingle	Television film
1995	Bonanza: Under Attack	Charlie Siringo	Television film
1997	Bella Mafia	Don Roberto Luciano	Television film
1998	Buddy Faro	Buddy Faro	13 episodes
2002–2003	In-Laws	Victor Pellet	15 episodes
2004–2006	Law & Order	Detective Joe Fontana	Main role (seasons 15–16); 46 episodes
2005	Law & Order: Trial by Jury	Detective Joe Fontana	Episode: "Skeleton"
2005	Justice League Unlimited	Wildcat	Voice, episode: "The Cat and the Canary"
2005	Empire Falls	Walt Comeau	Miniseries
2008–2010	Unsolved Mysteries	Host / The Narrator	175 episodes
2011–2012	Luck	Gus Demitriou	9 episodes
2012	Doc McStuffins	Riggo	Voice, episode: "Stuck Up"
2013	New Girl	Walt Miller	2 episodes
2013	The Looney Tunes Show	Frank Russo	Voice, episode: "Daffy Duck, Esquire"
2014	Family Guy	Himself	Voice, episode: "The Most Interesting Man in the World"; Posthumous release
