= Sally Murphy (actress) =

American actress (born 1962)

Sally Murphy (born 1962) is an American actress and singer. She has appeared in plays and musicals on Broadway, off-Broadway and regional theatre, including The Grapes of Wrath, Carousel, Fiddler on the Roof and August: Osage County. She has been a Steppenwolf Theatre Company member since 1993 and appeared in several of their productions. She has also appeared in films and on television.

== Early life and education ==
Murphy is the only child of Edward, an electrician, and Pat Murphy, a social worker. She grew up in Auburn Gresham, Chicago, Illinois. As a young child she did skits with neighborhood friends and studied piano. She appeared in school shows in junior high school and starred in musical performances and theater at Lincoln-Way High School in New Lenox, from which she graduated in 1980. She majored in voice at Northwestern University graduating in 1984.

== Career ==
After college, she performed in plays in Chicago, working with the Goodman Theatre in 1986. Three years later, she played Rose of Sharon in Steppenwolf Theatre Company’s adaptation of The Grapes of Wrath, along with Steppenwolf co-founder Gary Sinise (Tom Joad) and Lois Smith (Ma Joad). She repeated this role at La Jolla Playhouse, London’s National Theatre, and then Cort Theatre on Broadway. She also appeared in the television adaptation of the play for the PBS series American Playhouse in 1991. In the 1994 Broadway revival of the musical Carousel, Murphy played Julie Jordan alongside Audra McDonald as Carrie Pipperidge.

In 1995, after Murphy saw the hit play Skylight at London's National Theatre, she told Steppenwolf management she wanted to bring the play there, struck by its dramatic presentation of a relationship on stage and challenging role for the lead actress. Steppenwolf produced the play in 1997 with Murphy as Kyra Hollis.

In 2001 at the Vineyard Theatre, she portrayed Susan Smith in Cornelius Eady's two character play Brutal Imagination, which centers on the real-life 1994 case of Smith, a white woman from South Carolina who falsely claimed that an African American man had kidnapped her two young sons; she had drowned them herself. Joe Morton played the imaginary Black man Smith invented to blame for the crime. The actors reunited in 2025 to do a one night reading with proceeds benefiting the Innocence Project. She appeared in The Apple Family plays as the character Jane Apple in Regular Singing (2013), reprising the role in a Zoom format in 2020 when theaters were closed during the COVID-19 pandemic.

Murphy has been a member of Steppenwolf since 1993. Her credits there include The Common Pursuit (1988), The Grapes of Wrath (1989), Skylight (1997), Uncle Vanya (2001), Mother Courage and Her Children (2001), The Royal Family (2002), August: Osage County (2007), Sex with Strangers (2011), Time Stands Still (2012), The Minutes (2017), and Linda Vista (2017). Her Broadway credits include The Grapes of Wrath (1990), Carousel (1994), The Wild Party (2000), Fiddler on the Roof (2004), August: Osage County (2007), Linda Vista (2019), and The Minutes (2022). She was nominated for the Lucille Lortel Award for Outstanding Lead Actress in a Musical in 2015 for her performance as Jenny in The Threepenny Opera.

She also appeared in several films between 1992 and 2001.

== Theater ==
Year	Title	Role	Notes	Ref
1988	The Common Pursuit	Marigold	Steppenwolf Theatre	
1989	The Grapes of Wrath	Rose of Sharon	La Jolla Playhouse, National Theatre, Cort Theatre	
1990	Harvey	Myrtle Mae Simmons	Apollo Theater	
1991	Earthly Possessions	Mindy	Steppenwolf Theatre	
1994	Carousel	Julie Jordan	Vivian Beaumont Theater	
1996	Bernarda Alba	Amelia	Mitzi E. Newhouse Theater	
1997	Skylight	Kyra Hollis	Steppenwolf Theatre	
2000	The Wild Party	Sally	Virginia Theatre	
2001	Uncle Vanya	Yelena	Steppenwolf Studio	
2001	Mother Courage and Her Children	Katterin	Steppenwolf Theatre	
2001	Brutal Imagination	Susan Smith	Vineyard Theatre	
2002	The Royal Family	Gwen Cavendish	Steppenwolf Theatre	
2002	A Man of No Importance	Adele	Mitzi E. Newhouse Theater	
2004	Fiddler on the Roof	Tzeitel	Imperial Theatre	
2005	A Tree Grows in Brooklyn	Katie	City Center	
2007	August: Osage County	Ivy Weston	Downstairs Theatre, Imperial Theatre	
2011	Sex with Strangers	Olivia	Steppenwolf Theatre	
2012	Time Stands Still	Sarah	Upstairs Theatre	
2013	Regular Singing	Jane Apple	The Public Theater	
2014	The Threepenny Opera	Jenny Towler	Atlantic Theater Company, nominated for Lucille Lortel Award for Outstanding Lead Actress in a Musical	
2016	Angel Reapers	Mother Ann Lee	Signature Theatre	
2017/2022	The Minutes	Ms. Matz	Steppenwolf Theatre/Studio 54	
2017/2019	Linda Vista	Margaret	Steppenwolf Theatre/Hayes Theater	
2018	Admissions	Ginnie	Mitzi E. Newhouse Theater	
2020	Incidental Moments of the Day - The Apple Family: Life on Zoom	Jane Apple	YouTube	
2022	Downstate	Em	Playwrights Horizons	
2025	The Baker's Wife	Hortense	Classic Stage Company's Lynn F. Angelson Theater	

== Filmography (selected) ==
- Scent of a Woman (1992) .... Karen Rossi
- Victim of Love: The Shannon Mohr Story (1993, television film) .... Shannon Mohr Davis
- Fearless (1993) .... Jackie O'Neil
- If These Walls Could Talk (1996, HBO) .... Doreen
- Charming Billy (1999) .... Linda Starkman
- Pollock (2001) .... Edith Metzger
