= The Last Rites of Joe May =

- Theatrical release poster
- Directed by: Joe Maggio
- Written by: Joe Maggio
- Produced by: Bill Straus; Stephanie Striegel
- Starring: Dennis Farina; Jamie Anne Allman; Ian Barford; Meredith Droeger; Chelcie Ross; Gary Cole
- Cinematography: Jay Silver
- Edited by: Seth Anderson
- Music by: Lindsay Marcus
- Production companies: Billy Goat Pictures; Steppenwolf Films; You've Faded Films
- Distributed by: Tribeca Film
- Release dates: April 22, 2011 (Tribeca Film Festival); November 4, 2011 (United States)
- Running time: 106 minutes
- Country: United States
- Language: English

The Last Rites of Joe May is a 2011 American drama film written and directed by Joe Maggio. The film stars Dennis Farina (in his last role during his lifetime), Jamie Anne Allman, Ian Barford, Meredith Droeger, Chelcie Ross and Gary Cole. The film was released on November 4, 2011, by Tribeca Film.

== Plot ==
Leaving the hospital after a long stay there caused by pneumonia, Joe May returns alone to his Chicago neighborhood by bus and steps into a tavern, where he is greeted by a bartender with, "I thought you were dead."

His landlord thought likewise, renting out Joe's tenement apartment during his unexplained absence. Joe discovers a single mother and her young daughter, Jenny and Angelina, living there now. He respects their privacy and sleeps outdoors, unprepared for the frigid night in his thin leather jacket and risking a relapse of his illness.

After looking up his pal Billy in an assisted-living center, Joe accepts an offer by Angelina to share the apartment and rent. Leery at first of the little girl, he soon takes a liking to her, and she to him. He also takes an instant dislike to Jenny's boyfriend, an abusive police detective named Buczkowski.

In need of money, Joe seeks permission from a local crime figure, Lenny, to move some stolen meat. The scheme goes badly, Joe having great difficulty in carrying a heavy side of lamb by himself, with a hungry dog pursuing him through an alley. Cold, broke and lonely, he has little seemingly to live for, so when Jenny's boyfriend becomes violent again, Joe comes to her rescue, with fatal consequences.

== Cast ==
- Dennis Farina as Joe May
- Jamie Anne Allman as Jenny
- Ian Barford as Stanley Buczkowski
- Meredith Droeger as Angelina
- Chelcie Ross as Billy Tidrow
- Gary Cole as Lenny
- Matt DeCaro as Chevy
- Phil Ridarelli as Landlord
- Ernest Perry Jr. as Driver
- Mike Bacarella as George
- Rich Komenich as Seymour
- Craig Bailey as Cab Driver
- Roderick Peeples as Butcher Shop Manager
- Brian Boland as Scotty

== Release ==
The film premiered at the Tribeca Film Festival on April 22, 2011. The film was released on November 4, 2011, by Tribeca Film.
