= Lucky Stiff (2014 film) =

- Film poster
- Directed by: Christopher Ashley
- Screenplay by: Lynn Ahrens
- Based on: The Man Who Broke the Bank at Monte Carlo by Mike Butterworth; Lucky Stiff by Lynn Ahrens Stephen Flaherty
- Produced by: Victor Syrmis; J. Todd Harris
- Starring: Jason Alexander; Dennis Farina
- Cinematography: Greg Gardiner
- Edited by: Trudy Ship; Jeremiah O'Driscoll; Annette Davey
- Music by: Stephen Flaherty
- Production companies: Branded Pictures Entertainment; New Oz Productions
- Distributed by: Arclight Films; The Orchard; Abramorama
- Release date: August 22, 2014 (Montreal World Film Festival)
- Running time: 78 minutes 79 minutes
- Country: United States
- Language: English

Lucky Stiff is a 2014 American musical comedy film directed by Christopher Ashley and starring Jason Alexander and Dennis Farina (in his final film role). It is based on the 1988 musical of the same name by Lynn Ahrens and Stephen Flaherty and the 1983 novel The Man Who Broke the Bank at Monte Carlo by Mike Butterworth.

== Cast ==
- Dominic Marsh as Harry Witherspoon
- Nikki M. James as Annabel Glick
- Pamela Shaw as Rita LaPorta
- Jason Alexander as Vinnie Di Ruzzio
- Dennis Farina as Luigi Guadi
- Don Amendolia as Uncle Tony
- Katherine Shindle as Dominique
- Mary Birdsong as Maid
- Anthony Skordi as Nicky
- Jayne Houdyshell as Harry's Landlady
- Maggie Carney as Miss. Iris Crum
- Kent Avenido as Boy Hardwick
- Herschel Sparber as Bill Siller
- Steve West as Harry's Boss
- Mary Jo Catlett as Shoe Store Lady
- Noah Weisberg as Bellhop
- Cheyenne Jackson as Emcee
- Jennifer Cody as Mary Alice
- Jim Piddock as Mr. Hobbs
- Juliet Mills as Miss Thorsby
- Benjamin Stone as Telegraph Boy
- Paul Tigue as Mr. Loomis
- Kevin Chamberlin as Fred Mahew III
- Heather Ayers as Mrs. Delila Wagstiff-Duncan
- Chryssie Whitehead as Miss. Coco Blankship

== Production ==
The film was shot in Los Angeles and Monte Carlo.

== Release ==
The film premiered at the 2014 Montreal World Film Festival. It was then released in theaters and on VOD on 24 July 2015.

== Reception ==
The film has a 40% rating on Rotten Tomatoes. Wes Greene of Slant Magazine awarded the film half a star out of four.

Dennis Harvey of Variety gave the film a negative review and wrote, "Results are equal parts diverting and strained, most likely to please the same niche audiences who have given the material a modest stage shelf life for the last quarter-century."
