= Joe Maggio =

American director, screenwriter, and producer

- Born: Buffalo, New York, U.S.
- Occupations: Film director; screenwriter; film producer
- Years active: 2001–present

Joe Maggio is an American film director, screenwriter, and producer. He is best known for his work on the films Virgil Bliss, Paper Covers Rock, Bitter Feast, and The Last Rites of Joe May. He is also one of the founding editors of the NYC-based literary and culture tabloid The Brooklyn Rail.

== Life and career ==
Maggio was born in Buffalo, New York. He graduated with a BA from Rutgers University.

Maggio's debut feature film, Virgil Bliss (2001), was nominated for two Independent Spirit Awards, including The John Cassavetes Award. His second film, Milk and Honey (2003), premiered at the Sundance Film Festival and won a Special Jury Prize for Best Screenplay at the Atlanta Film Festival in 2003. His third film, Paper Covers Rock (IFC Films), premiered at South by Southwest in 2008.

In 2010, Maggio's film, Bitter Feast, premiered at the Los Angeles Film Festival. In 2011, his film, The Last Rites of Joe May, premiered at the Tribeca Film Festival and also nominated for Best Narrative Feature at the Tribeca Film Festival. His sixth feature film, Supermoto, premiered at the Minneapolis–Saint Paul International Film Festival.

Maggio has collaborated with Vincent D'Onofrio on three radio plays, Man on the Ledge (2010), Ram King (2013), and Cannibals (2015), as part of the series Tales from Beyond the Pale, hosted by Larry Fessenden. He is currently working on a feature documentary, Gary from Omaha, about one man's hunt for a mythical creature in the wilds of Oregon's Blue Mountains.

In 2020, Maggio joined the faculty of Emerson College where he teaches in the Visual Media Arts (VMA) Department. He is currently in post-production on the feature film Bliss (2023), which is the second installment of his Virgil Bliss trilogy.

== Filmography ==
Year	Film	Director	Writer	Producer	Note
2001	Virgil Bliss	Yes	Yes	Yes	Feature film
2003	Milk and Honey	Yes	Yes		Feature film
2005	Caesar Eats a Mouse	Yes			Short film
2008	Paper Covers Rock	Yes	Yes	Yes	Feature film
2010	Bitter Feast	Yes	Yes		Feature film
2011	The Last Rites of Joe May	Yes	Yes		Feature film
2016	Supermoto	Yes	Yes	Yes	Feature film
2020	Acting Adam		Yes		Documentary
2023	Bliss	Yes	Yes		Feature film
