= Anna D. Shapiro =

American theatre director

- Born: Anna Davida Shapiro; March 10, 1966 (age 60); Evanston, Illinois, U.S.
- Education: Columbia College, Chicago (BA); Yale University (MFA)
- Spouse: Ian Barford
- Children: 2

Anna Davida Shapiro (born March 10, 1966) is an American theater director, was the artistic director of the Steppenwolf Theater Company, and a professor at Northwestern University. Throughout her career, she has directed both the Steppenwolf Theater Company production of August: Osage County (2007) along with its Broadway debut (2008-2009), the Broadway debuts of The Motherfucker with the Hat (2011) and Fish in the Dark (2014), The Minutes (2022), Eureka Day (2024) and Broadway revivals of This Is Our Youth and Of Mice and Men, both in 2014. She won the Tony Award for Best Direction of a Play for her direction of August: Osage County.

== Early years ==
Shapiro was born in Evanston, Illinois, the youngest of four children. She attended Evanston Township High School and graduated in 1983. She later went on to receive a Bachelor of Arts in theater direction from Columbia College Chicago in 1990. She then attended graduate school and received a Master of Fine Arts at the Yale School of Drama, and was the recipient of a 1996 Princess Grace Award.

== Career ==
Her credits include the premieres of Until We Find Each Other, The Pain and the Itch, Purple Heart, Three Days of Rain, Drawer Boy, I Never Sang for my Father, A Fair Country, Iron and Man from Nebraska. She also directed Edwin Sanchez's Trafficking in Broken Hearts for the Atlantic Theater Company. She directed the world premieres of The Ordinary Yearning of Miriam Buddwing by Alexandra Gersten-Vassilaros at Steppenwolf in 2001, and Bruce Norris's The Infidel at both Steppenwolf and the Philadelphia Theatre Company.

After directing Tracy Letts' August: Osage County at Steppenwolf and winning the Jefferson Award for Best Director, she directed the play on Broadway, with all but two of the original cast, and won the 2008 Tony Award for Best Director of a Play, as well as the Drama Desk Award and the Outer Critics Circle Award for Outstanding Director of a Play. August: Osage County was named by Time magazine as its number one theater production for 2007.

On Broadway, Shapiro also directed Of Mice and Men and This Is Our Youth (2014). She directed the Larry David play, Fish in the Dark on Broadway at the Cort Theatre, which opened in February 2015.

Shapiro has been on the faculty of Northwestern University as head of the Graduate Directing Program in Theatre since 2002. She has been affiliated with Steppenwolf Theatre since 1995, serving as the original director of the New Plays Lab and later joining the artistic staff as resident director. Shapiro is an artistic associate and became a member of the ensemble in 2005. She was named the artistic director of Steppenwolf in September 2015.

In the Fall of 2024, Shapiro directed Eureka Day by Jonathan Spector on Broadway at the Samuel J. Friedman Theatre, as part of Manhattan Theatre Club's 2024–2025 season.

== Personal life ==
She is married to actor Ian Barford, and they have two children. She also has 6 nephews and nieces.

== Stage credits ==
Year	Title	Role	Venue	Ref.
1996	The Viewing Room	Director	Regional, Steppenwolf Theatre Company	
1998	Wolf Lullaby	Director	Regional, Steppenwolf Theatre Company	
1999	Three Days Of Rain	Director	Regional, Steppenwolf Theatre Company	
1999	Side Man	Director	Regional, Steppenwolf Theatre Company	
2000	The Infidel	Director	Regional, Steppenwolf Theatre Company	
2007	August: Osage County	Director	Broadway, Imperial Theatre	
2011	The Motherfucker with the Hat	Director	Broadway, Gerald Schoenfeld Theatre	
2013	Domesticated	Director	Off-Broadway, Lincoln Center Theatre	
2014	Of Mice and Men	Director	Broadway, Longacre Theatre	
2014	This Is Our Youth	Director	Broadway, Cort Theatre	
2015	Fish in the Dark	Director	Broadway, Cort Theatre	
2018	Straight White Men	Director	Broadway, Hayes Theatre	
2019	Linda Vista	Director	Broadway, Hayes Theatre	
2021	Pass Over	Director	Broadway, August Wilson Theatre	
2022	The Minutes	Director	Broadway, Studio 54	
2024	Eureka Day	Director	Broadway, Samuel J. Friedman Theatre	
2027	Three Days of Rain	Director	Broadway	

== Awards and nominations ==
Year	Award	Category	Work	Result	Ref.
2008	Outer Critics Circle Award	Outstanding Director of a Play	August: Osage County	Won	
2008	Drama Desk Award	Outstanding Director of a Play	August: Osage County	Won	
2008	Tony Award	Best Direction of a Play	August: Osage County	Won	
2011	Tony Award	Best Direction of a Play	The Motherfucker with the Hat	Nominated	
2011	Outer Critics Circle Award	Outstanding Director of a Play	The Motherfucker with the Hat	Nominated	
2014	Drama Desk Award	Outstanding Director of a Play	Domesticated	Won	
2022	Tony Award	Best Play	The Minutes	Nominated	
2022	Outer Critics Circle Award	Outstanding Director of a Play	The Minutes	Nominated	
2025	Drama League Award	Outstanding Direction of a Play	Eureka Day	Nominated	
