= Howard Starks =

American poet

Howard Vernon Starks (December 7, 1929 – April 7, 2003) was an American poet from the U.S. state of Oklahoma. He is best known for his poem, "August: Osage County," which was one of the inspirations for Tracy Letts' Pulitzer Prize-winning play of the same name.

== Early life ==
Starks was born December 7, 1929, in Shidler, Oklahoma. He graduated high school in Fittstown, Oklahoma and served in the U.S. Army before earning a bachelor's degree in education from East Central State College in Ada, Oklahoma. He began a career in education with two years in the Fox and Healdton, Oklahoma public schools before entering the University of Oklahoma graduate school. He taught as a graduate assistant in English before teaching at University of Nevada, Reno and University of Colorado Boulder.

== Higher education career ==
In 1968 he came to Southeastern Oklahoma State University in Durant and remained until his retirement in 1995. He taught courses in humanities, mythology, modern poetry, and numerous branches of literature. He was very active in theater and drama at SOSU as a performer, director, costume designer and drama coach, and in 2002 he received the Distinguished Faculty Award from Southeastern State Oklahoma University for his meritorious service and accomplishments.

== Poetry ==
After his retirement in 1995 he completed his first book of poetry, Family Album (A Collection of Poetry) for Running Board Press. It was a finalist in the 1997 Oklahoma Book Awards.

The collection contained fifteen poems, but one poem from the book, "August: Osage County," has achieved both national and international prominence because of Tracy Letts' play of the same name. Letts' drama won the Pulitzer Prize and the Tony Award for best play of 2008.

"I could never come up with a title as brilliant as 'August: Osage County.' Mr. Howard Starks, gentleman, teacher, poet, genius, mentor, friend, created that title for an extraordinary poem that is one of the inspirations for my play. I steal the title with deference, yet without apology — Howard, I'm sure, would have it no other way — and I dedicate this play to his memory."

After his death a tribute to Starks was part of Southeastern's year-long commemoration of the university's centennial.
