= The Minutes (play) =

2017 play written by Tracy Letts

- Promotional poster for the Steppenwolf production
- Original language: English
- Written by: Tracy Letts
- Genre: Comedy
- Setting: A city council meeting room in Big Cherry; November

Premiere
- Date: November 9, 2017
- Place: Steppenwolf Theatre, Chicago

The Minutes is a comedic play written by Tracy Letts. It had its premiere at the Steppenwolf Theater in Chicago on November 9, 2017, and began previews at the James Earl Jones Theatre in New York City on February 25, 2020. It was scheduled to open on March 15, 2020, but due to the COVID-19 pandemic, production was suspended. The production ultimately opened on April 17, 2022, at Studio 54.

In 2018, Letts was nominated for the Pulitzer Prize for Drama, losing to Cost of Living by Martyna Majok. The play was also nominated for the 2022 Tony Award for Best Play, but lost to The Lehman Trilogy.

== Premise ==
The show takes place in November and shows the inner-workings of a city council meeting in the fictional town of Big Cherry.

== Production history ==
=== Chicago premiere ===
The play premiered at the Steppenwolf Theatre in Chicago on November 9, 2017. The production was directed by Anna D. Shapiro and featured a cast made up of Ian Barford, Penny Slusher, Kevin Anderson, James Vincent Meredith, Cliff Chamberlain, William Petersen, Danny McCarthy, Brittany Burch, Francis Guinan, Sally Murphy, and Jeff Still. It featured design work from David Zinn (scenic), Ana Kuzmanic (costume), and Brian MacDevitt (lighting), André Pluess (sound), and Tom Watson (hair and wigs). The production closed on December 31, 2017, with plans to transfer the production to New York City.

=== 2022 Broadway production ===
The production transferred to the James Earl Jones Theatre and began previews on February 20, 2020. The design team and several members of the cast from the Chicago production signed on, though Slusher was replaced with Blair Brown, Chamberlain assumed Anderson's role and was replaced with Armie Hammer, Meredith was replaced with K. Todd Freeman, Petersen was replaced with Tracy Letts (also the playwright), Burch was replaced with Jessie Mueller, and Guinan was replaced with Austin Pendleton. The production planned to officially open on March 15, 2020, but, due to the COVID-19 pandemic, production was suspended indefinitely.

On November 16, 2020, the production unloaded from the James Earl Jones and announced that it would be moving to a different Broadway theater, with initial plans to open on March 15, 2022. In June 2021, it was reported that The Minutes would resume performances at Studio 54. It began previews on April 2, 2022, and officially opened on April 17. The entire cast from the 2020 previews returned except for Hammer, who was replaced by Noah Reid. The production closed on July 24, 2022.

== Notable casts ==
Character	Chicago 2017	Broadway 2022
Mr. Carp	Ian Barford	Ian Barford
Ms. Innes	Penny Slusher	Blair Brown
Mr. Breeding	Kevin Anderson	Cliff Chamberlain
Mr. Blake	James Vincent Meredith	K. Todd Freeman
Mr. Peel	Cliff Chamberlain	Noah Reid
Mayor Superba	William Petersen	Tracy Letts
Mr. Hanratty	Danny McCarthy	Danny McCarthy
Ms. Johnson	Brittany Burch	Jessie Mueller
Mr. Oldfield	Francis Guinan	Austin Pendleton
Ms. Matz	Sally Murphy	Sally Murphy
Mr. Assalone	Jeff Still	Jeff Still

== Awards and nominations ==
=== Original Chicago production ===
Year	Award	Category	Nominee(s)	Result	Ref.
2018	The Pulitzer Prize	Pulitzer Prize for Drama	Tracy Letts	Nominated	

=== Original Broadway production ===
Year	Award	Category	Nominee(s)	Result	Ref
2022	Drama League Award	Outstanding Production of a Play		Nominated	
2022	Tony Awards	Best Play		Nominated	
2022	Outer Critics Circle Awards	Outstanding New Broadway Play		Nominated	
2022	Outer Critics Circle Awards	Outstanding Featured Actor in a Play	Austin Pendleton	Nominated	
2022	Outer Critics Circle Awards	Outstanding Director of a Play	Anna D. Shapiro	Nominated	
2022	Outer Critics Circle Awards	Outstanding Scenic Design	David Zinn	Nominated	
2022	Outer Critics Circle Awards	Outstanding Lighting Design	Brian MacDevitt	Nominated	
2022	Outer Critics Circle Awards	Outstanding Sound Design	André Pluess	Nominated	
