= August: Osage County =

2007 play by Tracy Letts

- Original Broadway windowcard
- Original language: English
- Written by: Tracy Letts
- Characters: Beverly Weston; Violet Weston; Barbara Fordham; Ivy Weston; Karen Weston; Bill Fordham; Jean Fordham; Steve Heidebrecht; Mattie Fae Aiken; Charlie Aiken; Little Charles; Johnna Monevata; Sheriff Deon Gilbeau
- Subject: A family is forced to confront its past and present.
- Genre: Tragicomedy
- Setting: A large country home outside Pawhuska, Oklahoma

Premiere
- Date: June 28, 2007
- Place: Steppenwolf Theatre Company; Chicago, Illinois

August: Osage (Note: /oʊˈseɪdʒ/) County is a tragicomedy play by Tracy Letts. It was the recipient of the 2008 Pulitzer Prize for Drama. The play premiered at the Steppenwolf Theatre in Chicago on June 28, 2007, and closed on August 26, 2007. It had its Broadway debut at the Imperial Theater on December 4, 2007, and the production transferred to the Music Box Theatre on April 29, 2008. The Broadway show closed on June 28, 2009, after 648 performances and 18 previews.

The show made its UK debut at London's National Theatre in November 2008. A US national tour began on July 24, 2009, with its first performance at Denver's Buell Theatre.

In 2013, it was adapted and brought to the stage by the Greenray Theatre, a Taiwanese theater troupe. The story and characters remained unchanged, except the plot took place in a Taiwanese family.

== Plot ==
The action takes place over the course of several weeks in August inside the three-story home of Beverly and Violet Weston outside Pawhuska, Oklahoma.

=== Prologue ===
The play opens with Beverly Weston, a once-famous poet, interviewing Johnna, a young Cheyenne woman, for a position as live-in cook and caregiver for his wife Violet, who is being treated for mouth cancer due to heavy cigarette use for most of her life. Violet is a heavy drinker addicted to several different kinds of prescription drugs and exhibits paranoia and mood swings. Beverly, who freely admits that he is an alcoholic, lightly converses about Violet's current problems, most of which Beverly concedes are the result of personal demons too powerful to be cured by drugs. Violet enters the scene clearly affected by her drugs. After an incoherent and combative argument with Beverly, Violet returns upstairs. Beverly hires Johnna, lends her a book of T.S. Eliot's poetry, and continues to drink.

=== Act one ===
Several weeks later. Beverly Weston has not been seen for five days. Several family members have gathered in the house to provide support for Violet including her daughter Ivy, her sister Mattie Fae and Mattie Fae's husband Charlie. When Violet is not making calls attempting to track down her husband or popping pills, she spends the time sniping at her family, particularly Ivy, whom she criticizes for her mode of dress and lack of a romantic life. The news comes that Beverly's boat is missing, furthering the fear that he has died by suicide. Ivy's older sister Barbara arrives from Boulder, Colorado, with her husband Bill and 14-year-old daughter Jean. Barbara has not visited her mother in several years, and has mixed feelings about returning to the house because of the confrontational nature of their relationship. They fall into an argument almost immediately, during which Violet accuses her of abandoning her family and breaking her father's heart.

Later in the evening, Jean bonds with Johnna after the older woman allows her to smoke some marijuana in her room. She confides to Johnna that her parents are separated and are attempting to hide the fact from the family. Bill and Barbara argue over the cause of their separation as they make a bed out of the fold-out sofa in the living room: Bill is sleeping with a much younger woman, one of his students at the university where he teaches. At five AM, the local sheriff, Deon Gilbeau (Barbara's high school boyfriend) rings the doorbell and breaks the news that Beverly has been found drowned. Barbara goes to identify the body as Violet comes downstairs in a drug-addled fog. The act ends with her spiraling into confusion.

=== Act two ===
Several days later. The family has come from Beverly's funeral. Violet spends a quiet moment alone in Beverly's office, bitterly reproaching him for leaving her, and takes some more pills. Before the memorial dinner prepared for the family by Johnna, several family arguments and scenes arise. Ivy and Barbara's sister Karen has flown in from Florida with her new fiancé and can talk about nothing except her wedding plans, distressing Barbara. During an argument with her mother and Mattie Fae, Ivy unwittingly confesses that she is seeing someone romantically but refuses to say whom. Mattie Fae and Charlie's son Little Charles has overslept and missed the funeral. His father is sympathetic but Mattie Fae is, as usual, rude to and critical of her son. Karen's fiancé Steve discovers that Jean is a pot-smoker and offers to share his stash with her, lewdly flirting with the teenaged girl. In a private moment, it is revealed that Ivy's lover is actually Little Charles, her first cousin.

Dinner is served, and Violet begins insulting and needling all of her family members. After inappropriately discussing Beverly's will at the table, she cruelly exposes Barbara and Bill's separation. When Barbara starts to fight back, Violet tauntingly reveals the full extent of her addiction, and the tensions develop into a violent confrontation, culminating in Barbara physically attacking her mother. After family members separate them, Barbara takes control of the situation, ordering that the family raid the house to discover all of Violet's hiding places for her pills.

=== Act three ===
Several hours later things have calmed down, but the pain of the dinner confrontation has not gone away. Barbara reports that Violet's doctor thinks she has brain damage, and the three sisters share a drink in their father's study, discussing their mother. Ivy reveals that she and Little Charles are planning to run away to New York, and refuses to acknowledge the need for someone to take care of Violet. She reveals that it was Violet, not Beverly, who was heartbroken when Barbara left Oklahoma. Violet enters, now more coherent and off her drugs but no less incorrigible, is resigned to dealing with her demise on her own terms. She discusses a depressing story from her childhood with her daughters. In a private moment, Barbara and Violet apologize to each other, but it is uncertain how long the peace will last.

Mattie Fae observes a tender moment between Little Charles and Ivy, and begins taunting him again when the ever-patient Charlie finally loses his temper with his wife, berating her for her cruelty to her own son and promising her that unless she can find a way to be kind to Little Charles, he is going to leave her. The lecture is accidentally overheard by Barbara, who confirms when pressed that Little Charles and Ivy are lovers. She is shocked when Mattie Fae reveals that Little Charles is not just Ivy's first cousin but also her half-brother, the result of a long-ago affair between Mattie Fae and Beverly. Mattie Fae refuses to tell Ivy or Little Charles the truth, leaving it up to Barbara, who knows that the news will destroy Ivy, to find a way to end the incestuous affair.

Later that night, Steve and Jean share a joint, and before long, Steve attempts to molest Jean. Johnna walks in on the scene and attacks Steve with a skillet; the noise brings Jean's parents and Karen to the scene. An ugly argument follows when Jean defensively lashes out at her parents with hurtful comments about her father's affair, and Barbara slaps her. Karen leaves with Steve, choosing to lie to herself and mistakenly blaming Jean for what happened. Bill elects to return to Boulder with Jean and admits, when Barbara confronts him, that he is not going to come back to her. He leaves as Barbara tells him she loves him.

Two weeks pass. Barbara, now drinking heavily, offers Johnna a chance to quit and leave the toxic environment of the Weston house, but she chooses to stay. Sheriff Gilbeau drops by the house with the news that Beverly had stayed at a motel shortly before he died by suicide. He and Barbara nearly share a tender moment, but she is too emotionally exhausted and drunk to consummate it.

Several days later, Ivy has dinner with Barbara and Violet. Ivy attempts to tell her mother, over Barbara's objections, of her plans with Little Charles but Violet suddenly confesses that she already knows that Little Charles is Beverly's son. Ivy recoils in shock and horror, rebuffing Barbara's attempts to comfort her, and says that she will never tell him and leaves for New York anyway. Before she goes, Ivy angrily accuses Barbara of turning into Violet, stunning Barbara. Violet calmly reveals that she has deliberately destroyed Ivy and Charles' affair, which she knew of the entire time. Barbara and her mother have one last angry confrontation during which Violet blames Barbara for her father's suicide. Violet also reveals his suicide might have been preventable since she knew which motel he stayed in the night he left the house, but did nothing to help him until after she removed money from the couple's joint safe deposit box. Barbara, realizing that her mother has slipped beyond her help, leaves the house. Violet breaks down and is left only with Johnna, who ends the play with a quotation from a T.S. Eliot poem: "This is the way the world ends, this is the way the world ends."

== Characters ==
Beverly Weston
The father of the Weston family, aged 69, an alcoholic and washed-up poet. His mysterious disappearance one evening and eventually discovered death are the reasons for the family's reunion. The reasons for his implied suicide are a major plot point that bring some of the family's dark past painfully back into the light.
Violet Weston
The mother of the Weston family, aged 65. Undergoing treatment for oral cancer, she is addicted to several prescription drugs, mostly depressants and narcotics. After an ugly rant at Beverly's funeral dinner, the family's focus shifts to keeping her clean. Despite her drug-induced episodes, she is sharp-tongued and shrewd; she is aware of the family's many secrets and not hesitant to reveal them for her own benefit.
Barbara Fordham
The oldest daughter of the Weston Family, age 46. Mother of Jean and wife of Bill, though they are currently separated. She is a college professor in Boulder, Colorado. She wants to save her marriage, but has the intense need to control everything around her as it falls apart.
Ivy Weston
The middle daughter of the Weston family, age 44. The only daughter to stay in Oklahoma, she works as a librarian at the local college, and her calm and patient exterior hides a passionate woman who is gradually growing cynical. She is secretly having an affair with her "cousin", Little Charles, and plans to move to New York with him.
Karen Weston
The youngest daughter in the Weston family, age 40. She is newly engaged to Steve, whom she considers the "perfect man", and lives with him in Florida, planning to marry him soon. Karen can talk of little else but her own happiness even at her father's funeral, and she clearly chooses to lie to herself about her sleazy fiancé rather than face the reality of not getting a happy ending.
Bill Fordham
Barbara's estranged husband and Jean's father, age 49. A college professor, he has left his wife for a younger woman named Cindy, one of his students, but wants to be there for his family. His marriage is disintegrating and his patience is slowly running thin.
Jean Fordham
Bill and Barbara's smart-tongued 14-year-old daughter. She smokes pot and cigarettes, is a vegetarian, loves old movies, and is bitter about her parents' split. She has a sexual encounter with her future uncle Steve and reacts violently to Johnna coming to her rescue.
Steve Heidebrecht
Karen's fiancé, age 50. A businessman in Florida (whose business, it is hinted, centers on the Middle East and may be less than legitimate), and not the "perfect man" that Karen considers him. He is inappropriately sexual with Jean throughout the play, supplies her with marijuana, and sexually assaults her.
Mattie Fae Aiken
Violet's sister, Charlie's wife and Little Charles' mother, age 57. Just as jaded as her sister, Mattie Fae constantly belittles her son and antagonizes her husband. Eventually she reveals the major plot point that Beverly, not Charlie, is the real father of Little Charles.
Charlie Aiken
Husband of Mattie Fae and the presumed father of Little Charles, age 60. Charlie, a genial man, was a lifelong friend of Beverly. He struggles to get Mattie Fae to respect Little Charles.
"Little" Charles Aiken
Son of Mattie Fae and Beverly, 37 years old—but, like everyone else, he believes Charlie is his father. He is unemployed and clumsy, and his mother calls him a "screw-up", which may be a self-fulfilling prophecy. He is secretly having an affair with Ivy, who is revealed to actually be his half-sister.
Johnna Monevata
A Cheyenne Indian woman, age 26, whom Beverly hires as a live-in housekeeper shortly before he disappears. Violet is prejudiced against her, but she wins over the other family members with her cooking skills, hard work, and empathy. Johnna is the silent witness to much of the mayhem in the house.
Sheriff Deon Gilbeau
A high-school classmate and former boyfriend of Barbara's, age 47, who brings the news of Beverly's suicide to the family.

== Productions ==
The show was originally produced on August 12, 2007, by the Steppenwolf Theatre Company at the Downstairs Theatre in Chicago. The Broadway production began previews on October 30, 2007, at the Imperial Theatre only days before the 2007 Broadway stagehand strike on November 10, which temporarily closed most shows. The strike continued through the official opening date of November 20, forcing the show to reschedule its December 4 opening. The Broadway production closed on June 28, 2009, after 648 performances and 18 previews. The Broadway debut used much of cast from Steppenwolf in Chicago, and opened to receive wide acclaim. The production, originally slated to close on February 17, 2008, was extended for three weeks to March 9 after the strike, and later extended to April 13, 2008, when it was subsequently given an open-ended commercial run.

Both the Steppenwolf and Broadway productions were directed by Anna D. Shapiro, featuring scenic design by Todd Rosenthal, costume design by Ana Kuzmanic, lighting design by Ann G. Wrightson, sound design by Richard Woodbury, original music by David Singer, dramaturgy by Edward Sobel, dialect coaching by Cecille O'Reilly, and fight choreography by Charles Coyl. Both productions were stage managed by Deb Styer, with Jane Grey joining the New York company. August: Osage County made its UK debut at London's National Theatre in November 2008. Additionally, a US National Tour was launched at Denver's Ellie Caulkins Opera House on July 24, 2009, with Estelle Parsons portraying the role of Violet. This production went on to tour throughout the country. The play made its Israeli debut at Habima Theatre in Tel Aviv in January 2009 starring Gila Almagor. The play made its Puerto Rican debut at the Rene Marquez Theater Hall of the Luis A. Ferre Performing Arts Center in San Juan in March 2009 starring Gladys Rodríguez.

The Melbourne Theatre Company mounted a production in Australia at the Arts Centre Playhouse starring Robyn Nevin, from 23 May to June 27, 2009. The New Theatre opened its production in Newton, NSW on June 8, 2018, with Louise Fischer directing and with Alice Livingston as Violet. The large cast engaged the audience for 3 hours and 10 minutes with 2 intervals. The tri-level house was successfully created with staircases mezaninnes by Ester Roseberg, Tom Bannerman and Rodger Wishart. Emilia Stubbs Grigoriou was Johnna who has reverted to her Cheyenne name and is given a few seconds of attention to explain the significance of the Turtle Pouch she wears around her neck.

The play had its German premiere in Mannheim at the Nationaltheater on October 31, 2008, under the title "Eine Familie" ("A family"), directed by Burkhard C. Kosminski. The Austrian premiere in Vienna, in the Akademietheater from October 31, 2009, onwards was staged by the Latvian director Alvis Hermanis and featured Kirsten Dene in the role of Violet Weston. The play has been translated into Spanish and premiered in Buenos Aires at the Teatro Lola Membrives, starring Norma Aleandro and Mercedes Morán. It ran there for more than a year, with frequent sold-out houses. The play made its Swedish debut at Gothenburg City Theatre. Opening Night on January 29, 2010, starring Ann Petrén, and its Danish at the Betty Nansen Theatre in Copenhagen. It was due to premiere in Montevideo by mid-2010, at the Teatro El Galpón. August premiered on April 29, 2010, in Lima, at the Teatro La Plaza – Isil, starring Claudia Dammert. The Catalan play premiered on November 25, 2010, in the Catalan National Theatre (Teatre Nacional de Catalunya, Barcelona) with great success. It was renewed for another season during 2012. The cast included Anna Lizaran as Violet and Emma Vilarasau as Barbara. The Steppenwolf Theatre Company opened a production in Sydney in conjunction with the Sydney Theatre Company in August 2010.

The amateur debut of the play was made by Hingham High School in Hingham, Massachusetts, on May 4, 2012, and was followed by a production at the Hawken School Hawken Players Society production on November 7–10, 2013. The Auckland Theatre Company staged the New Zealand premiere of the play in September 2010, starring Jennifer Ward-Lealand, Stuart Devenie and Nancy Brunning and directed by Colin McColl. The Wellington production opened at Circa Theatre on April 1, 2011, with Jennifer Ludlam reprising the role of Violet. In April 2014, the play premiered in Romania, at the Iași National Theatre. The play had its U.S. regional premiere on September 9, 2010, in Albuquerque, New Mexico with Fusion Theatre Company. According to the company's website, performances for this production completely sold out. The cast included professional and Tony-nominated actors such as Laurie Thomas and Joanne Camp, and was directed by Gil Lazier.

The play had its university premiere on September 23, 2010, in a unique co-production undertaken by Wright State University's Department of Theatre, Dance and Motion Pictures and The Human Race Theatre Company of Dayton, Ohio. The production was the first co-production of its kind for this play, combining seven professional actors with six students (EMC candidates) in WSU's BFA Acting program, and played to over four thousand during its three-week run in the Robert and Elaine Stein Auditorium on the Wright State campus. This production featured Susanne Marley as Violet Weston, the role she had played in the Broadway production, and Rainbow Dickerson, also from the Broadway production, as well as six students from the WSU undergraduate theatre program.

The play has its Dutch premiere on May 1, 2011, at the Stadsschouwburg Utrecht (Utrecht City Theatre) by theatre company De Utrechtse Spelen. It was directed by Antoine Uitdehaag and starred Tjitske Reidinga, Peter Blok, Ria Eimers and Tom de Ket. The Dutch title is Augustus: Oklahoma. Other 2011 productions included Florida Repertory Theatre Company of Fort Myers in March; the Oregon Shakespeare Festival in April; National Taiwan University in May, as the 2011 Graduation Production of the Department of Foreign Languages and Literatures; the Carolina Actors Studio Theatre of Charlotte in August; and its college premiere at Western Illinois University on April 20, 2011. Due to a serious fall during its final week of rehearsal, the director had to step in for the lead and perform the role of Violet Weston.

The Spanish version (Agosto (condado de Osage)) of the play opened on December 7, 2011, in Madrid, with an all-star-cast including Amparo Baró as Violet, Carmen Machi as Barbara, Alicia Borrachero as Ivy, Clara Sanchis as Karen, Sonsoles Benedicto as Mattie-Fae and Irene Escolar as Jean among many others, directed by Gerardo Vera. The show closed on February 22, 2012, after a huge success.

In India, veteran theatre actor and director Lillete Dubey has directed a slightly adapted version of the play and has been touring with it in several Indian cities such as Delhi, Mumbai and Bangalore. In the Indian version, while the name of the play and those of most characters remain the same, the narrative has been shifted to the Indian state of Goa. Many well-known Indian theatre and film actors have major roles in the play, with Dubey herself playing the role of Violet with Sandhya Mridul as Barbara, Kitu Gidwani as Mattie, Mita Vashisht as Karen and Suchitra Pillai as Ivy.

The Polish adaptation of the play, titled "Sierpień" (meaning "August"), had its premiere in Teatr Studio in Warsaw on February 2, 2012. Imperium Theater in Leiden, The Netherlands, was the first amateur theater company outside the United States to perform the play, on May 12, 2012. The PACE (Performing Arts Curriculum Experience) program at Mamaroneck High School opened their 2013 season with August: Osage County on October 23, 2013. The Fox Network's cartoon comedy series American Dad did an over the top, metaphor-festooned satirical send up of the play's style as well as Clifford Odets' Paradise Lost, called "Blood Crieth Unto Heaven." The UMass Theatre Guild of University of Massachusetts Amherst premiered an entirely student-run production of August: Osage County on April 9, 2015.

== Cast & characters ==
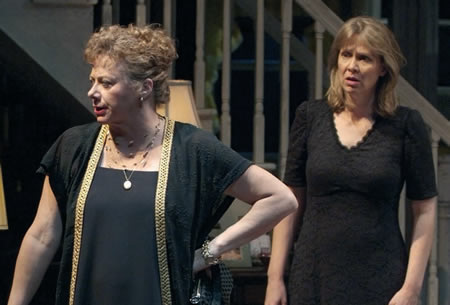
Steppenwolf Theatre ensemble members Rondi Reed (left) and Amy Morton in the original Chicago cast of August: Osage County.

Character	Chicago	Broadway	London	National Tour
Character	2007		2008	2009
Little Charles	Ian Barford	Ian Barford	Ian Barford	Stephen Riley Key
Violet Weston	Deanna Dunagan	Deanna Dunagan	Deanna Dunagan	Estelle Parsons
Johnna Moevata	Kimberly Guerrero	Kimberly Guerrero	Kimberly Guerrero	DeLanna Studi
Charlie Aiken	Francis Guinan	Francis Guinan	Paul Vincent O'Connor	Paul Vincent O'Connor
Steve Heidebrecht	Rick Snyder	Brian Kerwin	Gary Cole	Laurence Lau
Beverly Weston	Dennis Letts	Dennis Letts	Chelcie Ross	Jon DeVries
Jean Fordham	Fawn Johnstin	Madeleine Martin	Molly Ranson	Emily Kinney
Karen Weston	Mariann Mayberry	Mariann Mayberry	Mariann Mayberry	Amy Warren
Barbara Fordham	Amy Morton	Amy Morton	Amy Morton	Shannon Cochran
Ivy Weston	Sally Murphy	Sally Murphy	Sally Murphy	Angelica Torn
Bill Fordham	Jeff Perry	Jeff Perry	Jeff Perry	Jeff Still
Mattie Fae Aiken	Rondi Reed	Rondi Reed	Rondi Reed	Libby George
Sheriff Deon Gilbeau	Troy West	Troy West	Troy West	Marcus Nelson

=== Notable Cast Replacements ===
==== Broadway (2007-2009) ====
- Violet Westin: Estelle Parsons, Phylicia Rashad
- Charlie Aiken: Robert Foxworth
- Beverly Weston: John Cullum, Michael McGuire
- Jean Fordham: Molly Ranson
- Barbara Fordham: Johanna Day
- Bill Fordham: Frank Wood
- Mattie Fae Aiken: Elizabeth Ashley

== Awards and nominations ==
=== 2007 Chicago production ===
Year	Award	Category	Nominee	Result
2007	Jeff Award	Best Production – Play		Won
2007	Jeff Award	Best Director – Play	Anna D. Shapiro	Won
2007	Jeff Award	Best Ensemble		Won
2007	Jeff Award	Best Actress in a Principal Role – Play	Deanna Dunagan	Won
2007	Jeff Award	Best Actress in a Principal Role – Play	Amy Morton	Nominated
2007	Jeff Award	Best New Work – Play	Tracy Letts	Won
2007	Jeff Award	Best Scenic Design	Todd Rosenthal	Won

=== Original Broadway production ===
Year	Award	Category	Nominee	Result
2008	Tony Award	Best Play		Won
2008	Tony Award	Best Direction of a Play	Anna D. Shapiro	Won
2008	Tony Award	Best Actress in a Play	Deanna Dunagan	Won
2008	Tony Award	Best Actress in a Play	Amy Morton	Nominated
2008	Tony Award	Best Featured Actress in a Play	Rondi Reed	Won
2008	Tony Award	Best Scenic Design of a Play	Todd Rosenthal	Won
2008	Tony Award	Best Lighting Design of a Play	Ann G. Wrightson	Nominated
2008	Drama Desk Award	Outstanding Play		Won
2008	Drama Desk Award	Outstanding Actress in a Play	Deanna Dunagan	Won
2008	Drama Desk Award	Outstanding Actress in a Play	Amy Morton	Nominated
2008	Drama Desk Award	Outstanding Featured Actor in a Play	Jeff Perry	Nominated
2008	Drama Desk Award	Outstanding Featured Actress in a Play	Rondi Reed	Nominated
2008	Drama Desk Award	Outstanding Director of a Play	Anna D. Shapiro	Won
2008	Drama Desk Award	Outstanding Costume Design	Ana Kuzmanic	Nominated
2008	Drama League Award	Distinguished Production of a Play		Won
2008	Outer Critics Circle Award	Outstanding Broadway Play		Won
2008	Outer Critics Circle Award	Outstanding Director of a Play	Anna D. Shapiro	Won
2008	Outer Critics Circle Award	Outstanding Actress in a Play	Deanna Dunagan	Won
2008	New York Drama Critics' Circle Award	Best Play	Tracy Letts	Won
2008	Theatre World Award		Deanna Dunagan	Won
2008	Pulitzer Prize for Drama		Tracy Letts	Won

=== 2008-2009 West End Production ===
Year	Award	Category	Nominee	Result
2008	Critics' Circle Theatre Award	Best New Play	Tracy Letts	Won
2009	Laurence Olivier Awards	Best New Play	Tracy Letts	Nominated
2009	Laurence Olivier Awards	Best Actress	Deanna Dunagan	Nominated
2009	Laurence Olivier Awards	Best Company Performance	Royal National Theatre	Nominated
2009	Laurence Olivier Awards	Best Set Design	Todd Rosenthal	Won
2009	Evening Standard Theatre Awards	Best Play	Tracy Letts	Nominated
2009	Evening Standard Theatre Awards	Best Director	Anna D Shapiro	Nominated
2009	Evening Standard Theatre Awards	Best Actress	Deanna Dunagan	Nominated
2009	Evening Standard Theatre Awards	Best Actress	Amy Morton	Nominated
2009	Evening Standard Theatre Awards	Best Set Design	Todd Rosenthal	Nominated
2009	WhatsOnStage Awards	Best New Play	August: Osage County	Nominated
2009	WhatsOnStage Awards	Best Ensemble Performance	August: Osage County	Nominated
2009	WhatsOnStage Awards	Best Actress in a Play	Deanna Dunagan	Nominated

- In 2009, Entertainment Weekly put it on its end-of-the-decade, "best-of" list, saying, "Even with a run time of three and a half hours, Tracy Letts' 2007 drama of Southern-fried familial dysfunction went by in one lightning-fast jolt of pure theatrical electricity."

== Origins of the play's name ==
The play is named after a poem written by Howard Starks. Of this, Tracy Letts has stated,

"I could never come up with a title as brilliant as 'August: Osage County.' Mr. Howard Starks, gentleman, teacher, poet, genius, mentor, friend, created that title for an extraordinary poem that is one of the inspirations for my play. I steal the title with deference, yet without apology – Howard, I'm sure, would have it no other way – and I dedicate this play to his memory."
