= Three Days of Rain =

Play by Richard Greenberg

- 2006 Broadway production playbill
- Original language: English
- Written by: Richard Greenberg
- Characters: 2 male, 1 female
- Genre: Drama
- Setting: Manhattan, New York, US

Premiere
- Date: 1997
- Place: South Coast Repertory; Costa Mesa, California

Three Days of Rain is a play by Richard Greenberg that was commissioned and produced by South Coast Repertory in 1997. The title comes from a line from W. S. Merwin's poem, "For the Anniversary of My Death" (1967). The play has often been called Stoppardian but Greenberg says he wasn't aware of Stoppard's work before he wrote the play and instead claims 1967 BBC series The Forsyte Saga was a much greater influence. Three Days of Rain was nominated for the 1998 Pulitzer Prize for Drama.

== Plot ==
=== Act One ===
Walker and his sister Nan met in an unoccupied studio in lower Manhattan in 1995. Walker, who had disappeared the day after his father's funeral, now months later is living in this apartment where his father, Ned Janeway and business partner, Theo Wexler, once lived and worked designing the famous "Janeway House". Walker has found their father's journal and attempts to use it to understand the relationship between Ned and Theo. Nan and Walker's childhood friend Pip (Theo's son) meets with them after the reading of Ned's Will, where the three have learned that Janeway House was left to Pip rather than Ned's children. Walker is furious and accuses Pip of "working on" Ned to bequeath him the house. Pip denies this and protests that he does not understand why the house was not left to Nan and Walker as next of kin. Pip reveals that he doesn't even like the house, which prompts another tirade in Walker. Fed up with Walker's ranting, Pip fights back at Walker verbally. Pip accuses Walker of secretly being in love with him for 18 years and reveals that he (Pip) and Nan were secretly sleeping with one another (behind Walker's back) when they were young. Walker runs off into the night. Pip says he may have gone too far and agrees with Nan to sell Walker the house. Nan tries to find Walker to tell him. Distraught when unable to find him, Nan decides to stay at the studio until he returns. After Walker returns, Nan apologizes and the two of them continue to parse Ned's concise and mysterious journal which opens with the entry: "1960, April 3–5. Three days of rain". Walker believes he's found a confession from Ned, hidden within the pages of the book, to the effect that Ned took credit for Theo's work on the house after Theo's death in 1966. Nan does not accept this interpretation but acquiesces to calm her brother. She tells Walker that Pip would sell him the house, but Walker's new-found "revelation" changes his mind about wanting it. Walker burns the diary, much to Nan's chagrin.

=== Act Two ===
Act two is set in April 1960, when Janeway House was designed. The same three actors portray members of the previous generation in the same apartment: the actor portraying Walker plays Ned; the actor portraying Pip plays Theo; and the actor portraying Nan plays Lina, Nan and Walker's mother. The assumptions their children made in the first half are shown to be wildly inaccurate. Rather than a callous, silent patriarch, Ned is a shy stutterer, who, while an immensely talented architect, has trouble making eye contact or holding a conversation with anyone. Theo is revealed to be charismatic, more concerned with fame and the idea of art, than the creation of any original art itself. Lina, a bohemian southern belle, is dating Theo and their arguments are loud enough for the entire neighborhood to hear. Theo and Ned attempt to design a house commissioned by Ned's parents, but Ned recognizes Theo's design as plagiarizing an existing house. Ned and Theo fight, and Theo leaves for a few days to try to work in solitude.

A few days later, Ned runs into Lina during a rainstorm, and they return to the apartment to escape the downpour. Ned invites Lina to stay for dinner, which leads each to reveal issues plaguing them. Lina resolves to leave before succumbing to Ned's unintentional shy sweetness, only to overhear Ned practicing telling Lina that he secretly loves her. Lina confronts Ned, and they spend three days in bed. Theo returns earlier than expected from his work retreat, finding Ned and Lina together in the apartment. He is embarrassed and leaves, with Ned trailing him. Ned attempts to apologize, but learns Theo is upset not about Lina but about failing to return with an original design. Lina persuades Ned that Theo will be okay, and that Ned should apply his emotions to draw the house she knows he imagines. He sits down to draw, suggesting that it was he who designed Janeway House and not Theo, as Walker had concluded.

== Characters ==
Walker/Ned Walker: A quirky and unstable young man, haunted by what he sees as a destructive and unloving relationship with his parents. He has a habit of disappearing suddenly in order to avoid dealing with real life. Ned: Walker and Nan's father who, despite his son's depiction of him as cold and uncaring, was in his youth a stuttering, shy, and talented architect.

Pip/Theo Pip: A naïve TV actor and family friend of the Janeways. Handsome, and not as dumb as he looks, he is constantly frustrated by others taking their lives so seriously, and can't fathom why people see the need to incite drama. Theo: Pip's father and Ned's business partner. A very charismatic man who is more interested in fame and the accolades that come with it than creating the art that would earn it.

Nan/Lina Nan: A practical, kind woman. Caring about her family and friends, she finds it difficult to balance her frustration at her brother Walker's craziness and Pip's naiveté. Lina: Nan and Walker's mother. A southern belle, easily changeable and tempestuous, beginning to show some of the signposts of mental instability.

== Productions ==
Three Days of Rain premiered at the South Coast Repertory Second Stage, Costa Mesa, California in March 1997. The director was Evan Yionoulis, with the cast that featured John Slattery (Walker/Ned), Patricia Clarkson (Nan/Lina), Jon Tenney (Pip/Theo), and Julia Pearlstein.

=== New York premiere ===
The play received its Off-Broadway premiere at the Manhattan Theatre Club, at City Center Stage II, running from November 12, 1997, to January 4, 1998. Directed by Evan Yionoulis the cast featured Patricia Clarkson, John Slattery and Bradley Whitford. The play won the 1998 Obie Award, Direction, and was 1998 Drama Critics' Circle Award Runner-Up, Best American Play.

The play was a finalist for the 1998 Pulitzer Prize for Drama.

The play has enjoyed many subsequent productions in regional theatres across the United States and abroad.

=== UK premiere ===
It received its British premiere in 1999 at the Donmar Warehouse with Colin Firth, David Morrissey and Elizabeth McGovern.

=== Steppenwolf ===
The Steppenwolf Theater Company produced the play opening February 11, 1999. It starred Tracy Letts, Amy Morton and Ian Barford and was directed by Anna D. Shapiro. The Chicago Tribune review states that "In Three Days of Rain, Greenberg has constructed an almost perfect showcase for his considerable talents, and Steppenwolf has responded with a director, Anna D. Shapiro, and a cast – Tracy Letts, Amy Morton and Ian Barford – that gives his script a lovely, burnished glow in performance."

=== Broadway ===
Opening in April 2006 at the Bernard B. Jacobs Theatre, Julia Roberts, in her stage debut, co-starred with Paul Rudd and Bradley Cooper. Ben Brantley, The New York Times reviewer wrote: "And though Ms. Roberts gives a genuinely humble performance, there is no way that this show is not going to be all about Julia." Although it may have been the most eagerly awaited show of the Broadway season in the popular press, it met with poor response from theatrical reviewers and closed as scheduled in June 2006. The New York Times reviewer summed up the experience: "Some movie fans may have the same fear about seeing Ms. Roberts in the flesh. They shouldn't. She looks every inch the magnetic (if theatrically challenged) movie star. Fans of Mr. Greenberg, on the other hand, should definitely stay home."

A revival is planned to open at the Longacre Theatre in February 2027, starring David Corenswet as Walker/Ned, François Arnaud as Pip/Theo and Yvonne Strahovski as Nan/Lina.

=== West End ===
A production of Three Days Of Rain, directed by Jamie Lloyd played at the Apollo Theatre in London from February to May 2009, starring James McAvoy as Walker/Ned, Nigel Harman as Pip/Theo and Lyndsey Marshal as Nan/Lina. The play was nominated for Best Revival at the 2010 Laurence Olivier Awards, as well as a nomination for Best Actor in a Play for McAvoy and Best Lighting Design.

=== The Very Little Theater ===
The Very Little Theater in Eugene, Oregon produced Three Days of Rain in April 2011. The cast consisted of Jay Hash as Walker/Ned, Sydney Behrends as Nan/Lina, and James Lee as Theo/Pip. The production was directed by Sarah Etherton.

=== South Coast Repertory ===
David Emmes was the director of the production at South Coast Repertory in Orange County, California, beginning in May 2011. It starred Kevin Rahm as Walker/Ned, Brendan Hines as Pip/Theo, and Susannah Schulman as Nan/Lina. This was the first time the play returned to South Coast Repertory since its premiere in 1997.

=== defunkt theatre ===
Three Days of Rain was produced by Portland, Oregon's defunkt theatre in 2013. Directed by Tom Moorman, starring Matthew Kern, Christy Bigelow and Spencer Conway.

=== Portland Center Stage ===
Three Days of Rain was presented at Center Stage in Portland, Oregon in May 2015, with two stars from the NBC drama Grimm in the cast: Sasha Roiz and Silas Weir Mitchell.

=== American Theatre Company ===
Three Days of Rain was produced by the American Theatre Company of Brussels in February 2020, directed by Jeremy Zeegers, and starring Ryan Eiland as Walker/Ned, Méabh Maguire as Nan/Lina, and Jimmy Finch as Pip/Theo.

== Awards and nominations ==
=== Original Off-Broadway production ===
Year	Award	Category	Nominee	Result
1998	New York Drama Critics' Circle Award	Best American Play	Richard Greenberg	Runner-up
1998	Pulitzer Prize	Drama	Richard Greenberg	Finalist
1998	Obie Award	Direction	Evan Yionoulis	Won

=== Original Broadway production ===
Year	Award	Category	Nominee	Result
2006	Drama League Award	Distinguished Revival of a Play		Nominated
2006	Tony Award	Best Scenic Design of a Play	Santo Loquasto	Nominated
2006	Tony Award	Best Lighting Design of a Play	Paul Gallo	Nominated

=== 2009 West End revival ===
Year	Award	Category	Nominee	Result
2010	Laurence Olivier Award	Best Revival		Nominated
2010	Laurence Olivier Award	Best Actor	James McAvoy	Nominated
2010	Laurence Olivier Award	Best Lighting Design	Jon Clark	Nominated
