= Rick Cluchey =

American dramatist

Douglas Charles Cluchey (December 5, 1933 – December 28, 2015) was an American actor. He was friends with Samuel Beckett.

== Life ==
Douglas Charles "Rick" Cluchey was born in Chicago in 1930. He served in the Army. In 1954 Cluchey was convicted for carjacking and armed robbery of a hotel courier for which he was sentenced to life in prison without parole. In 1957, after a touring theatre company performed Waiting for Godot for the prisoners at San Quentin, he formed his own theatre company within the prison, the Drama Workshop, and began writing and acting in plays. For his good behavior and service to the prison community, Cluchey's sentence was commuted by Pat Brown and he was released in December 1966. Following his release, he received several offers of work from theatre and film companies. In a Berlin production, he was assistant director to Samuel Beckett. He was featured in the premiere of “Krapp’s Last Tape.” He died in Santa Monica.
