= Betrayal (play) =

1978 play by Harold Pinter

- NT, poster for the 1998 production directed by Trevor Nunn.
- Original language: English
- Written by: Harold Pinter
- Characters: Emma; Jerry; Robert; Waiter
- Subject: Extramarital affair
- Genre: Drama
- Setting: London and Venice

Premiere
- Date: 15 November 1978
- Place: Lyttelton Theatre at the Royal National Theatre, London
- Official website

Betrayal is a play written by Harold Pinter in 1978. Critically regarded as one of the English playwright's major dramatic works, it features his characteristically economical dialogue, characters' hidden emotions and veiled motivations, and their self-absorbed competitive one-upmanship, face-saving, dishonesty, and (self-) deceptions.

Inspired by Pinter's clandestine extramarital affair with BBC Television presenter Joan Bakewell, which spanned seven years, from 1962 to 1969, the plot of Betrayal integrates different permutations of betrayal relating to a seven-year affair involving a married couple, Emma and Robert, and Robert's "close friend" Jerry, who is also married, to a woman named Judith. For five years, Jerry and Emma carry on their affair without Robert's knowledge, both cuckolding Robert and betraying Judith, until Emma, without telling Jerry she has done so, admits her infidelity to Robert (in effect, betraying Jerry), although she continues their affair. In 1977, four years after exposing the affair (in 1973) and two years after their subsequent break up (in 1975), Emma meets Jerry to tell him that her marriage to Robert is over. She then lies to Jerry in telling him that, "last night", she had to reveal the truth to Robert and that he now knows of the affair. The truth, however, is that Robert has known about the affair for the past four years.

Pinter's particular usage of reverse chronology in structuring the plot is innovative: the first two scenes take place after the affair has ended, in 1977; the final scene ends when the affair begins, in 1968; and, in between 1977 and 1968, scenes in two pivotal years (1977 and 1973) move forward chronologically. As Roger Ebert observes, in his review of the 1983 film, based on Pinter's own screenplay, "The Betrayal structure strips away all artifice. In this view, the play shows, heartlessly, that the very capacity for love itself is sometimes based on betraying not only other loved ones, but even ourselves." Still, drawing on the frequently commented influence of Proust's In Search of Lost Time and Pinter's work on 1977's The Proust Screenplay on Betrayal, more emotionally complex interpretations are possible based on a stress on dual motions, one forward in calendar time toward disillusion and one backward toward the redemptive recovery of time, in each work, backward particularly toward the plays conclusion with an ecstatic expression of romantic exaltation by Jerry.

== Setting ==
London and Venice, from 1968 to 1977 (in reverse chronology).

== Synopsis ==
The years between 1968 and 1977 occur in reverse order; scenes within years 1977 and 1973 move forward.

1977

- Scene One: Pub. 1977. Spring.

Emma and Jerry meet for the first time in two years. For seven years they had an affair and a secret flat, and Jerry says no one else knew. Now Emma is having an affair with Casey, an author whose agent is Jerry and whose publisher is Robert, Emma's husband. Emma says she found out last night that Robert has betrayed her with other women for years, and admits she revealed her affair with Jerry.

- Scene Two: Jerry's House. Later the same day.

Jerry meets Robert to talk about the affair. Robert reveals that in fact he learned about it four years ago. Since then their friendship has continued, albeit without playing squash.
1975

- Scene Three: Flat. 1975. Winter.

It is the end of Jerry and Emma's affair. They rarely meet, and Emma's hopes that the flat would be a different kind of home are unfulfilled. They agree to give it up.
1974

- Scene Four: Robert and Emma's House. Living room. 1974. Autumn.

Jerry visits Robert and Emma at home. He reveals that Casey has left his wife and is living nearby. Jerry and Robert plan to play squash, but Jerry reveals that first he is visiting New York with Casey.
1973

- Scene Five: Hotel Room. 1973. Summer.

Robert and Emma are on holiday, intending to visit Torcello tomorrow. Emma is reading a book by Spinks, another author whose agent is Jerry. Robert says he refused to publish it because there is not much more to say about betrayal. Robert has discovered that Emma has received a private letter from Jerry. Emma admits they are having an affair.

- Scene Six: Flat. 1973. Summer.

Emma has returned from the holiday with Robert in Venice. She has bought a tablecloth for the flat. Jerry reveals that despite the affair he continues to lunch with Robert.

- Scene Seven: Restaurant. 1973. Summer.

Robert gets drunk over lunch with Jerry. He says he hates modern novels, and that he went to Torcello on his own and read Yeats.
1971

- Scene Eight: Flat. 1971. Summer.

Emma wants to know whether Jerry's wife suspects his affair, and announces that while Jerry was in America she became pregnant with Robert's child.
1968

- Scene Nine: Robert and Emma's House. Bedroom. 1968. Winter.

During a party Jerry surprises Emma in her bedroom and declares his love for her. He tells Robert he is his oldest friend as well as his best man.

== Cast and characters ==
- Emma - Robert's wife and Jerry's lover
- Jerry - A successful literary agent in 1970s London.
- Robert - Emma's husband and Jerry's oldest friend.
- Waiter

In 1977 Emma is 38, and Jerry and Robert are 40. (n. pag. [7]).

- Notable productions

Characters	West End debut	Broadway debut	Broadway revival	Broadway revival	West End revival	Broadway revival	Goodman revival
Characters	1978	1980	2000	2013	2019	2019	2025
Emma	Penelope Wilton	Blythe Danner	Juliette Binoche	Rachel Weisz	Zawe Ashton	Zawe Ashton	Helen Hunt
Jerry	Michael Gambon	Raul Julia	Liev Schreiber	Rafe Spall	Charlie Cox	Charlie Cox	Robert Sean Leonard
Robert	Daniel Massey	Roy Scheider	John Slattery	Daniel Craig	Tom Hiddleston	Tom Hiddleston	Ian Barford
Waiter	Artro Morris	Ernesto Gasco	Mark Lotito	Stephen DeRosa	Eddie Arnold	Eddie Arnold	Nico Grelli

== Productions ==
=== England ===
Betrayal was first produced by the National Theatre in London on 15 November 1978. The original cast featured Penelope Wilton as Emma, Michael Gambon as Jerry, Daniel Massey as Robert, and Artro Morris as the waiter; Wilton and Massey were married at the time. It was designed by John Bury and directed by Peter Hall.

In 1991, Betrayal ran at the Almeida Theatre directed by David Leveaux with Bill Nighy playing Jerry, Martin Shaw playing Robert and Cheryl Campbell playing Emma.

The play was revived in the Lyttleton at the National Theatre in November 1998, directed by Trevor Nunn and starring Douglas Hodge, Imogen Stubbs, and Anthony Calf.

In 2003, Peter Hall directed a production of Betrayal at the Duchess Theatre starring Janie Dee, Aden Gillett, and Hugo Speer.

In 2007, Roger Michell staged a revival of Betrayal at the Donmar Warehouse theatre starring Toby Stephens as Jerry, Samuel West as Robert, and Dervla Kirwan as Emma. Pinter reportedly lunched with the actors, attended an early "readthrough" and provided some advice, which, according to Stephens, included the instruction to ignore some of Pinter's famous pauses (Lawson).

In 2011, a new West End production was mounted at the Comedy Theatre, directed by Ian Rickson and starring Kristin Scott Thomas, Douglas Henshall, and Ben Miles.

In 2019, Jamie Lloyd directed Tom Hiddleston as Robert, Zawe Ashton as Emma and Charlie Cox as Jerry in a revival of the play at The Harold Pinter Theatre.

Betrayal was revived at The Crucible Theatre, Sheffield – from 17 May 2012 to 9 June 2012 – as the climax of Sheffield Crucible's 40th anniversary season. It starred John Simm as Jerry, Ruth Gemmell as Emma, Colin Tierney as Robert and Thomas Tinker as the waiter. Betrayal was performed at Brighton Fringe in 2019 by Pretty Villain Productions at The Rialto Theatre, receiving a 'Highly Recommended' review and a 5* review.

=== United States ===
The American premiere took place on Broadway on 5 January 1980 at the Trafalgar Theatre, and ran for 170 performances until it closed on 31 May 1980. The show was directed by Peter Hall, was designed by John Bury, the production stage manager was Marnel Sumner, the stage manager was Ian Thomson, and press was by Seymour Krawitz and Patricia McLean Krawitz. Raul Julia starred as Jerry, Blythe Danner as Emma, Roy Scheider as Robert, Ian Thomson as the Barman, and Ernesto Gasco as the Waiter.

A 2000 Broadway revival was staged at the American Airlines Theatre with Juliette Binoche, Liev Schreiber, and John Slattery.

A 2013 revival directed by Mike Nichols, starring Daniel Craig as Robert, Rachel Weisz as his wife Emma (they were in fact married to each other), and Rafe Spall as Jerry, ran from October 2013 to January 2014 at the Ethel Barrymore Theatre, and set the Broadway record for highest weekly gross the week ending 19 December 2013. It was also the last production that Nichols would ever direct.

The 2019 West End production directed by Jamie Lloyd transferred to Broadway, once again starring Tom Hiddleston, Zawe Ashton and Charlie Cox. It ran at the Bernard B. Jacobs Theatre, with previews beginning 14 August 2019, and the official opening on 5 September 2019, closing its limited run on 8 December 2019.

A 2025 revival was staged at the Goodman Theatre in Chicago from February 8 to March 30, 2025, starring Helen Hunt, Robert Sean Leonard, and Ian Barford.

A 2025 revival with immersive visuals and music was staged at the Marilyn Monroe Theatre in Los Angeles from August 21 to August 25, 2025, starring Ainsley Bubbico, Peter Porte, and Drew Rausch. It was directed by Brendan Pollecutt and produced by Henrik P. Molin.

=== International ===
In 1980, director Bill Alexander mounted the play at the Cameri Theatre, Tel Aviv. Translator: Avraham Oz; with Oded Teomi as Jerry, Gita Munte as Emma, and Ilan Dar as Robert. In 2004, Theatre de R&D staged Betrayal's Cantonese version as the first production of this theatrical group. With the script translated to Chinese by Lucretia Ho, this production was directed by Yankov Wong, starring Lucretie Ho as Emma, Johnny Tan as Jerry, Karl Lee as Robert, and Kenneth Cheung as the Waiter. A reader's theatre format of Betrayal was produced by the Hong Kong Repertory Theatre and directed by Yankov Wong on 6 March 2010. In September 2010, theatrical group We Draman put the show on stage with a translated script by Cancer Chong, featuring renowned stage actress Alice Lau as Emma. Staged in 2007 by the Kuala Lumpur Performing Arts Centre (klpac), the play featured Bernice Chauly (Emma), Vernon Adrian Emuang (Robert), and Ari Ratos (Jerry), and was directed by filmmaker James Lee.

In 2009 Italian actor and director Andrea Renzi brought the play to life in Italy. Famed Italian actress Nicoletta Braschi stars as Emma. Tony Laudadio plays the character of Robert. Enrico Ianniello plays the part of Jerry. Nicola Marchi plays the part of a waiter. The play was very successful, and toured in Italy for over two years. It was scheduled to return again in early 2012 with the same cast. In 2013, director Ciro Zorzoli staged the play in Picadero theatre. The characters were played by Paola Krum (Emma), Daniel Hendler (Jerry), Diego Velázquez (Robert) and Gabriel Urbani (Waiter). David Berthold directed a production of Betrayal, designed by Peter England, at the Sydney Theatre Company, from 10 March through 17 April 1999; it starred Paul Goddard, Robert Menzies, and Angie Milliken. In 2015 State Theatre Company of South Australia and Melbourne Theatre Company staged a production of Betrayal directed by Geordie Brookman and starring Alison Bell. Betrayal was staged as EJA Productions' sophomore production in 2015, directed by Alexis Wong, with Amanda Ang as Emma, Dinesh Kumar as Robert, and Cheah UiHua as Jerry.

In 2017, Allnighter Productions produced a self-described "feminist" staging of the play, highlighting the oft-debated question of domestic violence in the marriage between Emma and Robert. The production starred Vinna Law (Emma), Phraveen Arikiah (Robert), and Shawn Loong (Jerry), and was directed by Asyraf Dzahiri. Also in 2017, The Actors Studio Seni Teater Rakyat staged dual-language parallel versions of the play, alternating between English and Bahasa Malaysia for each performance, while maintaining all other aspects of the production. The production(s) starred Stephanie van Driesen as Emma, Omar Ali as Robert, Razif Hashim as Jerry, and was directed by Joe Hasham.

The play was staged in 2011 in Teatro Español, with Alberto San Juan, Cecilia Solaguren and Will Keen. Adapted by Pablo Remón and directed by Israel Elejalde, it was scheduled to be staged in Madrid at the Pavón Teatro Kamikaze from 12 March 2020 to 19 April 2020. Translated by Haluk Bilginer in Turkish and for the first time in Turkey in 1990–1991 season, it was staged at Taksim Theatre as the production of Theater Studio by Ahmet Levendoğlu. It was staged by Nilüfer Sanat Theater during the 2007–2008 season. In the 2016–2017 season, it was started to be staged by the management of Ahmet Levendoğlu again at IMM City Theaters. The characters were played by Şebnem Köstem (Emma), Gökçer Genç (Jerry), Burak Davutoğlu (Robert) and Direnç Dedeoğlu (Waiter).

In 2025, a French-language version of the play, translated by Olivier Cadiot, was staged in Paris at the Théâtre de l'Œuvre with Swann Arlaud, Marie Kaufmann, and Marc Arnaud.

== Adaptations ==
Pinter adapted Betrayal as a screenplay for the 1983 film directed by David Jones, starring Jeremy Irons (Jerry), Ben Kingsley (Robert), and Patricia Hodge (Emma).

BBC Radio 4 broadcast a radio version with Andrew Scott, Charles Edwards, and Olivia Colman.

== Autobiographical inspiration ==
Betrayal was inspired by Pinter's seven-year affair with television presenter Joan Bakewell, who was married to the producer and director Michael Bakewell, while Pinter was married to actress Vivien Merchant. The affair was known in some circles; when Betrayal premiered in 1978, Lord Longford (father of Antonia Fraser), who was in the audience, commented that Emma appeared to be based on Joan Bakewell; but the affair only became public knowledge after it was confirmed by Pinter in Michael Billington's 1996 authorised biography, and further confirmed in Joan Bakewell's later memoir The Centre of the Bed. Bakewell said that the play was extremely true to life.

Pinter wrote the play while engaged in another long-running affair, this time with Antonia Fraser, which became a marriage in 1980 after he divorced Merchant. However, Pinter explained to Billington that although he wrote the play while "otherwise engaged" with Fraser, the details were based on his relationship with Bakewell.

== Cultural allusions ==
"The Betrayal" (1997), the eighth episode of season nine of the NBC television series Seinfeld, alludes overtly to Betrayal, which inspired it. Apart from the title, "The Betrayal", and the name of one-off character Pinter Ranawat who appears in the episode, the episode is structured and runs in reverse chronological order and also features love triangles as one of its central themes. According to Kent Yoder, all of these allusions were deliberate.

In 2017 a play first written by Bakewell in 1978 in response to Betrayal, entitled Keeping in Touch, was premiered on BBC Radio 4.

== Awards and nominations ==
=== Original London production ===
Year	Award	Category	Nominee	Result
1979	Laurence Olivier Award	Play of the Year	Harold Pinter	Won
1979	Laurence Olivier Award	Actor of the Year in a New Play	Michael Gambon	Nominated

=== Original Broadway production ===
Year	Award	Category	Nominee	Result
1980	Tony Award	Best Performance by a Leading Actress in a Play	Blythe Danner	Nominated
1980	Tony Award	Best Direction of a Play	Peter Hall	Nominated
1980	Drama Desk Award	Outstanding Actress In A Play	Blythe Danner	Nominated
1980	New York Drama Critics' Circle Award	Best Foreign Play	Harold Pinter	Won

=== 2000 Broadway revival ===
Year	Award	Category	Nominee	Result
2001	Tony Award	Best Revival of a Play		Nominated
2001	Tony Award	Best Performance by a Leading Actress in a Play	Juliette Binoche	Nominated
2001	Drama Desk Award	Outstanding Revival Of A Play		Nominated
2001	Drama Desk Award	Outstanding Actor In A Play	Liev Schreiber	Nominated
2001	Outer Critics Circle Award	Outstanding Actress in a Play	Juliette Binoche	Nominated
2001	Theatre World Award		Juliette Binoche	Won

=== 2011 West End revival ===
Year	Award	Category	Nominee	Result
2011	Evening Standard Theatre Award	Best Actress	Kristin Scott Thomas	Nominated
2012	Laurence Olivier Award	Best Actress	Kristin Scott Thomas	Nominated

=== 2019 West End revival ===
Year	Award	Category	Nominee	Result
2019	Evening Standard Theatre Award	Best Actor	Tom Hiddleston	Nominated
2019	Evening Standard Theatre Award	Best Director	Jamie Lloyd	Nominated
2020	Critics' Circle Theatre Award	Best Director	Jamie Lloyd	Won

=== 2019 Broadway revival ===
Year	Award	Category	Nominee	Result
2020	Tony Award	Best Revival of a Play		Nominated
2020	Tony Award	Best Performance by an Actor in a Leading Role in a Play	Tom Hiddleston	Nominated
2020	Tony Award	Best Direction of a Play	Jamie Lloyd	Nominated
2020	Tony Award	Best Scenic Design of a Play	Soutra Gilmour	Nominated
2020	Drama League Award	Outstanding Revival of a Play		Nominated
2020	Drama League Award	Distinguished Performance	Tom Hiddleston	Nominated
2020	Outer Critics Circle Award	Outstanding Revival of a Play		Honoree
2020	Outer Critics Circle Award	Outstanding Director of a Play	Jamie Lloyd	Honoree
2020	Outer Critics Circle Award	Outstanding Actor in a Play	Tom Hiddleston	Honoree

== Works cited ==
"The Betrayal". Episode Guide for Seinfeld. Sony Pictures, 2009. World Wide Web. 11 March 2009. (Includes a video clip.)

Bakewell, Joan. The Centre of the Bed. London: Hodder & Stoughton, 2003. ISBN 0-340-82310-0 (10). ISBN 978-0-340-82310-1 (13). Print.

Billington, Michael. Harold Pinter. Rev. and expanded ed. 1996. London: Faber and Faber, 2007. Print.

Bryden, Mary. Rev. of Betrayal (One from the Heart at The Camberley Theatre, February 2002). 204–06 in "The Caretaker and Betrayal. The Pinter Review: Collected Essays 2003 and 2004. Ed. Francis Gillen and Steven H. Gale. Tampa: U of Tampa P, 2004. 202–06. ISBN 1-879852-17-9 (10). ISBN 978-1-879852-17-4 (13). Print.

Canby, Vincent. "Movie Review: Betrayal (1983): Pinter's 'Betrayal,' Directed by David Jones". New York Times, Movies. New York Times Company, 20 February 1983. Web. 11 March 2009.

Ebert, Roger. "Movies: 'Betrayal' " Archived 25 September 2012 at the Wayback Machine. Chicago Sun-Times 18 March 1983. RogerEbert.com, 2009. Web. 11 March 2009.

Lawson, Mark. "Prodigal Son". Guardian.co.uk. Guardian Media Group, 31 May 2007. Web. 11 March 2009.

Merritt, Susan Hollis. "Betrayal in Denver" (Denver Center Theatre Company, Denver Center for the Performing Arts, Denver, CO. 29 May 2002). The Pinter Review: Collected Essays 2003 and 2004. Ed. Francis Gillen and Steven H. Gale. Tampa: U of Tampa P, 2004. 187–201. ISBN 1-879852-17-9 (10). ISBN 978-1-879852-17-4 (13). Print.

Pinter, Harold. Betrayal. 1978. New York: Grove Press, 1979. ISBN 0-394-50525-5 (10). ISBN 978-0-394-50525-1 (13). ISBN 0-394-17084-9 (10). ISBN 978-0-394-17084-8 (13). Print. (Parenthetical references in the text are to this edition, ISBN 0-394-17084-9. Pinter indicates pauses by three spaced dots of ellipsis; editorial ellipses herein are unspaced and within brackets.)

Quigley, Austin E. "Pinter: Betrayal". Chapter 11 of The Modern Stage and Other Worlds. New York: Methuen, 1985. 221–52. ISBN 0-416-39320-9 (10). ISBN 978-0-416-39320-0 (13). Print. Chapter 11: "Pinter: Betrayal" in Limited preview at Google Books (omits some pages). Web. 11 March 2009.
