= Don Amendolia =

American actor (born 1944)

- Born: 1944; Woodbury, New Jersey
- Occupation(s): Actor, singer and dancer

Don Amendolia (born 1944) is an American actor.

== Career ==
Born in 1944 in Woodbury, New Jersey, Amendolia was raised in Glassboro, New Jersey. He had a minor part in a school play at Camden Catholic High School and started acting as a student at Glassboro State College (since renamed as Rowan University).

He played Big Al Kennedy in the NBC soap opera Sunset Beach and had recurring roles on Twin Peaks, Night Court, and It's Garry Shandling's Show. He also guest-starred on Cheers, Newhart, Family Ties, Life Goes On, Valerie, Perfect Strangers, The Fresh Prince of Bel-Air, Ellen, Seinfeld, and Law & Order. He appeared in such films as Wayne's World (1992), Fearless (1993), Ed Wood (1994), Boogie Nights (1997), and Bounce (2000).

Amendolia directed one episode of Growing Pains and two episodes of Harry and the Hendersons. He has appeared on Broadway in 33 Variations, Stepping Out, and My One and Only. He directed the rotating cast of the Off-Broadway show, Wicked. He also played the Wizard on the second national tour of the musical Wicked. He played his first performance on December 9, 2009, replacing Tom McGowan.

Amendolia gave acting lessons and assigned workouts to the cast of the film Purple Rain.

== Filmography ==
=== Film ===
Year	Title	Role	Notes
1983	Without a Trace	Police Officer	
1987	The Secret of My Success	Executive	
1992	Wayne's World	Announcer	
1993	Fearless	Male Survivor	
1994	Ed Wood	Salesman	
1994	Twin Sitters	Pa Falcone	
1995	A Walk in the Clouds	Father Coturri	
1997	Boogie Nights	Bank Worker	
2000	Bounce	Infinity Attorney	
2001	Skeletons in the Closet	Detective Carlson	Direct-to-video
2014	Lucky Stiff	Uncle Tony	

=== Television ===
Year	Title	Role	Notes
1981	Ryan's Hope	Harry Quindy	3 episodes
1982	The Country Girl	Ralph	Television film
1983	Cheers	Henry 'Hank' Zenzola	Episode: "Affairs of the Heart"
1983	An Uncommon Love	Romaine	Television film
1984	Mama Malone	Dino Forresti	13 episodes
1988	Eisenhower and Lutz	Vito	Episode: "Pride and Prejudice"
1988	Family Ties	Tom	Episode: "Beyond Therapy"
1988	Newhart	Art	Episode: "Goonstruck"
1988, 1992	Night Court	Johnny Dugan / Mr. Barsotti	3 episodes
1989–1990	It's Garry Shandling's Show	Richie	3 episodes
1990	Designing Women	Ed	Episode: "Tough Enough"
1990	Framed	Ellis	Television film
1990	Cop Rock	Dr. Watoon	Episode: "Happy Mudder's Day"
1990	Twin Peaks	Emory Battis	5 episodes
1991	Valerie	Phil Morton	Episode: "A Sneaking Suspicion"
1991	Perfect Strangers	King Ferdinand	Episode: "Weekend at Ferdinand's"
1991	The Fresh Prince of Bel-Air	Mr. Cummings	Episode: "Something for Nothing"
1991	Life Goes On	Producer	Episode: "The Smell of Fear"
1993	L.A. Law	Peter Swilling	Episode: "Where There's a Will"
1993	Precious Victims	Judge	Television film
1994	Frasier	Guard	Episode: "Travels with Martin"
1994–1995	Days of Our Lives	James Murchison / Maurice	3 episodes
1995	My Brother's Keeper	Father Gardiner	Television film
1996	Seinfeld	Dennis	Episode: "The Rye"
1996	Ellen	Mr. Koundakian	Episode: "Ellen: With Child"
1997	Sunset Beach	Big Al Kennedy	7 episodes
2002	In-Laws	Joe	Episode: "Crown Vic"
2003	Law & Order: Criminal Intent	Michael Carling	Episode: "But Not Forgotten"
2004	Law & Order	Gregory Finney	Episode: "Cut"
