= Rajiv Joseph =

American playwright (born 1974)

- Joseph in 2026
- Born: June 16, 1974 (age 52); Cleveland, Ohio, U.S.
- Education: Miami University (BA); New York University (MFA)
- Occupation: Playwright

Rajiv Joseph (born June 16, 1974) is an American playwright. He was named a finalist for the 2010 Pulitzer Prize for Drama for his play Bengal Tiger at the Baghdad Zoo, and he won an Obie Award for Best New American Play for his play Describe the Night.

== Early life ==
Rajiv Joseph was born and raised in Cleveland, Ohio. His mother is of French and German ancestry and his father is Malayali, from the South Indian state of Kerala. Raised as a Catholic, he attended Cleveland Heights High School and graduated from Miami University in Oxford, Ohio in 1996 with a B.A. in Creative Writing. While at Miami he was a member of the university's Men's Glee Club and its male a cappella group, the Cheezies.

Following graduation Joseph joined the Peace Corps, serving three formative years in the West African Republic of Senegal, including two years in Koular and the third in Kaolack. Joseph has stated about his time there: "Being in Senegal, more than anything else in my life, made me into a writer." His time in Senegal helped him develop the discipline of daily writing and inspired his "fascination with the power of language"; as he has stated: "It felt a little like being a child again, because your language skills are on the level of a 4-year-old, so the adults kind of ignore you, but the children cluster around you telling you what everything is called".

Joseph earned a Master of Fine Arts in Dramatic Writing from New York University's Tisch School of the Arts in 2004. He has taught Essay Writing at New York University and wrote for Seasons 3 and 4 of the Showtime series Nurse Jackie.

== Career ==
=== Theatre credits ===
Joseph's first play, Huck & Holden, debuted at the Cherry Lane Theatre in January 2006. The play also had a West Coast run at the Black Dahlia Theater in Los Angeles the following year. Joseph has stated that the story, about an Indian college student arriving in the United States, is based on his father's experiences coming to the States. His mixed-race background has given him what one critic has called a "fearlessness" about racial topics: "Being mixed-race has always been a part of my identity. You are never fully one thing or the other. You always feel a little apart, a little bit of an outsider, even when you are with your own family. That's an interesting perspective for looking at the world."

All This Intimacy premiered at New York City's McGinn/Cazale Theater in 2006.

Joseph's play The Leopard and the Fox, concerning the overthrow of Zulfikar Ali Bhutto, was produced Off-Off-Broadway in October to November 3, 2007, at the TBG Theatre at The Barrow Group.

Second Stage Theatre presented the world premiere of Joseph's Animals Out of Paper which ran from July 14, 2008 (previews) to August 24, 2008, at the McGinn/Cazale Theatre. Animals Out of Paper has been staged at Boise Contemporary Theater (2009), at the Ensemble Theatre in Sydney, Australia, at San Francisco Playhouse in 2010, Portland, Maine (January 2011), and Fort Worth, Texas (March 2011). In September 2014, Joseph's Animals Out of Paper had its Los Angeles, California premiere at East West Players starring C.S. Lee, Tess Lina, and Kapil Talwalkar. Animals out of Paper was presented in Bangalore, India in September 2014 at Jagriti Theatre. It was produced by Jugaad Co. and received positive reviews. The production featured close to 75 pieces of origami.

Joseph's Pulitzer finalist production of Bengal Tiger at the Baghdad Zoo, directed by Moisés Kaufman, debuted at the Kirk Douglas Theatre in Culver City, California in May, 2009. It ran at the Mark Taper Forum in Los Angeles from April 14 to May 30, 2010, and premiered on Broadway at the Richard Rodgers Theatre in March 2011, with Robin Williams playing the titular character. In October 2013 it had its premiere in San Francisco at San Francisco Playhouse where it was very well received in the press.

Gruesome Playground Injuries, starring Selma Blair and Brad Fleischer, had its world premiere in October 2009 at the Alley Theatre in Houston, Texas. Another staging at the Woolly Mammoth Theatre Company in Washington, D.C. ran in May 2010. Its Off-Broadway production opened January 2011 at the Second Stage Theatre, starring Pablo Schreiber and Jennifer Carpenter.

The North Pool premiered at TheatreWorks in Silicon Valley (California) in March–April 2011. It was called a "Psychological Thriller" by TheatreWorks. The Barrington Stage Company, The Berkshires presented The North Pool in July 2012. The played opened Off-Broadway at the Vineyard Theatre in February 2013 (previews), directed by Giovanna Sardelli.

The Monster at the Door debuted at Houston's Alley Theatre in May 2011.

The Lake Effect premiered at Chicago's Silk Road Rising on April 23, 2013. The production received the Joseph Jefferson Award for Best New Work. Its TheatreWorks in Silicon Valley production opened March 2015, starring Adam Poss, Nilanjana Bose and Jason Bowen.

His play Guards at the Taj premiered Off-Broadway, produced by the Atlantic Theatre Company, in June to July 2015, directed by Amy Morton. The play was nominated for the 2016 Lucille Lortel Awards for Outstanding Director, Amy Morton, and won for Outstanding Play; Outstanding Scenic Design, Timothy R. Mackabee; Outstanding Lighting Design, David Weiner; and Outstanding Sound Design, Rob Milburn and Michael Bodeen. The play won the 2016 Obie Awards for Best New American Play and Performance (Omar Metwally and Arian Moayed). The play then received its West Coast premiere at the Geffen Playhouse in October to November 2015, directed by Giovanna Sardelli and starring Raffi Barsoumian and Ramiz Monsef (with Naren Weiss and Danvir Singh understudying), in the Audrey Skirball-Kenis Theater. The play was nominated for the 2017 Ovation Awards and won for Best Production of a Play (Large Theater).

Also in 2015, Mr. Wolf premiered at the South Coast Repertory directed by David Emmes, set design Nephelie Andonyadis, lighting design Lap Chi Chu, sound design Cricket S. Myers, costume design Leah Piehl, and production manager was Joshua Marchesi. The show starred John de Lancie (Mr. Wolf), Jon Tenney (Michael), Tessa Auberjonois (Hana), Emily James (Thesera), and Kwana Martinez (Julie).

In 2019, Joseph received a Wordsmith Duo commission from Playing on Air to write a short play for radio with Pulitzer Prize winner, Doug Wright. The episode Clean Slate was released in spring 2020 and it featured Jeremy Shamos, Eisa Davis, Amy Ryan, and Eden Marryshow with direction by Mark Brokaw.

As part of the 2019–2020 season Steppenwolf Theatre and Center Theatre Group commissioned a new play by Joseph: King James which opened in Chicago in March 2022, after being delayed due to the COVID-19 pandemic.

In February 2025, Manhattan Theatre Club produced the world premiere of Joseph's Dakar 2000, directed by May Adrales and starring Mia Barron and Abubakr Ali.

His play Archduke premiered Off-Broadway on October 23, 2025 as part of Roundabout Theater Company's 2025-26 season, directed by Tony Award winner Darko Tresnjak and featuring Jake Berne, Tony nominee Kristine Nielsen, Tony nominee Patrick Page, Adrien Rolet, and Jason Sanchez.

=== Film credits ===
In December 2013, Joseph and fellow playwright Tarell Alvin McCraney were featured in Robert Levi's PBS Film, Playwright: From Page to Stage, which aired on Independent Lens.

Rajiv co-wrote the script for Draft Day in 2014 and Army of One in 2016.

== Awards and honors ==
- 2008: Vineyard Theatre's Paula Vogel Award given to emerging playwrights.
- 2008: Bengal Tiger at the Baghdad Zoo was chosen by the NEA as one of two Outstanding New American plays.
- 2009: Kesselring Fellowship awarded to emerging dramatists.
- 2009: Joseph participated in the 10th Annual Sundance Playwrights Retreat in Ucross, Wyoming.
- 2009: Animals Out of Paper received the Lucille Lortel Award nomination for Outstanding Play.
- 2009: 2009 LA Stage Alliance Ovation Awards nominated Joseph for "Playwriting for an Original Play" for Bengal Tiger at the Baghdad Zoo. The play also won five Backstage Garland Awards in 2010.
- 2009: Whiting Award, an international award given annually to 10 writers of fiction, nonfiction, plays, and/or poetry.
- 2010: Pulitzer Prize for Drama finalist for Bengal Tiger at the Baghdad Zoo.
- 2010: USA Rockefeller Fellow by United States Artists.
- 2010: The North Pool was awarded the 2011 Glickman Award for the best play to make its world premiere in the Bay Area.
- 2010: Edgerton New American Play Award for The North Pool.
- 2013: The Steinberg Playwright Award.
- 2015: The $150,000 Laurents/Hatcher Foundation Award for his new play Guards at the Taj.
- 2018: Obie Award for Best New American Play for his play Describe the Night.

== Works ==
=== Plays ===
- Huck & Holden (2006)
- All This Intimacy (2006)
- The Leopard and the Fox (2007)
- Animals Out of Paper (2008)
- Bengal Tiger at the Baghdad Zoo (2009)
- Gruesome Playground Injuries (2009)
- The North Pool (2011)
- The Monster at the Door (2011)
- The Lake Effect (2013)
- Guards at the Taj (2015)
- Mr. Wolf (2015)
- Describe the Night (2017)
- Archduke (2017)
- In the Sick Bay of the Santa Maria (2019)
- King James (2022)
- Letters of Suresh (2023)
- Dakar 2000 (2025)

=== Film ===
- Draft Day (2014), with co-writer Scott Rothman
- Army of One (2016), with co-writer Scott Rothman
