= 65th Evening Standard Theatre Awards =

- Date: 24 November 2019
- Location: London Coliseum
- Hosted by: Cush Jumbo

Highlights
- Most nominations: Downstate (4)

The 65th Evening Standard Theatre Awards were awarded in recognition of the 2018–19 London Theatre season on 24 November 2019 at the London Coliseum. Nominations were announced on 4 November 2019. The ceremony was presented by Cush Jumbo and co-hosted by Evgeny Lebedev, Damian Lewis, Helen McCrory and Anna Wintour.

== Eligibility and nomination process ==
All new productions and performances on the London stage between 20 October 2018 and 10 October 2019 were eligible for consideration.

== Ceremony ==
=== Presenters ===
- Ruth Wilson presented Best Actor
- Damian Lewis presented the Natasha Richardson Award for Best Actress
- Taron Egerton presented Best Musical
- Michael Kors and Gugu Mbatha-Raw presented Best Design
- Trevor Nunn presented the Editor's Award
- Glenda Jackson presented the Lebedev Award

=== Performances ===
- 10 students from the Brit School performed "Windy City"
- Sam Tutty performed "Waving Through A Window" from Dear Evan Hansen
- Miriam-Teak Lee and the & Juliet cast performed "Roar"

=== Sponsors ===
The headline sponsor was Michael Kors, and the following awards were presented in partnership:

- Best Play was awarded in partnership with Chanel
- Best Actor was awarded in partnership with the Ambassador Theatre Group
- The Natasha Richardson Award for Best Actress was awarded in partnership with Christian Louboutin
- Best Design was awarded in partnership with Michael Kors
- Emerging Talent was awarded in partnership with Access Entertainment

Bottega Veneta and Burberry were also partners of the event.

== Non-competitive awards ==
The Lebedev Award went to Peter Brook for his contribution to theatre, accepted by his daughter Irina Brook.

The Editor's Award went to Ian McKellen for his On Stage tour.

== Winners and nominees ==
Best Play	Best Musical
Sweat by Lynn Nottage, Donmar Warehouse and Gielgud Theatre; Downstate by Bruce Norris, National Theatre Dorfman; ear for eye by debbie tucker green, Royal Court Theatre; Glass. Kill. Bluebeard. Imp. by Caryl Churchill, Royal Court Theatre	Evita, Regent's Park Open Air Theatre; Come From Away, Phoenix Theatre; Fiddler on the Roof, Menier Chocolate Factory and Playhouse Theatre; Sweet Charity, Donmar Warehouse
Best Actor	Natasha Richardson Award for Best Actress
Andrew Scott, Present Laughter, Old Vic; K. Todd Freeman, Downstate, National Theatre Dorfman; Francis Guinan, Downstate, National Theatre Dorfman; Tom Hiddleston, Betrayal, Harold Pinter Theatre; Wendell Pierce, Death of a Salesman, Young Vic and Piccadilly Theatre	Maggie Smith, A German Life, Bridge Theatre; Hayley Atwell, Rosmersholm, Duke of York's Theatre; Cecilia Noble, Downstate and Faith, Hope and Charity, National Theatre Dorfman; Juliet Stevenson, The Doctor, Almeida Theatre; Anjana Vasan, A Doll's House, Lyric Hammersmith
Best Musical Performance	Milton Shulman Award for Best Director
Anne-Marie Duff, Sweet Charity, Donmar Warehouse; Andy Nyman, Fiddler on the Roof, Menier Chocolate Factory and Playhouse Theatre; Sheridan Smith, Joseph and the Amazing Technicolour Dreamcoat, London Palladium	Robert Icke, The Doctor and The Wild Duck, Almeida Theatre; Miranda Cromwell and Marianne Elliott, Death of a Salesman, Young Vic and Piccadilly Theatre; Jamie Lloyd, Betrayal, Harold Pinter Theatre
Best Design	Charles Wintour Award for Most Promising Playwright
Bunny Christie, A Midsummer Night's Dream, Bridge Theatre; Fly Davis, Appropriate, Donmar Warehouse; Tom Scutt, A Very Expensive Poison, The Old Vic	Jasmine Lee-Jones, seven methods of killing kylie jenner, Royal Court; Zoe Cooper, Out of Water, Orange Tree Theatre; Yasmin Joseph, J'Ouvert, Theatre503; Ross Willis, Wolfie, Theatre503
Emerging Talent Award
Laurie Kynaston, The Son, Kiln Theatre and Duke of York's Theatre; Shiloh Coke, Chiaroscuro, Bush Theatre; Grace Molony, The Watsons, Chichester Festival Theatre and Menier Chocolate Factory; Bobby Stallwood, Faith, Hope and Charity, National Theatre Dorfman

=== Multiple nominations ===
4 nominations

- Downstate

2 nominations

- Betrayal
- Death of a Salesman
- The Doctor
- Faith, Hope and Charity
- Fiddler on the Roof
- Sweet Charity

== See also ==
- 2019 Laurence Olivier Awards
- 2020 Laurence Olivier Awards
