= Evening Standard Theatre Award for Best Actress =

British theatre award

- Awarded for: Best Actress
- Location: United Kingdom
- Presented by: Evening Standard
- Currently held by: Hayley Atwell for Much Ado About Nothing (2025)

The Evening Standard Theatre Award for Best Actress, also known as the Natasha Richardson Award for Best Actress since 2009, is an annual award presented by the Evening Standard in recognition of achievement in British theatre.

== Winners and nominees ==
=== 1950s ===
Year	Actor	Work	Character
1955
1955	Siobhán McKenna	Saint Joan	Joan of Arc
1956
1956	Peggy Ashcroft	The Chalk Garden	Miss Madrigal
1957
1957	Brenda de Banzie	The Entertainer	Phoebe Rice
1958
1958	Gwen Ffrangcon-Davies	Long Day's Journey into Night	Mary Tyrone
1959
1959	Flora Robson	The Aspern Papers	Miss Tina

=== 1960s ===
Year	Actor	Work	Character
1960
1960	Dorothy Tutin	Twelfth Night	Viola
1961
1961	Vanessa Redgrave	As You Like It	Rosalind
1962
1962	Maggie Smith	The Private Ear and The Public Eye	Doreen / Belinda
1963
1963	Joan Plowright	Saint Joan	Joan of Arc
1964
1964	Peggy Ashcroft	The Wars of the Roses	Margaret of Anjou
1965
1965	Eileen Atkins	The Killing of Sister George	Alice "Childie" McNaught
1966
1966	Irene Worth	A Song at Twilight	Hilde Latymer
1967
1967	Lila Kedrova	The Cherry Orchard	Madame Ranevskaya
1968
1968	Jill Bennett	Time Present	Pamela
1969
1969	Rosemary Harris	Plaza Suite	Karen Nash / Muriel Tate / Norma Hubley

=== 1970s ===
Year	Actor	Work	Character
1970
1970	Maggie Smith	Hedda Gabler	Hedda Tesman
1971
1971	Peggy Ashcroft	The Loves of Viorne	Claire Lannes
1972
1972	Rachel Roberts	Alpha Beta	Nora Elliot
1973
1973	Janet Suzman	Hello and Goodbye	Hester
1974
1974	Claire Bloom	A Streetcar Named Desire	Blanche DuBois
1975
1975	Dorothy Tutin	A Month in the Country	Natalya Petrovna
1976
1976	Janet Suzman	Three Sisters	Masha
1977
1977	Alison Steadman	Abigail's Party	Beverly Moss
1978
1978	Kate Nelligan	Plenty	Susan
1979
1979	Vanessa Redgrave	The Lady from the Sea	Bolette

=== 1980s ===
Year	Actor	Work	Character
1980
1980	Judi Dench	Juno and the Paycock	Juno Boyle
1980	Frances de la Tour	Duet for One	Stephanie
1981
1981	Maggie Smith	Virginia	Virginia Woolf
1982
1982	Judi Dench	The Importance of Being Earnest and A Kind of Alaska	Lady Bracknell / Deborah
1983
1983	Geraldine McEwan	The Rivals	Mrs Malaprop
1984
1984	Maggie Smith	The Way of the World	Millamant
1985
1985	Vanessa Redgrave	The Seagull	Arkadina
1986
1986	Julia McKenzie	Woman in Mind	Susan
1987
1987	Judi Dench	Antony and Cleopatra	Cleopatra
1988
1988	Lindsay Duncan	Cat on a Hot Tin Roof	Margaret
1989
1989	Felicity Kendal	Ivanov and Much Ado About Nothing	Anna / Beatrice

=== 1990s ===
Year	Actor	Work	Character
1990
1990	Josette Simon	After the Fall	Maggie
1991
1991	Vanessa Redgrave	When She Danced	Isadora Duncan
1992
1992	Diana Rigg	Medea	Medea
1993
1993	Fiona Shaw	Machinal	Young Woman
1994
1994	Maggie Smith	Three Tall Women	A
1995
1995	Geraldine McEwan	The Way of the World	Lady Wishfort
1996
1996	Diana Rigg	Mother Courage and Who's Afraid of Virginia Woolf?	Mother Courage / Martha
1997
1997	Eileen Atkins	A Delicate Balance	Agnes
1998
1998	Sinéad Cusack	Our Lady of Sligo	Mai O'Hara
1999
1999	Janie Dee	Comic Potential	Jacie Triplethree

=== 2000s ===
Year	Actor	Work	Character
2000
2000	Paola Dionisotti	Further than the Furthest Thing	Mill Lavarello
2001
2001	Fiona Shaw	Medea	Medea
2001	Lindsay Duncan	Mouth To Mouth and Private Lives	Laura / Amanda Prynne
2001	Penelope Wilton	The Little Foxes	Regina
2002
2002	Clare Higgins	Vincent In Brixton	Ursula Loyer
2002	Helen McCrory	Uncle Vanya	Yelena
2002	Gwyneth Paltrow	Proof	Catherine
2003
2003	Sandy McDade	Iron	Fay
2003	Eileen Atkins	Honour	Honor
2003	Anne Mitchell	Through the Leaves	Martha
2004
2004	Victoria Hamilton	Suddenly Last Summer	Catharine
2004	Pam Ferris	Notes on Falling Leaves	Woman
2004	Kelly Reilly	After Miss Julie	Miss Julie
2005
2005	Harriet Walter	Mary Stuart	Elizabeth I
2005	Eve Best	Hedda Gabler	Hedda Tesman
2005	Clare Higgins	Death Of A Salesman	Linda Loman
2005	Kristin Scott Thomas	As You Desire Me	Elma
2006
2006	Kathleen Turner	Who's Afraid Of Virginia Woolf?	Martha
2006	Sinéad Cusack	Rock ‘n’ Roll	Eleanor / Esme
2006	Frances O'Connor	Tom & Viv	Vivienne Haigh-Wood
2007
2007	Anne-Marie Duff	Saint Joan	Joan of Arc
2007	Billie Piper	Treats	Ann
2007	Portia	The Member Of The Wedding	Berenice Sadie Brown
2007	Penelope Wilton	John Gabriel Borkman	Ella Rentheim
2008
2008	Margaret Tyzack	The Chalk Garden	Mrs St Maugham
2008	Penelope Wilton	The Chalk Garden	Miss Madrigal
2008	Lesley Sharp	Harper Regan	Harper Regan
2009
2009	Rachel Weisz	A Streetcar Named Desire	Blanche DuBois
2009	Deanna Dunagan	August: Osage County	Violet Weston
2009	Penny Downie	Helen	Helen
2009	Juliet Stevenson	Duet for One	Stephanie Abrahams

=== 2010s ===
Year	Actor	Work	Character
2010
2010	Nancy Carroll	After The Dance	Joan
2010	Elena Roger	Passion	Fosca
2010	Sheridan Smith	Legally Blonde	Elle Woods
2010	Sophie Thompson	Clybourne Park	Bev
2011
2011	Sheridan Smith	Flare Path	Doris, Countess Skriczevinsky
2011	Samantha Spiro	Chicken Soup with Barley	Sarah
2011	Kristin Scott Thomas	Betrayal	Emma
2012
2012	Hattie Morahan	A Doll’s House	Nora Helmer
2012	Eileen Atkins	All That Fall	Mrs. Rooney
2012	Cate Blanchett	Big and Small	Lotte Kotte
2012	Laurie Metcalf	Long Days Journey Into Night	Mary Tyrone
2013
2013	Helen Mirren	The Audience	Queen Elizabeth II
2013	Linda Bassett	Roots	Beatie Bryant
2013	Lesley Manville	Ghosts	Mrs. Helene Alving
2013	Billie Piper	The Effect	Connie
2013	Kristin Scott Thomas	Old Times	Kate / Anna
2014
2014	Gillian Anderson	A Streetcar Named Desire	Blanche DuBois
2014	Helen McCrory	Medea	Medea
2014	Tanya Moodie	Intimate Apparel	Esther
2014	Billie Piper	Great Britain	Paige Britain
2014	Kristin Scott Thomas	Electra	Electra
2015
2015	Nicole Kidman	Photograph 51	Rosalind Franklin
2015	Denise Gough	People, Places and Things	Emma
2015	Gugu Mbatha-Raw	Nell Gwynn	Nell Gwyn
2015	Lia Williams	Oresteia	Clytemnestra
2016
2016	Billie Piper	Yerma	Yerma
2016	Noma Dumezweni	Linda	Linda Wilde
2016	Helen McCrory	The Deep Blue Sea	Hester Collyer
2016	Sophie Melville	Iphigenia In Splott	Effie
2017
2017	Glenda Jackson	King Lear	King Lear
2017	Laura Donnelly	The Ferryman	Caitlin Carney
2017	Victoria Hamilton	Albion	Audrey
2018
2018	Sophie Okonedo	Antony and Cleopatra	Cleopatra
2018	Laura Linney	My Name Is Lucy Barton	Lucy Barton
2018	Carey Mulligan	Girls and Boys	N/A
2018	Cecilia Noble	Nine Night	Aunt Maggie
2018	Lia Williams	The Prime of Miss Jean Brodie	Jean Brodie
2019
2019	Maggie Smith	A German Life	Brunhilde Pomsel
2019	Hayley Atwell	Rosmersholm	Rebecca West
2019	Cecilia Noble	Downstate and Faith, Hope and Charity	Ivy / Hazel
2019	Juliet Stevenson	The Doctor	The Doctor
2019	Anjana Vasan	A Doll’s House	Nora Helmer

=== 2020s ===
Year	Actor	Work	Character
2022
2022	Jodie Comer	Prima Facie	Tessa Ensler
2022	Samira Wiley	Blues for an Alabama Sky	Angel
2022	Indira Varma	The Seagull	Irina Arkadina
2022	Ronke Adekoluejo	Blues for an Alabama Sky	Delia
2022	Sheila Atim	Constellations	Marianne
2023
2023	Patsy Ferran	A Streetcar Named Desire	Blanche DuBois
2023	Anjana Vasan	A Streetcar Named Desire	Stella Kowalski
2023	Sophie Okonedo	Medea	Medea
2023	Rachael Stirling	Private Lives	Amanda Prynne
2025
2025	Hayley Atwell	Much Ado About Nothing	Beatrice
2025	Cate Blanchett	The Seagull	Arkadina
2025	Sharon D. Clarke	The Importance of Being Earnest	Lady Bracknell
2025	Rosamund Pike	Inter Alia	Jessica Parks
2025	Ruth Wilson	Moon for the Misbegotten	Josie Hogan

== Multiple awards and nominations ==
=== Awards ===
Six awards

- Maggie Smith

Four awards

- Vanessa Redgrave

Three awards

- Peggy Ashcroft
- Judi Dench

Two awards

- Eileen Atkins
- Geraldine McEwan
- Diana Rigg
- Fiona Shaw
- Janet Suzman
- Dorothy Tutin

=== Nominations ===
Four nominations

- Billie Piper
- Kristin Scott Thomas

Three nominations

- Helen McCrory
- Penelope Wilton

Two nominations

- Hayley Atwell
- Sinéad Cusack
- Victoria Hamilton
- Clare Higgins
- Cecilia Noble
- Sophie Okonedo
- Sheridan Smith
- Juliet Stevenson
- Anjana Vasan
- Lia Williams

== See also ==
- Laurence Olivier Award for Best Actress
- Critics' Circle Theatre Award for Best Actress
- Tony Award for Best Actress in a Play
