= Glenn Davis (American actor) =

American actor and producer

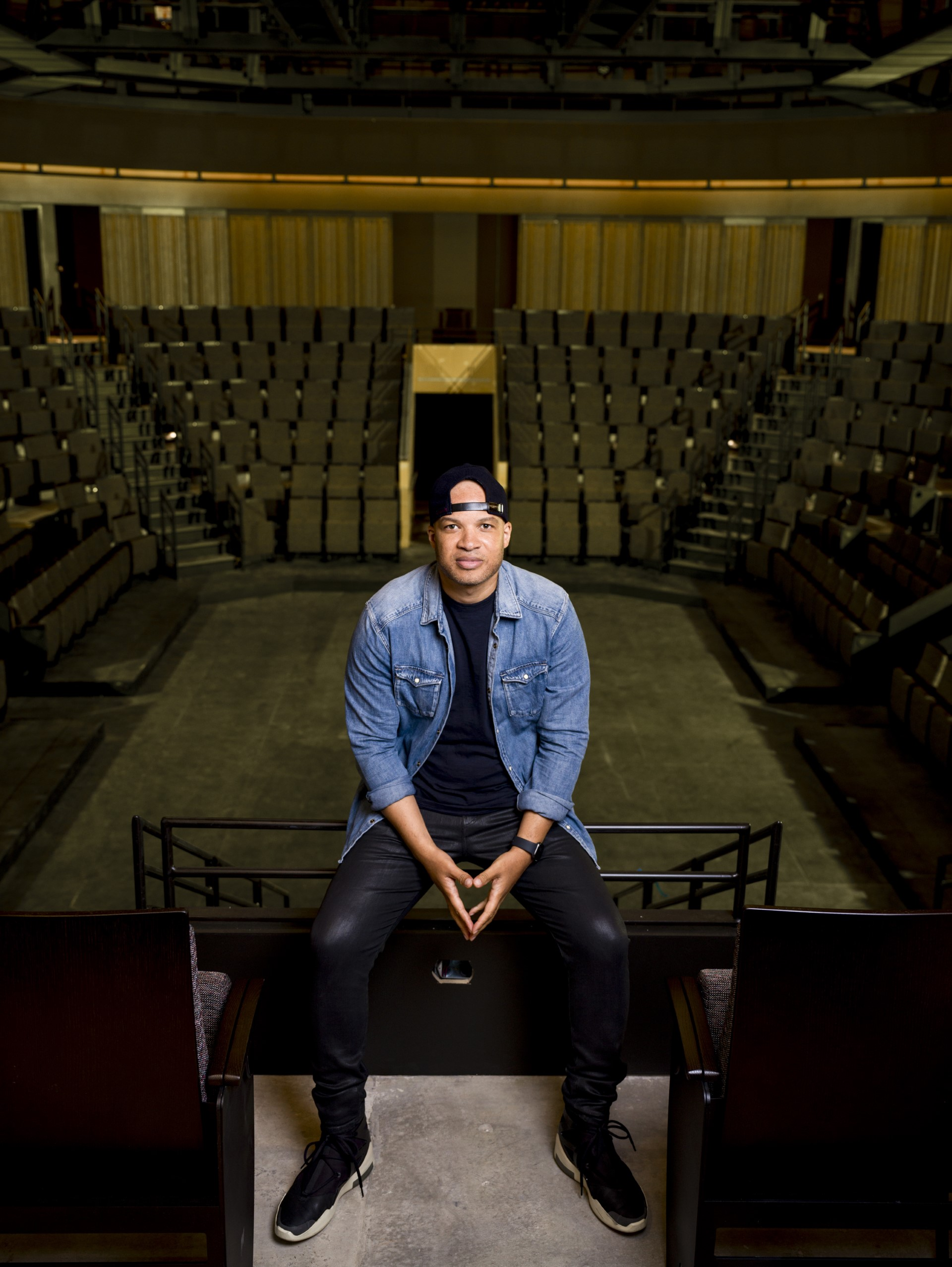
- Born: 1980 or 1981 (age 44–45); Oceanside, California, U.S.
- Education: DePaul University (BFA)

Glenn Davis (born 1980/1981) is an American actor and producer, serving with Audrey Francis as a co-artistic director of Steppenwolf Theatre Company, where he is the first person of color to fill that role there. He has been an ensemble member since 2017.

In 2025, he was nominated for the Tony Award for Best Featured Actor in a Play for his performance as Solomon "Junior" Jasper in Purpose, in its Broadway production.

== Education ==
Born in Oceanside, California, Davis grew up in the Chatham neighborhood on the South Side of Chicago. He attended the University of Chicago Laboratory Schools, where he currently sits on the Alumni Association Executive Board. Davis earned his Bachelor of Fine Arts in acting at The Theatre School at DePaul University in 2004. He was the first African American graduate of the Birmingham Conservatory of Classical Theatre at the Stratford Festival.

== Career ==
Davis is an actor and producer who has worked with organizations such as Williamstown Theatre Festival, Congo Square Theatre Company, Stratford Festival, The Young Vic, The Shakespeare Company, Steppenwolf Theatre Company, Vineyard Theatre, and MCC Theater. Davis appeared on Broadway in Rajiv Joseph's Bengal Tiger at the Baghdad Zoo. His TV work includes the Showtime series Billions, The Good Wife, Jericho, The Unit, and 24.

He is a partner at Cast Iron Entertainment with Sterling K. Brown, Brian Tyree Henry, Jon Michael Hill, Andre Holland, and Tarell Alvin McCraney, and the collective is in residence at Geffen Playhouse in Los Angeles. He is also an artistic associate at the Young Vic Theatre in London and the Vineyard Theatre in New York.

His other regional credits include Caligula, Polaroid Stories, Vassa Zheleznova (Williamstown Theatre Festival); and work at Goodman Theatre, Chicago Shakespeare Theater and Congo Square Theatre Company. International credits include Edward II, The Winter's Tale and As You Like It (Stratford Shakespeare Festival), as well as Othello at the Shakespeare Company. He also appeared off-Broadway in the Vineyard Theatre production of McCraney's Wig Out.

He was named an ensemble member at Steppenwolf Theatre Company in 2017, where his credits there include The Christians, Head of Passes, The Brother/Sister Plays, Downstate (also at the National Theatre in London and Playwrights Horizons in New York), and King James (also at Center Theatre Group in Los Angeles and Manhattan Theatre Club in New York).

In 2021, Davis and Audrey Francis were appointed as co-artistic directors of Steppenwolf Theatre Company. In the same year, he and longtime collaborator, Tarell Alvin McCraney, launched their production company, Chatham Grove, with a multiyear overall deal with UCP (a division of Universal Studio Group).

In 2025, Chicago Tribune theater critic Chris Jones designated Davis as the Chicagoan of the Year in Theater, singling out his doggedness in shepherding the commissioned play Purpose into production when it was not yet complete as rehearsals began, a point at which "lots of other artistic directors would have panicked or bailed."

== Acting credits ==
=== Theatre ===
| Year | Title | Role | Venue |
|---|---|---|---|
| 2003 | A Lesson Before Dying | | Steppenwolf Theatre Company |
| 2005 | Edward II | Edmund, Earl of Kent | Stratford Festival of Canada |
| 2008 | Wig Out! | Deity | Vineyard Theatre |
| 2010 | The Brothers Size / Marcus; Or the Secret of Sweet | Elegba / Marcus | Steppenwolf Theatre Company |
| 2010 | In the Red and Brown Water | Elegba | Steppenwolf Theatre Company |
| 2011 | Bengal Tiger at the Baghdad Zoo | Tom | Center Theater Group (Broadway) |
| 2013 | Head of Passes | Aubrey | Steppenwolf Theatre Company |
| 2016 | The Christians | Associate Pastor | Steppenwolf Theatre Company |
| 2018 | You Got Older | Mac | Steppenwolf Theatre Company |
| 2017 | Moscow Moscow Moscow Moscow Moscow Moscow | Solyony | Williamstown Theatre Festival |
| 2018 | Transfers | Performer | MCC Theatre |
| 2022 | Downstate | Gio | Playwrights Horizons, National Theatre of Great Britain, Steppenwolf Theatre Company |
| 2023 | King James | Shawn | Manhattan Theatre Club, Steppenwolf Theatre Company, Center Theatre Group |
| 2023 | Describe the Night | Vova | Steppenwolf Theatre Company |
| 2024 | Purpose | Solomon "Junior" Jasper Jr. | Steppenwolf Theatre Company, Helen Hayes Theatre (Broadway) |
| 2026 | Windfall | Marcus | Steppenwolf Theatre Company |

== Awards and honors ==
2022

- Outer Critics Circle Award for Best Supporting Actor: Downstate (nomination) – as actor
- Jeff Award for Best Principal Performer in a Play: King James (nomination) – as actor

2025

- Drama Desk Award for Outstanding Play: Purpose (winner) – as producer
- Tony Award for Best Play: Purpose (winner) – as producer
- Tony Award for Best Featured Actor in a Play: Purpose (nomination) – as actor
