= LaTanya Richardson Jackson =

American actress

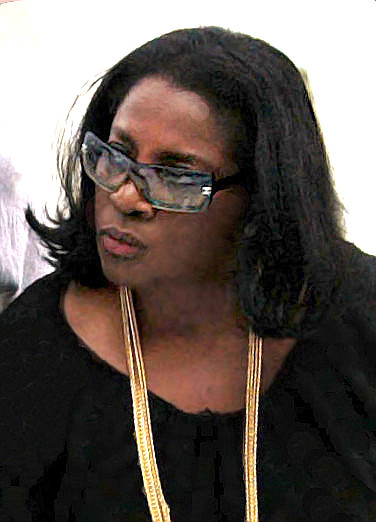
- Jackson in 2005
- Born: LaTanya Richardson; October 21, 1949 (age 76); Atlanta, Georgia, U.S.
- Other name: LaTanya Jackson
- Education: Spelman College (BA)
- Occupation: Actress
- Years active: 1989–present
- Spouse: Samuel L. Jackson (m. 1980)
- Children: 1

LaTanya Richardson Jackson is an American actress. She began her career appearing in off-Broadway productions, before playing supporting roles on television and film. Her performances are credited to her birth name, LaTanya Richardson, from 1989 to 2013.

Richardson has appeared in films including Fried Green Tomatoes (1991), Malcolm X (1992), Sleepless in Seattle (1993), When a Man Loves a Woman (1994), Losing Isaiah (1995), Lone Star (1996), U.S. Marshals (1998), and The Fighting Temptations (2003). Her television credits include 100 Centre Street (2001–2002), Show Me a Hero (2015), Luke Cage (2016–2018), and Rebel (2017).

== Early and personal life ==
She was born in Atlanta, Georgia on October 12, 1949. While attending Atlanta's historically Black, all-female Spelman College in 1970, she met Samuel L. Jackson, then a student at the historically Black, all-male Morehouse College. She and Jackson married in 1980 and have one child together (b. 1982). After her daughter's birth, Richardson stopped working regularly for family reasons. She is an honorary member of Alpha Kappa Alpha inducted during the 2026 Boule.

== Career ==
Richardson played Paulina Pritchett in the 2003 musical film The Fighting Temptations. She has appeared in four films with her husband, Samuel L. Jackson: Juice (1992), Losing Isaiah (1995), Freedomland (2006), and Mother and Child (2009).

In 2014, Richardson received a Tony Award nomination for Best Lead Actress in a Play for her performance in the play A Raisin in the Sun, her second appearance on Broadway after her debut in the 2009 revival of Joe Turner's Come and Gone. She appeared in Aaron Sorkin's adaptation of To Kill a Mockingbird on Broadway in the 2018–19 season.

From 2017 to 2023, Richardson made regular appearances as Maggie Pierce’s adoptive mother, Diane, on Grey's Anatomy.

In September 2022, Richardson made her directorial debut directing the Broadway revival of August Wilson's play The Piano Lesson at the Ethel Barrymore Theatre.

== Filmography ==
On film, she has been credited under her birth name, LaTanya Richardson, from 1991–2009, except for the 2006 film Freedomland.

=== Film ===
Year	Title	Role	Notes
1991	Hangin' with the Homeboys	Caseworker	
1991	The Super	Judge Smith	
1991	Fried Green Tomatoes	Janeen	
1992	Juice	Steel's Mother	
1992	Malcolm X	Lorraine	
1992	Lorenzo's Oil	Nurse Ruth	
1993	Sleepless in Seattle	Harriet	
1994	The Last Laugh	Elaine	Short film
1994	When a Man Loves a Woman	Dr. Gina Mendez	
1995	Losing Isaiah	Caroline Jones	
1996	Lone Star	Priscilla Worth	
1997	Loved	Attorney Rose Jackson	
1997	Julian Po	Darlene	
1998	U.S. Marshals	Deputy Marshal Savannah Cooper	
1998	Secrets		Short film
2003	The Fighting Temptations	Paulina Pritchett	
2006	Freedomland	Marie	First film credit as LaTanya Richardson Jackson
2007	All About Us	Cousin Bernice	
2007	Blackout	Mrs. Thompson	
2009	Mother and Child	Carol	Last film credit as LaTanya Richardson
2019	Juanita	Kay-Rita	Second (hereafter continuous) film credit as LaTanya Richardson Jackson
2023	You Hurt My Feelings	Sylvia	
2026	Diamond	Elizabeth	

=== Television ===
On television, she has been credited as her birth name, LaTanya Richardson, from 1989–2013, except for a 2012 episode of Damages.

Year	Title	Role	Notes
1989	A Man Called Hawk	Doris Gilbert	Episode: "Life After Death"
1991	Law & Order	Lorraine	Episode: "Life Choice"
1992	Law & Order	Anne Houston	Episode: "Sisters of Mercy"
1992	The Nightman	Emily	TV film
1992	Frannie's Turn	Vivian	Episodes: "Pilot", "Frannie and the Kitchen Sink"
1992	One Life to Live	Rodi	TV series
1993	Civil Wars	Van Beechley	Episode: "Hit the Road, Jack"
1993	Shameful Secrets	Louise Levy	TV film
1993	Cheers	Moderator	Episode: "Woody Gets an Election"
1994	Midnight Run for Your Life	Det. Dixon	TV film
1994	Party of Five	Jane Gideon	Episode: "Private Lives"
1994	Earth 2	Alex Wentworth	Episode: "A Memory Play"
1995	Chicago Hope	Mrs. Parnett	Episode: "Cutting Edges"
1995	NYPD Blue	Sister Cecilia	Episode: "Heavin' Can Wait"
1996	The Deliverance of Elaine	Edna	TV film
1997	Homicide: Life on the Street	Lynette Thompson	Episode: "Betrayal"
1998	Any Day Now	Mrs. Walker	Episode: "Call Him Johnny"
1998–1999	Ally McBeal	Attorney Yvette Rose	Episodes: "Story of Love", "Let's Dance"
1999	Introducing Dorothy Dandridge	Auntie	TV film
1999	Judging Amy	Lena Railsback	Episode: "Pilot"
1999	Once and Again	Counselor	Episode: "Boy Meets Girl"
2000	Hairstory		TV film
2001	Within These Walls	Melinda Donovan	TV film
2001–2002	100 Centre Street	Atallah Sims	Recurring role (8 episodes)
2003	Boston Public	Sheila	Episode: "Chapter 62"
2006	The Water Is Wide	Edna	TV film
2011	Harry's Law	Noreen	Episode: "In the Ghetto"
2012	Damages	Judge Jaclynn Ellis	Episode: "You Want to End This Once and for All?"; first TV credit as LaTanya Richardson Jackson
2013	The Watsons Go to Birmingham	Grandma Sands	TV film; last TV credit as LaTanya Richardson
2014–2015	Blue Bloods	Lt. Dee Ann Carver	Recurring role, Season 5; second (hereafter continuous) TV credit as LaTanya Richardson Jackson
2015	Show Me a Hero	Norma O'Neal	TV miniseries
2016–2018	Luke Cage	Maybelline "Mama Mabel" Stokes	Episodes: "Manifest", "The Creator"
2017	Rebel	Detective Traylynn Jones	2 episodes
2017–2023	Grey's Anatomy	Diane Pierce	Guest star (5 episodes; season 13, 18, and 19)
2018	American Masters	Narrator	Episode: Lorraine Hansberry: Sighted Eyes/Feeling Heart
2022	The Last Movie Stars	Maude Brink (voice)	3 episodes
2025	Criminal Minds	Caroline Lewis	Episode: "Tara"

=== Theatre ===
Year	Title	Role	Playwright	Venue
2009	Joe Turner's Come and Gone	Bertha Holly	August Wilson	Belasco Theatre, Broadway
2014	A Raisin in the Sun	Lena Younger	Lorraine Hansberry	Ethel Barrymore Theatre, Broadway
2018–2019	To Kill a Mockingbird	Calpurnia	Aaron Sorkin	Shubert Theatre, Broadway
2022	The Piano Lesson	—N/a	August Wilson	Director; Ethel Barrymore Theatre, Broadway
2025	Purpose	Claudine Jasper	Branden Jacobs-Jenkins	Hayes Theater, Broadway

== Awards and nominations ==
Year	Award	Category	Project	Result	Ref.
2010	Audie Award	Audiobook of the Year	Nelson Mandela's Favorite African Folktales	Won	
2010	Audie Award	Multi-Voiced Performance	Nelson Mandela's Favorite African Folktales	Won	
2014	Tony Award	Best Actress in a Play	A Raisin in the Sun	Nominated	
2014	Black Reel Awards	Outstanding Supporting Actress in a TV Movie	The Watsons Go to Birmingham	Nominated	
2016	Image Award	Outstanding Actress in a Television Movie or Limited Series	Show Me a Hero	Nominated	
2025	Tony Award	Best Actress in a Play	Purpose	Nominated	
