= King James (play) =

2022 play by Rajiv Joseph

- King James poster
- Written by: Rajiv Joseph
- Characters: Matt; Shawn
- Mute: DJ
- Setting: Cleveland

Premiere
- Date: March 3, 2022
- Place: Steppenwolf Theatre
- Directed by: Kenny Leon

King James is a play written by Rajiv Joseph, which premiered in March 2022 at the Steppenwolf Theatre in Chicago, under the direction of Kenny Leon. The play's action is launched when two characters meet: Matt (portrayed in the play's Steppenwolf premiere by Chris Perfetti), a Cleveland bartender with Cavaliers tickets he needs to sell, and Shawn (portrayed there by Glenn Davis), a writer who has recently published a short story and wants to buy tickets for the Cleveland Cavaliers' 2003–2004 season – the first season with LeBron James playing.

== Development ==
Rajiv Joseph began to write the play in 2017, motivated to "preserve some of the experience of following and cheering" for LeBron James. "Rajiv's first draft had a lot of basketball in it," according to Glenn Davis, who is a long-term friend of Joseph, but "as each new draft came in, the specifics about basketball began to disappear because Rajiv wanted to make sure this play was about friendship."

The play's premiere, a co-production of Steppenwolf and the Center Theatre Group in Los Angeles, was originally scheduled for production during their 2019–2020 seasons. The premiere was delayed for two years due to the COVID-19 pandemic. Rajiv Joseph, Glenn Davis, and Kenny Leon, who was directing at Steppenwolf for the first time, were all longtime basketball fans, unlike Chris Perfetti. Joseph said to Sarah Bahr of The New York Times: "Sometimes a love of the game is the only way people who have difficulty expressing their feelings are able to articulate them."

== Synopsis ==
The play's drama derives from the ups and downs of Matt and Shawn's friendship, their careers, and LeBron James's career. The play's four scenes take place at the time of Matt's and Shawn's initial meeting during the 2003–2004 Cavaliers season; six and a half years later at the time of The Decision, when James announced he was leaving Cleveland for the Miami Heat; in 2014, when James returned to Cleveland; and in 2016, the end of Cleveland's championship drought.

== Notable productions ==
=== Premieres: Chicago and Los Angeles ===
The play premiered in 2022, in the Steppenwolf/Center Theatre Group co-production. The Chicago production ran from March 13 through April 10, 2022 (with earlier previews), at Steppenwolf. The Los Angeles production ran from June 8 to July 3, 2022 (with previews beginning June 1) at the Mark Taper Forum. In both Chicago and Los Angeles, Kenny Leon directed, Glenn Davis played Shawn, and Chris Perfetti played Matt.

=== New York premiere ===
In the play's New York premiere, the Manhattan Theatre Club presented the Steppenwolf/Center Theatre Group production at New York City Center Stage I, an off-Broadway venue, from May 16 to June 18, 2023. Again, Leon directed, and Davis and Perfetti played the two lead roles. Khloe Janel was featured in an additional role, as DJ.

=== Cleveland performances ===
The play came to Cleveland, its setting and its author's home town, in 2025 when the Cleveland Play House produced the play (with City Theatre, Pittsburgh). This production was scheduled to run at the Outcalt Theatre at Playhouse Square from March 1 to March 23, 2025. The production was directed by Monteze Freeland, and starred Robert Hunter as Shawn and Matthew Patrick Trimm as Matt.

=== Other regional performances ===
Other U.S. regional performances include:

- Old Globe Theatre, San Diego, March 14–31, 2024
- TheatreWorks Silicon Valley, October 9–November 3, 2024
- Indiana Repertory Theatre, January 14 – February 9, 2025, co-production with Syracuse Stage
- Northern Stage, White River Junction, Vermont, January 29 - February 16, 2025
- TheaterWorks Hartford, January 30 – March 2, 2025, in partnership with Round House Theatre and Barrington Stage Company
- Syracuse Stage, February 26 - March 16, 2025, co-produced with Indiana Repertory Theatre
- George Street Playhouse, New Brunswick, New Jersey, March 18 - April 6, 2025
- City Theatre, Pittsburgh, April 19 - May 11, 2025, co-production with Cleveland Play House
- Round House Theatre, Bethesda, Maryland, in a "regional premiere," May 28 - June 22, 2025, with TheaterWorks Hartford and Barrington Stage Company
- Barrington Stage Company, Pittsfield, Massachusetts, scheduled for August 12–31, 2025, co-production with Theater Works Hartford and Round House Theater
- Little Fish Theatre, Redondo Beach, California, September 12 – 28, 2025
- Pioneer Theatre Company, Salt Lake City, scheduled for March 20-April 4, 2026

== Critical reception ==
A number of reviewers comment on the balance between the play's deep dive into basketball and its portrayal of friendship between sports fans. In his Chicago Sun-Times review, Steven Oxman wrote that the play has "brisk and witty dialogue" but that some attendees might expect more "thematic darkness or sociopolitical-aesthetic-spiritual contemplation," given Joseph's earlier plays. Joey Morona suggested that the assumed level of basketball know-how may be overly esoteric for those who are not Cleveland sports fans. Chris Jones of the Chicago Tribune emphasized that the play is essentially about friendship, saying that it "tells a very moving, accessible and openhearted story of two friends." He also suggested that the audience's hunger for more basketball content might be met "in future drafts by amping up the LeBron and other NBA content."

Barbara Vitello of the Daily Herald stressed the primacy that communication and friendship have in the dramatic arc of the piece. Nancy Bishop described it in Third Coast Review as "a buddy play in the best sense of that term" and suggests that people unfamiliar with the arcana of basketball might want to "get educated with a lot of basketball" before going. Bishop, Vitello, and Oxman all praised the enhancement of the music between scenes by DJ Khloe Janel. Sheri Flanders of the Chicago Reader noted the costume design by Samantha C. Jones as well as Todd Rosenthal's highly detailed scenic design.

== Awards ==
King James was nominated for the 2024 Outer Critics Circle Award for Outstanding New Off-Broadway Play.

The Silicon Valley production won five Bay Area Theatre Critics Circle awards for 2024 (all in the "in a house with more than 300 seats" category): Best Entire Production - Bay Area, Best Entire Production - South Bay, Best Principal Performance - Comedy to each of Kenny Scott and Jordan Lane Shappell, and Best Stage Direction, as well as three additional nominations for Sound Design, Set Design, and Lighting Design.
