= Diamond (2026 film) =

2026 crime drama film by Andy Garcia

- Directed by: Andy Garcia
- Written by: Andy Garcia
- Produced by: Andy Garcia; Jai Stefan; Frank Mancuso Jr.; Paul Soriano
- Starring: Andy Garcia; Vicky Krieps; Brendan Fraser; Rosemarie DeWitt; Bill Murray; Dustin Hoffman; Demián Bichir; Danny Huston; LaTanya Richardson Jackson; Yul Vazquez; Robert Patrick; Rachel Ticotin
- Cinematography: Tim Suhrstedt
- Edited by: Sandra Montiel; Emma E. Hickox
- Music by: Arturo Sandoval; Andy Garcia
- Production companies: Black Cap Pictures; CineSon Entertainment; Shrink Media; TEN17P
- Distributed by: Sony Pictures Classics
- Release date: May 19, 2026 (Cannes)
- Running time: 118 minutes
- Countries: United States; Philippines
- Language: English

Diamond is a 2026 crime drama film written, produced, and directed by Andy Garcia. It also stars Vicky Krieps, Brendan Fraser, Rosemarie DeWitt, Bill Murray, Dustin Hoffman, Demián Bichir, Danny Huston, LaTanya Richardson Jackson, Yul Vazquez, Robert Patrick, and Rachel Ticotin.

The film had its world premiere out of competition of the 2026 Cannes Film Festival on May 19. In July 2026, Sony Pictures Classics acquired distribution rights to the film for the world excluding France, Germany, Italy, and the CIS.

== Plot ==
The story follows Joe Diamond, a man haunted by his past, who uses his exceptional wit and keen observation skills to uncover hidden truths and solve crimes in this contemporary noir tale.

== Cast ==
- Andy Garcia as Joe Diamond, a private detective
- Vicky Krieps as Sharon Cobbs, a wealthy widow who employs Joe
- Brendan Fraser as "Danny Boy" McVicar, a legal expert
- Rosemarie DeWitt as Angel
- Bill Murray as Jimbo, a bartender
- Dustin Hoffman as Dr. Harry Kleiman, a coroner
- Demián Bichir as Alberto Echevarria, a gardener
- Danny Huston as Bruce Tenenbaum
- LaTanya Richardson Jackson as Elizabeth
- Yul Vazquez as The Butler, Sharon's butler
- Robert Patrick as Main Power Broker
- Rachel Ticotin as Mrs. Echevarria

== Production ==
In October 2025, principal photography began in Los Angeles on a passion project that Andy Garcia had been developing for almost 15 years. A crime drama film written, produced, directed, and starring Garcia, alongside Vicky Krieps, Brendan Fraser, Rosemarie DeWitt, Bill Murray, Dustin Hoffman, Demián Bichir, Danny Huston, LaTanya Richardson Jackson, Yul Vazquez, Robert Patrick, and Rachel Ticotin.

== Reception ==
The film has an 83% rating on Rotten Tomatoes based on 12 reviews, with an average rating of 6.3/10.

Jordan Mintzer of The Hollywood Reporter gave the film a positive review, describing it as: “ A nostalgic crime flick with heart.” Pete Hammond of Deadline Hollywood also gave the film a positive review and wrote, “With L.A. production, or lack of it, in the headlines a lot now, here is a movie waving the flag for it in ways that should be noticed. Garcia knew you can’t fake L.A. in a movie like this one. It has to be authentic, and Diamond is that and more.”

Therese Lacson of Collider gave the film a score of 7 out of 10.
