= All This Intimacy =

2006 play by Rajiv Joseph

- Written by: Rajiv Joseph
- Subject: A teacher impregnates three women in one week.
- Genre: Dramatic comedy
- Setting: Brooklyn & Manhattan

Premiere
- Date premiered: July 27, 2006
- Place premiered: Second Stage Theater

All This Intimacy is a 2006 play written by American playwright Rajiv Joseph that premiered at Second Stage Theater.

== Plot ==
Ty, in one week, impregnates his ex-girlfriend Jen, his married next door neighbor Maureen, and his university student Becca.

== Production history ==
All This Intimacy, produced by the Second Stage Theater, opened at on July 27, 2006. Directed by Giovanna Sardelli, set design David Newell, costume design Amy Clark, lighting design Rie Ono, and sound design Bart Fasbender. The show starred Thomas Sadoski (Ty), Gretchen Egolf (Jen), Adam Green (Seth), Amy Landecker (Maureen), Kate Nowlin (Franny), and Krysten Ritter (Becca).

== Reviews ==
Neil Genzlinger of the New York Times said of the original production, that it's "almost certainly unchallenged in the creative use of spermatozoa as a scenic motif." Marilyn Stasio of Variety, in a less glowing review, wrote that it's " a comedy that can’t decide how funny it wants to be".
