= The Teacher (2022 TV series) =

British drama television series

- Genre: Drama
- Created by: Mike Benson & Barunka O'Shaughnessy
- Written by: Mike Benson; Barunka O'Shaughnessy; Jon Gilbert (series 1); Michael Crompton; Rebecca Wojciechowski (series 2)
- Directed by: Dominic Leclerc
- Starring: Sheridan Smith; Samuel Bottomley; Cecilia Noble; Kelvin Fletcher; Sharon Rooney; David Fleeshman
- Composer: Edmund Butt
- Country of origin: United Kingdom
- Original language: English
- No. of series: 3
- No. of episodes: 12

Production
- Executive producer: Mike Benson
- Producer: Jyoti Fernandes
- Production location: Hungary
- Cinematography: Benjamin Pritchard
- Editor: John Phillipson
- Running time: 60 minutes
- Production company: Clapperboard Studios

Original release
- Network: Channel 5
- Release: 31 January 2022 – present

The Teacher is a British anthology drama, produced by Channel 5, created by Mike Benson and Barunka O'Shaughnessy. The first four-part series stars Sheridan Smith as Jenna Garvey, a secondary school teacher accused of having sex with a pupil. The episodes were shown over four successive evenings from 31 January 2022 and received positive reviews.

The programme was renewed for a second series, which began airing on 9 September 2024. The following year, it was renewed for a third series, which aired from 30 March to 2 April 2026.

== Plot summary ==
=== Series 1 ===
Jenna Garvey is an English teacher in a state school in Bradford, West Yorkshire. She is good at her job and popular with her pupils but has a shambolic personal life. She is charged with having sexual intercourse with one of her pupils, 15-year-old Kyle, after a drunken night out.

Jenna decides to plead guilty since she was too drunk to remember what happened on the night in question, and she wants to avoid forcing Kyle to give evidence. She receives a suspended sentence and a community service order. Soon after, she discovers that the evidence against her was fabricated. After conducting the investigation herself with the clues she found, Jenna finds the real culprit who framed her with the crime.

=== Series 2 ===
The series focuses on a new teacher, Dani, who is in an unfulfilling marriage with fellow teacher Tim. During a school trip, she sneaks off for a moment of passion with her colleague Jimmy Spencer. While they are gone, one of the students goes missing. Things begin to unravel as Dani is forced to lie to the police in order to cover up her affair.

== Cast ==
=== Series 1 ===
- Sheridan Smith as Jenna Garvey, an English teacher at Earlbridge School
- Samuel Bottomley as Kyle Hope, a pupil at Earlbridge
- Cecilia Noble as Pauline, Jenna's colleague
- David Fleeshman as Roger Garvey, Jenna's father and a retired teacher
- Sharon Rooney as Nina, another English teacher who is jealous of Jenna
- Kelvin Fletcher as Jack, Jenna's colleague
- Sarah-Jane Potts as Mary, Kyle's mother
- Tillie Amartey as Izzy, a pupil who is the daughter of Nina
- Ian Puleston-Davies as Brian
- Karen Henthorn as DI Sowerby
- Aaronveer Dhillon as Adnan
- Anil Desai as Rick Mills, Earlbridge's headteacher
- Karen Bryson as Ava Mansouri, Jenna's solicitor
- Matt Devere as Jojo, a barman
- Reuben Johnson as Sean, Jenna's boyfriend
- Harry Hepple as Gabriel, a teacher

=== Series 2 ===
- Kara Tointon as Dani Oxley, art teacher
- Will Mellor as Jimmy Spencer, Dani's colleague and Matt's father
- Emmett J. Scanlan as Tim Oxley, Dani's husband and colleague
- Cal O'Driscoll as Zac Webster, a student
- Forrest Bothwell as Matt Spencer, Jimmy's son
- Gwynne McElveen as DI Linda Calgetti, detective
- Lila Coleman as Bel Clarke, Dani's colleague
- Ebby O'Toole-Acheampong as Chloe Novak, a student
- Joni Morris as Sienna Ryan, a student
- Niamh McCann as Nina Webster, Zac's mother
- John Nayagam as Robert Caufield, Dani's headmaster
- Callum Jess as Stan Oxley, Dani and Tim's son

=== Series 3 ===
- Victoria Hamilton as Helen Simpson, Drama teacher
- Steve Edge as Terry Simpson, Helen's husband
- Rochenda Sandall as Tessa Gibson, Helen's colleague and friend
- Alice Grant as Cressida Bancroft, a student
- Olly Rhodes as Sam Simpson, Helen's son
- Peter Ash as Sebastian Blake, a teacher
- Navin Chowdhry as Simon Cookson, Headteacher
- Ellis Jupiter as Dee Rainford-Thomas, a student
- Shak Benjamin as Leo Dalton, a student
- Malek Alkoni as Miles Crawford, a student
- Natalie Gavin as DS O’Brien

== Production ==
Although the first series is set entirely in Bradford, it was actually filmed mainly in Budapest, Hungary, due to the financial savings offered by both lower overseas operating costs, and the financial support of the Hungarian Government and the Hungarian Film Institute. With filming taking place during the peak of the COVID-19 pandemic in 2021, executive producer Mike Benson, the cast and crew had to adhere to severe restrictions in order to lessen the risk of infection in Hungary, without it being noticeable in the film. The final editing process combined the Hungarian material with a smaller number of scenes shot outdoors in and around Newcastle/Gateshead to add local landmarks for setting the scene.

== Episodes ==
=== Series 1 (2022) ===
No.	Title	Directed by	Written by	Original release date	UK viewers (millions)
1	"Episode 1"	Dominic Leclerc	Mike Benson & Barunka O'Shaughnessy	31 January 2022	5.63
2	"Episode 2"	Dominic Leclerc	Mike Benson & Barunka O'Shaughnessy	1 February 2022	5.37
3	"Episode 3"	Dominic Leclerc	Mike Benson & Barunka O'Shaughnessy and Jon Gilbert	2 February 2022	5.23
4	"Justice"	Dominic Leclerc	Mike Benson & Barunka O'Shaughnessy	3 February 2022	5.59

=== Series 2 (2024) ===
No.	Title	Directed by	Written by	Original release date	UK viewers (millions)
1	"Episode 1"	Dominic Leclerc	Michael Crompton	9 September 2024	N/A
2	"Episode 2"	Dominic Leclerc	Rebecca Wojciechowski	10 September 2024	N/A
3	"Episode 3"	Dominic Leclerc	Rebecca Wojciechowski	11 September 2024	N/A
4	"Episode 4"	Dominic Leclerc	Michael Crompton	12 September 2024	N/A

=== Series 3 (2026) ===
No.	Title	Directed by	Written by	Original release date	UK viewers (millions)
1	"Episode 1"	Dominic Leclerc	Ciara Conway	30 March 2026	N/A
2	"Episode 2"	Dominic Leclerc	Kat Rose-Martin	31 March 2026	N/A
3	"Episode 3"	Dominic Leclerc	David Persiva	1 April 2026	N/A
4	"Episode 4"	Dominic Leclerc	Ciara Conway	2 April 2026	N/A

== Reception ==
=== Series 1 ===
The first series received generally positive reviews. Carol Midgley of The Times gave the first series four out five stars, dubbing it "highly entertaining" thanks to Smith and the lurid plot elements. Sean O'Grady of The Independent also gave it four out five stars, praising Smith's performance. Anita Singh of The Daily Telegraph gave it three out of five stars, also commending Smith but questioning the script and direction.

=== Series 2 ===
The second series received mostly negative reviews. Emily Watkins of i News was critical of the series' writing and characters, dubbing it "heavy handed silliness". Anita Singh of The Daily Telegraph awarded two out of five stars, saying "the ending isn't bad" but "the quality of the drama is pretty schlocky".
