= Bruce Norris (playwright) =

American dramatist

- Born: May 16, 1960 (age 66)
- Education: Northwestern University (BA)
- Occupations: Playwright; actor
- Writing career
- Language: English
- Genre: Theatre
- Notable work: Clybourne Park
- Notable awards: Pulitzer Prize for Drama (2011)

Bruce Norris (born May 16, 1960) is an American character actor and playwright associated with the Steppenwolf Theatre Company of Chicago. His play Clybourne Park won the 2011 Pulitzer Prize for Drama.

== Career ==
After graduating from Northwestern University in 1982 with a degree in theatre, Norris set out to become an actor. He performed at Victory Gardens Theater, the Goodman Theatre, Steppenwolf Theatre and on Broadway. His Broadway acting credits include David Hirson's Wrong Mountain (January to February 2000), Wendy Wasserstein's An American Daughter (April to June 1997), and Neil Simon's Biloxi Blues (March 1985 to June 1986).

During this time he was also "hired and fired from a number of television pilots." These rejections led to writing his first play, The Actor Retires, produced in a late-night venue in Chicago in 1991 and then as a radio play for later broadcast by WFMT-FM as part of the Guest Quarters Hotel's series Chicago Theatres on the Air in 1992.

Since 2000, Steppenwolf Theatre has produced ten of Norris's plays.

Purple Heart was produced at the Steppenwolf Theatre from July 5, 2002, to August 25, 2002, with direction by Anna D. Shapiro and featuring Laurie Metcalf and Rosemary Prinz. The play relates the story of a Vietnam War widow and was commissioned by Steppenwolf.

We All Went Down to Amsterdam was produced at the Steppenwolf Theatre from June 12, 2003, to July 13, 2003, directed by Amy Morton.

The Pain and the Itch was produced at Steppenwolf Theatre from June 30 to August 28, 2005, directed by Anna D. Shapiro, with the cast that featured Jayne Houdyshell, Tracy Letts and Kate Arrington. It then was produced Off-Broadway at Playwrights Horizons from September 21, 2006, to October 15, 2006, directed by Shapiro, and at the Royal Court Theatre, London in June to July 2007. The Guardian (London) reviewer called the play "...social satire, in the style of Jules Feiffer, ... very funny." The play takes place at Thanksgiving at an upper-middle-class family's home. This was the fourth play by Norris that Steppenwolf had produced.

The Unmentionables ran at Steppenwolf Downstairs Theatre from June 29 to August 27, 2006, directed by Anna D. Shapiro. The play takes place in Africa. The play was produced at Yale Repertory Theater in May 2007, also directed by Shapiro. Charles Isherwood, in his review in The New York Times, called it an "acidic satire of bourgeois venality and hypocrisy."

A Parallelogram was produced at Steppenwolf Downstairs Theatre from July 1 through August 29, 2010, directed by Anna D. Shapiro. The cast featured Marylouise Burke, Tim Bickel, Kate Arrington and Tom Irwin. In an article for Steppenwolf, Marti Lyons writes about the theme of the play: "what do we do after we know the truth about ourselves? If we rid ourselves of all self-deception, how well can we function in the world? Is some self-protective illusion useful?" A Parallelogram opened Off-Broadway at Second Stage Theatre's Tony Kiser Theatre on August 2, 2017. Directed by Michael Grief, the cast features Celia Keenan-Bolger, Anita Gillette, Stephen Kunken and Juan Castano.

Domesticated had its world premiere Off-Broadway at the Lincoln Center Mitzi E. Newhouse Theater, running from October 10, 2013 (previews) to January 5, 2014. Directed by Anna D. Shapiro, the cast starred Laurie Metcalf and Jeff Goldblum. The play was commissioned by Lincoln Center Theater, and involves a political couple following a public embarrassment.

His play The Qualms premiered Off-Broadway at Playwrights Horizons, running from May 22 to July 12, 2015. Directed by Pam MacKinnon, the cast featured Donna Lynne Champlin, Noah Emmerich and Kate Arrington. The play was initially produced at Steppenwolf Theater in July and August 2014, also directed by MacKinnon.

Norris's new adaptation of Bertolt Brecht's satyrical play The Resistible Rise of Arturo Ui was premiered in London at the Donmar Warehouse in 2017. The play is set in the 1930s, and based on Adolf Hitler's rise to power, and also on the career of the Chicago gangster, Al Capone. It was simultaneously published in book form by Methuen Drama.

His play, The Low Road, was commissioned by London's Royal Court Theatre, where it premiered in 2013. It premiered Off-Broadway at the Public Theater on February 13, 2018. Directed by Michael Grief, it featured Tessa Albertson, Max Baker, Kevin Chamberlin, Daniel Davis, Crystal A. Dickinson, Gopal Divan, Harriet Harris, Jack Hatcher, Chukwudi Iwuji, Johnny Newcomb, Chris Perfetti, Susannah Perkins, Richard Poe, Dave Quay, Aaron Ray, Joseph Soeder, and Danny Wolohan. The play is described as a "historical parable that lampoons the eighteenth-century roots of free-market capitalism". Norris has referred to it as "a parody of a Henry Fielding novel, charting a young man' progress in life".

=== Clybourne Park ===
On April 18, 2011, Norris was awarded the Pulitzer Prize for Drama for his play Clybourne Park. The Prize committee citation described the play as "a powerful work whose memorable characters speak in witty and perceptive ways to America's sometimes toxic struggle with race and class consciousness." Prior to its Pulitzer award, the play won the Olivier Prize for "Best New Play", after being produced at the Royal Court Theatre in London in August 2010.

The play premiered Off-Broadway at Playwrights Horizons on February 21, 2010, and on Broadway at the Walter Kerr Theatre on April 19, 2012, and won the Tony Award for Best Play following its Pulitzer win. Directed by Pam MacKinnon, the cast featured Frank Wood, Annie Parisse, Jeremy Shamos, Crystal A. Dickinson, Brendan Griffin, Damon Gupton and Christina Kirk.

Until Clybourne Park, no play had ever won the Tony Award for best play, the Pulitzer Prize for drama and the Olivier Award for best new play.

== Personal life ==
Norris grew up in Houston, and was raised Episcopalian, but declared himself an atheist by age 13. He was in a relationship with playwright and director Mary Zimmerman for sixteen years. As of 2022, he lives in Chelsea, Manhattan with his partner, screenwriter Caroline Wood.

== Plays ==
- The Actor Retires (1992)
- The Vanishing Twin (Lookingglass Theatre, Chicago, 1996)
- The Infidel (2002)
- Purple Heart (2002)
- We All Went Down to Amsterdam (2003)
- The Pain and the Itch (Steppenwolf, 2005) (Playwrights Horizons, 2006)
- The Unmentionables (2006)
- Clybourne Park (2010)
- A Parallelogram (2010)
- The Low Road (2013)
- Domesticated (2013)
- The Qualms (2014)
- Downstate (Steppenwolf, 2018)

== Awards ==
- 2006 Whiting Award
- 2009 Steinberg Playwright Award
- 2011 Olivier Prize for Clybourne Park
- 2011 Pulitzer Prize for Drama for Clybourne Park
- 2012 Tony Award for Best Play for Clybourne Park
- 2023 New York Drama Critics' Circle for Best Play for Downstate
