= Anjana Vasan =

Indian-born actress (born 1987)

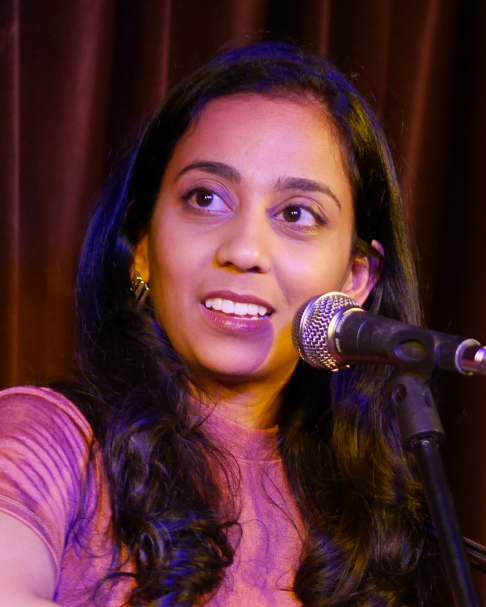
- Vasan in 2017
- Born: 31 January 1987 (age 39); Madras, Tamil Nadu, India
- Education: National University of Singapore (BA); Royal Welsh College of Music and Drama (MA)
- Occupation: Actress
- Years active: 2010–present

Anjana Vasan (/ˈɑːndʒənə/ /ˈvɑːsən/ AHN-juhna VAH-suhn; born 31 January 1987) is an Indian-origin Singaporean actress based in the United Kingdom. For her stage work, Vasan has won a Laurence Olivier Award. On television, she stars in the Channel 4 sitcom We Are Lady Parts (2021–2024), for which she was nominated for a British Academy Television Award. Her films include Wicked Little Letters (2023).

== Early life and education ==
Vasan was born in Madras (now known as Chennai), India to a Tamil Hindu family and moved to Singapore when she was four years old. She took theatre studies at the National University of Singapore before relocating to the United Kingdom, where she graduated in 2012 with a Master of Arts in Acting from the Royal Welsh College of Music & Drama.

== Career ==
In 2011, Vasan made her television debut as Lauren in two episodes of the Channel 4 comedy-drama Fresh Meat. After completing drama school the following year, she had small roles in the National Theatre Wales production of The Radicalisation of Bradley Manning, the Royal Shakespeare Company production of Much Ado About Nothing, as well as Golgotha at the Tristan Bates Theatre in London.

Vasan played a witch in Kenneth Branagh's Macbeth at the Manchester International Festival and for its New York run at the Park Avenue Armory. In 2015, she made her feature film debut with a small role in the live-action version of Cinderella.

In 2018, Vasan played Zahra Alsaadi in the Channel 4 sitcom Hang Ups and had a role in the anthology film London Unplugged. She played Rosa in Summer and Smoke at the Almeida Theatre and Duke of York's Theatre, marking her West End debut. This was followed by roles Rutherford and Son at the National Theatre and A Doll's House at the Lyric Hammersmith, the latter of which earned her an Evening Standard Theatre Award nomination.

Vasan starred in the 2020 Riz Ahmed-written and starring drama film Mogul Mowgli. She then reprised her role from the 2018 short Lady Parts as lead guitar player Amina in We Are Lady Parts on Channel 4 in 2021. For her performance, Vasan received nominations at the British Academy Television Awards, Independent Spirit Awards, and Gotham Awards. She also appeared in Joe Wright's Cyrano.

Vasan joined the main cast of the BBC spy thriller Killing Eve for its fourth and final series as Pam. She returned to the stage as Stella Kowalski in the London revival of A Streetcar Named Desire opposite Paul Mescal and Patsy Ferran. The production opened at the Almeida Theatre in 2022 and moved to the West End's Phoenix Theatre in 2023.

Her performance as Stella won Vasan the 2023 Olivier Award for Best Actress in a Supporting Role.

In 2023, Vasan starred in the Black Mirror episode "Demon 79" as Nida Huq, a woman in 1970s Britain who discovers a talisman. She had previously made a brief appearance in an earlier Black Mirror episode, "Nosedive".

She has a role in the comedy film Wicked Little Letters as PC Gladys Moss.

== Filmography ==
=== Film ===
Year	Title	Role	Notes	Ref.
2013	Macbeth	Third Sister	National Theatre Live	
2015	Cinderella	Maid		
2015	Behind the Beautiful Forevers	Manju Waghekar	National Theatre Live	
2016	A Midsummer Night's Dream	Hermia	Recording	
2017	Double Act	Manager	Short film	
2017	The Children Act	Kate		
2017	King Lear	Cordelia	Recording	
2019	Spider-Man: Far From Home	Reporter		
2020	Mogul Mowgli	Vaseem		
2020	Dara	Hira Bai	National Theatre Live	
2021	Cyrano	Sister Claire		
2023	Wicked Little Letters	PC Gladys Moss		
2026	True Love and Wormholes	Maggie	Short film	
2027	Amri	Indira Sundaram	Post-production	

=== Television ===
Year	Title	Role	Notes	Ref.
2011	Fresh Meat	Lauren	2 episodes	
2016	Call the Midwife	Tripti Valluk	Series 5, episode 8	
2016	Black Mirror	Tranquility Space Cop Fan	Episode: "Nosedive"	
2017	Ill Behaviour	Shazia	Miniseries	
2018	Lady Parts	Amina	Comedy short	
2018	Hang Ups	Zahra Alsaadi	5 episodes	
2019	Brexit: The Uncivil War	Interviewer	Television film	
2019	Pls Like	Lorna	Episode: "Kids"	
2019	Sex Education	Abortion clinic protester	Series 1, episode 3	
2019	Temple	Katie	2 episodes	
2021-2024	We Are Lady Parts	Amina	Main role, 2 series	
2022	Killing Eve	Pam	7 episodes	
2023	Black Mirror	Nida Huq	Episode: "Demon 79"	
2025	Towards Zero	Mary Aldin	Three-part miniseries	
2025	Black Mirror	Unnamed Player	Cameo Role, Episode: "USS Callister: Into Infinity"	

== Stage ==
Year	Title	Role	Notes	Ref.
2012	The Radicalisation of Bradley Manning		National Theatre Wales, Cardiff	
2012	Much Ado About Nothing	Servant	Royal Shakespeare Company	
2012	Golgotha	Loretta	Tristan Bates Theatre, London	
2013–2014	Macbeth	Third Sister	Manchester International Festival / Park Avenue Armory, New York	
2014	The Taming of the Shrew	Tranio	RSC tour	
2014	Behind the Beautiful Forevers	Manju Waghekar	National Theatre, London	
2015	Dara	Hira Bai	National Theatre, London	
2015	Image of An Unknown Young Woman	Leyla	Gate Theatre, London	
2016	A Midsummer Night's Dream	Hermia	Globe Theatre, London	
2017	Life of Galileo	Virginia	Young Vic, London	
2017	King Lear	Cordelia	Globe Theatre, London	
2018	An Adventure	Jyoti	Bush Theatre, London	
2018–2019	Summer and Smoke	Rosa/Nellie/Rosemary	Almeida Theatre and Duke of York's Theatre, London	
2019	Rutherford and Son	Mary	National Theatre, London	
2019	A Doll's House	Niru	Lyric Hammersmith, London	
2022–2023	A Streetcar Named Desire	Stella Kowalski	Almeida Theatre and Phoenix Theatre, London	
2024	BRACE BRACE	Sylvia	Royal Court Theatre, London	
2025	A Streetcar Named Desire	Stella Kowalski	Noël Coward Theatre, London / Brooklyn Academy of Music, New York	

== Audio ==
- Goblin Market (BBC)
- The Man Who Wore Sanitary Pads (BBC)
- Milady (BBC)

== Awards and nominations ==
Year	Award	Category	Work	Result	Ref.
2019	Evening Standard Theatre Award	Best Actress	A Doll's House	Nominated	
2021	Gotham Award	Outstanding Performance in New Series	We Are Lady Parts	Nominated	
2022	British Academy Television Award	Best Female Comedy Performance	We Are Lady Parts	Nominated	
2022	Independent Spirit Award	Best Female Performance in a New Scripted Series	We Are Lady Parts	Nominated	
2023	Laurence Olivier Award	Best Actress in a Supporting Role	A Streetcar Named Desire	Won	
2023	Evening Standard Theatre Award	Best Actress	A Streetcar Named Desire	Won	
2024	WhatsOnStage Awards	Best Supporting Performer in a Play	A Streetcar Named Desire	Nominated	
2024	British Academy Television Award	Best Actress	Black Mirror: Demon 79	Nominated	
2025	British Academy Television Award	Best Female Comedy Performance	We Are Lady Parts	Nominated	

== Discography ==
=== Albums, EPs ===
- Too Dark For Country (released 7 October 2017 - EP)
- Strange Country Jukebox (released 26 July 2021)
