= Clybourne Park =

2010 play by Bruce Norris

- Original language: English
- Written by: Bruce Norris
- Subject: Response to A Raisin in the Sun
- Genre: Drama

Premiere
- Date: February 1, 2010
- Place: Playwrights Horizons; New York City

Clybourne Park is a 2010 play by Bruce Norris inspired by Lorraine Hansberry's play A Raisin in the Sun (1959). It portrays fictional events set during and after the Hansberry play, and is loosely based on historical events that took place in the city of Chicago. It premiered in February 2010 at Playwrights Horizons in New York. The play received its UK premiere at the Royal Court Theatre in London in a production directed by Dominic Cooke. The play received its Chicago premiere at Steppenwolf Theatre Company in a production directed by Steppenwolf ensemble member Amy Morton. As described by The Washington Post, the play "applies a modern twist to the issues of race and housing and aspirations for a better life." Clybourne Park was awarded the 2011 Pulitzer Prize for Drama and the 2012 Tony Award for Best Play.

== Plot ==
=== Act I: 1959 ===
Grieving parents Bev and Russ are planning to sell their home in the white middle-class Chicago neighborhood of Clybourne Park. They receive a visit from their local clergyman, Jim, as well as their neighbor Karl and his deaf, pregnant wife Betsy. Karl informs them that the family buying their house is Black, and pleads with Russ to back out of the deal, for fear that falling area property values will drive the Lindners' neighbors away and isolate them if Black residents move in. It becomes apparent that the Black family moving in are the Youngers, the protagonists of A Raisin in the Sun, and the neighbor is Karl Lindner, the minor character from that play who attempted to buyout the Youngers into abandoning their plans to move into the neighborhood. The action is taking place approximately an hour following Karl Lindner's departure from the Youngers' Hamilton Park residence, where they have rejected his first buyout attempt. As arguments ensue about the potential problems of integrating the neighborhood, both couples awkwardly call on Russ and Bev's Black housekeeper Francine, and her husband, Albert, to express their opposing views. Russ finally snaps and throws everyone out of the house, saying he no longer cares about his neighbors, due to their shunning of his son Kenneth, a Korean War veteran who later committed suicide inside the house.

=== Act II: 2009 ===
Set in the same home as Act I, the same actors reappear playing different characters. In the intervening fifty years, Clybourne Park has become an all-Black neighborhood, which is now gentrifying. A white couple, Steve and Lindsey (played by the same actors who played Karl and Betsy in Act I), are seeking to buy, raze and rebuild the house at a larger scale, and are being forced to negotiate local housing regulations with a Black couple, Kevin and Lena (played by the same actors as Francine and Albert), who represent the housing board. Lena is related to the Younger family (and named after matriarch Lena Younger), and is unwilling to have the house torn down. Steve and Lindsey's lawyer, Kathy (played by Bev) is revealed to be the daughter of Karl and Betsy, and mentions that her family moved out of the neighborhood around the time of her birth. A cordial discussion of housing codes soon degenerates into one of racial issues, instigated by a concerned Steve, who feels that the mask of "political correctness" is allowing for a more subtle kind of prejudice against them. The alternating disgust and dismissal that follows reveals resentments from both parties, and several awkward comments lead to Steve being goaded into telling a racist, homophobic joke that offends both Kevin and the other lawyer, Tom (played by Jim), who is gay. The discussion is interrupted several times by Dan (played by Russ), a workman who has found Kenneth's army trunk buried in the back yard. As fighting erupts and the two couples turn on each other and themselves, Dan opens the trunk and finds Kenneth's suicide note.

In a short coda, we see Bev back in 1957, catching her son awake late at night, dressed in his army uniform. He claims to be dressing for a job interview, though it is clear that he is in the act of writing his suicide note. Leaving him to tend to the house, Bev observes that "I really believe things are about to change for the better."

=== Historical context ===
Hansberry's parents bought a house in the white neighborhood known as the Washington Park Subdivision, which gave rise to a legal case (Hansberry v. Lee, 311 U.S. 32 [1940]). The Hansberry family home, a red brick three-floor at 6140 S. Rhodes, which they bought in 1937, is up for landmark status before the Chicago City Council's Committee on Historical Landmarks Preservation.

== Productions ==
The play premiered Off-Broadway at Playwrights Horizons on February 21, 2010, before closing on March 21, 2010. Directed by Pam MacKinnon, the cast featured Frank Wood, Annie Parisse, Jeremy Shamos, Crystal A. Dickinson, Brendan Griffin, Damon Gupton, and Christina Kirk.

The play premiered in the UK in August 2010 at the Royal Court Theatre in London directed by Dominic Cooke, artistic director of the theatre, and starring Sophie Thompson, Martin Freeman, Lorna Brown, Sarah Goldberg, Michael Goldsmith, Lucian Msamati, Sam Spruell and Steffan Rhodri. It transferred to Wyndham's Theatre in the West End with most of the original cast, with the exceptions of Martin Freeman, who was replaced by Stephen Campbell Moore; and Steffan Rhodri, who was replaced by Stuart McQuarrie.

Even before the play premiered on Broadway, it had several notable productions in regional theatres: The Woolly Mammoth Theatre Company (Washington DC) staged it in March, 2010, with artistic director Howard Shalwitz directing. The Caldwell Theatre Company (Boca Raton, Florida) staged it in January 2011, with Clive Cholerton directing and starring Gregg Weiner, Karen Stephens, Brian D. Coats, Kenneth Kay, Patti Gardner, Cliff Burgess, and Margery Lowe. The play's Chicago premiere took place in September 2011 at Steppenwolf Theatre Company, directed by Steppenwolf ensemble member Amy Morton and featuring ensemble member James Vincent Meredith along with Karen Aldridge, Cliff Chamberlain, Stephanie Childers, Kirsten Fitzgerald, John Judd, and Brendan Marshall-Rashid; the production closed in November 2011.

In October/November 2011, the play was in residence with the Trinity Repertory Company in Providence, Rhode Island, with Brian Mertes directing and starring Mauro Hantman, Rachael Warren, Mia Ellis, Anne Scurria, Timothy Crowe, Tommy Dickie, and Joe Wilson Jr. From January to March 2012, the play ran at Arden Theatre Company in Old City, Philadelphia, directed by Ed Sobel and starring David Ingram, Julia Gibson, Erika Rose, Steve Pacek, Josh Tower, Ian Merrill Peakes, and Maggie Lakis. The Philadelphia Inquirer claimed, "A remarkably skillful cast directed by Edward Sobel creates characters that flirt with stereotypes, but become real and believable...This is a bitter satire that makes us laugh while it indicts us."

The play opened on Broadway at the Walter Kerr Theatre on April 19, 2012 (in previews starting March 26, 2012) for a 16-week limited engagement. The Off-Broadway cast reprised their roles. The play was nominated for several Tony Awards, and won the one for Best Play.

In 2013, the play was staged at the Guthrie Theater (May to June 2013), in rotating repertory with A Raisin in the Sun at the Dallas Theater Center, and in rotating repertory with Kwame Kwei-Armah's Beneatha's Place at Center Stage in Baltimore.

The play had several productions in 2014: in January at the Grand Rapids Civic Theatre, in February 2014, at the Wichita Center for the Arts in Wichita, Kansas, and in September as the season opener for the Hippodrome State Theatre in Gainesville, Florida. Also, the play's Australian premiere took place in March 2014 at the Ensemble Theatre in Sydney; the run was scheduled for five weeks, but sold out before opening night and was subsequently extended at another location.

== Film adaptation ==
On May 11, 2022, it was announced that Sarah Paulson, Anthony Mackie, Martin Freeman, Uzo Aduba, Nick Robinson, and Hillary Baack would star in a film adaptation of the play, to be directed by Pam MacKinnon.

== Awards and nominations ==
=== 2010 Off-Broadway premiere ===
Year	Award	Category	Work	Result	Ref.
2011	Pulitzer Prize for Drama		Bruce Norris	Won	

=== 2010 London production ===
Year	Award	Category	Work	Result	Ref.
2010	London Critics Circle Award	Best New Play		Nominated	
2010	Evening Standard Theatre Award	Best Play		Nominated	
2011	Laurence Olivier Award	Best New Play		Won	
2011	South Bank Sky Arts Award	Best Play		Nominated	

=== 2011 Chicago production ===
Year	Award	Category	Work	Result	Ref.
2011	Jeff Award	Best Play (Large)		Nominated	

=== 2012 Broadway production ===
Year	Award	Category	Work	Result	Ref.
2012	Tony Award	Best Play		Won	
2012	Tony Award	Best Direction of a Play		Nominated	
2012	Tony Award	Best Featured Actor in a Play	Jeremy Shamos	Nominated	
2012	Tony Award	Best Scenic Design of a Play	Daniel Ostling	Nominated	
2012	Theatre World Award	Outstanding Debut	Crystal A. Dickinson	Won	
2012	Drama League Award	Outtsanding Production of a Play		Nominated	
2012	Drama League Award	Distinguished Performance	Jeremy Shamos	Nominated	
