= Cecilia Noble =

British actress

- Born: Cecilia Angela Noble; 11 June 1966 (age 59); Hackney, London, England
- Education: Royal Central School of Speech and Drama
- Occupation: Actress
- Years active: 1992–present
- Television: The Bill; The Teacher; Killing Eve

Cecilia Angela Noble (born 11 June 1966) is an English actress who has appeared in various television series, films and on stage with a career spanning over thirty years. Some of her notable television roles include Beverley Jackson in The Bill (2004), Pauline in The Teacher (2022) and Barbara in Killing Eve (2022). Her notable theatre roles include Ruta Skadi in the play His Dark Materials (2003–2004) and Aunt Maggie in Nine Night (2018).

== Life and career ==
Noble was born on 11 June 1966 in Hackney, London and attended Our Lady and St Joseph's Catholic Primary school leaving in 1978. She trained at the Royal Central School of Speech and Drama. She began her acting career in 1992, with her first credited role being Grace Kelley in the crime drama Resnick. In 1995, she played Captain Tara Weldon in two episodes of Space Precinct.

In 1997, she appeared in the third series of Thief Takers as Marilyn Parker on a recurring basis. In 2004, Noble portrayed Beverley Jackson in seven episodes of the police drama The Bill. In 2015, she played Myrtle in the drama film Danny and the Human Zoo. In 2018, she appeared in an episode of Death in Paradise. In 2022, Noble appeared in the Channel 5 miniseries The Teacher. She played Pauline, a friend and colleague of co-star Sheridan Smith's character. She also appeared in the final series of Killing Eve as Barbara.

Noble has also appeared extensively in theatre and has received several nominations for her work. In 2014, she was nominated for the Laurence Olivier Award for Best Actress in a Supporting Role for her performance in The Amen Corner at the National Theatre, and in 2019, she was shortlisted for the Evening Standard Theatre Award for Best Actress for her performances in Faith Hope and Charity and Downstate. Her other theatre credits include Nine Night, His Dark Materials, Henry V, The Recruiting Officer and Is God Is.

== Filmography ==
Year	Title	Role	Notes
1992	Resnick	Grace Kelley	Lonely Hearts; episode 2
1995	Space Precinct	Captain Tara Weldon	2 episodes
1995	The Bill	Pauline Elliot	Episode: "Skin Deep"
1997	Thief Takers	Marilyn Parker	6 episodes
1999	Native	Unknown	Short film
2000	Storm Damage	Cynthia	Television drama
2000	New Year's Day	Mrs. James	Short film
2000	Holby City	Rachel Moore	Episode: "A Christmas Carol: Part 1"
2002	Mrs Caldicot's Cabbage War	Nurse Waite	Comedy drama film
2002	Holby City	Tracey Gordon	Episode: "Change of Heart"
2002	Rose and Maloney	Joyce	Television drama
2004	The Bill	Beverley Jackson	7 episodes
2005	Silent Witness	Jenny Sutherland	2 episodes
2011	EastEnders	Midwife Taneshia	Guest role
2011	Waking the Dead	Una Mason	2 episodes
2011	Coming Up	Martha	Episode: "Micah"
2011	Of Mary	Yvonne	Short film
2013	Our Girl	Elizabeth	Episode: "Pilot"
2014	Doctors	Khadija Haruna	Episode: "Fast and Furious"
2015	Nurse	Lorrie	4 episodes
2015	Rate Me	Jesus Christ	Short film
2015	Danny and the Human Zoo	Myrtle	Television film
2015	The Lady in the Van	Miss Briscoe	
2015	Together	Alison the Art Teacher	Episode: "Signs"
2015	Capital	Gail Carrow	Guest role
2016	Undercover	Mrs. Antwi	4 episodes
2016	Kaleidoscope	Monique	Film
2016	Black Mirror	Dame Patricia Lamarr	Episode: "Hated in the Nation"
2017	Uncle	Diane	Episode: "Dinner, I Hardly Knew Her"
2017	Call the Midwife	Sister Douglas	Series 6; episode 4
2017	Death in Paradise	Edwina Bousquet	Episode: "Murder in the Polls"
2018	Doctors	Miss Rose-Garden	Episode: "The Accidental Muse"
2018	Mumatar	Sandra	Short film
2018	Dead in a Week or Your Money Back	Wendy	Film
2018	Father Brown	Dame Bianca Norman	Episode: "The Great Train Robbery"
2020	Unprecedented	Dorothy	Series 1; episode 2
2020	Small Axe	Sandy	Episode: "Alex Wheatle"
2021	Casualty	Lucy Afolami	Guest role
2021	Silent Witness	Dionne Selwyn	2 episodes
2022	The Teacher	Pauline	Series regular
2022	Killing Eve	Barbara	Series regular
2022	Accidental Guru	Marcia	Post-production
2022	The Walk-In	Leona	2 episodes

== Awards and nominations ==
Year	Award	Nominated work(s)	Result	Ref.
2014	Laurence Olivier Award for Best Actress in a Supporting Role	The Amen Corner	Nominated	
2019	Evening Standard Theatre Award for Best Actress	Faith Hope and Charity and Downstate	Nominated	
