= Purpose (play) =

Stage play by Branden Jacobs-Jenkins

- Original language: English
- Written by: Branden Jacobs-Jenkins
- Genre: Drama
- Setting: Chicago, U.S. Present-day

Premiere
- Date: 2024
- Place: Steppenwolf Theatre Company

Purpose is a stage play written by American playwright Branden Jacobs-Jenkins. It premiered at the Steppenwolf Theatre in Chicago in 2023–24. The play is a family drama revealing the members of the black, politically prominent Jasper family. It transferred to Broadway for the 2024–25 season at the Hayes Theater, and won the 2025 Tony Award for Best Play. In addition, five of the six actors received Tony Award nominations. It won the 2025 Pulitzer Prize for Drama.

== Synopsis ==
The fictional Jasper family, a prominent African-American family based in Chicago, reunite under the same roof under auspicious circumstances. Revelations occur as the parents and two grown sons (and partner/friends) attempt to define their value to each other and their identity within black culture and politics.

The family is composed of Solomon Jasper, a septuagenarian reverend and prominent activist from the Civil Rights Movement; his wife Claudine, a prim matriarch; older son Solomon "Junior", a state senator who was imprisoned for embezzlement and has a recent diagnosis of bipolar disorder; younger son Nazareth "Naz", a nature photographer and the narrator; and Junior's wife Morgan, a woman of humble beginnings who is about to serve time for the family's tax fraud. Junior and Morgan also have twin sons, one of whom is neurodivergent; both boys are with their maternal grandmother during the play's events. Also in the mix is Aziza, a social worker and Naz's friend from Harlem.

=== Act One ===
Naz informs the audience that he has just returned from a photography trip in the Canadian wilderness. He had met his friend Aziza at a hotel in Niagara Falls, as he had previously agreed to become her sperm donor. After Naz missed his flight, Aziza agreed to drive him to Chicago.

The family is gathering to celebrate Claudine's birthday and Junior's return from prison. Solomon, who has recently taken up beekeeping, remains distant from Naz. Aziza returns to drop off Naz's phone charger. Previously unaware of Naz's family background, she is delighted to meet Solomon and Claudine, who invite her to stay the night because of an oncoming snowstorm. She agrees, despite Naz's objections.

The Jaspers sit down for dinner, where Aziza and Naz are questioned about the state of their relationship. Eventually, Aziza admits she is a lesbian and the recipient of Naz's sperm, shocking the family. She tries to encourage them to accept Naz's asexuality. Junior presents Claudine with a book compiling the letters she had sent him in prison and announces a plan to become an advocate for prison reform. This triggers a large argument: Solomon considers Junior's comfortable prison experience for white-collar crime an embarrassment; he also scolds Claudine for allowing "deceit" to proliferate in the family. Morgan, until now the recipient of Claudine's passive-aggressive sniping, angrily threatens to expose the family's secrets and is struck by Claudine before returning to her room.

=== Act Two ===
Naz and Aziza argue about her decision to reveal their situation to the Jaspers. She presses him about Morgan's suspicion that he is autistic, angering him further, and she absconds for the rest of the night. Junior admits to Naz that Morgan is pressuring him to accept a payout for an exposé on their family. She has also smuggled plenty of anxiety pills in her luggage; Junior suspects either an upcoming suicide or poisoning attempt, but is unwilling to confront her. Meanwhile, Claudine and Solomon worry about the informality of Naz's sperm donation, and ask for his aid in convincing Aziza to sign a non-disclosure agreement. Solomon tells Naz that he has decided to reach out to Erica, a woman claiming to be his daughter.

Later, Naz overhears a conversation between a drunk Junior and Claudine about Morgan's scheming. Junior drunkenly reveals to Naz that he and Claudine had been working to bury claims from people claiming to be Solomon's illegitimate children, but could not disappear Erica. He breaks down and admits he would be relieved if Morgan died. Naz agrees to speak with his sister-in-law. Morgan confides her frustrations in the marriage and how her life will be destroyed by her prison time. Because her prenup will leave her penniless if she divorces Junior; she asks for Naz to testify on her behalf but he declines.

The next morning, Aziza and Morgan plan to leave the house early, but are prevented from doing so. In explaining her decision to have a child, Aziza is able to relate her experiences as a Black Lives Matter activist to Solomon and Claudine's work for civil rights. However, she also announces her decision to pursue another sperm donor due to the family's dysfunction and potential history of neurodiversity, offending the Jaspers.

Junior excitedly enters the house brandishing the honey from Solomon's hives. However, Solomon is infuriated as Junior has harvested all the honey, leaving the bees to starve during the winter. Another argument commences; Junior returns to the basement and a gunshot from Solomon's hunting rifle is heard. A terrified Naz and Morgan run to the basement; to the family's immense relief, Junior survived. In the chaos, Naz begs Aziza to accept his family's legal intervention, and she agrees.

An exhausted Naz later awakens to find the rest of the characters gone save for his father. The two have a long conversation about religion, Naz's decision to leave divinity school, and Solomon's legacy and sense of purpose.

Naz explains to the audience that after her stint in prison Morgan left Junior and got what she wanted in the divorce, including full custody of their children. Solomon maintains a relationship with Erica. Aziza bore a son, but Naz is unsure if the child is his as the two no longer speak. He closes the play by musing about the various possibilities.

== Notable casts ==
Character	Chicago 2024	Broadway 2025
Nazareth "Naz" Jasper	Jon Michael Hill	Jon Michael Hill
Claudine Jasper	Tamara Tunie	LaTanya Richardson Jackson
Solomon "Sonny" Jasper	Harry Lennix	Harry Lennix
Morgan Jasper	Alana Arenas	Alana Arenas
Solomon "Junior" Jasper	Glenn Davis	Glenn Davis
Aziza	Ayanna Bria Bakari	Kara Young

== Production history ==
The play was commissioned by the Steppenwolf Theatre Company and was workshopped in 2019 at the Colorado New Play Festival in Steamboat Springs, Colorado. After additional readings and workshops, the play premiered as part of Steppenwolf's 2023–2024 season on March 14 – April 28, directed by Phylicia Rashad with associate director Tyrone Phillips.

The production transferred to Broadway at the Helen Hayes Theatre as part of the 2024–2025 Broadway season, with producers David Stone, Debra Martin Chase, Marc Platt, LaChanze, Rashad Chambers, Aaron Glick and Steppenwolf Theatre Company. The production was not part of Second Stage Theater's season.

== Reception ==
The production received positive reviews when it debuted at the Steppenwolf Theatre. Chris Jones of The Chicago Tribune described it as "explosive" dissection of the legacy of Jesse Jackson and his son Jesse Jackson Jr. amidst the latter's 2012 arrest and conviction for campaign fraud. Jones also compared it to the Tracy Letts plays August: Osage County and The Minutes but added, "Purpose is its own thing, a brilliant moralistic satire, which sounds deadly but not with a writer who prizes agency, currency and, thank god, ambiguity".

== Accolades ==
Year	Award	Category	Nominated work	Result	Ref.
2025	Pulitzer Prize for Drama		Branden Jacobs-Jenkins	Won	
2025	Tony Awards	Best Play	Branden Jacobs-Jenkins	Won	
2025	Tony Awards	Best Actor in a Play	Jon Michael Hill	Nominated	
2025	Tony Awards	Best Actor in a Play	Harry Lennix	Nominated	
2025	Tony Awards	Best Actress in a Play	LaTanya Richardson Jackson	Nominated	
2025	Tony Awards	Best Featured Actor in a Play	Glenn Davis	Nominated	
2025	Tony Awards	Best Featured Actress in a Play	Kara Young	Won	
2025	Drama Desk Awards	Outstanding Play	Purpose	Won	
2025	Drama Desk Awards	Outstanding Featured Performance in a Play	Kara Young	Won	
2025	Drama League Awards	Outstanding Production of a Play	Purpose	Nominated	
2025	Drama League Awards	Distinguished Performance	LaTanya Richardson Jackson	Nominated	
2025	Drama League Awards	Distinguished Performance	Kara Young	Nominated	
2025	Outer Critics Circle Awards	Outstanding New Broadway Play	Purpose	Nominated	
2025	Outer Critics Circle Awards	Outstanding Lead Performer in a Broadway Play	Jon Michael Hill	Nominated	
2025	Outer Critics Circle Awards	Outstanding Featured Performer in a Broadway Play	LaTanya Richardson Jackson	Nominated	
2025	Outer Critics Circle Awards	Outstanding Featured Performer in a Broadway Play	Kara Young	Nominated	
2025	Outer Critics Circle Awards	Outstanding Direction of a Play	Phylicia Rashad	Nominated	
2025	New York Drama Critics' Circle Award		Branden Jacobs-Jenkins	Won	
2025	American Theatre Critics Association Award	Harold and Mimi Steinberg/ATCA New Play Award	Branden Jacobs-Jenkins	Won	
