= Downstate (play) =

2018 tragicomedy by Bruce Norris

- 2018 Steppenwolf Theatre production poster
- Original language: English
- Written by: Bruce Norris
- Characters: Fred; Andy; Em; Dee; Ivy; Felix; Gio; Effie
- Genre: Drama

Premiere
- Date: September 20, 2018
- Place: Steppenwolf Theatre

Downstate is a 2018 tragicomedy play by Bruce Norris about a group house for sex offenders. It premiered at Steppenwolf Theatre in Chicago and has received acclaim from critics, as well as criticism from conservatives who have accused it of promoting pedophilia. The play has since been produced on the West End in 2019, Off-Broadway in 2022, Washington, D.C. in 2025, and Broadway in 2026. The acting edition of the play is published by Theatrical Rights Worldwide.

== Plot ==
Four men who have been convicted of sex offenses and completed their prison sentences but remain on the sex offender registry live in a group home in downstate Illinois in the present: Fred, a former piano teacher who molested and raped students; Dee, a former musical theater performer who had a relationship with a 14-year old cast mate, for which he is unapologetic; Gio, who was convicted of statutory rape but claims to be better than the others as he did not knowingly commit a crime; and Felix, who molested his preteen daughter. Fred is confronted by his former student Andy and the latter's wife, Em, when they come to visit to deliver a letter speaking their piece on how they think of him. Fred comes off as apologetic and the couple departs, but Andy leaves behind his phone. The men learn from their probation officer, Ivy, that a no-go zone around a school has been expanded, threatening their access to a supermarket. Ivy also speaks to Felix, who reveals that he violated his parole by using a computer in a public library to see pictures of his daughter on Facebook, meaning he will likely have to return to prison.

When Andy returns to pick up his phone, he and Fred have another conversation. Fred, who uses a wheelchair, explains that he was beaten by a "vigilante" while in prison. Gio returns with his co-worker Effie, who appears suspiciously young. Andy then asks Fred to sign a confession, which includes details about having been raped. However, Fred denies having done so, affirming while he molested Andy, it was a different victim whom he had raped and Andy is misremembering. Andy demands that Fred confess, but Dee challenges Andy by asking him if Fred is circumcised, since Dee has been helping Fred into the bath. Andy does not reply and takes the document. Dee then continues to antagonize Andy by suggesting he enjoyed the abuse, leading Andy to smash a lamp with a baseball bat and punch Fred. The fight is quickly stopped when the residents discover Felix hanged himself from a ceiling fan in his room.

In the aftermath, after Felix's body has been removed, Andy is arrested for assaulting Fred, Effie is arrested under suspicion of underage alcohol possession, and Gio is arrested for potentially violating the terms of his release by interacting with Effie. Em returns and bluntly tells Fred and Dee that Felix made the right decision, and that none of them have received the full punishment they deserve. Left alone in the living room, Dee and Fred try to move on with their daily routine, but are left reeling at the events of the previous night.

== Characters and original casts ==
- Fred, a genial former piano teacher who raped two of his students
- Andy, one of Fred's former students, now an adult and father
- Em, Andy's assertive wife
- Dee, a charismatic former performer who had a sexual relationship with a 14-year-old boy
- Ivy, the offenders' probation officer
- Felix, a shy Hispanic man who molested his preteen daughter
- Gio, a smarmy 30-something who committed statutory rape
- Effie, Gio's girlfriend

Role	Chicago (2018)	London (2019)	Off-Broadway (2022)	Broadway (2026)
Gio	Glenn Davis	Glenn Davis	Glenn Davis	Al'Jaleel McGhee
Dee	K. Todd Freeman	K. Todd Freeman	K. Todd Freeman	K. Todd Freeman
Fred	Francis Guinan	Francis Guinan	Francis Guinan	Francis Guinan
Ivy	Cecilia Noble	Cecilia Noble	Susanna Guzman	Liza Colón-Zayas
Andy	Tim Hopper	Tim Hopper	Tim Hopper	Thomas Sadoski
Em	Matilda Ziegler	Matilda Ziegler	Sally Murphy	Cassie Beck
Effie	Aimee Lou Wood	Aimee Lou Wood	Gabi Samels	Ivy Wolk
Felix	Eddie Torres	Eddie Torres	Eddie Torres	Adrian Martinez

=== Notable replacements ===
==== 2022 Playwrights Horizons ====
- Andy: Brian Hutchison

== Productions ==
=== Chicago and London premiere (2018 & 2019) ===
The play premiered Steppenwolf Theatre Company in Chicago in 2018, running from September 20 to November 18 in a co-production with the Royal National Theatre of England. Directed by Pam MacKinnon, the production starred K. Todd Freeman as Dee, Glenn Davis as Gio and Francis Guinan as Fred, amid a joint American-British ensemble cast. The production received mixed reviews, with The Chicago Sun Times calling it "unsettling if not enlightening," though criticized it as "provocative but uneven." Steppenwolf had to hire additional security for its run after it received threats.

The Steppenwolf production transferred to the National Theatre in London in 2019, running from March 12, 2019 through April 27 of the same year. MacKinnon returned as director, along with the show's cast, and the show received largely positive reviews. The Guardian praised the show as a "viscerally acted drama" and lauded the "visceral power to the performances."

=== Off-Broadway production (2022) ===
Following the COVID-19 pandemic, the play premiered Off-Broadway at Playwrights Horizons in 2022, directed again by MacKinnon with Guinan, Freeman, Davis, Hopper, and Torres reprising their roles. The production ran from October 28, 2022 through January 7, 2023, and received positive reviews. The New York Times again praised the production, calling it "impeccably acted" and lauded the show's "bruised and banged-up humanity."

=== Washington, D.C. production (2025) ===
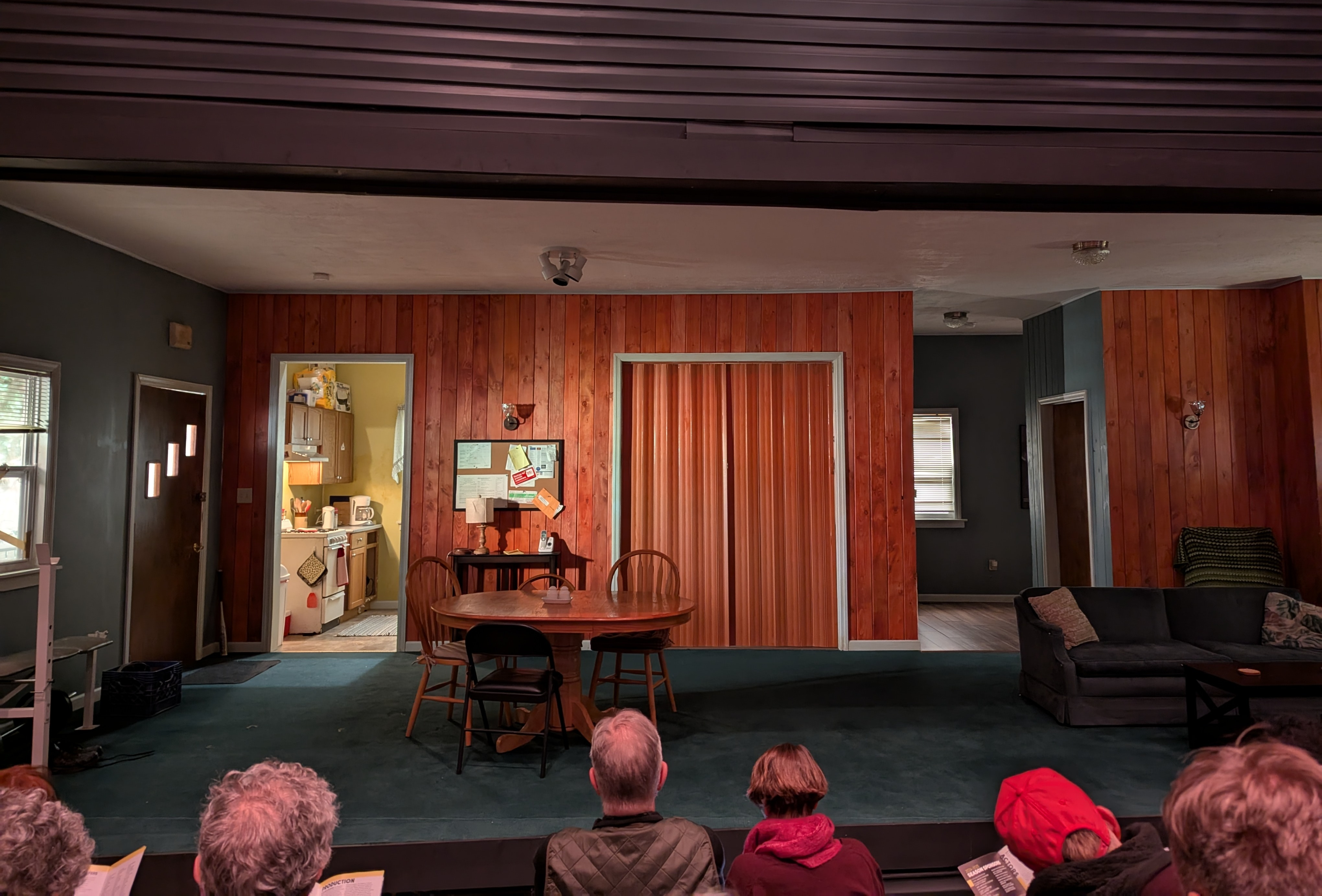
Set of the Studio Theatre production

The play was subsequently produced in 2025 at Studio Theatre in Washington, D.C. Directed by David Muse, the production starred Stephen Conrad Moore as Dee, Jaysen Wright as Gio and Dan Daily as Fred, amid an ensemble cast. The production received strong reviews, with The Washington Post calling it "outstandingly executed" and DC Theater Arts praising the "superb performances from the ensemble."

=== Broadway production (2026) ===
A new production, directed by Joe Mantello and produced by Scott Rudin, is planned to open on Broadway at the Booth Theatre, with previews starting October 17 and opening night set for November 25. The production will include K. Todd Freeman and Francis Guinan reprising their roles from the Steppenwolf production; they will be joined by Cassie Beck, Adrian Martinez, Al'Jaleel McGhee, Thomas Sadoski, Ivy Wolk, and Liza Colón-Zayas.

== Reception ==
The play has received near-universal acclaim from established critics, but attracted criticism from conservatives online. Jesse Green designated the 2018 production a critic's pick for The New York Times. He wrote: "Downstate is finally about the anarchic spirit of revenge, so understandable and yet so antithetical to justice. Mr. Norris is warning us to consider what may follow in the wake of even a healthy purging if the avengers are just as abusive as the abusers. It’s a lot to stomach, and rightly so." Michael Billington rated the 2019 production four out of five stars for The Guardian, praising the "visceral power to the performances". However, he criticized the character of Andy as overwritten. It was nominated for best play at the 65th Evening Standard Theatre Awards.

Avatar of Ted Cruz

Ted Cruz
Twitter
@tedcruz

So now the corporate media is praising pedophilia….

Nov 28, 2022

Avatar of The Washington Post

The Washington Post
Twitter
@washingtonpost

Review: “Downstate” is a play about pedophiles. It’s also brilliant. https://wapo.st/3EFrt3A

Nov 27, 2022

Laura Collins-Hughes designated the 2022 production a Times critic's pick, writing, "This deep, dark tragicomedy pokes and prods at our compassion, checks the pulse on our sense of justice, taps our reflex response to charm." Peter Marks described it The Washington Post as "a stunning demonstration of the power of narrative art to tackle a taboo". Conservative Twitter users criticized the play and Marks's review. U.S. Senator Ted Cruz (who is not known to have seen the play) tweeted, "So now the corporate media is praising pedophilia". Playbill characterized the criticism as part of a conservative panic about pedophilia as a facet of its opposition to LGBTQ rights.

In 2023, Downstate won the New York Drama Critics' Circle award for best play. The following year, it won the Obie Award for playwriting. Covering the 2025 production for the Post, Naveen Kumar wrote, "it’s tempting to say Norris goes too far in trying to humanize characters who have done despicable things, and I wouldn’t blame anyone for saying so. But what he achieves here is more sophisticated than that, tugging at the threads of our moral convictions until they’re all tangled up at our feet."

== Awards and nominations ==
Year	Award	Category	Nominee	Result	Ref.
2023	Drama Desk Awards	Outstanding Featured Performance in a Play	Francis Guinan	Nominated	
2023	Drama Desk Awards	Outstanding Featured Performance in a Play	K. Todd Freeman	Nominated	
2023	Outer Critics Circle Awards	Outstanding New Off-Broadway Play		Won	
2023	Outer Critics Circle Awards	Outstanding Featured Performer in an Off-Broadway Play	Glenn Davis	Nominated	
2023	Outer Critics Circle Awards	Outstanding Featured Performer in an Off-Broadway Play	Francis Guinan	Nominated	
2023	Outer Critics Circle Awards	Outstanding Featured Performer in an Off-Broadway Play	K. Todd Freeman	Won	
2023	Outer Critics Circle Awards	Outstanding Director of a Play	Pam MacKinnon	Nominated	
2023	Lucille Lortel Awards	Outstanding Play		Nominated	
2023	Lucille Lortel Awards	Outstanding Lead Performer in a Play	K. Todd Freeman	Won	
2023	Lucille Lortel Awards	Outstanding Featured Performer in a Play	Suzanna Guzmán	Nominated	
2023	Lucille Lortel Awards	Outstanding Featured Performer in a Play	Eddie Torres	Nominated	
2023	Drama League Awards	Outstanding Production of a Play		Nominated	
2023	Drama League Awards	Distinguished Performance	K. Todd Freeman	Nominated	
2023	New York Drama Critics' Circle	Best Play		Won	
2023	Obie Awards	Playwrighting	Bruce Norris	Won	
2023	Obie Awards	Sustained Achievement in Direction	Pam MacKinnon	Won	
2023	Obie Awards	Sustained Achievement in Performance	K. Todd Freeman	Won	
