= Baltimore Community Foundation =

American non-profit organization

Baltimore Community Foundation, Inc.

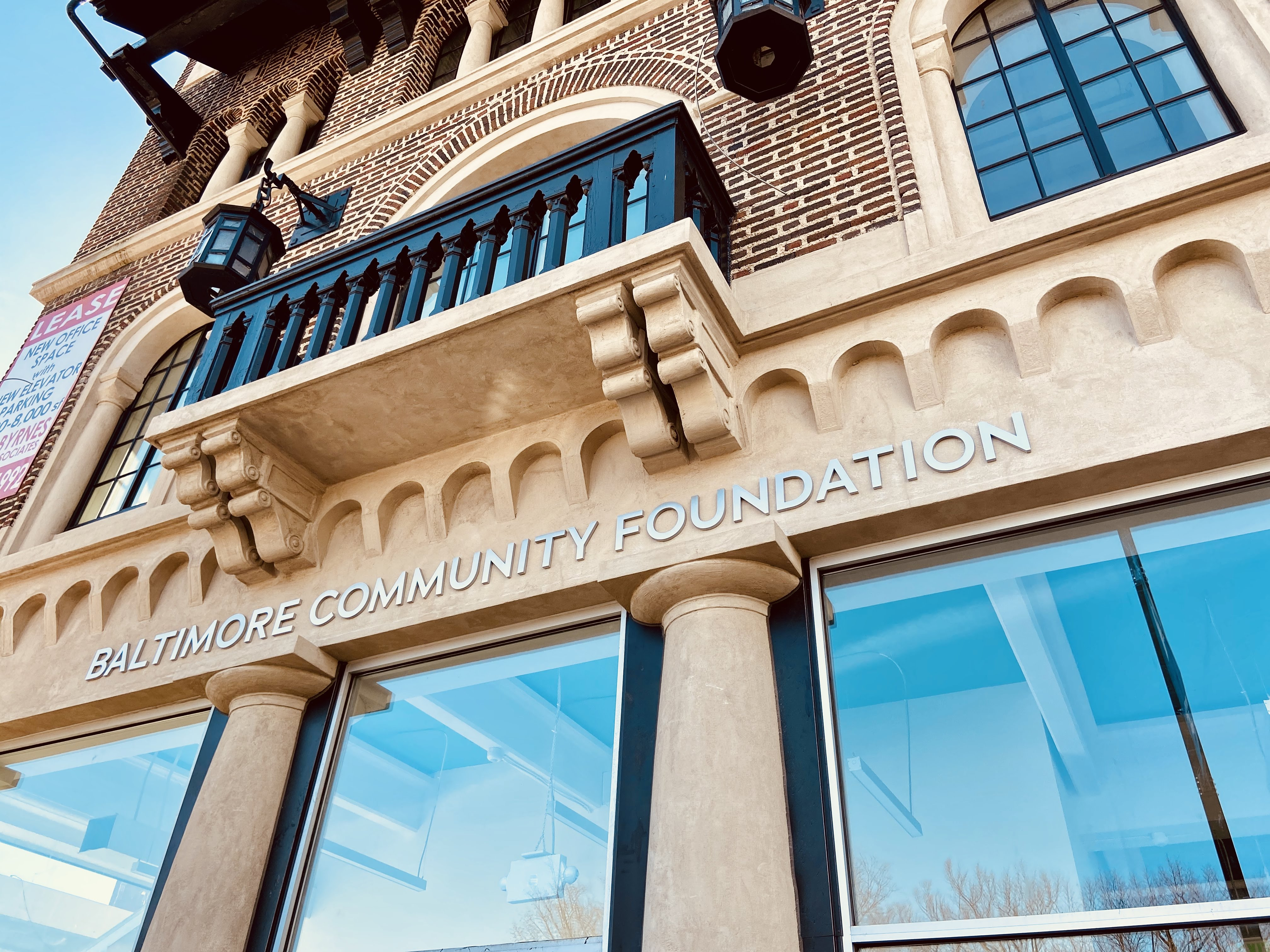
- Headquarters
- Formation: 1972
- Type: Non-Profit Community Foundation
- Tax ID no.: 23-7180620
- Location: Baltimore, Maryland
- Coordinates: 39.2998027°N 76.615487°W
- Region served: Greater Baltimore, Maryland
- Method: Donations and Grants
- Key people: David Clapp (Chair); Shanaysha Sauls (President & CEO)
- Staff: 32
- Website: www.bcf.org
- Member of the Maryland Association of Nonprofit Organizations

The Baltimore Community Foundation (BCF) is a community foundation created by and for the people of Baltimore to serve the current and future needs of Greater Baltimore. BCF's mission is to inspire donors to achieve their charitable goals from generation to generation and to improve the quality of life in the Baltimore region through grantmaking, civic leadership and strategic investments.

With assets over $350 million and more than 900 charitable funds created by individuals, families, and corporations, BCF has granted more than $737 million since 2001 and made additional contributions since its inception in 1972, making it one of the Baltimore region’s top grantmaking foundations. In addition to managing donor-advised funds, BCF makes grants and impact investments, and advocates for policies to improve public education and quality of life in Baltimore neighborhoods. Its role as an advocate was highlighted in FSG Social Impact Advisors’ 2009 report, Raising Money While Raising Hell.

== History ==
In 1972, leaders of Baltimore's five major banks joined to establish the Community Foundation of the Greater Baltimore Area. Inspired by the success of the nation's first community foundation in Cleveland, Ohio, and a rapidly growing network of community foundations nationwide. Co-founder Robert Levi of Mercantile-Safe Deposit and Trust, the fledgling organization's first chairman, felt strongly that Baltimore needed “a philanthropic organization that was a gathering of all people—no color line, no religious affiliation, no special cause.”

== Governance ==
BCF is governed by a 30-member board of trustees, selected to represent diverse community interests. Its staff includes professionals in community investment, donor services, development, finance and administration, and communications.

== Initiatives ==
A number of key initiatives of the Baltimore Community Foundation are:

- Donor Services, providing customized charitable giving guidance for individual, family, corporate and public entities.
- Grantmaking focused on strengthening schools and neighborhoods.
- Impact Investing in projects that provide a financial return and social and economic benefits.
- Cultivating civic leadership among Baltimore's business community.
- Advocacy for equity in public education including the Blueprint for Maryland's Future. BCF CEO Dr. Shanaysha Sauls was appointed to chair the Blueprint Accountability and Implementation Board nominating committee that will oversee the law's roll-out.
- Special Initiatives
  - Central Maryland Transportation Alliance is a coalition of Greater Baltimore's business, environmental and community leaders dedicated to improving travel efficiency in Central Maryland.
  - BCF is the home of three giving circles: Baltimore Women's Giving Circle, Black Philanthropy Circle, and the Quality of Life Giving Circle.
