= Grand Rapids Civic Theatre =

Theater and former movie theater in Grand Rapids, Michigan, United States

Coordinates: 42.96417°N 85.66766°W

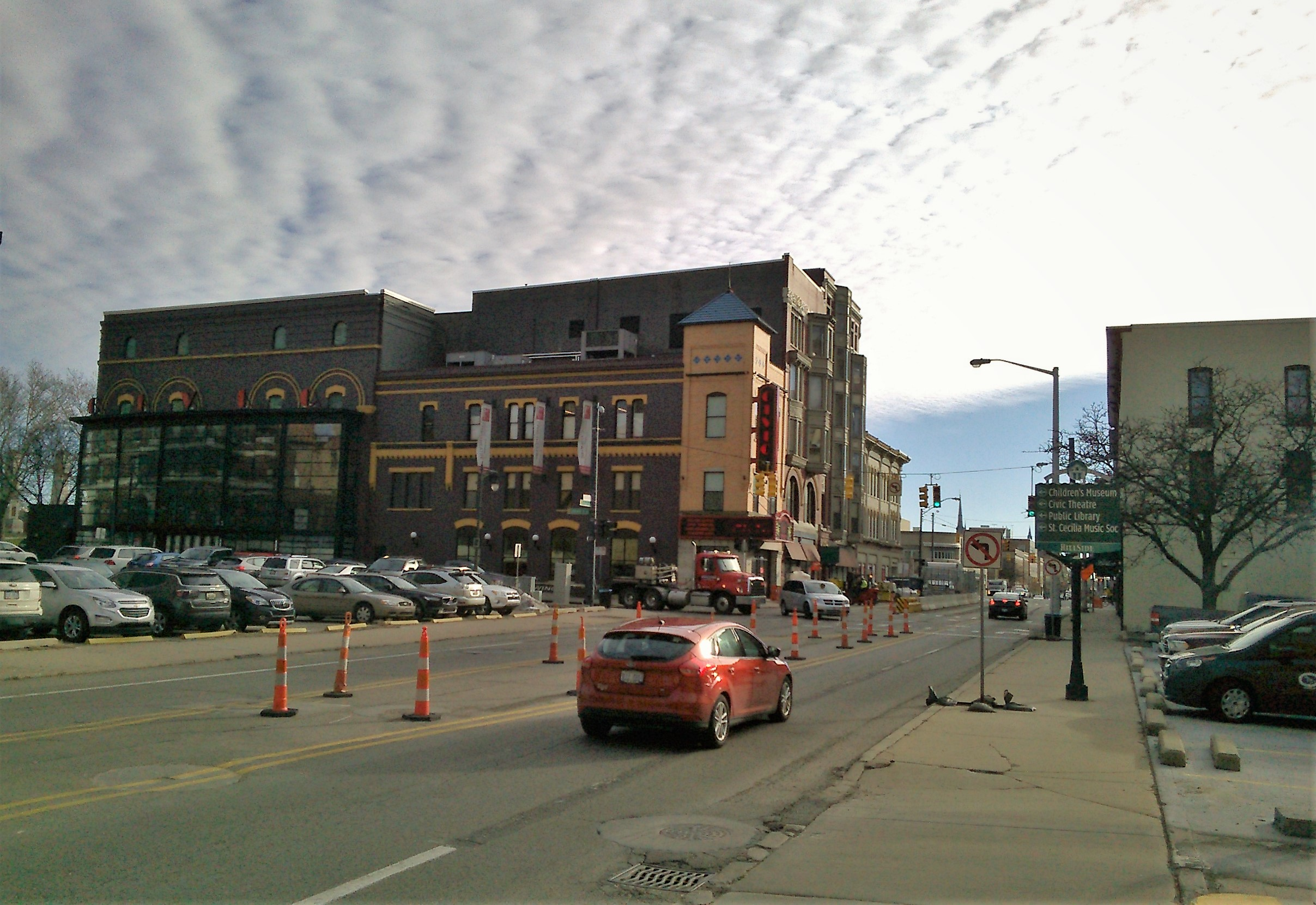
Image of Grand Rapids Civic Theatre & School of Theatre Arts

Grand Rapids Civic Theatre & School of Theatre Arts, located in Grand Rapids, Michigan, was founded in 1925 and has grown into one of the largest community theatres in the United States. Grand Rapids Civic Theatre & School of Theatre Arts is located in downtown Grand Rapids in an 80,000-square-foot (7,400 m^{2}) facility consisting of four historic buildings: the Majestic Theatre (1903); the Hull Building (1890); the Botsford Building (1892); and the Wenham Building (1878).

In the 2000s, the theater underwent a significant renovation project. In 2005, Fred Meijer, chairman emeritus of the Meijer grocery chain, announced his support as the lead donor to help save the theatre building. In 2006, a considerable facility renovation led and managed by Grand Action invested over 10 million dollars in the theatre's four historic buildings. In the fall of 2006, Civic Theatre's artistic home was renamed the Meijer Majestic Theatre in honor of Fred and Lena Meijer's lead gift to this project. The theatre is completing the project with a $2.3 million endowment and theatrical equipment campaign.

The theatre creates over a dozen productions and 15,000 hours of educational instruction annually. These programs are made possible by over 700 volunteers under the leadership of 9 professional staff and over 30 guest artists.
