= Steppenwolf Theatre Company =

Theatre company in Chicago, Illinois, US

Coordinates: 41°54′45″N 87°38′55″W

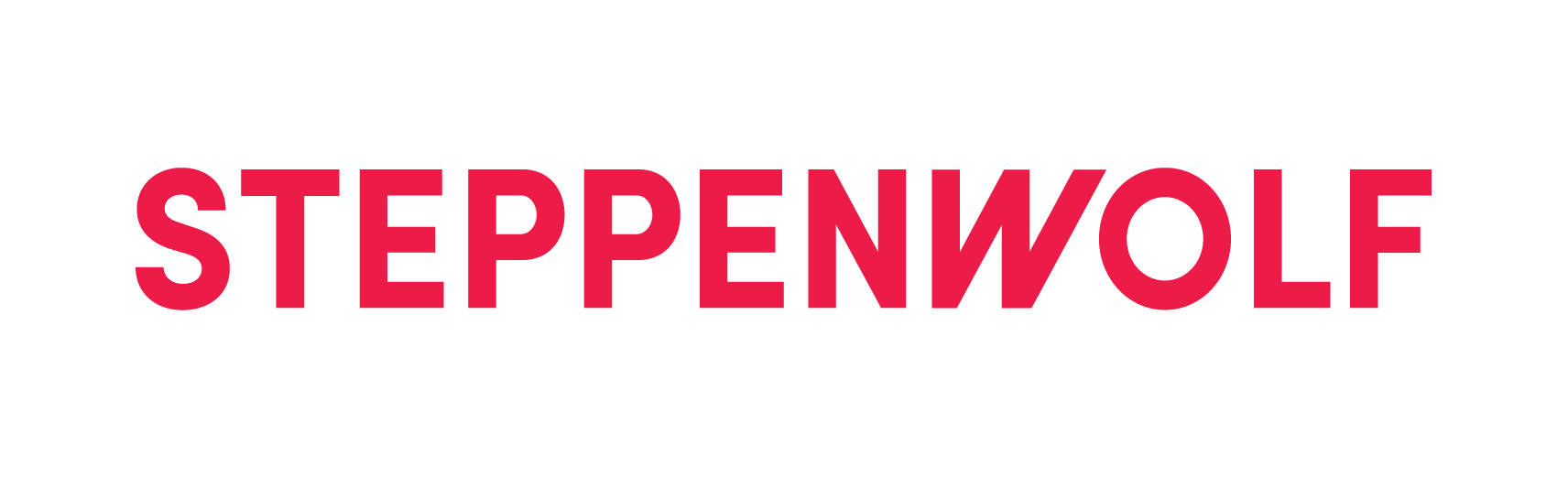

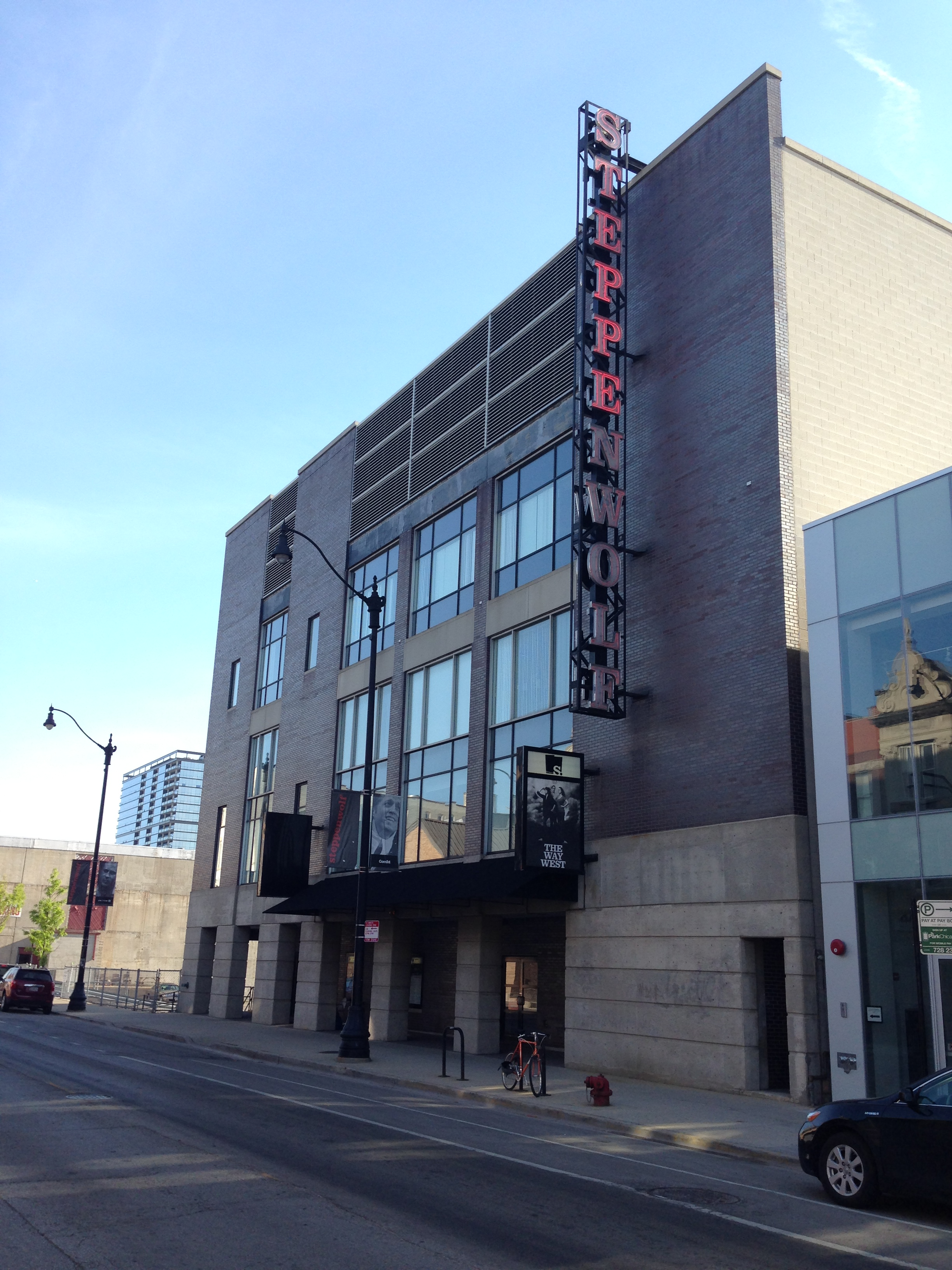
- Steppenwolf Theatre Chicago
- Interactive map of Steppenwolf Theatre Company
- Address: 1650 N Halsted St; Chicago; United States
- Capacity: 894

Construction
- Opened: 1974

Website
- steppenwolf.org

Steppenwolf Theatre Company is a Chicago theater company founded in 1974 by Terry Kinney, Jeff Perry, and Gary Sinise in the Immaculate Conception grade school in Highland Park, Illinois and is now located in Chicago's Lincoln Park neighborhood on Halsted Street. After occupying several theatres in Chicago, in 1991, it moved into its own purpose-built complex with three performing spaces, the largest seating 550.

The theatre's name comes from Hermann Hesse's novel Steppenwolf, which original member Rick Argosh was reading during the company's inaugural production of Paul Zindel's play, And Miss Reardon Drinks a Little, in 1974. A recipient of the Regional Tony Award, it has produced several shows that have transferred to Broadway.

== History ==
=== Founding ===
The name Steppenwolf Theatre Company was first used in 1974 at a Unitarian church on Half Day Road in Deerfield. The company presented And Miss Reardon Drinks a Little by Paul Zindel, Rosencrantz and Guildenstern Are Dead by Tom Stoppard, and The Glass Menagerie by Tennessee Williams, with Rick Argosh directing, and Grease by Jim Jacobs and Warren Casey, with Gary Sinise directing.

The founding members are Terry Kinney, Jeff Perry, and Gary Sinise. The founders recruited six additional members: H. E. Baccus, Nancy Evans, Moira Harris, John Malkovich, Laurie Metcalf, and Alan Wilder.

=== 1975–1990 ===
In 1975, Steppenwolf incorporated as a nonprofit organization, saving money by taking the name of a failed theatre company that had already incorporated. In the summer of 1976, Steppenwolf took up residence in a vacant basement space of the Immaculate Conception Catholic Church in Highland Park, Illinois and produced its first full season of plays.

In 1980, the theatre company moved into a 134-seat theatre at the Jane Addams Hull House Center on Broadway Avenue in Chicago. Two years later, the company moved to a 211-seat facility at 2851 N. Halsted Street, which was their home until 1991, when construction was completed on the current theatre complex at 1650 N. Halsted Street (with administrative offices at 1700 N. Halsted Street.) The theatre has three theatres: the Downstairs Theatre that seats 515; the Upstairs Theatre that seats 299; and, the 1700 Theatre, a casual, intimate and flexible theatre that seats 80.

In 1982, the Sam Shepard play True West, starring Sinise and John Malkovich, was the first of many Steppenwolf productions to travel to New York City.

=== 1990–present ===
In 1994, the company made its Los Angeles debut with Steve Martin's first play, Picasso at the Lapin Agile.

In 1996, after successful runs in Chicago and New York, Lyle Kessler's Orphans, directed by Gary Sinise, was the first Steppenwolf production to go international, debuting in London.

The MacArthur Foundation awarded Steppenwolf Theatre Company $2.26 million between 1978 and 2017, in support of general operations, and growth of artistic and educational programs.

In 2019, True West opened again at Steppenwolf, for the first time in 37 years, with Namir Smallwood and Jon Michael Hill as the leads and the direction of Randall Arney.

== Ensemble ==
Steppenwolf is an ensemble cast theatre company with actors, playwrights, producers, and directors in its membership. Notable past and present ensemble members include:

- Joan Allen
- Kevin Anderson
- Alana Arenas
- Randall Arney
- Kate Arrington
- H. E. Baccus (original member)
- Ian Barford
- Robert Breuler
- Cliff Chamberlain
- Gary Cole
- Carrie Coon
- Celeste M. Cooper
- Glenn Davis
- Kathryn Erbe
- Nancy Evans (original member)
- Dennis Farina
- Jim Fitzpatrick
- Audrey Francis
- K. Todd Freeman
- Frank Galati
- Laura Glenn
- Francis Guinan
- Moira Harris (original member)
- Glenne Headly
- Jon Michael Hill
- Tim Hopper
- Tom Irwin
- Ora Jones
- Rajiv Joseph
- Terry Kinney (Founder)
- Tina Landau
- Martha Lavey
- Tracy Letts
- John Mahoney
- John Malkovich (original member)
- Sandra Marquez
- Mariann Mayberry
- James Vincent Meredith
- Laurie Metcalf (original member)
- Tarell Alvin McCraney
- Amy Morton
- Sally Murphy
- Caroline Neff
- Bruce Norris
- Austin Pendleton
- Jeff Perry (Founder)
- William Petersen
- Martha Plimpton
- Rondi Reed
- Molly Regan
- John C. Reilly
- Karen Rodriguez
- Anna D. Shapiro
- Eric Simonson
- Gary Sinise (Founder)
- Namir Smallwood
- Rick Snyder
- Lois Smith
- Jim True-Frost
- Alan Wilder (original member)

== Productions ==
Notable productions include:

- Airline Highway by Lisa D'Amour
- Who's Afraid of Virginia Woolf? by Edward Albee (Starring Tracy Letts and Amy Morton)
- Clybourne Park by Bruce Norris
- August: Osage County by Tracy Letts
- True West by Sam Shepard
- Lydie Breeze directed by H.E. Baccus
- Balm in Gilead by Lanford Wilson, directed by John Malkovich
- And a Nightingale Sang by C. P. Taylor
- Orphans by Lyle Kessler
- Coyote Ugly (1985) by Lynn Seifert, directed by John Malkovich
- Burn This by Lanford Wilson
- The Grapes of Wrath adapted by company member Frank Galati
- King James by company member Rajiv Joseph
- Purpose by Branden Jacobs-Jenkins

== Critical reception ==
Through its New Plays Initiative, the company maintains ongoing relationships with writers of international prominence while continuing to support the work of aspiring and mid-career playwrights. In 1988, Steppenwolf presented the world premiere of Frank Galati's adaptation of The Grapes of Wrath, based on the John Steinbeck novel, which eventually went on to win the Tony Award for Best Play. In 2000, Steppenwolf presented the world premiere of Austin Pendleton's Orson's Shadow, which subsequently was staged off-Broadway and by regional theatres throughout the country.

Tracy Letts' Broadway drama August: Osage County (2007) was ranked number one in Time's Top Ten Theatre Performances of 2007. After moving from the Imperial Theatre next door to The Music Box Theatre for an open-ended run, August: Osage County won five Tony Awards including Best Play of 2007, Best Director (Anna D. Shapiro), Best Leading Actress (Deanna Dunagan), Best Featured Actress (Rondi Reed), and Best Scenic Design (Todd Rosenthal). Letts went on to win the 2008 Pulitzer Prize for Drama for his play.

Among the theatre's many honours are the Tony Award for Regional Theatre Excellence (1985) and the National Medal of Arts (1998).

== See also ==
- Theater in Chicago
- List of museums and cultural institutions in Chicago
