= Robert Levi =

Rober H. Levi
- Education: Bachelor's Degree
- Alma mater: Johns Hopkins University

Rober H. Levi (1916–1995) was a prominent Baltimore businessman and philanthropist. He was president of the Hecht's department store chain at the time of its merger with the May Department Stores Company in 1958.

== Early life and education ==
Born in Baltimore in 1916, Levi attended City College of Baltimore, where he served as the captain of a champion lacrosse team for two years. In 1960, he was inducted in the City College Hall of Fame for the accomplishments he achieved while a student. Granted a full scholarship, he then went on to pursue a bachelor's degree in economics and play lacrosse at Johns Hopkins University, where he received his diploma in 1936.

== Marriage and career ==
Levi married Ryda Hecht in 1939. His wife was the daughter of Alexander Hecht, who owned the Hecht's department store chain. After starting work at Hecht's in 1942, Levi rose through the ranks of the company to become the chairman and president of the Hecht Department Stores in the Baltimore-Washington area in 1955.

In 1958, he negotiated the merger between Hecht's and the May Department Stores Company, then served as the vice-president of the May Company and chairman of its Hecht's division until retiring from the company in 1967. Later, Levi joined the Mercantile Trust and Deposit Company, serving as chairman of the banks executive committee until retiring in 1985.

== Charitable work ==
Robert Levi also well known for contributions to his community. He led the Sinai Hospital Building campaign in the 1950s, served as a trustee of Goucher College, acted as treasurer and trustee of the Walters Art Museum, directed Associated Jewish Charities, and headed the Federal City Council and the National Capital Downtown Committee in Washington, D.C.

In 1972, along with the leaders of four other major banks in Baltimore, Levi co-founded the Baltimore Community Foundation. He served as the foundation's first chairman, ensuring the city would always have “a philanthropic organization that was a gathering of all people—no color line, no religious affiliation, no special cause.”

For 31 years, he served as a trustee of Johns Hopkins University and Hospital. Levi was also an active part of the Greater Baltimore Committee, which worked to revitalize the city through projects such as the Inner Harbor, Oriole Park at Camden Yards, and the Jones Falls Expressway.

The Levi Sculpture Garden at the Baltimore Museum of Art bears his legacy and is the result of his donation of 14 sculptures and funding from the City of Baltimore and the State of Maryland. The garden highlights pieces from the second half of the twentieth-century including works by Louise Nevelson, Joan Miró, George Rickey, and Alexander Calder Jose de Rivera, Jim Dine, Ellsworth Kelly, Isamu Noguchi, and Scott Burton.
