= Jeremy Shamos =

American actor (born 1970)

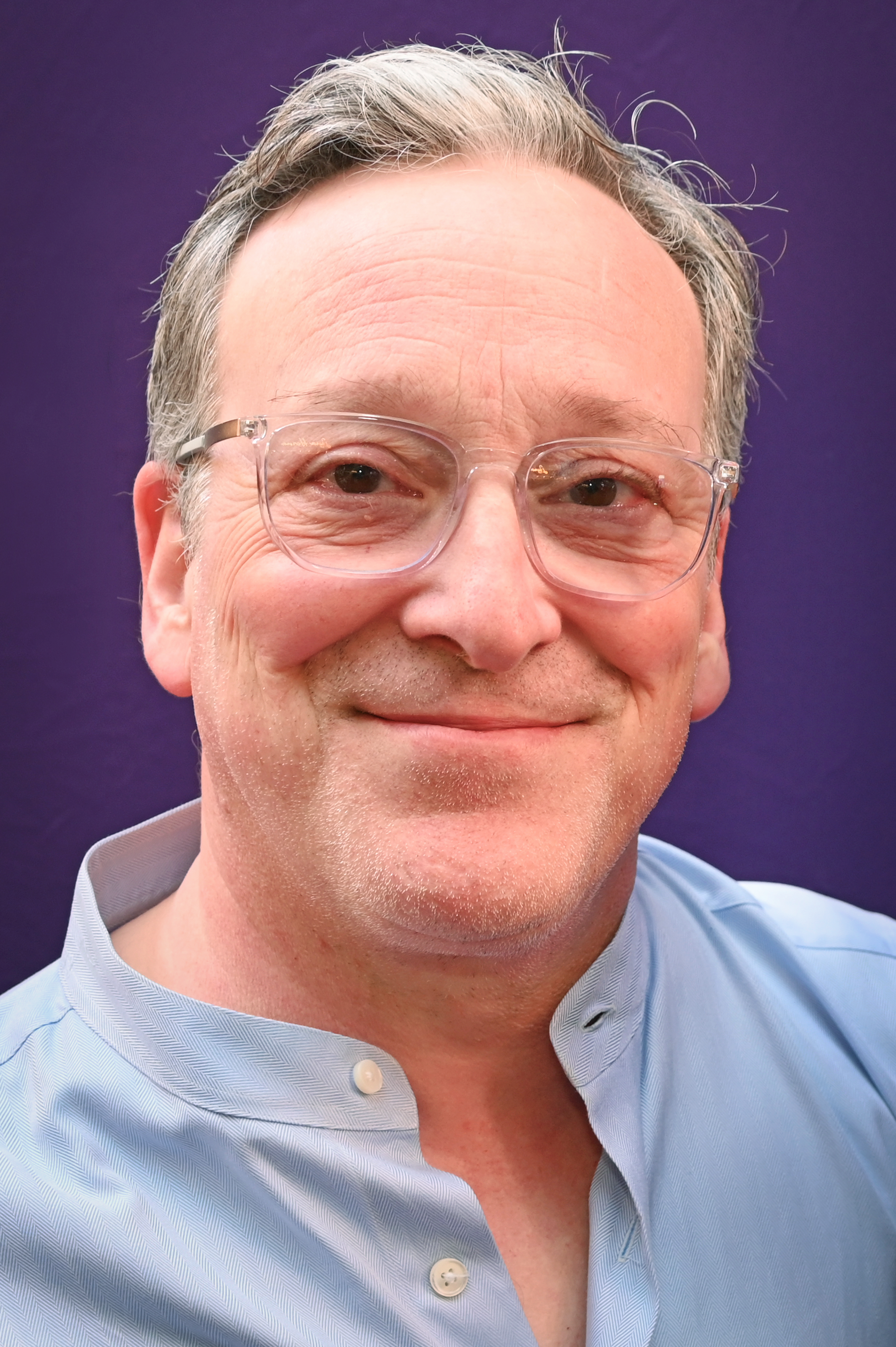
- Shamos in 2026
- Born: February 22, 1970 (age 56); New York City, New York, U.S.
- Education: New York University (MFA)
- Occupation: Actor
- Years active: 1985–present
- Spouse: Nina Hellman
- Children: 2

Jeremy Shamos (born February 22, 1970) is an American actor.

== Early life ==
Shamos was born in New York City but raised in Denver, Colorado. He has a M.F.A. from New York University.

== Career ==
Shamos is an Obie Award-winning, Tony Award-nominated actor based in Brooklyn, New York. His most notable roles in film and television include Dickie Glenroy on Only Murders in the Building, Craig Kettleman on Better Call Saul, Johanes Karlsen on Nurse Jackie, and Ralph in Birdman or (The Unexpected Virtue of Ignorance).

Shamos is also a stage actor, starring in productions including Stephen Sondheim's last musical Here We Are, Steve Martin's Meteor Shower, Clybourne Park, for which Shamos was nominated for a Tony Award, Glengarry Glen Ross (with Al Pacino), The Qualms, The Assembled Parties, Dinner with Friends, 100 Saints You Should Know, and Elling.

== Personal life ==
Shamos is married to actress Nina Hellman. They have two children, a daughter and a son.

== Filmography ==
=== Films ===
Year	Title	Role	Notes
1985	Kid Colter	Justin Colter	
2000	Clowns	Tippit	
2005	The Great New Wonderful	Young Rabbi	
2006	Intolerable	Jeremy 'Snaps' Shamos	Short
2007	Dedication	Matthew	
2009	Taking Woodstock	Steve Cohen	
2009	The Rebound	Bill	
2009	The Disappearance of Eleanor Rigby: Him	Evangelist	
2014	The Disappearance of Eleanor Rigby: Them	Evangelist	
2014	Magic in the Moonlight	George	
2014	Birdman or (The Unexpected Virtue of Ignorance)	Ralph	
2016	No Pay, Nudity	Veterinarian	
2017	Breakable You	Robert Gordon	
2017	The Big Sick	Bob Dalavan	
2017	If I Forget	Michael Fischer	
2019	Bad Education	Phill Metzger	
2020	Ma Rainey's Black Bottom	Irvin	
2026	Disclosure Day	Claypool	

=== Television ===
Year	Title	Role	Notes
2004	Hack	Mark Redding	Episode: "Double Exposure"
2005	Stella	Editor	Episode: "Novel"
2007	Damages	Fiske's Associate	2 episodes
2008	Law & Order: Criminal Intent	John Eckhardt	Episode: "Please Note We Are No Longer Accepting Letters of Recommendation from Henry Kissinger"
2009	Fringe	The Artist	Episode: "Inner Child"
2009	Wainy Days	Waiter	Episode: "Jill"
2013	The Good Wife	Karl Dolan	Episode: "The Next Month"
2014	Unforgettable	Adrian Proctor	Episode: "Til Death"
2014	Law & Order: Special Victims Unit	Roger Pierce	Episode: "Downloaded Child"
2014	Elementary	Dr. Paul Sutherland	Episode: "The Man with the Twisted Lip"
2015	Happyish	Moderator	Episode: "Starring Samuel Beckett, Albert Camus and Alois Alzheimer"
2015	Nurse Jackie	Johanes Karlsen	6 episodes
2015	The Affair	Jeremy Kramos	Episode #2.1
2015	Limitless	Andrew Epperly	Episode: "Side Effects May Include…"
2015; 2022	Better Call Saul	Craig Kettleman	5 episodes
2016	Chicago P.D.	Dr. Dean Reybold	Episode: "Now I'm God"
2016	The Night Of	Dermatologist	Episode: "A Dark Crate"
2016	BrainDead	FBI Director Louis Marchant	Episode: "The Power of Euphemism: How Torture Became a Matter of Debate in American Politics"
2016	Bull	Isaac Chambers	Episode: "Just Tell the Truth"
2017	The Blacklist	James Maddox	Episode: "Lipet's Seafood Company (No. 111)"
2017	SMILF	Craig	Episode: "Half a Sheet Cake & a Blue-Raspberry Slushie"
2019	Blindspot	Casey Marco	Episode: "The One Where Jane Visits an Old Friend"
2019	Fosse/Verdon	Joe Hardy	Episode: "Me and My Baby"
2019	Instinct	Dr. Wells	Episode: "Grey Matter"
2019	Succession	Mark Pierce	Episode: "Tern Haven"
2019	Prodigal Son	David Saverstein	Episode: "Pied-A-Terre"
2019	Evil	Dr. Phillip Lynch-Giles	Episode: "Exorcism Part 2"
2020	The Undoing	Principal Robert Connaver	Miniseries
2021	New Amsterdam	Niall Fincannon	Episode: "Radical"
2022	The Handmaid's Tale	Dr. Alan Landers	Episode: "Together"
2023	Dead Ringers	Joseph	Miniseries
2023	The Gilded Age	Mr. Gilbert	5 episodes
2023–2024	Only Murders in the Building	Dickie Glenroy	8 episodes

=== Stage ===
Year	Title	Role	Notes
1998	Cymbeline	Roman Captain	The Public Theater, Off-Broadway
1998	Corpus Christi	Bartholomew et al.	Manhattan Theatre Club, Off-Broadway
1999	Hamlet	Rosencrantz	The Public Theater, Off-Broadway
2000	The Alchemist	Face	Classic Stage Company, Off-Broadway
2001	Race	Nathan Siegelmann	Classic Stage Company, Off-Broadway
2001	The Complete Works of William Shakespeare (Abridged)	Jeremy	Century Center for the Performing Arts, Off-Broadway
2003	Observe the Sons of Ulster Marching Towards the Somme	Christopher Roulston	Lincoln Center Theater, Off-Broadway
2004	Reckless	Roy/Tim Tinko	Biltmore Theatre, Broadway
2004	Engaged	Cheviot Hill	Lucille Lortel Theatre, Off-Broadway
2004	A Midsummer Nights Dream	Nick Bottom	Williamstown Theatre Festival
2004	The Rivals	Bob Acres	Vivian Beaumont Theater, Broadway
2005	Miss Witherspoon	Father 1 & 2	Playwrights Horizons, Off-Broadway
2006	Gutenberg! The Musical!	Doug	New York Musical Theatre Festival
2007	100 Saints You Should Know	Matthew	Playwrights Horizons, Off-Broadway
2008	Hunting and Gathering	Jesse	59E59 Theaters, Off-Broadway
2008	Animals Out of Paper	Andy	Second Stage Theater, Off-Broadway
2010	Elling	Frank Asli	Ethel Barrymore Theatre, Broadway
2010	A Funny Thing Happened on the Way to the Forum	Senex/Vibrata	Williamstown Theatre Festival
2011	The New York Idea	John Karslake	Atlantic Theater Company, Off-Broadway
2011	We Live Here	Sandy	Manhattan Theatre Club, Off-Broadway
2012	Clybourne Park	Karl/Steve	Walter Kerr Theatre, Broadway
2012	Glengarry Glen Ross	James Lingk	Gerald Schoenfeld Theatre, Broadway
2013	The Assembled Parties	Jeff	Samuel J. Friedman Theatre, Broadway
2014	Dinner With Friends	Gabe	Roundabout Theatre Company, Off-Broadway
2015	The Qualms	Chris	Playwrights Horizons, Off-Broadway
2016	Noises Off	Frederick Fellowes	American Airlines Theatre, Broadway
2017	If I Forget	Michael	Roundabout Theatre Company, Off-Broadway
2017	Meteor Shower	Norm	Booth Theatre, Broadway
2023	Here We Are	Paul Zimmer	The Shed, Off-Broadway
2025	What the Constitution Means to Me	Performer	Nantucket Perfomring Arts Center
2026	ANON: a tempest at our kitchen table	Will	MCC Theater, Off-Broadway
2027	Awake and Sing!	Myron Berger	Samuel J. Friedman Theatre, Broadway

== Awards and nominations ==
Year	Award	Category	Project	Result	Ref
2005	Obie Award	Best Actor	Engaged	Won	
2009	Drama Desk Award	Outstanding Featured Actor in a Play	Animals Out of Paper	Nominated	
2012	Tony Awards	Best Performance by a Featured Actor in a Play	Clybourne Park	Nominated	
2014	Washington D.C. Area Film Critics Association Award	Best Ensemble	Birdman	Won	
2014	San Diego Film Critics Society Award	Best Performance by an Ensemble	Birdman	Won	
2017	Drama Desk Award	Outstanding Featured Actor in a Play	If I Forget	Nominated	
2024	Screen Actors Guild Awards	Outstanding Ensemble in a Drama Series	The Gilded Age	Nominated	
2024	Screen Actors Guild Awards	Outstanding Ensemble in a Comedy Series	Only Murders in the Building	Nominated	
