= The Antiquities =

2025 play by Jordan Harrison

- 2025 Off-Broadway production poster
- Original language: English
- Written by: Jordan Harrison
- Characters: Man 1 Woman 1 Man 2 Woman 2 Man 3 Woman 3 Man 4 Woman 4 Boy
- Genre: Drama

Premiere
- Date: January 11, 2025
- Place: Playwrights Horizons

The Antiquities is a dramatic play by American playwright Jordan Harrison that follows the curators of the Museum of Late Human Antiquities, who archive and recreate human history in the near-future. The play premiered Off-Broadway at Playwrights Horizons in 2025, and later that year, at the Goodman Theatre in Chicago, Illinois.

== Plot ==
Set in the near future, the play follows the Museum of Late Human Antiquities, a museum dedicated to preserving human history. Through various vignettes of different eras of human history and the purported future, everyday objects become artifacts in the museum as the true nature of the museum reveals itself--it is operated by non-organic AI creators.

== Production history ==
Harrison was inspired to write the play based on his interactions with technology and AI, much like his play, Marjorie Prime. He also noted he wanted to write a play in "a kind of pyramidal shape to go forward in time and then back again." He began writing the play before the thought of AI being sentient became reality, which he claims only made it more effective when it premiered, saying "I think people think of this as a more personal subject, one that touches their lives in a way that they didn’t then."

=== Off-Broadway (2025) ===
The play first premiered Off-Broadway in January 2025 at Playwrights Horizons, directed by David Cromer and Caitlin Sullivan, running January 11 to March 2, 2025. The production was co-produced by the Vineyard Theatre and the Goodman Theatre, and starred an ensemble of Cindy Cheung, Marchánt Davis, Layan Elwazani, Andrew Garman, Aria Shahghasem, Kristen Sieh, Ryan Spahn, Julius Rinzel and Amelia Workman as various characters throughout the exhibits.

The Off-Broadway production received largely positive reviews, with The New York Times praising it as "tastefully restrained," while criticizing the framing device as "compelling if somewhat overbearing structural." Observer echoed those sentiments, praising the show's "grimly compelling concept" while opining that "the execution lacks a certain audacity."

The production was nominated for several awards in 2025, including the Outer Critics Circle Award for Outstanding New Off-Broadway Play, three Drama Desk Awards, two Lucille Lortel Awards and the Drama League Award for Outstanding Production of a Play.

=== Chicago (2025) ===
Later that year, the production transferred to the Goodman Theatre in Chicago, Illinois, again directed by Cromer and Sullivan and joined by new cast members Helen Joo Lee (in Cheung's role) and Thomas Murphy Molony (in Rinzel's role). The production ran from May 3, 2025 to June 1, 2025. The production received positive reviews, with New City Stage calling it "intense and sobering" with praise for the "thoughtful, elegiac mood." The Chicago Tribune similarly praised the production, claiming it had "more to say in 95 minutes than most TV shows manage in eight seasons" and that the show was "superlatively acted."

== Cast and characters ==
Character	Off-Broadway 2025	Chicago 2025
Man 1	Aria Shahghasemi	Aria Shahghasemi
Woman 1	Kristen Sieh	Kristen Sieh
Man 2	Marchánt Davis	Marchánt Davis
Woman 2	Amelia Workman	Amelia Workman
Man 3	Andrew Garman	Andrew Garman
Woman 3	Cindy Cheung	Helen Joo Lee
Man 4	Ryan Spahn	Ryan Spahn
Woman 4	Layan Elwazani	Layan Elwazani
Boy	Julius Rinzel	Thomas Murphy Molony

== Accolades ==
=== 2025 Off-Broadway production ===
Year	Award	Category	Nominee	Result	Ref.
2025	Drama Desk Award	Outstanding Direction of a Play	David Cromer and Caitlin Sullivan	Nominated	
2025	Drama Desk Award	Outstanding Costume Design of a Play	Brenda Abbandandolo	Nominated	
2025	Drama Desk Award	Outstanding Lighting Design of a Play	Tyler Micoleau	Nominated	
2025	Outer Critics Circle Award	Outstanding New Off-Broadway Play		Nominated	
2025	Drama League Award	Outstanding Production of a Play		Nominated	
2025	Lucille Lortel Award	Outstanding Play		Nominated	
2025	Lucille Lortel Award	Outstanding Lighting Design	Tyler Micoleau	Won	

=== 2025 Chicago production ===
Year	Award	Category	Nominee	Result	Ref.
2025	Jeff Award	Outstanding Ensemble - Play	Company	Nominated	
2025	Jeff Award	The Libby Adler Mages Award for New Work	Jordan Harrison	Nominated	
