= Tina Satter =

American dramatist

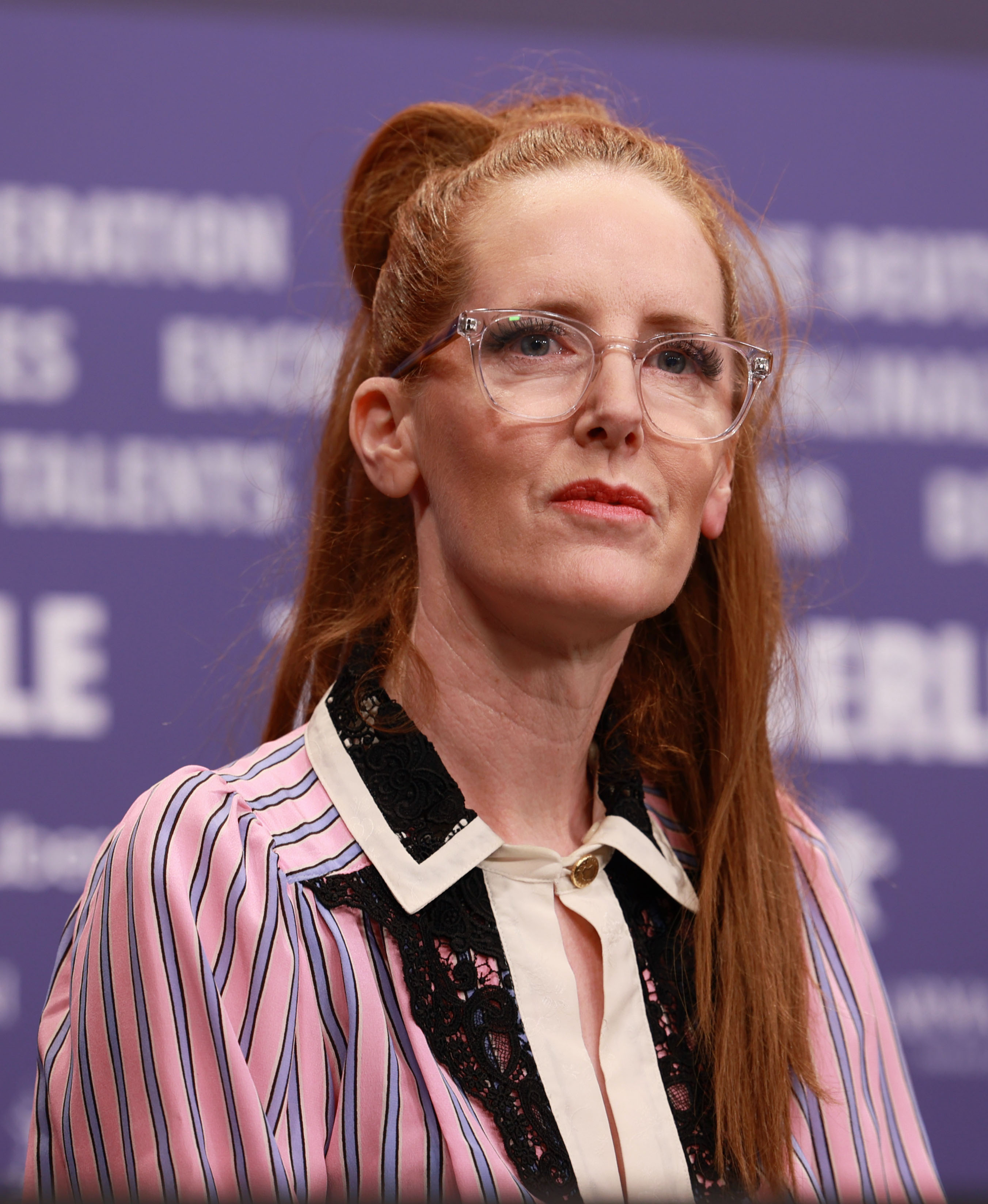
- Satter at the 2023 Berlin International Film Festival
- Born: 1974; Hopkinton, New Hampshire, U.S.
- Occupations: Playwright, director
- Years active: 2008–present
- Website: halfstraddle.com

Kristina "Tina" Satter (born 1974) is an Peabody Award-winning American filmmaker, playwright, and theatre director. She is the founder of the performance group Half Straddle, based in New York City. Satter’s first feature film Reality premiered at the Berlin International Film Festival and Telluride Film Festival in 2023 to critical acclaim.

== Early life and education ==
Satter was born in Hopkinton, New Hampshire. She received a B.A. in English from Bowdoin College in 1996, then went on to complete an M.A. in Liberal Studies at Reed College in 2004. in 2007, Satter moved to Brooklyn, New York, and enrolled in Brooklyn College’s M.F.A. playwriting program.

== Career ==
Tina Satter won a Foundation for Contemporary Arts Grants to Artists award (2016), and a Doris Doris Duke Artist Impact Award in 2014. In 2019, she received a Pew Fellowship. Satter also received a Guggenheim Fellowship in 2020.

Her show Is This A Room was nominated for a number of awards in 2020 and received the following: Obie Award Special Citation for Concept and Direction for Tina Satter; Drama Desk Award for Unique Theatrical Experience; an Obie and a Lucille Lortel Award for Emily Davis's performance as Reality Winner; and an Outer Critics Circle Award for sound designers Sanae Yamada and Lee Kinney.

Satter's film Reality, an adaptation of Is This A Room, won a 2023 Peabody Award for "challenging viewers with a gripping dramatization of real-life events that eschews traditional attempts to explain personal and political motivations, and encouraging us to find in such frictions the very essence of storytelling in a post-truth era."

== Works ==
Is This a Room is a verbatim theatre staging of the June 2017 interrogation of the young American whistleblower Reality Winner. The show premiered at The Kitchen in New York City in January 2019, and went on to an extended, critically acclaimed Off Broadway run at the Vineyard Theatre in fall 2019. The show has been called a "blistering piece of political theater" by Artforum. The cast includes Pete Simpson, TL Thompson, Becca Blackwell, and Emily Davis.

Here I Go, pt. 2 of You was a lecture series organized at The Kitchen in March 2017 and featured lectures by artists including Sarah Schulman, Heidi Hahn, Branden Jacob-Jenkins, Claudia Rankine, Ariel Goldberg and others.

Ghost Rings is a song cycle mirroring Satter's real-life relationship with her estranged sister against a fictional tale of a woman impregnating her childhood friend. It premiered in April 2016 at New York Live Arts and featured Chris Giarmo, Erin Markey, Kristen Sieh, and Tina. It was re-mounted in New York City at the American Realness festival in January 2017. Culturebot wrote about the show "Satter's women fantasize about procreation without men, about holding a piece of another woman in their bodies. In language that is revelatory through its very strangeness, Satter echoes this desire."

Ancient Lives opened in January 2015 at The Kitchen, and centers around a group of young women who go with their teacher into the woods where she leads them in setting up an alternative feminist community and television show and they come under the spell of a witch/warlock. Artforum wrote: "There is a strikingly synthetic quality to Tina Satter's seductive and mesmerizing 'Ancient Lives,' a play that entwines adolescence and obsolescence in order to un-tell a familiar story."

House of Dance was a collaboration with Richard Maxwell's New York City Players, and it portrays an hour in the lives of four people searching for intimacy in a small town tap dance studio. The original cast included Jess Barbagallo, Elizabeth DeMent, Jim Fletcher, and Paul Pontrelli. The show originally premiered at Abrons Art Center in 2013, and then was part of PS122's COIL Festival in January 2014. The show was nominated for a 2014 ZKB Patronage Prize at the Theater Spektakel (Zurich).

Seagull (Thinking of you) was a re-imagining of Anton Chekhov's The Seagull. This production premiered in PS122's COIL festival in New York City in 2013. The original cast included Jess Barbagallo, Eliza Bent, Becca Blackwell, Emily Davis, Julia Sirna-Frest, and Susie Sokol. Erin Markey joined the touring cast.

Away Uniform follows two young women who live far away from everyone they know with a mysterious man, and create a sense of home by re-enacting memories of field hockey drills and made-up rituals. It opened in 2012 at Incubator Arts Project and starred Jess Barbagallo, Emily Davis and Pete Simpson.

In The Pony Palace/FOOTBALL, a female and transgender cast portrays a high school football team. It opened at the Bushwick Starr in 2011. L Magazine wrote "The outsized and peculiar emotions of both high school and sports are brought to bear on this stylized field."

Other works include Nurses in New England (2010), Family (2009), and The Knockout Blow (2008).

Satter is currently working on an adaptation of Rainer Werner Fassbinder's play and film The Bitter Tears of Petra Von Kant. Entitled Petra, it will be performed at Vineyard Theatre in February 2027.

== Filmography ==
=== As director ===
Features
| Year | Title | Director | Writer | Producer | Distributor |
|---|---|---|---|---|---|
| 2023 | Reality | Yes | Yes | No | HBO Films |

=== As herself ===
| Year | Title | Role | Notes |
|---|---|---|---|
| 2022 | Late Night with Seth Meyers | Self | Episode: Late Night Lit: Toby Marlow & Lucy Moss – Tina Satter |
