= Matthew Earnest =

American theater director

Matthew Earnest (born 1969) is an American theater director. He has also written plays, as well as adapted plays from novels, non-fiction books, short stories, and essays, and he has translated works in other languages for his direction.

== Early life and education ==
He grew up in Texas and began his career under Richard Hamburger at Dallas Theater Center. He graduated with a BA in Drama from The University of North Texas, and he holds an MFA in Theatre Directing from York University in Toronto. A skilled writer, Matthew's first job after graduating from college at age 21 was writing the monthly newsletter for The Dallas Buyer's Club, working alongside eccentric founder Ron Woodroof.

== Career ==
Relocating to New York City, Earnest spent a season as assistant director to Lee Breuer at Mabou Mines. With a fellowship from The Drama League, he gained the position of assistant director to legendary American Artistic Director Adrian Hall, a position he held for many years.

Earnest was Founding Artistic Director of New York City’s deep ellum ensemble. With them, he created original works and adapted classics and literary works that garnered international acclaim from 1995 until the company disbanded in 2007. Since 1999, he has been an associate artist at Germany’s English Theatre Berlin where he was the company's first Director in Residence, directing the European premiere of Suzan-Lori Parks' Venus. Since 2001, he has been associated with the University of Delaware’s PTTP/REP theatre company.

Earnest has also worked as an independent director around the United States and abroad. He has directed his own plays, as well as plays he adapted from literature, and his own translations of foreign playwrights. In 2012, he co-founded an international touring company, The Lunar Stratagem, now disbanded. He currently serves as Head of the MFA Directing program at The University of Southern Mississippi.

== Selected works directed ==
(Original plays and adaptations are also indicated.)

- An Enemy of the People by Henrik Ibsen, The Warehouse Theatre, Greenville, SC.
- The Madwoman of Chaillot by Jean Giraudoux, the Lunar Stratagem, Hudson, NY.
- Spring Awakening (musical) by Duncan Sheik & Steven Sater, Argyle Theatre, Babylon Village, NY.
- The Tempest by William Shakespeare, Independent Shakespeare Company, Griffith Park, Los Angeles.
- The Quixotic Days and Errant Nights of the Knight Errant Don Quixote by Brenda Withers. Amphibian Stage Productions, Fort Worth, Texas.
- The Threepenny Opera by Bertolt Brecht. REP Delaware, Newark, DE.
- Wanderlust: A History of Walking, adapted and directed by Earnest from the book by Rebecca Solnit. Ice Factory 2010 at the Ohio Theater, NYC following world premiere at Cleveland Public Theatre.
- Himmelweg by Juan Mayorga, translated by David Johnston. Directed New York City premiere at Teatro Círculo following US premiere at Burning Coal Theatre Company, Raleigh, North Carolina. Transfer Off-Broadway to Repertorio Español.
- The Caucasian Chalk Circle by Bertolt Brecht, translated and directed by Earnest. Roe Green Visiting Director, Kent State University.
- Peter Pan, or The boy who would not grow up by J.M. Barrie, adapted and directed by Earnest, Porthouse Theatre, Cuyahoga Falls, Ohio.
- We Were Civilized Once by Suzan-Lori Parks, from 365 Days/365 Plays. NYSF/Public Theater
- A Doll's House by Henrik Ibsen, English version by Matthew Earnest. The Warehouse Theatre, Greenville, SC
- The Josephine footnote, written and directed by Matthew Earnest, score by Joseph Troski, choreography by Tina Fehlandt. deep ellum ensemble at Daniel Arts Center, Great Barrington, Massachusetts (The Berkshire Fringe) and Hartshorn Theatre, University of Delaware (2006)
- Doctor Tedrow's Last Breath by Matthew Earnest, score by Joseph Troski, choreography by Tina Fehlandt. deep ellum ensemble at Trinity River Arts Center, Dallas, Texas and The Ice Factory, Ohio Theater, NYC (2005)
- Ch’ien-nü leaves her body. by M.E., after a play by Chêng Teh-hui. deep ellum ensemble at The Ontological-Hysteric Theater, NYC
- The Two Gentlemen of Verona by William Shakespeare. Shakespeare Festival of Dallas, Dallas, Texas
- Saints and Singing by Gertrude Stein. deep ellum ensemble at Washington Square Church, NYC; The Present Company Theatorium, NYC; Midtown International Theatre Festival, NYC; The Bridge (Dance-Theater series) at WAX, Brooklyn, NY (excerpts), (2002)
- A Midsummer Night's Dream by William Shakespeare. deep ellum ensemble at The DStv Performing Arts Festival in Addis Ababa, Ethiopia
- Venus by Suzan-Lori Parks. English Theatre Berlin, Germany
- blood pudding by M.E. (premiere). deep ellum ensemble at English Theatre Berlin, Germany; and Dublin Festival Fringe, Dublin, Ireland.
- Puntila and his servant Matti by Bertolt Brecht, English version by M.E. deep ellum ensemble at The Ohio Theater, NYC; and Brecht Centennial/NY Internat’l Fringe Festival (1998)
- Amahl and the Night Visitors by Gian-Carlo Menotti, with Kelly Clarkson, Arlington Opera Association.
- The Jilting of Granny Weatherall, adapted and directed by Matthew Earnest (premiere) from the story by Katherine Anne Porter. deep ellum ensemble at The New York International Fringe Festival: BIFF Award; and English Theatre Berlin, Germany (1998); and The FIT Festival, Dallas, TX and University of Texas, Arlington
- The Purification & The Two-Character Play by Tennessee Williams. deep ellum ensemble at Chelsea Arts Theater, NYC, The Tennessee Williams/New Orleans Literary Festival, New Orleans, LA, English Theater Berlin, Germany
- Wolf at the Door by Erik Ehn (NY premiere). deep ellum ensemble at One Dream Theatre, NYC
- Troilus and Cressida by William Shakespeare. deep ellum ensemble at NADA, Inc., NYC

== Awards ==
- National Endowment for the Arts "Access to Artistic Excellence" grant (2010): "Wanderlust: A History of Walking" (Cleveland Public Theatre, Cleveland, OH)
- Cleveland Scene Best Director (2007): Peter Pan (Porthouse Theatre, Cuyahoga Falls, OH)
- Raleigh News & Observer Top 10 of 2007: Elizabeth: Almost by Chance a Woman (Still Water Theatre, Raleigh, NC)
- Roe Green Visiting Director, Kent State University, 2008
- Cleveland Scene Outstanding revival: Our Town (Porthouse Theatre, Cuyahoga Falls, OH), 2007
- Raleigh News & Observer Top 10 of 2005: Lipstick Traces (Burning Coal Theatre, Raleigh, NC)
- Dallas Morning News Top 10 of 2002: Coriolanus (Kitchen Dog Theater, Dallas, Texas)
- Audience Favourite Award to deep ellum ensemble (blood pudding), Dublin Festival Fringe, 1999
- BIFF Award: Excellence in Ensemble Acting, deep ellum ensemble (The Jilting of Granny Weatherall), NY Fringe Festival, 1997
- Special Interest Residency Grant from The Drama League of New York, 1995
- Dallas Theater Critics’ Forum Award for Outstanding Direction: On the Verge (or The Geography of Yearning) by Eric Overmyer (Moonstruck Theatre Co, Dallas, TX), 1994
- Dallas Observer Best of Dallas Award for Outstanding Production: Fen by Caryl Churchill (Moonstruck Theatre Co), 1993
