= Reality (2023 film) =

2023 film by Tina Satter

- Official release poster
- Based on: Is This a Room by Tina Satter
- Screenplay by: Tina Satter; James Paul Dallas
- Directed by: Tina Satter
- Starring: Sydney Sweeney; Josh Hamilton; Marchánt Davis
- Music by: Nathan Micay
- Country of origin: United States
- Original language: English

Production
- Producers: Noah Stahl; Brad Becker-Parton; Riva Marker; Greg Nobile
- Cinematography: Paul Yee
- Editors: Jennifer Vecchiarello; Ron Dulin
- Running time: 82 minutes
- Production companies: Seaview; 2 Sq Ft; Burn These Words; In the Cut Productions; Fit Via Vi; Cinereach; Tanbark Pictures

Original release
- Network: HBO
- Release: May 29, 2023

Reality is a 2023 American crime drama film directed by Tina Satter from a screenplay by Satter and James Paul Dallas. It is based on the FBI interrogation transcript of American intelligence leaker Reality Winner, which Satter previously staged as the play Is This A Room. It stars Sydney Sweeney as Winner, with Josh Hamilton and Marchánt Davis in supporting roles.

Reality premiered at the 73rd Berlin International Film Festival on February 18, 2023, and was released on May 29, 2023, by HBO Films. The film received critical acclaim, with praise for Satter's direction and Sweeney's performance. The film received a 2023 Peabody Award.

== Plot ==
On May 9, 2017, Reality Winner watches Fox News coverage on the firing of James Comey by President Donald Trump on the TV at her office. Twenty-five days later, on June 3, Winner returns home from grocery shopping, where she is confronted by FBI agents Taylor and Garrick, who explain they have a warrant to search her house and her belongings. As a team of agents arrive and begin searching the house, Winner engages in casual conversation with the agents, all of which is picked up by recording device, the transcript of which forms the basis of the film's dialogue. During the early portion of the recording, Winner expresses concern for her dog's and cat's safety during the search.

Winner agrees to speak with Taylor and Garrick in an empty, disused bedroom in her house. Garrick and Taylor start to ask her about the specifics of her work. She explains, besides working as a yoga instructor and CrossFit trainer, she is a Persian translator for a government contractor and is hoping to be deployed to Afghanistan as a translator so her fluency in Pashto can be better utilized. The agents eventually reveal they are questioning Winner about the recent leak of classified government documents to an online publication. Winner initially denies knowledge, but over the course of an hour is eventually compelled to confess she printed and leaked a document from the National Security Agency's database. The film initially redacts specifics of the leak, as is done in the transcript, by having the characters briefly disappear when saying redacted phrases—but in a fourth wall-breaking sequence Winner forcefully ends the redactions, revealing to the audience that the documents provided proof of Russian interference in the 2016 United States elections and the publication was The Intercept, which had put out a call for evidence of Russian interference.

Winner denies wishing to be a whistleblower or to undermine the intelligence community à la Edward Snowden, instead saying she wanted the American public to have the same information the government had about the election. As the interrogation wraps up, she chiefly expresses concern for her pets as she realizes she will be taken into custody. She is escorted out of her house and handcuffed, as footage is shown of media reports about the leak. Winner receives both praise and criticism for her actions, with some accusing her of colluding with the Middle East or denying the veracity of the leaks altogether. Some outlets criticize The Intercept for allowing the leak to be traced to Winner, and others theorize that Winner's disproportionate punishment was designed to discourage potential whistleblowers.

A textual epilogue explains that Winner was denied bail and charged under the Espionage Act. She spent four years in jail and will remain on supervised release until November 2024. It notes that the same document Winner leaked was later used on the Senate floor as evidence of Russian interference.

== Cast ==
- Sydney Sweeney as Reality Winner
- Josh Hamilton as Agent Garrick / Justin C. Garrick
- Marchánt Davis as Agent Taylor / R. Wallace Taylor
- Benny Elledge as "Joe" / Unknown Male (Note: "Unknown Male" is a classification in the transcript referring to multiple FBI agents who were present in Winner's house on June 3, 2017, several of whom were caught on the audio recording.)
- John Way as FBI Agent

== Production ==
=== Development ===
The film depicts the interrogation of intelligence leaker Reality Winner, which took place on the day of her arrest on June 3, 2017. A former enlisted US Air Force member and NSA translator, Winner leaked an intelligence report about Russian interference in the 2016 United States elections to the news website The Intercept. She was confronted at her home in Augusta, Georgia, by FBI agents R. Wallace Taylor and Justin C. Garrick, who interrogated her over the course of an hour in an unused room in the house.

Tina Satter turned the interrogation transcript into the verbatim theatre performance Is This a Room (based on the transcript quote "Is this a room? Is that a room?" spoken in the film by an FBI agent played by John Way), which premiered at The Kitchen in 2019 before an extended off-Broadway run at the Vineyard Theatre later that year. The production starred Emily Davis as Winner, with Pete Simpson and TL Thompson as the interrogators, and Becca Blackwell as "Unknown Male", a classification in the transcript for dialogue from multiple FBI agents who were inspecting Winner's house during the interrogation. The play premiered on Broadway at the Lyceum Theatre on October 10, 2021, and closed on November 27, 2021. Winner was not involved with the production during its initial off-Broadway run due to her imprisonment, and was unable to see the Broadway production due to still being under house arrest, but spoke with the creative team extensively after her release from prison and video-called into the opening night performance's curtain call.

In June 2022, it was announced that Is This a Room would be adapted into a film, with Sydney Sweeney, Josh Hamilton, and Marchánt Davis starring and Satter directing in her film debut, from a screenplay she co-wrote with James Paul Davis. In preparation for her role, Sweeney watched interviews and spoke with Winner over Zoom and text. She used these conversations to understand Winner's speaking mannerisms, which she mimicked. Mindful of Winner's job as a yoga trainer and CrossFit instructor, Sweeney also trained to increase her muscle mass, in some cases using workouts Winner posted on her Instagram. In addition to her conversations with Sweeney, Winner consulted with the wardrobe and art departments throughout the production process. Despite her involvement and support for the film, Winner claims she will likely never see it, due to finding the prospect of reliving the day of her arrest too traumatic.

=== Filming ===
Principal photography began in May 2022, over the course of 16 days. Exterior filming was done at the start of production, with the final 9–10 days focused on filming inside the room set. The entire interrogation sequence was filmed in order, which Sweeney found unusual, as most productions she had worked on filmed out of order.

== Release ==
The film received its world premiere at the 73rd Berlin International Film Festival on February 18, 2023. Prior to, mk2 Films acquired international sales rights to the film. Shortly thereafter, HBO Films acquired US distribution rights to the film. It was released on HBO on May 29, 2023. The film was given a theatrical release in international markets including the United Kingdom and Ireland on June 2, Australia on June 29, and France on August 16.

== Reception ==
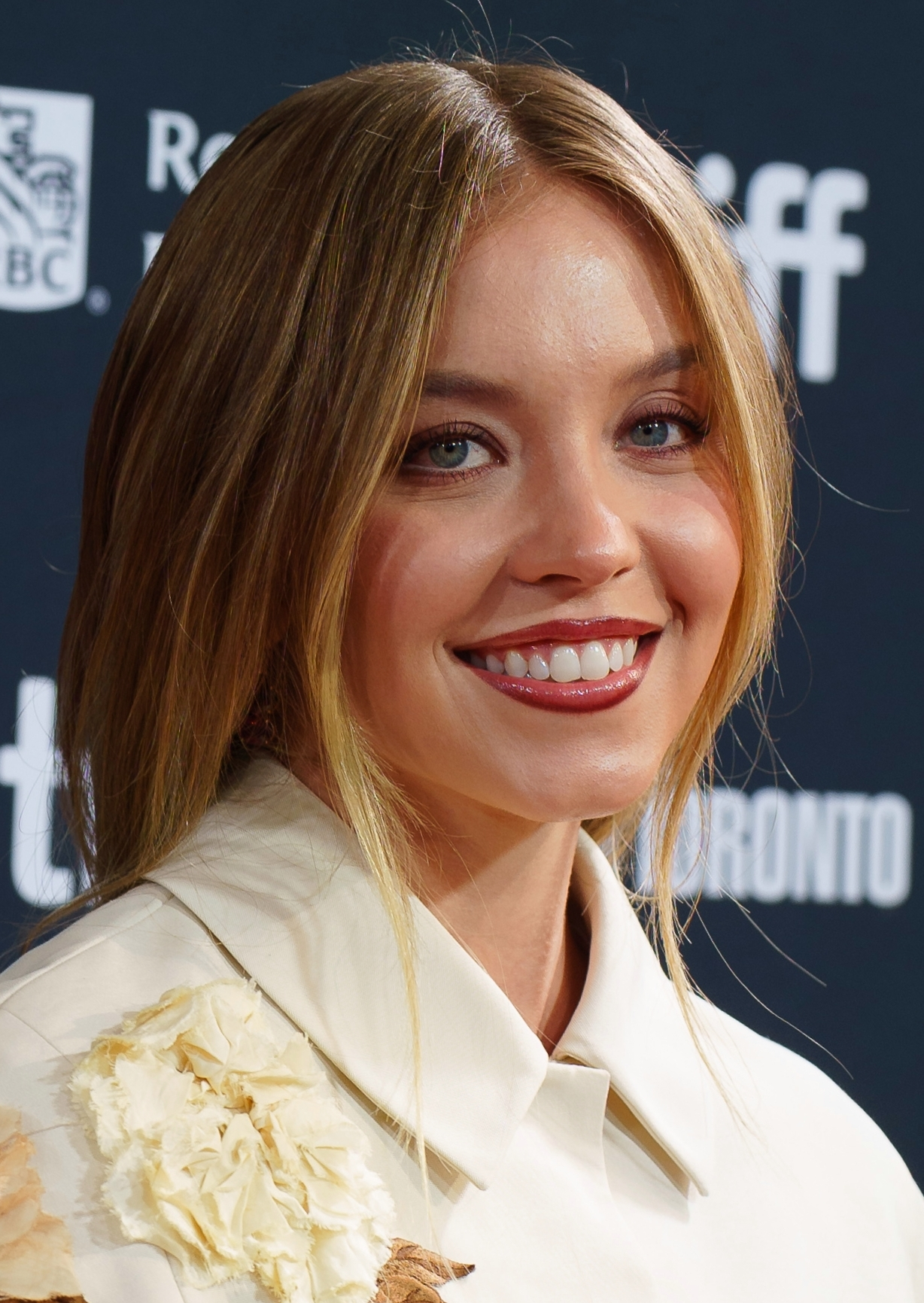
Sydney Sweeney's performance garnered widespread praise from critics.

Reality received positive reviews from critics at Berlinale, with praise for Satter's direction and the cast performances (particularly Sweeney's). On the review aggregator website Rotten Tomatoes, 93% of 92 critics' reviews are positive, with an average rating of 8/10. The website's consensus reads: "Reality's narrow scope and gripping fact-based story add up to a riveting showcase for Sydney Sweeney in the title role." Metacritic, which uses a weighted average, assigned the film a score of 83 out of 100, based on 27 critics, indicating "universal acclaim".

David Rooney of The Hollywood Reporter praised the transition from the minimalist set design of Is This a Room to the film's realistic recreation of Winner's house, noting "Satter shows unfaltering command of the medium for a first-time film director", highlighting the use of the closeup as a direct translation of the play's surreal storytelling.

=== Accolades ===
Award	Date of ceremony	Category	Recipient(s)	Result	Ref.
Berlin International Film Festival	February 25, 2023	Panorama Audience Award – Feature Film	Reality	Nominated	
Berlin International Film Festival	February 25, 2023	GWFF Best First Feature Award	Tina Satter	Nominated	
Jerusalem Film Festival	July 23, 2023	Best Documentary	Reality	Won	
Gold Derby Awards	August 16, 2023	TV Movie	Reality	Nominated	
Awards Daily Cooler Awards	September 18, 2023	Outstanding Lead Actress in a Limited/Anthology Series	Sydney Sweeney	Nominated	
Gotham Independent Film Awards	November 27, 2023	Best Feature	Reality	Nominated	
Cinema Eye Honors	January 12, 2024	Heterodox Award	Reality	Nominated	
Critics' Choice Awards	January 14, 2024	Best Movie Made for Television	Reality	Nominated	
Critics' Choice Awards	January 14, 2024	Best Actress in a Movie/Miniseries	Sydney Sweeney	Nominated	
Producers Guild of America Awards	February 25th, 2024	Best Streamed or Televised Movie	Reality	Nominated	
Peabody Awards	May 9, 2024	Entertainment	Reality	Won	

== See also ==
- Winner (2024), another film based on Reality Winner
