= Marjorie Prime =

- Directed by: Michael Almereyda
- Screenplay by: Michael Almereyda
- Based on: Marjorie Prime by Jordan Harrison
- Produced by: Uri Singer
- Starring: Jon Hamm; Geena Davis; Lois Smith; Tim Robbins
- Cinematography: Sean Price Williams
- Edited by: Kathryn J. Schubert
- Music by: Mica Levi
- Production company: BB Film Productions
- Distributed by: FilmRise
- Release dates: January 23, 2017 (Sundance); August 18, 2017 (United States)
- Running time: 98 minutes
- Country: United States
- Language: English

Marjorie Prime is a 2017 American science-fiction film written and directed by Michael Almereyda, based on Jordan Harrison's 2014 play. It stars Jon Hamm, Tim Robbins, Geena Davis, and Lois Smith. Footage was screened for buyers at the 66th Berlin International Film Festival. It premiered at the 2017 Sundance Film Festival.

== Plot ==
Around the year 2050, 85-year-old Marjorie is experiencing the first symptoms of Alzheimer's disease. To bring her comfort, her daughter Tess and son-in-law Jon hire a service called Prime, designed to assist Alzheimer patients by creating holographic projections of deceased family members which are "fed" with the patients' memories so that they can "retell" them back in case they forget them. Marjorie has chosen a younger version of her late husband Walter, who died fifteen years earlier. This choice disturbs Tess, so she does not talk to Walter's hologram. Marjorie tells stories of her life to Walter Prime and enjoys listening to him tell them back, usually asking him to embellish some to make them better and prettier the next time he tells them, so that the new story will become her new memory. Meanwhile, Julie, Marjorie's caretaker, moves in with the family to watch over her and confides in Walter.

In time, Walter Prime becomes curious about the real Walter's personal and professional lives and starts asking Jon about them. Jon tells Walter Prime a family secret that must never be repeated to Marjorie: She and Walter had a son named Damian who committed suicide forty years earlier and, before doing so, killed the beloved family dog Toni II (a black French poodle who looked just like the family's previous dog, Toni) to take her with him. Marjorie hasn't said Damian's name since then. Despite Walter Prime's understanding about not telling her, Marjorie suddenly asks for Damian in a bout of dementia. Tess finds a Bible in the living room table and accuses Julie (who had given it to Marjorie) of taking advantage of Marjorie's condition to religiously manipulate her (since Marjorie has always been an atheist), which prompts Marjorie to become upset and urinate herself.

Later on Tess and Marjorie are sitting on the couch talking. It is soon revealed that Marjorie has died and Tess is talking to a Prime version of Marjorie; Jon recommended the Prime Program for his wife to help her cope with the death of her mother. Tess remains highly skeptical of the Prime program, especially because Marjorie Prime is constantly smiling and appears to be too understanding to truly impersonate Marjorie's real personality. This leads Tess to realize she has chosen the aged version of her mother because this is the version she still has things she needs to say to. Meanwhile, in a flashback to when Walter was alive, he and Marjorie are sitting on the couch watching the nightly news, which shows “The Gates,” an art exhibit by Christo and Jeanne-Claude that was installed in New York City's Central Park in February 2005. As was explained in an earlier scene, this was shortly after Walter and Marjorie's son, Damian, killed Toni II and committed suicide. Walter and Marjorie become emotional and embrace one another.

Sometime later, Jon is talking to what is revealed to be a Prime version of Tess in the living room; a year has passed, and Tess, apparently still unable to deal with Marjorie's death, had hanged herself during a vacation in Madagascar. Jon brings Tess' granddaughter to meet Tess Prime because she never met the real Tess while she was alive, due to Tess' estrangement from her daughter.

Years later, Tess' granddaughter is grown up and Jon is very old. In the house's living room, Walter Prime, Marjorie Prime, and Tess Prime talk about the old days, reliving old memories. They discuss a memory of the dog Toni II, believing Tess was the one who picked him out. Walter tells them that Tess didn't pick Toni; Damian did. He picked her because she looked like their previous dog, also named Toni, who died before Tess was born and whom she never knew existed. After hearing the story, Marjorie Prime and Tess Prime can remember Damian too. As Walter Prime apologizes for making them sad with his story, Marjorie Prime responds by saying the only thing she can think of is "how nice that we could love somebody".

== Cast ==
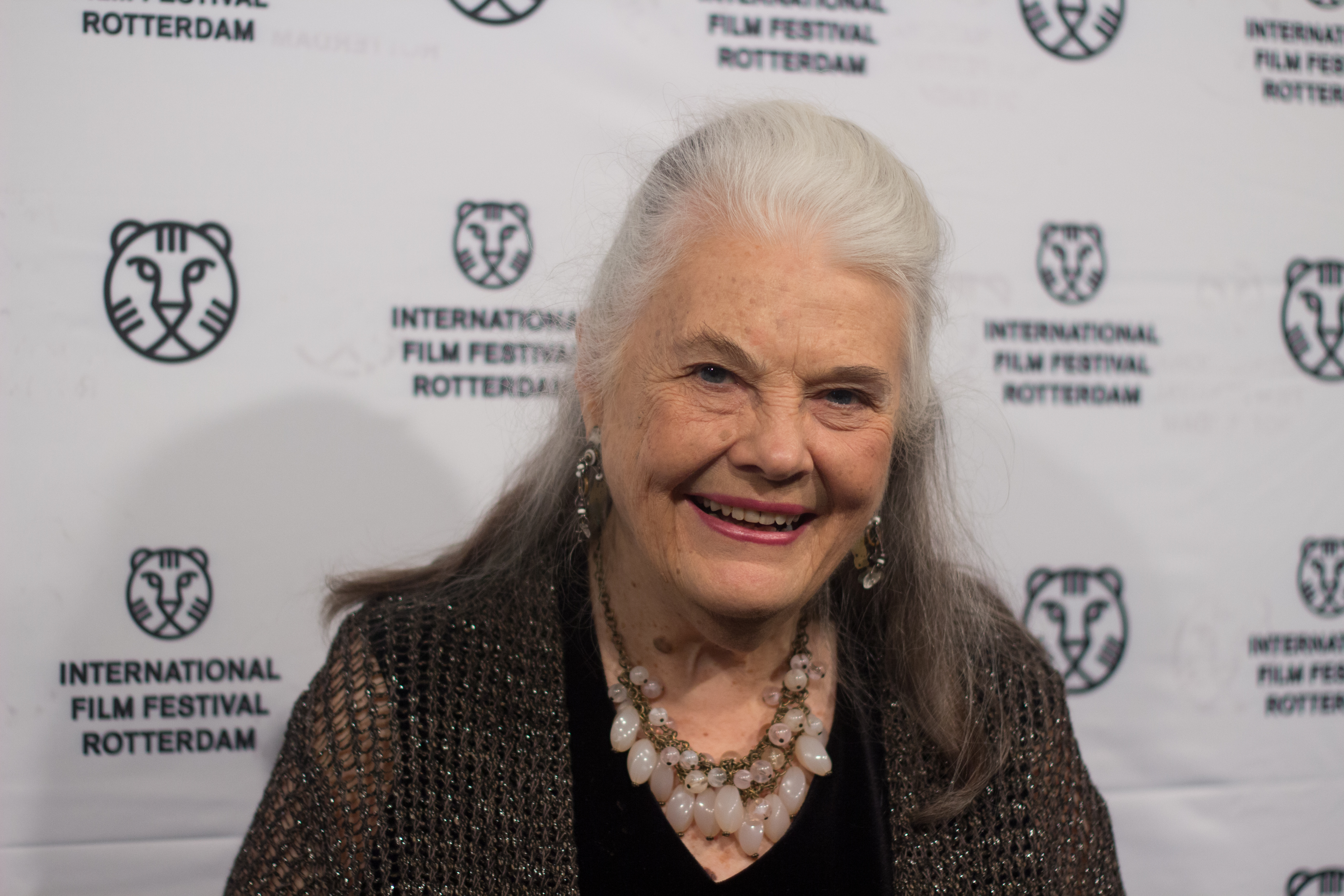
Lois Smith at the international premiere of Marjorie Prime

- Lois Smith as Marjorie/Marjorie Prime
  - Hannah Gross as Young Marjorie
- Jon Hamm as Walter/Walter Prime
- Tim Robbins as Jon
  - Bill Walters as Old Jon
- Geena Davis as Tess/Tess Prime
  - India Reed Kotis as Young Tess
- Stephanie Andujar as Julie
- Leslie Lyles as Mrs. Salveson
- Cashus Muse as Bartender
- Hana Colley as Second Generation Marjorie, Age 10
  - Azumi Tsutsui as Second Generation Marjorie, Age 30

== Release ==
FilmRise acquired distribution rights to the film after its premiere at the 2017 Sundance Film Festival.

== Reception ==
=== Critical response ===
Marjorie Prime received critical acclaim. It holds an approval rating of 90% on Rotten Tomatoes based on 92 reviews, with an average rating of 7.42/10. The website's critical consensus reads, "Intimate in setting yet ambitious in scope, the beautifully acted Marjorie Prime poses thought-provoking questions about memory, humanity, and love." On Metacritic, the film has a weighted average score of 82 out of 100, based on 28 critics, indicating "universal acclaim".

=== Accolades ===
The film won the Sloan Feature Film Prize, which includes a $20,000 cash award, presented at the 2017 Sundance Film Festival. The award jury awarded the film for its "imaginative and nuanced depiction of the evolving relationship between humans and technology, and its moving dramatization of how intelligent machines can challenge our notions of identity, memory and mortality.” The jury members were Heather Berlin, Tracy Drain, Nell Greenfieldboyce, Nicole Perlman, and Jennifer Phang.

Award	Date of ceremony	Category	Recipient(s)	Result	Ref.
Gotham Independent Film Awards	November 27, 2017	Best Actress	Lois Smith	Nominated	
Independent Spirit Awards	March 3, 2018	Best Supporting Female	Lois Smith	Nominated	
Satellite Awards	February 10, 2018	Best Supporting Actress in a Motion Picture	Lois Smith	Won	
Saturn Awards	June 2018	Best Supporting Actress	Lois Smith	Nominated	
