= Lois Smith =

American actress (born 1930)

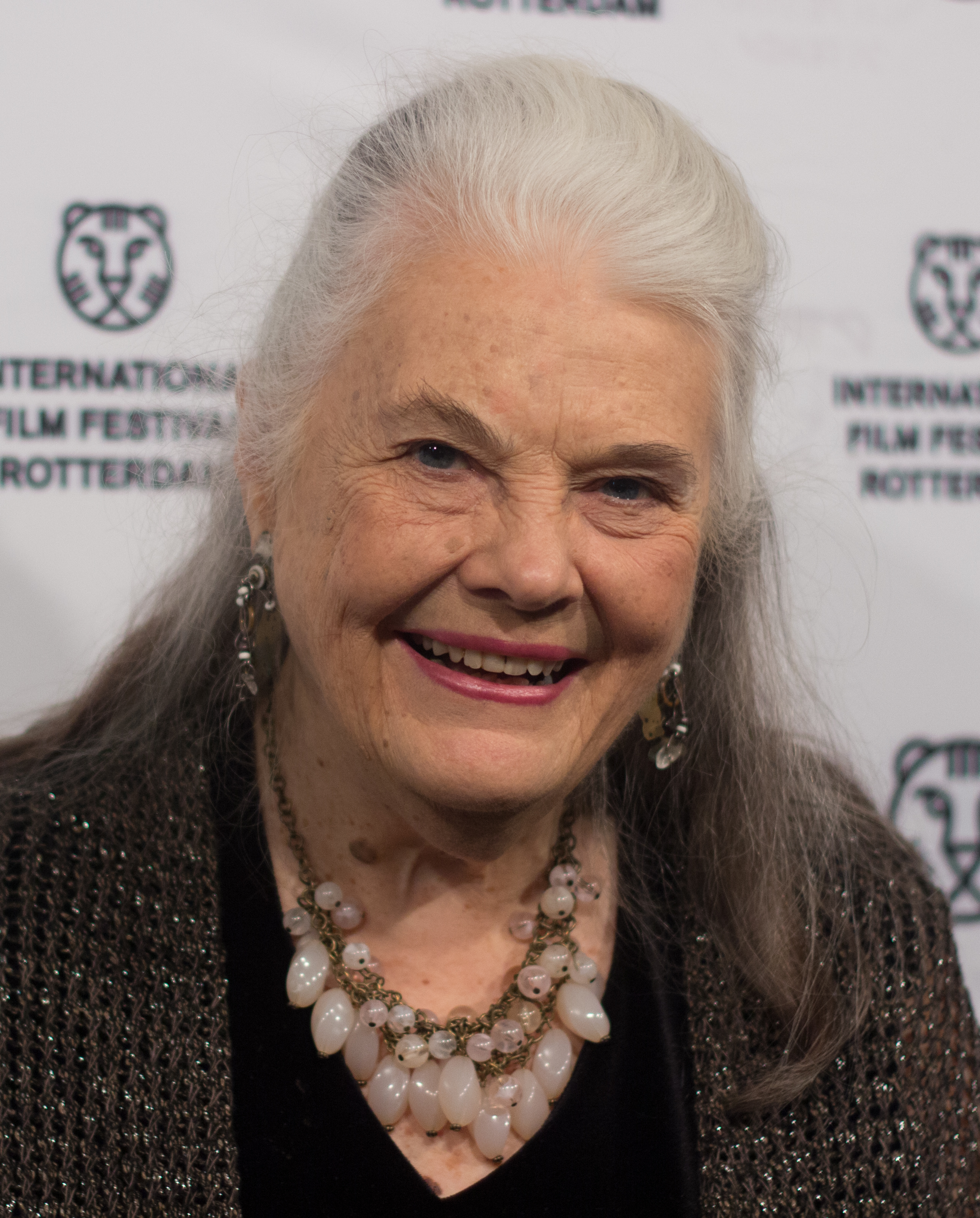
- Smith in 2017
- Born: Lois Arlene Humbert; November 3, 1930 (age 96); Topeka, Kansas, U.S.
- Occupation: Actress
- Years active: 1952–present
- Spouse: Wesley Smith (m. 1948; div. 1970)
- Children: 1

Lois Arlene Smith (née Humbert; born November 3, 1930) is an American actress whose career spans eight decades. She made her film debut in the 1955 drama film East of Eden, and later played supporting roles in a number of movies, including Five Easy Pieces (1970), Resurrection (1980), Fatal Attraction (1987), Fried Green Tomatoes (1991), Falling Down (1993), How to Make an American Quilt (1995), Dead Man Walking (1995), Twister (1996), Minority Report (2002), The Nice Guys (2016), Lady Bird (2017), and The French Dispatch (2021).

In 2017, Smith received critical acclaim for her leading performance in the science-fiction drama film Marjorie Prime, for which she was nominated for an Independent Spirit Awards, Gotham Awards and Saturn Award, and won a Satellite Award. She has also had many roles on daytime and primetime television. She was a regular cast member in the HBO horror drama True Blood, and received a Critics' Choice Television Award for Best Guest Performer in a Drama Series nomination for The Americans.

Smith also is known for her extensive work in the theatre. A three-time Tony Award nominee, she won the 2020 Tony Award for Best Featured Actress in a Play for her performance in The Inheritance, becoming the oldest performer to win a Tony Award for acting. She also received Tony nominations for her performances in The Grapes of Wrath (1990) and Buried Child (1996). She starred in an acclaimed Off-Broadway revival of The Trip to Bountiful in 2005 for which she received an Obie Award for Best Actress, an Outer Critics Circle Award, a Lucille Lortel Award, and a Drama Desk Award. She is an ensemble member of Steppenwolf Theatre Company in Chicago.

She was inducted into the American Theatre Hall of Fame in 2007 for her outstanding contributions to the theatre. In 2013, she received a Lifetime Achievement Obie Award for excellence in Off-Broadway performances. She has taught, directed, and written for the stage.

== Early life ==
Smith was born Lois Arlene Humbert in Topeka, Kansas, the youngest of six children of Carrie (née Gottshalk) and William Humbert, who worked for a telephone company. Her father died in 1950 at age 54. Her family included her two sisters, Alice and Marvelle, and three brothers, William, Dilman, and Phillip, all of whom are now deceased. Her father moved the family to Seattle when Lois was 11 years old, and he was involved heavily in the church, staging plays there in which young Lois performed. She studied theatre at the University of Washington but did not graduate. At age 18, she married Wesley Dale Smith, whom she met in college; they divorced in 1970. They had one daughter, Moon Elizabeth Smith.

Around 1951, Smith and her husband decided to leave Seattle for New York City to begin their professional careers. After she worked with Elia Kazan on East of Eden, he encouraged her to study with Lee Strasberg at the Actors Studio, which she did. She was also mentored in her early years in New York City by John Van Druten.

== Career ==
=== Theatre ===
Smith made her Broadway debut in 1952 at age 22 in the play Time Out for Ginger as Joan, with Nancy Malone as Ginger and Melvyn Douglas as their father. She followed this in 1955 with The Wisteria Trees, a play that starred Helen Hayes. In 1956, she performed with Hayes in The Glass Menagerie. Also in 1955, she was given the lead role of Josephine Perry in Sally Benson's play The Young and Beautiful, which ran for 65 performances at the Longacre Theatre.

In 1957, Smith originated the role of Carol Cutrere in Orpheus Descending by Tennessee Williams, which also starred Maureen Stapleton. In 1958, she was directed by José Ferrer in Edwin Booth.

From 1965 to 1967, Smith starred in several plays as a company member with the Theatre of the Living Arts in Philadelphia with Andre Gregory. She is a lifetime member of Ensemble Studio Theatre, founded by Curt Dempster in 1968.

In 1973, she returned to Broadway to appear in a revival of The Iceman Cometh by Eugene O'Neill. In 1975, she performed the role of Gaby in Corinne Jacker's play Harry Outside. She also played the lead female role in Steve Tesich's play Touching Bottoms in 1978. In 1979, she played the role of Denise in Elizabeth Stearns's play Hillbilly Women at the Long Wharf Theatre. In 1987, she played Jessie Bliss in Darrah Cloud's The Stick Wife with the Hartford Stage Company.

In 1988, Smith was cast with the Steppenwolf Theatre Company of Chicago as Ma Joad in the play The Grapes of Wrath, an adaptation of the 1939 Steinbeck novel. Smith originated the stage role, and after going on tour, the production reached Broadway in 1990 and Smith earned a Tony Award nomination for Best Featured Actress in a Play.

Also in 1988, Smith originated the role of Mrs. Campbell in Horton Foote's The Man Who Climbed the Pecan Trees. In 1989, she played Mistress Overdone in an Off-Broadway production of William Shakespeare's Measure for Measure.

Smith has been an ensemble member of the Steppenwolf Theatre Company since 1993.

In 1995, Smith starred as Halie in a revival of Buried Child by Sam Shepard at the Steppenwolf Theatre Company that transferred to Broadway in 1996, and for which she received her second nomination for the Tony Award for Best Featured Actress in a Play. In 1997, Smith played the role of Betty in Defying Gravity by Jane Anderson Off-Broadway. In 1998, she played Kandall Kingsley in Beth Henley's Impossible Marriage. In 2001, she starred in the title role of Mother Courage and Her Children, and in 2002 she starred as Fanny Cavendish in a revival of The Royal Family, both with the Steppenwolf Theatre Company.

In 2005, Smith starred in an Off-Broadway production of The Trip to Bountiful as Carrie Watts with the Signature Theatre Company, for which she received an Obie Award for Best Actress, an Outer Critics Circle Award, a Lucille Lortel Award, and a Drama Desk Award.

In 2010, Smith played Vera in Amy Herzog's After the Revolution, for which she was nominated for a Lucille Lortel Award. In 2012 she originated the role of Mable Murphy in Sam Shepard's play Heartless, and in 2013, she starred in a revival of Horton Foote's My Old Friends. In 2014, she starred in a new play by Jordan Harrison, Marjorie Prime, originating the title role at the Mark Taper Forum. She was featured in Annie Baker's play John, which opened Off-Broadway at the Signature Theatre Company on July 22, 2015, and ran to September 6.

In 2018, she took on the leading role in Brooklyn College student Lily Thorne's Peace for Mary Frances. The drama, directed by Lila Neugebauer, was given its world premiere by off-Broadway's The New Group at the Pershing Square Signature Center in New York. Smith's performance was praised, but the play received negative reviews from a variety of outlets from The New York Times to The Hollywood Reporter and The Wrap.

=== Film ===
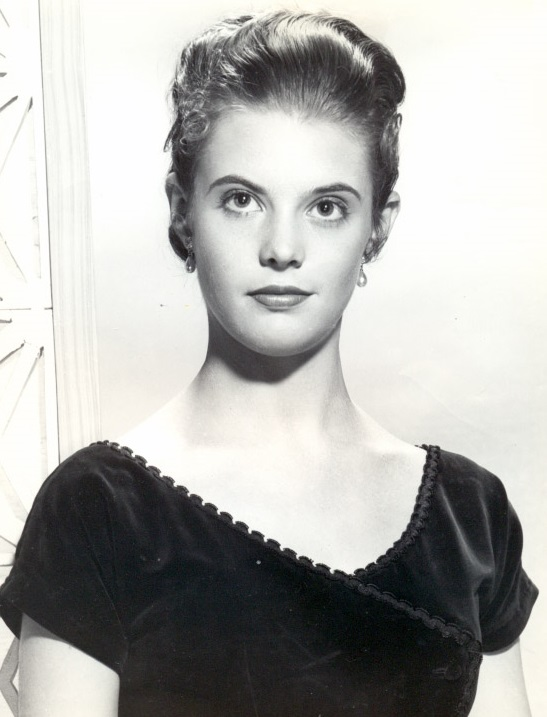
Smith in 1955, Warner Bros. studio publicity photo

Smith made her film debut in 1955 directed by Elia Kazan in the drama film East of Eden with James Dean, Julie Harris, and Jo Van Fleet. Her next film was the western Strange Lady in Town. In November 1955, she was featured on the cover of Life magazine. Smith then focused on television work, not making a film until The Way We Live Now in 1970. She then earned critical acclaim for her role as Partita Dupea, the sister of Jack Nicholson's character in Five Easy Pieces (1970), and Smith won the National Society of Film Critics Award for Best Supporting Actress.

Supporting roles in films in the 1970s and 1980s included Up the Sandbox, Next Stop, Greenwich Village, Resurrection, Foxes, Four Friends, Reuben, Reuben, Reckless, Black Widow, Fatal Attraction, and Midnight Run.

Supporting roles in the 1990s and 2000s included Green Card, Fried Green Tomatoes, How to Make an American Quilt, Falling Down, Holy Matrimony, Dead Man Walking, Twister, Tumbleweeds, The Pledge, Minority Report, P.S., Sweet Land, Hollywoodland, and Killshot. In the 2010s, Smith played supporting roles in Please Give, The Nice Guys, The Comedian, and the documentary The Gettysburg Address.

In 2017, Smith appeared in the science-fiction drama film Marjorie Prime, for which she won the Satellite Award for Best Supporting Actress at the 22nd ceremony. Later that year, she had a supporting role in the critically acclaimed comedy-drama Lady Bird, receiving a Screen Actors Guild Award for Outstanding Performance by a Cast in a Motion Picture nomination. She was later cast in The French Dispatch, a drama film written and directed by Wes Anderson.

=== Television ===
Smith made her television debut in 1953 on Kraft Television Theatre. In 1954, she appeared as the daughter of Mary Astor in a Studio One production. On December 26, 1955, she starred as Swedish opera singer Jenny Lind in Sandra Michael's "The Second Day of Christmas", an episode of Robert Montgomery Presents that portrays the relationship between Lind and Hans Christian Andersen. Smith performed on many series through the 1950s and 1960s, guest-starring on Naked City, The Doctors, Dr. Kildare, and The Defenders. In 1956, she appeared with John Cassavetes in Bring Me a Dream, a teleplay by John Vlahos, and she appeared as Felicia in Noon on Doomsday, written by Rod Serling. In 1959, she was given the lead role of Cindy in the teleplay Cindy's Fella, a modernized version of Cinderella, with James Stewart and directed by Gower Champion.

In 1960, she performed in The Master Builder as Hilda and as Julie in Miss Julie in public television specials. Also in 1960, she appeared as Lena in a teleplay based on Victory by Joseph Conrad, and in a teleplay version of Men In White by Sidney Kingsley as Barbara Dennin. She did four episodes of Route 66, and in 1967 performed in Do Not Go Gentle into That Good Night on CBS Playhouse with Shirley Booth. In 1970, she performed with Kim Stanley in a television special of Tennessee Williams's plays, Dragon Country.

In 1978, Smith played the lead role of Stacey MacAindra in the teleplay Stacey based on Margaret Laurence's The Fire Dwellers. In 1980, she appeared in the television film The Jilting of Granny Weatherall as the daughter of Geraldine Fitzgerald, and in 1981 played Bertha in a television film version of The House of Mirth.

She played supporting roles in the Emmy-nominated TV films Rage of Angels (1983), The Execution of Raymond Graham (1985), Switched at Birth (1991) and Skylark (1993). She guest-starred on two episodes of The Equalizer and one episode of Thirtysomething in 1991.

In 1991, she portrayed Alice, the mother of Thelma Todd, in White Hot: The Mysterious Murder of Thelma Todd and in 1995 portrayed Margaret, the mother of Bess Truman in the Emmy-nominated television film Truman. She guest-starred on episodes of The Practice, Frasier, Just Shoot Me!, Touched by an Angel, Cold Case and Law & Order.

In 2002, Smith appeared in The Laramie Project and in 2004 she portrayed Anna Howard Shaw in the Emmy-nominated film Iron Jawed Angels. In 2007, she guest-starred on four episodes of ER and in 2009 in A Dog Year with Jeff Bridges. She played Adele Stackhouse, the grandmother of Anna Paquin's character on True Blood and played the mother-in-law of Felicity Huffman's character on Desperate Housewives.

In 2015, Smith was nominated for a Critics' Choice Television Award for Best Guest Performer for her role in an episode of The Americans. In 2017 she guest-starred in "The Gun", episode five of the third season of the Netflix series Grace and Frankie, as Mrs. Hanson, the vituperative mother of Martin Sheen's character Robert. Also in 2017, she guest-starred in "In the Pink", episode 4 of season 4 of Younger, as Belinda Lacroix, a Barbara Cartland-type romance novelist. In 2019, she guest-starred in Mom as Claire, Bonnie and Tammy's former caretaker at the old foster home.

In 2024, Smith appeared in several episodes of Law & Order: Organized Crime as "Mama Boone", matriarch of a honey farm used as a front for heroin distribution.

Soap opera fans have seen Smith on daytime in many recurring and guest-starring roles over the years, as the psychotic wife Zoe Cannell on Somerset (1972–1974), Eleanor Conrad on The Doctors (1975–1977), Ella Fitz (the co-conspirator of evil Alma Rudder) on Another World (1982–1983), Mrs. Oakes on The Edge of Night (1983), Elwinna Pendergast on All My Children, and as Dorian's imperious aunt Betsy Cramer on One Life to Live (2003–2004).

== Filmography ==
=== Film ===
Year	Title	Role	Notes
1955	East of Eden	Anne	
1955	Strange Lady in Town	Spurs O'Brien	
1970	The Way We Live Now	Jane Aldridge	
1970	Five Easy Pieces	Partita Dupea	
1972	Up the Sandbox	Elinore	
1976	Next Stop, Greenwich Village	Anita Cunningham	
1980	Foxes	Mrs. Axman	
1980	Resurrection	Kathy	
1981	Four Friends	Mrs. Carnahan	
1983	Reuben, Reuben	Mare Spofford	
1984	Reckless	Mrs. Prescott	
1986	Twisted	Helen Giles	
1987	Black Widow	Sara	
1987	Fatal Attraction	Martha	
1988	Midnight Run	Helen Nelson	
1990	Green Card	Brontë's Parent	
1991	Hard Promises	Mrs. Bell	
1991	Fried Green Tomatoes	Mama Threadgoode	
1993	Falling Down	D-Fens' Mother	
1994	Holy Matrimony	Orna	
1995	How to Make an American Quilt	Sophia	
1995	Dead Man Walking	Helen's Mother	
1996	Twister	Meg Greene	
1996	Larger than Life	Luluna	
1997	Hudson River Blues	Julia	
1998	Trance	Mrs. Ferriter	
1999	Tumbleweeds	Ginger	
2001	The Pledge	Helen Jackson	
2001	Powder Keg	Mother	Segment: The Hire
2002	Minority Report	Dr. Iris Hineman	
2002	The Laramie Project	Lucy Thompson	
2003	A Foreign Affair	Ma Adams	
2003	Red Betsy	Helen Rounds	
2004	The Best Thief in the World	Helen	
2004	Iron Jawed Angels	Rev. Dr. Anna Howard Shaw	
2004	P.S.	Ellie Silverstein	
2005	Sweet Land	Old Inge	
2006	Little Fugitive	Social Worker	
2006	Hollywoodland	Helen Bessolo	
2006	Griffin & Phoenix	Dr. Imberman	
2007	Turn the River	Abby	
2008	Diminished Capacity	Belle Tyke	
2008	Killshot	Lenore	
2009	A Dog Year	Lois Blair	
2010	Please Give	Mrs. Portman	
2011	Roadie	Mom	
2012	The Odd Life of Timothy Green	Aunt Mel	
2013	Two Altars and a Cave	Helena	Short film
2015	Run All Night	Margaret Conlon	
2016	The Nice Guys	Mrs. Glenn	
2016	The Comedian	Miriam	
2017	Marjorie Prime	Marjorie	
2017	Lady Bird	Sister Sarah Joan	
2020	Uncle Frank	Aunt Butch	
2020	Tesla	The Grand Dame	
2021	The French Dispatch	Upshur "Maw" Clampette	
2022	Mack & Rita	Betty	
2024	The Uninvited	Helen	
2025	On the End	Trudie Ferreira	
TBA	The Steel Harp	Hanna	Post-production

=== Television ===
Year	Title	Role	Notes
1951	Love of Life	Mrs. Bendarik	
1953	Pond's Theatre	Performer	Episode: "The Apple Tree"
1954	Studio One	Barbara Sparling	Episode: "Jack Sperling, Forty-six"
1955	Star Tonight	Performer	2 episodes
1955	Justice	Performer	Episode: "The Girl Without a Name"
1955	Robert Montgomery Presents	Jenny Lind	Episode: "The Second Day of Christmas"
1956	The United States Steel Hour	Felicia Chinik - Jeannie	2 episodes
1957–58	Matinee Theater	Performer	2 episodes
1958	The Ed Sullivan Show	Actor - Scene from Edwin Booth	Episode: #12.15
1959	Startime	Cindy	Episode: "Cindy's Fella"
1960	Strindberg on Love	Miss Julie	Television movie
1960	The Master Builder	Hilda	Television movie
1960	The Play of the Week	Hilde Wangel - Miss Julie	2 episodes
1960	The Art Carney Special	Lena	Episode: "Victory"
1960	DuPont Show of the Month	Barbara Dennin	Episode: "Men in White"
1961	The Loretta Young Show	Jenny Musgrave	Episode: "When Queens Ride By"
1961	'Way Out	Performer	Episode: "The Sisters"
1961	Naked City	Dawn Garrison	Episode: "Strike a Statue"
1962	The Defenders	Esther Terranova	Episode: "The Invisible Badge"
1963	Dr. Kildare	Libby Clayton	Episode: "To Each His Own Prison"
1961–64	Route 66	Various	4 episodes
1964	The Eleventh Hour	Jane Wells	Episode: "A Pattern of Sundays"
1967	CBS Playhouse	Evelyn	Episode: "Do Not Go in Gentle to That Goodnight"
1970	Dragon Country	Performer	Television movie
1972	Particular Men	Anne Starr	Television movie
1972–74	Somerset	Zoe Cannell	Unknown episodes
1975–77	The Doctors	Eleanor Conrad	253 episodes
1978	Stacey	Stacey	Television movie
1980	The Jilting of Granny Weatherall	Cornelia	Television movie
1981	The House of Mirth	Bertha Dorset	Television movie
1982	ABC Afterschool Special	Margaret	Episode: "The Unforgivable Secret"
1982–83	Another World	Ella Fitz	2 episodes
1983	Rage of Angels	Clara	Television special
1984	The Edge of Night	Mrs. Oakes	2 episodes
1984	Tales of the Unexpected	Sara	Episode: "Proxy"
1985	Becoming Helen Keller	Anne Sullivan (older)	Documentary, American Masters
1985	The Execution of Raymond Graham	Mary Neal	Television movie
1985	Doubletake	Sarah	Parts 1 & 2
1986	Adam's Apple	Dora Adams	Television movie
1985	The Equalizer	Marie Ganucci	Episode: "The Confirmation Day"
1987	The Equalizer	Dorothy Hermes	Episode: "Coal Black Soul"
1988	Spenser: For Hire	Elsie	Episode: "Haunting"
1991	Good Sports	Mrs. Tanen	Episode: "Pros and Ex-Cons"
1991	American Playhouse	Ma Joad	Episode: "The Grapes of Wrath"
1991	Thirtysomething	Mrs. Warren	Episode: "The Wedding"
1991	Switched at Birth	Margaret	Miniseries
1991	White Hot: The Mysterious Murder of Thelma Todd	Alice Todd	Television movie
1992	Keep the Change	Lureen	Television movie
1992	Deadly Matrimony	Performer	Television movie
1993	Skylark	Lou Wheaton	Television movie
1993	Missing Persons	Mrs. Halloran	Episode: "Sometimes You Can't Help Getting Involved"
1995	Truman	Madge Wallace Gates	Television movie
1997	Frasier	Moira	Episode: "Roz's Krantz & Gouldenstein Are Dead"
1997	The Practice	Mary Beth Berluti	Episode: "The Civil Right"
1998	A Will of Their Own	Miss Maude	Episode: #1.01
2000	Just Shoot Me!	Libby	Episode: "When Nina Met Her Parents"
2001	Going to California	Beatrice Graf	Episode: "Apocalypse Cow"
2002	The Laramie Project	Lucy Thompson	Television movie
2002	Law & Order: Special Victims Unit	Rebecca Tolliver	Episode: "Competence"
2002	Touched by an Angel	Mildred Mancini	Episode: "A Rock and a Hard Place"
2003–04	One Life to Live	Betsy Cramer	15 episodes
2004	Iron Jawed Angels	Anna Shaw	Television movie
2004	Law & Order: Criminal Intent	Betty Bennett	Episode: "The Saint"
2004	LAX	Rose Sinclair	Episode: "Credible Threat"
2004	Cold Case	Fanny	Episode: "Factory Girls"
2005	Law & Order	Mrs. Varick	Episode: "Sport of Kings"
2006	Grey's Anatomy	Mrs. Dickerson	Episode: "From a Whisper to a Scream"
2007	ER	Gracie	4 episodes
2008–14	True Blood	Adele Stackhouse	12 episodes
2009	Army Wives	Elsie	Episode: "As Time Goes By"
2010	Desperate Housewives	Allison Scavo	2 episodes
2012	Ruth & Erica	Ruth	7 episodes
2012	Dark Horse	Mrs. Ruth	Television movie
2015	The Americans	Betty Turner	Episode: "Do Mail Robots Dream of Electric Sheep?"
2017	The Affair	Mrs. Gunther	Episode: #3.07
2017	The Blacklist	Lucy Game	Episode: "The Architect"
2017	Grace and Frankie	Mrs. Hanson	2 episodes
2017	Younger	Belinda Lacroix	Episode: "In the Pink"
2017	9JKL	Wrong Nana	Episode: "Make Thanksgiving Great Again"
2018	Sneaky Pete	Reverend Ethel Landry	2 episodes
2018	Impulse	Deidre 'Dippy' Jones	Episode: "The Eagle and the Bee"
2019	The Village	Velma	Pilot
2019	Mom	Claire	Episode: "Triple Dip and an Overhand Grip"
2019	The Son	Jeanne Anne McCullough	5 episodes
2019	On Becoming a God in Central Florida	Mimi Waldenstock	2 episodes
2019–20	Ray Donovan	Dolores	4 episodes
2023	This Fool	Beverly Engelbartson	1 episode
2024	Law & Order: Organized Crime	Mama	Episodes "Semper Fi","Crossroads","Redcoat"
2025	Elsbeth	Delores Feinn	season 3 episode 5 "Poetic Justice"

== Theatre ==
=== Broadway ===
Year	Title	Role	Venue	Ref.
1952	Time Out for Ginger	Joan	Lyceum Theatre	
1955	The Wisteria Trees	Antoinette	New York City Center	
1955	The Young and Beautiful	Josephine Perry	Longacre Theatre	
1957	Orpheus Descending	Carol Cutrere	Martin Beck Theatre	
1958	Edwin Booth	Mary Devlin	46th Street Theatre	
1963	Bicyle Ride to Nevada	Lucha Moreno	Cort Theatre	
1973	The Iceman Cometh	Cora	Circle in the Square	
1978	Stages	Various	Belasco Theatre	
1990	The Grapes of Wrath	Ma Joad	Cort Theatre	
1996	Buried Child	Halie	Brooks Atkinson Theatre	
2019–20	The Inheritance - Part II	Margaret	Ethel Barrymore Theatre	

=== Off Broadway and regional ===
Year	Title	Role	Venue
1956	The Glass Menagerie	Laura Wingfield	New York City Center
1970	Sunday Dinner	Mary	American Place Theatre, Off-Broadway
1972	Present Tense	Various	Sheridan Square Playhouse, Off-Broadway
1978	Touching Bottom	Performer	American Place Theatre, Off-Broadway
1982	The Front Page	Mollie Malloy	Long Wharf Theatre Mainstage, CT
1985	The Vienna Notes	Rivers	Second Stage Theater, Off-Broadway
1986	Brighton Beach Memoirs	Blanche Morton	ACT, A Contemporary Theater, Seattle
1987	Bodies, Rest and Motion	Mrs. Dotson	Lincoln Center Theatre, Off-Broadway
1987	The Stick Wife	Jessie Bliss	Hartford Stage, CT
1988	The Grapes of Wrath	Performer	Steppenwolf Theatre Company, Chicago
1989	Measure for Measure	Mistress Overdone	Lincoln Center Theatre, Off-Broadway
1989	Beside Herself	Mary	Circle Repertory Theatre, Off-Broadway
1992	Dog Logic	Anita	The American Place Theatre, NY
1993	Escape from Happiness	Nora	Yale Repertory Theatre, CT
1994	The Mesmerist	Performer	Steppenwolf Theatre Company, Chicago
1995	Buried Child	Halie	Steppenwolf Theatre Company, Chicago
1997	Defying Gravity	Betty	The American Place Theatre, Off-Broadway
1998	Impossible Marriage	Kendall Kingsley	Laura Pels Theatre, Off-Broadway
1999–2000	Give Me Your Answer, Do!	Maggie Donovan	Roundabout Theatre Company, Off-Broadway
2001	Mother Courage and Her Children	Performer	Steppenwolf Theatre Company, Chicago
2005	Absolute Hell	Julia Shillitoe	Roundabout Theatre Company Stage Reading
2005–06	The Trip to Bountiful	Mrs. Carrie Watts	Signature Theatre Company, Off-Broadway
2007	100 Saints You Should Know	Colleen	Playwrights Horizons, Off-Broadway
2008	The Trip to Bountiful	Carrie Watts	Goodman Theatre, Chicago
2009	The Tempest	Gonzalo	Steppenwolf Theatre Company, Chicago
2009	Dividing the State	Stella Gordon	Hartford Stage, CT
2010	Lil's 90th	Lil	Long Wharf Theatre, CT
2010	After the Revolution	Vera Joseph	Williamstown Theatre Festival, MA
2010	After the Revolution	Vera Joseph	Playwrights Horizons, Off-Broadway
2011	The Illusion	Alcandre	Signature Theatre Company, Off-Broadway
2012	Heartless	Mable	Signature Theatre Company, Off-Broadway
2013	The Old Friends	Mamie Borden	Signature Theatre Company, Off-Broadway
2014	Marjorie Prime	Marjorie	Mark Taper Forum, CA
2015	The Herd	Patricia	Steppenwolf Theatre Company, Chicago
2015	John	Genevieve	Signature Theatre Company, NY
2015–16	Marjorie Prime	Marjorie	Playwrights Horizons, Off-Broadway
2018	Peace for Mary Frances	Mary Frances	The Alice Griffin Jewel Box Theatre, Off-Broadway
2018	I Was Most Alive With You	Carla	Playwrights Horizons, Off-Broadway

== Awards and nominations ==
Year	Award	Category	Nominated work	Result	Ref.
1970	New York Film Critics Circle	Best Supporting Actress	Five Easy Pieces	Nominated	
1971	Laurel Awards	Best Female Supporting Performance	Five Easy Pieces	Nominated	
1990	Tony Awards	Best Featured Actress in a Play	The Grapes of Wrath	Nominated	
1996	Tony Awards	Best Featured Actress in a Play	Buried Child	Nominated	
1996	Screen Actors Guild Awards	Outstanding Performance by a Cast in a Motion Picture	How to Make an American Quilt	Nominated	
2006	Drama Desk Awards	Outstanding Actress in a Play	The Trip to Bountiful	Won	
2006	Drama League Awards	Distinguished Performance	The Trip to Bountiful	Nominated	
2006	Lucille Lortel Awards	Outstanding Lead Actress in a Play	The Trip to Bountiful	Nominated	
2006	Obie Awards	Distinguished Performance by an Actress	The Trip to Bountiful	Won	
2008	Drama League Awards	Distinguished Performance	100 Saints You Should Know	Nominated	
2010	Gotham Awards	Best Ensemble Cast	Please Give	Nominated	
2011	Independent Spirit Awards	Robert Altman Award	Please Give	Won	
2013	Critics' Choice Television Awards	Best Guest Performer in a Drama Series	The Americans	Nominated	
2013	Obie Awards	Sustained Excellence of Performance		Won	
2016	Drama League Awards	Distinguished Performance	Marjorie Prime and John	Nominated	
2017	Screen Actors Guild Awards	Outstanding Performance by a Cast in a Motion Picture	Lady Bird	Nominated	
2017	Las Vegas Film Critics Society	Lifetime Achievement Award	—N/a	Won	
2017	Windsor International Film Festival	Lifetime Achievement Award	—N/a	Won	
2017	Gotham Awards	Best Actress	Marjorie Prime	Nominated	
2018	Independent Spirit Awards	Best Supporting Female	Marjorie Prime	Nominated	
2018	Satellite Awards	Best Supporting Actress – Motion Picture	Marjorie Prime	Won	
2020	Drama Desk Awards	Outstanding Featured Actress in a Play	The Inheritance	Won	
2020	Tony Awards	Best Featured Actress in a Play	The Inheritance	Won	
