= Jordan Harrison (playwright) =

American dramatist

- Born: 1977 (age 48–49); Bainbridge Island, Washington, U.S.
- Education: Stanford University (BA); Brown University (MFA)

Jordan Harrison (born 1977) is an American playwright. He grew up on Bainbridge Island, Washington. He is primarily known for his plays Marjorie Prime, a finalist for the 2015 Pulitzer Prize for Drama which was revived on Broadway in 2025, and The Antiquities in 2025.

== Biography ==
Harrison was born in Bainbridge Island, Washington, a rural suburb of Seattle. He received a B.A. from Stanford University in 1999 and an M.F.A. from Brown University, where he studied with Paula Vogel. He lives in Brooklyn, New York. While attending Brown, Harrison began writing Kid-Simple, the story of a girl genius who listens to a radio serial. The production was first was presented at the Actors Theatre of Louisville in 2004. The Actors Theatre of Louisville subsequently premiered his plays Act a Lady and Maple and Vine, both of which were directed by Anne Kauffman, and The Grown-Up, which was directed by Ken Rus Schmoll.Act a Lady, after being developed at the PlayPenn New Play Conference in 2005, was subsequently produced in several venues including the New Conservatory Theatre Center, San Francisco in April 2009.

Harrison's next play, The Museum Play, followed the bizarre ongoings of a natural history museum, had workshops at Brown University (2003), readings at Playwrights Horizons (2003) and Signature Theatre Company (2005) and a production at Red Eye Theatre, Minneapolis (2004). Finn in the Underworld premiered at Berkeley Repertory Theatre, California, in 2005, directed by Les Waters.

In 2010, Arden Theatre Company premiered The Flea and the Professor, with music composed by Richard Gray and lyrics by Harrison and Gray. The musical was commissioned by the Virginia and Harvey Kimmel Arts Education Fund of the Philadelphia Foundation and received an award from the National Endowment for the Arts. It was performed by the Arden Theatre Company, Philadelphia, Pennsylvania in May to June 2011, directed by Anne Kauffman.

He also wrote the book and lyrics for the musical Suprema, with music and lyrics by Daniel Zaitchik. The musical had a reading at Ars Nova in May 2012, directed by Leigh Silverman after being developed at the Eugene O'Neill Theater Center's 2011 Music Theatre Conference.

In 2018, he premiered his new play, The Amateurs, at the Vineyard Theatre. The show began previews on February 8, 2018, and closed on March 29, 2018. Directed by Oliver Butler the play featured Kyle Beltran, Quincy Tyler Bernstine, Michael Cyril Creighton, Greg Keller, Jennifer Kim and Thomas Jay Ryan. The play received strong reviews, with The New York Times calling it "slightly eggheaded and strangely moving."

His other Off-Broadway credits include Doris to Darlene, produced in 2007, Maple and Vine in 2011, and Log Cabin in 2018, all produced at Playwrights Horizons. . His 2025 play, The Antiquities was nominated for an Outer Critics Circle Award for its Off-Broadway run at Playwrights Horizons, and its Chicago production, presented at Goodman Theatre, was nominated for two Jeff Awards, for the production's ensemble and Harrison for the New Work - Libby Adler Mages Award.

=== Marjorie Prime ===
Among his most notable plays is Marjorie Prime, which deals with themes of artificial intelligence, with Playbill calling it "a sly and surprising work about technology and artificial intelligence told through images and ideas that resonate.". The show premiered at the Center Theatre Group Mark Taper Forum in Los Angeles, California, in September 2014, under the direction of Les Waters. The play featured Lois Smith as "Marjorie", Lisa Emery as "Tess", her daughter, Frank Wood as "Jon", Tess's husband, and Jeff Ward as "Walter", a computer-programmed, pixel-generated companion.

The play had a reading at the South Coast Repertory's 2013 Pacific Playwrights Festival on April 28, 2013, directed by Pam MacKinnon, before premiering Off-Broadway in 2015 at Playwrights Horizons to critical acclaim. The show received the 2016 Horton Foote Prize for Outstanding New American Play,, and being nominated for two Drama League Awards and a Lucille Lortel Award.

The play has been adapted for a film, written and directed by Michael Almereyda. The film stars Tim Robbins (Jon), Jon Hamm (Walter), Geena Davis (Tess) and Lois Smith. Principal photography began in October 2015. The film premiered at the 2017 Sundance Film Festival (Park City, Utah) in January 2017. The film won the Sloan Feature Film Prize at the Sundance Film Festival; the prize includes a $20,000 cash award.

In 2025, the play was revived on Broadway by Second Stage Theatre, starring June Squibb in the titular role and directed by Anne Kauffman. The production also starred Cynthia Nixon, Danny Burstein and Christopher Lowell. The show opened on November 20, 2025 at the Helen Hayes Theatre, and closed on February 15, 2026, after 17 previews and 79 performances. The production received critical acclaim, with The New York Times praising the show's timely themes, writing "the show rustles up more questions — and stirs up more trouble — than it did 10 years ago." Squibb and Burstein were both nominated for 2026 Tony Awards for their performances.

== Plays and productions ==
- Fit for Feet (2003)
- Kid-Simple (2004)
- The Museum Play (2004)
- Finn in the Underworld (2005)
- Act a Lady (2006)
- Doris to Darlene, A Cautionary Valentine (2007)
- Amazons and their Men (2008)
- Futura (2010)
- Maple and Vine (2011)
- The Flea and the Professor (2011)
- Suprema (2012)
- The Grown-Up (2014)
- Marjorie Prime (2014) - Finalist for the 2015 Pulitzer Prize for Drama
- The Amateurs (2018)
- Log Cabin (2018)
- The Antiquities (2025)

== Awards and honors ==
Harrison attended the Sundance Institute Playwrights Retreat at the Ucross Foundation in February 2007. He received a Kesselring Fellowship in 2007, presented by the National Arts Club. He received the Hodder Fellowship from Princeton University in 2009. He was awarded a Guggenheim Fellowship in 2009. He received the Jerome (2004) and McKnight Fellowships (2005) from The Playwrights' Center, Minneapolis, Minnesota.

He was also awarded the Roe Green Award, Cleveland Play House in 2013, which included a grant of $7,500, a weeklong residency and a public reading. He has also received the NEA/TCG Playwright-in-Residence Grant at the Empty Space Theatre in Seattle, Washington.

=== Awards and nominations ===
Year	Award	Category	Work	Result	Ref.
2003	Actors Theatre of Louisville	Heideman Award	Fit for Feet	Won	
2007	GLAAD Media Award	Los Angeles Theatre	Act a Lady	Nominated	
2011	Barrymore Award	Outstanding Overall Production of a Musical	The Flea and the Professor	Won	
2015	Pulitzer Prize for Drama		Marjorie Prime	Nominated	
2016	Drama League Award	Outstanding Production of a Play	Marjorie Prime	Nominated	
2025	Drama League Award	Outstanding Production of a Play	The Antiquities	Nominated	
2025	Jeff Award	New Work (The Libby Adler Mages Award)	The Antiquities	Nominated	
2025	Outer Critics Circle Award	Outstanding New Off-Broadway Play	The Antiquities	Nominated	
2026	Outer Critics Circle Award	Outstanding Revival of a Play	Marjorie Prime	Nominated	
