= Love Language (film) =

2026 film by Joey Power

- Release poster
- Directed by: Joey Power
- Written by: Joey Power
- Produced by: Ari Lubet; Colin Jost; Jeff Grosvenor; Bert Hamelinck; Allison Hironaka
- Starring: Chloë Grace Moretz; Anthony Ramos; Manny Jacinto; Isabel May; Lukas Gage; Billie Lourd
- Cinematography: Andrew Wehde
- Edited by: Jennifer Vecchiarello
- Music by: Jeff Morrow
- Production companies: 3 Arts Entertainment; No Notes Productions; Caviar
- Distributed by: Vertical
- Release dates: March 16, 2026 (SXSW); October 23, 2026 (United States)
- Running time: 104 minutes
- Country: United States
- Language: English

Love Language is a 2026 American romantic comedy film written and directed by Joey Power. It stars Chloë Grace Moretz, Anthony Ramos, Manny Jacinto, Isabel May, Lukas Gage, and Billie Lourd.

The film had its world premiere at the 2026 South by Southwest Film & TV Festival on March 16, 2026 and was released theatrically on October 23, 2026.

== Cast ==
- Chloë Grace Moretz as Lou
- Anthony Ramos as Dash
- Manny Jacinto as Warren
- Isabel May as Olivia
- Lukas Gage as Gus
- Billie Lourd as Tilda
- Chloe Fineman as Marion
- Bobbi Althoff as Genji
- Morgan Jay as Ufberg
- Dan Perrault as Dave
- Zach Zucker as Teddy
- Marchánt Davis as Steven
- Daniel David Stewart as Graham
- Stephen Schneider as Driving Instructor
- Christian Pierce as Kevin the Stripper
- Conner Stumm as Dave

== Production ==
=== Casting ===
Chloë Grace Moretz, Anthony Ramos, Manny Jacinto, Isabel May, Lukas Gage, and Billie Lourd joined the cast on October 15, 2024. Chloe Fineman, Bobbi Althoff, Morgan Jay, Stephen Schneider, Dan Perrault, Zach Zucker, Christian Pierce, Marchánt Davis, and Daniel David Stewart joined the cast on December 4, 2024.

=== Filming ===
Principal photography began in Chicago in late 2024.

== Release ==
Love Language premiered at the 2026 South by Southwest Film & TV Festival on March 16, 2026. The film was released by Vertical on October 23, 2026.

== Reception ==
On the review aggregator website Rotten Tomatoes, 68% of 22 critics' reviews are positive, with an average rating of 6.3/10.
