= William Eggleston in the Real World =

2005 American documentary film

- Film poster
- Directed by: Michael Almereyda
- Written by: Michael Almereyda
- Produced by: Michael Almereyda; Jesse Dylan; Anthony Katagas
- Starring: William Eggleston; Tristán Ulloa; Najwa Nimri; Daniel Freire; Elena Anaya
- Cinematography: Kiko de la Rica
- Edited by: Karen Choy; Joshua Falcon; Johannes Weuthen
- Music by: Simon Fisher Turner
- Distributed by: Palm Pictures (United States); Grasshopper Film (DVD)
- Release date: August 31, 2005
- Running time: 86 minutes
- Country: United States
- Language: English

William Eggleston in the Real World is a documentary film about the photographer William Eggleston directed by Michael Almereyda and released in 2005.

== Details ==
The film reveals the deep connection between William Eggleston's personality and his work, and also reveals his parallel commitments as a musician, draftsman and videographer. The film follows Eggleston on trips to Kentucky, Los Angeles, New York City and Memphis, where Eggleston lives.

The film was nominated for a Gotham Award for Best Documentary from the Independent Filmmaker Project at the Gotham Awards 2005.

Heather Parks and James Patterson were associate producers; Donald Rosenfeld and Alexis Zoullas were executive producers.
