= Escapes (film) =

2017 documentary film

- Directed by: Michael Almereyda
- Written by: Michael Almereyda
- Produced by: Michael Almereyda
- Starring: Hampton Fancher
- Edited by: Piibe Kolka
- Production company: Survival Media
- Distributed by: Grasshopper Film
- Release date: July 26, 2017; (USA)
- Running time: 89 minutes
- Country: United States
- Language: English
- Box office: $17,778

Escapes is a 2017 documentary film about the life of flamenco dancer, actor, and Blade Runner screenwriter Hampton Fancher directed by Michael Almereyda.

== Reception ==
Ryan Swen of seattlescreenscene.com called the film "quietly spectacular, stylish, and moving."

Ray Pride of newcityfilm.com called the film a "captivating experimental interview documentary".

Hunter Lanier of filmthreat.com describes the documentary's style, explaining that "Almereyda chooses to fill the screen with clips from various films and TV shows that match the beats in Fancher’s story" and criticizing this technique for being "both distracting and narratively impotent."
