= John Lilly and the Earth Coincidence Control Office =

- Film poster
- Directed by: Michael Almereyda; Courtney Stephens
- Written by: Michael Almereyda; Courtney Stephens
- Produced by: Michael Almereyda; Taylor Hess; Jesse Miller; Courtney Stephens
- Narrated by: Chloë Sevigny
- Edited by: Max Bowens; Iva Radivojevic; Courtney Stephens
- Production company: Couple 3 Films
- Distributed by: Oscilloscope
- Release dates: February 3, 2025 (IFFR); March 27, 2026
- Running time: 89 minutes
- Country: United States
- Language: English
- Box office: $21,437

John Lilly and the Earth Coincidence Control Office is a 2025 American documentary film which explores the life and work of John C. Lilly. It was directed by Michael Almereyda and Courtney Stephens. The film premiered at the 54th International Film Festival Rotterdam in 2025. It was released in New York City on March 27, 2026.

== Reception ==
On the review aggregator website Rotten Tomatoes, 70% of 10 critics' reviews are positive, with an average rating of 7.5/10.

Vadim Rizov of Filmmaker wrote, "One of Coincidence Control's clear takeaways is that universal reverence for dolphins and whales, and how their preservation became a stand-in for caring about the environment as a whole, is a direct and uncomplicatedly laudable part of Lilly's legacy."

Clint Worthington of RogerEbert.com gave the film three out of four stars and wrote that it's "a curious work of deadpan collage that feels the closest you could come to actually experiencing Lilly's experiments in documentary form."
