= June Squibb =

American actress (born 1929)

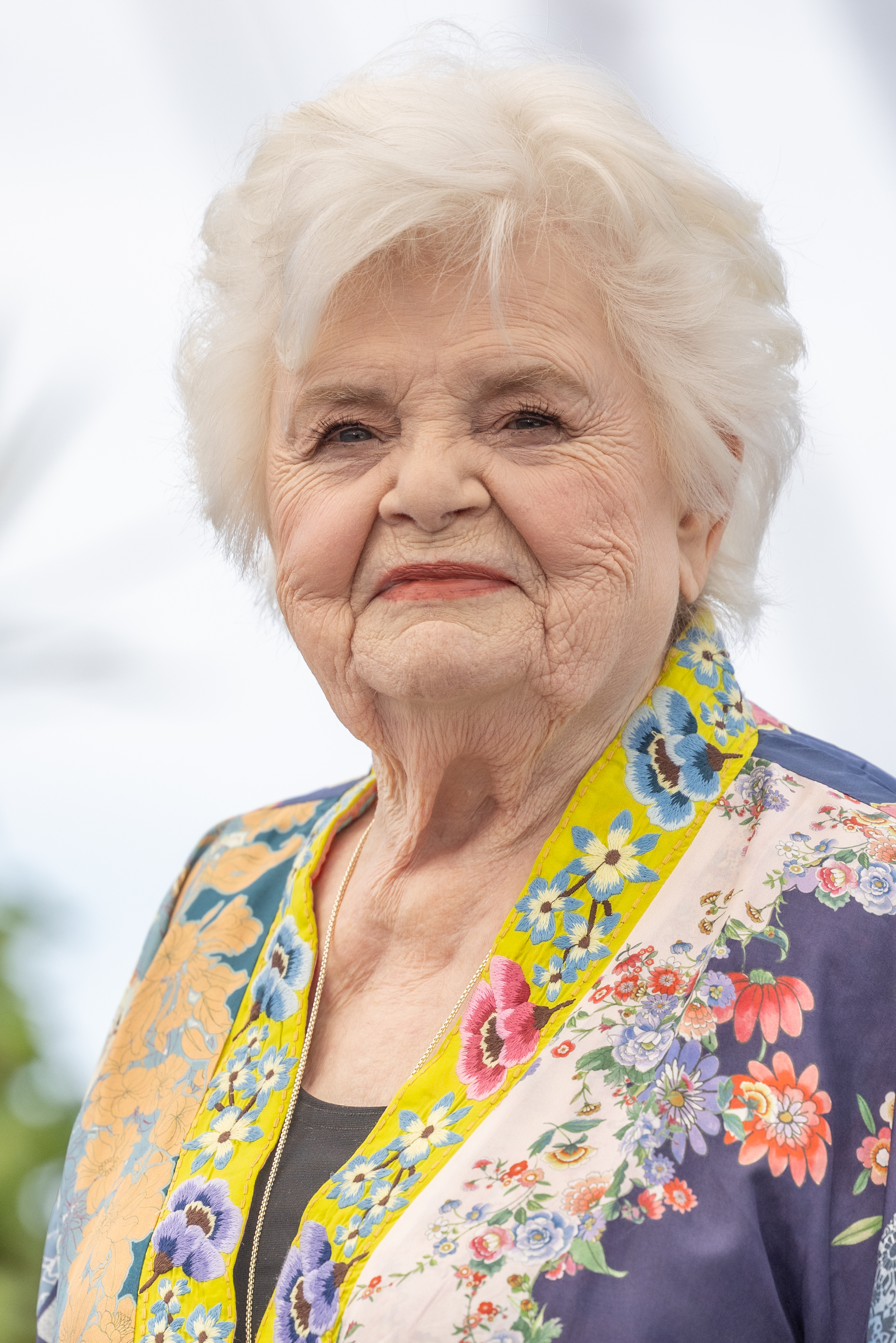
- Squibb at the 2025 Cannes Film Festival
- Born: June Louise Squibb; November 6, 1929 (age 96); Vandalia, Illinois, U.S.
- Education: Whittier College (attended)
- Occupation: Actress
- Years active: 1947–present
- Spouses: Edward Sostek (m. 1953; div. 1959); Charles Kakatsakis (m. 1959; died 1999)
- Children: 1

June Louise Squibb (born November 6, 1929) is an American actress. She began her career by making her Broadway debut in the musical Gypsy (1959). Her film debut was in Woody Allen's romantic comedy Alice (1990). She later had supporting roles in the films The Age of Innocence (1993), In & Out (1997), Meet Joe Black (1998), About Schmidt (2002), and Far from Heaven (2002). For her role in Alexander Payne's road film Nebraska (2013), she was nominated for the Academy Award for Best Supporting Actress.

Squibb starred in the action comedy film Thelma (2024) and the comedy-drama Eleanor the Great (2025). She also voiced characters in the animated films Ralph Breaks the Internet (2018), Toy Story 4 (2019), Soul (2020), Inside Out 2 (2024), and Zootopia 2 (2025). She returned to the Broadway stage in 2025 in a revival of the Jordan Harrison play Marjorie Prime for which she was nominated for the Tony Award for Best Featured Actress in a Play.

== Early and personal life ==
Squibb was born in Vandalia, Illinois. Squibb married Edward Sostek in 1953; they divorced in 1959. Later that same year, she married acting teacher Charles Kakatsakis. They had a son, Harry, a filmmaker who directed the short film Admissions. In the 1950s, Squibb converted to Judaism. When asked about ageism in show business, she said, "Well, it's like anything else. I always feel, rules are meant to be broken."

== Career ==
=== Early appearances ===
Squibb worked at The Muny and trained with HB Studio. In 1951, she moved to Cleveland to sing and dance at the Cleveland Play House and starred in productions such as Marseilles, The Play's the Thing, Goodbye, My Fancy, The Heiress, Detective Story, Antigone, Ladies in Retirement and Bloomer Girl. In the late 1950s, she and her second husband, Charles Kakatsakis, moved to New York City to pursue careers on Broadway.

In 1958, she played Dulcie in the off-Broadway The Boy Friend and starred in the 1959 Off-Broadway revival of Lend an Ear. She replaced Electra for her Broadway debut in the original production of Gypsy: A Musical Fable. Squibb appeared in the 1968 Broadway version of The Happy Time. The musical was nominated for the Tony Award for Best Musical. She did modeling work for romance novels, and performed on road tours and cruise ships, and worked as Santa Claus’s helper at Christmas in the shopping malls.

In 1985, Squibb received her SAG/AFTRA card after appearing in an episode of CBS Schoolbreak Special. In 1990, she made her big screen debut playing a supporting role in the romantic comedy film Alice by Woody Allen. In the 1990s, Squibb played supporting and minor parts in the films Scent of a Woman (1992), The Age of Innocence (1993), In & Out (1997) and Meet Joe Black (1998). In 2020, she appeared in the 1995 Broadway play Sacrilege. On television, she had a recurring role in the ABC daytime soap opera All My Children and made guest starring appearances on prime time series, such as Law & Order, ER, Just Shoot Me!, Judging Amy, Two and a Half Men and Curb Your Enthusiasm.

In 2002, Squibb co-starred opposite Jack Nicholson in the comedy-drama film About Schmidt playing his wife. After this role, she appeared in films Far from Heaven (2002), Welcome to Mooseport (2004), and Just Add Water (2008). From 2005 to 2007, she had a recurring role in the CBS crime series Ghost Whisperer, and from 2008 to 2009 played Pearl on the CBS soap opera, The Young and the Restless. She also appeared in the made-for-television films A Stranger's Heart (2007) and Shark Swarm (2008) and guest-starred on The Middle, Castle and Mike & Molly. In 2011, she played Stella Gordon in Dividing the Estate at the Dallas Theater Center and received standout reviews.

=== Breakthrough ===
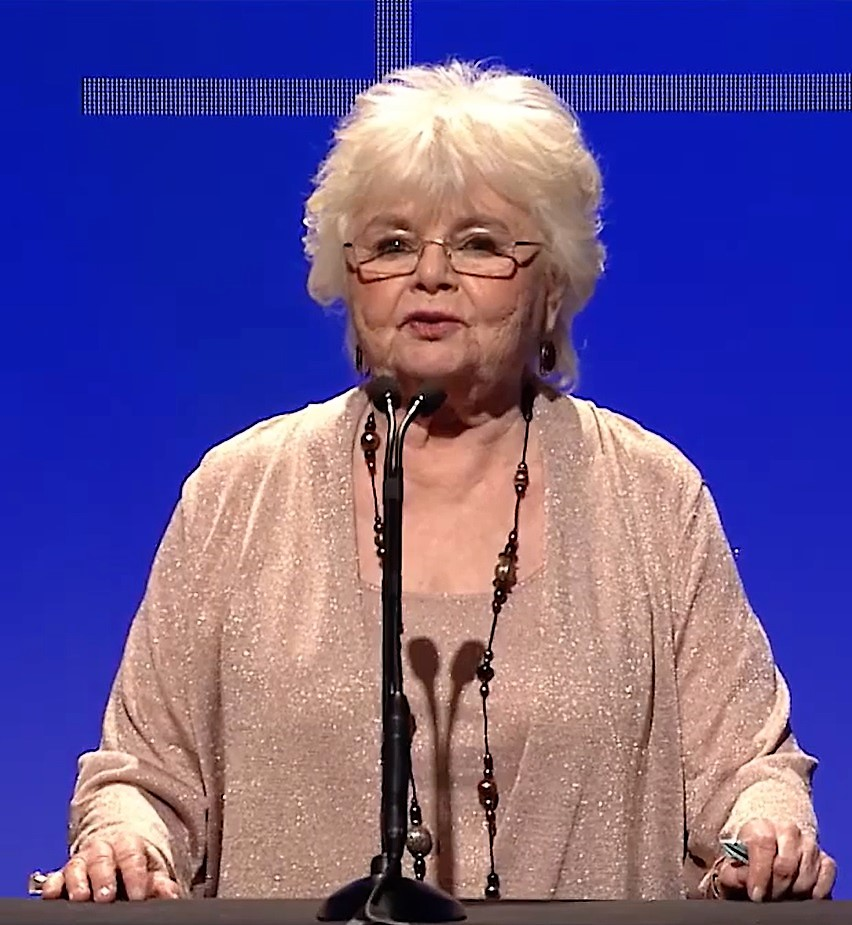
Squibb at the Art Directors Guild 18th Award Show in 2014

In 2013, Squibb starred opposite Bruce Dern in the road comedy-drama film Nebraska, directed by Alexander Payne. She received positive reviews for her performance. Film critic Christy Lemire from RogerEbert.com called her a "scene-stealer", while Peter Travers from the Rolling Stone called her "priceless". She received Boston Society of Film Critics Award for Best Supporting Actress and Satellite Award for Best Supporting Actress – Motion Picture, as well as being nominated for an Academy Award for Best Supporting Actress, a Golden Globe Award for Best Supporting Actress – Motion Picture, the Screen Actors Guild Award for Outstanding Performance by a Female Actor in a Supporting Role and the Independent Spirit Award for Best Supporting Female among other accolades for the film.

Following her big break, Squibb guest-starred on Girls, Glee, Devious Maids, Mom and Getting On. She was inducted into the Cleveland Play House Hall of Fame in 2016.

In 2015, Squibb starred opposite Blythe Danner in the comedy-drama film I'll See You in My Dreams. Later that year, she appeared in the Christmas comedy-drama Love the Coopers. In 2016, she guest-starred on The Big Bang Theory as Sheldon's grandmother. Later that year, she had a recurring role as Etta Teasdale in the Showtime comedy-drama series Shameless. In 2017, she guest-starred alongside Hal Holbrook on Grey's Anatomy.

She also appeared in the films Other People (2016), Father Figures (2017), Blow the Man Down (2019), Palm Springs (2020), Hubie Halloween (2020), The Humans (2021) and Family Squares (2022). She played Old Josie in the 2018 Broadway production of Waitress. She had a supporting role in the Disney+ fantasy film Godmothered in 2020.

She played Vivian, the grandmother of Eddie Palmer (Justin Timberlake), in Apple TV+ 2021 film Palmer. From 2018 to 2019, she had a recurring role in the NBC crime comedy-drama Good Girls. She also played Mrs. Danforth, a rich benefactor, in "The Indoor Arm", the final episode of the second season of the Apple TV+ series Little America.

In 2024, Squibb had her first leading role, in the action comedy film Thelma. It received mostly positive reviews from critics. Mae Abdulbaki wrote in her Screen Rant review: "June Squibb proves she's still on top of her acting game in an energetic, charming adventure comedy that is actually genuinely funny." That same year, she appeared in the black comedy Don't Tell Mom the Babysitter's Dead. Squibb starred in another leading role in Scarlett Johansson's directorial debut film Eleanor the Great.

In 2026, she was nominated for the Tony Award for Best Featured Actress in a Play for her performance in Marjorie Prime, which made her the oldest ever Tony Award acting nominee, at age 96. In September that same year, it was announced that Squibb had been cast in the upcoming sports comedy Hot Rollers.

== Acting credits ==
=== Film ===
Year	Title	Role	Notes
1990	Alice	Hilda	
1992	Scent of a Woman	Mrs. Linda Hunsaker	
1993	The Age of Innocence	Delores	
1997	In & Out	Cousin Gretchen	
1998	Meet Joe Black	Helen	
2002	About Schmidt	Helen Schmidt	
2002	Far from Heaven	Bessie	
2004	Welcome to Mooseport	Irma	
2008	Just Add Water	Mother Mattie	
2011	Atlas Shrugged: Part I	Mrs. Ida Hastings	
2011	The Perfect Family	Mrs. Dawn Punch	
2011	The Big Year	Doris	
2012	The Man Who Shook the Hand of Vicente Fernandez	Irma	
2012	Would You Rather	Linda	
2013	Nebraska	Kate Grant	Academy Award for Best Supporting Actress nomination
2015	I'll See You in My Dreams	Georgina	
2015	A Country Called Home	Judy	
2015	Love the Coopers	Aunt Fishy	
2016	Other People	Ruth-Anne	
2017	Table 19	Jo Flanagan	
2017	Amanda & Jack Go Glamping	Jude	
2017	Father Figures	Agnes Hunt	
2018	Summer '03	Dotty Winkle	
2018	Ralph Breaks the Internet	Jimmy's Grandmother	Voice role
2019	Blow the Man Down	Susie Gallagher	
2019	Toy Story 4	Margaret the Store Owner	Voice role
2020	Palm Springs	Nana Lena Schlieffen	
2020	Hubie Halloween	Mrs. Estelle Dubois	
2020	Soul	Gerel	Voice role
2020	Godmothered	Agnes	
2021	Palmer	Vivian Palmer	
2021	The Humans	Momo	
2022	Family Squares	Mabel	
2024	Thelma	Thelma Post	Also executive producer
2024	Don't Tell Mom the Babysitter's Dead	Carly Sturak	
2024	Inside Out 2	Nostalgia	Voice role
2024	Lost & Found in Cleveland	Gladys Sokolowski	
2025	Eleanor the Great	Eleanor Morgenstein	
2025	Zootopia 2	Gram Gram Hopps	Voice role
TBA	Hot Curlers †	TBA	

=== Television ===
Year	Title	Role	Notes
1985	CBS Schoolbreak Special	Sylvia the Landlady	Episode: "The Day the Senior Class Got Married"
1995; 1999	Law & Order	Sylvia Sherman / Eileen De Rose	2 episodes
2001	Ed	Dr. Bernaman	Episode: "Valentine's Day"
2003–2004	Judging Amy	Louise Flowers	5 episodes
2003	ER	Agnes	Episode: "No Strings Attached"
2003	Just Shoot Me!	Mrs. Nora Pebbles	Episode: "Son of a Preacher Man"
2005	House	Ramona	Episode: "Love Hurts"
2005	The Bernie Mac Show	Sister Rosetta Hamillton	Episode: "Night of Terror"
2005	Two and a Half Men	Margaret	Episode: "Sleep Tight, Puddin' Pop"
2005	Curb Your Enthusiasm	Mrs. Edie Cone	Episode: "The End"
2005–2007	Ghost Whisperer	Grandma Mary-Anne	6 episodes
2006	7th Heaven	Ms. Bessie Rusnak	Episode: "Love and Obsession"
2007	The Bill Engvall Show	Edda	2 episodes
2007	A Stranger's Heart	Aunt Cass	Television film
2008	Cold Case	Annette Hicks	Episode: "Slipping"
2008	The Office	Michael's mother (Voice role)	Episode: "Customer Survey"
2008	Shark Swarm	Bess Wilder	Television film
2008–2009	The Young and the Restless	Pearl	19 episodes
2011	Eagleheart	Esther	Episode: "Once in a Wattle"
2012	Castle	Jamie Isaacson	Episode: "Once Upon a Crime"
2012	Mike & Molly	Francine	Episode: "The Rehearsal"
2013–2015	Getting On	Varla Pounder	3 episodes
2013	The Millers	Blanche	Episode: "Carol's Parents Are Coming to Town"
2014	Girls	Grandma Flo	Episode: "Flo"
2014	Glee	Maggie Banks	Episode: "Old Dog, New Tricks"
2014	Devious Maids	Velma Mudge	2 episodes
2015	The Jack and Triumph Show	June Gregory	7 episodes
2015	7 Days in Hell	Elizabeth II	Television film
2015	Axe Cop	June Esther (voice)	Episode: "The Ultimate Mate"
2015	Wander Over Yonder	Stella Starbella (voice)	Episode: "The Loose Screw"
2015	Mom	Dottie	Episode: "Terrorists and Gingerbread"
2015	Code Black	Dorothy	Episode: "Buen Árbol"
2016	The Big Bang Theory	Constance, Sheldon's 'Meemaw'	Episode: "The Meemaw Materialization"
2016	Shameless	Etta	7 episodes
2016	Modern Family	Auntie Alice	2 episodes
2016	Dream Corp, LLC	Nora	Episode: "The Smoking Nun"
2016	Clarence	Rosie Randell (voice)	Episode: "Cloris"
2017	Bones	Barbara Baker	Episode: "The Final Chapter: The New Tricks in the Old Dogs"
2017	Grey's Anatomy	Elsie Clatch	Episode: "Til I Hear It From You"
2017	I'm Sorry	Diane	Episode: "Pilot"
2018	Living Biblically	Mrs. Mary Jean Murphy	Episode: "Pilot"
2018–2019	Good Girls	Marion Peterson	7 episodes
2019	The Good Doctor	Ida Guelph	Episode: "Trampoline"
2019	Room 104	Jean	Episode: "Crossroads"
2020	Solar Opposites	Ruth (voice)	Episode: "The Unstable Grey Hole"
2020	Little Voice	Mrs. Esther Finch	5 episodes
2020–2021	The Fungies!	Granny Tullabett Grancie (voice)	11 episodes
2021	No Activity	(voice)	Episode: "40 Days & 40 Nights"
2021–2022	Little Ellen	Gramsy (voice)	18 episodes
2022	Life & Beth	Elena	Episode: "Pancakes"
2022	Little America	Mrs. Danforth	Episode: "The Indoor Arm"
2024	Velma	Older Woman (voice)	2 episodes
2024	American Horror Stories	Grams	Episode: "Leprechaun"
2025	Haha, You Clowns	Dory, Ruth (voice)	Episode: "Movie Night"

=== Theater ===
Year	Title	Role	Venue	Ref.
1958	The Boy Friend	Dulcie	Cherry Lane Theatre, Off-Broadway	
1959	Lend an Ear	Ensemble	Renata Theatre, Off-Broadway	
1959	Gypsy	Electra (replacement)	Broadway Theatre, Broadway	
1962	No Shoestrings	Ensemble	Upstairs at the Downstairs, Off-Broadway	
1968	The Happy Time	Felice Bonnard	Broadway Theatre, Broadway	
1976	The Public Good	Ensemble	Playwrights Horizons, Off-Broadway	
1978	Gorey Stories	Mary Rosemarsh	Booth Theatre, Broadway	
1995	Sacrilege	Sister Joseph / Virgilia	Belasco Theatre, Broadway	
2011	Dividing the Estate	Stella	Dallas Theater Center, Regional	
2018	Waitress	Josie (replacement)	Brooks Atkinson Theatre, Broadway	
2025	Marjorie Prime	Marjorie Prime	Helen Hayes Theater, Broadway	

== Awards and nominations ==
Year	Award	Category	Work	Result	Ref.
2013	Academy Award	Best Supporting Actress	Nebraska	Nominated	
2013	Critics' Choice Movie Awards	Best Supporting Actress	Nebraska	Nominated	
2013	Independent Spirit Award	Best Supporting Female	Nebraska	Nominated	
2013	Golden Globe Awards	Best Supporting Actress – Motion Picture	Nebraska	Nominated	
2013	Actor Awards	Outstanding Performance by a Female Actor in a Supporting Role	Nebraska	Nominated	
2013	AARP Movies for Grownups Awards	Best Supporting Actress	Nebraska	Nominated	
2013	American Comedy Awards	Best Comedy Supporting Actress - Film	Nebraska	Nominated	
2013	Boston Society of Film Critics	Best Supporting Actress	Nebraska	Won	
2013	Chicago Film Critics Association	Best Supporting Actress	Nebraska	Nominated	
2013	Dallas-Fort Worth Film Critics Association	Best Supporting Actress	Nebraska	Nominated	
2013	Denver Film Critics Society	Best Supporting Actress	Nebraska	Nominated	
2013	Detroit Film Critics Society	Best Supporting Actress	Nebraska	Nominated	
2013	Georgia Film Critics Association	Best Supporting Actress	Nebraska	Nominated	
2013	Houston Film Critics Society Awards	Best Supporting Actress	Nebraska	Nominated	
2013	Indiana Film Journalists Association	Best Supporting Actress	Nebraska	Runner-Up	
2013	Los Angeles Film Critics Association	Best Supporting Actress	Nebraska	Nominated	
2013	London Critics Circle Film Awards	Supporting Actress of the Year	Nebraska	Nominated	
2013	New York Film Critics Circle	Best Supporting Actress	Nebraska	3rd Runner-Up	
2013	Phoenix Film Critics Society Award	Best Actress in a Supporting Role	Nebraska	Nominated	
2013	Phoenix Film Critics Society Award	Breakthrough Performance on Camera	Nebraska	Nominated	
2013	San Francisco Film Critics Circle	Best Supporting Actress	Nebraska	Nominated	
2013	Satellite Award	Best Supporting Actress - Motion Picture	Nebraska	Won	
2013	Santa Barbara International Film Festival	Virtuoso Award	Nebraska	Won	
2013	Seattle Film Critics Society	Best Supporting Actress	Nebraska	Nominated	
2013	St. Louis Film Critics Association	Best Supporting Actress	Nebraska	Nominated	
2013	Toronto Film Critics Association	Best Supporting Actress	Nebraska	Nominated	
2013	Vancouver Film Critics Circle	Best Supporting Actress	Nebraska	Nominated	
2013	Washington D.C. Area Film Critics Association	Best Supporting Actress	Nebraska	Nominated	
2014	Online Film & Television Association	Best Guest Actress in a Comedy Series	Girls	Nominated	
2024	San Diego Film Critics Society Awards	Best Comedic Performance	Thelma	Won	
2024	AARP Movies for Grownups Awards	Best Actress	Thelma	Nominated	
2024	Satellite Awards	Best Actress in a Motion Picture – Comedy or Musical	Thelma	Nominated	
2024	Saturn Awards	Best Actress in a Film	Thelma	Nominated	
2024	Independent Spirit Awards	Best Lead Performance	Thelma	Nominated	
2024	Alliance of Women Film Journalists	Best Actress	Thelma	Nominated	
2024	Alliance of Women Film Journalists	Best Women's Breakthrough Performance	Thelma	Nominated	
2024	Alliance of Women Film Journalists	Best Stunt Performance	Thelma	Won	
2026	Children's and Family Emmy Awards	Outstanding Children's Personality	Storyline Online	Nominated	
2026	AARP Movies for Grownups Awards	Best Actress	Eleanor the Great	Nominated	
2026	Drama Desk Award	Outstanding Ensemble	Marjorie Prime	Won	
2026	Tony Award	Best Featured Actress in a Play	Marjorie Prime	Nominated	
2026	Dorian Award	Outstanding Featured Performance in a Broadway Play	Marjorie Prime	Nominated	

== See also ==
- List of oldest and youngest Academy Award winners and nominees
- List of actors with Academy Award nominations
