= Erin Markey =

American writer, comedian, and performance artist

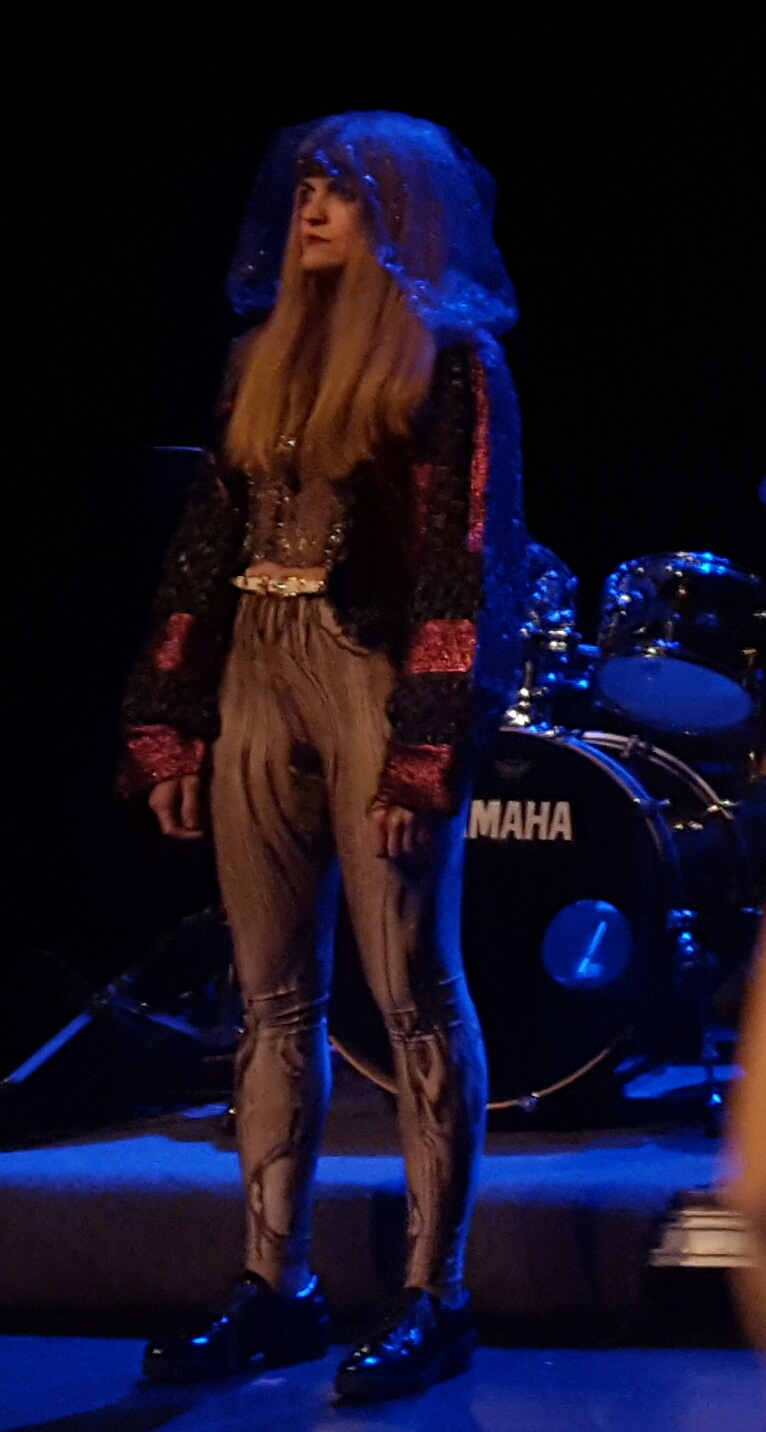
- Erin Markey performing at La Chapelle in 2017
- Born: 1981 (age 44–45); Michigan, USA
- Education: University of Michigan
- Occupations: Writer; comedian; performance artist
- Website: Official website

Erin Markey (born 1981) is an American writer, comedian, and performance artist based in New York City. Markey's work combines elements of cabaret theater and comedy and often incorporates stories of their childhood in the Midwest. The New York Times has described Markey variously as "hilariously sociopathic" and as having "a cult following as an alt-cabaret star with swaggering confidence and off-kilter sense of humor."

== Early life and career beginnings ==
Markey was born in Michigan in 1981. They were raised Catholic. Their father was a marketer in telecommunications and their mother was a medical assistant. In high school, Markey flirted with being a "Bible Belt Christian," due to the influence of friends and their sense that " it felt like really impassioned, relatively speaking, to Catholicism." In high school, Markey informed their parents that they wanted to become a performer, rather than a veterinarian, which made their mother "really mad."

Markey studied performance at the University of Michigan, taking a class taught by well-known performance artist Holly Hughes. After college, Markey worked for five months at a strip club, an experience that, according to a profile in The New York Times, was "helpful in developing her [sic] confidence and stage presence." Markey drew upon this experience in several performance works.

Markey has described, in an interview published in Bomb, their self-imposed separation from their family after they came out as gay, a period they described as a "wonderful break of me being able to just develop artistically outside the bounds of me feeling as accountable to them." In the same interview, Markey described their misgivings and anxieties about their family seeing their work, which draws upon their family life. Markey explained: "It's not exactly dirty laundry, but just things that feel private are like, being made into a show where tons of people are watching it."

== Career ==
Markey has stated that they consider alt-cabaret performer Bridget Everett a "possible career model" for her. Describing their troubles writing an accurate description of their career, Markey said that the "most truthful" description of what they do is "Erin Markey makes stuff for stage and video that has music in it."

In 2010, Markey's musical show Puppy Love: A Stripper's Tail was produced at Performance Space 122 in New York City. Based on Markey's experiences working as a stripper after college, Puppy Love was praised as "a must-see tale/tail for all you ladies and gents (but mostly ladies) who work in the gray area between theater and erotic arts in New York. It's also worth seeing if you don't work in that lovely, glistening niche of the alternative entertainment world." Michelle Tea wrote favorably of Puppy Love, calling it "innovative" due to its unusual treatment on the topic and also praised Markey's voice.

In 2013, Markey starred in Progressive Theatre Workshop's God Hates This Show: Shirley Phelps-Roper in Concert, Live From Hell, a musical written and directed by John J. Caswell, Jr. that satirized Westboro Baptist Church. Markey played Shirley Phelps-Roper, daughter of Fred Phelps, the founder of Westboro Baptist Church. In the play, Phelps-Roper has died and gone to hell and sings songs expressing the hateful beliefs of the church. As one account described their performance, "[b]acked by a full rock band, Markey as Phelps-Roper sings such 'hits' as 'Death in Your Window,' a parody of Melissa Etheridge's 'Come to My Window,' and 'Stinky Freak,' known in non-heelish circles as 'Super Freak.' She's [sic] accompanied by a trio of backup singers and dancers in full-on cabaret mode."

From 2013 to 2014, Markey's show Erin Markey ran at Joe's Pub. Jarrett Earnest, writing about the show, observed that "Markey plays 'Erin Markey' as an outsized persona through autobiographical sketches interlaced with musical numbers—a tried and true nightclub strategy. The songs, usually contemporary pop songs, are performed with an intensity that unravels them." Asked about their work in Erin Markey, Markey explained, "It's funny to be making this show right now where I'm supposed to be Erin Markey the whole time because I feel like I work best when I'm in character. That's when I'm most honest. .... I had trouble writing a bio recently because I was like, 'I don't want to be called a performance artist. I don't wanna be called a comedian, I don't want to be called an actor, or a singer or a cabaret artist,' because none of those things seem to really describe who I am.

In 2015, Markey's play Deleted Scenes from Fun Home, based on the Broadway adaptation Alison Bechdel's graphic novel Fun Home, was produced at the Duplex Cabaret Theatre in New York City. A one-person show written by and starring Markey, the show purported to present deleted scenes from the Broadway musical Fun Home. Asked about the inspiration for Deleted Scenes from Fun Home, Markey described how they became obsessed with the score to the Broadway musical Fun Home, saying that "for largely unnameable or unknowable reasons, I was activated in a strange way that I had no control over."

On January 13, 2016, Markey's show A Ride on the Irish Cream, which was funded in part by an Indiegogo campaign, premiered at the Abrons Arts Center of the Henry Street Settlement. The show has been described as "a musical anchored inside the memory of a Michigan backyard on the bank of the Kawkawlin River. A live band and original score become the space for the thrills and terrors of a relationship between Reagan (Markey), a vainglorious self-made girl, and Irish Cream (Becca Blackwell), her family's pontoon boat/horse. They are in love, but when their relationship is tested by dust ruffles, sex for money, severe T-storms, and a secret cellar, the only way to stay together is to remember all the parts of themselves their bodies tried to forget."

In 2019, Markey appeared in the third season of the HBO series High Maintenance, playing the character Cori. The Atlantic described their performance as a "lived-in depiction of blue-collar crunchiness."

== Personal life ==
For several years, Markey was in a long-term relationship with performance artist Becca Blackwell, with whom Markey has had numerous artistic collaborations. In November 2022, Markey married film producer Gwen Bialic, who worked as a Unit Production Manager on High Maintenance.
