= The Day Shall Come =

Film directed by Chris Morris

- Theatrical release poster
- Directed by: Chris Morris
- Written by: Chris Morris; Jesse Armstrong
- Produced by: Iain Canning; Anne Carey; Emile Sherman
- Starring: Marchánt Davis; Anna Kendrick; Danielle Brooks; Kayvan Novak; Denis O'Hare; Jim Gaffigan
- Cinematography: Marcel Zyskind
- Edited by: Billy Sneddon
- Music by: Chris Morris; Sebastian Rochford; Jonathan Whitehead
- Production companies: See-Saw Films; Film4 Productions; Archer Gray; BFI Film Fund; FilmNation Entertainment
- Distributed by: Entertainment One (United Kingdom); IFC Films (United States); Transmission Films (Australia)
- Release dates: 11 March 2019 (SXSW); 27 September 2019 (United States); 11 October 2019 (United Kingdom)
- Running time: 88 minutes
- Countries: United Kingdom; United States; Australia
- Language: English
- Box office: $543,993

The Day Shall Come is a 2019 dark comedy film directed by Chris Morris, who co-wrote the screenplay with Jesse Armstrong and co-scored the film with Sebastian Rochford and Jonathan Whitehead. It stars Marchánt Davis, Anna Kendrick, Danielle Brooks, and Denis O'Hare. The film satirises a number of real-life FBI sting operations including the Liberty City Seven.

A co-production between the United Kingdom, the United States, and Australia, the film was secretly shot in the Dominican Republic from 2017 to 2018 and had its world premiere at South by Southwest on 11 March 2019. It was released in the United States by IFC Films on 27 September 2019 and in the United Kingdom by Entertainment One on 11 October 2019.

== Plot ==
Moses Al Shabazz is the impoverished leader of a small religious commune, the Star of Six, in Miami. The commune has three other members: Moses's wife Venus, and followers X and Afrika. It worships deities including Allah, "Black Santa", and General Toussaint Louverture. Moses preaches a black uprising against the white oppressors, but opposes the use of firearms. He has been prescribed anti-psychotic medication, but does not take it, as it makes him drowsy.

Agent Kendra Glack of the FBI comes across one of Moses's live-streamed sermons, and decides that he will make an ideal dupe on whom to pin revolutionary activities. When Moses is served an eviction notice by his landlord, Kendra sends Reza, a pedophilic shopkeeper now working undercover for the FBI, to claim that his relative, a sheikh affiliated with Al-Qaeda, would be willing to supply money and firearms to Moses. Reza sets up a meeting between Moses and the supposed sheikh (in fact another FBI informant, Nura), but Moses initially asks only for farm equipment and a horse. However, having appreciated how much money the guns represent, he subsequently agrees to accept 50 Kalashnikov rifles.

Venus is horrified at these dealings, and leaves the commune with their daughter, even though Moses has promised not to use the guns. Moses witnesses a lightning strike destroy a crane, which he interprets as a sign from God. On the day of the exchange, the FBI prepare to arrest him for the illegal gun deal, but he rides to the FBI headquarters on his horse and attempts to turn in the dealers for a reward. He meets with Kendra before leaving: she shows sympathy for his situation, but says she can't help him. When Moses returns to his commune, he finds his followers have been evicted. His landlord agrees to let him return in exchange for procuring uranium from the sheikh; and the FBI sees this as an opportunity to have him arrested for attempting to use a nuclear device.

Moses makes a deal to sell the uranium to a group of neo-Nazis for $100,000, but instead of procuring the real uranium has his followers fill the canisters with urine and beans. The neo-Nazis are actually undercover police officers, and in having Moses contact them, the FBI cross over into police territory, leading the Miami police to take over the case and attempt to arrest Moses, X, Afrika, and Moses's landlord at the uranium sale. Kendra is able to persuade the police to stand down and let Moses, X, and Afrika go, while arresting the landlord. Moses believes he is now off the hook; but as he drives his bus back into town to meet his wife and daughter at a donut shop, the police give chase.

The Miami police have called a nuclear emergency, forcing Kendra to do likewise in order to retain control of the situation. On their way to the donut shop, Kendra's superior Andy hints that it would all be easier if Moses were shot, prompting Kendra to rethink her position. At the shop, a policeman's gun goes off by mistake, sending everyone running for cover. Reza, who is also present, tries to give Moses a fake rocket launcher in order to give the FBI an excuse to arrest him, but Moses pretends to be an undercover cop and arrests Reza, who Afrika accidentally shoots in the head with a toy crossbow. Kendra enters the shop and asks Moses to stand down, but he attempts to fire the rocket launcher at her and her accompanying officers, allowing the FBI to arrest him and his followers. As he is being led away, Kendra promises Moses that his daughter will be cared for.

The end credits state that all FBI personnel involved in the case were promoted, while Moses and his followers were given 20 to 35 years in prison on plea bargains with no trial. Venus was given 15 years for aiding a terrorist organization.

== Cast ==
- Marchánt Davis as Moses Al Shabaz, an impoverished preacher
- Anna Kendrick as Kendra Glack, an FBI operative
- Danielle Brooks as Venus Al Shabaz, Moses's wife
- Denis O'Hare as Andy Mudd, Glack's boss
- Jim Gaffigan as Lemmy, a neo-Nazi
- Miles Robbins as Josh
- Pej Vahdat as Nura
- Adam David Thompson as Stevie
- Kayvan Novak as Reza the Shopkeeper, a pedophile working for Glack
- Mousa Kraish as Malik
- James Adomian as Settmonk, a police officer
- Malcolm Mays as X
- Calah Lane as Rosa

== Production ==
The film was secretly shot in the Dominican Republic from 2017 to 2018.

== Release ==
The film had its world premiere at South by Southwest on 11 March 2019. It was released in the United States on 27 September 2019. and in the United Kingdom on 11 October 2019.

== Reception ==
On Rotten Tomatoes, the film has an approval rating of 64% based on 92 reviews, with an average rating of 6.4/10. The website's critical consensus reads: "Absurd yet anchored in knotty real-world themes, The Day Shall Come adds another bleakly funny satire to director/co-writer Christopher Morris' filmography." On Metacritic, the film has a weighted average score of 70% based on reviews from 21 critics, indicating "generally favorable reviews".

John DeFore of The Hollywood Reporter wrote: "The film represents another leap forward for [Morris], who has had a long career in the U.K. but whose work may always remain too biting to find broad success Stateside." Of Marchánt's performance, Terry Staunton of Radio Times says "Davis impresses as both a comic presence and as a man struggling with more personal demons in a movie that provokes thought as much as it pokes fun."
