= Family Squares =

- Theatrical release poster
- Directed by: Stephanie Laing
- Written by: Stephanie Laing; Brad Morris
- Produced by: Jonathan Tropper; Peter Odiorne; Alex Saks; Stephanie Laing
- Starring: Zoë Chao; Ann Dowd; Elsie Fisher; Judy Greer; Scott MacArthur; Billy Magnussen; Sam Richardson; Timothy Simons; June Squibb; Casey Wilson; Henry Winkler
- Cinematography: Kevin Atkinson
- Edited by: Joe Klotz
- Music by: Joseph Stephens
- Production companies: Cake or Death Pictures; Page Fifty-Four Pictures
- Distributed by: Screen Media
- Release date: February 25, 2022
- Running time: 95 minutes
- Country: United States
- Language: English

Family Squares is a 2022 American comedy-drama film directed by Stephanie Laing, written by Laing and Brad Morris, and starring Zoë Chao, Ann Dowd, Elsie Fisher, Judy Greer, Scott MacArthur, Billy Magnussen, Sam Richardson, Timothy Simons, June Squibb, Casey Wilson and Henry Winkler.

== Plot ==
A family that's been divided for years has to come together when the matriarch grandma Mabel dies suddenly. Her death takes the family on a journey, discovering that not only did she keep secrets, but so did everyone else.

== Cast ==
- Henry Winkler as Bobby
- June Squibb as Mabel
- Margo Martindale as Diane
- Ann Dowd as Judith
- Billy Magnussen as Robert
- Elsie Fisher as Cassie
- Judy Greer as Dorsey
- Casey Wilson as Katie
- Zoë Chao as Kelly
- Sam Richardson as Alex
- Scott MacArthur as Chad
- Timothy Simons as Bret
- Rob Reiner as Narrator

== Release ==
The film was released in theaters and on-demand on February 25, 2022, by Screen Media.

== Reception ==
The film has a 75% rating on Rotten Tomatoes based on 20 reviews. Ferdosa of Screen Rant awarded the film two and a half stars out of five. Tara McNamara of Common Sense Media awarded the film three stars out of five.

William Bibbiani of TheWrap gave the film a negative review and wrote, "It’s a shame that so much of Family Squares tries so hard to be goofy(...)When the film allows itself to be intimate, lovely moments occur."

Concepción de León of The New York Times gave the film a positive review, calling it, "a lighthearted and touching look at the feuds, resentments and secrets that can surface when someone dies."
