= Marchánt Davis =

American actor

Marchánt Davis (/mɑːrˈʃɑːnt/) is an American actor. He is known for his performance in the 2019 film The Day Shall Come. He also played a supporting role in the film Tuscaloosa (2019). He also acted in the Peabody Award-winning film Reality (2023). He was nominated for a Lucille Lortel Award for his performance in Jordan E. Cooper's Ain't No Mo' at The Public Theater.

== Early life and education ==
Davis was born in Philadelphia. He attended Philadelphia High School for Creative and Performing Arts. He holds a Master of Fine Arts degree from New York University's Tisch School of the Arts.

== Personal life ==
Davis resides in New York City.

== Filmography ==
- The Day Shall Come (2019)
- Tuscaloosa (2019)
- A Journal for Jordan (2021)
- Reality (2023)
- Love Language (2026)

== Stage credits ==
Year	Title	Role	Venue	Ref.
2011	You're a Good Man, Charlie Brown	Linus	Regional, The Barnstormers Theatre	
2011	Big River	Ensemble	Regional, The Lyric Stage Company of Boston	
2019	Ain't No Mo	Passenger 2	Off-Broadway, The Public Theater	
2019	The Great Society	Stokely Carmichael	Broadway, Vivian Beaumont Theatre	
2022	Ain't No Mo	Passenger 2	Broadway, Belasco Theatre	
2023	Good Night, Oscar	Alvin Finney	Broadway, Belasco Theatre	
2025	The Antiquities	Man 2	Off-Broadway, Playwrights Horizons	
2025	Wine in the Wilderness	Associate Director	Off-Broadway, Classic Stage Company	
2025	The Antiquities	Man 2	Chicago, Goodman Theatre	
2025	Other	Associate Director	Off-Broadway, Greenwich House Theater	
2026	The Saviors	Associate Director	Off-Broadway, Atlantic Theatre Company	
