= Marjorie Prime (play) =

2014 stage play by Jordan Harrison

- Original language: English
- Written by: Jordan Harrison
- Characters: Marjorie; Tess; Walter; Jon
- Genre: Drama

Premiere
- Date: September 10, 2014
- Place: Mark Taper Forum

Marjorie Prime is a dramatic science-fiction stage play written by American playwright Jordan Harrison. The play premiered in 2014 at the Mark Taper Forum in Los Angeles produced by Center Theatre Group, and then transferred to Off-Broadway at Playwrights Horizons in 2015. The play was nominated for the Pulitzer Prize for Drama in 2015 and made its Broadway debut in 2025 as part of Second Stage's theatrical season at the Helen Hayes Theatre, starring June Squibb.

== Plot ==
An elderly widow at the end of her life embraces technology to potentially preserve her memory. The plays deals with the topic of digital footprints and their effect on future generations as technology continues to advance.

== Background ==
Harrison has said the play had two main inspirations: his grandmother, who suffered from memory loss, and Brian Christian's book The Most Human Human, which explores the Turing test and what distinguishes humans from machines. Marjorie Prime is considered the third play in an unofficial trilogy on humanity and technology, after Futura and Maple and Vine.

== Production history ==
The play is available for licensing through Concord Theatricals. The play was first workshopped at the Pacific Playwrights Festival in 2013, directed by Pam MacKinnon. The original production at the Mark Taper Forum was directed by Les Waters, while Anne Kauffman directed the Off-Broadway production and will direct the Broadway production in 2025. The Chicago premiere production in 2015 was produced by Writers Theatre and directed by Kimberly Senior. In 2023, Menier Chocolate Factory staged a production starring Anne Reid and directed by Dominic Dromgoole. The Broadway premiere opened in 2025 as part of Second Stage's theatrical season at the Helen Hayes Theatre, starring June Squibb.

== Original casts and characters ==
Character	Los Angeles (2014)	Off-Broadway (2015)	Chicago (2015)	Film (2017)	London (2023)	Broadway (2025)
Marjorie	Lois Smith	Lois Smith	Mary Ann Thebus	Lois Smith	Anne Reid	June Squibb
Tess, Marjorie's daughter	Lisa Emery	Lisa Emery	Kate Fry	Geena Davis	Nancy Carroll	Cynthia Nixon
Jon, Marjorie's son-in-law	Frank Wood	Stephen Root	Nathan Hosner	Tim Robbins	Tony Jayawardena	Danny Burstein
Walter Prime, a super-computer	Jeff Ward	Noah Bean	Erik Hellman	Jon Hamm	Richard Fleeshman	Christopher Lowell

== Awards and nominations ==
=== 2015 Off-Broadway production ===
Year	Award	Category	Work	Result	Ref.
2015	Pulitzer Prize for Drama			Nominated	
2016	Drama League Award	Outstanding Production of a Play		Nominated	
2016	Drama League Award	Distinguished Performance	Lois Smith	Nominated	
2016	Lucille Lortel Award	Outstanding Director	Anne Kauffman	Nominated	

=== 2025 Broadway revival ===
Year	Award	Category	Work	Result	Ref.
2026	Tony Award	Best Featured Actor in a Play	Danny Burstein	Nominated	
2026	Tony Award	Best Featured Actress in a Play	June Squibb	Nominated	
2026	Drama Desk Award	Ensemble Award	June Squibb, Cynthia Nixon, Danny Burstein and Christopher Lowell	Won	
2026	Outer Critics Circle Award	Outstanding Revival of a Play		Nominated	
2026	Outer Critics Circle Award	Outstanding Featured Performer in a Broadway Play	Danny Burstein	Nominated	

== Film adaptation ==
The play was adapted into a feature film in 2017, written and directed by Michael Almereyda. The film premiered at the 2017 Sundance Film Festival and was distributed by FilmRise. The film expanded the world of the play, with Lois Smith reprising the titular role, and Jon Hamm, Geena Davis and Tim Robbins in the principal roles.
