= Michael Almereyda =

American film director and screenwriter

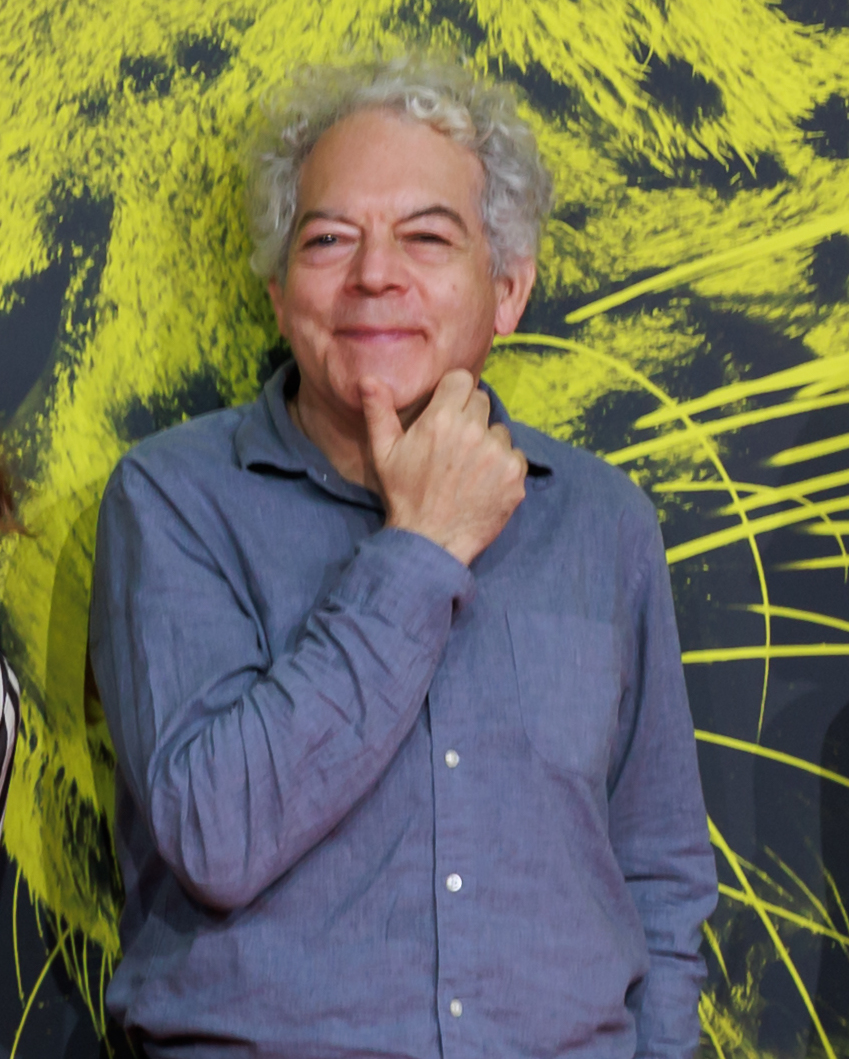
- Born: April 7, 1959 (age 67); Overland Park, Kansas, U.S.
- Occupations: Film director; screenwriter; producer
- Years active: 1985–present
- Awards: Moving Image Creative Capital Award (2015); Alfred P. Sloan Prize (2017)

Michael Almereyda (born April 7, 1959) is an American film director, screenwriter, and film producer. He studied art history at Harvard University but dropped out after three years to pursue filmmaking. He acquired a Hollywood agent on the strength of a spec script about Nikola Tesla. His films include Hamlet (2000) and Experimenter (2015). His film William Eggleston in the Real World (2005) was nominated for a Gotham Award for Best Documentary from the Independent Filmmaker Project.

In 2015 Almereyda received the Moving Image Creative Capital Award. His film Marjorie Prime (2017), a philosophical science-fiction film based on Jordan Harrison's play of the same name, was screened at Sundance Film Festival and won the Sloan Feature Film Prize.

== Personal life ==
Almereyda was born in Kansas, and, when he was a child, his family moved to Orange County, California, where he befriended the film critic Manny Farber, who became an important influence on his life. He now lives in New York City. His younger sister is the actress, comedian, and writer Spencer Kayden, and he also has two other brothers.

== Partial filmography ==
- A Hero of Our Time (1985)
- Twister (1989)
- Total Recall (1990) - co-writer, uncredited
- Until the End of the World (1991) - co-writer, uncredited
- Another Girl Another Planet (1992)
- Nadja (1994)
- At Sundance (1995)
- The Rocking Horse Winner (1997)
- The Eternal (1998)
- Hamlet (2000)
- Happy Here and Now (2002)
- This So-Called Disaster (2004)
- William Eggleston in the Real World (2005)
- New Orleans, Mon Amour (2008)
- Big River Blues (2008)
- Tonight at Noon (2009)
- Paradise (2009)
- The Great Gatsby in Five Minutes (2011)
- The Ogre's Feathers (2012)
- Skinningrove (2013)
- Cymbeline (2014)
- Experimenter (2015)
- Marjorie Prime (2017)
- Escapes (2017)
- The Lonedale Operator (2018)
- Tesla (2020)
- John Lilly and the Earth Coincidence Control Office (2025)

== Recognition and awards ==
- 2025 – Almereyda was appointed as a member of the jury at the 78th Locarno Film Festival for Pardo Verde Competition.
- 2017 – Alfred P. Sloan Prize – Marjorie Prime at 2017 Sundance Film Festival.
