= Bobbi Althoff =

American podcaster and TikToker (born 1997)

- Born: Bobbi Heck; July 31, 1997 (age 29); Moreno Valley, California, U.S.
- Occupations: Podcaster; influencer
- Years active: 2021–present
- Spouse: Cory Althoff (m. 2020; div. 2024)
- Children: 2

Bobbi Althoff (née Heck; born July 31, 1997) is an American podcaster and influencer known for her viral interviews with Drake, Lil Yachty, Offset, and other celebrities.

== Early life ==
Bobbi Heck was born July 31, 1997, in Moreno Valley and grew up in Perris, California. She is the second youngest of six children. After graduating from high school, she sought work as a nanny.

== Career ==
Althoff started posting content on TikTok in 2021 with a focus on sharing her pregnancy updates. Her first TikTok, which was of her dancing with a banana, reached nearly 2 million views.

In 2023, she created a new TikTok account on which she posts comedic videos. That February, Althoff announced she had filmed a pilot for her upcoming podcast. The podcast, named The Really Good Podcast, debuted in April 2023.

In July 2023, Althoff interviewed rapper Drake on an episode of The Really Good Podcast. Clips from the interview went viral on TikTok. The full interview was later removed from Althoff's YouTube channel in August, which sparked rumors of a feud.

Other celebrities Althoff has interviewed on her podcast include Lil Yachty, Mark Cuban, Offset, Shaquille O'Neal, Rick Glassman, Bobby Lee, and Sukihana.

During her February 2024 interview with Sukihana, the interviewee appeared to confuse the words "musician" and "magician", becoming annoyed with Althoff for referring to her as the former. A snippet of the interview that included this apparent misunderstanding went viral.

"So I'm a musician. What the fuck that mean? Make magic or something. What is musician?... ...I'm not no musician. I make music. I make music. And that's not all I do: I make music, I act; I'm a TV star too; A young mogul... ...I'm not confusing nothing because you don't know. You thought that all I was a magician or whatever the fuck you said.... ...No. I think. I don't think baby; I don't think. What is that? That's ghetto? I don't think. I know. Think."

— Destiny Lanette Henderson aka "Sukihana", 2024

In February 2024, deepfake pornography of Althoff trended on X, which raised concerns about the site's prominent role in the propagation of AI porn.

In August 2024, Althoff announced she would be hosting a live comedy show at the Wiltern in Los Angeles together with Sukihana. In July 2025, Althoff announced the end of The Really Good Podcast. In August 2025, Althoff announced a new podcast with Drake titled Not This Again.

In April 2026, it was announced that Althoff would join the cast of The Secret Lives of Mormon Wives: Orange County.

Because of Althoff's sudden rise to fame and interviews with high-profile celebrities, she has often been described as an industry plant.

=== Interview style ===
Alex Abad-Santos of Vox described Althoff's style as "unfazed, dry, bored in an ironic way". He wrote, "She asks her interview subjects what they wear, how they live, and what they like to eat, but doesn't seem that interested in what they have to say. She meets most of them with deadpan sarcasm and silence, making her guests live in the discomfort of whatever they just revealed."

Althoff's podcast has been compared to Between Two Ferns with Zach Galifianakis and Chicken Shop Date, which also put their guests in awkward positions.

== Personal life ==
Bobbi Heck married Cory Althoff, a programmer who works as a senior vice president at CompTIA, in January 2020. She met Cory on Bumble. They have two daughters. Althoff preferred to keep their identities private. In February 2024, Cory filed for divorce with a date of separation listed as July 4, 2023, citing irreconcilable differences. Their divorce was finalized in August 2024.

Althoff said in August 2023 that she struggles with depression.
