= The Jilting of Granny Weatherall =

Short story by Katherine Anne Porter

"The Jilting of Granny Weatherall" is a short story written by the American writer Katherine Anne Porter. It was published in 1930 as part of Porter's short story collection Flowering Judas, and Other Stories. It is a stream-of-consciousness narrative detailing the thoughts of a woman attempting to tie up loose ends as she lies on her deathbed.

== Plot ==
Octogenarian Granny Weatherall lies in bed, attended to by Dr. Harry and her grown daughter Cornelia. As she "rummages around her mind," she senses death lurking nearby, and she desires to stave it off until she can destroy a bundle of old letters from a former lover who jilted Granny Weatherall sixty years ago.

Granny reflects on the old days when her children were still young and there was still work to be done. She imagines being reunited with her husband John. She imagines finding her dead child, Hapsy, standing with a baby on her arm. Hapsy comes in close to say, "I thought you’d never come." Granny's thoughts wander back to her former lover George. She decides she would like to see him again and show him she was able to move on with her life.

Father Connolly arrives to administer the last rites, but Granny feels she made her peace with God long ago and does not need the priest. Granny asks God for a sign of assurance that she is loved and accepted, but there is no sign. Feeling as if God has rejected her just as George once did, Granny feels immense grief as she dies.
