= Drama League Award for Outstanding Production of a Play =

Annual American theater award

Drama Desk Award for Outstanding Production of a Play
- Awarded for: Best Play
- Location: New York City
- Presented by: The Drama League
- Currently held by: Stereophonic by David Adjmi (2024)
- Website: Drama League.com

The Drama League Award for Outstanding Production of a Play, is a theater award presented annually since 1996 by The Drama League recognizes a "full production" of a play during a theater season.

== Winners ==
=== 1990s ===
Year	Production	Playwright	Ref.
1996	Seven Guitars	August Wilson	
1997	The Last Night of Ballyhoo	Alfred Uhry	
1998	The Beauty Queen of Leenane	Martin McDonagh	
1999	Wit	Margaret Edson	

=== 2000s ===
Year	Production	Playwright	Ref.
2000	Copenhagen	Michael Frayn	
2001	Proof	David Auburn	
2002	Metamorphoses	Mary Zimmerman	
2003	Take Me Out	Richard Greenberg	
2004	I Am My Own Wife	Doug Wright	
2005	Doubt	John Patrick Shanley	
2006	The History Boys	Alan Bennett	
2007	The Coast of Utopia	Tom Stoppard	
2008	August: Osage County	Tracy Letts	
2009	God of Carnage	Yasmina Reza	

=== 2010s ===
Year	Production	Playwright	Ref.
2010	Red	John Logan	
2011	War Horse	Michael Morpurgo	
2012	Other Desert Cities	Jon Robin Baitz	
2013	Vanya and Sonia and Masha and Spike	Christopher Durang	
2014	All the Way	Robert Schenkkan	
2015	The Curious Incident of the Dog in the Nighttime	Simon Stephens	
2016	The Humans	Stephen Karam	
2017	Oslo	J.T. Rogers	
2018	Harry Potter and the Cursed Child	Jack Thorne	
2019	The Ferryman	Jez Butterworth	

=== 2020s ===
Year	Production	Playwright	Ref.
2020	The Inheritance	Matthew López	
2021	No Award Given due to the COVID-19 pandemic		
2022	The Lehman Trilogy	Stefano Massini	
2023	Leopoldstadt	Tom Stoppard	
2024	Stereophonic	David Adjmi	
2025	Oh, Mary!	Cole Escola	
