= Becca Blackwell =

American actor, performer

Becca Blackwell (born 1973/1974) is an American trans actor, performer, and playwright based in New York City. Their (Note: Blackwell uses they/them pronouns.) play They, Themself and Schmerm has been presented by a number of venues, including at The Public Theater's 2018 Under the Radar Festival, the Abrons Arts Center, and the Portland Institute for Contemporary Art's TBA Festival.

Musician Kathleen Hanna, writing for Artforum, listed Blackwell among their favourite performers of 2014. Blackwell was a recipient of a 2015 Doris Duke Impact Award. In 2016, they were interviewed by Jim Fletcher for BOMB. Blackwell was part of the 2019 class of the Joe's Pub Working Group, a program dedicated to supporting artists at a critical point in their careers.

Blackwell appeared in the second season of the television series The Pitt as social worker Dylan Easton.

== Work ==
Work	Role	Location	Year	Reference
Untitled Feminist Show		Jerome Robbins Theatre	2012	
Seagull: Thinking of You	Trigorin/Peter/Dorn	New Ohio Theatre	2013	
Samara	The Manan	A.R.T./New York Theaters	2017	
Is This a Room	Unknown Male	The Kitchen	2019	
Hurricane Diane	Diane	New York Theatre Workshop	2019	

== Television ==
Year	Title	Role	Notes
2026	The Pitt	Dylan Easton	3 episodes
2026	Survivial of the Thickest	Day	5 episodes
2023	Sort Of	Deenzie	12 episodes
2013	High Maintenance	A.J.	S4 Ep8

== Accolades ==
Year	Award	Category	Nominee(s)	Result	Ref.
2022	Peabody Awards	Entertainment	Sort Of	Nominated	
