= Daniel Mallory =

Daniel Mallory is the name of:

- Dan Mallory, an American author who writes under the pseudonym A.J. Finn
- Daniel M. Lavery, American humorist, fiction writer and advice columnist
- D. Mallory Stephens, American politician
