= Killer Joe =

Killer Joe may refer to:

== Music ==
- "Killer Joe", a 1960 jazz standard composed by Benny Golson
- Killer Joe (Benny Golson album), 1977
- Killer Joe (George Kawaguchi & Art Blakey album), 1981
- Killer Joe (Jimmy Osmond album) or the title song, 1972
- Killer Joe, a band formed by Australian jazz vocalist Joe Lane
- "Killer Joe", a 1963 song by the Rocky Fellers

== Other uses ==
- Killer Joe (play), a 1993 play by Tracy Letts
- Killer Joe (film), a 2011 adaptation of the play, directed by William Friedkin
- Killer Joe Piro (1921–1989), American dance instructor
