= The Woman in the Window (2021 film) =

Film by Joe Wright

- Release poster
- Directed by: Joe Wright
- Screenplay by: Tracy Letts
- Based on: The Woman in the Window by A. J. Finn
- Produced by: Scott Rudin; Eli Bush; Anthony Katagas
- Starring: Amy Adams; Gary Oldman; Anthony Mackie; Fred Hechinger; Wyatt Russell; Brian Tyree Henry; Jennifer Jason Leigh; Julianne Moore
- Cinematography: Bruno Delbonnel
- Edited by: Valerio Bonelli
- Music by: Danny Elfman
- Production companies: 20th Century Studios; Fox 2000 Pictures
- Distributed by: Netflix
- Release date: May 14, 2021
- Running time: 100 minutes
- Country: United States
- Language: English
- Budget: $40 million

The Woman in the Window is a 2021 American psychological thriller film directed by Joe Wright and written by Tracy Letts, based on the 2018 novel by A. J. Finn. The film follows an agoraphobic woman (Amy Adams) who begins to spy on her new neighbors (Gary Oldman, Fred Hechinger, and Julianne Moore) and is witness to a crime in their apartment. Anthony Mackie, Wyatt Russell, Brian Tyree Henry, and Jennifer Jason Leigh also star.

The film was produced by Fox 2000 Pictures and was the final film to be produced by the company; it was originally scheduled to be theatrically released by 20th Century Fox in October 2019, but was delayed to May 2020 and subsequently sold to Netflix due to the COVID-19 pandemic. It was released on May 14, 2021, and ranked among the best performing Netflix titles of 2021. Critical reception was mixed and the source novel were among the inspirations for the 2022 Netflix dark comedy series The Woman in the House Across the Street from the Girl in the Window, which spoofed tropes from the psychological thriller genre.

== Plot ==
Child psychologist Anna Fox lives alone in a Manhattan brownstone after separating from her husband Edward. He lives away with their daughter Olivia, but Anna talks to them on a daily basis. Anna has agoraphobia and entertains herself by watching her neighbors, including the Russells, who recently moved in across the street. She also takes a large number of medications and drinks heavily.

One afternoon, Ethan Russell, the teenage son of Alistair Russell, Anna's neighbor, visits Anna and suggests his father is abusive. His mother Jane visits as well and they befriend one another. One night, Anna witnesses Jane being stabbed to death in the living room. She contacts the police, but they do not believe her, claiming everyone in the family is fine. Alistair arrives along with Jane who, to Anna's shock, is not the one who visited her. She begins spying on the Russells.

Anna's tenant David, who lives in her basement, claims he did not hear or see anything. Anna learns David was once in prison and violated his parole conditions. She receives an anonymous e-mail with a photo of her sleeping. She again contacts the detectives, who visit her, joined by the Russells and David. Anna breaks down when a detective confronted her with the truth that Edward and Olivia died from a car crash that she caused. Her agoraphobia is a result of the accident, her medication has caused her to have hallucinations and conversations with people who are not there. Anna apologizes to the Russells and stops spying on them.

Anna records a video on her cell phone, planning to take her own life by overdose. She then discovers a photograph she took of her cat and, in the reflection of a wine glass, sees the original Jane. Anna shows David the photo and he confesses the first "Jane" she met is Katie Melli, Ethan's biological mother. Katie had been stalking the Russells, trying to get close to Ethan. David refuses to help Anna prove the truth; he is then suddenly attacked and killed by Ethan, who had been lurking inside the house.

Ethan reveals to Anna that he murdered Katie and is a serial killer, having also killed Alistair's executive assistant in Boston, and now intending to kill Anna. He accessed her house with a stolen key, and was the one who took the photo of her sleeping. Anna flees to the roof, where they fight until she pushes Ethan through the skylight to his death.

As Anna recovers in the hospital, Detective Little visits and tells her they have arrested Alistair and Jane for helping Ethan cover up Katie's murder and that they have found Katie's body. Little admits he watched Anna's suicide video, but hands back her phone to allow her to delete it before she has to return it for evidence. He apologizes for not believing her.

Nine months later, Anna, now sober and healthy, says goodbye to her house before she moves out and on with her life, no longer afraid of the outside world.

== Cast ==
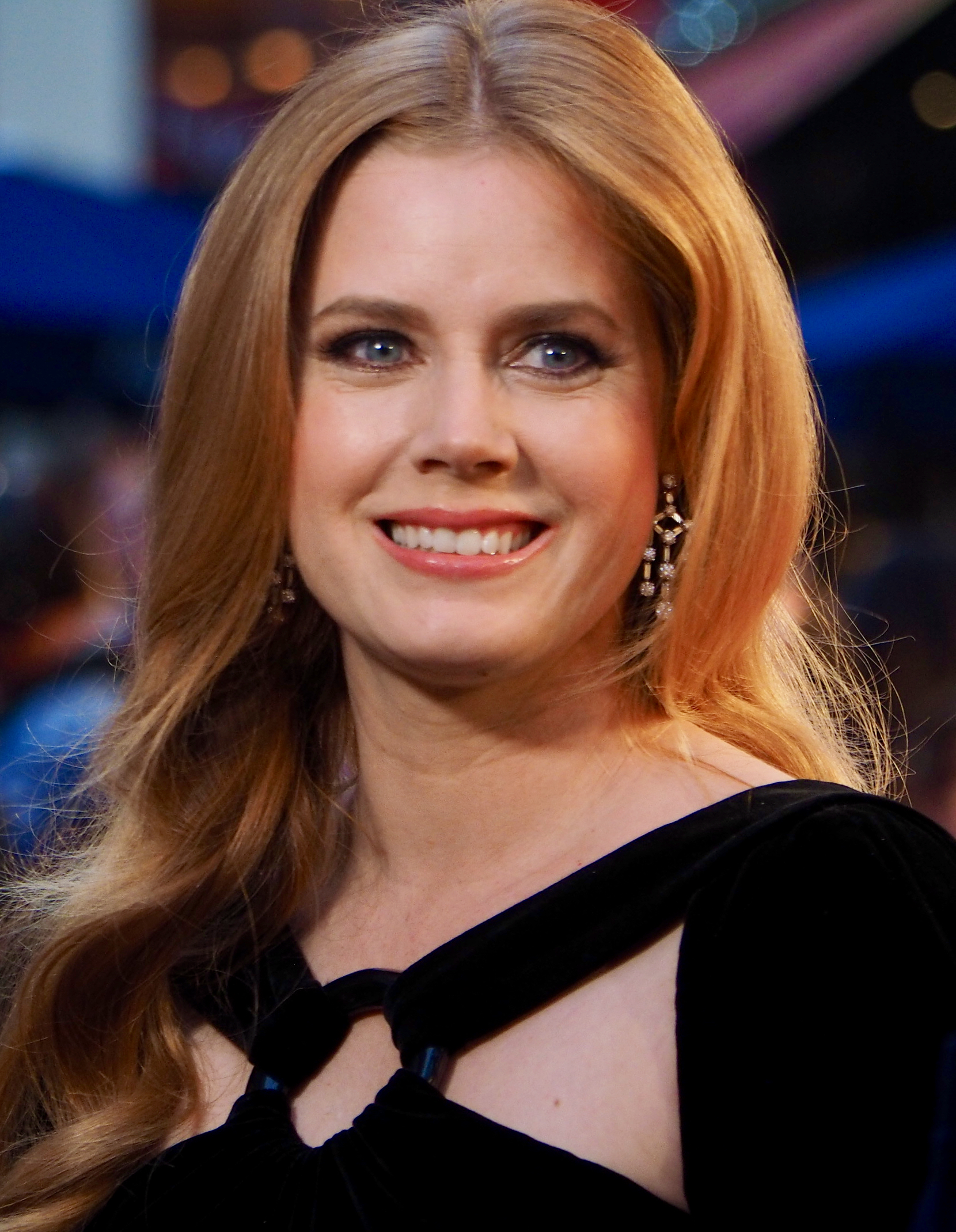
Amy Adams

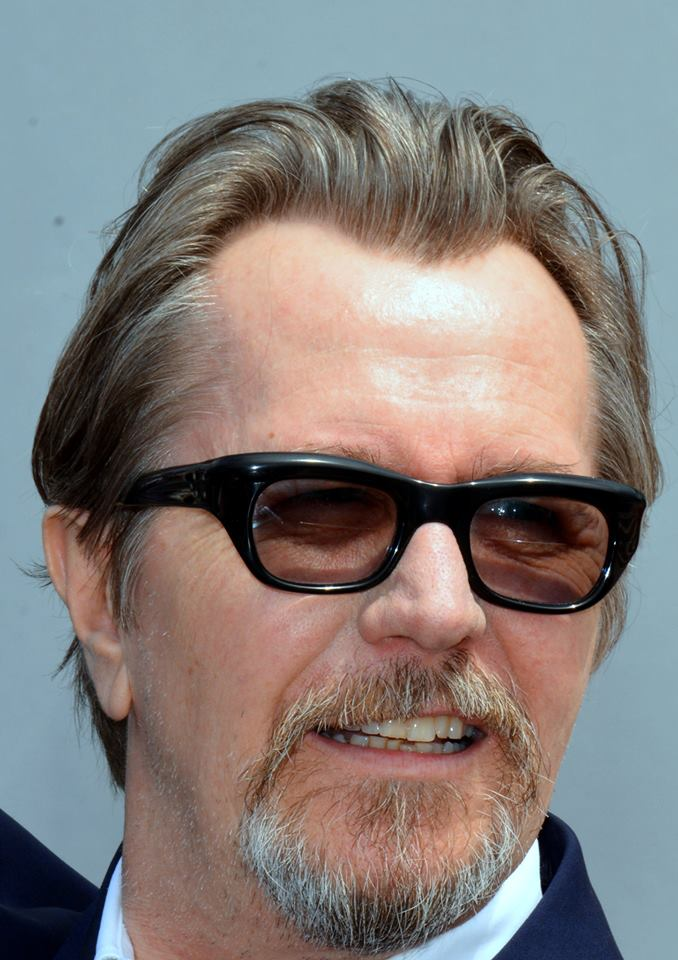
Gary Oldman

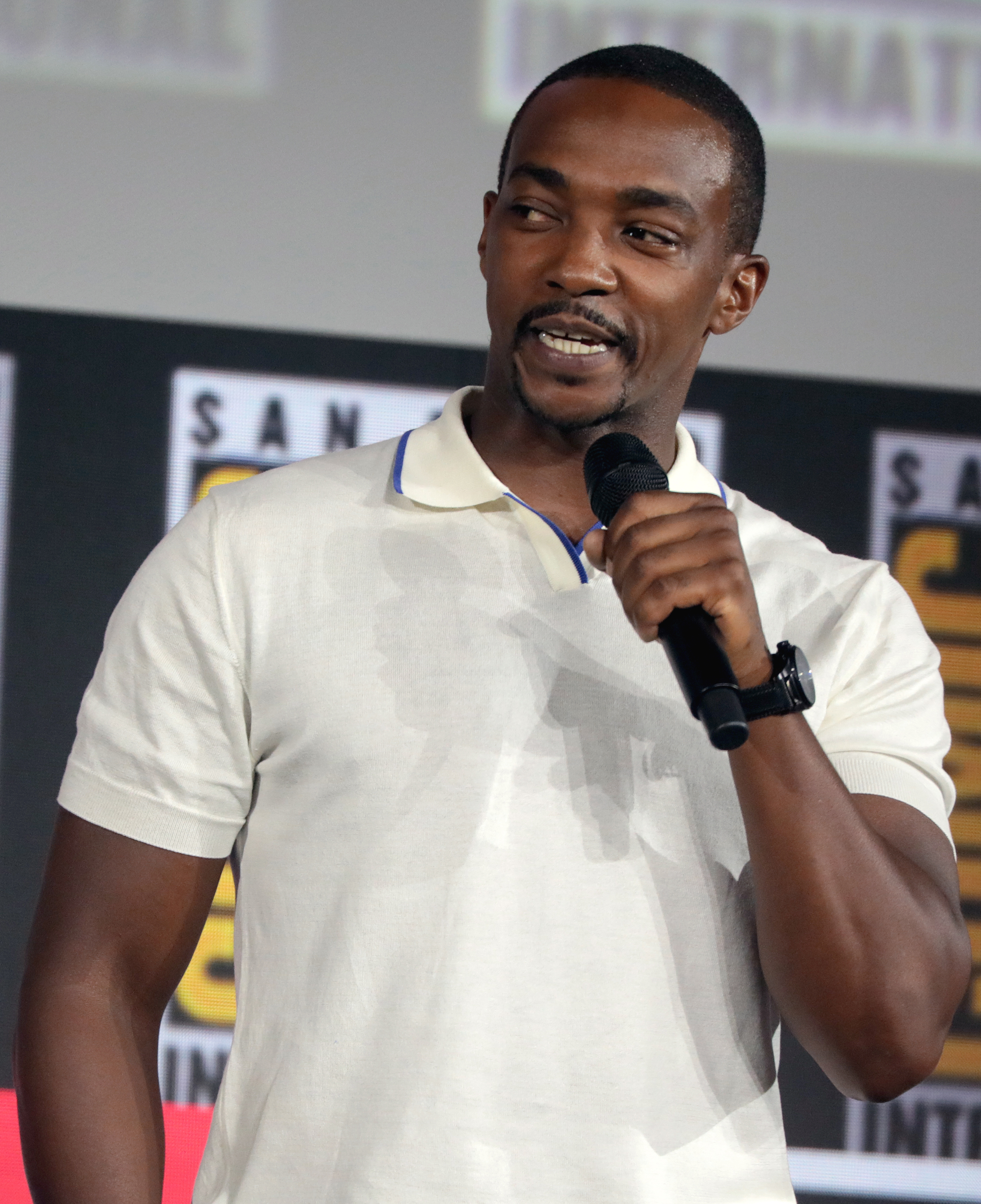
Anthony Mackie

- Amy Adams as Dr. Anna Fox, a child psychologist who suffers from agoraphobia
- Gary Oldman as Alistair Russell, Anna's neighbor
- Anthony Mackie as Edward Fox, Anna's estranged husband
- Fred Hechinger as Ethan Russell, Alistair's teenage son
- Wyatt Russell as David Winter
- Brian Tyree Henry as Detective Little
- Julianne Moore as Katherine Melli
- Jennifer Jason Leigh as Jane Russell
- Jeanine Serralles as Detective Norelli
- Tracy Letts as Dr. Karl Landy, Anna's psychiatrist
- Mariah Bozeman as Olivia Fox
- Ben Davis as Steve

== Production ==
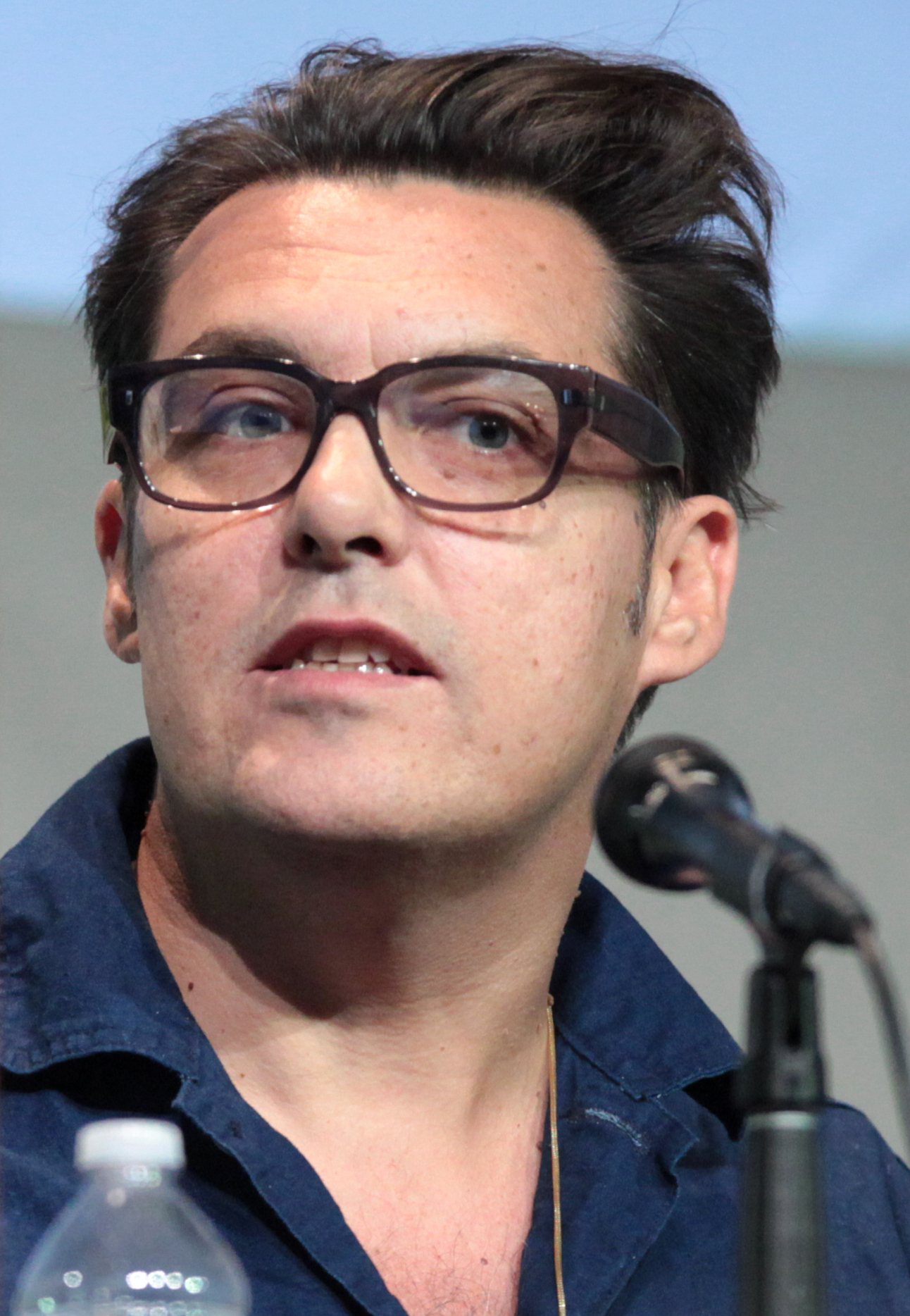
Director Joe Wright

In September 2016, Fox 2000 Pictures acquired screen rights to the novel of the same name by A.J. Finn. In March 2018, it was announced Joe Wright would direct the film, from a screenplay by Tracy Letts, with Scott Rudin and Eli Bush serving as producers on the film. This marks Rudin's final film credit before his stepping back from the film industry. In April 2018, Amy Adams was set to star, and in July 2018, Julianne Moore, Wyatt Russell, Gary Oldman and Brian Tyree Henry joined the cast of the film. In August 2018, Fred Hechinger and Anthony Mackie were also added.

Principal photography began in New York City on August 6, 2018, and wrapped on October 30. Rudin later hired Tony Gilroy to perform rewrites for reshoots, following the film's initial delay from the October 4, 2019, release date. The score was originally set to be composed by Trent Reznor and Atticus Ross, but they were replaced by Danny Elfman.

== Release ==
The Woman in the Window was originally scheduled to be theatrically released on October 4, 2019, by 20th Century Fox, but on July 9, 2019, it was delayed, with Fox's new owner Walt Disney Studios Motion Pictures re-editing the film after test screenings, and a new release date of May 15, 2020, was set. On March 17, 2020, the film was removed from the release calendar due to the COVID-19 pandemic, with the intent to reschedule it for later in 2020. On August 3, 2020, it was announced that Netflix was in final talks to acquire the distribution rights to the film from 20th Century Studios, which it did, releasing it on its streaming service on May 14, 2021. It was the final film to be released under the Fox 2000 label; as part of the Walt Disney Company's acquisition of 21st Century Fox, the label was discontinued.

According to director Joe Wright, the final product was "watered down" from its original version, resulting in the negative reviews. Wright expressed an openness to a director's cut version in the future.

The film was the twenty-ninth best performing Netflix titles of 2021.

== Reception ==
On the review aggregator website Rotten Tomatoes, 25% of 217 critics' reviews are positive, with an average rating of 4.6/10. The website's consensus reads: "A milquetoast and muddled thriller that drowns in its frenzied homages, The Woman in the Window will have audiences closing their curtains." Metacritic, which uses a weighted average, assigned the film a score of 41 out of 100, based on 39 critics, indicating "mixed or average" reviews.

Many critics commented that the film's release after more than a year of COVID-19 lockdowns ironically made for timely viewing, with The Hollywood Reporter saying the film's "homebound protagonist has become that much more understandable to audiences", and Decider calling it "the perfect post-lockdown catharsis."

Adams' performance and the film's visuals were praised. Rolling Stone's David Fear wrote, "A versatile actress who can go light (Enchanted), dark (Sharp Objects), or any shade in between…Adams has an uncanny knack for bringing a woman-next-door quality to most of her roles". Christy Lemire of RogerEbert.com said, "Director Joe Wright puts many of his showy camerawork instincts on display, making Adams' character's Manhattan brownstone feel both cavernous and claustrophobic." Stephanie Zacharek of Time called it the film a "coolly tasteful psychological thriller." GQ praised it as "a camp masterpiece" with "avant garde-ish flair." Zacharek added, "The picture is enjoyable not so much for its twisty plot…as for its artful dedication to its own highly theatrical, drapes-drawn somberness."

The excesses of the plot and its contrivances were widely panned. Fear stated viewers "will need to endure an Overlook Hotel-level maze of plot twists", and A.O. Scott of The New York Times said the film "resembles other psychological thrillers about women in distress…without being terribly thrilling or psychologically insightful". NPR's Linda Holmes said, "Inventiveness means using the formula to do something meaningfully new, and that's where this film falls short."

Owen Gleiberman of Variety criticized some of the dialogue in Tracy Letts' screenplay as "weirdly stilted" and said one of the drawbacks is that the narrator is made to be "so unreliable that we can't tell where her grand delusions leave off" and where the film's objective action begins. Lemire noted the film could have used more of Anna's character development, as "the underlying trauma [Anna's] working through gives the film some genuine heft." She concluded the film "offers a lot of build-up, a lot of possibility. But the revelation of what's truly going on here is anticlimactic—the equivalent of closing the curtains and turning away from the window with a disappointed sigh."

The film was seen as a disappointment given the level of talent involved. Justin Chang of the Los Angeles Times wrote "the most interesting thing here may be the marshaling of so many smart people in service of a misfire that probably seemed like an intuitive showcase for their talents. In the scripts he's adapted from his own plays ('Bug,' 'Killer Joe'), Letts has demonstrated his facility for staging psychological breakdowns in close quarters. And Wright, in his own previous literary adaptations…has proven admirably willing to treat the camera as an active participant in the telling, using the formal resources of cinema to liberate his stories as much as possible from the printed page. It hasn’t always worked, but the results have never been dull." Others pointed out that actors such as Julianne Moore, Gary Oldman, and the "wildly charismatic" Brian Tyree Henry felt underused. Holmes expressed that "if there had been a way to make the film more of a two-hander between [Adams and Henry] as she tries to convince him to believe her, it might have felt like a stronger story."

Some reviewers saw the film as a positive and perceptive exploration of grief and agoraphobia. S. E. Smith of Bitch Media wrote the film "explores disability in an intimate way, yet ultimately returns to a cultural status quo".

=== Accolades ===
Year	Award	Category	Recipient(s)	Result	Ref.
2022	Golden Raspberry Awards	Worst Picture		Nominated	
2022	Golden Raspberry Awards	Worst Director	Joe Wright	Nominated	
2022	Golden Raspberry Awards	Worst Actress	Amy Adams	Nominated	
2022	Golden Raspberry Awards	Worst Screenplay	Tracy Letts	Nominated	
2022	Golden Raspberry Awards	Worst Prequel, Remake, Rip-off or Sequel	The Woman in the Window (rip-off of Rear Window)	Nominated	

== See also ==
- Rear Window (1954)
- Gone Girl (2014)
- The Woman in the House Across the Street from the Girl in the Window
