= End of Story =

2024 novel by A. J. Finn

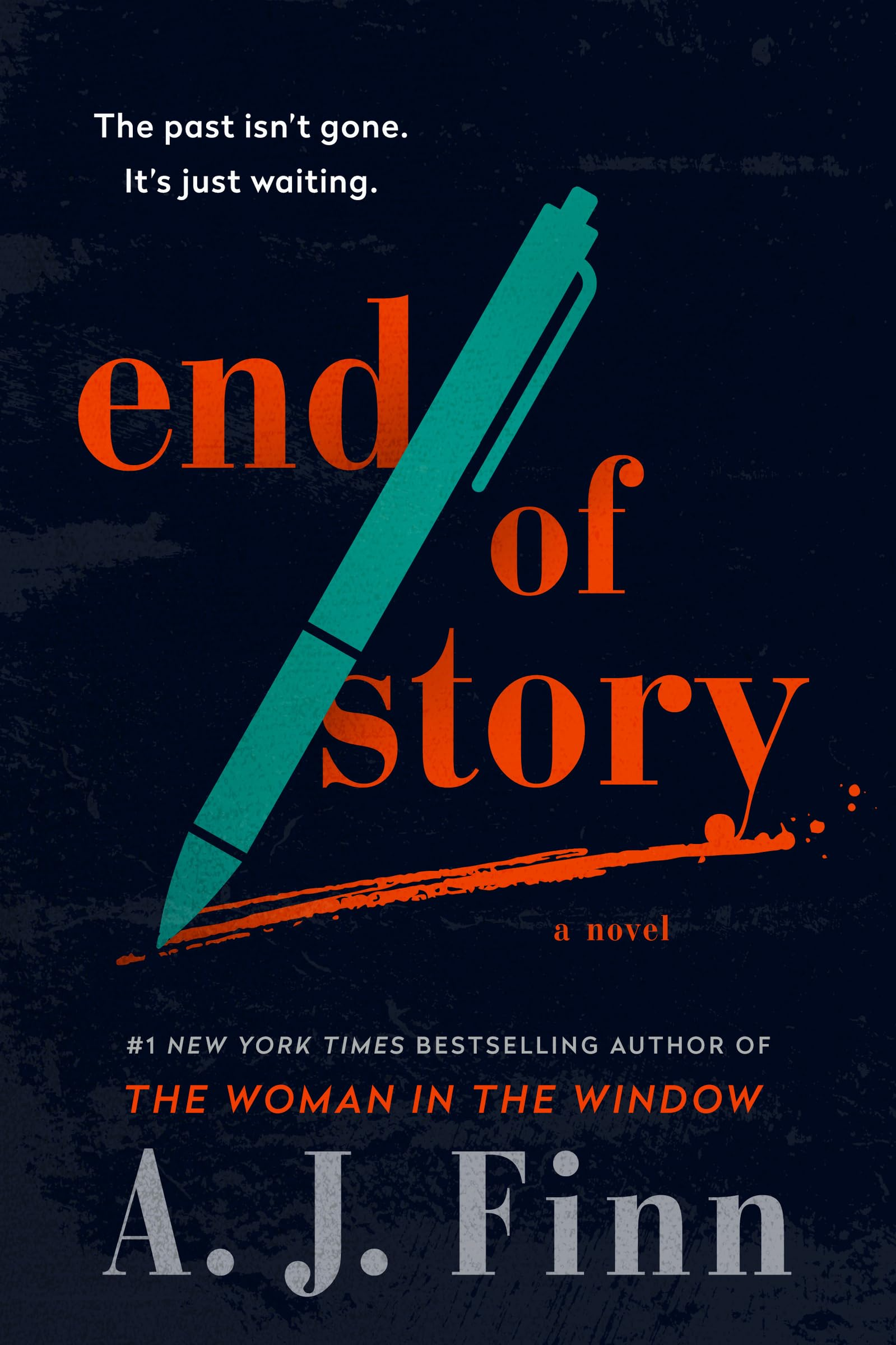
- The U.S. edition of End of Story
- Author: A. J. Finn
- Language: English
- Genre: Thriller
- Published: February 20, 2024
- Publisher: HarperCollins
- Publication place: United States
- Pages: 416
- ISBN: 9780062678454

End of Story is a novel by American author A. J. Finn and published by HarperCollins on February 20, 2024 (United States) and February 29, 2024 (United Kingdom). Set in San Francisco, it is a thriller about a young woman writing the biography of a celebrated crime writer. The novel follows Finn's 2018 debut novel The Woman in the Window.

The book debuted at number 12 on Publishers Weekly hardcover fiction list. The same publication gave the novel a starred review calling it a "tour de force" and a "spellbinder [that] surpasses the high bar set by Finn’s bestselling debut, The Woman in the Window."

Chris Hewitt of the Star Tribune praised the novel's plot and scene-setting, concluding that "Finn is an assured, witty writer with a gift for entertaining description and sharp instincts." Writing in the St. Louis Post-Dispatch, Gail Pennington noted the novel's unexpected plot twists and concluded that "Finn has crafted a book that is fresh, intelligent and — best of all — delightfully witty."

The Times of London noted "A cynic may think that Finn’s resolution is deliberately provocative; a critic may query the slow pacing," and concluded that Finn is "more skilful stylist than original auteur, there’s no doubt that he can write, and well." Kirkus Reviews also lamented, "If only the clever ending were worth the trouble it takes to get there." Writing in The Washington Post, author Nora Krug said of the story that "the plot drags on," and "the setup is complicated," concluding that readers may "quickly be hoping for end of story."
