= Man from Nebraska =

American Play by Tracy Letts

Man From Nebraska
- Written by: Tracy Letts
- Series: English

Premiere
- Date: November 20, 2003
- Place: Steppenwolf Theatre Company

Man From Nebraska is a play by American playwright Tracy Letts, which premiered in 2003 in Chicago. Man From Nebraska is about a man's loss of faith and his journey to regain it.

== Productions ==
The play had its world premiere at Steppenwolf Theatre Company in Chicago, Illinois on November 20, 2003. Directed by Anna D. Shapiro, the cast featured Rick Snyder (Ken), Rondi Reed (Nancy) and Michael Shannon (Harry Brown). The play ran at the South Coast Repertory Theatre, Costa Mesa, California in March 2006, starring Brian Kerwin and Kathy Baker and directed by William Friedkin.

The play was a 2004 Pulitzer Prize for Drama finalist.

The play premiered Off-Broadway at the Second Stage Theatre, marking its New York debut, starting January 26, 2017 in previews, officially on February 15, 2017. The cast features Reed Birney (Ken), Nana Mensah (Tamyra), Max Gordon Moore (Harry Brown), Annette O'Toole (Nancy Carpenter), Kathleen Peirce (Cammie Carpenter), William Ragsdale (Reverend Todd) and Heidi Armbruster (Pat). The production is directed by David Cromer. The play has had its run extended by 2 weeks, to March 26.

== Synopsis ==
Ken Carpenter, previously a devoted Baptist, suddenly finds that he no longer believes in God. Ken's wife, Nancy, is shocked and uncomfortable with Ken's sudden loss of faith and initiates a meeting between Ken and their pastor. During his discussion with Ken, the Reverend learns that Ken's life is going fairly well, except for his mother's declining mental and physical health, and he hasn't taken a vacation in decades. The Reverend suggests that Ken should get out of Lincoln, and after some coaxing, Ken accepts the idea of going on a vacation by himself.

While travelling to London the woman seated next to him, Pat, asks about Ken's marriage. She explains to Ken that she is divorced, but that “I get laid whenever I want”. She then describes how she caught her ex-husband in the act of cheating on her. In spite of his apparent lack of interest, Pat mentions that she might stop by Ken's hotel some time to see him.

In London, Ken meets a woman named Tamyra, who is the bartender at his hotel. They talk and become fairly well acquainted with one another. She also manages to get Ken to drink some alcohol, although he previously didn't drink.

Act two begins with Ken in the bar talking with Tamyra, when Pat walks into the bar. Later, Ken and Pat are at her place, kissing and moving towards her bed. After she gets him to the bed and sets up a pair of handcuffs, he starts having second thoughts, and tries to get up. Pat continues to try to seduce him. She then tells him he needs to tie her down, and take control of her with leather straps. He is incredibly reluctant, and again tries to leave. By the end of the scene it is suggested that Pat gets what she wants. Pat and Ken never make contact again.

While Ken is in London, Nancy remains at home in Nebraska. Ken's daughter, Ashley, is extremely angry at her father and tells Nancy that if her husband ran off, she would have divorced him instantly. Although she continues to be shocked and hurt, Nancy explains that she will try to work things out with Ken when he returns.

In London, Ken continues his acquaintance with Tamyra and her flatmate, Harry. Harry and Ken get off to a rocky start, but the two work out their differences and Ken begins taking sculpture lessons from Harry. Both begin work on sculptures of Tamyra, who poses as their model.

After Ken learns from his daughter, Ashley, that his mother has died, Ken finds himself at Harry and Tamyra's flat, urgently wishing to speak with Tamyra. Harry informs Ken that she is out of town with a friend. Ken explains that his mother has died, and doesn't know what to do, or where to go. Harry suggests that they work on their sculptures.

Ken makes an attempt at working on his sculpture, but finds himself smashing it into a new form, twisting it and making it entirely different than it was before. Ken quickly finishes what he was doing, and gives Harry a nod as he grabs his coat, and leaves.

Back in Nebraska for his mother's funeral, Ken speaks with Ashley, who is incredibly displeased with her father. She tells him that she and her husband both think he is going to go to hell. Nancy then comes over to him, hesitantly. She is confused about how to act, and how to feel. She is conflicted with joy to see her husband after many weeks, but also irate that he has been gone for so long, and not spoken to her once.

Ken explains to Nancy that he has found his love and faith in God once again, and tries to persuade her that he is better and wants to be with her again. With reluctance, she finally accepts his hand as they walk off stage.

== Critical reception ==
Reviews were mixed. The TheatreMania reviewer wrote: "Letts has created two very intriguing characters in Ken and Nancy, but though he has provided a believable shock to their complacency, his follow-through is a letdown." The Variety reviewer noted "[Letts] succeeds quite well at expressing the empty feelings of a man experiencing a crisis of faith, but is far less successful at finding drama or meaning — or just raw, abstract emotional power — in his search to fill this emptiness."

The Chicago Tribune reviewer noted, in a review of a local Chicago production in 2011 that the play is "... a bridge between the violent working-class gothic antics of Killer Joe and Bug and the epic angst-with-verbal-fireworks of the now-legendary "August: Osage County." Man from Nebraska suggests that being lost and uncertain is our destiny. The best you can hope for is another person groping their way in the dark beside you."
