= Fred M. Hechinger =

American editor

- Born: July 7, 1920; Nuremberg, Germany
- Died: November 6, 1995 (aged 75); Manhattan, New York, United States
- Citizenship: American
- Education: DeWitt Clinton High School
- Alma mater: City College of New York
- Spouse: Grace Bernstein
- Children: 2
- Relatives: Fred Hechinger (grandson)
- Writing career
- Notable awards: George Polk Award

Fred M. Hechinger (July 7, 1920 – November 6, 1995) was a German-born American education editor at The New York Times from 1959 to 1990.

== Life and career ==
Hechinger was born in 1920 in Nuremberg, Germany, the son of Lily (Niedermaier) and Dr. Julius Hechinger. His family was Jewish. He came to the U.S. in 1936. He earned his bachelor's degree at City College of New York, where he wrote for the student newspaper, The Campus. He served in the U.S. Army during World War II, where he was a military intelligence officer posted at the War Office in London. He was discharged in 1946 with the rank of master sergeant.

After the war, Hechinger was a student at University of London and then a foreign correspondent for the Overseas News Agency. He then became an education journalist, writing for The Times of London, The New York Herald Tribune (where he became education editor in 1950), and The Washington Post, as well as Harper's. He also spent three years in Bridgeport, Connecticut, as associate publisher and executive editor of the Bridgeport Sunday Herald.

Hechinger spent the majority of his career at The New York Times, joining in 1959 and retiring in 1990. He was an education writer who also served at times on the paper's editorial board, as president of The New York Times Company Foundation, and a president of Times Neediest Cases Fund (from 1977 until his retirement).

After retiring from the Times, Hechinger became senior adviser to the Carnegie Corporation of New York. He was also a member of the National Advisory Committee for the Yale-New Haven Teachers Institute. He died on November 7, 1995, at the age of 75, of cardiac arrest, at his home on Manhattan's Upper East Side.

== Family ==
He married Grace Bernstein; they had two sons, Paul D. Hechinger and John E. Hechinger. His grandson is actor Fred Hechinger.

== Legacy ==
The Fred M. Hechinger Grand Prize for Distinguished Education Reporting was established by Education Writers Association.

The Hechinger Report (a project of the Hechinger Institute on Education and the Media) at Teachers College, Columbia University, was named for him after he served as a Teachers College trustee since 1992.

The Fred M. Hechinger Education Journalism Award is awarded by the Columbia Journalism School.

His papers are held at the Hoover Institution.

== Awards ==
- 1989 George Polk Career Award
- 1980 Foreign Language Advocate Award, Northeast Conference on the Teaching of Foreign Languages.
- 1952 James L. Fisher Award for Distinguished Service to Education
- 1950 George Polk Award, Education Reporting
- 1949 George Polk Award, Suburban Reporting

== Works ==
- "About Education; A New Elitism Appears in Higher Education", The New York Times, Fred M. Hechinger, November 20, 1984
- "The University's Neglected Task", Address by Fred M. Hechinger, December 5, 1991
- "Are Schools Better in Other Countries?", In defense of the American public school, Editor Arthur J. Newman, Transaction Publishers, 1978, ISBN 978-0-87073-999-6
- "Sving Youth from Violence", Crossroads: the quest for contemporary rites of passage], Editors Louise Carus Mahdi, Nancy Geyer Christopher, Michael Meade, Open Court Publishing, 1996, ISBN 978-0-8126-9190-0
- "Textbooks and Education", Public education under criticism, Editors Cecil Winfield Scott, Clyde Milton Hill, Ayer Publishing, 1954, ISBN 978-0-8369-2520-3
- "Eight Weeks in America", The Magpie, June 1937, v. 21, n. 2., p. 12.
- An Adventure in Education: Connecticut Points the Way, Macmillan, 1956
- The Big Red Schoolhouse Doubleday, 1959; Smith, Peter Publisher, Inc., January 1990, ISBN 978-0-8446-1229-4
- Teen-Age Tyranny Morrow, 1963
- The New York Times Guide to New York City Private Schools, Simon & Schuster, 1968
- Growing Up in America McGraw-Hill, 1975
