= The Woman in the Window (novel) =

2018 novel by A. J. Finn

- Author: A. J. Finn
- Language: English
- Genre: Thriller
- Published: January 2, 2018
- Publisher: William Morrow
- Publication place: United States
- Media type: Print (hardcover and paperback), audiobook, e-book
- Pages: 448 (hardcover)
- ISBN: 9780062678416

The Woman in the Window is a thriller novel by American author A. J. Finn, published by William Morrow on January 2, 2018. It hit #1 on the New York Times bestseller list. The book follows the life of Dr. Anna Fox who has agoraphobia and lives a reclusive life at her large home in New York City, where she one day witnesses a murder across the street. A film adaptation by the same name directed by Joe Wright and starring Amy Adams in the title role was released by Netflix in 2021.

== Plot ==
Dr. Anna Fox has agoraphobia due to a traumatic car accident and lives a reclusive life at her large home in New York City. She recently separated from her husband, Ed, who has custody of their nine-year-old daughter Olivia. However, they frequently talk on the phone.

To pass the time, Anna spends her days drinking too much alcohol, playing online chess, communicating with other recluses through the "Agora online forum", watching old movies, and meeting with her shrink and physical therapist. She also spends time spying on her neighbors, including the Russells, a family that moved in across the street. There is Ethan, the reserved and polite teenage son; Alistair, the controlling father; and Jane, a friendly woman with whom Anna shares many interests. One evening, while looking out the window, Anna witnesses Jane being stabbed and calls the police. The Russells deny that any sort of attack took place. The police, including detectives Little and Norelli, also don't believe Anna's story as another woman who claims to be Jane is alive and uninjured. Anna insists the woman claiming to be Jane is not the same woman she met before.

Anna has a number of encounters with the Russells and becomes convinced that something is suspicious about them. After she receives an anonymous email with a picture of herself sleeping, she calls the police. A detective confronts her with the tragic truth: Her husband and daughter died in the car accident that triggered her agoraphobia, and she has been imagining her conversations with them. Knowing her medications can cause hallucinations, they theorize that Anna could have taken the picture and emailed it to herself. Anna realizes that the murder may have been a hallucination as well.

Anna finds a picture she had taken of the Jane she met and shows it to Ethan. He breaks down and tells her the truth: Jane and Alistair are his adoptive parents, and Katie, the woman Anna assumed was Jane, is his biological mother. Katie tracked down the family in order to see her son again, but her frequent unwanted visits led to an altercation with Jane, which resulted in Katie being stabbed. Alistair and Jane hid the body and lied to the police.

Anna urges Ethan to talk to the police, but he convinces her that he will talk his parents into turning themselves in. Ethan later sends a text confirming he and his parents are going to the police. That night, Anna realizes that Ethan mentioned something that he couldn't have known. She is startled by Ethan in her room, where he confesses that he has psychopathic tendencies, that he has been sneaking into her home at night to watch her, and that he has stalked other women as well. He reveals that he was the one who killed Katie because of his resentment about the abuse and neglect he faced as a child under her care, and that his father knew, but kept it a secret to protect Jane.

Realizing that he intends to kill her too, Anna flees. He pursues her to the roof where she pushes him through an old skylight to his death. Alistair is arrested as an accessory to Katie's murder, and Anna slowly starts her life over again.

== Characters ==
- Anna Fox, a reclusive 39-year-old woman who has severe agoraphobia and anxiety
- Ed Fox, Anna's husband, who died the previous year in a car accident where Anna was driving
- Olivia Fox, Anna's 9-year-old daughter who also died
- Ethan Russell, the shy and polite teenage son who lives across the park and becomes friends with Anna
- Jane Russell, Ethan's mother and Alastair's wife, who Anna believed she saw murdered
- Alistair Russell, an intimidating man who Anna believes stabbed and killed Jane
- David Winters, Anna's tenant who lives in the basement of her large home and frequently does house work for the neighborhood
- Dr. Julian Fielding, Anna's therapist who visits her once a week
- Bina, Anna's physical therapist who works on helping her recover from the car accident

== Reception ==
The novel was a commercial and critical success. It stayed at number one for two weeks on the New York Times best sellers list.

In a review in the New Yorker, Joyce Carol Oates called it "a superior example of a subset of recent thrillers featuring 'unreliable' female protagonists who, despite their considerable handicaps [...] manage to persevere and solve mysteries where others have failed" and says the lead character "ultimately seems more a function of the plot than a fully realized person, not quite as interesting as her problems". Janet Maslin in The New York Times said, "A book that's as devious as this novel will delight anyone who's been disappointed too often" and that it holds up "pretty well, but there are problems" with writing that "is serviceable, sometimes bordering on strange." Kirkus Reviews wrote, "Crackling with tension, and the sound of pages turning, as twist after twist sweeps away each hypothesis you come up with about what happened in Anna’s past and what fresh hell is unfolding now."

The book was shortlisted for the 2019 British Book Awards in the "Crime & Thriller" category.

== Influences ==
A. J. Finn has cited genre work such as Rear Window, Gaslight, and Gone Girl as inspirations for The Woman in the Window.

== Film adaptation ==
A Netflix film based on the novel directed by Joe Wright, with a screenplay by Tracy Letts and starring Amy Adams, Gary Oldman, Anthony Mackie, Fred Hechinger, Wyatt Russell, Brian Tyree Henry, Jennifer Jason Leigh, and Julianne Moore was released on May 14, 2021. Time called the movie a "coolly tasteful psychological thriller." GQ praised it as "a camp masterpiece" with "avant garde-ish flair." The Hollywood Reporter described it as a "neo-Gothic diversion with a strong central performance" whose "homebound protagonist has become that much more understandable to audiences." The film was among the best performing titles on Netflix in 2021.

== Plot similarities ==
In 2019, the New York Times investigated what it described as "numerous, and detailed" plot similarities and "nearly identical plot twists in the final act" between The Woman in the Window and another psychological thriller, Sarah A. Denzil's Saving April.

Saving April was released in March 2016, with The Woman In The Window coming out in January 2018.

Five days after the article's publication, The Times reviewed original outlines of The Woman in the Window, which were said to have been sent by Mallory to his literary agent at ICM, dated September 20, 2015 and October 4, 2015. The Times concluded that "Some of the overlapping plot points, including the fact that both protagonists were fighting with their husbands about infidelity before the car crashes, and that the psychopathic teenager tortured animals, while not in the original outline, were contained in the October version". It noted that Ms. Denzil began writing Saving April." later in October 2015.

In addition, the director of 1995 film Copycat, Jon Amiel, also noted similarities from The Woman In The Window to his own movie. The main character of Copycat, Helen Hudson, is an agoraphobic who is pursued by a killer, drinks heavily and plays online chess. Amiel told the New Yorker this was "not actionable, but certainly worth noting", adding: "One would have hoped that the author might have noted it himself".

In a follow-up piece, the New York Times quoted Harvard copyright law expert Rebecca Tushnet who explained that there are many "well-worn tropes in thrillers," and Stuart Karle of Columbia Journalism School who stated that "great fiction builds on prior works in terms of both language and sense of place."

== Bibliography ==
- Finn, A. J. (January 2018). The Woman in the Window (First ed.). New York, NY: William Morrow and Company. ISBN 978-0-06-267841-6. OCLC 1293226856.
