= Copycat (1995 film) =

1995 thriller film by Jon Amiel

- Theatrical release poster
- Directed by: Jon Amiel
- Written by: Ann Biderman; David Madsen
- Produced by: Arnon Milchan; Mark Tarlov
- Starring: Sigourney Weaver; Holly Hunter; Dermot Mulroney; William McNamara; Will Patton; John Rothman; J. E. Freeman; Harry Connick Jr.
- Cinematography: László Kovács
- Edited by: Jim Clark
- Music by: Christopher Young
- Production company: Regency Enterprises
- Distributed by: Warner Bros.
- Release date: October 27, 1995
- Running time: 123 minutes
- Country: United States
- Language: English
- Budget: $27 million
- Box office: $79 million

Copycat is a 1995 American psychological thriller horror film directed by Jon Amiel and starring Sigourney Weaver, Holly Hunter, and Dermot Mulroney. The score was composed by Christopher Young. The film follows a criminal psychologist and a homicide detective who must work together to find a serial killer who is committing copycat crimes modeled after notorious murderers.

Principal photography began on October 3, 1994, in the San Francisco Bay Area. The film was theatrically released by Warner Bros. on October 27, 1995. It was a moderate box office success and received positive reviews for the performances of its leads, writing, and direction. It proved very successful in the video rental market, becoming the 11th most-rented film in the United States for 1996.

== Plot ==
After giving a guest lecture on criminal psychology at a university, Dr. Helen Hudson, a field expert on serial killers, is cornered in the lecture hall's restroom by one of her previous subjects, Daryll Lee Cullum, who has escaped from prison. He kills a police officer and attacks Helen. Another cop subdues Cullum, and he is returned to prison. After the attack, Hudson becomes severely agoraphobic, sealing herself inside her apartment, conducting her entire life from behind a computer screen, and supported by her live-in assistant, Andy.

When a series of similar murders spreads fear across San Francisco, homicide detective M.J. Monahan and her partner, Ruben Goetz, solicit Helen's expertise. Initially reluctant, Helen finds herself drawn into the warped perpetrator's game of wits. As the murders continue, Helen realizes that the elusive assailant draws inspiration from notorious serial killers, including Albert DeSalvo, The Hillside Strangler, David Berkowitz, Jeffrey Dahmer, and Ted Bundy. When the murderer begins stalking Helen, they enlist aid from Cullum, who tells them where the killer will be next.

The police are unable to intercept the killer, as (in an unrelated incident at the police station) a suspect accesses a gun and takes Ruben hostage. The suspect attempts to leave but is shot by M.J., only to get back up, shooting and killing Ruben. M.J. feels guilty for not fully neutralising the man. She opts to remain working and to continue searching for the serial killer alone.

After another murder, Helen realizes that the copycat killer has been following the list of serial killers in the same order that she presented them in her university lecture the night she was attacked. They realise he will emulate Jeffrey Dahmer next but do not know where and when he will strike.

After Andy is picked up by the killer in a club and killed in a manner reminiscent of Dahmer, a witness from the club identifies the killer as a man named Peter Foley, who was known to the police as he had been corresponding with Cullum. After a failed attempt to capture him at his house, M.J. reaches Helen's residence. She discovers that Peter has kidnapped Helen and left a video asking M.J. to guess where he has taken Helen. M.J. returns to where Cullum previously attempted to kill her – the lecture hall restroom. Upon arriving, she finds Helen bound, hanged, and gagged in the same manner Cullum previously did. Foley shoots M.J. in the chest, unaware that she is protected by a bulletproof vest, and knocks her unconscious.

As Foley prepares to kill M.J., Helen attempts to sabotage Foley's replicated crime scene by hanging herself. Foley panics and cuts Helen down, and the two struggle. Helen escapes to the building's roof as Foley corners her. However, just as Foley is about to kill Helen, M.J. appears and shoots him in the arm, giving Foley one last chance to surrender. When he pulls his gun on her, M.J. shoots him repeatedly, killing him. Some time later, Cullum writes to another one of his followers, instructing him on how to kill Helen, and revealing that he had been aiding Foley all along.

== Cast ==
- Sigourney Weaver as Dr. Helen Hudson
- Holly Hunter as Inspector Mary Jane "M.J." Monahan
- Dermot Mulroney as Inspector Ruben Goetz
- Harry Connick Jr. as Daryll Lee Cullum
- William McNamara as Peter Foley
- J. E. Freeman as Lieutenant Thomas Quinn
- Will Patton as Inspector Nicoletti
- John Rothman as Andy
- Shannon O'Hurley as Susan Schiffer
- Bob Greene as Pachulski
- Tony Haney as Kerby
- Nick Scoggin as Conrad
- Kenny Kwong as Chinese Kid
- Rebecca Klinger as Peter's Wife
- Keith Phillips as Felix Mendoza
- Kelvin Han Yee as Chinese Inspector
- Russ Christoff as Commissioner Petrillo
- Thomas Fieweger as Officer Bodger

== Production ==
Early versions of the screenplay had the character of M.J. Monahan written as a man, and included a romantic plot line between Monahan and Helen Hudson. Director Jon Amiel reconfigured the script to center on two women instead, commenting, "I just stumbled onto the notion of making the cop a woman. We already had a great female character in the psychologist. So I thought, 'Why not have two females in the lead, and just get rid of the love story altogether?' With two women, we could put an entirely different perspective on the violence and make it a movie about women dealing with violence against women rather than a movie exploiting violence against women. And then I stumbled onto a second realization--that I'd never seen a full-on suspense drama before with two women in the lead". Jay Presson Allen was brought on for uncredited script rewrites.

Sigourney Weaver prepared for her role by consulting with forensic psychiatrist Park Dietz.

Amiel chose to set Copycat in San Francisco because he liked "the idea of contrasting a physically beautiful city with horrendously cruel human events". Filming locations included Potrero Hill, Twin Peaks, Pacific Heights, and Fort Mason. Interior shots were filmed on sound stages constructed in an old warehouse on Treasure Island.

The film had a troubled post-production process involving multiple edits in response to test screenings. Alan Heim, the film's original editor, was fired and replaced with Jim Clark after the film struggled in its first round of audience previews. Clark's recuts were met with increasingly weaker audience scores, with the main sticking point being the original ending, which showed the killer kidnapping Monahan instead of Hudson. Frank Darabont was brought in to script new scenes and reshoots took place in June 1995. The subsequent cut was successful enough for Warner Bros. to give the film a theatrical release.

== Soundtrack ==
Copycat: Original Motion Picture Soundtrack

Soundtrack album by Various Artists
- Released: October 27, 1995
- Genres: Film music, soundtrack
- Length: 63:05
- Label: Milan Records

All tracks composed by Christopher Young, unless otherwise noted.

1. "Get Up to This" by New World Beat
2. "Carabu Party" by Steven Ray
3. "Techno Boy" by Silkski (Jerome Evans)
4. "Main Title from Copycat"
5. "Stick Him or Shoot Him"
6. "Housebound"
7. "Silent Screams"
8. "Murder's an Art"
9. "In Darkness"
10. "Take a Life"
11. "Next to the Devil"
12. "Pastoral Horror"
13. "Silhouette"
14. "Gallows"
15. "Butchers and Bakers"
16. "Panic"
17. "Who's Afraid"
18. "Lay Me Down"
19. "The Barber of Seville: Largo al factotum" by Roberto Servile/Failoni Chamber Orchestra/Will Humburg
20. "Tosca: Vissi D'arte" by Gabriela Beňačková/The Czech Philharmonic Orchestra/Bohumil Gregor
21. "Requiem (Fauré): In Paradisum, Requiem Op. 48" (choral work)

== Reception ==
=== Critical reception ===
The film received positive reviews from critics. It holds an approval rating of 76% on Rotten Tomatoes, based on 58 reviews, with an average rating of 6.5/10. The consensus summarizes: "Copycat's outstanding cast helps this often unpleasant thriller transcend the less palatable elements of its standard-issue story." Audiences polled by CinemaScore gave the film an average grade of "A−" on an A+ to F scale.

Roger Ebert of the Chicago Sun-Times awarded it three and a half stars out of four, and a "thumbs up" on Siskel & Ebert, citing Holly Hunter's character as "one of the most intriguing and three-dimensional characters of the year". Multiple reviews praised both Weaver and Hunter's performances, with Ebert commenting that "the relationship between M. J., so small and forcible, and Hudson, so large and timid...creates the center of the movie". Writing for the San Francisco Chronicle, Peter Stack said "Weaver's bravura performance as an accomplished professional reduced to a trembling wreck is her most memorable, complex work to date."

Many critics noted that while the film arrived on the heels of critical and commercial success Seven, Copycat manages to retain its own share of thrills and suspense. The Washington Post's Rita Kempley commented that because Copycat "depicts the victimization of women through the eyes of its female protagonists, the film really has more in common with The Silence of the Lambs". The film's use of two female leads was also praised by critics as a welcome change from male buddy cop films. The New York Times' Janet Maslin wrote that the film "can recall unsettling aspects of other thrillers – Vertigo, Wait Until Dark, The Silence of the Lambs, [and] Dirty Harry...but [it] has a personality of its own". David Ansen of Newsweek commended Amiel on the use of computers to genuinely chilling effect.

More critical reviews focused on the contrivances and implausibilities of the script, with some calling the ending predictable. In a negative review, Kenneth Turan of the Los Angeles Times commented on the larger trend of serial killer films, expressing "Copycat seems pornographically intent on pushing the envelope of what is acceptable for thrillers on screen. If the trend continues it is not at all pleasant to contemplate where everything will end."

Writing on the film's 20th anniversary for The A.V. Club, Alex McLevy said the film "is the work of a talented director, cinematographer, and actors all elevating an oft-clumsy script into a smart and gripping yarn", adding it "sneaks some interesting and subtle themes about gender and interpersonal relationships into its cat-and-mouse games". In 2023, critic Dennis Schwartz described Copycat as "one of the better thrillers of the 1990s".

The film is recognized by American Film Institute in these lists:

- 2001: AFI's 100 Years...100 Thrills – Nominated

=== Box office ===
The film grossed $32 million in the United States and Canada and $79 million worldwide.

== Plagiarism controversy ==
A 2019 New Yorker article noted that A. J. Finn's bestselling debut novel The Woman in the Window (2018) has the same setup, without attribution, as Copycat. When notified of this, director Jon Amiel said, "Wow. [It's probably] not actionable, but certainly worth noting, and one would have hoped that the author might have noted it himself."
