= Thelma (2024 film) =

Film by Josh Margolin

- Theatrical release poster
- Directed by: Josh Margolin
- Written by: Josh Margolin
- Produced by: Zoë Worth; Chris Kaye; Benjamin Simpson; Karl Spoerri; Viviana Vezzani; Nicky Weinstock
- Starring: June Squibb; Fred Hechinger; Richard Roundtree; Clark Gregg; Parker Posey; Malcolm McDowell
- Cinematography: David Bolen
- Edited by: Josh Margolin
- Music by: Nick Chuba
- Production company: Bandwagon
- Distributed by: Magnolia Pictures (United States and Canada); Universal Pictures (International)
- Release dates: January 18, 2024 (Sundance); June 21, 2024 (United States)
- Running time: 98 minutes
- Country: United States
- Language: English
- Budget: $3 million
- Box office: $13 million

Thelma is a 2024 American comedy-drama film written, directed, and edited by Josh Margolin. The film stars June Squibb as a woman who falls victim to a phone scam, and sets out to find the perpetrators with the help of her grandson (Fred Hechinger) and a friend (Richard Roundtree, in his final role). Clark Gregg, Parker Posey, and Malcolm McDowell also star.

Thelma premiered at the 2024 Sundance Film Festival on January 18, 2024, and was released in the United States by Magnolia Pictures on June 21, 2024. The film received positive reviews and was named one of the top ten independent films of 2024 by the National Board of Review.

== Plot ==
93-year-old Thelma Post lives alone in Los Angeles. Her loving grandson, Daniel "Danny" Markowitz, often visits and looks after her needs despite not taking responsibility for his own life. Although Thelma is close with Danny, she finds his constant assistance patronizing.

A phone scammer posing as Danny calls Thelma, claiming he has been arrested. Thelma sends $10,000 to a local address as instructed. After a panic involving her daughter Gail and son-in-law Alan, Thelma finds out Danny is safe and she was scammed. Unable to get help from the police and unwilling to let the scammer get away with her money, Thelma evades her family and sets out to the address to retrieve it.

Thelma attempts to contact old friends for a favor but discovers most of them have died or moved away. She reluctantly enlists the help of Ben, a friend and widower living in assisted living, whom she had been ignoring since her husband's death. They ride Ben's expensive 2-person scooter to the home of Mona, their elderly acquaintance. Thelma steals Mona's gun while Ben distracts her. Meanwhile, Danny, Gail, and Alan realize Thelma is missing and search for her to no avail. During an argument with his parents, Danny vents about his recent breakup with his girlfriend and his lack of skills aside from looking after Thelma, fearing he will go nowhere.

Thelma and Ben get lost in a shady neighborhood, near the scammer's address. Ben insists on turning back, but Thelma refuses. They argue, and Ben chastises Thelma for her avoidance of him and her unwillingness to allow people to help her, which reminds him of how his impaired hearing prevented him from registering his late wife's fall years earlier until it was too late. Thelma admits she didn't need him, just his scooter. Ben’s scooter is then destroyed by a reckless driver, prompting him to abandon Thelma. Thelma continues alone on foot, eventually suffering a fall. She realizes she can not get up on her own and gives up hope until Ben returns to assist her and the two reconcile.

Thelma and Ben reach the address, where a young man collects Thelma's money from a PO box. They follow him to a rundown antique store. Ben listens through their connected phones while Thelma sneaks in and discovers the owner, Harvey, and his grandson Michael running a scam operation in the backroom. Thelma demands her money back, but they refuse, and Harvey grabs her arm. Harvey, who relies on an oxygen regulator and his grandson, laments that his store is failing and has resorted to scamming people to stay financially stable. Thelma pretends not to know who they are and apologizes for being a nuisance. Once seated, she pulls Mona's gun on Harvey. Michael tries to escape but is knocked out by Ben outside. Thelma uses Harvey’s computer while Ben holds Harvey at gunpoint, but struggles with the banking system. She calls Danny for help, and he guides her through transferring the money while driving to pick them up. Michael re-enters the store, but Thelma tells him that Harvey talks down about him, leading Michael to abandon his grandfather. Thelma leaves Harvey $500 of the $10,000 transfer and scolds him for tricking people and not appreciating his grandson, then shoots his computer so that Harvey cannot continue his scamming operation. Thelma and Ben exit the store triumphantly before Danny picks them up.

Thelma is reunited with her family, and they watch Ben perform in a play at the nursing home. She has a newfound respect for Ben, and they plan to get together shortly. While visiting her husband's gravesite with Danny, Thelma assures her grandson that he will be fine when she is eventually gone. As Danny drives Thelma home, they talk in the car about how incredible it is that the trees are still alive, no matter how gnarled their roots look. A mid-credits scene shows writer/director Josh Margolin having an identical conversation with his grandmother.

== Cast ==
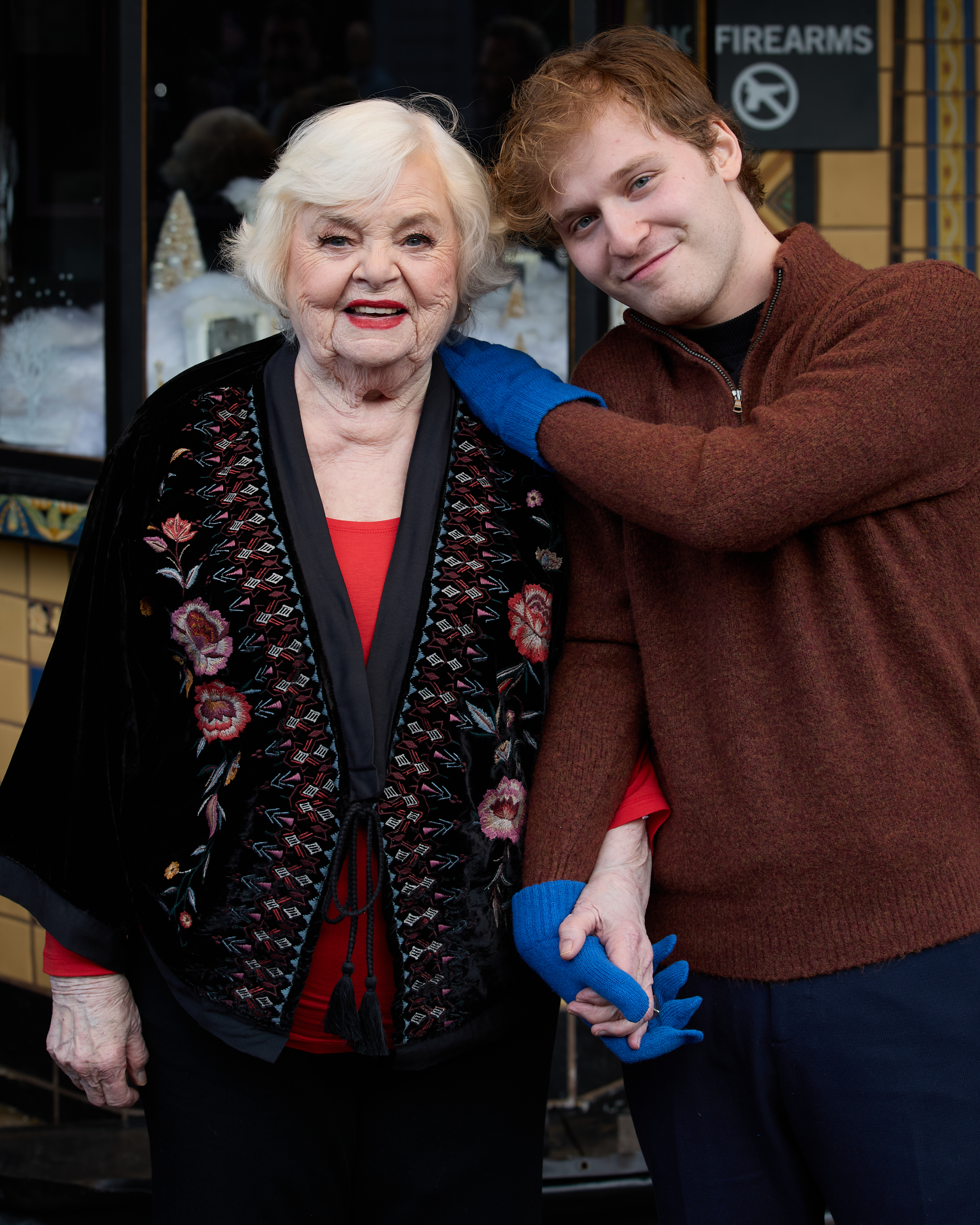
June Squibb and Fred Hechinger at the 2024 Sundance Film Festival.

- June Squibb as Thelma
- Fred Hechinger as Daniel
- Richard Roundtree as Ben
- Parker Posey as Gail
- Clark Gregg as Alan
- Malcolm McDowell as Harvey
- Nicole Byer as Rochelle
- Quinn Beswick as Colin
- Coral Peña as Allie
- Aidan Fiske as Michael
- Bunny Levine as Mona
- Ruben Rabasa as Winston

== Production ==
Thelma Post is the actual name of Margolin's grandmother who was the target of a phone scam. In that case her family intervened before the scam was completed, but it inspired Margolin to write the screenplay.

== Release ==
Thelma premiered at the Sundance Film Festival on January 18, 2024. It was released theatrically in the United States by Magnolia Pictures on June 21, 2024. It was released in the United Kingdom on July 19, 2024, by Universal Pictures.

This is Roundtree's final feature film, released after he died in 2023.

== Reception ==
=== Box office ===
Thelma grossed $9 million in the United States and Canada, and $4 million in other territories, for a worldwide total of $13 million.

In the United States and Canada, Thelma was released alongside The Bikeriders and The Exorcism. It grossed $2.3 million from 1,290 theaters in its opening weekend, finishing in eighth.

=== Critical response ===
On the review aggregator website Rotten Tomatoes, 98% of 191 critics' reviews are positive, with an average rating of 7.7/10. The website's consensus reads: "A stellar showcase for the talented June Squibb, Thelma avoids cheap laughs as it finds the lighter side of some serious issues." Metacritic, which uses a weighted average, assigned the film a score of 77 out of 100, based on 42 critics, indicating "generally favorable" reviews.

Filmmakers Kelly Fremon Craig, Paul Feig, Lance Oppenheim and Daniel Scheinert all cited Thelma as among their favorite films of 2024, with praise mostly directed towards Squibb's performance.

=== Accolades ===
| Award/Festival | Date of ceremony | Category | Recipient(s) | Result | Ref. |
|---|---|---|---|---|---|
| Cleveland International Film Festival | April 14, 2024 | American Independents Competition | Thelma | Won | |
| Sarasota Film Festival | April 15, 2024 | Best Narrative Feature | Thelma | Won | |
| Calgary Underground Film Festival | May 2, 2024 | People's Choice Award | Thelma | Won | |
| Mendocino Film Festival | May 30, 2024 | Best Narrative Feature | Thelma | Won | |
| Provincetown International Film Festival | June 21, 2024 | Audience Award - Narrative Feature | Thelma | Won | |
| Astra Midseason Movie Awards | July 3, 2024 | Best Indie | Thelma | Nominated | |
| Hollywood Music in Media Awards | November 20, 2024 | Original Score – Independent Film | Nick Chuba | Nominated | |
| Astra Film Awards | December 8, 2024 | Best Truly Indie Feature | Thelma | Nominated | |
| San Diego Film Critics Society Awards | December 9, 2024 | Best Comedic Performance | June Squibb | Won | |
| St. Louis Film Critics Association | December 15, 2024 | Best First Feature | Josh Margolin | Nominated | |
| Austin Film Critics Association | January 6, 2025 | Best First Film | Josh Margolin | Nominated | |
| AARP Movies for Grownups Awards | January 11, 2025 | Best Actress | June Squibb | Nominated | |
| AARP Movies for Grownups Awards | January 11, 2025 | Best Intergenerational Movie | Thelma | Won | |
| Critics' Choice Movie Awards | January 12, 2025 | Best Comedy | Thelma | Nominated | |
| Satellite Awards | January 26, 2025 | Best Motion Picture – Comedy or Musical | Thelma | Nominated | |
| Satellite Awards | January 26, 2025 | Best Actress in a Motion Picture – Comedy or Musical | June Squibb | Nominated | |
| Saturn Awards | February 2, 2025 | Best Independent Film | Thelma | Nominated | |
| Saturn Awards | February 2, 2025 | Best Actress in a Film | June Squibb | Nominated | |
| Artios Awards | February 12, 2025 | Outstanding Achievement in Casting – Feature Studio or Independent Film (Comedy) | Jamie Ember | Nominated | |
| Independent Spirit Awards | February 22, 2025 | Best Lead Performance | June Squibb | Nominated | |
| Alliance of Women Film Journalists | January 7, 2025 | Best Actress | June Squibb | Nominated | |
| Alliance of Women Film Journalists | January 7, 2025 | Best Women's Breakthrough Performance | June Squibb | Nominated | |
| Alliance of Women Film Journalists | January 7, 2025 | Best Stunt Performance | June Squibb | Won | |
| Critics' Choice Super Awards | August 7, 2025 | Best Actress in an Action Movie | June Squibb | Won | |
