= Tracy Letts =

American actor, playwright, and screenwriter

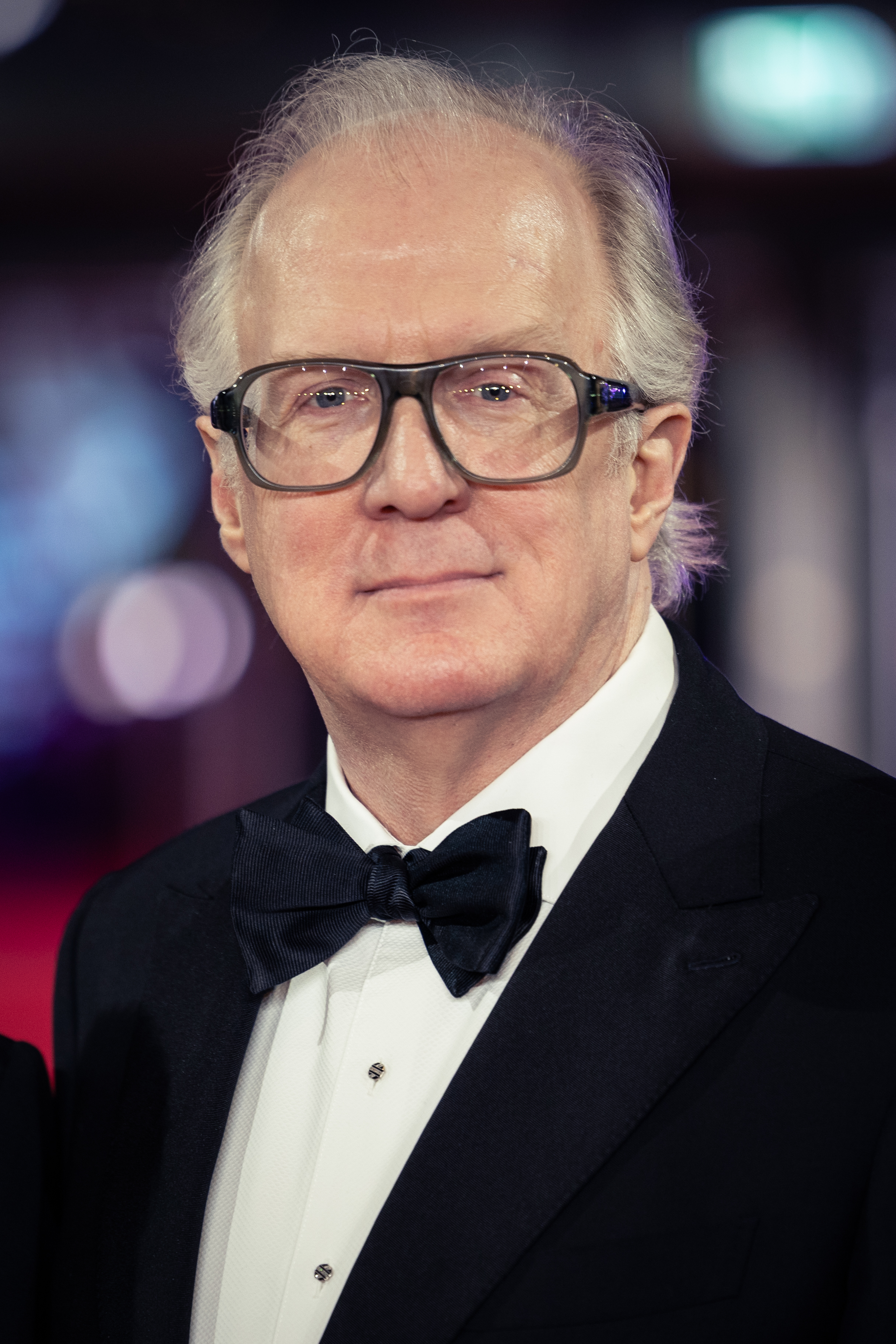
- Letts in 2026
- Born: Tracy Shane Letts; July 4, 1965 (age 61); Tulsa, Oklahoma, U.S.
- Occupations: Playwright; screenwriter; actor
- Years active: 1988–present
- Spouse: Carrie Coon (m. 2013)
- Children: 2
- Parent(s): Billie Letts; Dennis Letts
- Awards: Pulitzer Prize for Drama; Tony Award for Best Play; Tony Award for Best Actor in a Play

Tracy Shane Letts (born July 4, 1965) is an American actor, playwright, and screenwriter.

As a playwright, Letts' works include Killer Joe, Man from Nebraska, August: Osage County, and The Minutes. In 2008, he received the Pulitzer Prize for Drama and the Tony Award for Best Play for August: Osage County.

As a stage actor, Letts has performed in various classic plays with the Steppenwolf Theatre since 1988. He made his Broadway acting debut as George in the revival of Edward Albee's play Who's Afraid of Virginia Woolf?, which earned him a Tony Award for Best Actor in a Play in 2013. He continued acting on the Broadway stage in All My Sons and The Minutes. On television, he is known for his portrayal of Andrew Lockhart in seasons 3 and 4 of Showtime's Homeland from 2013 to 2014. He played Jack McKinney in the HBO sports drama series Winning Time: The Rise of the Lakers Dynasty (2022–2023); for this role, he was nominated for the Primetime Emmy Award for Outstanding Guest Actor in a Drama Series in 2024. On film, he has portrayed Henry Ford II in James Mangold's sports drama Ford v Ferrari (2019) and Mr. Dashwood in Little Women, a 2019 film adaptation of Louisa May Alcott's novel of the same name.

Letts adapted three of his plays into films: Bug (2006) and Killer Joe (2011), both directed by William Friedkin; and August: Osage County (2013), directed by John Wells.

== Early life ==
Letts was born in Tulsa, Oklahoma, to author Billie Letts (née Gipson), a college professor, and actor Dennis Letts. He has two brothers, Shawn, a musician, and Dana. He grew up in Durant, Oklahoma, and graduated from Durant High School in the early 1980s. He moved to Dallas, where he waited tables and worked in telemarketing while beginning his acting career. He appeared in Jerry Flemmons's O Dammit!, which was part of a new playwrights' series sponsored by Southern Methodist University.

== Career ==
=== Theatre ===
Letts moved to Chicago at the age of 20, working for the next 11 years at Steppenwolf Theatre Company and Famous Door. He is still an active member of Steppenwolf. He was a founding member of Bang Bang Spontaneous Theatre, whose members included Greg Kotis, Michael Shannon, Paul Dillon, and Amy Pietz. In 1991, Letts wrote the play Killer Joe. Two years later, the play premiered at the Next Lab Theater in Evanston, Illinois, followed by the 29th Street Rep in New York City. Since then, Killer Joe has been performed in a number of countries in 12 languages.

Letts has written a number of plays. His most famous, August: Osage County, premiered at the Steppenwolf Theatre in Chicago on June 28, 2007. It had its Broadway debut at the Imperial Theatre on December 4, 2007; the production transferred to Broadway's Music Box Theatre on April 29, 2008. The Broadway show closed on June 28, 2009, after 648 performances and 18 previews. In 2008, the show was nominated for seven Tony Awards; it won six Tony Awards, including Best Play. The play won Letts the Pulitzer Prize for Drama in 2008. Letts has also been a finalist for the Pulitzer drama prize for his plays Man from Nebraska and The Minutes; the Pulitzer committee described The Minutes as a "shocking drama set in a seemingly mundane city council meeting that acidly articulates a uniquely American toxicity that feels both historic and contemporary."

Letts's plays have depicted people struggling with moral and spiritual questions. He says he was inspired by the plays of Tennessee Williams and the novels of William Faulkner and Jim Thompson. He has said that he considers sounds to be effective "storytelling tools" for theater.

During the late 1980s through the late 2000s, Letts acted in many of the Steppenwolf Theatre Company's productions, starring in Steve Martin's Picasso at the Lapin Agile (1994). In 2012, he gained attention for his Broadway debut performance in the revival of Edward Albee's Who's Afraid of Virginia Woolf? at the Booth Theatre. He received positive reviews and won the Tony Award for Best Actor in a Play in 2013. In 2019, he appeared in the Broadway revival of Arthur Miller's All My Sons with Annette Bening at Roundabout Theatre Company's American Airlines Theatre. The show officially opened on April 22, 2019, and closed on June 23, 2019. Letts starred in the 2022 Broadway production of The Minutes; this was his first time acting in one of his own plays.

=== Television ===
Early in his acting career, in the 1990s through the mid-2000s, Letts acted in TV shows including Prison Break, The District, Strong Medicine, Profiler, Judging Amy, The Drew Carey Show, Seinfeld, Early Edition, and Home Improvement. In 2013–14, he joined the cast of Showtime's Homeland as US Senator Andrew Lockhart. He was nominated with the rest of the cast for the Screen Actors Guild Award for Best Ensemble.

In 2016, Letts joined HBO's marital comedy–drama Divorce. In 2018, Letts was cast in the second season of USA Network's anthology crime drama series The Sinner, opposite Bill Pullman and Carrie Coon. He played Jack McKinney in HBO's 2022-2023 series Winning Time: The Rise of the Lakers Dynasty. In 2024, he received a nomination for the Primetime Emmy Award for Outstanding Guest Actor in a Drama Series for his work on that series.

=== Film ===
Letts starred in Adam McKay's 2015 ensemble piece The Big Short, 2016's Wiener-Dog, Christine, and Elvis & Nixon, and James Schamus's film adaptation of the Philip Roth novel Indignation, as well as the true-story crime thriller adaptation Imperium. Letts appeared in the 2017 films The Lovers, The Post, and Lady Bird.

In 2019, Letts portrayed Henry Ford II in James Mangold's sports drama film Ford v Ferrari, and played Mr. Dashwood in Little Women, a film adaptation of Louisa May Alcott's novel of the same name.

Letts has written screenplays for three feature films based on his plays: Bug (directed by William Friedkin), Killer Joe (also directed by Friedkin); and August: Osage County (directed by John Wells). He also wrote the screenplay for the 2021 Netflix feature film The Woman in the Window, starring Amy Adams, based on the eponymous psychological thriller by A. J. Finn.

== Personal life ==
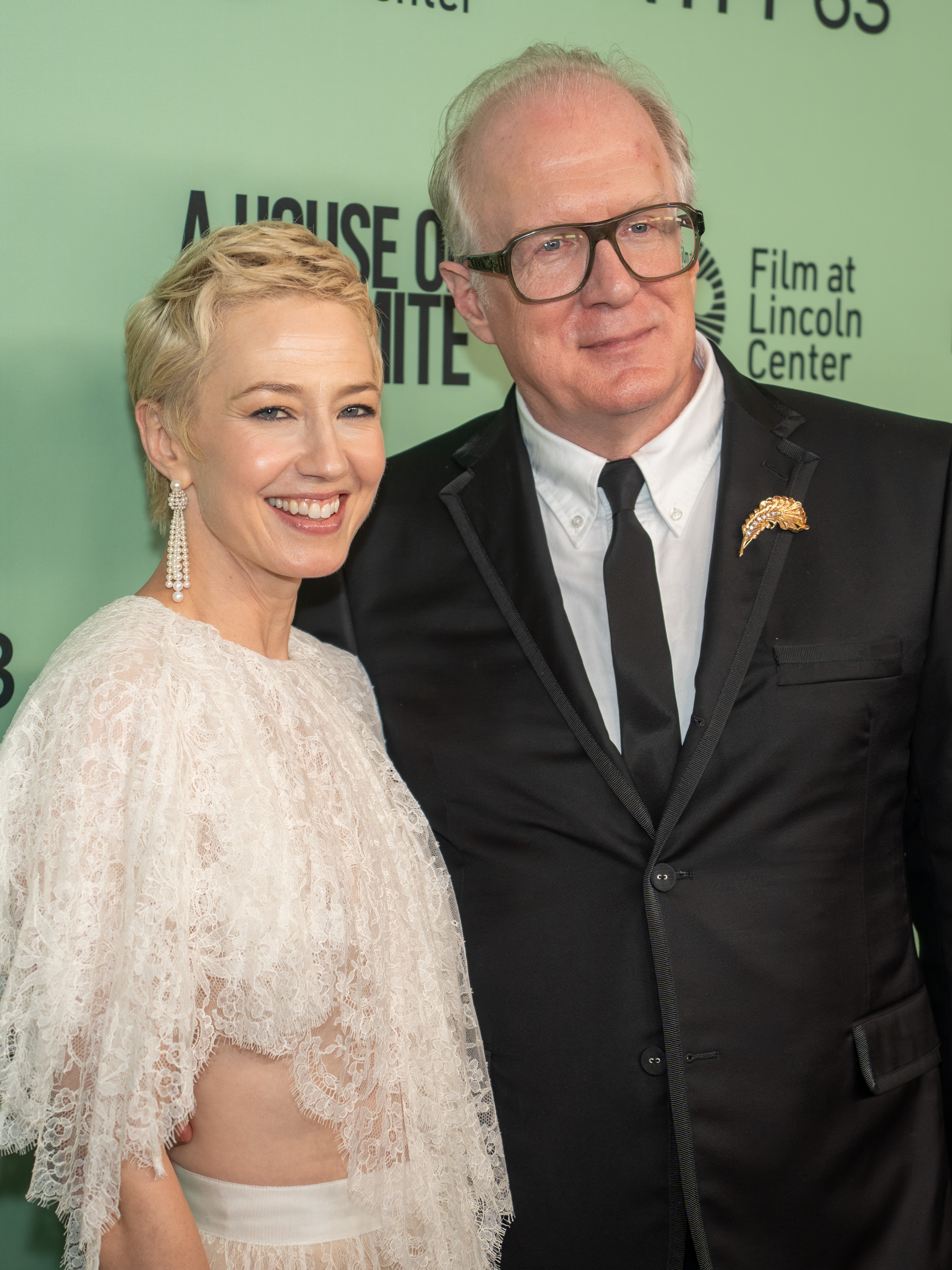
Carrie Coon with Letts at the New York Film Festival in 2025.

Letts married actress Carrie Coon in September 2013. They have two children, born in 2018 and 2021. Letts was previously engaged to actress Sarah Paulson, and was in a relationship with actress Holly Wantuch until her unexpected death in 1998. He has been sober since 1993.

== Work as a writer ==
=== Theater ===
Year	Title	Notes	Ref.
1993	Killer Joe		
1996	Bug		
2003	Man from Nebraska		
2007	August: Osage County		
2008	Superior Donuts		
2009	Three Sisters	Adaptation	
2015	The Stretch		
2016	Mary Page Marlowe		
2017	Linda Vista		
2017	The Minutes		
2021	Night Safari		
2021	The Old Country		

=== Screenwriter ===
Year	Title	Notes
2006	Bug	Adaptation of his play
2007	Cop Show	Short film
2011	Killer Joe	Adaptation of his play
2013	August: Osage County	Adaptation of his play
2021	The Woman in the Window	

== Work as an actor ==
=== Theater ===
Year	Title	Role	Theatre
1988	The Glass Menagerie		Chicago, Steppenwolf Theatre
1991–1995	Bang Bang Spontaneous Theatre	Various characters	Chicago, No Exit Cafe
1994	Picasso at the Lapin Agile	Freddy	Chicago, Steppenwolf Theatre
1999	Three Days of Rain	Walker	Chicago, Steppenwolf Theatre
2001	Glengarry Glen Ross	John Williamson	Chicago, Steppenwolf Theatre
2002	The Dazzle	Langley Collyer	Chicago, Steppenwolf Theatre
2002	Miracle on 34th Street	Lawyer	Chicago Center for Performing Arts
2003	Homebody/Kabul	Quango Twistleton	Chicago, Steppenwolf Theatre
2004	The Dresser	Norman	Chicago, Steppenwolf Theatre
2005	Last of the Boys	Ben	Chicago, Steppenwolf Theatre
2005	Orson's Shadow	Kenneth Tynan	Off-Broadway, Barrow Street Theatre
2005	The Pain and the Itch	Cash	Chicago, Steppenwolf Theatre
2006	The Pillowman	Tupolski	Chicago, Steppenwolf Theatre
2006	The Well-Appointed Room	Stewart	Chicago, Steppenwolf Theatre
2007	Betrayal	Robert	Chicago, Steppenwolf Theatre
2009	American Buffalo	Walter "Teach" Cole	Chicago, Steppenwolf Theatre
2010	Who's Afraid of Virginia Woolf?	George	Chicago, Steppenwolf Theatre
2012	Who's Afraid of Virginia Woolf?	George	Broadway, Booth Theatre
2014	The Realistic Joneses	Bob Jones	Broadway, Lyceum Theatre
2019	All My Sons	Joe Keller	Broadway, American Airlines Theatre
2020	The Minutes	Mayor Superba	Broadway, Cort Theatre
2022	The Minutes	Mayor Superba	Broadway, Studio 54
2027	Death of a Salesman	Willy Loman	Royal National Theatre, London

=== Film ===
Year	Title	Role	Notes
1988	Paramedics	Van Owner	
1992	Straight Talk	Sean	
1998	Chicago Cab	Sports Fan	
1998	U.S. Marshals	Sheriff Poe	
1999	Guinevere	Zack	
2007	Cop Show	Michael Cooke	Short film
2015	The Big Short	Lawrence Fields	
2016	Wiener-Dog	Danny	
2016	Christine	Michael Nelson	
2016	Elvis & Nixon	John Finlator	
2016	Indignation	Hawes D. Caudwell	
2016	Imperium	Dallas Wolf	
2017	The Lovers	Michael	
2017	Lady Bird	Larry McPherson	
2017	The Post	Fritz Beebe	
2019	Ford v Ferrari	Henry Ford II	
2019	Little Women	Mr. Dashwood	
2020	French Exit	Franklin "Small Frank" Price (voice)	
2021	The Woman in the Window	Dr. Landy	Uncredited
2021	Ghostbusters: Afterlife	Jack	Uncredited
2022	Deep Water	Don Wilson	
2023	Eric Larue	Bill Verne	
2024	McVeigh	Richard Snell	
2024	Saturday Night	Herb Sargent	
2025	A House of Dynamite	General Anthony Brady	
2026	Rosebush Pruning	The Father	
2026	The Liberation	Reuben Cooper	
2026	I Play Rocky	Sandy Maddox	
TBA	Liminal	TBA	Filming

=== Television ===
Year	Title	Role	Notes
1995	Home Improvement	Henry	Episode: "Jill's Surprise Party"
1996–1997	Early Edition	Jonathan / Marksman	2 episodes
1997	Seinfeld	Counterguy	Episode: "The Strike"
1998	The Drew Carey Show	Lomax	Episode: "Drew and the Conspiracy"
1999	Judging Amy	Mr. Kleinman	Episode: "Pilot"
2000	Profiler	Mr. Adams	Episode: "Train Man"
2001	Strong Medicine	Ken	Episode: "Wednesday Night Fever"
2001	The District	Brad Gilroy	Episode: "Melt Down"
2006	Prison Break	Peter Tucci	2 episodes
2013–2014	Homeland	Senator/Director Andrew Lockhart	17 episodes
2016–2019	Divorce	Nick	17 episodes
2017	Comrade Detective	Vasile (voice)	Episode: "No Exit"
2018	The Sinner	Jack Novack	7 episodes
2022–2023	Winning Time: The Rise of the Lakers Dynasty	Jack McKinney	9 episodes
2024	Mr. Throwback	Mitch Grossman	5 episodes
2024	The Simpsons	Himself (voice)	Episode: "Desperately Seeking Lisa"
2025	The Paper	John Stack	2 episodes
2025	The Lowdown	Frank Martin	6 episodes
2025	The American Revolution	Elbridge Gerry (voice)	Episode: "The Soul of All America (December 1777 - May 1780)"
2026	East of Eden	Cyrus Trask	1 episode

== Awards and nominations ==
Organizations	Year	Category	Work	Result	Ref.
Actor Awards	2012	Outstanding Ensemble in a Drama Series	Homeland (season three)	Nominated	
Actor Awards	2013	Outstanding Ensemble in a Drama Series	Homeland (season four)	Nominated	
Actor Awards	2017	Outstanding Cast in a Motion Picture	Lady Bird	Nominated	
Critics' Choice Movie Awards	2013	Best Adapted Screenplay	August: Osage County	Nominated	
Drama Desk Awards	2008	Outstanding Play	August: Osage County	Won	
Drama Desk Awards	2013	Outstanding Actor in a Play	Who's Afraid of Virginia Woolf?	Won	
Drama Desk Awards	2014	Outstanding Ensemble Performance	The Realistic Joneses	Won	
Drama League Awards	2019	Distinguished Performance	All My Sons	Nominated	
Primetime Emmy Awards	2024	Outstanding Guest Actor in a Drama Series	Winning Time: The Rise of the Lakers Dynasty (for "The New World")	Nominated	
Pulitzer Prize	2004	Drama	Man from Nebraska	Nominated	
Pulitzer Prize	2008	Drama	August: Osage County	Won	
Pulitzer Prize	2018	Drama	The Minutes	Nominated	
Razzie Awards	2022	Worst Screenplay	The Woman in the Window	Nominated	
Tony Awards	2008	Best Play	August: Osage County	Won	
Tony Awards	2013	Best Leading Actor in a Play	Who's Afraid of Virginia Woolf?	Won	
Tony Awards	2022	Best Play	The Minutes	Nominated	
Writers Guild of America Awards	2013	Best Adapted Screenplay	August: Osage County	Nominated	
