= David (2020 film) =

2020 American short film

- Directed by: Zach Woods
- Written by: Zach Woods; Brandon Gardner
- Produced by: Zach Woods; Kevin Chinoy; Francesca Silvestri; Andrew Porter; Lana Kim; Jett Steiger
- Starring: Will Ferrell; William Jackson Harper; Fred Hechinger; Corey Jantzen; Sebastian Vale
- Cinematography: Andre Lascaris
- Edited by: Nick Paley
- Production companies: Freestyle Picture Company; Ways & Means
- Distributed by: Salaud Morisset
- Release date: September 11, 2020 (TIFF)
- Running time: 12 minutes
- Country: United States
- Language: English

David is a 2020 American comedy-drama short film, directed by Zach Woods and written by Woods and Brandon Gardner. It stars Will Ferrell, William Jackson Harper and Fred Hechinger. It concerns a therapist's attempts to balance his relationships between his wrestler son and his suicidal patient, both named David. It is distributed worldwide by the International Production & Distribution company Salaud Morisset.

It had its world premiere at the 2020 Toronto International Film Festival on September 11, 2020. It was the only American short film selected for the 2020 Cannes Film Festival.

== Plot ==
David calls his therapist to schedule an appointment after having suicidal thoughts. As they are in the middle of a session, a young man in a wrestler's uniform runs up and bangs on the window. The therapist tells David to ignore him, but the young man comes in. It turns out that the young man, also named David, is the therapist's son and was preparing for a match he is to have with a "beast" named Andy Doan. The therapist was supposed to attend, but he chose to put it off in favor of helping David. Despite David saying it is okay to postpone the session, the therapist insists that he stay and that young David leave. Father and son get into an argument about their relationship and the therapist's insistence that David's problem is more important, despite David becoming more and more detached from the situation. When young David claims that he will get a wrestler's scholarship, the therapist tells him that he will not because he barely made the team, resulting in a short fight and young David telling him that he is not a good father. The therapist tells him that it is difficult to take back things that have been said and young David cries. David, sympathizing with young David, goes up and hugs him. Later, young David wrestles Andy Doan and loses almost immediately. As he stands back up, he looks into the crowd to see both his father and David, who stand up and applaud his effort, have come to see him and smiles.

== Cast ==
- Will Ferrell as Therapist
- William Jackson Harper as David
- Fred Hechinger as David
- Corey Jantzen as Andy Doan
- Sebastian Vale as Referee

== Release ==
The film had its world premiere at the Toronto International Film Festival on September 11, 2020. The film was initially set to world premiere at the 2020 Cannes Film Festival in May 2020, prior to its cancellation due to the COVID-19 pandemic. It was also set to screen at the Telluride Film Festival in September 2020, prior to its cancellation. It was released on the Team Coco YouTube channel on December 1, 2021.

== Awards ==
Since its launch, the film has been selected in many festivals around the world.

| Year | Festival | Award/Category | Status |
|---|---|---|---|
| 2021 | IE Short film festival | Special mention short film | |
| 2020 | Encounters International Film Festival | IMDbPro International Audience Award | Won |
| 2020 | AFI Fest | Live Action Short Film | Nominated |
| 2020 | 2020 Cannes Film Festival | Short Film Palme d'Or | Nominated |
| 2020 | Leeds International Film Festival | Louis le Prince International Short Film Competition | Nominated |
| 2020 | PÖFF Shorts | International Short Film Competition | Nominated |
| 2020 | Bogotá Short Film Festival | Best Fiction Short Film | Nominated |
