= Fred Hechinger =

American actor (born 1999)

- Fred Hechinger at the 2026 New York Film Festival
- Born: December 2, 1999 (age 26); New York City, U.S.
- Occupation: Actor
- Years active: 2018–present
- Relatives: Fred M. Hechinger (grandfather)

Fred Hechinger (/ˈhɛkɪndʒər/; born on December 2, 1999) is an American actor. He began his career with supporting roles in such films as the coming-of-age film Eighth Grade (2018), the period drama News of the World (2020), and the thriller The Woman in the Window (2021). Also in 2021, he starred in the Netflix horror The Fear Street Trilogy and the first season of the HBO anthology series The White Lotus.

Hechinger portrayed Seth Warshavsky in the miniseries Pam & Tommy (2022). In 2024, he starred in the comedy film Thelma and the drama film Nickel Boys, and portrayed Caracalla in the historical action film Gladiator II.

== Early life ==
Hechinger was born in New York City to parents Sarah Rozen and Paul Hechinger. His grandfather was The New York Times education editor Fred M. Hechinger. He grew up on the Upper West Side and attended Saint Ann's School, where his classmates included fellow actors Lucas Hedges and Maya Hawke. Hechinger was a teen reporter and studied at Upright Citizens Brigade. He is Jewish.

== Career ==
In 2018, Hechinger made his acting debut as Trevor in the coming-of-age dramedy film Eighth Grade. The following year, he co-starred in Marc Meyers' drama film Human Capital, which is based on Stephen Amidon's 2004 novel. It premiered at the Toronto International Film Festival and later released through DirecTV Cinema on March 20, 2020.

In 2020, Hechinger appeared in Paul Greengrass' Western film, News of the World, which starred Tom Hanks.

In 2021, he starred alongside Amy Adams in the Joe Wright-directed psychological thriller film The Woman in the Window; the movie had already been filmed prior to the COVID-19 pandemic.

He appeared as Simon Kalivoda in the Netflix horror films The Fear Street Trilogy, which were released in 2021. Hechinger's breakout role came in his performance as Quinn Mossbacher in the first season of HBO's The White Lotus, which was released in the same year.

In 2024, Hechinger appeared in Ridley Scott's historical epic film Gladiator II, portraying a fictionalized version of Roman Emperor Caracalla. Later that year, he appeared in the Sony's Spider-Man Universe film Kraven the Hunter, with Aaron Taylor-Johnson in the title role, in which he portrayed Dmitri Smerdyakov / Chameleon. He co-starred with Oscar nominee June Squibb in the 2024 film Thelma, which received a 98% rating on Rotten Tomatoes. It also starred Parker Posey, Clark Gregg, Malcolm McDowell and Richard Roundtree.

== Filmography ==
=== Film ===
Year	Title	Role	Notes	Ref.
2018	Eighth Grade	Trevor		
2018	Alex Strangelove	Josh		
2018	Vox Lux	Aidan		
2019	Human Capital	Jamie Manning		
2019	As They Slept	Alex	Short film	
2020	David	David	Short film	
2020	Let Them All Talk	Fred		
2020	News of the World	John Calley		
2021	The Woman in the Window	Ethan Russell		
2021	Italian Studies	Matt	Also co-producer	
2021	Fear Street Part One: 1994	Simon Kalivoda		
2021	Fear Street Part Two: 1978	Simon Kalivoda	Archive footage	
2021	Fear Street Part Three: 1666	Isaac		
2022	Butcher's Crossing	Will Andrews		
2022	The Pale Blue Eye	Cadet Randolph Ballinger		
2023	Hell of a Summer	Jason Hochberg	Also producer	
2024	Thelma	Danny	Also executive producer	
2024	Nickel Boys	Harper		
2024	Pavements	Bob Nastanovich		
2024	Gladiator II	Caracalla		
2024	Kraven the Hunter	Dmitri Smerdyakov / Chameleon		
2025	Preparation for the Next Life	Skinner		
2025	Marty Supreme	Troy		
2026	A Long Winter	Mike	Completed	
2027	The Cackling of the Dodos	TBA	Filming	

=== Television ===
Year	Title	Role	Notes	Ref.
2021	The Underground Railroad	Young Arnold Ridgeway	Miniseries, 2 episodes	
2021	The White Lotus	Quinn Mossbacher	Main role (season 1)	
2022	Pam & Tommy	Seth Warshavsky	Miniseries, 4 episodes	
2024	In the Know	Ginsberg	Voice; episode: "Thinksgiving"	

=== Music videos ===
Year	Song	Artist	Role	Notes	Ref.
2018	"World Class Cinema"	Gus Dapperton	Coffee Guy		
2019	"To Love a Boy"	Maya Hawke	Jimbo		
2019	"Never Said"	Samia	N/A		
2020	"Triptych"	Samia	N/A	Director	
2021	"Show Up"	Samia	N/A	Cameo	
2021	"The Blue Hippo"	Maya Hawke	N/A	Director	
2025	"Pants"	Samia	N/A		

== Awards and nominations ==
Year	Award	Category	Nominated work	Result	Ref.
2021	Pena de Prata	Best Ensemble in a Limited Series or Anthology Series or TV Special	The Underground Railroad	Nominated	
2021	Pena de Prata	Best Ensemble in a Limited Series or Anthology Series or TV Special	The White Lotus	Won	
