= Killer Joe (film) =

2011 film by William Friedkin

- Theatrical release poster
- Directed by: William Friedkin
- Screenplay by: Tracy Letts
- Based on: Killer Joe by Tracy Letts
- Produced by: Nicolas Chartier; Scott Einbinder
- Starring: Matthew McConaughey; Emile Hirsch; Juno Temple; Gina Gershon; Thomas Haden Church
- Cinematography: Caleb Deschanel
- Edited by: Darrin Navarro
- Music by: Tyler Bates
- Production companies: Voltage Pictures; Worldview Entertainment; ANA Media
- Distributed by: LD Entertainment
- Release dates: September 8, 2011 (Venice); July 27, 2012 (United States)
- Running time: 102 minutes
- Country: United States
- Language: English
- Budget: $8.3 million
- Box office: $4.6 million

Killer Joe is a 2011 American independent Southern Gothic black comedy crime film directed by William Friedkin. The screenplay by Tracy Letts is based on his 1993 play of the same name. The film stars Matthew McConaughey in the title role, Emile Hirsch, Juno Temple, Gina Gershon, and Thomas Haden Church. It is one of the final films directed by Friedkin. (Note: He later directed the 2017 documentary film The Devil and Father Amorth and the 2023 television film The Caine Mutiny Court-Martial. The latter film was released posthumously.)

In Killer Joe, the estranged family of a woman scheme to kill her in order to collect on her life insurance policy, and conspire with a corrupt police officer to do the deed.

== Plot ==
In West Dallas, 22-year-old drug dealer Chris Smith comes to the trailer park home of his dimwitted father Ansel. Ansel lives with his wife Sharla, who has a reputation for lasciviousness. Chris's mother (and Ansel's ex-wife) Adele has thrown Chris out of her house, and stole cocaine that Chris was supposed to sell, leaving him desperate to pay the $6,000 debt he owes his supplier Digger Soames.

Chris tells Ansel that by killing Adele, they can collect on a $50,000 life insurance policy of which Chris's sister Dottie is the sole beneficiary. Chris and Ansel agree that after paying a hit man from the proceeds of the insurance policy, they will split the remainder four ways between themselves, Dottie and Sharla. Dottie approves of the plan and Chris arranges a meeting with Joe Cooper, a police detective who has a side career as a contract killer. Before the meeting, Dottie tells Joe that Adele tried to kill her once when she was an infant.

Since Chris and Ansel are broke, the plan almost falls apart when Joe demands $25,000 in advance. However, Joe is interested in Dottie, who is implied to be developmentally disabled from the murder attempt by Adele, and offers to take her as a "retainer" until the insurance money comes through. Digger has his biker henchmen beat Chris and threatens to have him killed unless he pays what he owes. Having a change of heart, Chris asks Joe to call off the hit and stop seeing Dottie, only to discover that he has already killed Adele. With the help of a reluctant Chris, Joe leaves the body in a car and sets it on fire.

After Adele's death, the family learns that the insurance beneficiary is actually Rex, Adele's boyfriend, rather than Dottie. Chris then admits he originally heard the details about the policy from Rex, who also told him about Joe, thereby duping Chris into hiring Joe to kill Adele. Ansel blames Chris for the fiasco and tells him he should just kill himself. Chris tries to persuade Dottie to run away with him to escape Digger and Joe, both of whom expect to be paid. Dottie agrees to go with Chris if she can see Joe first.

After Adele's funeral, Joe pulls Rex over in his car and Chris buys a pistol on the black market. When Ansel and Sharla return home, they find Joe inside with Dottie. He asks increasingly pointed questions of Sharla, leading her to admit that she knew the policy was really for $100,000, since accidental death doubled the payout. Joe shows them a check of that amount payable to Rex, implying he is dead, as well as offering incriminating photos that prove Sharla was having an affair with Rex. Angered, Ansel declines to protect Sharla when Joe chokes her, punches her and forces her to simulate oral sex on a fried chicken leg.

Joe knows Chris is coming to take Dottie away and threatens to kill Ansel and Sharla if they do not stop him. After Chris arrives, Joe announces that he and Dottie will be married. Chris rejects this, ordering Dottie to leave with him. Joe tells her to stay where she is, but Dottie stands up and walks away as both men yell at her. When Chris threatens Joe with his gun, Sharla stabs Chris with a steak knife and Joe tackles him. Ansel and Sharla rush to assist Joe as he beats Chris, not wanting to be killed if Chris flees with Dottie. Dottie recovers the gun and, in a rage, fires several shots, killing Chris and seriously wounding Ansel. Dottie turns the gun on Joe, telling him that she is pregnant. Joe appears overjoyed as he inches closer to Dottie. The film ends just as Dottie moves her finger back to the trigger.

== Cast ==
- Matthew McConaughey as "Killer Joe" Cooper
- Emile Hirsch as Chris Smith
- Juno Temple as Dottie Smith
- Thomas Haden Church as Ansel Smith
- Gina Gershon as Sharla Smith
- Marc Macaulay as "Digger" Soames

== Production ==
In a 2005 interview, Peter Bogdanovich revealed that he had accepted an offer to direct a film adaptation of Tracy Letts' stage play Killer Joe which he noted—along with three other projects he was developing at the time—had some degree of "personal resonance" for him. At the time, they were in the process of attaching actors so that it could then be shopped around as a package, and he said that it was likely that the film would be shot in Texas. In 2007, Bogdanovich said that production would likely begin in January the following year.

According to colleague William Friedkin, who directed the resultant film, Bogdanovich chose Jeff Bridges for the title role. "They couldn't set it up," said Friedkin. "Jeff Bridges finally withdrew, having said that his wife told him that if he did this role, she'd leave him." The part of Joe Cooper ultimately went to Matthew McConaughey, whose name guaranteed financing.

== Release ==
Killer Joe premiered at the 68th Venice International Film Festival before making its North American debut at the 2011 Toronto International Film Festival, where US distribution rights were acquired by LD Entertainment. LD Entertainment, Liddell's new theatrical distribution company headed by David Dinerstein, scheduled its release for July 2012.

The film made its Quebec premiere at the Fantasia Festival, an annual international genre film festival held in Montreal, Quebec, on July 31, 2012.

The film's UK premiere was at the Opening Gala of the Edinburgh International Film Festival on June 20, 2012, where it was introduced by Friedkin and Gershon, who later attended the after-party at the National Museum of Scotland. The film received a theatrical release in the UK on June 29. It opened in three theaters almost a month later on July 27 in the US.

Cutting would not have made it mass appeal. Cutting it would have been the equivalent of what members of the United States government and military leaders said about the Vietnam War. They said, "We have to destroy Vietnam in order to save it," and that's what I would have done to Killer Joe. To get an R rating, I would have had to destroy it in order to save it and I wasn't interested in doing that.

— William Friedkin, on why he refused to censor his film

In the US, the film received an NC-17 rating from the MPAA for "graphic disturbing content involving violence and sexuality, and a scene of brutality." After an unsuccessful appeal, LD Entertainment announced plans to release the movie uncut, with the NC-17 rating, on July 27, 2012.

On October 23, 2012, the film's NC-17 rating was surrendered. It was released in the United States on DVD and Blu-ray unedited, as an unrated director's cut.

=== Box office ===
The film was not a box office success, grossing only $1,987,762 in the domestic market and $2,645,906 internationally for a worldwide total of $4,633,668. The film was released in only 75 theaters nationwide and closed on October 14, nine days prior to the rating being surrendered.

=== Critical reception ===
On the review aggregator website Rotten Tomatoes, 80% of 173 critics' reviews are positive, with an average rating of 7/10. The website's consensus reads: "Violent, darkly comic, and full of strong performances, Killer Joe proves William Friedkin hasn't lost his touch, even if the plot may be too lurid for some." Metacritic, which uses a weighted average, assigned the film a score of 62 out of 100, based on 38 critics, indicating "generally favorable" reviews.

According to Justin Chang of Variety, "Killer Joe was Letts' first play, written more than a decade before his smash hit August: Osage County, and the text's sneer of condescension toward its panoply of trailer-trash caricatures has not entirely abated here," yet "the film doesn't belabor even its cheaper punchlines, and the fleet, kinetic visual style devised by d.p. Caleb Deschanel and editor Darrin Navarro emphasizes narrative momentum over cruel comedy. To be sure, Friedkin is clearly amused and appalled by his slovenly, foul-mouthed characters, with their off-the-charts levels of dysfunction and incompetence. But he directs them vigorously enough, pushing them past the realm of caricature to individuate themselves onscreen."

A critic in The Daily Telegraph determined that Church, Gershon, and Hirsch portray a "uniformly gormless family unit" in a film whose "positively Jacobean climax [earns] its 18 certificate and then some."

Keith Uhlich of Time Out New York named Killer Joe the fifth-best film of 2012, calling it a "thrilling black comedy."

=== Awards ===
McConaughey received a nomination for the Independent Spirit Award for Best Male Lead. The Women Film Critics Circle, however, nominated the film for its display of the worst female and male images.

- Winner Best Independent Film Saturn Awards
- Winner Best Actor Saturn Awards (Matthew McConaughey)
- Nominated Best Director Saturn Awards (William Friedkin)
- Nominated Best Supporting Actress Saturn Awards (Gina Gershon)
- Nominated Best Writing Saturn Awards (Tracey Letts)
- Winner Special Honorary Award Austin Film Critics Association (Matthew McConaughey)
- Nominated Grand Prix Belgian Film Critics Association
- Nominated Best Actor Independent Spirit Awards (Matthew McConaughey)
- Nominated Best Supporting Actor San Diego Film Critics Society (Matthew McConaughey)
- Winner Best Supporting Actress Toronto Film Critics Association (Gina Gershon)
- Winner Golden Mouse Venice International Film Festival (William Friedkin)
- Nominated Golden Lion Venice International Film Festival (William Friedkin)

== Home media ==
Killer Joe was released on DVD and Blu-ray on December 21, 2012.
