= A. J. Finn =

American author

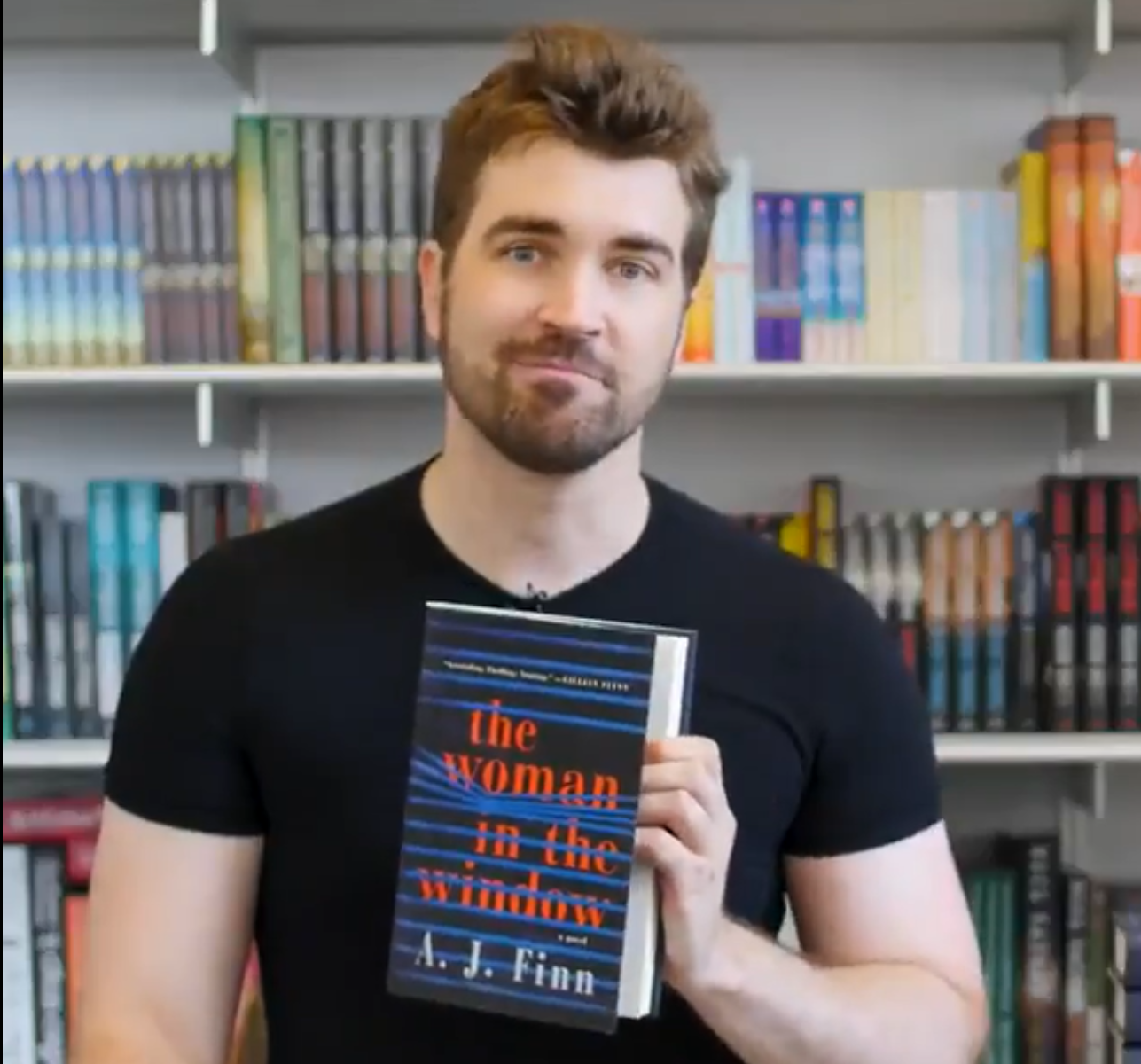
- A. J. Finn in 2019
- Born: Daniel Mallory; 1979 (age 46–47); New York City, U.S.
- Education: Duke University (BA); University of Oxford (MPhil)
- Occupation: Author
- Writing career
- Pen name: A. J. Finn
- Period: 2018–present
- Genres: Crime fiction, psychological thrillers
- Notable works: The Woman in the Window (2018); End of Story (2024)

Daniel Mallory (born 1979) is an American author who writes crime fiction under the name A. J. Finn. His 2018 novel The Woman in the Window debuted at number one on the New York Times Best Seller list. The Woman in the Window was adapted into a feature film of the same name, directed by Joe Wright and featuring Amy Adams, Julianne Moore and Gary Oldman.

In 2019, an article in The New Yorker stated that Mallory had frequently lied about his personal life and health. Mallory obliquely acknowledged being deceptive in a statement. Mallory attributed his actions to his struggles with bipolar depressive disorder, which drew criticism from psychiatrists. His second novel, End of Story, was published in February 2024.

== Early life and education ==
Mallory was born in New York City and moved with his family to Charlotte, North Carolina, where he attended Charlotte Latin School. He went on to attend Duke University, where he majored in English and acted. He studied at the University of Oxford during his junior year and returned to Oxford after college for graduate work, completing a master's degree.

== Career ==
Before becoming a novelist, Mallory worked in publishing in New York and London for several years, including at Little, Brown and Company and William Morrow and Company, a division of HarperCollins.

=== The Woman in the Window ===
Mallory wrote The Woman in the Window, his first novel, while living in New York and told The Guardian it took him exactly a year to write.

The novel debuted in January 2018 at number one on the New York Times bestseller list.The Woman in the Window follows the life of Dr. Anna Fox, who has agoraphobia and lives a reclusive life at her large home in New York City, where she one day witnesses a murder at the house across a park from hers. Janet Maslin in The New York Times said, "A book that's as devious as this novel will delight anyone who's been disappointed too often" and that it holds up "pretty well, but there are problems" with writing that "is serviceable, sometimes bordering on strange". The novel was subsequently adapted into a feature film directed by Joe Wright with a screenplay by Tracy Letts. The film was originally set for a theatrical release on May 15, 2020. However, due to the COVID-19 pandemic the film was sold to Netflix, which began streaming it on May 14, 2021.

=== End of Story ===
Finn's second novel was published by HarperCollins on February 20, 2024 (United States) and February 29, 2024 (United Kingdom). Set in San Francisco, it is a thriller about a young woman writing the biography of a celebrated crime writer.

=== Style and influences ===
A. J. Finn has cited classic film noir and suspense fiction as influences. He has shared that The Woman in the Window takes cues from Alfred Hitchcock's Rear Window (1954) and has been influenced by genre classics such as Gaslight and Gone Girl.

== Allegations of lying ==
In February 2019, an article in The New Yorker on The Woman in the Window alleged that Mallory had been "an unreliable narrator" about some of his personal biography, including falsely claiming to have had cancer and misrepresenting his academic credentials, amongst other things. For instance, the article describes a series of emails supposedly authored by Mallory's brother, describing Mallory undergoing a seven-hour spine surgery to remove a tumor and suffering severe cardiac arrest. Mallory then returned to work, largely unchanged, within several weeks. The article also describes claims that Mallory stated his brother committed suicide and his mother died of cancer; both were alive as of 2019. Mallory is described as claiming, inaccurately, to have received a doctorate from Oxford. The article also describes Mallory's false claim to have worked on Final Destination, a film released in 2000.

Mallory admitted that he had "stated, implied, or allowed others to believe that [he] was afflicted with a physical malady instead of a psychological one", saying that "like many afflicted with severe bipolar II disorder, [he] experienced crushing depressions, delusional thoughts, morbid obsessions, and memory problems." He went on to say that he "felt intensely ashamed of my psychological struggles—they were my scariest, most sensitive secret". Psychiatrists disputed his assertion that the condition causes delusions, memory loss or deceptive behavior. Mallory's psychiatrist disclosed that Mallory sometimes suffered from "somatic complaints, fears, and preoccupations" due to his bipolar depression.

In response to his explanation, The Guardian wrote "His account would not explain instances where he inflated his professional experience to smooth his rapid advance up the ranks of publishing" and "that Mallory was helped to rise with such speed, on the back of unchecked claims about his experience and competence, is not only depressing for those working honestly in the industry, but also deeply infuriating".

Author Karin Slaughter, who worked with Mallory at William Morrow, noted that "he was extremely professional and he was really one of the best advocates I could have had. He wrote fantastic copy, he was great with jacketing. He really understood the business" and said The New Yorker article "felt like a hit piece".

== Allegations ==
In 2019, The New York Times investigated plagiarism rumors due to what it described as "numerous, and detailed" plot similarities and "nearly identical plot twists in the final act" between The Woman in the Window and another psychological thriller, Sarah A. Denzil's Saving April.

Saving April was released in March 2016 and The Woman in the Window was released in January 2018.

Five days after the article's publication, The Times revised their story with exonerating information. They reviewed outlines of The Woman in the Window, and stated that crucial "plot points were all included in outlines for The Woman in the Window that Mr. Mallory sent to Jennifer Joel, a literary agent at ICM, in the fall of 2015, before Ms Denzil began writing Saving April." The story also quoted Harvard Law School's intellectual property expert Rebecca Tushnet who explained that there are many "well-worn tropes in thrillers," and Stuart Karle of Columbia Journalism School who stated that "great fiction builds on prior works in terms of both language and sense of place."

In response to the new information, Publisher's Lunch contacted Denzil and she confirmed that "March 2016 would have been the earliest point that anyone, aside from me, the Kindle Press team and the copy editor at Kindle Press, would have read the book in its entirety." As a result, "Mallory is said to have felt the NYT was negligent in investigating the veracity of the claims. This person said the NYT was persuaded to see the error of their ways and update the story."

In addition, the director of 1995 film Copycat, Jon Amiel, also noted similarities between The Woman in the Window and his own movie. He told The New Yorker this was "not actionable, but certainly worth noting", adding: "One would have hoped that the author might have noted it himself".

== Personal life ==
Mallory is openly gay. He dedicated his first novel to his then-boyfriend, George.

== Bibliography ==
- —— (2018). The Woman in the Window (1st ed.). New York: William Morrow and Company. ISBN 9780062678416.
- —— (2024). End of Story (1st ed.). New York: William Morrow and Company. ISBN 9780062678454.
