= Killer Joe (play) =

1993 play by Tracy Letts

- Written by: Tracy Letts
- Characters: Chris Smith (22 years old); Sharla Smith (early 30s); Ansel Smith (38 years old); Dottie Smith (20 years old); Killer Joe Cooper (mid-thirties)
- Original language: English
- Genre: Black comedy, thriller, in-yer-face theatre
- Setting: A trailer home on the outskirts of Dallas, Texas

Premiere
- Date premiered: August 3, 1993
- Place premiered: Next Theatre Lab, Evanston, Illinois

Killer Joe is a play written by Tracy Letts in 1993.

== Productions ==
The play was produced then premiered in 1993 at the Next Theatre Lab, in Evanston, Illinois, directed by Wilson Milam. After a successful run, Killer Joe was transferred to the Traverse Theatre at the Edinburgh Fringe Festival. The play gained positive reviews, and received the Fringe First award, given to new productions at the festival. The play then made its New York premiere Off-Off-Broadway by 29th Street Repertory in 1994.

Killer Joe transferred to London on 16 January 1995 at the Bush Theatre. The limited run at the Bush Theatre was a sell out, and once again received rave reviews. After closing at the Bush Theatre, Killer Joe opened at the Vaudeville Theatre, London, for one year.

Killer Joe was revived Off-Broadway at the Soho Playhouse in October 1998 until 13 June 1999, starring Scott Glenn, Amanda Plummer and Michael Shannon.

In 2018, Killer Joe opened at the Trafalgar Studio, London, starring Orlando Bloom, Sophie Cookson, Adam Gillen, Steffan Rhodri and Neve McIntosh. This production was directed by Simon Evans. Previews began on May 18, with the official opening on June 4. The production closed on August 18, 2018. Adam Gillen was nominated for a 2019 Laurence Olivier Award for Best Actor In a Supporting Role for his role in the production.

== Synopsis ==
Killer Joe is set in a trailer park in Mesquite, Texas, outside Dallas. Police detective Joe Cooper is also a hit man. He is hired to kill the mother of a young drug dealer, Chris, with Chris's father Ansel as an accomplice. However, Chris and Ansel cannot afford to pay Joe in advance, so Joe accepts Chris' innocent sister Dottie as a form of payment until the debts can be paid.

== Adaptation ==
Letts adapted the dark comedy into the film Killer Joe in 2011.
