= Darryl De Sousa =

Commissioner of the Baltimore Police Department in 2018

Commissioner of the Baltimore Police Department
- In office January 19, 2018 – May 15, 2018 (Note: Acting until February 28, 2018; suspended from May 11, 2018)
- Preceded by: Kevin Davis
- Succeeded by: Gary Tuggle (acting)

Personal details
- Born: Darryl D. De Sousa; 1964 or 1965 (age 61–62) New York City, U.S.
- Children: 2
- Education: Morgan State University (BA)
- Police career
- Department: Baltimore Police Department
- Service years: 1988–2018

Darryl D. De Sousa (born 1964 or 1965) is an American former police officer who served as commissioner of the Baltimore Police Department from January to May 2018. Having served the BPD since 1988, he resigned as commissioner after he was indicted for three counts of tax evasion. After pleading guilty in December 2018, he was sentenced to 10 months in prison and ordered to pay restitution.

Born in New York City, De Sousa joined the Baltimore Police Department (BPD) in 1988. He received a Bachelor of Arts from Morgan State University in 1997, having deferred completing his degree to join the BPD. In 1995, he was involved in two fatal shootings; while he was found not liable in both cases, they resurfaced once he became commissioner. He held many positions within the department, and was serving as deputy commissioner of the Patrol Bureau when he was appointed as acting commissioner in January 2018 to replace Kevin Davis amid rising crime rates. After his appointment, he vowed to reduce violence and re-introduced hot-spot policing. In February, he changed the management of the BPD, promoting the first African-American woman above major in over 30 years, and introducing several new units, including one to give polygraph tests to special units after the Gun Trace Task Force (GTTF) scandal. He was confirmed as commissioner by the Baltimore City Council on February 26, 2018, with only one member opposing, and he was sworn in two days later. As commissioner, homicides reduced under De Sousa, despite an upward trend towards the end of his tenure.

De Sousa was indicted on May 6, 2018, for three misdemeanor counts of failing to file a tax return, in 2013, 2014, and 2015. The indictment was unsealed on May 10, after which he admitted to the crimes in a Tweet, saying that he "failed to sufficiently prioritize [his] personal affairs". While mayor Catherine Pugh initially supported De Sousa, the Baltimore Fraternal Order of Police called for his resignation. Pugh placed De Sousa on paid suspension on May 11 while Gary Tuggle served as acting commissioner; De Sousa resigned on May 15. He was re-arraigned on December 18, where he pleaded guilty, also admitting to a series of tax infractions starting in 1999. Investigators discovered that the GTTF had given De Sousa tips on avoiding taxes, which his attorney countered by saying that he was unaware their tips were illegal. Despite petitions from his friends and family, he was sentenced to 10 months in prison, one year of supervised release, 100 hours of community service, and ordered to pay restitution on March 29, 2019. He was held in the Federal Correctional Institution, Fairton, New Jersey, from May 13 to February 14, 2020, when he was moved to a halfway house; he was planned to be released on March 11, but said he was released on November 11.

== Biography ==
Darryl D. De Sousa was born in 1964 or 1965 in New York City. He had a twin brother. He moved from Jamaica, Queens, to Baltimore in 1983. Initially attending Virginia State University, he transferred to Morgan State University but deferred completing his degree to join the BPD; he graduated with a Bachelor of Arts in 1997. When he was appointed commissioner, De Sousa lived in downtown Baltimore and had two children.

== Career ==
=== Early career (1988–2018) ===
De Sousa joined the BPD in 1988. He said he was drawn to law enforcement after attending school in a racist area of Jamaica and only seeing white New York Police Department officers. His twin brother was supportive of him becoming a police officer. According to De Sousa, he wanted to achieve the rank of lieutenant when he first joined the department, inspired by Owen E. Sweeney, a lieutenant he knew that was killed on duty on May 8, 1997. Once he reached lieutenant, he vowed to "keep going". He served as deputy commissioner of the Patrol Bureau when he was appointed commissioner, previously holding positions including deputy commissioner of the Administrative Bureau, chief of patrol, an area commander, a district commander, and a district executive officer. As commander of the Northeast District, De Sousa claimed "we drove violence down to a point where it was probably the highest reduction in over a decade". Outside the BPD, he was a trustee of the Baltimore Fire and Police Employee's Retirement System, a board member of the F.L. Templeton Preparatory Academy, a ranking member of the Fraternal Order of Police, and a member of the National Organization for Black Law Enforcement Professionals.

In 1995, De Sousa was involved in two fatal shootings: one killing Garrett "Scooter" Jackson, a 26-year-old, in February; and the other, in December, killing George Thomas Jr., a 38-year-old fugitive; and Melvin James, an 18-year-old bystander. Before Jackson's killing, De Sousa said that while he was investigating Jackson "acting in a suspicious manner", Jackson pointed a pistol at De Sousa, and De Sousa shot Jackson in self-defense. Witnesses of the shooting said that Jackson did not pull out a gun. After Jackson's death, a vigil was held, protests formed at BPD headquarters, and an open letter accused the BPD of "running wild, accountable to no one". Jackson's brother Reginald sued De Sousa for US$500,000 ($1.06 million in 2025), claiming that De Sousa firing 18 rounds at Garrett, continuing after he collapsed, was beyond reasonable self-defense and violated BPD policies on the use of force. Robert C. Verderaime, De Sousa's lawyer, said that the shooting "was based solely on [De Sousa's] protection of himself and others from imminent serious injury or death". A jury cleared De Sousa of wrongdoing.

In the killing of Thomas and James, De Sousa claimed Thomas ran at De Sousa and two of his colleagues, Willis Richardson and Kevin Ruth, and began firing a pistol at them. The officers took cover and returned fire, killing Thomas, and a bullet ricocheted off a building, killing James. A bystander said that De Sousa endangered many people on the street. James's mother Doris and Tracey Day sued De Sousa, Richardson, and Ruth for US$1 million ($2.11 million in 2025), accusing them of firing shots "in a wild and uncontrolled manner; without stopping", and saying that only one of 30 shots hit Thomas, while one hit James, who was half a block away. Verderaime said that Thomas shouted profanities at the officers and opened fire, causing the officers to return fire in good faith. The case was dismissed.

=== Acting commissioner (January–February 2018) ===
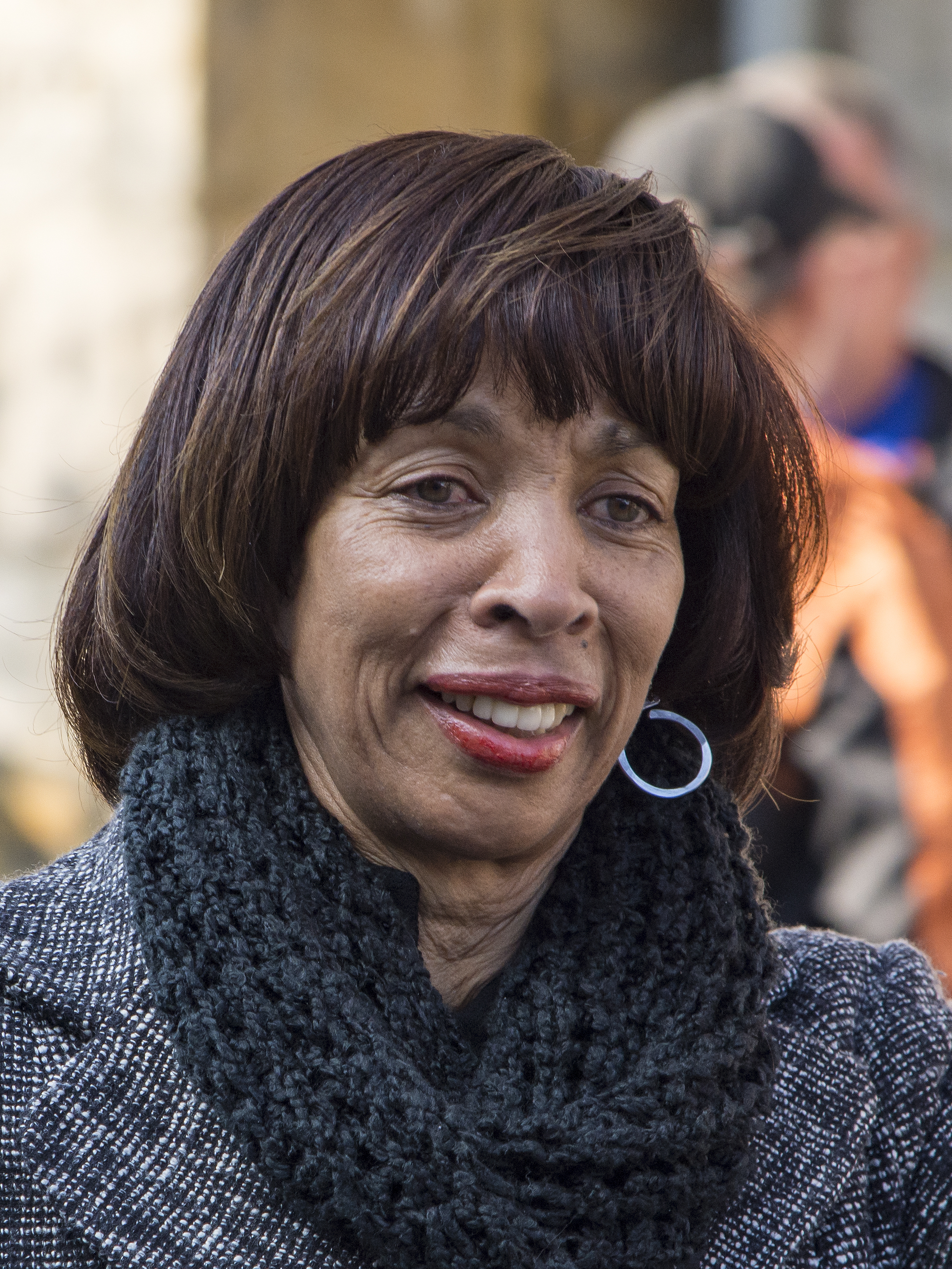
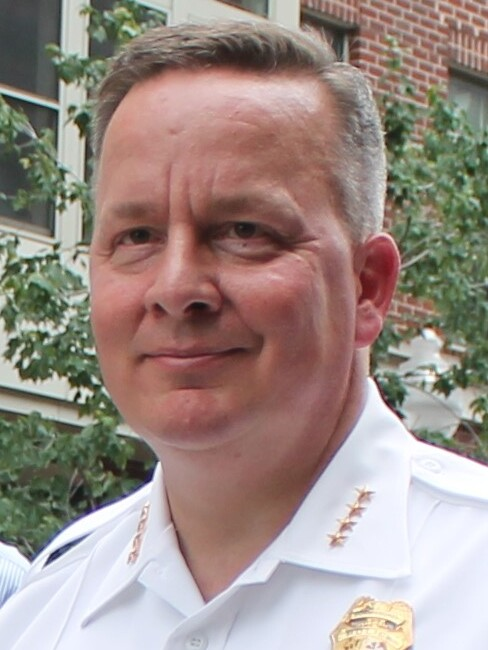
Mayor Catherine Pugh appointed De Sousa to replace Kevin Davis.

On January 19, 2018, mayor Catherine Pugh announced the firing of commissioner Kevin Davis and the appointment of De Sousa as acting commissioner, saying that "we are not achieving the pace of progress that our residents have every right to expect in the weeks since we ended what was nearly a record year for homicides in the City of Baltimore", citing a record 343 homicides in 2017. City councilman Brandon Scott, city council president Jack Young, and state's attorney Marilyn Mosby endorsed Davis's replacement. Richard Hite, a chief of the Indianapolis Police Department who earlier served the BPD, described De Sousa as having "boundless energy". City councilman Kristerfer Burnett believed that De Sousa being African American would improve the morale of African American officers. Tyrone Powers, director of the Homeland Security and Criminal Justice Institute of Anne Arundel Community College, said that while De Sousa "has the talent and the integrity", he would have to manage a damaged department in the aftermath of the Gun Trace Task Force (GTTF) scandal. In an article on the Baltimore Fishbowl – a news website – Ethan McLeod compared Davis's replacement with the firing of Anthony Batts by Stephanie Rawlings-Blake in 2012, as both happened amid increasing crime and unrest.

After being appointed commissioner, De Sousa said that his "priority as of this moment right now is really simple – it's a really simple priority, and that's violence reduction. Second priority is violence reduction, and third priority is violence reduction at an accelerated pace. That's the bottom line." He also planned to send more officers to the streets during the day and increase patrolling of communities. Maryland state delegate Nick Mosby criticized De Sousa's plan, saying that while De Sousa being from Baltimore may help improve relations between the police and the community, major change was impossible without economic opportunities for city residents and more officers would not improve crime. Police union president Gene Ryan supported De Sousa's plan, stating "If you're not familiar with what's going on there, how can you solve the problems? We need boots on the ground. We've got to regain their trust. We need to get back to a relationship where we are all family again."

De Sousa also said he would re-introduce hot-spot policing, targeting high-crime neighborhoods with specialized officers. While hot-spot policing was previously successful in Baltimore, it forced the city to pay settlements with people who claimed the BPD violated their civil rights. After consulting with the United States Department of Justice, who had been monitoring the BPD since 2015, Pugh hired Sean Malinowski, a Los Angeles Police Department commander who develops predictive policing programs, to advise the department. De Sousa said "I have a real strong message for the trigger pullers: it's that we're coming after them", while vowing to target them "in a constitutional manner". After De Sousa was appointed commissioner, the killings of Jackson, Thomas, and James resurfaced. Pugh said that she "completely vetted" them and they did not affect her decision, while Scott said he had no concerns about the incidents, claiming De Sousa was unfairly criticized relative to Davis because he was African American. Young called the killings "justifiable shootings in the line of duty".

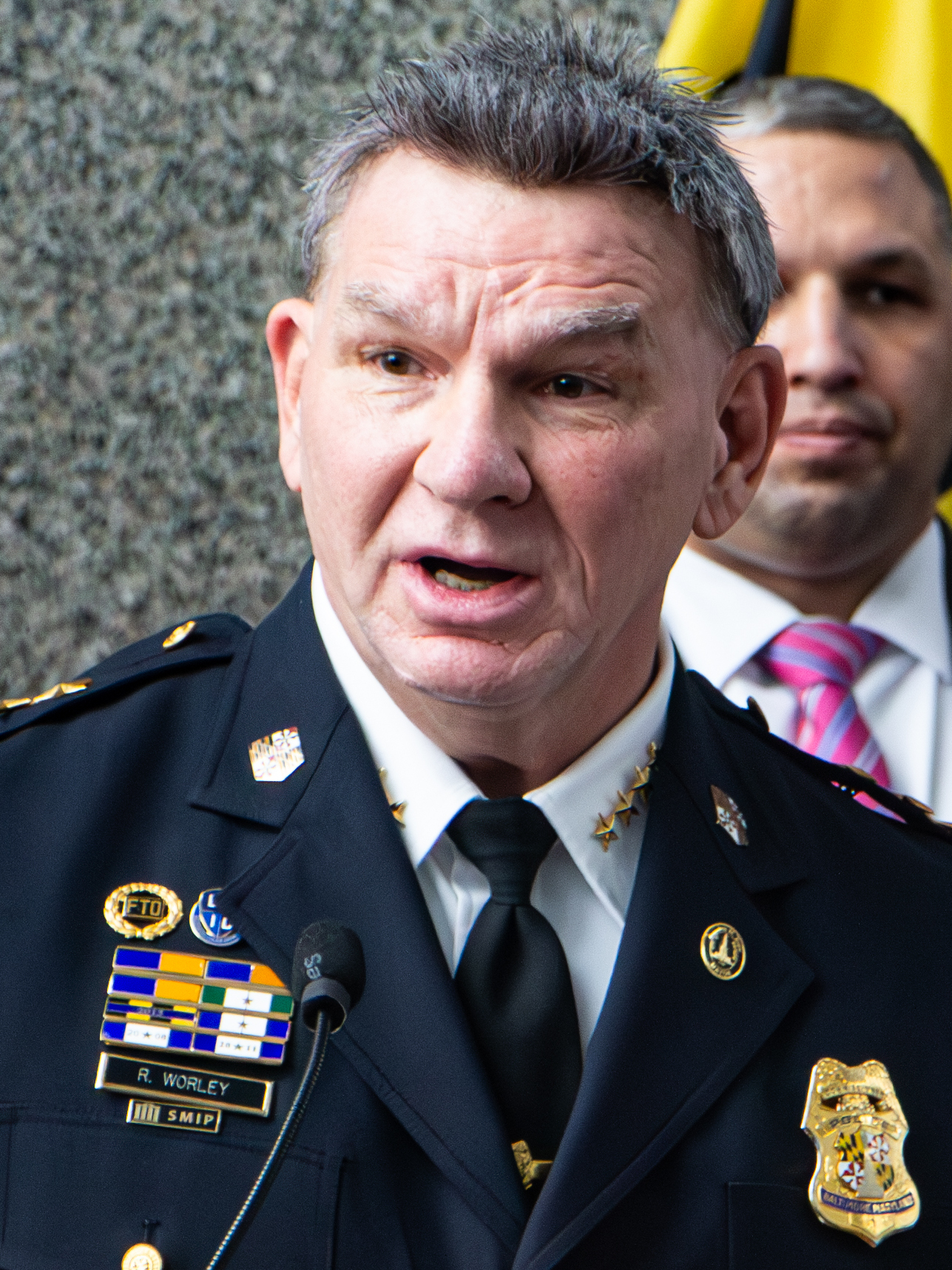
Future commissioner Richard Worley led De Sousa's anti-corruption unit.

On February 9, 2018, De Sousa announced changes to the management of the BPD. He promoted LaTonya Lewis to a lieutenant colonel managing the homeland security division, making her the first African American woman to serve above the rank of major in over 30 years. He also created an inspectional services and integrity division, led by Osborne Robinson, to give random polygraph tests to special unit members in the aftermath of the GTTF scandal. An inspector general position and an anti-corruption unit, which was led by future commissioner Richard Worley, were also introduced. A fiscal manager position was created to prevent inappropriate overtime. While he appointed Thomas Casella (Note: Also spelled "Cassella") as a deputy commissioner, (Note: While WYPR reported that Casella was nominated for deputy commissioner of the Operations Bureau, WEAA reported Casella was nominated as deputy commissioner of the Strategic Investigations & Support Services Bureau and Andre Bonaparte was nominated as deputy commissioner of the Operations Bureau. The Baltimore Fishbowl also said Tuggle was deputy commissioner of the Strategic Investigations & Support Services Bureau when he became acting commissioner.) his appointment was suspended when documents showing two complaints against Casella were leaked. De Sousa denied claims that Alicia White, who was acquitted in the killing of Freddie Gray, was promoted to the internal affairs division. De Sousa later said the complaints against Casella were invalid:

The information contained in the personnel memo leaked to the news media last week in reference to Thomas Casella was incorrect. There are no sustained complaints against him involving race, religion, sex, or any other type of discrimination. What occurred to him was completely unfortunate and unfair. We are investigating how incorrect information was provided to me and how that information was publicly disseminated.

Despite De Sousa declaring the complaints invalid, he said on February 13 that he and Casella agreed to not follow through with the promotion and that he would announce a new deputy commissioner soon. On March 2, he announced that he had picked former Drug Enforcement Administration agent and future acting commissioner of the BPD Gary Tuggle to serve as a deputy commissioner.

On February 13, 2018, the two GTTF members who did not plead guilty, Daniel Hersl and Marcus Taylor, were found guilty of racketeering. After the verdict, De Sousa said that "our job moving forward is to earn back the trust and respect of the community" and vowed to "[root] out anyone who thinks they can tarnish the badge and violate our citizen's rights". Alongside the inspectional services and integrity division, De Sousa announced that he was considering moving the internal affairs department from the BPD to the mayor's office to improve public perception after the scandal.

=== Permanent commissioner (February–May 2018) ===
On February 21, 2018, after nearly four hours of testimony, the Baltimore City Council executive appointments committee unanimously approved De Sousa's nomination as commissioner. On February 26, the full council voted to confirm De Sousa as commissioner, with the only dissenting vote being from Ryan Dorsey, who said he was unsatisfied with De Sousa's answers to his questions. During the council vote, councilman Zeke Cohen said that the council had "very high expectations for this commissioner", saying he needed to control overtime and fight violence constitutionally, while Brandon Scott vowed to hold De Sousa accountable. Pugh said she was "extremely pleased" at the confirmation of De Sousa. On February 28, De Sousa was sworn in as commissioner, and the Baltimore board of estimates unanimously approved a four-year contract paying De Sousa US$210,000 ($269,249 in 2025) annually and US$150,000 ($192,320 in 2025) if he is fired without cause, similar to the ones Davis and Batts received. At his swearing-in, De Sousa vowed to "not let this city down" and said "We have to redefine the culture in the Baltimore Police Department. It has to be a culture of accountability."

On April 12, a jury acquitted Malik Thompson, who De Sousa arrested in May 2017, of gun charges. According to De Sousa, he found a loaded gun in the glovebox of a car after Thompson fled from the passenger seat during a traffic stop. Ilene Frame, Thompson's public defender, criticized De Sousa's arrest as "sloppy", saying he failed to take a photo of the gun when he found it or activate his body camera. The BPD said they respected the ruling and the Baltimore Fraternal Order of Police supported it. On April 25, at a public meeting with Pugh, De Sousa announced the return of the BPD's "Officer Friendly" program, requiring officers to perform volunteer work in communities. The program was removed when the BPD shifted towards zero tolerance, but De Sousa reinstated it to increase community trust. The crowd applauded the announcement.

== Tax evasion and resignation ==
Darryl De Sousa
(@Darryl_De_Sousa)
tweeted:

I fully admit to failing to file my personal Federal and State taxes for 2013, 2014 and 2015. I did file my 2016 taxes and received an extension for my 2017 taxes. I have been working to satisfy the filing requirements and, to that end, have been working with a registered tax advisor.

To be clear, I have paid Federal, state and local taxes regularly through the salary withholding process.

While there is no excuse for my failure to fulfil my obligations as a citizen and public official, my only explanation is that I failed to sufficiently prioritize my personal affairs. Naturally, this is a source of embarrassment for me and I deeply regret any embarrassment it has caused the Police Department and the City of Baltimore. I accept full responsibility for this mistake and am committed to resolving this situation as quickly as possible.

May 10, 2018

On May 6, 2018, De Sousa was charged with three misdemeanor counts for willingly failing to file a federal tax return. The case was unsealed on May 10, revealing that De Sousa failed to pay taxes in 2013, 2014, and 2015, while being an employee of the BPD. He faced up to three years in prison and a US$75,000 fine. Federal prosecutors also announced that he was being investigated for further federal crimes. De Sousa admitted to failing to pay taxes in a Tweet the same day, saying that he "failed to sufficiently prioritize [his] personal affairs". He also said that he paid taxes through withholding, filed his taxes in 2016, received an extension for 2017, and was working with a tax advisor. While Pugh said she still had "full confidence" in De Sousa and did not ask him to resign, the Baltimore Fraternal Order of Police said "we feel very strongly that it is in the interest of the Baltimore Police Department to ask that Commissioner De Sousa relieve himself of his duties".

External documents
- De Sousa's plea deal

Despite initially supporting De Sousa, Pugh announced that she placed him on paid suspension on May 11 "upon review of the circumstances" of De Sousa's tax evasion, saying that the city had "learned a few lessons" on commissioner vetting. Pugh praised De Sousa's tenure, crediting him with reducing homicides relative to the same period in 2017, despite a slight increase towards the end of his tenure. Tuggle succeeded De Sousa as acting commissioner. Pugh's appointment of De Sousa was compared to that of Pugh's spokesman Darryl Strange as an example of bad vetting by her administration; Strange resigned after less than a day when The Baltimore Sun found he had been involved in three lawsuits as a BPD officer.

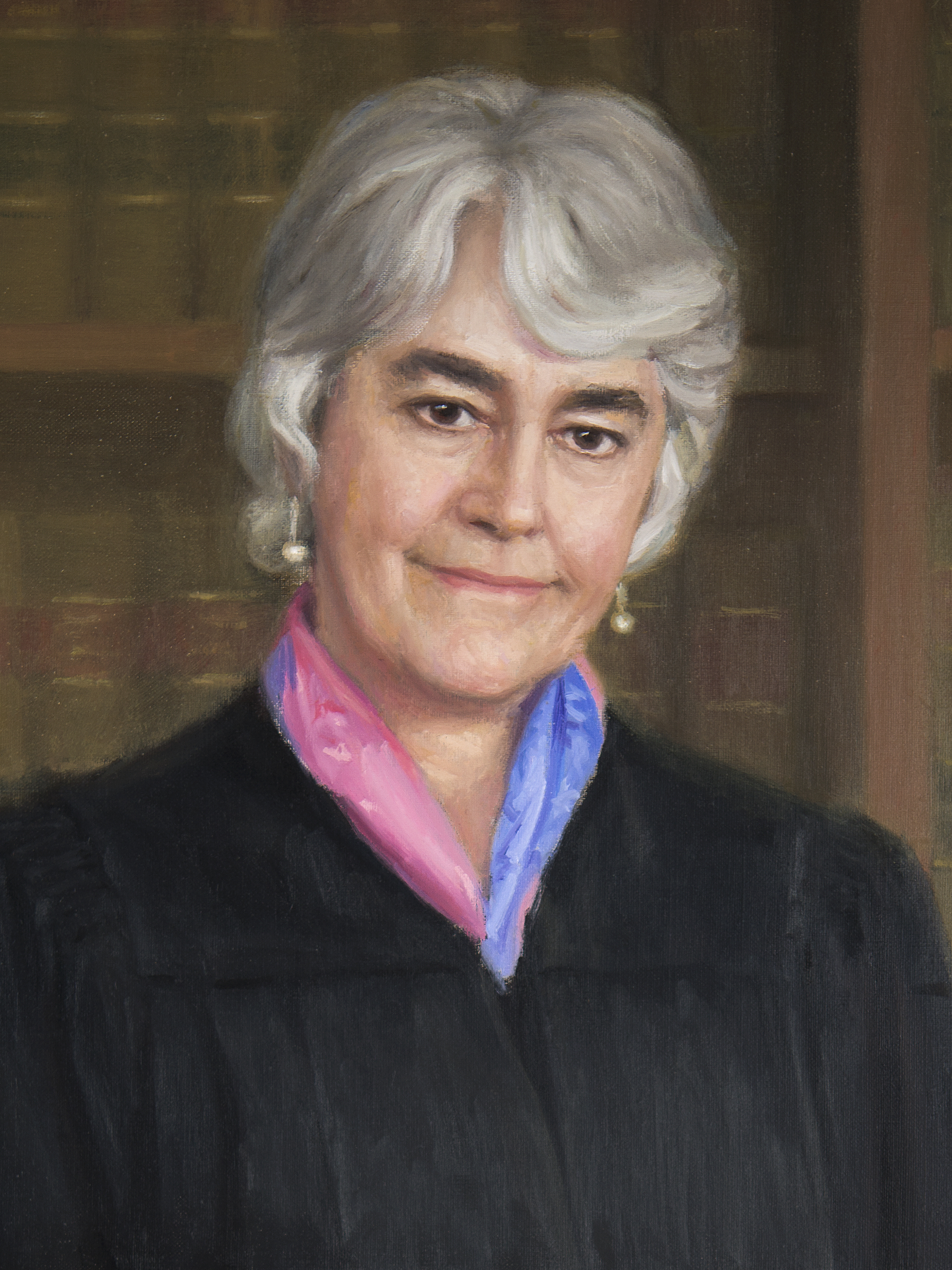
Catherine C. Blake sentenced De Sousa to 10 months in prison, one year of supervised release, and 100 hours of community service.

On May 15, De Sousa resigned, making him the third BPD commissioner to be fired or resign in three years. Tuggle continued to serve as acting commissioner, as he did when De Sousa was suspended. After his resignation, Pugh launched a search for the next permanent commissioner and vowed "this development in no way alters our strategic efforts to reduce crime by addressing its root causes in our most neglected neighborhoods". The BPD also said that De Sousa resigned from the department, having served long enough to retire. De Sousa's 116-day tenure was the second-shortest of a commissioner of the BPD, behind Ronald L. Daniel, who served 88 days from January to March 2000.

At a re-arraignment on December 18, De Sousa pleaded guilty, and his plea deal revealed a history of tax issues since 1999: De Sousa improperly claimed nine allowances in June 1999, falsely claimed donations to charity from 2008 to 2011, and claimed deductions for mortgages and business losses when he did not have a mortgage or own a business from 2008 to 2012. The Internal Revenue Service sent a lock in letter to De Sousa and the BPD in 2015, preventing the BPD from reducing De Sousa's withholdings without approval. His sentencing was scheduled for March 29, 2019.

On March 18, 2019, 11 days before De Sousa's sentencing, prosecutors connected De Sousa's tax evasion to the GTTF, saying that its officers had given De Sousa tips on receiving inappropriate tax refunds. Gerard Martin, De Sousa's attorney, responded that while De Sousa received tips from the GTTF, he did not understand that the tips were illegal. During the sentencing procedure, De Sousa's friend Darren Sanders and his sister Denise asked U.S. District Judge Catherine C. Blake for leniency, with Denise describing growing up with Darryl in New York City. Sanders described De Sousa as having "impeccable character". Despite Sanders and Denise's petitions, Blake sentenced De Sousa to 10 months in prison, one year of supervised release, 100 hours of community service, and ordered him to pay US$60,645.10 (Note: De Sousa's initial restitution was US$67,587.72; he had already paid US$6,942.62 before his sentencing.) in restitution. Blake described the sentencing as a "sad day" for De Sousa and Baltimore, saying she sentenced De Sousa to prison to discourage other officers from evading taxes. At the sentencing, U.S. Attorney Robert Hur said that De Sousa's "failure to file was a crime – not an oversight", and that "corrupt public employees rip off the taxpayers and undermine everyone's faith in government". De Sousa was expected to begin his sentence within six weeks.

De Sousa turned himself into the Federal Correctional Institution, Fairton, New Jersey, on May 13. He was set to be released on March 11, 2020. On February 14, 2020, De Sousa was moved to a halfway house, where he was placed under a curfew and required to attend programs for inmates.

== Release from prison and later life ==
Baltimore city, I apologize for letting you down. I wish I would have stayed on the job. And I probably would have stayed on the job. As long as air was in my lungs, still my lungs, but I apologize for letting y'all down.

— De Sousa during an interview with WJZ-TV, 2021

De Sousa said that he was released on November 11, 2020. He gave his first post-release interview to WEAA on June 14, 2021. During the interview, he described the indictment as a "big storm", and said he took the "posture of an eagle", owing to his mistakes and "weather[ing] the storm", as opposed to being "an ostrich burying its head in the sand" and ignoring the indictment, hoping it would pass. He reported spending the beginning of his sentence self-reflecting, believing that his sentence would be a "waste" if he did not.

In a July interview with WJZ-TV, De Sousa expressed regret for his evasion, saying that he "felt like I just left a lot on the table" both as commissioner and with Baltimore. While he said that he wished to become a police officer again, he acknowledged that he would not and vowed to advocate for safety in his community in other ways. He claimed to have started working on a documentary and mobile app, although he declined to give further details.

On America's Newsroom in August 2023, De Sousa criticized the rejected plea deal between prosecutors and Hunter Biden during the Weiss special counsel investigation, where Biden only received probation for tax evasion. He believed that the deal was politically motivated and highlighted a double standard at the U.S. Department of Justice, saying that "everyone should be held accountable across the board".

== Notes ==
Police appointments
| Preceded by Kevin Davis | Commissioner of the Baltimore Police Department; 2018 | Succeeded by Gary Tuggle (acting) |
