= Kevin Davis (police officer) =

American police officer (born 1968 or 1969)

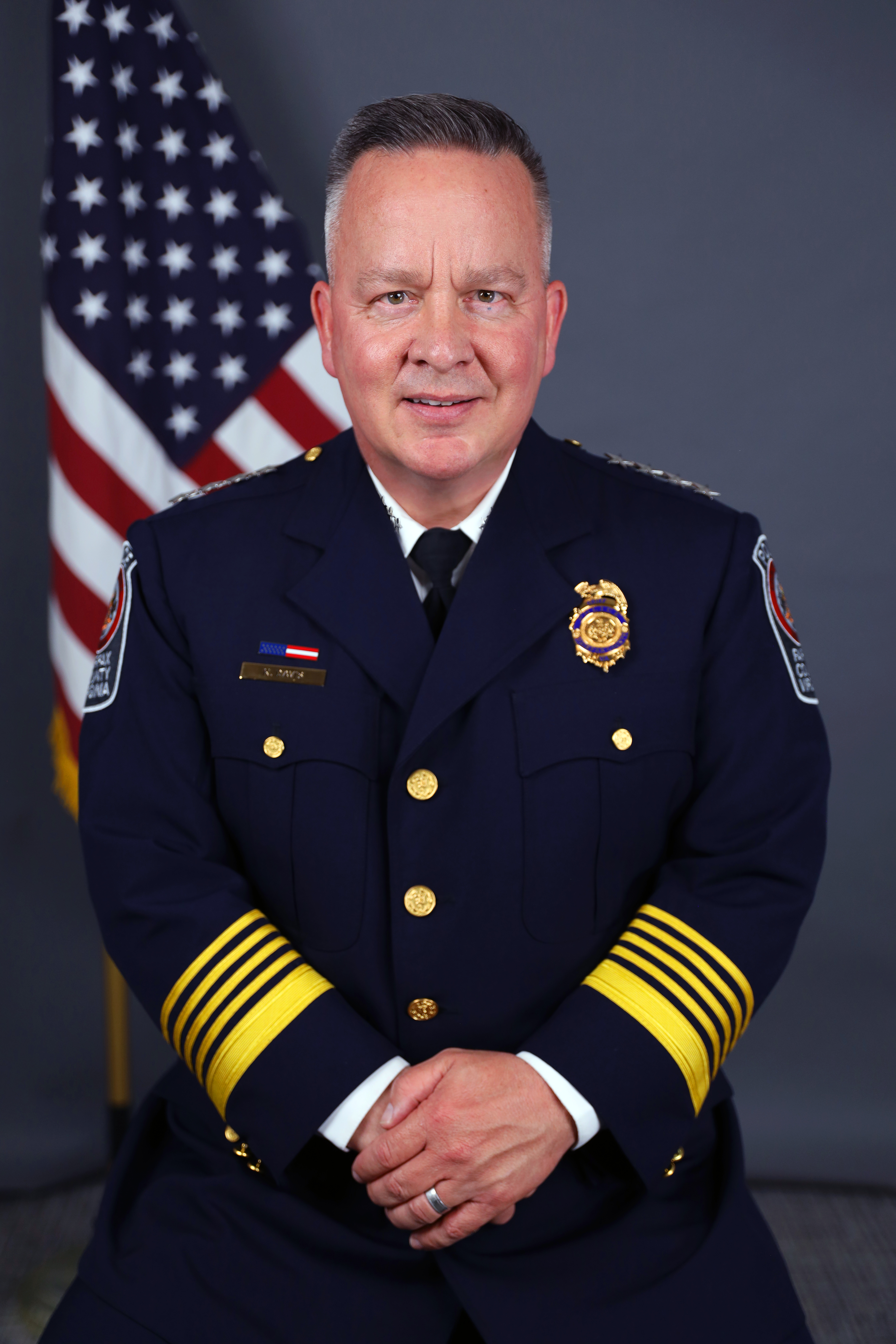
- Davis in 2024

Police Chief of the Fairfax County Police Department
- Incumbent
- Assumed office May 3, 2021

Commissioner of the Baltimore Police Department
- In office July 8, 2015 – January 19, 2018
- Preceded by: Anthony Batts
- Succeeded by: Darryl D. De Sousa

Police Chief of the Anne Arundel County Police Department
- In office July 12, 2013 – December 1, 2014

Assistant Police Chief of the Prince George's County Police Department
- In office 2009–2012

Personal details
- Born: 1969 (age 56–57) College Park, Maryland
- Children: 4
- Education: Towson University; Johns Hopkins University
- Police career
- Department: Prince George's County Police Department; Anne Arundel County Police Department; Baltimore Police Department; Fairfax County Police Department
- Service years: 1992–present

Kevin Davis is an American police officer and the 11th Police Chief of the Fairfax County Police Department, Virginia. He retired from the Prince George's County Police Department as the department's Assistant Police Chief before serving as the chief of the Anne Arundel County Police Department and the 39th Police Commissioner of the Baltimore Police Department.

== Early life ==
Davis was born 1969 at the Naval Medical Center in Bethesda, Maryland (now known as Walter Reed National Military Medical Center), and was raised in College Park, Maryland. His grandfather and great-grandfather served as high-ranked firefighters of the District of Columbia Fire and Emergency Medical Services Department, and his father retired from the Prince George's County Police Department as a police officer.

Davis attended DeMatha Catholic High School in Hyattsville, Maryland, where he is recognized as one of the school's nineteen distinguished alumni. In 1986, he was a member of DeMatha's undefeated varsity football team, which finished the season ranked #1 by The Washington Post and #6 nationally by USA Today. He earned a bachelor's degree in English from Towson University and a master's degree in Management from Johns Hopkins University. Davis is also a graduate of the Federal Bureau of Investigation's National Academy and the FBI National Executive Institute.

== Police career ==
Davis currently serves as the 11th Police Chief for the Fairfax County Police Department, Virginia’s largest local police agency and the nation’s 33rd largest.

Davis began his career with the Prince George's County Police Department in 1992, where his first assignment was at the Oxon Hill District Station. During his career with the department, he served as a member of the Emergency Services Team (SWAT), worked as a detective assigned to the Street and Narcotics Team, and later commanded the District 1 (Hyattsville) station. He rose through the ranks before being promoted to Assistant Chief in 2009, retiring from the department after nearly two decades of service.

Davis was appointed Chief of the Anne Arundel County Police Department in 2013, serving until 2014. In January 2015, he was appointed as Deputy Commissioner of the Baltimore Police Department under Commissioner Anthony Batts and served until January 20, 2018.

In July 2015, Davis was appointed as the 39th Police Commissioner of the Baltimore Police Department, following a period of historic unrest and during the Department of Justice’s civil rights investigation. During his time of service, he negotiated and implemented the federal court-ordered consent decree between the Baltimore Police Department and Department of Justice during a presidential transition. Davis described serving as Baltimore Police Commissioner as the "honor of his lifetime". He served as Commissioner until January 2018.

On May 3, 2021, Davis was appointed Chief of the Fairfax County Police Department.

As Chief, Davis has overseen initiatives focused on innovation, transparency, and public safety, including the continued expansion of the department's Real Time Crime Center (RTCC) and the deployment of the Department’s Drones as First Responder (DFR) program to enhance emergency response and officer safety, recognized by the National Association of Counties (NACo) with a 2026 Achievement Award and selected as Best in Category for Criminal Justice and Public Safety. During his tenure, the Fairfax County Police Department's Public Affairs Bureau has also received a Capital Emmy Award for their Public Affairs Program: Santa's Ride: No Child Alone This Holiday.

Davis has extensive experience leading agencies through high-profile incidents and organizational change. In 2024, he partnered with the Embassy of France and the French National Police to send Fairfax County police officers to assist with security operations during the Paris Olympic Games, one of only four U.S. law enforcement agencies selected to participate.

== Public engagement ==
Davis lectures on leadership, policing, crisis management, and public safety at American University, The Catholic University of America, and through programs hosted by the National Policing Institute.

His leadership has also been featured in several documentary productions, including the HBO documentaries Baltimore Rising (2017) and The Slow Hustle (2021), as well as the HBO miniseries We Own This City (2022), which depicts events surrounding the Baltimore Police Department during his time as commissioner.

== Personal life ==
Davis is married and has four adult children.

== Awards and honors ==
- Recognized as one of The 50 Most Influential People by the Northern Virginia Magazine in 2024 and 2025
- Recognized by the Maryland Daily Record as an Influential Marylander
- Received the Woodrow Wilson Award for Distinguished Government Service from the Johns Hopkins University Alumni Association
- Recognized as one of DeMatha Catholic High School's Distinguished Alumnus
- Awarded the Key to the City of College Park, becoming one of only four recipients in the city's history.
- Serves on the Board of Directors of the National Policing Institute.
- Serves on the Advisory Board of the University of Virginia Center of Public Safety and Justice.

Police appointments
Preceded by Anthony Batts	Commissioner of the Baltimore Police Department	Succeeded by Darryl D. De Sousa
