= Frederick H. Bealefeld III =

Commissioner of the Baltimore Police Department from 2007 to 2012

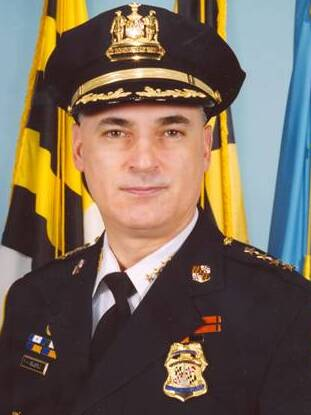
- Police portrait of Bealefeld

Commissioner of the Baltimore Police Department
- In office July 19, 2007^{[a]} – August 1, 2012
- Preceded by: Leonard Hamm
- Succeeded by: Anthony Batts

Deputy Commissioner of Operations of the Baltimore Police Department
- In office February 9, 2007 – July 19, 2007
- Commissioner: Leonard Hamm
- Preceded by: Marcus Brown
- Succeeded by: Vacant; Anthony E. Barksdale (October)

Personal details
- Born: August 1962 (age 63)
- Spouse: Linda (m. 1982 or 1983)
- Children: 2
- Education: Chesapeake High School; Anne Arundel Community College (dropped out)
- Police career
- Department: Baltimore Police Department
- Service years: 1981–2012
- Rank: Sergeant; Lieutenant; Major; Lieutenant colonel; Colonel
- a. Acting until November 19, 2007

Frederick H. Bealefeld III (/biːlfɛld/ BEEL-feld; born August 1962) is an American former police officer who served as commissioner of the Baltimore Police Department from 2007 to 2012. He also served as deputy commissioner of operations for the department from January to July 2007. Born to a family of police officers, Bealefeld graduated from Chesapeake High School in Anne Arundel County, and attended Anne Arundel Community College, dropping out due to an injury preventing him from obtaining a lacrosse scholarship.

Bealefeld joined the Baltimore Police Department on May 11, 1981, holding several positions, including deputy commissioner of operations for the department, ultimately being appointed as commissioner by Mayor Sheila Dixon on July 19, 2007, following the resignation of Leonard Hamm. Dixon revealed that she asked Hamm to resign because she was impressed by Bealefeld. On May 3, 2012, having served as commissioner for five years, Bealefeld announced that he would resign as commissioner effective August 1. He was succeeded by former chief of the Oakland Police Department Anthony Batts.

== Early life ==
Bealefeld was born in August 1962. One of his great-grandfathers, grandfathers, and grand-uncles served the Baltimore Police Department, the latter of which was killed on duty; his younger brother later became a homicide detective. He graduated from Chesapeake High School in Anne Arundel County, Maryland, and attended Anne Arundel Community College (AACC), but dropped out due to a broken collar bone preventing him from getting a lacrosse scholarship.

== Career ==
After dropping out from AACC, Bealefeld joined the Baltimore Police Department (BPD) as a cadet on May 11, 1981, beginning his career as a patrol officer in the Western District. He was promoted to a sergeant in 1987, leaving the patrol division to become a detective in 1989. He rose through the ranks of the department, being promoted to lieutenant in 2000, major in 2002, lieutenant colonel in 2005, and colonel in 2006. He also held several positions in the administration of the department, becoming commander of the Second District in 2003, chief of patrol of East Baltimore in 2005, and chief of the criminal investigation division in 2006. He become deputy commissioner of operations for the department in February 9, 2007, being appointed by commissioner Leonard Hamm to replace Marcus Brown, who left for the Maryland Transportation Authority Police.

Following Hamm's resignation on July 19, 2007, Mayor of Baltimore Sheila Dixon was expected to name Bealefeld acting commissioner; however, other potential candidates included Errol Dutton, deputy commissioner of administrations for the BPD; Jesse B. Oden, head of the Baltimore housing division; Antonio Williams, the chief of the University of Maryland, Baltimore County police department; Barry W. Powell, a former deputy commissioner of the BPD; and Eddie Compass, the former superintendent of the New Orleans Police Department. At the time of Hamm's resignation, the city was on track to exceed 300 homicides in 2007, the highest since 1999, non-fatal shootings had risen 30%, and police morale was low. Bealefeld assumed the position of acting commissioner the same day, with Dixon revealing that she asked Hamm to resign because of falling approval, rising crime rates, and that she "wasn't feeling that drive like I wanted to" with Hamm and was impressed with Bealefeld. She also said that Bealefeld had been the de facto leader of the department for a few months.

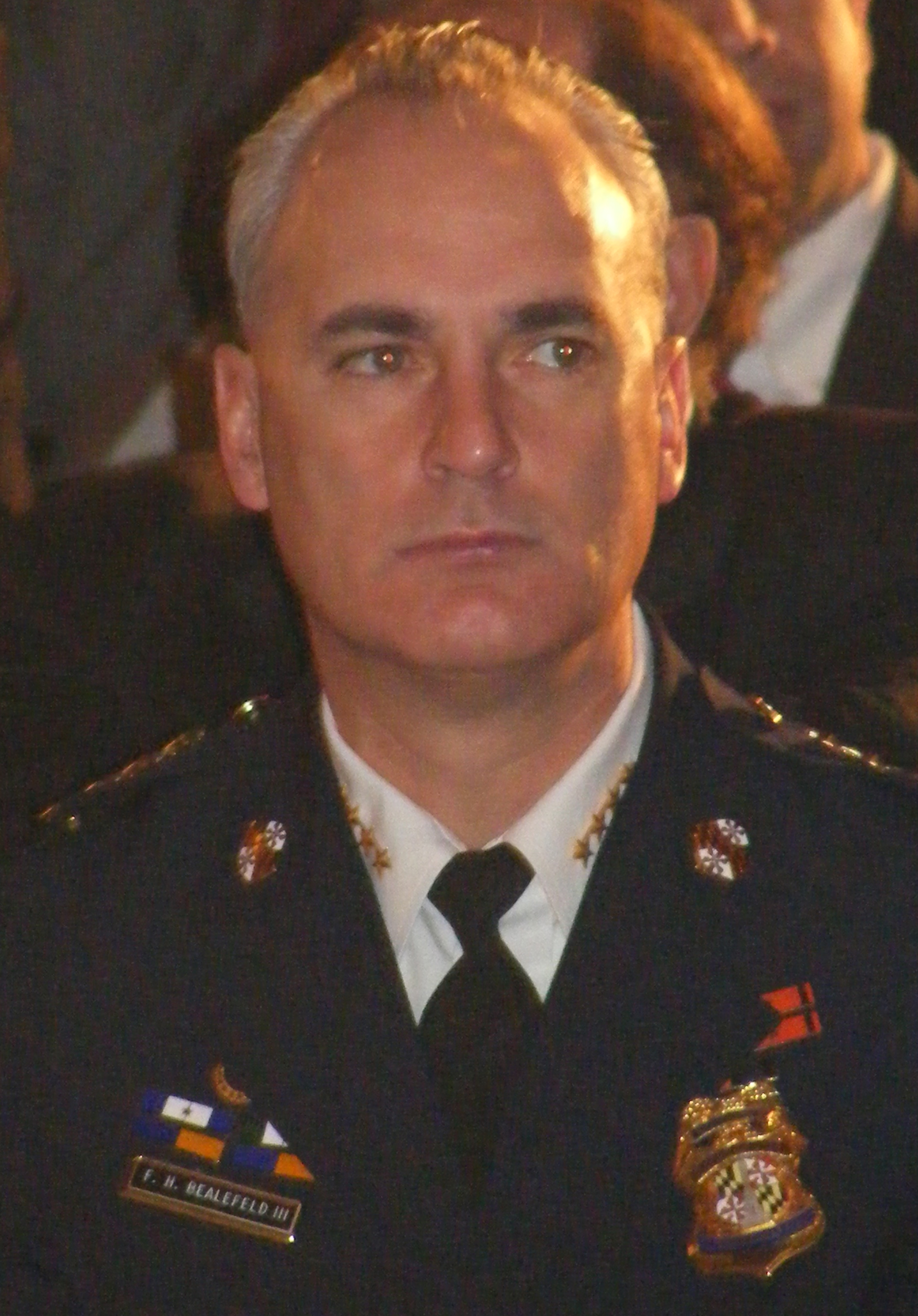
Bealefeld in December 2007

While campaigning for the 2007 Baltimore mayoral election, Dixon began to search for the next permanent commissioner. She considered eight candidates, including Charles H. Ramsey, former chief of the Metropolitan Police Department of the District of Columbia and future commissioner of the Philadelphia Police Department, who she considered to be neck and neck with Bealefeld. According to Dixon, Bealefeld edged out Ramsay because of his performance as acting commissioner, during which homicide rates and shootings were down from the same period in 2006, but overall year-to-date homicides and shootings increased. It was also hypothesized that Bealefeld had been picked due to being within the department, in contrast with the commissioners picked by previous mayor Martin O'Malley. Bealefeld was officially nominated for commissioner by Dixon on October 4, 2007. As commissioner, Bealefeld vowed to reduce crime rates and stabilize the department, while Paul M. Blair Jr., the president of the Baltimore Fraternal Order of Police, commented that Bealefeld would bring stability to the department and that "we don't need another outsider with no ties to the Baltimore community coming in here to try to tell us how to police".

After being nominated for commissioner, he appointed Anthony E. Barksdale as deputy commissioner of operations and Deborah A. Owens as deputy commissioner of administration. He also announced his intent to move to Baltimore from Howard County, where he lived with Linda and their children, due to a clause in the city charter which requires the commissioner to live in Baltimore. Bealefeld's nomination was unanimously approved by a Baltimore City Council committee on November 14, 2007, with the full council confirming him on November 19, 2007, with one abstention. As commissioner, he was known for his colloquialisms, calling criminals "bad guys with guns", "morons", and "knuckleheads".

On May 2, 2012, Bealefeld announced to Mayor Stephanie Rawlings-Blake that he would resign as commissioner effective August 1, 2012, to spend more time with his family, citing stress. While Rawlings-Blake asked that he reconsider, after consulting with his family, his retirement was officially announced the next day. During his five years as commissioner, the longest since the 15-year tenure of Donald Pomerleau, gun crime reduced by 24 percent and, in 2011, Baltimore had under 200 homicides, its lowest homicide rate since 1976, while arrest rates dropped from over 100,000 in 2005 to around 45,000 in 2011. As commissioner, his salary was US$194,815, receiving a pension of at least US$140,000. On August 28, 2012, Rawlings-Blake announced the appointment of Anthony Batts, the former chief of the Oakland Police Department, as commissioner to replace Bealefeld.

== Personal life and legacy ==
I am excited to be working with the students to help them connect the knowledge they receive in the classroom with real-world experiences that prepare them for careers in law enforcement and public safety.

— Bealefeld on joining Stevenson University, 2012

In either 1982 or 1983, he married his wife, Linda, with whom he had two children, Frederick IV (born 1991 or 1992) and Erica (born 1995 or 1996). On November 26, 2012, Bealefeld announced that he was joining Stevenson University as a distinguished professional in criminal justice as well as an instructor. At the time of the announcement, Justin Fenton, writing for The Baltimore Sun, described Bealefeld as "perhaps the city's most effective commissioner in recent history", also crediting him with improving officer education. He was a teacher at the university from January 2013 to June 2014. A month after leaving Stevenson, he joined Under Armour as a vice president and the chief global security officer, overseeing the protection of company employees and assets.

Police appointments
Preceded by Leonard Hamm	Commissioner of the Baltimore Police Department	Succeeded by Anthony Batts
