= Jimmy's Old Town Tavern =

Restaurant and bar in Herndon, Virginia

- Interactive map of Jimmy's Old Town Tavern

Restaurant information
- Established: 1997
- Location: Herndon, Virginia, United States
- Coordinates: 38.9693°N 77.3863°W

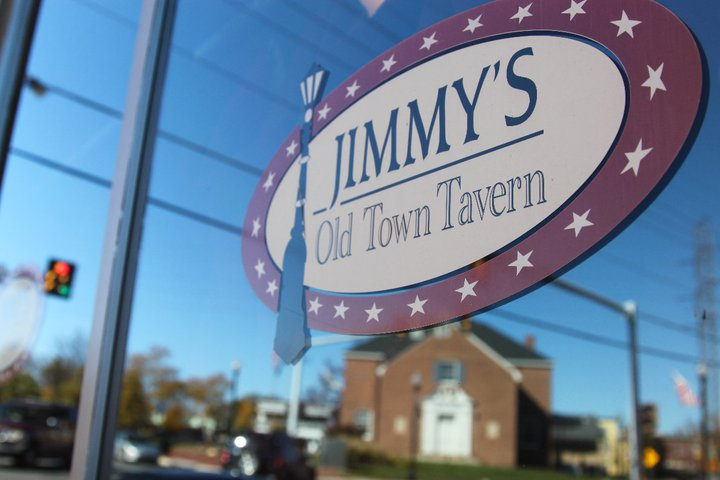

Jimmy’s Old Town Tavern is a restaurant and bar located in downtown Herndon, Virginia. Founded in 1997 by local restaurateur Jimmy Cirrito, the tavern operates in a late 19th-century commercial building and has become a longstanding fixture in Herndon’s historic district.

== History ==
Jimmy’s Old Town Tavern opened on May 29, 1997, after Cirrito renovated a building believed to date to the late 1800s within Herndon’s early downtown corridor. Cirrito had worked in the regional hospitality industry before establishing the tavern.

In 2018, the business completed a major expansion that added an outdoor beer garden and a dedicated kitchen. The project was described by local reporting as part of ongoing commercial growth in downtown Herndon.

== Building and location ==
The tavern occupies a structure situated at the intersection of Elden and Spring Streets, an area associated with Herndon's historic commercial development. The building contributes to the architectural continuity of the town’s historic district and is referenced in local tours and regional guides.

== Menu and concept ==
Jimmy’s serves American pub fare, including burgers, sandwiches, wings, pierogies, and rotating daily specials. Regional publications have highlighted the tavern’s Buffalo-style chicken wings and noted its role as a casual dining and entertainment venue. Weekly open-mic events, live music, and seasonal entertainment are part of the tavern’s programming.

== Awards and recognition ==
The Washington Post featured the tavern in a 1998 profile of Herndon dining and culture. Washingtonian discussed the restaurant’s menu and nightlife in 2009.

In 2024, the tavern won two editions of Northern Virginia Magazine’s NoVA Wars competition, securing first place in both the Wings Edition and the Cheesesteak Edition.
