= Gary Tuggle =

American drug enforcement agent and police officer

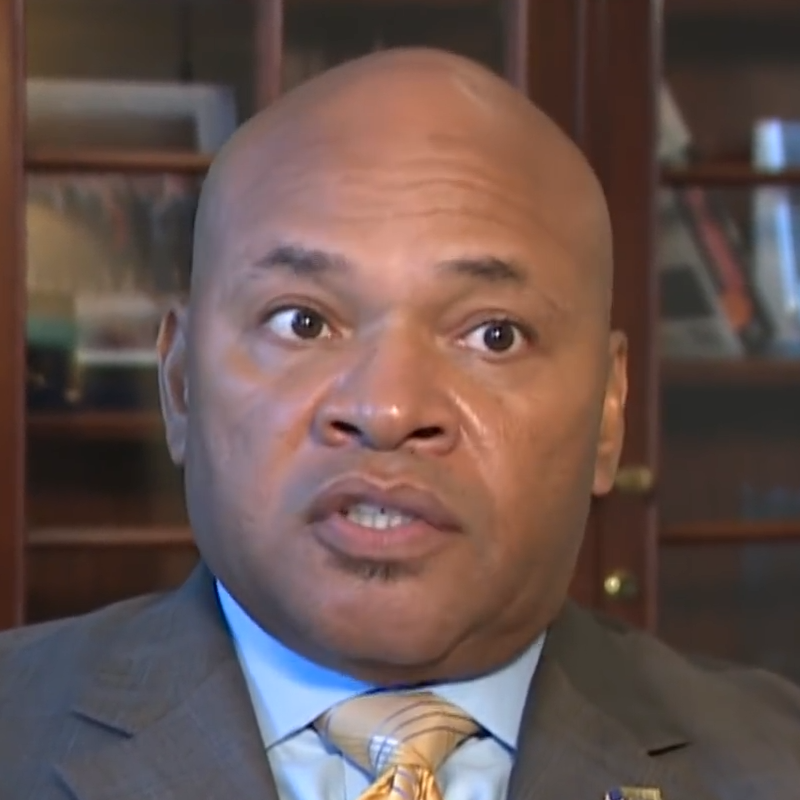
- Tuggle in 2017

Commissioner of the Baltimore Police Department
- Acting
- In office May 11, 2018 – 2019 (Note: It is unclear when Harrison entered office and Tuggle left between Harrison's appointment in January 2019 and his March swearing-in; at the time of the appointment, he was planned to enter office a few weeks later, while The Baltimore Banner reported he entered office "a month early".)
- Commissioner: Darryl De Sousa (until May 15) (Note: Tuggle became acting commissioner when De Sousa was placed on paid suspension on May 11; De Sousa resigned on May 15.)
- Preceded by: Darryl De Sousa
- Succeeded by: Michael S. Harrison

Personal details
- Born: 1963 or 1964 (age 62–63) Baltimore, Maryland, US
- Children: 4
- Education: Coppin State University (BS); Johns Hopkins University (MBA, MA)
- Police career
- Department: Baltimore Police Department
- Service years: 1980s; 2018–2019

Gary Tuggle (born 1963 or 1964) is an American former police officer and Drug Enforcement Administration (DEA) agent who served as acting commissioner of the Baltimore Police Department from 2018 to 2019.

Born and raised in Baltimore, Tuggle served in the Baltimore Police Department (BPD) in the 1980s and joined the DEA in 1992. He was an agent in Baltimore, Bridgetown, Chicago, and Miami. After serving as the DEA attaché to the Embassy of the United States, Port of Spain, he worked at DEA headquarters. He was appointed assistant special agent in charge of the Washington Field Division, managing the Baltimore office, in 2012, and head of the Philadelphia Field Division in 2015. He rejoined the BPD in 2018 as a deputy commissioner (Note: While WYPR reported that Casella was nominated for deputy commissioner of the Operations Bureau, WEAA reported Casella was nominated as deputy commissioner of the Strategic Investigations & Support Services Bureau and Andre Bonaparte was nominated as deputy commissioner of the Operations Bureau. The Baltimore Fishbowl also said Tuggle was deputy commissioner of the Strategic Investigations & Support Services Bureau when he became acting commissioner.) under Darryl De Sousa. Tuggle succeeded De Sousa as acting commissioner on May 11, 2018, when he was placed on paid suspension after an indictment for tax evasion. As acting commissioner, Tuggle suspended an officer who had been filmed assaulting a man, oversaw the implementation of the BPD's ShotSpotter system, and broke ground on a new headquarters for the BPD's mounted police. He announced that he would not seek to become permanent commissioner in October, saying he did not have sufficient commitment; Michael S. Harrison was appointed to replace him in January 2019 and sworn in two months later.

== Biography ==
Tuggle was born 1963 or 1964 in Baltimore, one of ten children. He was raised in East Baltimore and graduated from Patterson High School. He received a Bachelor of Science from Coppin State University and a Master of Business Administration and Master of Arts in government from Johns Hopkins University. He served the Baltimore Police Department (BPD) in the 1980s before leaving for the DEA. He is married with four children and lived in Upper Marlboro when he became commissioner.

== Drug Enforcement Administration ==
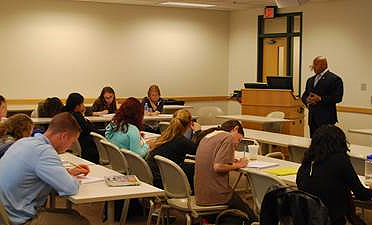
Tuggle lecturing at Lehigh University as head of the DEA Philadelphia Field Division, 2015

Tuggle joined the DEA in 1992, the first of his class to graduate. Ed Marcinko, a DEA agent who gave Tuggle a fitness test when he was a recruit, described Tuggle as having "a positive aura about him" and said, "that man’s going to go places". Tuggle was sent to the Caribbean in 1995 to serve in Bridgetown. He was also an agent in Baltimore and Miami. After serving in Chicago, he was the DEA attaché to the Embassy of the United States, Port of Spain. He then worked at the DEA headquarters. He served as an assistant special agent in charge of the Washington Field Division, managing the Baltimore office, from 2012 (Note: While The Baltimore Sun reports Tuggle moving to the Washington Field Division in 2013, a DEA press release reports 2012.) to 2015. On July 30, 2015, the DEA announced Tuggle's appointment as head of the Philadelphia Field Division, replacing David Dongilli. In February 2016, he led the office in an investigation with the Federal Bureau of Investigation and local police that lead to the seizure of about US$500,000 in prepackaged heroin and handguns and US$40,000 in cash near Newark, Delaware, potentially the biggest in Delaware history. He was appointed as vice chairman of the executive board of the Philadelphia High Intensity Drug Trafficking Area on August 19, 2017.

== Return to the Baltimore Police Department ==
On February 9, 2018, BPD commissioner Darryl De Sousa announced changes to the management of the BPD, including the appointment of Thomas Casella (Note: Also spelled "Cassella") as a deputy commissioner. Casella's appointment was suspended after two complaints against him – discovered during a background check – were leaked. Although De Sousa later said that the complaints against Casella were false, he said that they agreed not to proceed with the appointment. He selected Tuggle on March 2.

We’ve got a solid strategy. My responsibility now is to communicate it clearly to the troops, communicate it often, and give them the support that they need. The crime fight is multifaceted and it includes things like enhanced community engagement and proactive community policing. And part of that is ensuring that we improve the perception of the police department and improve the morale within the police department.

— Tuggle after becoming acting commissioner

Tuggle became acting commissioner on May 11, after De Sousa was indicted for tax evasion and placed on paid suspension by mayor Catherine Pugh. De Sousa resigned on May 15 and Tuggle continued as acting commissioner. As commissioner, Tuggle faced high violence rates – despite a decrease relative to 2017 under De Sousa – a federal consent decree on police use of violence, and the aftermath of De Sousa's indictment. Tuggle was undecided on whether he would seek to become permanent commissioner, saying "I haven't even had a solid discussion with my wife about it".

Tuggle made his first public appearance as acting commissioner on May 14, after a quadruple shooting. He described the department under him as "business as usual", saying he would keep the crime plan of De Sousa and that, "the priority is just keeping that continuity".

Under Tuggle, the BPD began implementing a ShotSpotter system in June, which uses sensors on buildings to alert nearby police officers to gunfire. The system was planned to be rolled out in a 5 square miles (13 km^{2}) area of West Baltimore and later spread to East Baltimore. Tuggle said the system "will continue to position us to be proactive in the crime fight, but also quickly reactive should a gun be discharged". ShotSpotter has been criticized for low accuracy and failing to reduce crime rates. In August, Tuggle suspended a BPD officer after a video was shared on Twitter by activist DeRay Mckesson of the officer tackling DeShawn McGrier against the steps of a house and repeatedly punching him after he yelled at the officer. A nearby officer did not intervene and McGrier did not fight back. Tuggle said the incident "deeply disturbed" him and launched an investigation. Pugh called for community policing that adheres to the United States Constitution, and said that she would seek to reestablish trust between the community and BPD. Tuggle accepted the assaulting officer's resignation the next day. The officer was investigated for second degree assault. Warren Brown, McGrier's attorney, said that the assault injured his jaw, nose, ribs, and eye socket. While Brown said the nearby officer should have intervened, Tuggle said that "he had an obligation not only to contain the situation that he had in front of him, but he [also] had an obligation to keep himself safe".

On September 17, the BPD, First Mile Stable Charitable Foundation, and B&O Railroad Museum broke ground on a new headquarters for the BPD mounted police. The headquarters was planned to be on 2.5 acres (1.0 ha), include 12 stalls, and cost US$2.5 million.

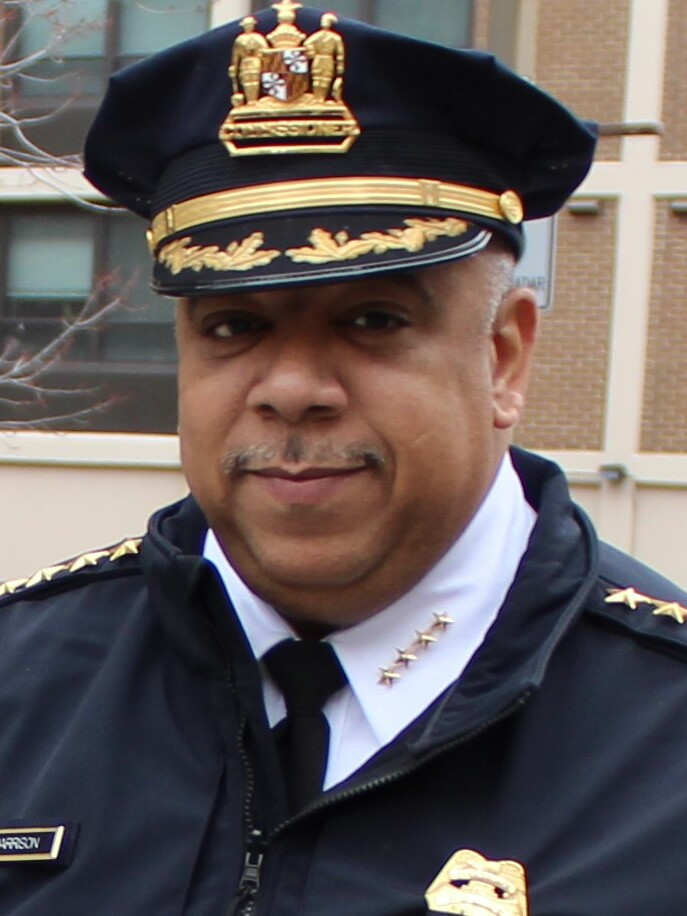
Michael S. Harrison succeeded Tuggle as commissioner.

Tuggle announced that he would not seek to be permanent commissioner on October 9, stating that while he believed the BPD's consent decree could be resolved, it would "take an extended commitment – I'm going to say five to seven years" that he did not have. Tuggle said he had not been interviewed for the position and Pugh said that she respected his withdrawal. City councilman Brandon Scott said that he did not think Tuggle had the sufficient support of the city council even if he were nominated, saying that Tuggle "didn't seem like he had the relationships and the wherewithal to garner the support". At the time of his announcement, Baltimore had its most fatal 30-day period since 2015 with 43 killings. Two days later, BPD chief spokesman T.J. Smith resigned, citing an "unstable environment" and "political turmoil".

On November 16, Pugh announced the appointment of Fort Worth Police Department chief Joel Fitzgerald as commissioner. After Fitzgerald withdrew from consideration due to résumé issues and a medical emergency with his son, she appointed Michael S. Harrison, the chief of the New Orleans Police Department, on January 8, 2019. Harrison was sworn in on March 12.

== Notes ==
Police appointments
Preceded by Darryl De Sousa	Commissioner of the Baltimore Police Department; Acting; 2018–2019	Succeeded by Michael S. Harrison
