= List of commissioners of the Baltimore Police Department =

Since 1920, the Baltimore Police Department has been led by a single commissioner. Prior to this, it was led by a multi-member board of commissioners.

== Commissioners of the Baltimore Police Department ==
=== Presidents of the Board of Police Commissioners ===
Before 1920, the department was led by a multi-member Board of Police Commissioners. This board was led by a president.

Order	Name	Tenure start	Tenure end	Mayor(s) served alongside/under	Ref
1st	Charles Howard	1850	1861	John Hanson Thomas Jerome; John Smith Hollins; Samuel Hinks; Thomas Swann; George William Brown	
Department under United States Military control (June 1861–March 29, 1862)				John C. Blackburn; John L. Chapman	
2nd	Nicholas L. Wood	March 29, 1862	1864	John L. Chapman	
3rd	Samuel Hindes	1864	November 15, 1866	John L. Chapman	
4th	James Young	November 15, 1866	March 1867		
5th	LeFevre Jarrett	March 1867	March 14, 1870		
6th	John W. Davis	March 14, 1870	March 15, 1871		
7th	William H. B. Fusselbaugh	March 15, 1871	March 15, 1881		
8th	George Colton	March 15, 1881	March 15, 1887		
9th	Edson M. Schryver	March 15, 1887	March 15, 1897		
10th	Daniel C. Heddinger	March 15, 1897	May 7, 1900		
11th	George M. Upshur	May 7, 1900	May 2, 1904		
12th	George R. Willis	May 2, 1904	May 4, 1908		
13th	Sherlock Swann	May 4, 1908	May 2, 1910		
14th	John B. A. Wheltle	May 2, 1910	April 4, 1912		
15th	Morris Ames Soper	April 4, 1912	December 31, 1913		
16th	James McEvoy	December 31, 1913	December 28, 1914		
17th	Daniel C. Ammidon	December 28, 1914	March 22, 1916		
18th	Lawrason Riggs	May 1, 1916	1920		

=== Police commissioners since 1920 ===
Order	Name	Tenure start	Tenure end	Mayor(s) served alongside/under	Notes	Ref
19th	Charles D. Gaither	1920	1937		First solo police commissioner after disestablishment of board of commissioners	
20th	William P. Lawson	1937	July 31, 1938			
—N/a	Stephen G. Nelson (interim)	July 31, 1938	September 23, 1938			
21st	Robert F. Stanton	September 23, 1938	1943			
22nd	Hamilton R. Atkinson	1943	1949			
23rd	Beverly Ober	1949	April 7, 1955		Died in office.	
—N/a	Fred L. Ford (interim)	April 7, 1955	1955			
24th	James M. Hepbron	1955	1961			
25th	Bernard Schmidt	1961	1966			
26th	Donald Pomerleau	1966	1981			
27th	Frank Battaglia	1981	1984			
28th	Bishop Robinson	1984	1987			
29th	Edward J. Tilghman	1987	1989			
30th	Edward V. Woods	1989	1993			
31st	Thomas C. Frazier	1994	October 1, 1999	Kurt Schmoke		
John E. Gavrilis, Elbert Shirley, and Robert Smith rotated as interim police commissioners		October 1, 1999	2000	Kurt Schmoke; Martin O'Malley		
32nd	Ronald L. Daniel	February 7, 2000	March 29, 2000	Martin O'Malley		
33rd	Edward T. Norris	2000	2002	Martin O'Malley		
34th	Kevin P. Clark	2002	2004	Martin O'Malley		
35th	Leonard Hamm	2004	2007	Martin O'Malley; Sheila Dixon		
36th	Frederick H. Bealefeld III	2007	2012	Sheila Dixon; Stephanie Rawlings-Blake		
37th	Anthony Batts	September 27, 2012	July 8, 2015	Stephanie Rawlings-Blake		
38th	Kevin Davis	July 8, 2015	January 19, 2018	Stephanie Rawlings-Blake; Catherine Pugh	Interim commissioner from July 8, 2015, to October 19, 2015.	
39th	Darryl De Sousa	January 19, 2018	May 15, 2018	Catherine Pugh	Interim commissioner from January 19, 2018, to February 26, 2018.	
—N/a	Gary Tuggle (interim)	May 15, 2018	2019	Catherine Pugh		
40th	Michael S. Harrison	March 12, 2019	June 8, 2023	Catherine Pugh; Jack Young; Brandon Scott		
41st	Richard Worley	June 8, 2023	—N/a	Brandon Scott	Interim commissioner from June 8, 2023, to October 2, 2023.	

== Board of Commissioners membership (1850–1920) ==
=== Timeline ===
Board of Commissioners composition (1850–1920)
Time period	President	Other members
1850–1861	Charles Howard	John W. Davis; William H. Gatchell; Charles D. Hinks; mayor an ex-officio member
June 1861–March 29, 1862; Department was under United States Military control. Board members appointed by the military authorities.		Thomas Kelso; John R. Kelso; Columbus O'Donnell; John W. Randolph; Joseph Roberts; John B. Seidenstricker; Archibald Sterling Jr.; Peter Sauerwein; Michael Warner
March 29, 1862–1864	Nicholas L. Wood	Samuel Hinds; mayor an ex-officio member
1864–November 15, 1866	Samuel Hindes	Nicholas K. Woods; mayor an ex-officio member
November 15, 1866–March 1867	James Young	William T. Valiant; mayor an ex-officio member
March 1867–March 14, 1870	LeFevre Jarrett	James E. Carr; William H. B. Fusselbaugh
March 14, 1870–March 15, 1871	John W. Davis	James E. Carr; William H. B. Fusselbaugh
March 15, 1871–March 15, 1875	William H. B. Fusselbaugh	James E. Carr; Thomas W. Morse
March 15, 1875–March 15, 1877	William H. B. Fusselbaugh	Harry Gilmor; John Milroy
March 15, 1877–April 12, 1878	William H. B. Fusselbaugh	Harry Gilmor; James R. Hebert
April 12, 1878–March 15, 1881	William H. B. Fusselbaugh	James R. Herbert; John Milroy
March 15, 1881–August 5, 1884	George Colton	James R. Herbert; John Milroy
August 5, 1884–February 25, 1886	George Colton	John Milroy; J. D. Furguson
February 25, 1886–June 25, 1886	George Colton	John Q. A. Robson; John Milroy
June 25, 1886–March 15, 1887	George Colton	John Q. A. Robson; Afred J. Carr
March 15, 1887–January 23, 1888	Edson M. Schryver	Alfred J. Carr
June 25, January 23, 1888–December 1, 1894	Edson M. Schryver	John Gil Jr.; John Q. A. Robson
December 1, 1894–March 27, 1896	Edson M. Schryver	John Gil Jr.; John C. Legg
March 27, 1896–March 15, 1897	Edson M. Schryver	Jonh Gill Jr.; Daniel C. Heddinger
March 15, 1897–May 7, 1900	Daniel C. Heddinger	William W. Johnson; Edison M. Schryver
May 7, 1900–March 23, 1904	George M. Upshur	Edward H. Fowler; John T. Morris
March 23, 1904–May 2, 1904	George M. Upshur	John T. Morris; Thomas J. Shryock
May 2, 1904–May 4, 1908	George R. Willis	James H. Preston; Thomas J. Shryock
May 4, 1908–May 2, 1910	Sherlock Swann	Peter E. Tome; John B. A. Wheltle
May 2, 1910–April 4, 1912	John B. A. Wheltle	Peter E. Tome; C. Baker Clotworthy
April 4, 1912–May 6, 1912	John B. A. Wheltle	Peter E. Tome; Morris Ames Soper
May 6, 1912–December 31, 1913	Morris Ames Soper	Daniel C. Ammidon; Alfred S. Niles
December 31, 1913–December 28, 1914	James McEvoy	Daniel C. Ammidon; Alfred S. Niles
December 28, 1914–March 22, 1916	Daniel C. Ammidon	Clarendon I. T. Gould; Alfred S. Niles
March 22, 1916–May 1, 1916	Daniel C. Ammidon	Lawrason Riggs; Alfred S. Niles
May 1, 1916–1920	Lawrason Riggs	Daniel C. Ammidon; Edward F. Burke

=== List of members by name ===
The following is a list of all of those who served as members of the former board of commissioners. Periods as board president are also noted in itallics:

- Daniel C. Ammidon (April 4, 1912–1920) –president December 28, 1914 – March 22, 1916
- Alfred J. Carr (June 25, 1886–January 23, 1888)
- James E. Carr (March 1867–March 15, 1871)
- C. Baker Clotworthy (May 2, 1910–April 4, 1912)
- George Colton (March 15, 1881–March 15, 1887) -president March 15, 1881 – March 15, 1887
- John W. Davis (1850–1861; March 14, 1870–March 15, 1871) –chair March 14, 1870 – March 15, 1871
- J. D. Ferguson (August 5, 1884–February 25, 1886)
- Edward H. Fowler (May 7, 1900–March 23, 1904)
- John Gill Jr. (January 23, 1888–March 15, 1897)
- Clarendon I. T. Gould (December 28, 1914–March 22, 1916)
- William H. B. Fusselbaugh (March 1867–March 15, 1881) -president March 15, 1871 – March 15, 1881
- William H. Gatchell (1850–1861)
- Harry Gilmor (March 15, 1875–April 12, 1878)
- Daniel C. Heddinger (March 27, 1896–May 7, 1900) –president March 15, 1897 – May 7, 1900
- James R. Herbert (April 12, 1878–August 5, 1884)
- Samuel Hindes (March 29, 1862–November 15, 1866) -president March 29, 1862 – November 15, 1866
- Charles D. Hinks (1850–1861)
- Charles Howard (1850–1861) -president 1850–1860
- LeFevre Jarrett (March 1867–March 14, 1870) –president March 1867–March 14, 1870
- William W. Johnson (March 15, 1897–May 7, 1900)
- Thomas Kelso (June 22, 1861–March 29, 1862 appointed by military)
- John R. Kelso (June 22, 1861–March 29, 1862 appointed by military)
- John C. Legg (December 1, 1894–March 27, 1896)
- James McEvoy (December 31, 1913–December 28, 1914) –president December 31, 1913 – December 28, 1914
- John Milroy (March 15, 1875 – March 15, 1877; April 12, 1878 – June 25, 1886)
- John T. Morris (May 7, 1900 – May 2, 1904)
- Thomas W. Morse (March 15, 1871 – March 15, 1875)
- Alfred S. Niles (May 6, 1912 – May 1, 1916)
- Columbus O'Donnell (June 22, 1861 – March 29, 1862 appointed by military)
- James H. Preston (May 2, 1904 – May 4, 1908)
- John W. Randolph (June 22, 1861 – March 29, 1862 appointed by military)
- Lawrason Riggs (March 22, 1916 – 1920) –president May 1, 1916–1920
- Joseph Roberts (June 22, 1861 – March 29, 1862 appointed by military)
- John Q. A. Robson (February 25, 1886 – December 1, 1894)
- Peter Sauerwein (June 22, 1861 – March 29, 1862 appointed by military)
- John B. Seidenstricker (June 22, 1861 – March 29, 1862 appointed by military)
- Archibald Sterling Jr. (June 22, 1861 – March 29, 1862 appointed by military)
- Edson M. Schryver (March 15, 1887 – May 7, 1900) –president March 15, 1887–March 15, 1897
- Thomas J. Shryock (March 23, 1904 – May 4, 1908)
- George A. Solter (1910–1914)
- Morris Ames Soper (April 4, 1912 – December 31, 1913) –president May 6, 1912–December 31, 1913
- Peter E. Tome (May 4, 1908 – May 6, 1912)
- Michael Warner (June 22, 1861 – March 29, 1862 appointed by military)
- George R. Willis (May 2, 1904 – May 4, 1908) –president May 2, 1904–May 4, 1908
- John B. A. Wheltle (May 4, 1908 – May 6, 1912) –president May 2, 1910–1912
- Nicholas L. Wood (March 29, 1862 – November 15, 1866) -president 1850–1860
- George M. Upshur (May 7, 1900 – May 2, 1904) –president 1900-1904
- William T. Valiant (November 15, 1866–March 1867)
- James Young (November 15, 1866–March 1867)

==== Mayors that served as ex-officio members ====
- John Hanson Thomas Jerome (1850–1852)
- John Smith Hollins (1852–1854)
- Samuel Hinks (1854–1856)
- Thomas Swann (1856–1860)
- George William Brown (1860–1861)
- John L. Chapman (1862–1867)
