= Ed Norris =

American radio host, actor and former law enforcement officer

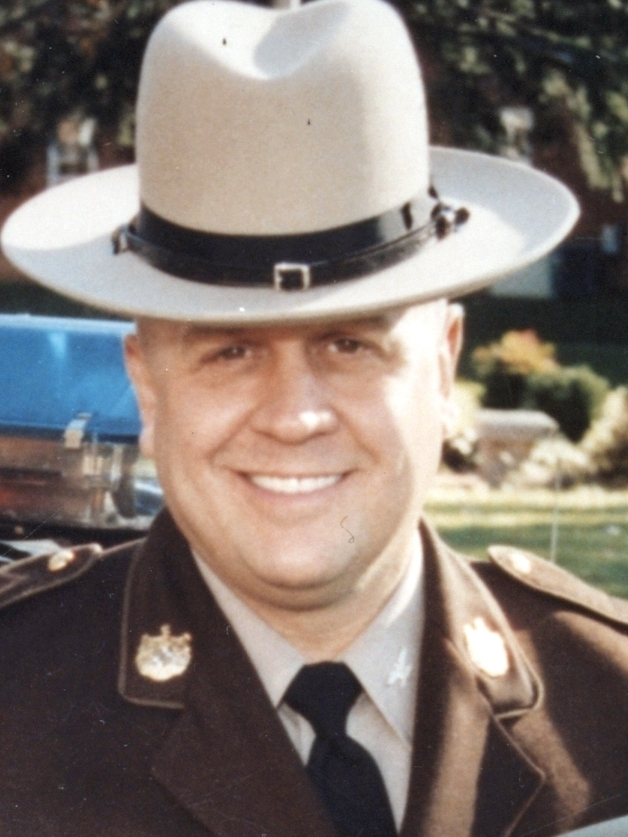
- Maryland State Police, circa 2003

Superintendent of Maryland State Police
- In office January 15, 2003 – December 10, 2003
- Governor: Bob Ehrlich
- Preceded by: David B. Mitchell
- Succeeded by: Thomas E. Hutchins

Commissioner of the Baltimore City Police Department
- In office 2000–2002
- Mayor: Martin O'Malley
- Preceded by: Ronald L. Daniel
- Succeeded by: Kevin P. Clark

Deputy Commissioner of Operations and Crime Control Strategies, New York City Police Department
- In office 1996–2000
- Commissioner: Howard Safir
- Preceded by: Jack Maple
- Succeeded by: Garry McCarthy

Personal details
- Born: April 10, 1960 (age 66) Brooklyn, New York, U.S.

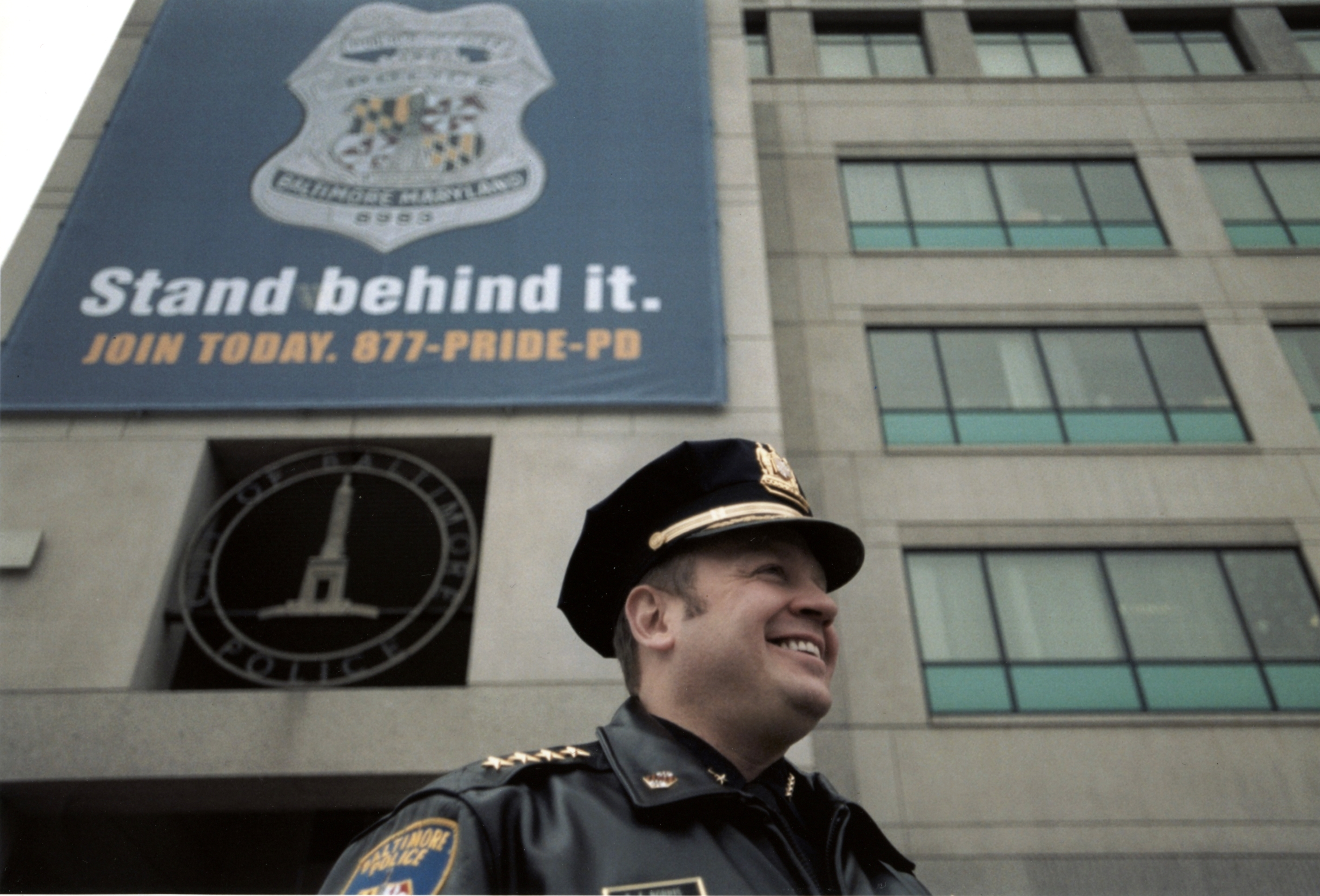
Ed Norris outside of police headquarters in Baltimore, Maryland circa 2000.

Edward T. Norris (born April 10, 1960) is an American radio host, actor and former law enforcement officer in Maryland. He is the cohost of a talk show on WJZ-FM (105.7 The Fan) in Baltimore, Maryland. Norris, a 20-year veteran of the New York Police Department, served as Police Commissioner for Baltimore from 2000 to late 2002 and Superintendent of the Maryland State Police in 2003. Norris played the eponymous detective Edward Norris in HBO's The Wire. In 2003, Norris was convicted of a felony and spent six months in federal prison.

== Early life and education ==
Norris was born on April 10, 1960, in Brooklyn, New York. He is of Irish and Italian descent. He graduated from Brooklyn Technical High School and attended the University of Rochester. At Rochester, Norris played football, was president of the boxing club, and boxed in the light heavyweight division as an amateur. Financial setbacks led to Norris' departure from Rochester, and jump-started his career in law enforcement, as he was sworn into the New York Police Department. Norris later completed his college career at St. John's University and earned a Bachelor of Science in Criminal Justice.

== NYPD career ==
Norris was sworn in as a member of the New York Police Department on September 2, 1980. Upon graduating from the Police Academy, Norris was assigned to the Midtown South Precinct in Midtown Manhattan (Times Square). During Norris's tenure with the NYPD he held the ranks of Police Officer, Sergeant, Lieutenant, Captain, Deputy Inspector, Deputy Chief and Deputy Commissioner of Operations. Norris worked various assignments throughout the five boroughs of New York City: uniformed patrol, narcotics, detective bureau, fugitive division, and cold case squad.

As Captain, Norris took command of the Fugitive Division. In his first year, the number of fugitives captured doubled from 6,000 to 12,000. Norris was promoted to Deputy Inspector by then Police Commissioner Bill Bratton.

To further reduce crime, Norris proposed the idea of creating a special squad to focus on unsolved violent crimes, such as murder and forcible rape. In the first six weeks after creating the Cold Case Squad, the unit re-investigated and solved 27 previously unsolved murders, which generated national interest. NPR launched a story by Melissa Block featuring the unit on All Things Considered. The squad inspired the book The Restless Sleep: Inside New York City's Cold Case Squad by Stacy Horn and A&E's television series Cold Case Files.

As a result of Norris's many accomplishments, he was promoted from Deputy Inspector to Deputy Commissioner by then Police Commissioner Howard Safir. Over the next four years, Norris presided over the Compstat meetings along with Chief of Department Louis Anemone. Norris was also responsible for devising and implementing all crime reduction strategies during that term. During Norris's service, New York City experienced a dramatic decline in crime.

Norris actively lectured about the NYC Crime Reduction Plan throughout the United States and Europe including the FBI National Academy in Quantico, the French National Police Academy in Paris, Interpol in Lyon, France and the German National Police Academy in Rhineland Westphalia.

== The murder of Meir Kahane ==
While commander of the 17th Detective Squad, Norris led the investigation into the murder of Meir Kahane, an American-Israeli rabbi and ultranationalist writer and political figure. At the time, the NYPD officially classified the murder as the act of a lone gunman, over the protests of Norris who warned of a bigger conspiracy. After the 1993 World Trade Center bombing, it was later revealed that Kahane was the first al-Qaeda murder inside the United States, as well as the first incident leading up to 9/11.

Kahane was killed in a Manhattan hotel by an Arab gunman on November 5, 1990, after Kahane concluded a speech warning American Jews to immigrate to Israel before it was "too late". He was shot by El Sayyid Nosair, an Egyptian-born American citizen. Nosair fled the room, shooting 74-year-old Irving Franklin. As Nosair continued onto Lexington Avenue, attempting to flee in a taxi, he saw a police officer approaching him. Nosair stepped out of the taxi and fired shots toward the officer. The officer returned fire and both men lay wounded in the street. Upon searching Nosair's wallet, a list was found containing the names of several New York elected officials along with Nosair's New Jersey address.

At Nosair's home, detectives found and arrested two Egyptian men who admitted to driving taxis for a living as well as being in the vicinity at the time of the shooting. The ensuing search of Nosair's home revealed many items of concern including photographs of New York City landmarks, classified US military documents, bomb-making manuals, and books containing Arabic diagrams that Norris believed to represent plans to hijack an armored car. These diagrams were later revealed to be a plan to assassinate then Egyptian President, Hosni Mubarak.

The next morning, while briefing the Chief of Detectives, Norris refuted the NYPD's assertion that this was the act of a single crazed gunman. Norris described the evidence and the drivers of the believed get-away car in custody. The Chief of Detectives told Norris, "you shut up and handle the murder, they do conspiracies," pointing to the FBI agents in the room. Norris was then ordered to release the cab drivers and turn over his documents. Nosair was sent to prison for the Kahane assassination and the cab drivers were released.

One of the released cab drivers later rented the van that was used in the bombing of the World Trade Center in 1993. During the World Trade Center bombing trial, the documents uncovered from Nosair's home were translated to reveal the words Al Qaeda, and a descriptive roadmap of 9/11. Norris's vision of a bigger plot in the single murder case have been mentioned in The Cell by John Miller and Michael Stone, 1000 Years for Revenge by Peter Lance, House of Bush, House of Saud: The Secret Relationship between the World's Two Most Powerful Dynasties by Craig Unger, and several others books.

== Baltimore Police Department Police Commissioner ==
In March 2000, Norris was selected to become Commissioner of the Baltimore Police Department (BPD) by Mayor Martin O'Malley. During Norris' leadership role, for the first time in over a decade, murders fell below 300 for the year, leading the nation in crime decline for major cities during 2000 to late 2002. In addition to lower crime rates, there were also reduced civilian complaints and police involved shootings. Norris won the NAACP President's Award for police and community relations.

Norris created a fugitive division that cleared a warrant backlog of 250 people that were wanted for murder or attempted murder. Norris also re-established the aviation unit after it was grounded years before. After bringing state-of-the-art technology to the BPD, the federal government evaluated the BPD camera system in an effort to apply this technology to border control.

Norris' leadership techniques were taught to MBA students, the military, Congress, and business leaders for ten years at the Darden School of Business at the University of Virginia. The case study describes his efforts to lead an agency from crisis to success (Edward Norris and the Baltimore Police Department). These leadership techniques have also been taught at the Kelley School of Business at Indiana University, Harvard University and many others.

He left the Baltimore Police Department in December 2002, to accept the job as Maryland's next state police superintendent. Prior to leaving, he was "criticized as being an absentee leader and for excessive spending from an off-the-books expense account" and an audit of the fund "found major lapses in oversight" and use "for questionable purchases." Norris agreed to pay back $6,000.

== Maryland State Police Superintendent ==
In 2002, following his term as Baltimore Police Commissioner, Norris was appointed Maryland State Police (MSP) Superintendent under Gov. Robert L. Ehrlich, Jr. During his service with MSP, Norris created the first 24-hour terrorist watch center in Maryland. He also created the Interstate Criminal Enforcement (ICE) Team which focused on removing drugs and guns from Maryland highways. Norris settled a consent decree with Department of Justice.

He resigned from that position when he was indicted on criminal charges.

== Criminal case ==
In December 2003, Norris was indicted on three charges by U.S. Attorney Thomas DiBiagio. Two of the counts charged Norris had made illegal personal expenditures of over $20,000 from the Baltimore Police Department's supplemental account in order to pay for expensive gifts, personal expenses, and extramarital affairs with at least six women. The third count alleged that he had lied on a mortgage application, stating that approximately $9,000 he received from his father was a gift, when it was actually a loan.

Norris was investigated by the US Attorney of Maryland for abuse of a non-taxpayer funded expense account. While looking for violations, it was discovered that Norris borrowed $9,000 from his father for a home purchase. Norris and his father signed gift letters stating the money was a gift. It was discovered that Norris had returned the money to his father at a later date; at that point the gift became a loan. Norris was then indicted for making a false statement on a mortgage application.

In a plea agreement, the mortgage charge was dropped in exchange for a guilty plea of abusing the expense account, which Norris had denied. On March 8, 2004, Norris pleaded guilty to federal corruption and tax charges. Norris was sentenced to six months in federal prison in Yazoo City, Mississippi and Atlanta, Georgia, to be followed by three years of supervised probation and ordered to perform 500 hours of community service. The case alleged lavish gifts and meals were given to friends and girlfriends.

Despite the guilty plea, Norris has publicly maintained his innocence claiming that the case was politically motivated and the guilty plea was forced because of his mortgage issue. In an October 9, 2006, newspaper article Norris admitted to using the money from the accounts, but said that he paid it back in full before he left office to take the position of Maryland State Police Superintendent.

== Entertainment career ==
Norris is a popular American radio personality and actor. He is the cohost of the Big Bad Morning Show on CBS WJZ-FM (105.7 The FAN) in Baltimore, Maryland that airs on weekday mornings from 6 am to 10 am. The show primarily focuses on sports and often includes other topics such as Maryland politics and crime. Norris is also featured on a weekly news segment on Fox 45 TV. Norris is widely known for his role as Detective Edward Norris on HBO's hit television series, The Wire (2002-2008) as well as the investigator in the movie Jack the Ripper in America (2009).

Norris became a published author in 2017 with the release of his hardcover book, Way Down in the Hole. Co-written with The Baltimore Sun reporter and author Kevin Cowherd, Way Down in the Hole is described by the publisher as "the incredible story of America's most promising cop, the dark forces that brought him down and his long, emotional journey back from the abyss."

Norris promoted the book with a two-month-long book signing tour that began in Baltimore's Mount Washington Tavern. His first bookstore appearance took place at Greetings & Readings in the Hunt Valley Towne Centre on Saturday, April 22, with co-author Kevin Cowherd.

=== Media ===
- Big Bad Morning Show on CBS WJZ-FM (105.7 The FAN)
- Weekly news segment on Fox 45 TV
- The Wire, 2002-2008
- Jack the Ripper in America, 2009
- Way Down in the Hole, 2017

Police appointments
Preceded by Ronald L. Daniel	Commissioner of the Baltimore Police Department; 2000-2002	Succeeded by Kevin P. Clark
