= Kevin P. Clark =

Commissioner of the Baltimore Police Department from 2003 to 2004

- Police career
- Country: United States
- Department: New York Police Department; Baltimore Police Department
- Service years: 19??-2003; 2003-2004
- Rank: Commissioner

Kevin Clark is a former commissioner of the Baltimore Police Department, who held the position from early 2003 until November 2004. A former NYPD officer, Clark's term as police commissioner was strained with both the mayor and police department as Clark was involved in domestic issues and an unpopular turnover of veteran officers such as former Major Gary D'Addario. He was fired by then-mayor Martin O'Malley, resulting in a lawsuit in which he sought $120 million in damages and fought to get back his job. O'Malley's justification for the firing had been that these accusations were distracting to his duties as a commissioner.

According to the motions filed to Clark, the firing was a violation of his contract.

On the day of his firing, O'Malley named Leonard Hamm as the interim commissioner, a job to which Hamm would be permanently assigned.

In 2005, Clark made a request to the Baltimore board of estimates for $75,000 in severance pay. On April 4 of that year, Clark lost his case in court. But in July 2006, an appeals court reinstated his suit.

Police appointments
| Preceded by Ed Norris | Commissioner of the Baltimore Police Department; 2003-2004 | Succeeded by Leonard Hamm |
