= Malik Hamm =

American football player (born 2000)

Profile
- Position: Linebacker

Personal information
- Born: August 26, 2000 (age 26); Baltimore, Maryland, U.S.
- Listed height: 6 ft 3 in (1.91 m)
- Listed weight: 254 lb (115 kg)

Career information
- High school: Baltimore City College
- College: Lafayette (2018–2022)
- NFL draft: 2023: undrafted

Career history
- Baltimore Ravens (2023–2025)
- Stats at Pro Football Reference

Malik Hamm (born August 26, 2000) is an American professional football linebacker. He played college football for the Lafayette Leopards and was signed as an undrafted free agent by the Ravens after the 2023 NFL draft.

== Early life ==
Hamm was born and grew up in Baltimore, Maryland where he attended Baltimore City public schools. He played high school football at Baltimore City College, the same high school that his grandfather, Leonard Hamm attended. In his last game as a senior, with his team trailing its arch-rival, Poly, Hamm recovered 2 fumbles and intercepted a pass to lead City to a 22-18 win. Hamm was a two-year captain on City's football team and was also a two-year captain as an attacker on the lacrosse team. He was also on City's track & field team for one season, specializing in the shot put.

== College career ==
In Hamm's career he was named the Patriot League Freshman of the Year in 2018 and the Patriot League Defensive player of the year twice in 2019, and 2022. Hamm also finished his career as Lafayette's all-time sack leader with 32 in his career.

== Professional career ==
Pre-draft measurables
Height	Weight	Arm length	Hand span	40-yard dash	10-yard split	20-yard split	20-yard shuttle	Three-cone drill	Vertical jump	Broad jump	Bench press
6 ft 2 5/8 in (1.90 m)	246 lb (112 kg)	31 1/2 in (0.80 m)	9 1/2 in (0.24 m)	5.06 s	1.74 s	2.88 s	4.43 s	7.20 s	29.0 in (0.74 m)	9 ft 0 in (2.74 m)	25 reps
All values from Pro Day

Hamm was selected 9th overall in the 2023 USFL draft by the Pittsburgh Maulers, however he decided not to play for them and instead declared for the NFL Draft.

After not being selected in the 2023 NFL draft, Hamm signed with the Baltimore Ravens as an undrafted free agent. On August 21, 2023 in a pre-season game against the Washington Commanders Hamm had 2 tackles and a fumble recovery, but injured his ACL and had to leave the game. A week later, the Ravens announced that he had made the initial 53-man roster, but he was placed on injured reserve two days later.

On July 30, 2024, Hamm was placed on injured reserve after suffering a season–ending knee injury.

On August 26, 2025, Hamm was waived by the Ravens as part of final roster cuts and re-signed to the practice squad the next day. He was released on September 9 and re-signed to the practice squad on September 16.
