= George Colton (Maryland politician) =

American politician and printer (1817–1898)

Member of the Maryland House of Delegates from the Baltimore's 2nd district
- In office 1888–1892 Serving with Henry Bargar, Charles H. Carter, Harry C. Cox, John Henning Jones, James H. Preston, James W. Denny, Charles D. Gaither, Patrick Reilly, Alexander H. Robertson
- In office 1868–1872 Serving with James L. Clark, George A. Kirk, John Staylor Jr., William E. Stewart, John M. Travers, Ferdinand C. Latrobe, James L. McLane, John F. Wiley, Greenbury Wilson, G. Morris Bond, Michael A. Mullin, James Pentland, H. Tillard Smith

President of the Baltimore Board of Police Commissioners
- In office March 15, 1871 – March 15, 1881
- Preceded by: William H. B. Fusselbaugh
- Succeeded by: Edson M. Schryver

Personal details
- Born: October 31, 1817 Portsmouth, England
- Died: May 4, 1898 (aged 80) Baltimore, Maryland, U.S.
- Resting place: Green Mount Cemetery; Baltimore, Maryland, U.S.
- Party: Democratic
- Spouse: Lydia Jane Hamilton (m. 1842)
- Children: 5
- Occupation: Politician; newspaperman; printer; tailor; farmer

George Colton (October 31, 1817 – May 4, 1898) was an American politician, printer and newspaperman. He served as member of the Maryland House of Delegates, representing Baltimore's 2nd district, from 1868 to 1872 and 1888 to 1892. Colton served as president of the Baltimore Board of Police Commissioners. He owned and operated both the Maryland Republican in the 1860s and the Baltimore Gazette in the 1880s.

== Early life ==
George Colton was born on October 31, 1817, in Portsmouth, England to Elizabeth (née Moore) and John Colton. His father was a soldier of the British Army. In 1819, the family emigrated to the United States and settled in Leonardtown, Maryland. Colton lost his father at the age of thirteen and was apprenticed as a tailor though had an affinity to reading and was knowledgeable on English literature.

== Career ==
After serving as an apprentice, Colton opened a tailor shop at Leonardtown. He then opened a shop at West River, Maryland. After not finding success, Colton opened a general store. In 1847, his store burned down and he was in debt. He spent the next fourteen years, until 1861, paying off the debts to creditors he owed. In 1852, President Polk appointed Colton as postmaster of West River. In the same year, he left and started to work at a state tobacco warehouse in Baltimore. He worked there until 1859. From 1860 to 1861, Colton worked as a purveyor at the almshouse but was removed due to his "rebel proclivities".

Colton was a Democrat. Colton served in the Maryland House of Delegates, representing district 2 (the nineteenth ward) of Baltimore, from 1868 to 1872. During his four years, he served as chairman of the committee on claims. From 1873 to 1875, Colton worked as a director of the Chesapeake and Ohio Canal and the Baltimore and Ohio Railroad. From 1874 to 1880, Colton held the office of state printer. Colton was appointed as a police commissioner of the Baltimore Police Department on March 15, 1881. He remained in office until March 15, 1887, when his term expired. He served in the Maryland House of Delegates, representing District 2 (the ninth ward) of Baltimore, from 1888 to 1892. In 1890, he served as chairman of the committee on corporations. Colton was associated with the Gorman–Rasin political organization of Baltimore, run by Arthur Pue Gorman and Isaac Freeman Rasin.

In 1865, Colton purchased an Annapolis newspaper, the Maryland Republican. He worked on the paper with his son Luther. Colton sold the Maryland Republican after the death of his son Luther in 1866. On May 1, 1881, Colton became proprietor of the Baltimore Gazette and purchased the paper from William H. Welsh. After three or four years, he sold the Baltimore Gazette. Colton wrote A Maryland Editor Abroad after his travels to Europe in 1880.

In 1892, Colton actively campaigned for Frank Brown for Maryland governor. After Brown's election, he was appointed a liquor license commissioner in Baltimore. He remained in that role until 1896. Towards the end of his life, Colton owned a poultry farm in Jessup, Maryland, where he had a collection of fowls. He also served as president of the Maryland Poultry Association.

== Personal life ==
Colton was a member of the Methodist Episcopal Church. He went by the nickname "Uncle George".

Colton married Lydia Jane Hamilton on September 25, 1842. They had five children: Wesley, Luther F., Hannah Moore, George Moore and Carrie Lee.

Colton suffered from vision loss and had surgery on his left eye. In December 1895, Colton took ill with malaria and afterward became temporarily blind. Colton died on May 4, 1898, at his home at 2027 North Charles Street in Baltimore. He was buried at Green Mount Cemetery in Baltimore.
