= Fairfax County Police Department =

Police department in Virginia, United States

- Flag of Fairfax County, Virginia
- Abbreviation: FCPD

Agency overview
- Formed: July 1, 1940; 86 years ago
- Employees: 2,098
- Annual budget: $217 million

Jurisdictional structure
- Operations jurisdiction: Fairfax, Virginia, U.S.
- Area: 407 square miles (1,050 km^{2})
- Population: 1,111,620
- General nature: Local civilian police

Operational structure
- Headquarters: 12000 Government Center Pkwy, Fairfax, Virginia, U.S.
- Police Officers: 1,495 authorized, approximately 1,300 operational
- Civilians: 368
- Agency executive: Kevin Davis, Chief of Police

Facilities
- Districts: 9
- Helicopters: 2 Bell 429

Website
- Official website

The Fairfax County Police Department (FCPD) is the primary law enforcement agency serving Fairfax County, Virginia. It is the largest municipal law enforcement agency in Virginia, serving over 1.16 million residents.

The FCPD is headquartered at 12099 Government Center Parkway in Fairfax, Virginia. The department divides Fairfax County into eight patrol districts. Other parts of the FCPD include the Major Crimes, Organized Crime and Intelligence, Cyber and Forensics, Operations Support Bureau, among other specialized parts.

== History ==
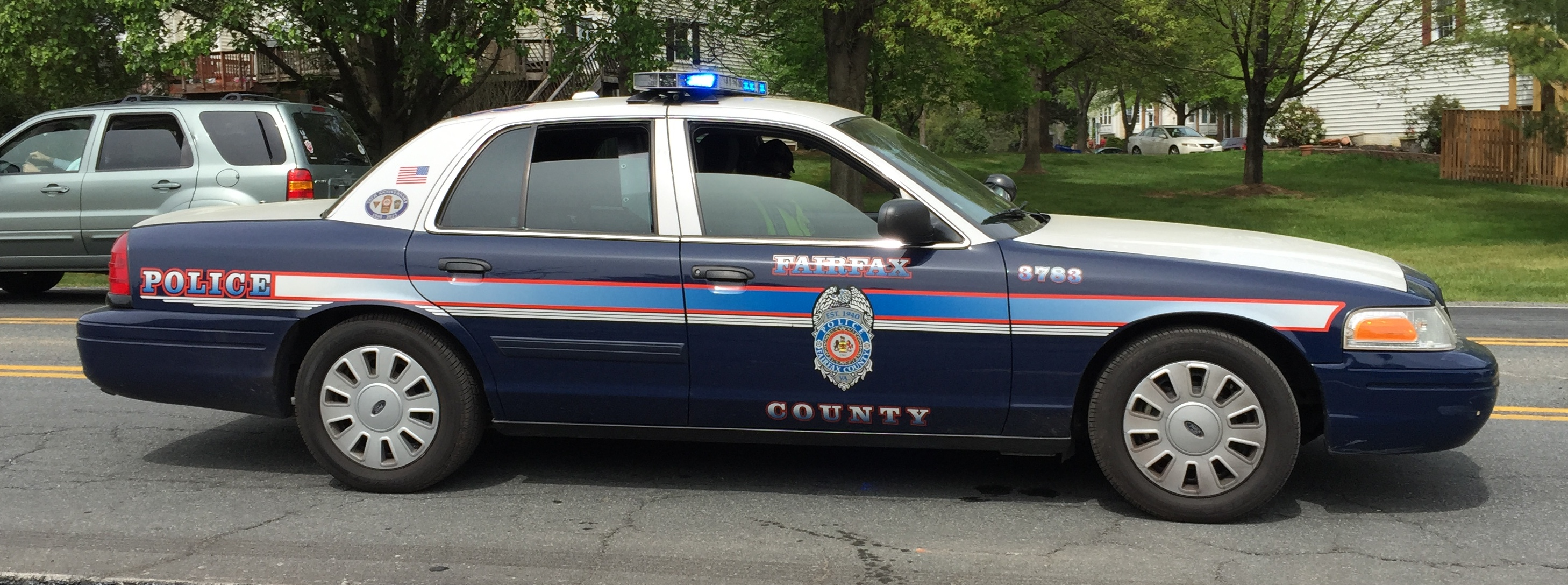
Fairfax County Police Department cruiser during road construction in 2016

In the 1920s, the Fairfax County Board of Supervisors began appointing road police, whose job it was to patrol the roads of Fairfax County and arrest traffic violators. In February 1932, the Board relinquished control of the county traffic police, and the four officers employed, Captain Haywood J. Durrer, Carl R. McIntosh, Louis L. Finks and Arthur W. Mills, became special officers and deputy sheriffs under Fairfax County Sheriff Eppa P. Kirby.

The Fairfax County Police Department came into existence July 1, 1940. Much of the credit for its establishment goes to the man who was then Fairfax County Sheriff, Eppa Kirby, a colorful character who never carried a gun. Overwhelmed with managing the inadequate county jail and law enforcement duties, Sheriff Kirby persuaded the Fairfax County Board of Supervisors to relieve him of his responsibilities for criminal police work by forming the police department. At the helm was Carl R. McIntosh, a deputy sheriff who became Fairfax County's first chief of police.

Chief McIntosh, five newly sworn police officers, and two clerks became the county's first police department employees. Three of the new officers were assigned to patrol the county's roads, while another was appointed detective sergeant. With far-reaching insight into what would eventually become one of the department's main areas of concern, Chief McIntosh appointed the fifth officer, John A. Millan as traffic sergeant on motorcycle patrol. Millan resigned shortly thereafter to accept a position as a revenue enforcement agent with the US Treasury Department's Prohibition Bureau.

A 1955 expansion authorized as part of the county budget allowed the creation of the department's juvenile bureau, headed by Detective David Eike, and its traffic division, headed by Lieutenant Lewis Shumate. Additionally, the department's detective bureau was consolidated at the FCPD headquarters in Fairfax under Lieutenant Grafton G. Wells and expanded with three new detectives.

William L. Durrer was appointed as acting chief of police in June 1957 by Fairfax County Executive Carlton C. Massey due to the illness of Chief McIntosh. Following Chief McIntosh's resignation in August, Durrer was appointed chief on October 30, 1957.

Joyce A. Harvell was sworn in as the FCPD's first female police officer in July 1957, working with the FCPD's Juvenile Bureau.

In July 1967, Christopher Stokes was hired as the department's first black policeman.

During the 2024 Paris Olympics, FCPD sent 12 officers and an explosive detection canine to help with security in Paris.

== Accreditation ==
The department achieved its third re-accreditation from the Virginia Law Enforcement Professional Standards Commission in June 2009. Fairfax County is the first police department in the Commonwealth of Virginia to accomplish this milestone.

== Organization ==
The current Chief of Police is Kevin Davis who was appointed on April 23, 2021. The three main commands within the department are Administration, Investigations, and Operations, each commanded by a Deputy Chief. The Internal Affairs Bureau, Public Affairs Bureau, and Community Engagement and Equity reports directly to the Chief. The Planning and Research Bureau is commanded by the Executive Deputy Chief.

I. The Investigations Command make up the primary investigative branch of the Department and is divided into specializations: Major Crimes (murder, sex crimes, assault, robbery, vehicle theft, financial crimes, and crimes against children), Organized Crime and Narcotics, Criminal Intelligence, and Investigative Support (crime scene, fingerprints, etc.).

II. The Administration Command contains the Fairfax County Criminal Justice Academy, the Administrative Services Bureau, and the Resource Management Bureau.

The Fairfax County Criminal Justice Academy trains recruits and prepares officers through constant, updated training and conducts the Citizen's Police Academy.

III. The Operations Command make up the vast majority of patrol officers that operate out of the nine district stations, which are as follows:

- Mason District
- McLean District
- Mount Vernon District
- Fair Oaks District
- Franconia District
- Reston District
- Sully District
- West Springfield District
- Lorton District

The Operations Command also contains the Operation Support Bureau which houses the Motorcycle Squad, SWAT, K-9 Section, Explosive Ordinance Disposal (EOD), and Helicopter Unit.

Officers in the Motor Section keep traffic moving and control traffic at major incidents and crash scenes. They rely almost exclusively on Harley-Davidson motorcycles to get to the source of traffic problems. Specially trained and certified officers assigned to the Motor Carrier Safety Section inspect trucks and commercial vehicles for safety and legal regulations. They can take unsafe vehicles off the roads; by placing them out of service. The Crash Reconstruction Unit provides technical expertise and has investigative responsibility for all fatal crashes. The Traffic Safety Services Section acts as the department's coordination point for all regional and departmental traffic enforcement and safety education programs. Traffic Enforcement Officers address parking issues.

Animal Protection Police officers are part of the Operations Command and are specially trained law enforcement officers who investigate dog bites and attacks and complaints of animal cruelty. They respond to emergencies involving sick or injured domestic and wild animals. They enforce county codes and state laws pertaining to animals. They remove strays from the community, often impounding them at the Fairfax County Animal Shelter where many can be reunited with their owners or adopted by new owners.

== Rank Structure and Organization ==
Rank	Insignia	Notes
Chief of Police		The Chief of Police is in charge of the department. The chief is appointed by the Fairfax County Board of Supervisors. Kevin Davis was appointed by the Board on April 23, 2021, after the previous chief retired, and took office on May 3.
Executive Assistant Chief		Second in command of the department, reporting directly to the Chief of Police.
Assistant Chief of Police		In charge of specific operational and support areas of the department.
Deputy Chief of Police		In charge of specific operational and support areas of the department.
Police Major		Commands, or serves as assistant commanders of district stations, divisions, and bureaus. Majors are in practice the commanders, and the Captains as assistant commanders.
Police Captain		Commands, or serves as assistant commanders of district stations, divisions, and bureaus. Majors are in practice the commanders, and the Captains as assistant commanders.
Police Second Lieutenant		Supervises a patrol shift within a district or serves as a staff officer.
Police Sergeant		A field supervisor who typically supervises 10-12 officers.
Non-supervisory positions
Master Police Officer		Master Police Officers are considered lead workers (note that MPO is considered a proficiency advancement and not a separate rank).
Police Officer II		Eligible for Master Police Officer distinction upon completion of five years of satisfactory service.
Police Officer I		Promotion to Police Officer II upon completion of two years of satisfactory service (roughly six months in the academy plus eighteen months of service).

=== Proposed Changes ===
In 2016 FCPD underwent an extensive "public safety review" process. The presentation released following the conclusion of the process recommended several changes in FCPD rank and organizational structure. Among the recommendations are:

- Phase out the Second Lieutenant rank as those officers retire or are promoted, eventually removing the rank altogether. First-line patrol supervision would be made up of two Sergeants per shift per district, each commanding squads of around 6 officers. A single Lieutenant rank would replace the two current lieutenant ranks.
- Second-line supervision would consist of four Lieutenants, two for day and two for night, in the district station, rather than the current system in which the district Captain and district First Lieutenant are responsible for all second-line supervision. The senior Lieutenant would serve as Assistant District Commander.
- A separate Recruit rank is suggested, which would be retained during the probationary period.
- Non-supervisory ranks (currently POI, POII, and MPO) would be altered to provide wider opportunities for career progression, with a rank similar to Corporal in other agencies being considered.
- The highest non-supervisory rank, currently Master Police Officer, would have the authority to act as a supervisor in the absence of a Sergeant or higher-ranking officer.
- Dedicated detective ranks, or pay grades, are suggested, rather than the current system in which officers are simply assigned to detective duties.

In early 2024, with no official announcement, FCPD made major changes to its rank structure, with the Chief of Police going from a colonel's insignia to 4 stars, the Executive Deputy Chief and Deputy Chiefs changing their titles to Executive Assistant Chief and Assistant Chief with three stars and two stars respectively, Major becoming Deputy Chiefs, First Lieutenants becoming Captains, and the rank of First Lieutenant being removed.

== Helicopter Division ==
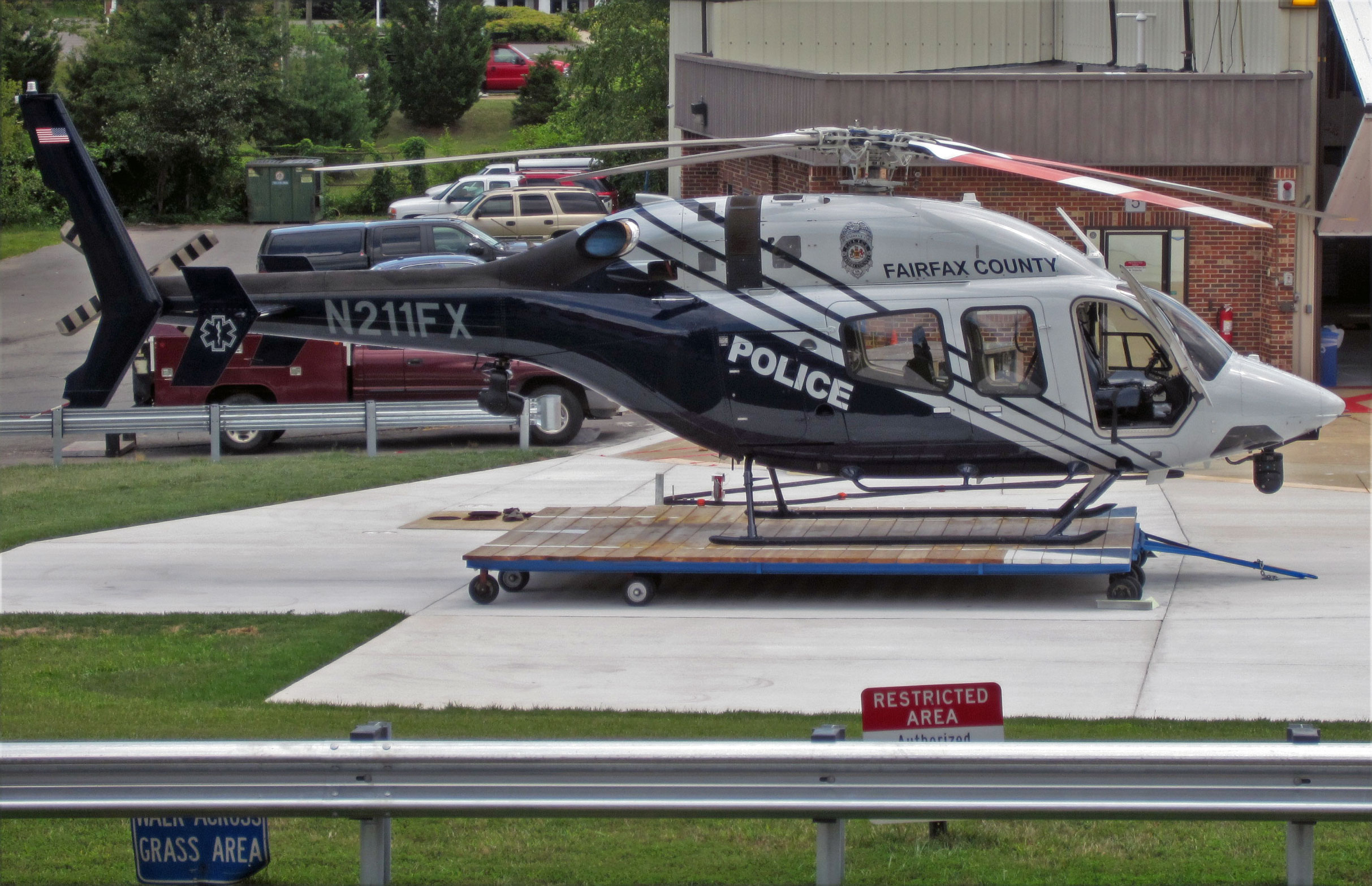
A police helicopter sitting on its pad

The Helicopter Division was initially formed in 1972 with the donation of an Enstrom F-28 helicopter by a local businessman. It suspended operation in 1975. In 1983, the Division was reformed as a full-time operation with two Bell 206 Jet Rangers. Formerly based out of Dulles Airport, it is now based out of the Fairfax County Fire and Rescue Training Academy on West Ox Road. It provided aeromedical transportation, traffic reporting and airborne law enforcement capabilities to the growing metropolitan area. The around the clock staffing consisting of a Pilot, Police Officer/Paramedic and a Flight Nurse from Inova Fairfax Hospital. In 1991, Inova Fairfax separated from the Helicopter Division at which time the Flight Nurse was replaced with a second Police Officer/Paramedic. This is the crew configuration with which the Helicopter Division still flies today. In 1997, the Division grew to a more capable and robust helicopter, the Bell 407. In 2011, the Division purchased its first Bell 429. The purchase of the Bell 429 made the Division the first multi-mission operator in the world to utilize this new airframe. Modern design characteristics of the Bell 429 allow adaptation to future missions needs, reduced/simplified maintenance, as well as improved longevity/service lifetime. Some of the highlights of the Bell 429 are twin engine redundancy, military grade sensors, night vision goggle technology and a lower noise signature which allow for safe and neighborly helicopter operations.

== Urbanization ==
The continued urbanization of the county creates additional impacts on the ability of the department to provide service to the community. The department is studying the impacts of the proposed redevelopment of Tysons Corner, and other projects throughout the county that will result in more transit-oriented land use patterns. As a result of preliminary impact assessments of ongoing and future development patterns in the county, the department anticipates a future need to create two new patrol districts, while realigning existing districts to accommodate the demands created by this anticipated growth. The Patrol Bureau is developing mechanisms for predicting the level of staffing that may be required in the future to meet these challenges while maintaining service quality.

== Equipment ==
Fairfax County Police carry the Glock 17 as their on-duty firearm.

Fairfax County Police drive the Ford Police Interceptor Sedan and Utility while on patrol. The department also possesses limited numbers of Dodge Chargers and Chevrolet Tahoe, Impala, and Caprice PPV vehicles, which are operated by some of the department's various specialty units. Fairfax County Police are also utilizing a 2023 Ford Mustang Mach-E as an electric vehicle concept, at this time they are only used for special events or recruiting.

Fairfax County Police Helicopter Division operates two Bell 429 GlobalRanger.

== Inside FCPD ==
Channel 16 is the Fairfax County local government-access cable television channel which delivers news and information about Fairfax County as well as Educational-access television programming. The Fairfax County Police Department has a 30-minute television show on Channel 16, which airs five times a week, titled 'Inside FCPD' which seeks to educate the public on the mission of the department and provide information on public safety.

== Programs ==
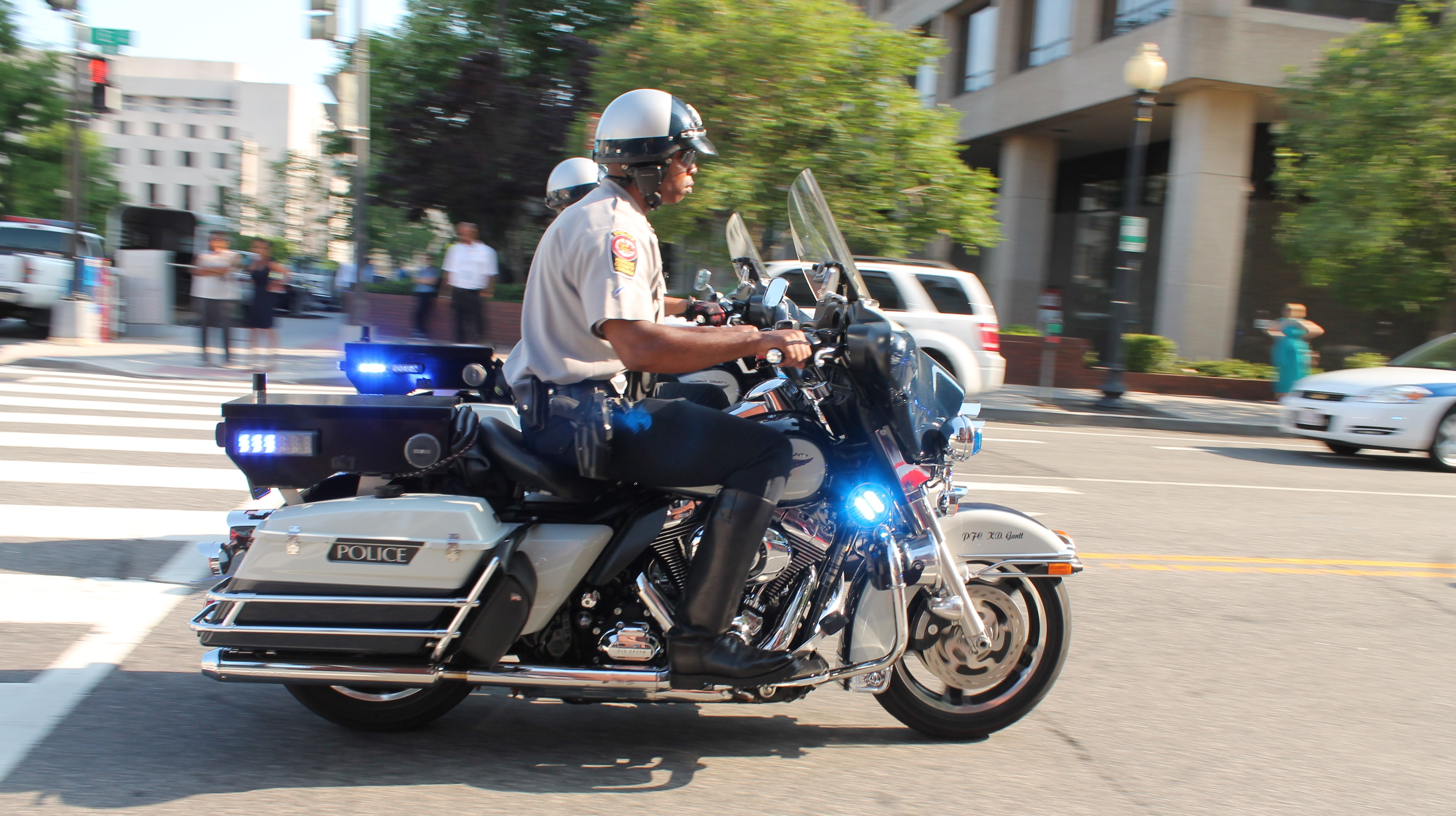
Fairfax County motorcycle officers in Washington, D.C., prior to a parade in 2014

Fairfax County Police has several programs that are ongoing and short-term, depending on the needs of the community. Some examples include

=== Animal Protection Police ===
Animal Control officers are specially trained law enforcement officers who investigate dog bites and attacks and complaints of animal cruelty. They respond to emergencies involving sick or injured domestic and wild animals. They're also tasked with enforcing county codes and state laws pertaining to animals. They remove strays from the community, often impounding them at the Fairfax County Animal Shelter where many can be reunited with their owners or adopted by new owners.

=== Attention to Senior Citizens ===
Seniors and Law Enforcement (SALT) is a joint program to address crime-related and public safety issues affecting seniors in the community. Franconia District crime prevention officers met with SALT council members on a monthly basis to discuss safety and emergency preparedness.

=== Communications ===
In 2008, the Public Information Office embraced new technology and new media to launch the department's messages to more members of the public. Taking advantage of the social networking phenomena, information was posted on Fairfax County's Facebook and Twitter accounts, which are monitored and maintained by the Office of Public Affairs. In addition, the police department started an FCPD YouTube site, posting informational and educational videos and information.

=== Honor Guard ===
Founded in 1980, the Ceremonial Honor Guard is a non-standing unit made up of career and auxiliary officers. It is one of the largest police Honor Guards in Virginia with 43 specially selected officers from the department's rank and file. Selection criteria include prior experience, professional image, uniform appearance, personal grooming standards, motivation, stature/bearing, interest in Honor Guard activities, and positive attitude. In 2008, they participated in 83 events and assignments and monthly practices to ensure their readiness at a moment's notice.

=== Public Safety Cadet Program ===
Young people between the ages of 14 and 21, male and female, with an interest in possible law enforcement careers fill the ranks of the Public Safety Cadet unit 1742, 2252, and 505. Active since 1975, the program supports the mission of the Fairfax County Police Department by providing volunteer support at police and community events. Unit 2252 was created in 2014 to serve the youth of the South County/Mt. Vernon Areas. Unit 505 is the newest being created in the fall of 2015 to serve central Fairfax. In addition to service, the Public Safety Cadets learn and compete in events testing some of the basic skills involved in a wide range of police assignments.

=== Road DAWG (Don't Associate With Gangs) ===
Increased gang activity across the region prompted growth in the number of Road DAWG camps in the county from one to three (at Mount Vernon, Reston and West Springfield Districts). The camp program was created to build healthy decision-making skills; help youths resist the draw of gangs and show them a fun and friendly side of police officers.

=== Soccer Program for At-Risk Youths ===
Members of Hispanic communities in the Franconia District and police officers came together to produce a series of soccer tournaments for kids between the ages of 7 and 16. The aim of "United for the Sport" is to build stronger relationships between the two. It continues today with the addition of human services, social services, and other county agencies.

== Fallen officers ==
Since the establishment of the Fairfax County Police Department, six officers and 2 K9s have died in the line of duty.

== Controversies ==
On August 29, 2013, John Geer was shot to death by Fairfax County Police Officer Adam Torres, after a 40-minute standoff. Geer was unarmed, but a gun was reportedly on the ground away from his body, as he stood inside the doorway of his Springfield, Virginia house. Geer had his hands raised in the air as he was shot. Geer's partner filed a lawsuit, and was settled in 2015 for $3 million. Torres was indicted on the charge of second degree murder on August 17, 2015, and turned himself in to authorities. Torres was scheduled to stand trial on April 18, 2016.

Several high profile and controversial officer-involved shootings, including the death of Geer, and one automobile accident where citizens were killed by Fairfax County police officers have led to calls for an independent review board to be appointed. On March 3, 2015, the Fairfax County Board of Supervisors established an ad hoc commission to review the police department's policies, practices, and programs regarding police-community relations, police-involved incidents, and public release of information. A report with recommendations from the commission was expected to be released in October 2015.
