= Leonard Hamm =

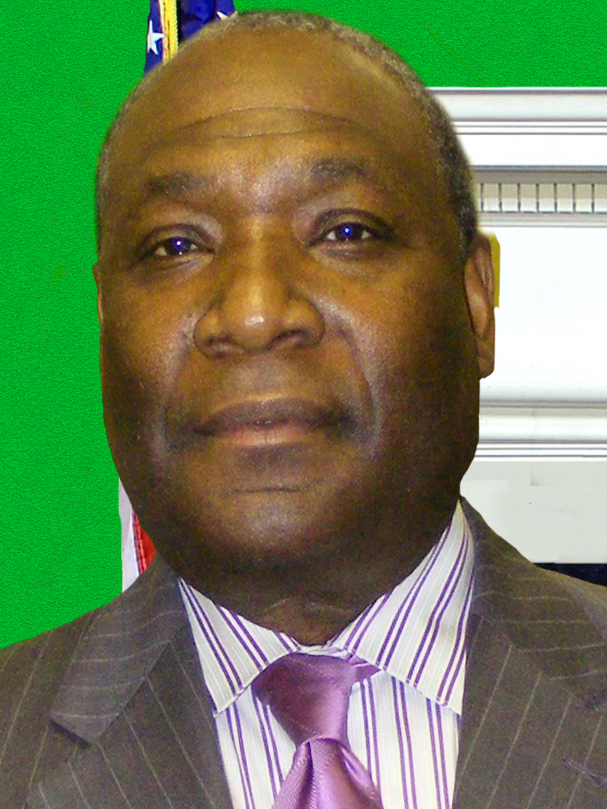
- Police career
- Country: United States
- Department: Baltimore Police Department
- Service years: 1974-2007
- Rank: Commissioner

Leonard Hamm is a former commissioner of the Baltimore Police Department who served as the head of the department from 2004 to 2007.

== Biography ==
Hamm grew up in Baltimore's Cherry Hill neighborhood, attended Baltimore City College and joined the department in 1974. He would eventually rise to the rank of Lieutenant and then Major under former commissioner Thomas Frazier, becoming the Baltimore Police Department's first African American officer to command the Central District. With a rising homicide rate, departmental personnel problems and a mayoral election approaching, Hamm was asked to resign by Mayor Sheila Dixon in the summer of 2007. Hamm was succeeded by Deputy Commissioner for Operations Frederick H. Bealefeld III, a 26-year veteran of the force. Hamm worked as the Chief of Campus Police at Coppin State University in Baltimore until June 2021.

In 2015 Hamm's memoirs were published, The Hamm Rules on Relationships, Leadership, Love and Community. http://www.hammrules.com/

== Family ==
In June 2008, it was discovered that Hamm's 39-year-old stepdaughter Nicole Sesker was found murdered in Northwest Baltimore. At the time of her death, she struggled with addiction and had also traded sex for housing, food, drugs and money. Sesker was a former volunteer and employee of Power Inside, a local women's group that assists women on the streets. Sesker used her experiences to inspire and educate others through media advocacy and public speaking. In 2004 she wrote, "I left prison with a made-up mind that I wouldn't be one of the ones that said something needs to be changed. I would help the changes be made. I would be, and am, a voice the public can't ignore.".

One of Hamm's grandsons, Malik Hamm is a linebacker for the Baltimore Ravens.

Police appointments
Preceded by Kevin P. Clark	Baltimore Police Department Commissioner; 2004-2007	Succeeded by Frederick H. Bealefeld III
