= Embassy of the United States, Port of Spain =

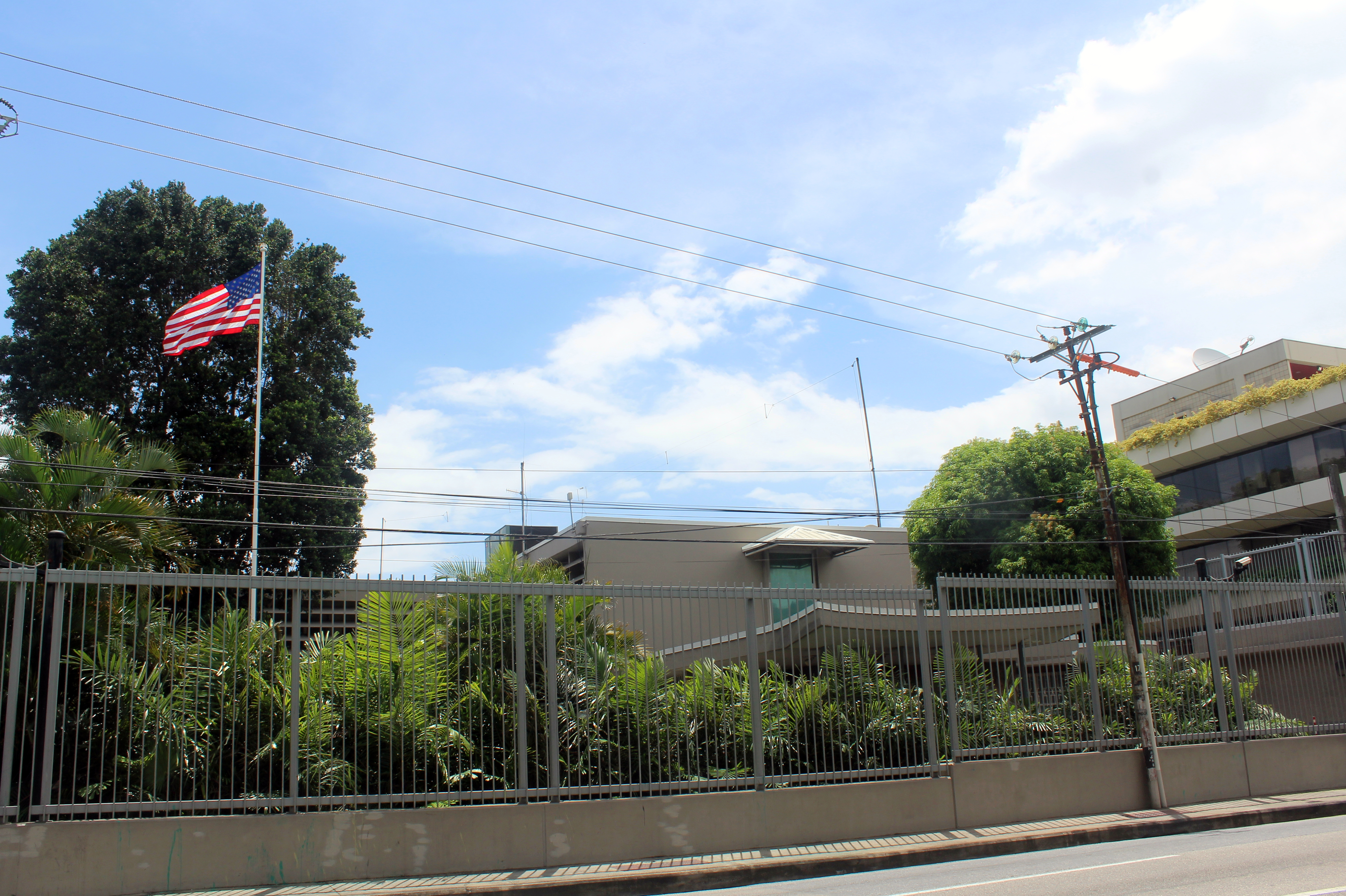
- Location: Port of Spain, Trinidad and Tobago
- Address: 15 Queen's Park W, Port of Spain, Trinidad & Tobago
- Coordinates: 10°39′58″N 61°31′1″W
- Website: https://tt.usembassy.gov

The Embassy of the United States in Port of Spain is the diplomatic mission of the United States of America in Trinidad and Tobago. Since the inception of diplomatic ties in 1962, Trinidad and Tobago has become one of the most industrialized nations in the English-speaking Caribbean. The embassy processes about 36,000 visa applications per year.

== History ==
On August 31, 1962, the United States recognized the newly independent Trinidad and Tobago and established the U.S. Embassy in Port of Spain the same day. Judge William Henry Hastie, serving on the U.S. Court of Appeals for the Third Circuit, led the U.S. delegation at the independence ceremonies. William H. Christensen was the first to hold the position as chargé d'affaires ad interim at the embassy. Following him, Robert G. Miner became the first U.S. ambassador to Trinidad and Tobago, presenting his credentials on December 1, 1962.

Football manager Jamaal Shabazz planned to approach the embassy for travel clearance in 2013 for the CONCACAF Gold Cup tournament to lift travel restrictions imposed on him for his involvement in an attempted coup in 1990.

== Relocation ==
On April 27, 2022, US Embassy officials and National Trust of Trinidad and Tobago officials visited the site of Trinidad Country Club in Maraval, drawing speculation that the US Embassy would buy the property. The following day, the US Embassy confirmed it was looking to relocate its embassy within Port of Spain. In May, as part of legal proceedings launched by minority shareholders of the Trinidad Country Club over the sale, Trinidad and Tobago Newsday reported that the Trinidad Country Club had been sold to the US Embassy for $316 million. In April 2023, the US Embassy and the seller hosted a signing ceremony at the site to finalize the purchase, with US ambassador Candace Bond stating that the US government would spend more than $400 million to construct the embassy. Bond announced that the 11-acre property would "showcase state-of-the-art and eco-friendly designs and materials".

== See also ==
- Embassy of Trinidad and Tobago, Washington, D.C.
- List of ambassadors of the United States to Trinidad and Tobago
- Trinidad and Tobago–United States relations
