= Greetings & Readings =

Coordinates: 39.4982°N 76.6556°W

Greetings & Readings of Hunt Valley
- Type: Family business
- Industry: Retail (Specialty)
- Founded: Hunt Valley, Maryland, U.S.
- Headquarters: 118-AA Shawan Rd; Hunt Valley, MD, U.S.
- Key people: Steven Baum, President; Stephen Spund, Vice-President
- Number of employees: 90 (2018)
- Website: http://www.greetingsandreadings.com

Greetings & Readings of Hunt Valley was the largest independent bookstore in Baltimore and was a member of the American Booksellers Association. The store occupied 30,000 square feet (2,800 m^{2}) of retail and warehouse space on the second floor of the main Hunt Valley Towne Centre plaza, the final northbound destination of the Baltimore Light Rail, before closing in January 2019.

== History ==
Phyllis and Norton Baum founded the original Greetings & Readings in 1969 as a book and card shop occupying 1,800 square feet (170 m^{2}).

For 35 years, the store was located in Towson, Maryland, in the Loch Raven Plaza. After its closure, a new store was opened by Phyllis and Norton's son, Steven Baum; his wife Fran; his brother-in-law Stephen Spund and Spund's wife Amy. Greetings & Readings of Hunt Valley opened in August 2005 in the newly rebuilt Hunt Valley Towne Centre with a 30,000-square-foot (2,800 m^{2}), second floor location along the plaza's Main Street.

Greetings & Readings was named one of the coolest businesses in Baltimore by Expert Market US.

In January, 2010, wedding technology company WeddingWire, selected Greetings & Readings of Hunt Valley to receive the 2010 Bride’s Choice Awards™ for excellence in custom printing and personalized wedding invitation design. The invitation department was closed in 2018 to make room for expanding card and baby gift departments. The store hosted frequent book signings and other events including kids' story time readings.

The store closed in January 2019, citing a drop in sales and customers lost to online booksellers.

== Community involvement ==
Greetings & Readings of Hunt Valley supported the efforts of the non-profit organization Literacy Works, Inc. which promotes increased literacy for adults in the Baltimore area. The store also partnered with the HELPS (Health Educators Linking Parents and Students) Coalition and sponsored the Hunt Valley Kids Club, which began in May 2007.

From 2013, Greetings & Readings of Hunt Valley partnered with Baltimore's Enoch Pratt Free Library as the on-site bookseller for some of the library's public and private author events.
