= Lawrason Riggs =

American businessman, civic leader, and collector of old master prints

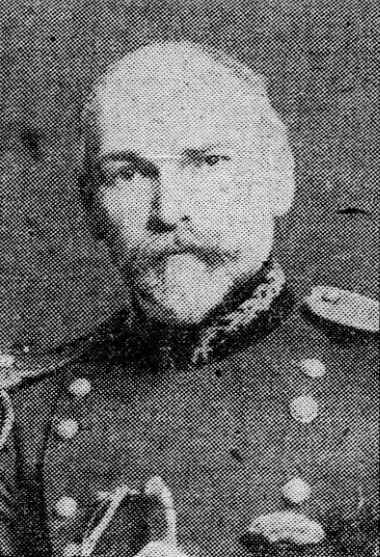
Photograph of Riggs, c. 1906

Lawrason Riggs (October 17, 1861 – November 22, 1940) was an American businessman, civic leader, and collector of old master prints, active in Baltimore.

== Biography ==
Lawrason Riggs was born on October 17, 1861, in New York to Lawrason Riggs and his third wife Mary Turpin Bright Riggs as the eldest of ten children. When Riggs was six years old, the family relocated to Maryland, where they had ties dating back to the seventeenth century. In 1883, Riggs received his Bachelor of Arts degree from Princeton University and in 1886 obtained a law degree from the University of Maryland. Riggs also completed post-graduate work in history and political science at Johns Hopkins University. Although Riggs was trained as an attorney, he never practiced law. He served as the director of the First National Bank, Mercantile Trust Company, National Mechanic's Bank, and American Bonding Company. Riggs died on November 22, 1940, and was buried in Green Mount Cemetery.

== Civic leadership ==
Riggs participated in civic affairs in a number of capacities. He joined the Fifth Regiment of the Maryland National Guard in which he was rapidly promoted to the position of Brigadier General due to his leadership in the Great Baltimore Fire in 1904. Riggs was a dedicated member of the Maryland Historical Society, served as president of the Board of Trustees of the Maryland Training School for Boys, was part of the School Board and Family Welfare Association, presided over a three-man Police Board, and chaired The Municipal Affairs Committee of the Baltimore Association of Commerce. Riggs, who had a close family connection to George Peabody, was a member of the inaugural Board of Trustees of the Peabody Institute on which he served for forty-three years. He was a founding member of the Baltimore Museum of Art (BMA), for which he advocated for a municipal museum in the City-Wide Congress Committee (1911–1914), acted as one of the eight incorporators in 1914, and served on the first Board of Trustees. Riggs was instrumental in finding a permanent location for the BMA and bought the Carroll-Thomas mansion at 101 West Monument Street in 1925 that served as the museum until the present building designed by John Russell Pope was completed in 1929. Throughout the 1930s, Riggs contributed funds to pay the salary of the museum director and helped sponsor exhibitions. He often promoted the museum by lending pieces from his own collection to exhibits.

== President James Buchanan ==
Lawrason Riggs and his brother, E. Francis Riggs, were two of the initial four trustees for the James Buchanan Monument Fund. The fund, which was endowed with $100,000 from the will of Buchanan's niece, Harriet Lane Johnston, was created for the purpose of establishing two monuments to the 15th President of the United States. By the time the monuments were actually created, Lawrason Riggs was the sole remaining trustee. He was responsible for the acquisition of Stony Batter, the small Pennsylvania property where Buchanan was born. At that location, a memorial pyramid was raised in 1907 and the entire property deeded to the Commonwealth of Pennsylvania in 1911. Riggs was also responsible for the erection of a monument to President Buchanan in Washington, D.C., which was enagled by the passing of a resolution on June 18, 1918. The Washington memorial to Buchanan was finally unveiled on June 26, 1930.

== Art collection ==
Riggs was an avid collector of Chinese porcelain and prints. His print collection, which included prints from the late fifteenth through twentieth centuries, was given to the Baltimore Museum of Art as a permanent loan by two of Riggs's brothers in 1941 and was formally accession by the institution in 1943. The two most-represented artists in the collection are Albrecht Dürer and Rembrandt, but many printmakers from America, England, the Netherlands, France, China, Japan, and Italy are also represented. Riggs's criteria for his collection included the notoriety of the artist, quality of the print, and beauty. Lawrason Riggs tended to purchase his prints through the dealers, among them being: Fitz Ray Carrington, Arthur H. Harlow & Co., Frederic K. Kepel & Co., Anderson Galleries, R. Ederheimer, Scott & Fowles Co., and Rudolf Seckel. Riggs has a particularly close relationship with art dealer F. Meader, who not only helped Riggs locate works but also assisted in restoring and framing prints.
