= Ronald L. Daniel =

Commissioner of the Baltimore Police Department in 2000

Commissioner of the Baltimore Police Department
- In office January 3, 2000 – March 30, 2000
- Preceded by: Rotation (acting)
- Succeeded by: Ed Norris

Personal details
- Born: 1948 or 1949 (age 76–77)
- Children: 2
- Education: Johns Hopkins University; Morgan State University
- Police career
- Department: Baltimore Police Department
- Service years: 1973–2000

Ronald L. Daniel (born 1948 or 1949) is an American police officer who served as commissioner of the Baltimore Police Department from January to March 2000. He resigned after 88 days in office, making him the shortest-serving commissioner in the department's history.

== Early life ==
Daniel was born in 1948 or 1949 and grew up in West Baltimore. He graduated from Baltimore City College in 1967, received a degree in business development from Johns Hopkins University, and was a pre-medical major at Morgan State University.

== Career ==
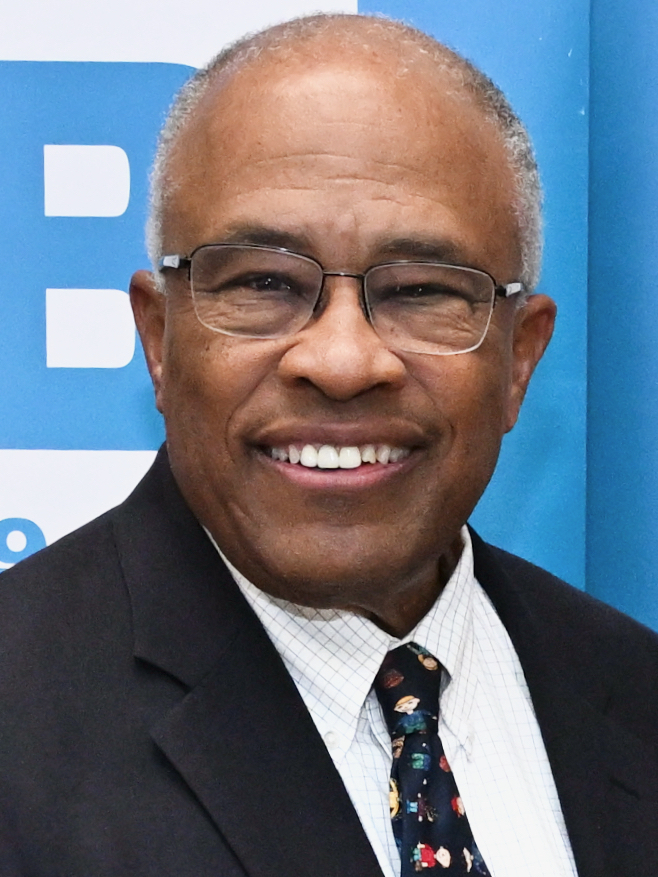
Mayor Kurt Schmoke intervened to restore Daniel after he was suspended by police commissioner Thomas C. Frazier.

Daniel was recruited to the Baltimore Police Department in 1973, attending the FBI National Academy after joining the department. He received a bronze star from the department in 1977 for apprehending two armed robbery suspects. According to The Baltimore Sun, he held "more than a dozen posts", ultimately being promoted from major to colonel in 1994 by commissioner Thomas C. Frazier, becoming head of the criminal investigation division later the same year. He became chief of the field operations bureau, the second-in-command at the department, in 1996, serving alongside future acting commissioner John E. Gavrilis.

Frazier suspended Daniel in 1997 following a comment at a Vanguard Justice Society meeting implying that Frazier should be fired if he did not address "internal racism" in the department, accusing him of "insubordination" and that his comments amounted to advocating "an overthrow of the government". This caused a revolt by 13 high-ranking members of the Vanguard Justice Society and calls for Frazier's resignation. Frazier's supporters described the revolt as an attempted coup d'état. Mayor Kurt Schmoke intervened to restore Daniel, the first time the mayor publicly reversed a major decision by a commissioner.

Daniel became commissioner on January 3, 2000.

While commissioner, Daniel and O'Malley argued over how to fight crime, with the latter twice stating his impatience with Daniel over being slow to fight crime and disagreeing with advisors appointed by O'Malley. The advisors suggested 87 reforms, half of which Daniel declined.

Daniel resigned on March 30, 2000, having served 88 days in office. According to The Baltimore Sun, his resignation surprised his top aides.

== Personal life ==
As of 1997, Daniel was married with two sons, living in Anne Arundel County.

Police appointments
Preceded by Rotation (acting)	Commissioner of the Baltimore Police Department; 2000	Succeeded by Ed Norris
