= Police lieutenant =

Police rank

A police lieutenant is a level 4 police rank in some police departments, such as the French National Police, the Netherlands Royal Marechaussee, the Philippine National Police, the Police of Russia, the National Police of Ukraine, the Estonian Police and Border Guard Board, the Police of Armenia, the Militsiya of the Republic of Belarus, the Federal Police of Germany, the Vietnam People's Public Security, the Spain Civil Guard, the Royal Thai Police, the Buenos Aires Provincial Police, the Mossos d'Esquadra, the Sûreté du Québec, and various law enforcement agencies in the United States.

== By country ==
=== France ===
Shoulder straps of a French police lieutenant.

France uses the rank of lieutenant for management duties in both uniformed and plain-clothed policing. The rank comes senior to lieutenant intern and junior to capitaine.

This rank was previously known as inspecteur for plain-clothed officers, and officier de la paix for officers in uniform.

=== Philippines ===
Philippine National Police insignia for Police Lieutenant

In the Philippines, the rank of a police lieutenant is equivalent to an inspector based on the original Philippine National Police rank under the Republic Act 6975. It has existed since 2019. It was lower than a police captain.

=== United Kingdom ===
In the United Kingdom, the approximate equivalent rank of a police lieutenant is that of inspector.

=== United States ===
Rank insignia for a typical U.S. police lieutenant, consisting of one golden bar (identical to that of a U.S. Army lieutenant) on a white shirt. Some U.S. police departments use a silver-colored bar as well as a variety of shirt colors.

In most U.S. police departments, the rank of lieutenant is immediately above that of sergeant. A police lieutenant is often the deputy officer in charge of a precinct.

In some smaller police departments, a person holding the rank of police lieutenant may be in charge of a division (patrol division, detective division, etc.) within that department. In larger police departments, a police lieutenant may command only one section of a precinct which is commanded by either a police captain, police major, police inspector, or the next highest rank. A police lieutenant is considered senior management in most large urban police departments. Unlike a lieutenant in the military, who is typically a recent inductee, police lieutenants typically have many years of experience in their field prior to attaining the rank.

==== New York ====
In the New York City Police Department, the rank of lieutenant is immediately below police captain. Lieutenants are usually veterans with extensive experience.

==== Boston ====
In the Boston Police Department, there are ranks of lieutenant and lieutenant detective.

== See also ==
- Lieutenant
