= Northern Virginia Magazine =

Monthly magazine for Northern Virginia and Washington DC, United States

- Editor: Amy Ayres
- Categories: Regional magazine
- Frequency: monthly
- Circulation: Total readership of 130,000+
- Publisher: Darin Baird
- Founder: Sang Yang
- First issue: February 2006
- Company: Metro Media Marketing, Inc.
- Country: United States
- Based in: Chantilly, Virginia, USA
- Language: English
- Website: https://www.northernvirginiamag.com
- OCLC: 69660950

Northern Virginia Magazine is a monthly magazine for the Northern Virginia region and the Washington, D.C. metropolitan area.

The magazine published its first issue in 2006. It focuses on dining, shopping, travel, entertainment, news, culture, and personalities in the Northern Virginia area and frequently produces "best of" lists, including the annual Best of NoVA and Best Restaurants lists and top professionals lists, such as Top Doctors, Top Dentists, and Top Financial Professionals.

== Editorial content ==
As of February 2023, the magazine is divided into six departments: NoVA Now, Datebook, Features, Home & Design, Taste, and Last Look.

NoVA Now and Datebook are at the front of the magazine. NoVA Now features news, culture, and style stories from Northern Virginia. Datebook contains upcoming events.

Features are in the middle of the publication and include a range of topics from Northern Virginia notables to politics, in-depth looks at news affecting the region, travel itineraries and ideas, and "Best of" lists.

Home & Design is in the back of the magazine and contains interior decorating tips, stories and photos of recently renovated homes in the region, and expert interviews.

Taste features in-depth restaurant reviews by the magazine's food writers and critics, including Alice Levitt.

Last Look, on the last page of the magazine, and features a Q&A with an important person from Northern Virginia.

Daily editorial content is available online at the magazine's website covering culture, food, style, home, family, health, and things to do.

== Circulation ==
Northern Virginia Magazine has a readership of 135,000+ each month and is published 12 times a year. The magazine has won 14 Virginia Press Association

== Leadership ==
As of May 2022, the editor of Northern Virginia Magazine is Amy Ayres.

Northern Virginia Magazine's CEO is Sang Yang and the president and publisher is Darin Baird.
