= Oakland shooting =

Oakland shooting may refer to:

- 1999 drive-by shooting spree by Mervin Ray Hughes
- 2009 killing of Oscar Grant
- 2009 shootings of Oakland police officers
- 2012 Oikos University shooting
- 2020 Oakland–Ben Lomond shootings, one of which was a shooting that occurred in Oakland
- 2022 Oakland school shooting
