= Anthony Batts =

American police chief (born 1960)

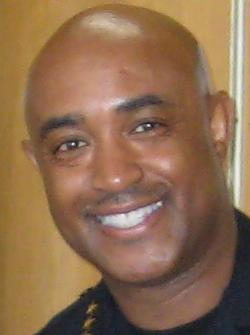
- Batts as Chief of the Oakland Police Department

Commissioner of the Baltimore Police Department
- In office September 27, 2012 – July 8, 2015
- Preceded by: Frederick H. Bealefeld III
- Succeeded by: Kevin Davis

Chief of the Oakland Police Department
- In office 2009 – October 2011
- Preceded by: Wayne Tucker
- Succeeded by: Howard Jordan

Chief of the Long Beach Police Department
- In office 2002 – October 2009

Personal details
- Born: 1960 (age 65–66) Washington, D.C., U.S.

Military service
- Years of service: 2002–2015
- Rank: Chief of Police

Anthony W. Batts (born 1960) is an American law enforcement officer who served as the chief of three different police departments in the United States: the Long Beach Police Department, the Oakland Police Department, and the Baltimore Police Department.

== Early life and education ==
Batts was born in Washington, D.C., and lived there until he was five years old, when his family relocated to San Francisco, and several years later, to Los Angeles. He grew up in South Los Angeles.

Batts has earned a Doctorate in Public Administration, a Master of Business Management, and a Bachelor of Science in Law Enforcement Administration.

== Career ==
=== 2000s ===
Batts was chief of police for the Californian cities of Oakland and Long Beach. He worked in the Long Beach Police Department for 27 years, rising to Chief of Police in 2002. Under Batts, homicides decreased by 45%, and overall crime decreased by 13% in Long Beach. The drop in the violent crime rate in the city was the lowest in nearly 40 years. He led the police department for seven years.

In 2006, while serving as chief of police in Long Beach, Batts became embroiled in "lobstergate": three officers reported colleagues for fishing for lobsters while on duty. Batts allegedly called the reporting officers "malcontents" and forced them into a variety of undesirable assignments in retribution; Batts denied the allegations. The officers sued the City of Long Beach in 2008 and were awarded $1 million each by a jury. Batts left the Long Beach PD shortly afterward.

Batts has stated that he was motivated to seek the Oakland Chief of Police position by the aftermath of the killing of four Oakland police officers in March 2009. He was appointed Chief of Police in late 2009. In mid-2011, Batts applied to the San Jose Police Department without informing the Mayor of his intention to leave. Having lost the confidence of both the Mayor and the rank-and-file officers, he resigned in October 2011.

=== 2010s ===
After a brief period in a research position at Harvard, Batts became the police commissioner of the Baltimore Police Department on September 27, 2012. During his tenure in Baltimore, his team implemented reforms that led to dramatic reductions in all metrics used to assess police performance, including declines in all Part I crime statistics, excessive force complaints, and citizen grievances.

On December 23, 2014, Batts was named in a lawsuit filed by a whistleblower from the Baltimore Police Department for failing to protect the officer from retaliation after reporting severe police brutality. The lawsuit was settled on June 1, 2016, after Batts was dismissed, with the officer receiving a $42,000 settlement.

On July 8, 2015, Batts was dismissed from his position as Baltimore Police Commissioner in the aftermath of a spike in homicide rates following the 2015 Baltimore riots. Reports also cited the controversial handling of the Freddie Gray case as a factor leading to his removal. Gray died in police custody.

Batts has received numerous awards and commendations for heroism, crime reduction, community activism, and innovative programs. These include the California State University Long Beach Alumni of the Year, Boy Scouts of America Distinguished Citizen Award in Long Beach and Oakland, and Leadership Long Beach Alumnus of the Year. Batts was also honored by the Anti-Defamation League for his community outreach efforts to combat antisemitism, bigotry, and other forms of intolerance. He has served on various boards, including the Long Beach Memorial Hospital Board of Trustees, the Board of Governors for Long Beach City College, the Board of Directors for the Boy Scouts of America, and the Long Beach Children's Clinic.

Since 2016, Batts has served as an instructor at the FBI-Law Enforcement Executive Development Association.

== Personal life ==
Batts's former wife is Laura Richardson, a Californian Democrat and former member of the United States House of Representatives.

Police appointments
Preceded by Wayne Tucker	Chief of the Oakland Police Department; 2009–2011	Succeeded by Howard Jordan
Preceded by Frederick H. Bealefeld III	Baltimore Police Department Commissioner; 2012–2015	Succeeded by Kevin Davis
