= Crime in Oakland, California =

Oakland
- Crime rates* (2018)

Violent crimes
- Homicide: 16.2
- Rape: 163.4^{**}
- Robbery: 609.9
- Aggravated assault: 543.4
- Total violent crime: 1273.7

Property crimes
- Burglary: 556.4
- Larceny-theft: 3655.0
- Motor vehicle theft: 1178.7
- Arson: 56.94
- Total property crime: 5390.1
- Note: Reported crimes per 100,000 population Source: FBI 2018 UCR data

Crime in Oakland, California is among the highest in the United States. Crime began to rise during the late 1960s, and by the end of the 1970s Oakland's per capita murder rate had risen to twice that of San Francisco or New York City. In 1983, the National Journal referred to Oakland as the "1983 crime capital" of the San Francisco Bay Area. Crime continued to escalate during the 1980s and 1990s, and during the first decade of the 21st century Oakland has consistently been listed as one of the most dangerous large cities in the United States.

The number of Oakland homicides peaked in 1992, when there were 175 homicides. From the period 1987 to 2012, crime declined significantly, but the city continued to struggle with persistently high rates of homicide and violent crime, fluctuating over time.

Among Oakland's 35 police patrol beats, violent crime remains a serious problem in specific East and West Oakland neighborhoods. In 2008, homicides were disproportionately concentrated: 72% occurred in three City Council districts, District 3 in West Oakland and Districts 6 and 7 in East Oakland, even though these districts represent only 44% of Oakland's residents.

In 2021, the Oakland City Council, in a controversial decision, voted 7-2 to redirect $17.4 million in funding from the Oakland Police Department to the Department of Violence Prevention.

== Homicide rates ==
Oakland Homicides by Year (Note: The homicide rate is not the same as murder rate. Murders are a subset of homicides. In 2000, for instance, there were 109 homicides in Oakland, of which 102 were classified as murders; similarly in 2018, there were 75 homicides: 68 murders and 7 categorized as justifiable homicides or killings in self-defense.)
Year	Homicides
1992	175
1995	153
1996	102
2000	85
2001	87
2002	113
2003	114
2004	88
2005	94
2006	148
2007	127
2008	125
2009	110
2010	95
2011	110
2012	131
2013	92
2014	86
2015	83
2016	85
2017	72
2018	75
2019	78
2020	109
2021	134
2022	120
2023	126
2024	86
2025	67

The rate at which Oakland Police Department homicide investigations were successfully solved (the "clearance rate") was 42% in 2009, 30% in 2010, and 29% in 2011, much lower than the California statewide rate of 63.8%. A 2012 article in the East Bay Times attributed the low clearance rate in part due to understaffing of the police department and in part to the management dysfunction at the police department, and stated that "In a city where police officers consume more than 40 percent of the municipal budget, are among the city's highest-paid employees, and have exerted an outsized influence on Oakland politics, the department's ability to perform its core missions — solve violent crime, catch criminals, and keep the public safe — is highly questionable." Crime experts said that the city's low homicide clearance rate undermined efforts to control violence. The Oakland Police Department (OPD) had 14 homicide detectives in 2010 and nine homicide detectives in 2011. A 2007 report by the Urban Strategies Council found than more than 80% of homicide victims in Oakland from 2001 to 2006 were male, and that over the five years, an average of 77% of homicide victims and 64.7% of homicide suspects were African Americans.

== Crime dynamics ==
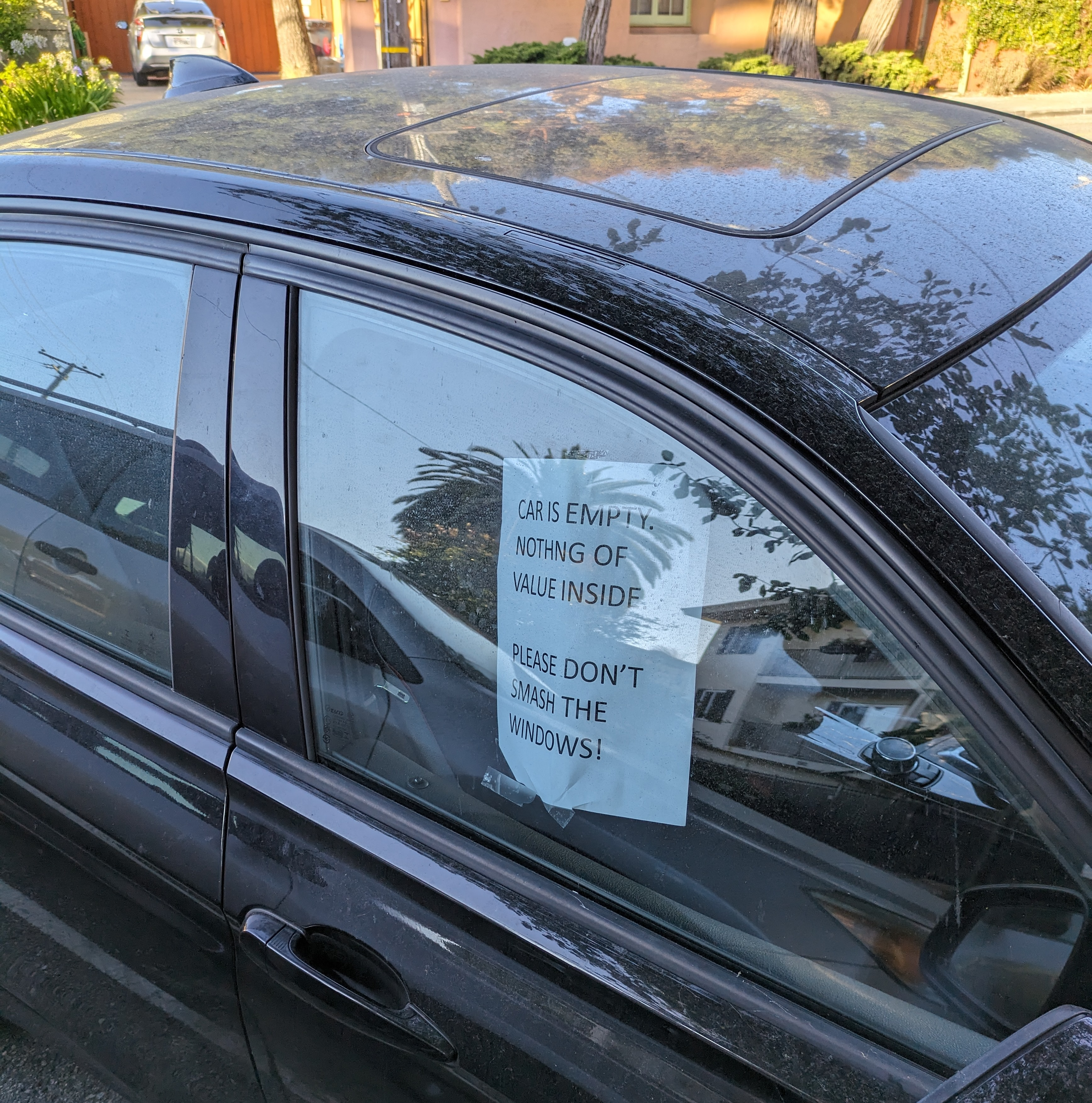
A parked car in Oakland with a sign asking would-be thieves not to smash the windows

Total crime in Oakland dropped by 41% from 1987 to 2012. In 2012, Oakland had the highest total crime rate of any California city with 20,000 or more people, with 8,587 total crimes per 100,000 residents, compared to a statewide average of 3,182 total crimes per 100,000 people. Property crime in Oakland declined by 58% between 1988 and 2009, increased from 2009 to 2012 (a period when the property crime rate remained stable in comparable cities and statewide).

Robbery rates in Oakland declined by 60% in the seven years between 1993 and 2000, but thereafter increased, more than doubling between 2000 and 2012. In 2012, there was one robbery per 91 residents, the highest rate in the United States. Carjackings occur two to three times more frequently in Oakland than in other cities of comparable size, and police have recorded at least one reported carjacking in every Oakland neighborhood; in 2005–2007, there were 884 carjackings in Oakland and 334 carjackings in San Francisco, despite San Francisco having about twice as many residents as Oakland.

Crime against the city's taco truck vendors in the Fruitvale district came under scrutiny after the killing of a vendor's 5-year-old son in December 2011. Some truck vendors responded by hiring armed security guards, citing continual robberies and ineffective police response times.

In 2021, the Oakland City Council, in a controversial decision, voted 7-2 to redirect $17.4 million in funding from the Oakland Police Department to the Department of Violence Prevention. Councilwomen Nikki Fortunato Bas and Carroll Fife were the main advocates for the budget change to "employ violence interrupters and community ambassadors in flatland neighborhoods". Oakland Mayor Libby Shaaf criticized the cuts to the police department, saying it would result in the loss of 50 officers and cut funding to police academies.

As of 2023, Oakland was dealing with a crime wave in the aftermath of the COVID-19 pandemic, with its overall crime rate up 86 percent since 2003, violent crime up 150 percent since 2003, and property crime up 72 percent since 2003. In 2023, Oakland had the highest number of car thefts in over 20 years, with a rate of about one car stolen for every 27 residents. In contrast, San Francisco's overall crime rate in 2023 had increased by only 2 percent over the 2003 level, while San Jose's overall crime rate had decreased by 12 percent from the 2003 level.

== Operation Ceasefire ==
In 2013, Oakland implemented a gang violence reduction plan used previously in other cities, Operation Ceasefire, based on the research and strategies of author David M. Kennedy.

== Domain Awareness Center ==
The Domain Awareness Center (DAC) is a joint project between the Port of Oakland and the city. Planning started in 2009 as part of a nationwide initiative to secure ports by connecting motion sensors and cameras in and around the shipping facilities. In 2013, the Oakland DAC integrated 130 cameras from the Port of Oakland and four city cameras. By including gunshot detection and license plate readers the DAC would allow police to faster investigate suspects (which does not exactly equal the alleged shift from "reactive to proactive" crime treatment).

== Oakland Police Department ==
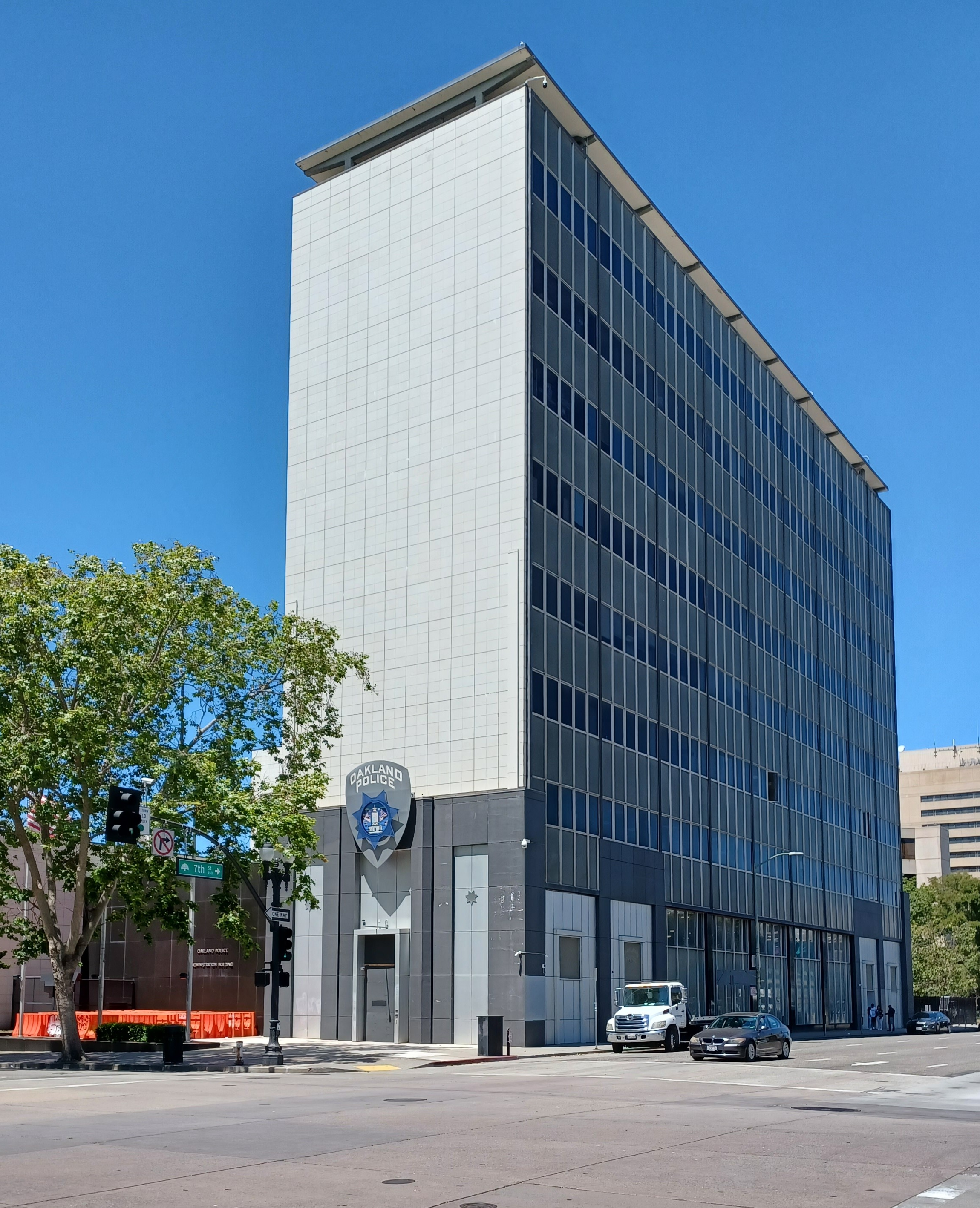
Oakland Police Department

=== Community relations issues ===
The Oakland Riders scandal involved a group of corrupt Oakland police officers who made false arrests, falsified evidence, and engaged in brutality. In 2003, the city settled more than 100 "Riders" allegations in a settlement approaching $11 million. Over 2001 to 2011 as a whole, the City of Oakland paid about $57 million "for claims, lawsuits and settlements involving alleged misconduct by the Oakland Police Department"—the most of any city in California, and more than double what San Francisco paid out over the same period, even though San Francisco has more than double the population of Oakland. Thereafter, under federal court supervision, the city has undertaken reforms of its police department, although critics say that "the fundamental character of the police department remains hostile to the community and overly reliant on force."

A 2020 report by the UC Berkeley School of Law's International Human Rights Law Clinic, Living with Impunity: Unsolved Murders in Oakland and the Human Rights Impact on Victims' Family Members, criticized the OPD's interactions with the families of homicide victims, writing that the department had failed to make victim services available to the family members of victims; that "law enforcement's treatment of family members at critical moments—during death notification, at the crime scene, and during the subsequent investigation—often generated mistrust, frustration, and stigma"; and that Oakland police made arrests in approximately 40% of Oakland homicides involving black victims, but approximately 80% of homicides involving white victims.

In 2013, fewer than 9% of Oakland police officers were city residents.

=== Number of officers ===
The number of OPD officers has varied over time: there were 626 officers in 1996, 814 in 2002, 793 officers or more than 800 officers in 2009, 626 officers in 2012, and 723 officers at the end of 2015.

The city's strategic plan recommended 925 officers, and an independent study commissioned by the city in the mid-1990s recommended 1,200 officers.

The Chauncey Bailey Project wrote in 2008 that detective caseload for OPD was more than any other major city in California, except Fresno, and that, in that year, the Police Department had the lowest homicide clearance rate among California's large cities because the department is understaffed and the detective work in certain instances is not as thorough because there are simply not enough officers.

=== 2008 unlawful arrest lawsuit ===
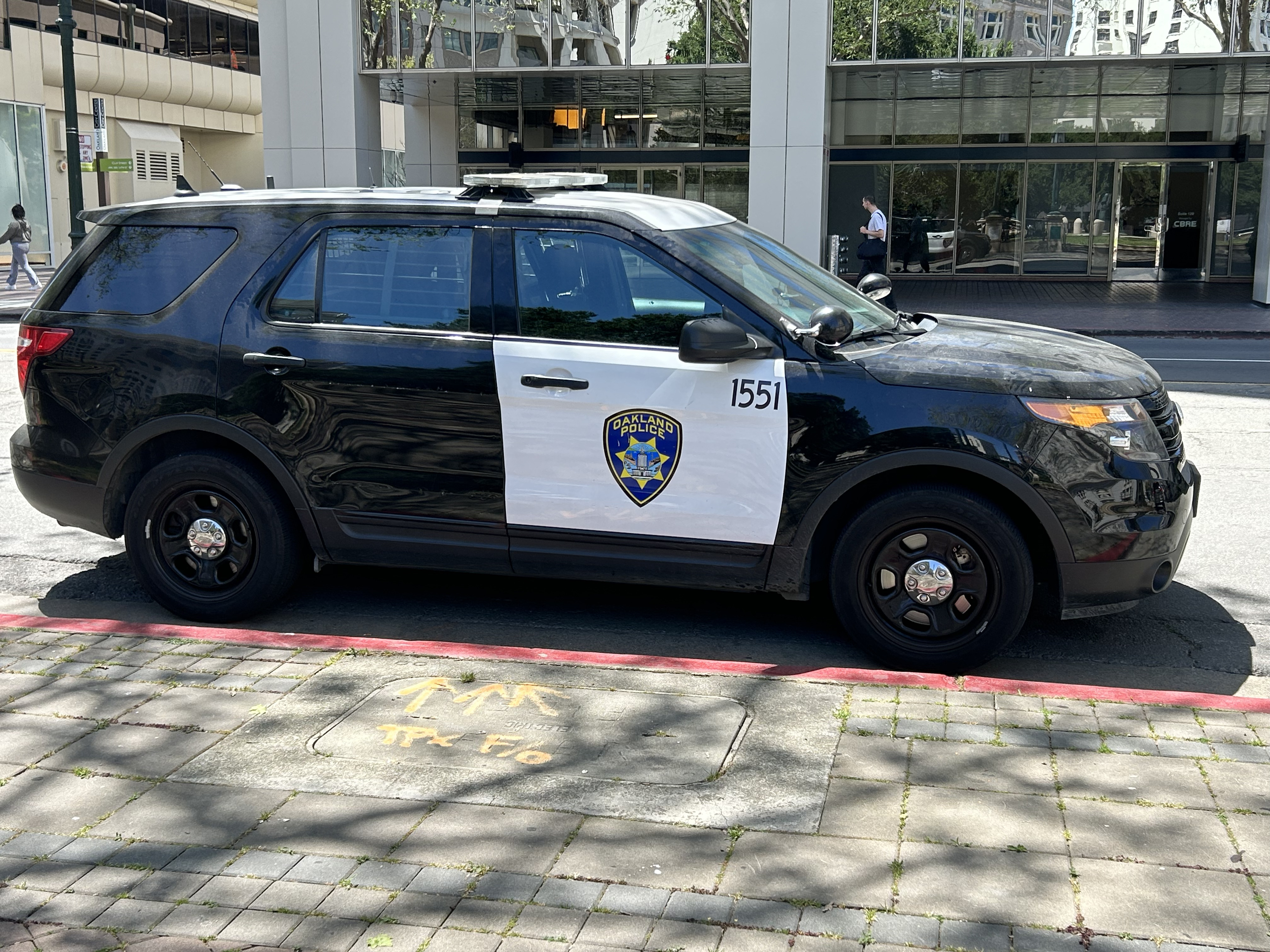
Oakland Police Department Squad Car

In 2008, a federal jury awarded $6,058,000 in damages to Torry Smith and Patricia Gray after Oakland police unlawfully broke into their home and falsely accused Smith of possessing a firearm, causing his wrongful imprisonment for four and a half months. The officers involved falsely claimed that they had a warrant, said Smith was linked to an alleged drug lord, and planted an assault rifle to justify Smith’s arrest. Charges against Smith and Gray were dismissed several times due to lack of evidence.

Civil rights attorney John L. Burriss represented Smith and Gray for unlawful arrest, unlawful detention, and unlawful entry. The jury ruled in their favor, awarding Smith and Gray a judgment of over $6 million for emotional distress, statutory, and punitive damages. The court later reduced the total award to $3,601,800, saying the original amount was "grossly excessive". The defendants later appealed the verdict.

== High profile crimes ==
=== 2000s ===
- September 2004 - 16-year-old Greshanda Williams was killed in Martin Luther King Jr. Way with an assault rifle.
- September 2006 - Two women were killed in a drive-by shooting. The shooting occurred at Martin Luther King Jr. Way in West Oakland.
- March 2009 - Lovelle Mixon killed four police officers.

=== 2010s ===
- July 2013 - Alaysha Carradine, age 8, was killed by Darnell Williams Jr., who was given the death penalty in 2016.

=== 2020s ===
- March 2021 - 75-year-old Pak Ho was murdered during a robbery.
- November 2021 - 1-year-old Jasper Wu was killed in an Oakland freeway shooting.
- August 2022 - 60-year-old Lili Xu was murdered near 5th Avenue and East 11th Street during a robbery.
- August 2022 - A triple homicide occurred in Martin Luther King Jr. Way in West Oakland. Three men died at the scene.
- September 2022 - 2022 Oakland school shooting: Six people were shot and wounded near several high schools in East Oakland. One victim died in November.
- October 2022 - 2022 Oakland party shooting: two teenage brothers, aged 15 and 17, were fatally shot and two others were wounded.
- January 2023 - 35-year-old Lamar Converse was murdered by a 17-year-old. The Alameda County District Attorney's Office kept the case in Juvenile Court and the offender was sentenced to up to seven years in the Juvenile Justice Center.
- December 2023 - 36-year-old Officer Tuan Le was shot and killed during an undercover burglary operation.
- November 2025 - John Beam was murdered at Laney College and a suspect was arrested the next day.
- February 2026 - A pair of dismembered limbs and torso belonging to a single unidentified decedent were found in two separate locations In East Oakland. Homicide is suspected.

== See also ==
- Oakland gang injunctions
