= 2025 New Orleans truck attack =

Terrorist attack in Louisiana, U.S.

- CCTV recording of pedestrians avoiding the truck
- Location: 29°57′22″N 90°4′4.4″W; Bourbon Street, New Orleans, Louisiana, U.S.
- Date: January 1, 2025; 22 months ago 3:15 – 3:17 a.m. CST (UTC-6)
- Target: Pedestrians
- Attack type: Vehicle-ramming attack; mass murder; domestic terrorism; Islamic terrorism; shootout; attempted bombing
- Weapons: Ford F-150 Lightning pickup truck; .308 AR-10 semi-automatic rifle; Glock semi-automatic pistol; Two pipe bombs (unused)
- Deaths: 15 (including the perpetrator)
- Injuries: 57 (52 by vehicle-ramming, 5 by gunfire)
- Perpetrator: Shamsud-Din Bahar Jabbar
- Motive: Islamic extremism inspired by the Islamic State

On January 1, 2025, an Islamist domestic terrorist attack occurred when Shamsud-Din Jabbar, a 42-year-old African-American Muslim man, rammed a pickup truck into a crowd on Bourbon Street in New Orleans, Louisiana, then exited the truck and engaged in a shootout with police before being fatally shot. Fourteen victims were killed, plus the perpetrator, and at least fifty-seven others were injured, including two police officers who were shot. The attack occurred during New Year celebrations in the city, which was scheduled to host the 2025 Sugar Bowl later that day. The malfunctioning anti-ramming bollards had been removed for upgrades in preparation for Super Bowl LIX.

The assailant was a resident of Houston, Texas, and drove from there to New Orleans. An Islamic State (ISIS) flag was found in the truck used in the killings, and Jabbar had posted videos declaring allegiance to ISIS in the preceding hours. The Federal Bureau of Investigation (FBI) determined that Jabbar had been inspired by ISIS, but investigated the matter as domestic terrorism, since there was no evidence of foreign involvement in the attack. It is the worst vehicle ramming attack in United States history, surpassing the 2017 New York City truck attack.

== Background ==
Federal law enforcement and intelligence agencies had warned local police agencies about potential vehicle-ramming attacks before the holidays. In a 2017 memo, the city government also noted the risks of a mass casualty incident, including from a vehicle attack in the French Quarter, and it had plans to increase security in the area. In that same year, the city government acquired a set of L-shaped temporary Archer vehicle barriers from Meridian Rapid Defense Group and used them to help secure the city's Mardi Gras parade against vehicle attacks. The city spent $250,000 to purchase a set of 45 Archer barriers. A subsequent security assessment by Interfor International for the French Quarter Management District in 2019 stated concerns that the bollards did "not appear to work", and when assessing security vulnerabilities on Bourbon Street, stated that "the two modes of terror attack likely to be used are vehicular ramming and active shooting".

American officials were concerned about the potential for lone wolf attacks and efforts by the Islamic State's Khorasan branch to recruit new members by spreading propaganda online and radicalizing vulnerable populations.

The New Year celebrations in the city included parties on Bourbon Street and a parade for the 2025 Sugar Bowl, one of New Orleans's major sporting events, which was scheduled to take place on the night of January 1 at Caesars Superdome between the Georgia Bulldogs and the Notre Dame Fighting Irish. Law enforcement had increased security in preparation for these events, including the use of drones in the French Quarter. The bollards in New Orleans, that were often malfunctioning, were removed to be replaced in preparation for the Super Bowl LIX on February 9.

== Attack ==
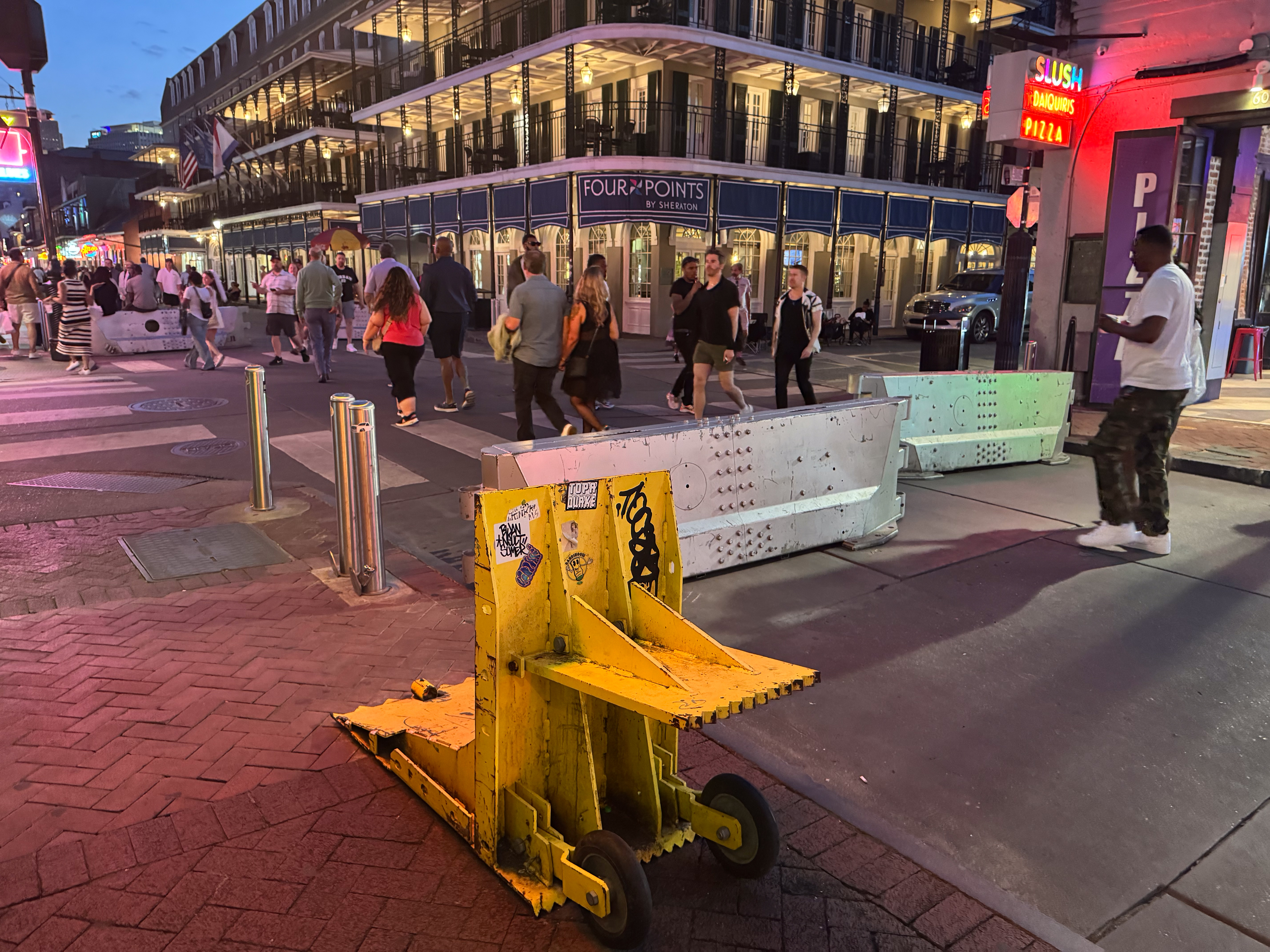
Yellow Archer barrier in May 2025

After exiting traffic, the perpetrator, Shamsud-Din Bahar Jabbar, drove the truck onto the sidewalk to bypass a police SUV and other barricades that had been placed to protect Bourbon Street. Eyewitnesses reported that steel barricades installed to prevent vehicular access were not raised before the attack, though New Orleans Police Department superintendent Anne Kirkpatrick said that police were aware they malfunctioned sometimes and instead used other barricades. Jabbar drove into people along a three-block stretch between Canal and Conti streets. Kirkpatrick stated the suspect was "trying to run over as many people as he possibly could".

After crashing into an aerial work platform, Jabbar exited the truck and began shooting a gun. New Orleans police officers returned fire and killed Jabbar by four shots to the torso. Jabbar wounded two police officers in the gunfight.

Jabbar wore body armor during the attack. Police officers recovered a .308 AR-10 rifle and Glock handgun. (Note: Attributed to multiple sources.) The white Ford F-150 Lightning light-duty truck used in the attack had been rented using Turo, and had been observed in Humble, Texas, on the morning before the attack. Later that day, the truck was observed in Baytown, Texas, heading east on Interstate 10 toward New Orleans. The truck was registered to a Houston man. There was an Islamic State (ISIS) flag in the vehicle, and on January 9, 2025, newspaper Al-Naba claimed responsibility for the attack.

The New Orleans PD, along with Mayor LaToya Cantrell, described the incident as a terrorist attack. Jason Williams, the district attorney for Orleans Parish, said that "driving a vehicle into a crowd is not particularly a thing that any law enforcement agency can be prepared for".

The city had previously deployed permanent bollards to stop cars from entering the French Quarter, but they had frequently malfunctioned. The bollards were removed and were being replaced in advance of the upcoming Sugar Bowl when the attack occurred. The city still had temporary Archer vehicle barriers acquired back in 2017 but did not deploy them until after the attack had already occurred. Kirkpatrick was unaware that the city had them until after the attack.

=== Timeline ===
- December 30, 2024
  - Jabbar rented a Ford F-150 Lightning pickup truck in Houston.
- December 31, 2024
  - Jabbar purchased one of the coolers that would be used to store one of his IEDs at a store in Texas
  - Morning: Jabbar began driving east from Houston to Louisiana
  - 2:30 p.m.: Jabbar arrived in Louisiana
  - 9:00 p.m.: Jabbar's vehicle was spotted in Gonzales, Louisiana
  - 10:00 p.m.: Jabbar unloaded his truck in front of his rental house
- January 1, 2025
  - 12:41 a.m.: Jabbar walked to Royal and Governor Nichols Street after parking his truck
  - 1:29–3:02 a.m.: Jabbar posted five videos on Facebook, and gave a final will and testament.
  - 1:53 a.m.: Jabbar planted the first IED inside of a cooler at Bourbon Street near St. Peter Street
  - Jabbar returned to his truck to retrieve the second IED which was in a different type of cooler
  - 2:20 a.m.: Jabbar planted the second IED at Bourbon and Toulouse Streets. Both areas where the IEDs were placed were located in the French Quarter.
  - 3:15 a.m.: Jabbar drove down Canal Street before evading a traffic barricade and turning onto Bourbon Street, where he ran over dozens of pedestrians.
  - 3:17 a.m.: Jabbar exited the truck and shot at responding police officers before being killed by police returning gunfire in a shootout.
  - Shortly after 5 a.m.: A fire was reported in Jabbar's rental home
  - 4:03 p.m.: The Sugar Bowl announced the game would be rescheduled to January 2.
- January 2, 2025
  - 2–8 a.m.: Officials begin cleaning Bourbon Street at 2:00 a.m. and finish at 8:00 a.m.
  - Around 1:00 p.m.: Bourbon Street reopens to pedestrians.

== Aftermath ==
A reunification center was established at University Medical Center New Orleans. Many hotels in the area were evacuated, and hospitality and service workers reporting for work later that morning were turned away from the area. The 2025 Sugar Bowl, which is part of the 2024–25 College Football Playoff, was to be played at Caesars Superdome between Notre Dame and Georgia at 7:45 p.m. CST on January 1; after the attack, it was postponed to 3 p.m. CST the following day due to ongoing security sweeps. Security for the game was tightened, and the game went on without any incident. Local organizers said they would review security procedures for Super Bowl LIX to be held in New Orleans in February 2025.

The New Orleans City Hall building was closed to the public on January 2 to reduce traffic. A moment of silence honoring the victims of the attack was held before the start of the Sugar Bowl. The victims, as well as first responders, were also honored before the kickoff of Super Bowl LIX. Members of the Bech and Tenedorio families flipped the ceremonial coin to end the ceremonies.

== Victims ==
Fourteen people, excluding the suspect, were killed. All of the deceased victims died of blunt force injuries. At least fifty-seven others were injured, including three people and two New Orleans police officers who were shot in a shootout. Immediately after the attack, emergency personnel took thirty of the wounded to five area hospitals, while other injured sought hospital care on their own. Mexico's foreign ministry reported that two Mexican nationals were injured in the attack. Israel's foreign ministry said two Israeli citizens were wounded in the attack.

Victims Killed

- Kareem Badawi, 18
- Martin “Tiger” Bech, 27
- Andrew Dauphin, 26
- Nikyra Cheyenne Dedeaux, 18
- Billy DiMaio, 25
- Hubert Gauthreaux, 21
- Reggie Hunter, 37
- Terrence Kennedy, 63
- Nicole Perez, 27
- Edward Pettifer, 31
- LaTasha Polk, 47
- Brandon Taylor, 43
- Matthew Tenedorio, 25
- Elliot Wilkinson, 40

— Sources:

By January 5, the names of all fourteen deceased victims were released. There were eleven men and three women, ranging in age from 18 to 63. All were killed by blunt force injuries. Two were local to New Orleans: LaTasha Polk, 47, and 63-year-old Terrence Kennedy. Six further fatalities resided in Louisiana: Kareem Badawi, 18; Hubert Gauthreaux, 21; Reggie Hunter, 37; Nicole Perez, 27; Brandon Taylor, 43; and Elliot Wilkinson, 40. Martin "Tiger" Bech, 27, was a native of Louisiana but resided in New York City, and was the brother of NFL player Jack Bech. All but one of the remaining victims were from elsewhere in the United States: Andrew Dauphin, 26; Nikyra Dedeaux, 18; William DiMaio, 25; and Matthew Tenedorio, 25. The final victim was British national Edward Pettifer, 31, from Chelsea, London, the stepson of Alexandra "Tiggy" Pettifer, a former nanny of the princes William and Harry.

== Perpetrator ==
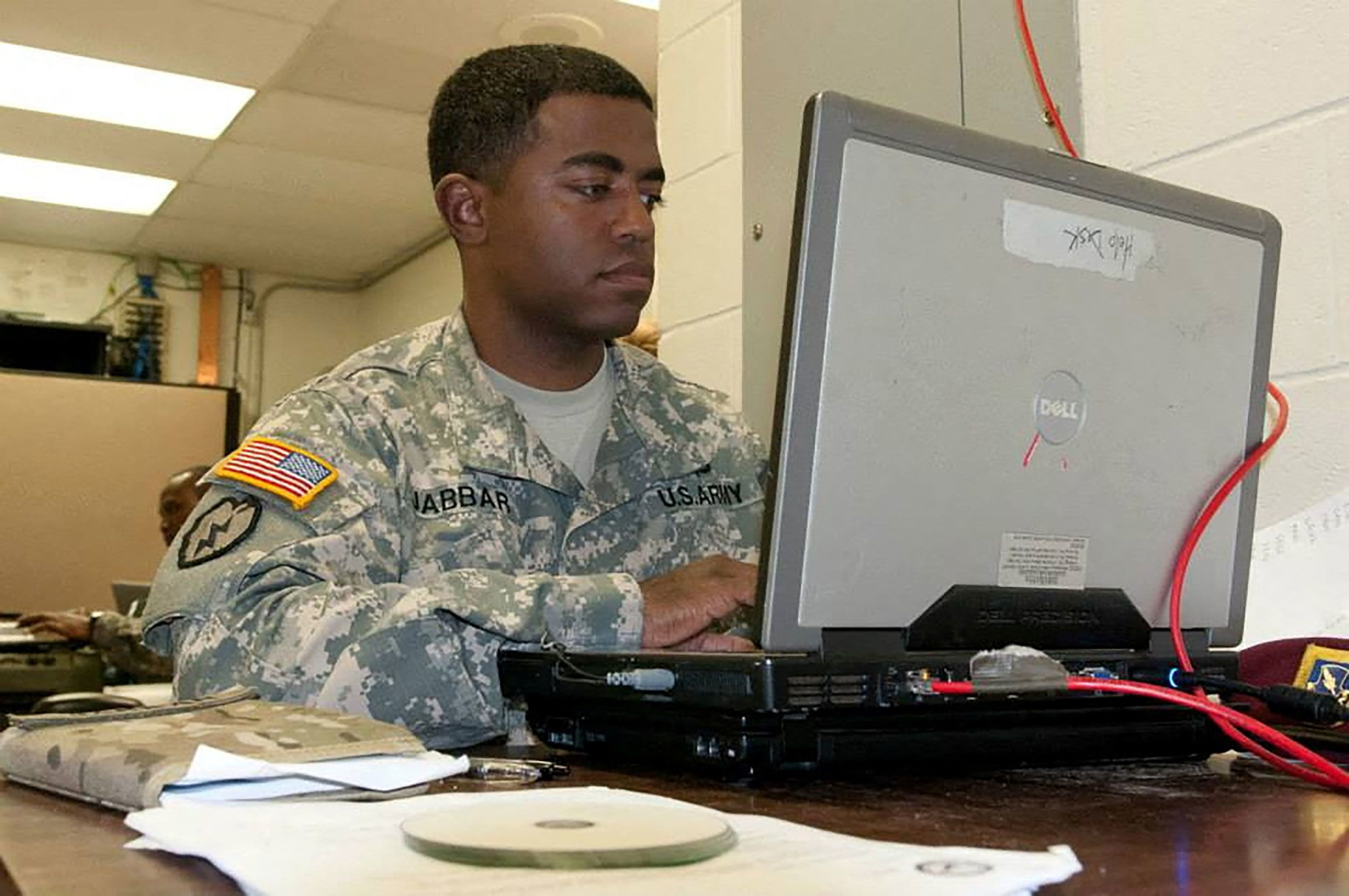
Jabbar serving as the information technology team chief for the 82nd Airborne Division's 1st Brigade Combat Team during his Army service, pictured in 2013 at Fort Polk.

The assailant, Shamsud-Din Bahar Jabbar (October 26, 1982 – January 1, 2025), was 42 years old and absent from all federal watchlists. He was born and raised in Beaumont, Texas, a city located 85 miles (137 km) east of Houston. At the time of the attack, he lived in a Houston neighborhood in northern Harris County. Although raised as a Christian, he converted to Islam, and his brother, Abdur Jabbar, said he was a "Muslim for most of his life."

Jabbar came from an African American family that predominantly attended the local Baptist church. His father, a convert to Islam born in Houston, changed his surname from Young to Jabbar; his mother remained a Christian. His grandfather moved from Louisiana to Texas as part of a migration of Creoles of color to the Beaumont area for work. Jabbar was arrested in 2002 in Katy for misdemeanor theft and was arrested in 2005 for driving with an invalid license. In 2014, he pleaded guilty to driving under the influence while serving at Fort Bragg in North Carolina.

Jabbar served in the United States Army for ten years as a human resources specialist and an information technology specialist. He was deployed to Afghanistan from February 2009 to January 2010. He was honorably discharged at the rank of staff sergeant. He left active duty in 2015, and was in the United States Army Reserve until 2020. He enrolled at Georgia State University in 2015 and graduated in 2017, receiving a Bachelor of Business Administration in computer information systems. Jabbar partied and used alcohol in college, causing his grades to slip, and lost a scholarship. Despite Jabbar's growing interest in Islam, his acquaintances saw no signs of extremism.

Jabbar was divorced three times and had financial problems. His first marriage ended in divorce in 2012, and he was married twice more, from 2013 to 2016 and from 2017 to 2022. He secured a job at Deloitte in 2021 as a "senior solutions specialist" in government and public services with a yearly salary of $120,000, a quarter of which was spent in alimony and child support. The husband of one of his ex-wives said that Jabbar had been behaving unpredictably in the months before the attack, seemingly motivated by his religious views, and the couple decided to limit Jabbar's contact with their children.

In 2024, Jabbar moved to a Muslim community north of Houston, where he isolated himself, and started publishing recordings to SoundCloud, in which he espoused conservative religious views. In the recordings, Jabbar condemned music as a gateway "into the things that God had made forbidden to us" such as alcohol and marijuana. In an early 2024 recording, he said that "the voice of Satan spreading among Prophet Muhammad's followers [...] is a sign of the end times." He was not seen attending either of the two nearby mosques and was not a formal member of any of the Islamic Society of Greater Houston's 21 congregations. It is unclear exactly what factors influenced Jabbar's radicalization, although investigators said that his views became significantly more extreme after the beginning of the Gaza war in 2023. Jabbar traveled alone to Cairo, Egypt in late June 2023, spending eleven days in the country, followed by a three-day stay in Ontario in mid-July; U.S. investigators are probing what Jabbar did while abroad.

In videos posted to Facebook between 1:29 and 3:02 a.m., immediately before the truck attack, Jabbar pledged allegiance (bay'at) to ISIS. He said he wanted his act to highlight the "war between the believers and the disbelievers" and that he had considered organizing a family "celebration" where he would have them "witness the killing of the apostates."

The FBI said it was confident that Jabbar acted alone. While Jabbar took violent inspiration from ISIS, investigators have not found evidence he had received any direct contact or direction from the terrorist group. Possible self-radicalization reflects a pattern seen in previous jihadist attacks.

== Investigation ==
The FBI is leading the investigation of the attack and has opened a tip line. Investigators found two pipe bombs inside coolers on Bourbon Street a few blocks from the attack. The devices were rigged for detonation and connected to a wireless remote found in the truck. The bombs were reportedly rudimentary and rigged with shrapnel, such as nails, screws and tacks. The bombs were also meant to be detonated with an electric match and consisted of RDX. The FBI described Jabbar's bombs as "crude" and made with a "lack of experience" due to his choice of not using a detonator for his RDX bombs.

A handgun and a long gun with a homemade suppressor were also found at the scene. Law enforcement is investigating whether Jabbar illegally acquired the weapons. The Bureau of Alcohol, Tobacco, Firearms and Explosives, the Department of Homeland Security, and prosecutors for the National Security Division and the local federal prosecutor's office are assisting in the investigation. After an urgent search by the ATF, it was concluded that the rifle was obtained legally through a transaction with an individual in Arlington, Texas, on November 19, 2024. The origins of the handgun are still under investigation. The FBI has inquired as to whether Jabbar was connected to or inspired by a foreign terrorist organization; Jabbar discussed the Islamic State (IS), his divorce and a desire to kill his family in videos he recorded while driving from Texas to New Orleans. Jabbar posted five videos on his Facebook account between 1:29 a.m. and 3:02 a.m. before initiating his attack at around 3:15 a.m. The FBI said that apparent explosive devices were found elsewhere in the French Quarter; authorities believed those may have been placed by someone other than the driver, but the FBI later confirmed that Jabbar acted alone. On January 3, the FBI seized material for making explosives while raiding Jabbar's home in Houston. Later, the FBI stated that Jabbar was wearing Meta smart glasses when he started the attack at 3:15 a.m., but did not record the attack or attempt to livestream it.

The FBI said that Jabbar was "100% inspired by ISIS" and that it was a premeditated act of terrorism. On January 4, the deputy assistant director of the FBI's counterintelligence division said that investigators "do not assess at this point that anyone else is involved in this attack except Shamsud-Din Jabbar." Initially, investigators believed that Jabbar had accomplices, based on New Orleans police's initial review of surveillance video, in which several people stood near potential explosive devices. However, after reviewing the videos further investigators concluded that Jabbar himself planted the improvised bombs and that the people later seen standing near them were not connected "in any way" to Jabbar's attack.

A fire broke out the same day of the attack at an Airbnb in the St. Roch neighborhood, which investigators believe Jabbar rented. The Bureau of Alcohol, Tobacco, Firearms and Explosives said that it believes Jabbar attempted to destroy evidence of his crimes by setting a small fire in the hallway of his house, and by placing accelerants in multiple rooms, but that the fire burned itself out before spreading and reaching accelerants in the house. The New Orleans Fire Department extinguished the fire, preventing significant damage to the building and allowing investigators to seize materials for making explosives and other evidence left behind by Jabbar.

The same day, at approximately 8:39 a.m., a Tesla Cybertruck exploded and caught fire outside of the Trump International Hotel Las Vegas in Paradise, Nevada, killing the perpetrator and injuring seven other people. The perpetrator of the Las Vegas explosion rented it from the Turo app like Jabbar and both reportedly served at the same military base. The FBI stated that there is "no definitive link" between the New Orleans truck attack and the Las Vegas explosion.

During a law enforcement raid of Jabbar's house in North Houston, a man surrendered and was taken into custody. However, the FBI later stated that no arrests were made there and that they believed Jabbar had acted alone.

== Reactions ==
=== Domestic ===
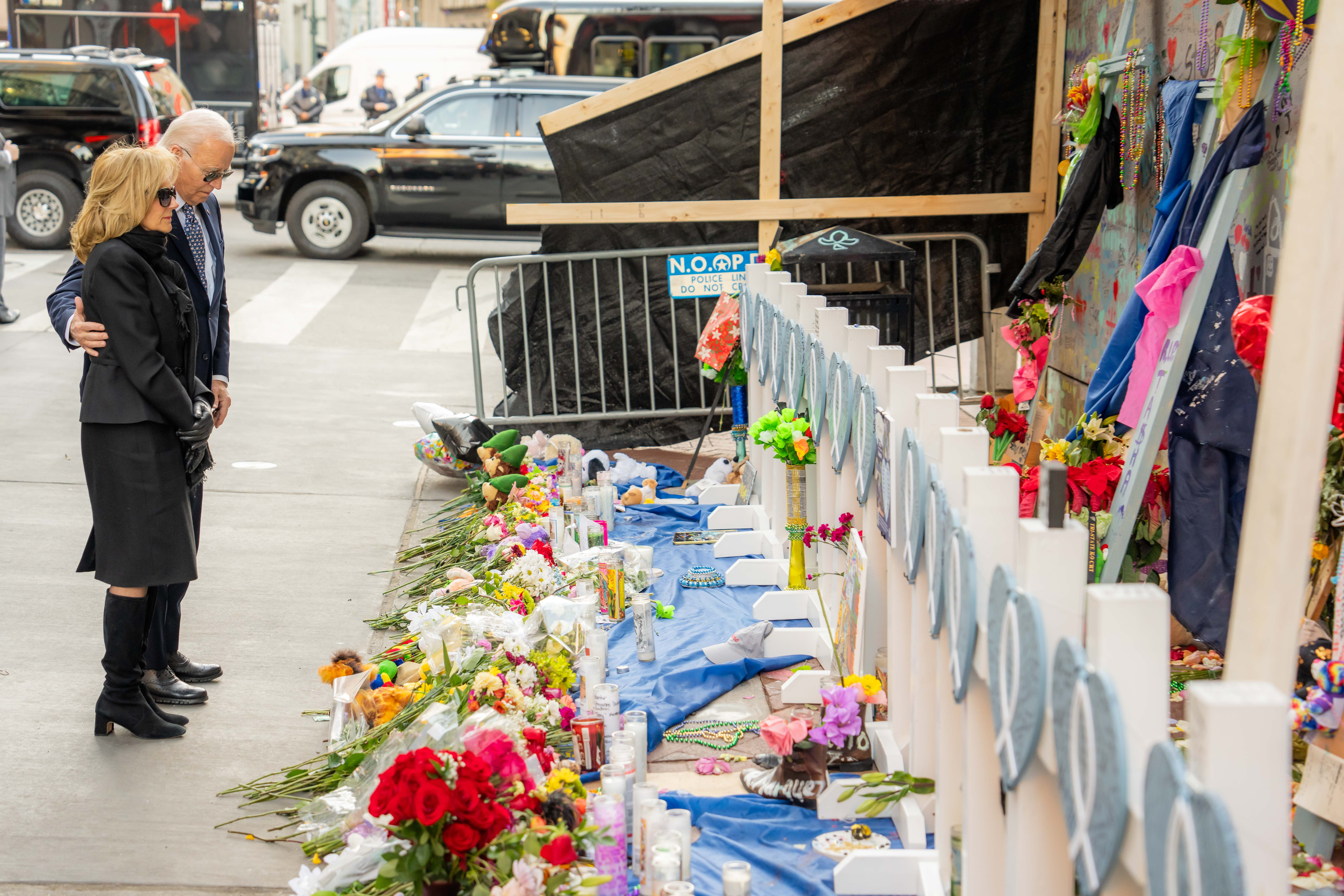
Then-President Biden and then-first lady Jill Biden pay their respects at a memorial to the victims on Bourbon Street, January 6, 2025

Then-U.S. President Joe Biden contacted Mayor LaToya Cantrell to offer support and released a statement saying that his "heart goes out to the victims and their families who were simply trying to celebrate the holiday". Speaker of the House of Representatives Mike Johnson, its majority leader Steve Scalise, and then-president-elect Donald Trump also condemned the attack.

Troy Carter, who represents almost all of New Orleans in the U.S. House, said the attack was an "unspeakable act of violence" and commended the New Orleans Police Department for their work. Bill Cassidy, Louisiana's senior U.S. senator, called the attack "so tragic" and offered thanks to responding officers. Louisiana governor Jeff Landry expressed condolences to the victims of the attack and urged people to avoid the area. John Kennedy, Louisiana's junior U.S. senator, described the attacks as "objective evil".

Just hours after the incident, Landry posted a photo of himself smiling and giving a thumbs-up with his wife and others outside a steakhouse in the city. He captioned the photo: "Ate dinner tonight in New Orleans. Proud to be a part of this incredibly resilient city. See everyone at the game tomorrow!" Social media users criticized Landry's response. In response to the criticism, Landry replied: "It's important to understand that we have many visitors in the city of New Orleans right now. Safety is our top priority, and we want our guests and the world to know that Louisiana does not cower to radical Islamic terrorists. Our restaurants and all that New Orleans has to offer remain open for business!"

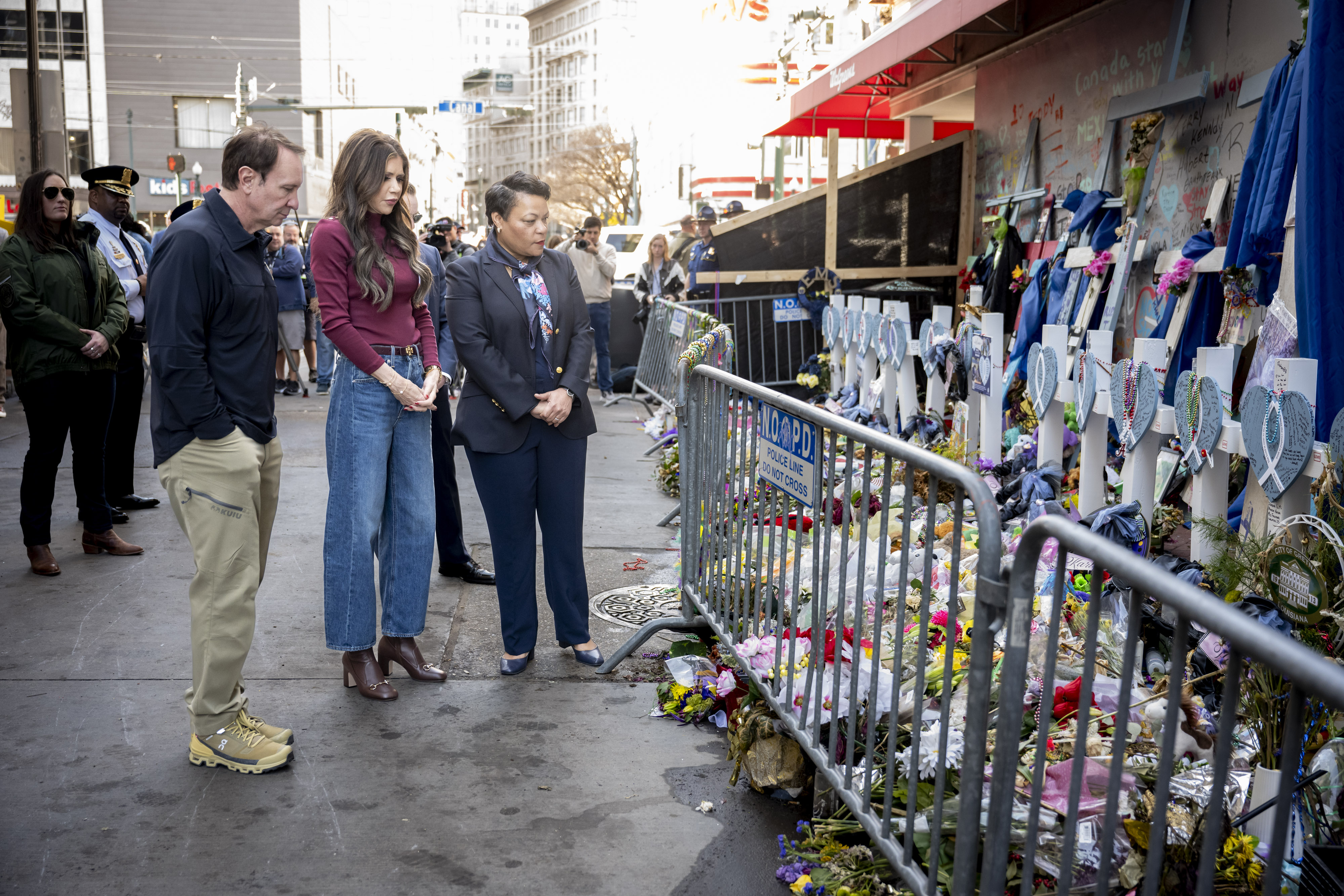
Louisiana Governor Jeff Landry, Homeland Security Secretary Kristi Noem, and New Orleans Mayor LaToya Cantrell at the Bourbon Street memorial, February 3, 2025

Jeff Hundley, the director of the committee that organizes the Sugar Bowl, said the committee was devastated by the terror attack. The University of Georgia Athletic Association said they were "deeply saddened by the senseless violence that occurred in New Orleans", and University of Notre Dame president Robert A. Dowd said that "[our] prayers are with the family members and loved ones of all those impacted by the terrible attack in New Orleans early this morning". UGA President Jere Morehead confirmed that one UGA student was injured in the attacks, and said he was deeply saddened and expressed gratitude for the first responders. The New Orleans Saints and New Orleans Pelicans released a joint statement paying tribute to the victims and the city's resilience. The Pelicans held a moment of silence before their game on the same day against the Miami Heat. During the Sugar Bowl, a moment of silence was held before kickoff, followed by the crowd chanting "U-S-A!" after the national anthem.

In Pasadena, California, a moment of silence for the victims was held during the Rose Parade. A year earlier, a rented Archer barrier had prevented a woman from driving her car into the 2024 Rose Parade.

Superintendent Kirkpatrick expressly refused to cast blame when asked by a journalist whether she was upset that she had not known in advance about the city's Archer barriers. On January 3, 2025, Lieutenant Governor Billy Nungesser criticized the city government in a statement for "a complete failure of responsibility to keep the city safe, from the top down, by not having those barriers in place or even having knowledge of them". Local workers in the French Quarter interviewed by NBC News were appalled by the city's failure to deploy Archer barriers to block sidewalks before the attack. They also challenged the wisdom of the city's decision to replace the permanent bollards during the winter, the busiest season for the French Quarter.

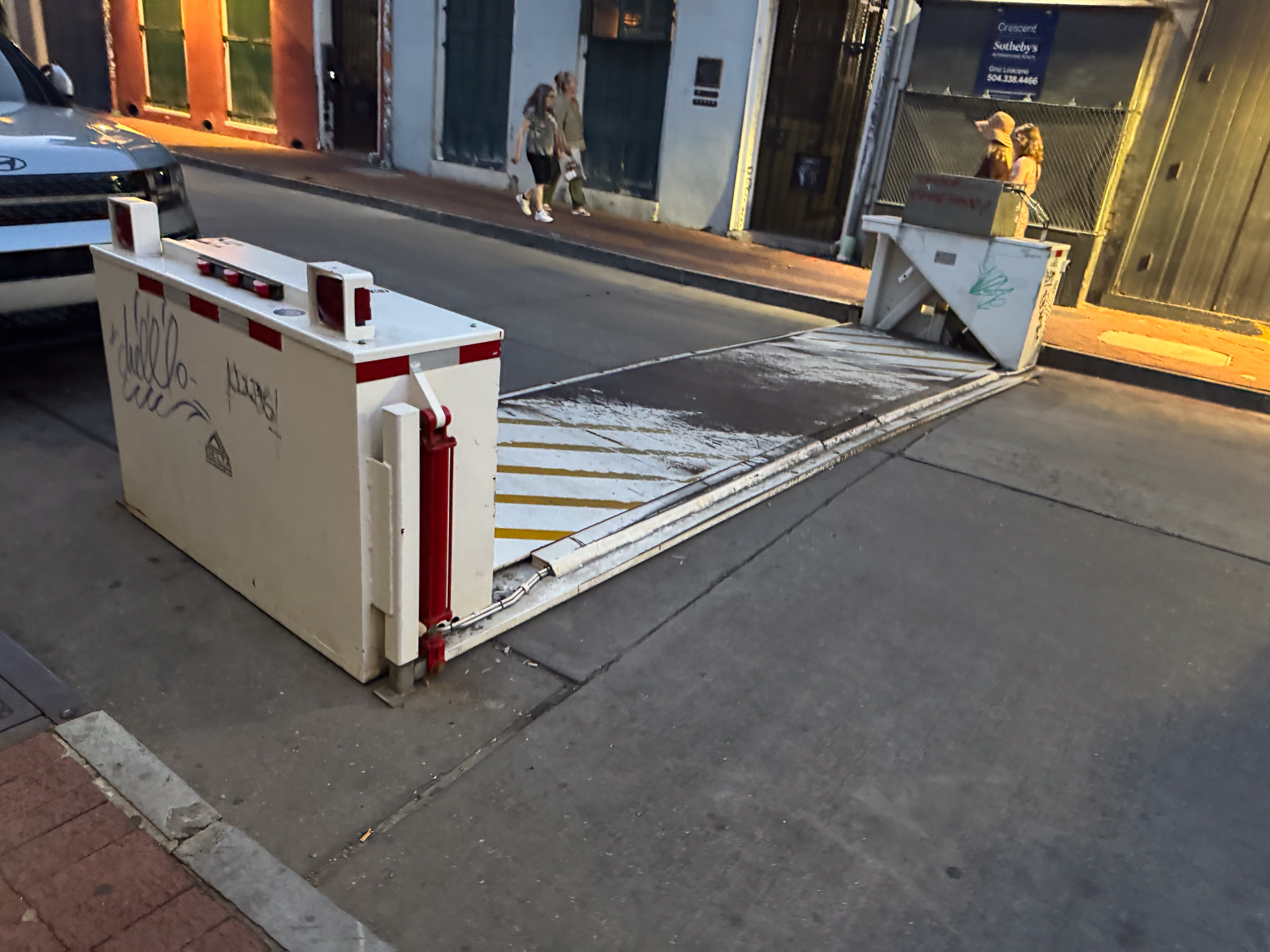
Ramp barrier on Bourbon Street, May 2025

Within a few days, unknown persons had scrawled handwritten messages on the Archer barriers, such as "USE ME" and "DO NOT HIDE ME". In the meantime, Peter Whitford, the chief executive officer of Meridian Rapid Defense Group, traveled to New Orleans to assist the city with properly deploying Archer barriers. He told The Guardian: "We're here to help New Orleans get to the standard that it needs to get to".

The National Football League expressed confidence that spectators and participants alike would have a safe and enjoyable experience at the Super Bowl. The NFL and Saints also provided a $1 million donation to help the families of the victims as well as a league-wide moment of silence for all week 18 games.

The truck's owner said that the FBI had instructed him not to publicly talk about the matter. His wife said she and her husband were devastated and offered condolences.

The husband of Jabbar's ex-wife said Jabbar's daughters were distraught. Jabbar's brother told reporters that when he was questioned by the FBI, "They want to know why he did this. I could not give them an answer. That's not the brother I know." Of the videos recorded by his brother, he said, "It's just hard to believe – it's insane. It's unlike him." He sat down with Beaumont's KBMT-TV for an extensive interview, saying that "he lost his brother" adding that "he caused so much damage and destruction to other people."

The Islamic Society of Greater Houston expressed its condolences to the victims of the attack, saying it was "horrified by the senseless crime targeting civilians" and that "ISGH has a longstanding absolute zero-tolerance policy against extremism and suspicious activities."

A small private funeral for Jabbar was held on February 2, 2025, in Houston.

=== International ===
Many nations condemned the attack and expressed condolences to the victims, including the governments of France, the United Kingdom, Germany, Norway, Ukraine, Georgia, Turkey, Israel, Algeria, the United Arab Emirates, Saudi Arabia, Kuwait, Jordan, Uruguay, and China.

Pope Francis said he was deeply saddened to learn of the loss of life and injuries in the attack and offered prayers to the victims.

King Charles III, William, Prince of Wales, and Catherine, Princess of Wales, expressed shock and sadness at the deaths of the 14 victims, especially the death of British citizen Edward Pettifer, who was killed in the attack. Pettifer was the stepson of Tiggy Legge-Bourke, who had been the nanny to princes William and Harry in the 1990s.

On January 9, the Islamic State, in the 477th issue of its weekly newsletter Al-Naba, praised the attack and Jabbar, calling on other supporters to follow in his footsteps.

== See also ==
- Islamic extremism in the United States
- List of Islamist terrorist attacks
- List of mass shootings in the United States in 2025
- List of terrorist incidents in 2025
- List of terrorist incidents linked to the Islamic State
- List of vehicle-ramming attacks
- Terrorism in the United States
- Domestic terrorism in the United States
