= Floyd Mitchell =

American police officer (born 1967 or 1968)

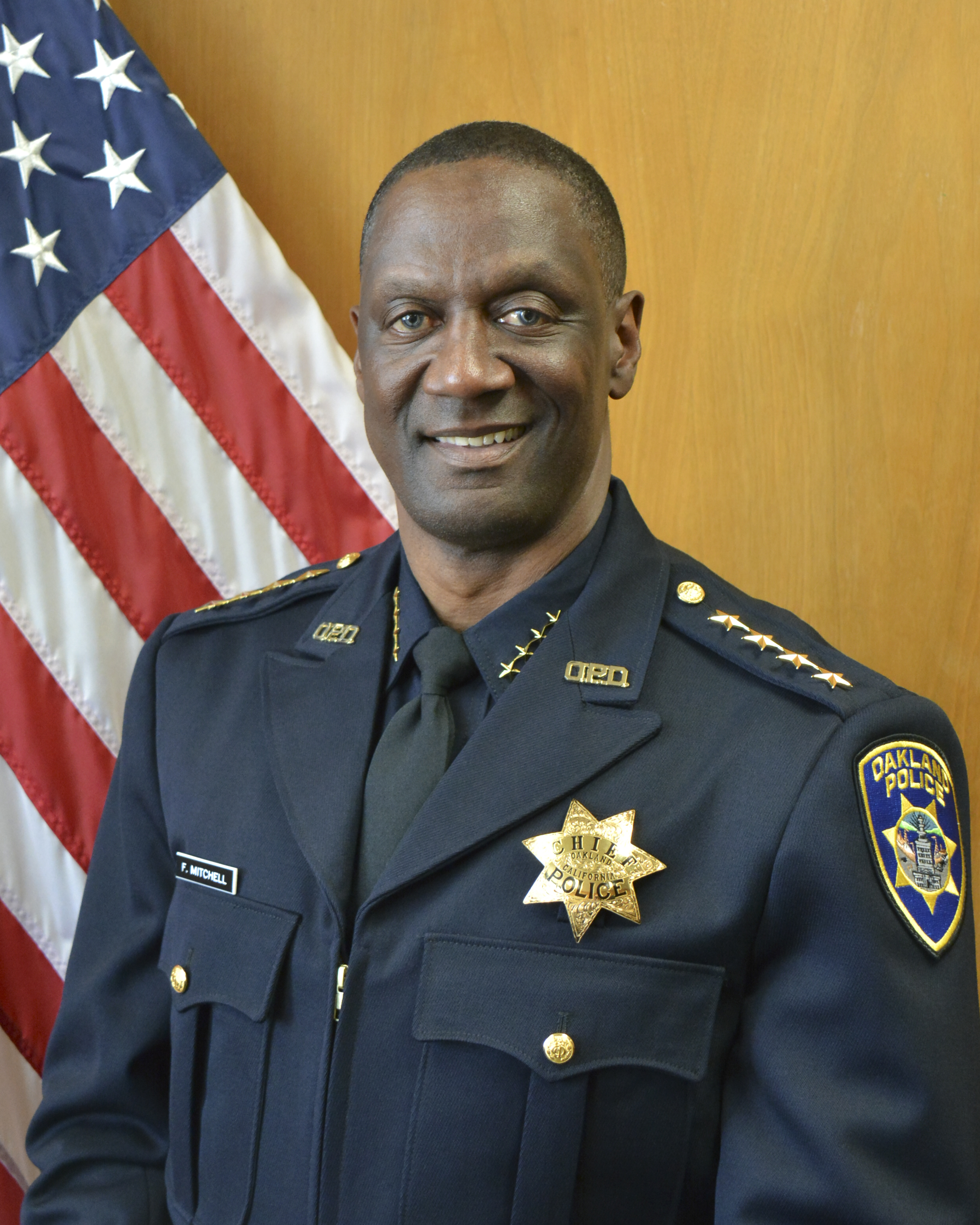
- Official portrait, 2024

Chief of the Oakland Police Department
- In office May 11, 2024 – December 5, 2025
- Preceded by: Darren Allison (acting)

Chief of the Lubbock Police Department
- In office November 2019 – December 5, 2025

Personal details
- Born: 1967 or 1968 (age 58–59) Kansas City, Missouri, U.S.

Military service
- Allegiance: United States
- Branch/service: United States Air Force
- Police career
- Department: Kansas City Police Department; Temple Police Department; Lubbock Police Department; Oakland Police Department

Floyd Mitchell (born 1967 or 1968) is an American police officer who has served as chief of the Oakland Police Department from 2024 to 2025. He previously served as chief of the Lubbock Police Department from 2019 to 2023, as well as chief of the Temple, Texas, police department.

== Early life ==
Mitchell was born 1967 or 1968 in Kansas City, Missouri, to a blue-collar family.

== Career ==
A United States Air Force veteran, Mitchell began his police career with the Kansas City Police Department, serving 25 years with the department, before leaving the department, being appointed as the chief of the Temple, Texas, police department, a position he held for four years. He was then appointed as chief of the Lubbock Police Department in November 2019, the first African-American chief of that department. He resigned as chief on September 22, 2023, having served four years with the department. While chief of the respective departments, crime rates and police response times were reported to have reduced in both, however, in Lubbock, issues arose over the city's 911 system, where the number of "abandoned" calls, calls which were ended before being answered, doubled. He later admitted that he had been too focused on the dispatch time of answered calls and that he had learned from his previous mistakes.

On March 22, 2024, over a year after the firing of previous chief LeRonne Armstrong and a sharp increase in crime in 2023, Mayor of Oakland Sheng Thao announced the appointment of Mitchell, who she described as "a strong leader and a smart crimefighter who delivers results," as chief of the Oakland Police Department to replace acting chief Darren Allison. As chief, Mitchell announced his intent to go on a "listening tour", where he spoke with officers, officials, and community members. He also said one of his goals was to remove the department from a two-decade-long federal oversight following a police brutality incident by instituting reforms. He officially entered office on May 11, with his first day as chief on May 13.

On October 8, 2025, Floyd Mitchell announced his resignation, effective December 5, 2025. He served less than two years as Oakland Police Chief.

On April 16, 2026, Mitchell was sworn in as the Chief of the Fremont Police Department.
