= 2022 Oakland school shooting =

Mass shooting in California, U.S.

- Location: 37°45′57″N 122°09′13″W; King Estates School Complex, 8251 Fontaine Street; Oakland, California, U.S.
- Date: September 28, 2022; 4 years ago c. 12:40 p.m.
- Attack type: School shooting, alleged gang violence, mass shooting
- Weapon: Handguns
- Deaths: 1 (died from injuries on November 17, 2022)
- Injuries: 5

On September 28, 2022, one person was ultimately killed and five people were injured in a mass shooting at King Estates School Complex, an area where three different high schools share a complex campus in Oakland, California. The shooting happened during school hours at 12:45 p.m., when two gunmen, believed by Oakland authorities to not attend the school, entered the campus of Rudsdale High School and opened thirty rounds on people present on campus. While it is reported that the shooting had gang or group overtones, the victims hit were all allegedly innocent bystanders. No suspects have yet been arrested or identified. There is surveillance footage showing two suspected gunmen on campus, and a third person of interest involved.

The sole fatality, a carpenter who worked on the campus, died from his injuries in a hospital on November 17, 2022.

There have been no suspects arrested, or any persons of interest identified, as of 2026.

== Background ==
The East Oakland complex comprises Rudsdale Continuation School, Newcomer high schools, BayTech Charter School, and the headquarters of Sojourner Truth Independent Study. Rudsdale High serves recent immigrants ages 16–21 who have fled violence and instability in their home countries, according to the school's website and CNN.

The campus had a recent issue with violence in August where a student was wounded from being stabbed, and a gun was recovered that same month on campus. A parent advisor at BayTech said the charter school was so concerned about the Oakland Unified School District’s lack of action that it hired its own security guard. An independent security company confirmed that guard was among the six people shot on Wednesday.

Oakland is a city that struggles with violent crime and had a high number of murders in the past several years, surpassing 100 (equivalent to at least 25 per 100,000 residents) and was the site of another alleged gang-related assault on a school the previous month, where three people were injured from bullets fired at Oakland Technical High School.

== Shooting ==
Two shooters were believed by Oakland Police to have entered the school campus and opened fire on campus who were walking around or hanging out and talking to coworkers/students. Thirty shots were fired in total. Officials responded to a 12:45 p.m. report of a shooting, and initially said they are looking for one shooter, but eventually said that more people may have been involved. A getaway driver may have been involved.

A parent told KTVU that she witnessed five potential shooters, and another parent said that he was speaking to his 13-year-old daughter on FaceTime when he heard gunshots in the background; she was hiding under a desk when she called her dad. The school was placed on lockdown; law enforcement officers drew guns while walking through hallways and other areas of school property. The campus was deemed to be cleared of danger shortly after 3 p.m., according to Oakland Mayor Libby Schaaf. Some students were recorded hiding under their desks as lockdown was in place.

Authorities said all students at the affected campuses were reunited with their parents or guardians, who were directed to a reunification center at a church on Mountain Boulevard and Fontaine Street to pick up their children.

== Victims ==
One adult was killed and five other adults were injured in the shooting, with two students, a counselor, a security officer and two other campus employees among the victims. One student, who was also a carpenter working on campus, was shot four times. Another victim, a carpenter working on campus, was grazed with a bullet, but was not severely wounded. However, another carpenter was mortally wounded after having been shot four times. He died of his injuries in the hospital on November 17, 2022.

Three of the wounded were taken to Highland Hospital in Oakland, while the other three were taken to Eden Medical Center in Castro Valley. Three people remained hospitalized as of Friday, September 30, two of them with life-threatening injuries, while one person had been released by Wednesday and two others were released by Friday. During a press conference, Oakland Police Chief LeRonne Armstrong said all of the six people that were shot were not the intended targets but innocent bystanders going to school or working.

== Investigation ==
Authorities announced that they believed that two shooters were responsible for the shooting with a potential additional accomplice, and the shooting is likely gang related. The shooters are believed to have been attempting to target a specific individual, and have recovered video footage and other evidence which shows how the shooters breached the gates of the Rudsdale High School portion of the campus.

== Responses ==
Parents at Bay Tech and staff have been in meetings since Thursday. Many OUSD teachers are threatening to not come back to the school because of the security challenges on the campus. They are also calling for the superintendent of the school district to step down. NBC Bay Area contacted the school district to ask about the parents' accusations and if it made any changes after the earlier incidents. The district previously said it is reviewing its security protocol but declined to comment further.

Governor Gavin Newsom released a statement following the attack: "The governor's office posted a statement on its Twitter page, calling the shooting a "a horrifying act of violence that has grown too familiar. Yet again, our kids were in the crossfire." The office added the gun violence has "taken too much from our communities" and it cannot continue." Oakland mayor Libby Schaaf called for the population to demand for change from those who have the most power to change and that as a whole everyone has to do better.

== See also ==
- Crime in Oakland, California
- List of school shootings in the United States by death toll
- 2022 East High School shooting
- 2022 Central Visual and Performing Arts High School shooting
- 2022 Oakland party shooting, a shooting that took place three days later
