= Sean Whent =

American police chief

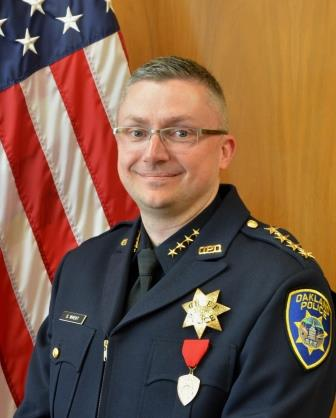
- Police portrait of Whent

Chief of the Oakland Police Department
- In office 2013–2016
- Preceded by: Anthony Toribio (Interim)
- Succeeded by: Benson H. Fairow (Interim)

Sean Whent was the Chief of the Oakland Police Department. Whent was appointed Interim Chief by Mayor Jean Quan in May 2013, replacing Anthony Toribio, who served for only two days following Howard Jordan's resignation. Whent was permanent (non-interim) police chief from May 2014 to June 2016.

Whent spent two decades on the force, joining in 1996. Oakland PD monitor Robert Warshaw forced Whent to resign due to the role of Whent (and his wife) in the coverup of a sexual-misconduct scandal involving Oakland police officers (as well as personnel from multiple other agencies) engaging in sex acts with a minor.

In September, 2016 Whent was a candidate for chief of police of Salinas, California. In February 2018, Whent started as an instructor with the FBI-Law Enforcement Executive Development Association.

Police appointments
Preceded by Anthony Toribio (Interim)	Chief of the Oakland Police Department; 2013–2016	Succeeded by Benson H. Fairow
