= Chief of the Oakland Police Department =

Oakland Chief of Police
- Incumbent; James Beere since November 14, 2025
- Style: The Honorable
- Formation: 1853; 173 years ago
- Website: Official website

The Chief of the Oakland Police Department is an office held by the executive head and highest-ranking officer of the Oakland Police Department. The chief was first established in 1853. The chief manages and oversees the planning, development and implementation of all law enforcement and crime prevention programs for the city. They provide leadership, vision and direction to the department and its command staff and promotes collaboration, communication and coordination with other city agencies and community organizations.

Sean Whent became police chief in May 2014. He became interim chief in May 2013, replacing interim chief Anthony Toribio, who served for only two days after chief Howard Jordan left for uncited medical reasons. Howard was preceded by Anthony Batts.

Whent spent two decades on the force, joining in 1996. Oakland PD monitor Robert Warshaw forced Whent to resign due to the role of Whent (and his wife) in the coverup of a sexual-misconduct scandal involving Oakland police officers (as well as personnel from multiple other agencies) and a child sex trafficking victim.

Mayor Libby Schaaf appointed City Administrator Sabrina Landreth as head of the department on June 17, 2016, putting it under civilian control, after 3 police chiefs resigned within 9 days. The department had been under multiple investigations at the time of the appointment. On January 4, 2017, Schaaf appointed Anne Kirkpatrick to serve as the next police chief. Kirkpatrick officially assumed office after being sworn in on February 27. On February 15, 2023, Oakland Mayor Sheng Thao announced plans to fire the city's current police chief LeRonne Armstrong.

On March 27, 2024, Oakland Mayor Sheng Thao introduced Floyd Mitchell as the city's newest chief of police, more than a year after the firing of former Chief LeRonne Armstrong. He took office on May 13, 2024. In October 2025, Mitchell announced he was resigning.

On November 14, 2025, Oakland Mayor Barbara Lee appointed James Beere as Chief of Police.

== List of Oakland police chiefs ==
* Acting/interim chief

Image	Name	Tenure start	Tenure end	Notes	Refs.
—N/a	Joseph Samuels	1993	1999		
—N/a	Richard Word	1999	2004		
—N/a	Wayne Tucker	2004	2009		
	Anthony Batts	October 19, 2009	October 13, 2011		
	Howard Jordan	October 13, 2011	May 8, 2013		
—N/a	Anthony Toribio*	May 8, 2013	May 10, 2013		
	Sean Whent	May 10, 2013	June 10, 2016	Acting until May 2014. Forced to resign; see Oakland Police Department § Resignation of three chiefs and civilian control (2016)	
—N/a	Ben Fairow*	June 10, 2016	June 15, 2016	See Oakland Police Department § Resignation of three chiefs and civilian control (2016)	
—N/a	Paul Figueroa*	June 15, 2016	June 18, 2016	See Oakland Police Department § Resignation of three chiefs and civilian control (2016)	
—N/a	Sabrina Landreth	June 18, 2016	January 4, 2017	See Oakland Police Department § Resignation of three chiefs and civilian control (2016)	
	Anne Kirkpatrick	January 4, 2017	February 20, 2020	Fired; see Oakland Police Department § Firing of Anne Kirkpatrick (2020)	
	Darren Allison*	February 20, 2020	April 6, 2020		
	Susan Manheimer*	April 6, 2020	February 7, 2021		
	LeRonne Armstrong	February 7, 2021	February 15, 2023	Fired	
	Darren Allison*	February 15, 2023	May 11, 2024		
	Floyd Mitchell	May 11, 2024	December 5, 2025	Resigned	
	James Beere	July 9, 2026			
