= Howard Jordan (police officer) =

American police officer

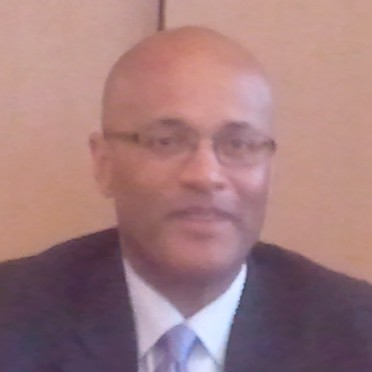

Chief of the Oakland Police Department
- In office October 13, 2011 – May 8, 2013
- Preceded by: Anthony Batts
- Succeeded by: Anthony Toribio (Interim)

Personal details
- Occupation: Police Chief, Retired

Howard Jordan is the former Chief of the Oakland Police Department. Jordan was appointed Interim Chief by Mayor Jean Quan in October 2011 after the resignation of Chief Anthony Batts. The appointment was made permanent the following February. Prior to his appointment as Chief, Jordan had accrued over twenty years experience as a member of the Oakland Police Department.

Jordan had previously served as Interim Chief in 2009 following the resignation of Wayne Tucker.

Jordan announced his retirement for medical reasons on May 8, 2013. Assistant Chief Anthony Toribio became the department's interim chief in accordance with department policy, replaced by Sean Whent only two days later.

Police appointments
Preceded by Anthony Batts	Chief of the Oakland Police Department; 2011–2013	Succeeded by Anthony Toribio (Interim)
