= Mervin Ray Hughes =

American serial killer on death row

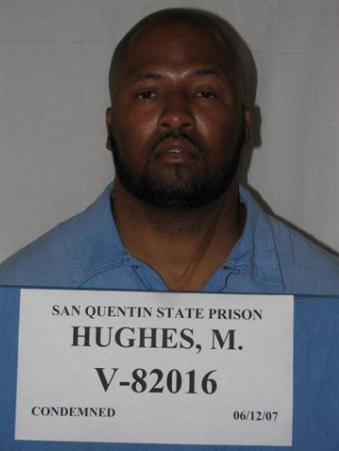
- Born: January 27, 1969 (age 57); California, U.S.
- Other name: "The Serial Shooter"
- Convictions: First degree murder with special circumstances (2 counts); Involuntary manslaughter Attempted murder (2 counts); Assault with a deadly weapon (7 counts) (Note: plus 8 other counts)
- Penalty: Death

Details
- Victims: 3–4+
- Span of crimes: 1986–1999
- Country: United States
- State: California
- Date apprehended: January 30, 1999
- Imprisoned at: San Quentin State Prison

Mervin Ray Hughes (born January 27, 1969), known as The Serial Shooter, is an American serial killer who committed a series of drive-by shootings in Oakland, California, in January 1999, killing two people and injuring several others. He had previously been convicted of manslaughter in a 1986 shooting death and was suspected of killing a man in another city in 1992. Hughes was found guilty of his known crimes and was sentenced to death in 2005.

== Murders ==
On September 16, 1986, Hughes, then 17, shot 38-year-old Jesse Clarence Dunlap in Oakland during a drug-related dispute. Dunlap was rushed to Highland Hospital where he died from his injuries. Hughes was quickly arrested and convicted of involuntary manslaughter, receiving a sentence of eight years in prison. He was released sometime before 1992 but was later arrested for the murder of a man in another city, but that case was later dropped after alleged witnesses refused to testify.

=== Oakland shooting spree ===
Between January 15 and January 29, 1999, Hughes went on a shooting spree within four neighborhoods in East Oakland. During this time, Hughes shot eleven victims, killing two. His modus operandi was to drive around the Oakland area in his car and commit drive-by shootings. On the first attack, Hughes shot a man on the 2200 block on 62nd Avenue, with the man ultimately surviving. The next day, Hughes scouted out the 2500 block on Seminary Avenue, where he shot and killed 20-year-old Terry Love. After a seven-day hiatus, Hughes scouted out an area on the 5000 block of Bancroft Avenue, where he shot a man who survived.

By the third shooting, area police became weary and suspected a single killer was responsible. That suspicion was confirmed when, on January 27, Hughes returned to Bancroft Avenue where he shot at three men, one of whom was 33-year-old Robert M. Fisher, who was killed. The other two survived. A day later, Hughes returned to the site of his first attack, the 2200 block on 62nd Avenue, where he shot another man, who survived. Hours later, Hughes struck the 1700 block of 48th Avenue, when he shot three men, all of whom were wounded but survived.

Hughes committed his last attacks within hours of one another on January 29, the first of which he committed on the 1700 block of 57th Avenue, where he shot a man and a woman who both survived. Hours later he struck for the final time, shooting a man on the 3000 block on 62nd Avenue. He survived. One of three cars Hughes drove around while committing the shootings was spotted, and the registration was written down. It was traced back to Hughes, who was arrested on January 30. Police confiscated his 9mm semi-automatic and his two other vehicles. Hughes' surviving victims were identified as Anthony Alexander, Ernest Badger, Donal Griffin, Shirley Jackson, Christopher Jones, Lavern Smith and John Witt.

== Trial and imprisonment ==
On February 2, 1999, Hughes was arraigned and charged with two counts of murder, two counts of attempted murder, seven counts of assault with a deadly weapon, three counts of discharging a firearm negligently, and one count of possession of a firearm while on parole. During his arraignment, Hughes' mother, Pauline, fainted in the courtroom, causing Judge Horace Wheatley to stop the arraignment. The woman was rushed to the hospital, where she was treated. Officials declined to say how she fainted. Hughes pleaded not guilty to all charges, which, if he were to be convicted, meant he could face a death sentence.

In 2004, Hughes was found guilty in both murder cases and 17 other felony counts, but the jury deadlocked 10–2 in its decision to sentence Hughes to death. His conviction's stood, and a new jury was brought in the following year. On March 9, 2005, after six hours of deliberating, the jury decided to sentence Hughes to death. During his sentencing, Superior Court Judge Joseph Hurley called Hughes, "the worst of the worst". Hughes was also given an additional 300-year sentence for him to serve if his death sentence was to be dismissed by an appellate court. Hughes is awaiting execution at San Quentin State Prison. No execution date has been set.

== See also ==
- List of death row inmates in the United States
- List of serial killers in the United States
