= Anne Kirkpatrick (police officer) =

American law enforcement officer (born 1959)

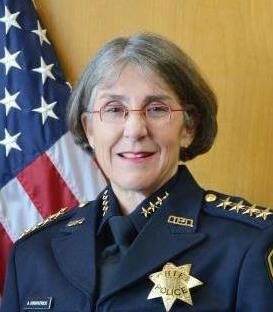

Superintendent of the New Orleans Police Department
- Incumbent
- Assumed office November 1, 2023
- Preceded by: Shaun D. Ferguson

Personal details
- Born: 1959 (age 66–67)
- Education: King College; Memphis State University; Seattle University School of Law

Anne Kirkpatrick (born 1959) is an American law enforcement officer and the current superintendent of the New Orleans Police Department. Prior to New Orleans, she was the former chief of the Spokane Police Department and the first woman to head the Oakland Police Department.

== Early life and education ==
Kirkpatrick is from Memphis, Tennessee, where she graduated in 1977 from Hutchison School, a private, independent college preparatory day school for girls located in Memphis. She earned a Bachelor of Arts degree in Business Administration from King College in 1982, and a Master of Science degree in Counseling from the Memphis State University in 1984. She earned a Juris Doctor at Seattle University School of Law in 1989.

== Career ==
Kirkpatrick began her career in law enforcement with the Memphis Police Department, and in Washington State was a police officer in Redmond and then a college instructor in criminal justice. She later served as Chief of Police for five years each in Ellensburg, Federal Way, and finally Spokane, from which position she retired in 2012 to become a leadership instructor for the FBI. She was also Chief Deputy of the King County Sheriff's Office for two years. In 2016 she was one of three finalists to become Superintendent of the Chicago Police Department; Mayor Rahm Emanuel subsequently appointed her Chief of the department's Bureau of Professional Standards.

=== Oakland, California, Chief of Police ===
On January 4, 2017, after six months in Chicago, Kirkpatrick was appointed by Mayor Libby Schaaf of Oakland, California, as the city's first female Chief of Police. She was sworn in on February 27, 2017.

On November 6, 2017, the chair of Oakland's privacy advisory commission, Brian Hofer, and seven others filed a complaint with Oakland's Citizens Police Review Board claiming that Kirkpatrick had made false statements about an August raid in West Oakland.

On February 20, 2020, the Oakland Police Commission voted unanimously to fire Kirkpatrick with Schaaf joining in the decision as required by the law for a police chief to be fired without cause, saying that the commission's trust in Kirkpatrick was "irrevocably broken". Kirkpatrick subsequently filed a federal lawsuit accusing the city of firing her as retaliation for reports she had made against the behavior of commissioners. In May 2022, the jury ruled partially in Kirkpatrick's favor, awarding her one year's pay, $337,000. One juror said there was "evidence that retaliation played some role in her discharge". In July 2022, the City of Oakland agreed to pay her that amount plus her legal costs, a total of $1.5 million.

=== Superintendent, New Orleans Police ===
Kirkpatrick was appointed interim superintendent of the New Orleans Police Department by Mayor LaToya Cantrell in September 2023, and after confirmation by the city council was sworn in as superintendent on November 1, 2023, the city's first permanent female superintendent.

In August 2024, she struck two pedestrians with her car while on duty.

Police appointments
Preceded by Sabrina Landreth (City Administrator)	Chief of the Oakland Police Department; 2017–2020	Succeeded by Darren Allison (interim)
