= 2009 shootings of Oakland police officers =

Mass shooting in California, U.S.

2009 shooting of Oakland Police Officers
- Aerial view of the initial traffic stop at 74th Avenue and MacArthur.
- Location: Oakland, California, U.S.
- Date: March 21, 2009; 1:08 – 3:20 p.m. (PDT)
- Target: Police officers of the Oakland Police Department
- Attack type: Mass shooting, Shootout, Ambush, Resisting arrest, Mass Murder
- Weapons: 9mm semi-automatic pistol; 7.62×39mm SKS semi-automatic rifle
- Deaths: 5 (including the perpetrator)
- Injuries: 1
- Perpetrator: Lovelle Shawn Mixon

Four police officers in Oakland, California, were fatally shot on March 21, 2009, by Lovelle Mixon, a convicted felon wanted on a no-bail warrant for a parole violation. Mixon shot and killed two police officers of the Oakland Police Department during a routine traffic stop. After escaping on foot to the nearby apartment of his sister, Mixon shot and killed two police SWAT team officers attempting to apprehend him. Mixon was killed as other officers on the team returned fire.

March 21, 2009 was the deadliest attack on law enforcement since 9/11. It was the deadliest attack on California police officers since the Newhall massacre in 1970, when four California Highway Patrol officers were shot and killed by two men in Santa Clarita. The killing of four police officers in Lakewood, Washington, in November 2009 equaled it; and both were surpassed by a mass shooting in Dallas, Texas, in July 2016 that killed five police officers.

== Events ==
=== Traffic stop on MacArthur Boulevard ===
On March 21, 2009, at 1:08pm. PDT, Mixon was pulled over in a routine traffic stop, while driving a 1995 Buick sedan; two motorcycle officers, Officer John Hege and Sergeant Mark Dunakin, stopped him for a traffic violation on 74th Avenue and MacArthur Boulevard in East Oakland, one block from Eastmont Town Center and an Oakland Police Department (OPD) substation. After reviewing Mixon's driver's license, Sergeant Dunakin became suspicious that it was fake and signaled to his partner, Officer Hege, to arrest Mixon. Mixon leaned out of the vehicle's side window, and opened fire with a semi-automatic pistol without warning, shooting both officers twice. After the officers collapsed, he got out of the car, approached them, and fired execution-style directly into their backs. He briefly stood over the bodies before fleeing on foot. Witnesses reported Mixon as having fired six shots. Neither officer returned fire. Witnesses said Mixon fled westward into the surrounding neighborhood on 74th Avenue southbound.

By the time ambulances arrived, Sergeant Dunakin had died, and Officer Hege was found to be mortally wounded, having been shot behind the left ear.

Mixon's family members were aware of his criminal activity. He was a convicted felon wanted on a no-bail warrant for a parole violation. According to a cousin, Mixon had recently purchased the handgun (illegal for a felon on parole), as well as the Buick he had been driving when stopped. Mixon was talking with his uncle on a cell phone when stopped and said he would call back. "But he was probably thinking about that piece he had in the car", said his cousin Curtis Mixon, 38, "and he wasn't about to go back to jail."

=== Manhunt for the shooter ===
An intense manhunt for Mixon was conducted, with participation by some 200 officers from the OPD, the Alameda County Sheriff's Office, the BART Police Department, the California Highway Patrol, and several agencies from various cities. He was described to police as a black male wearing all-black clothing and wire-rimmed sunglasses. Nearby streets were cordoned off, and an entire area of East Oakland was closed to traffic. However, due to the absence of senior Oakland police officers, positions in the new command post were self-assigned by the on-scene commanders, who were overwhelmed by the citywide response. It took 90 minutes for senior officers to arrive at the scene and take control of the manhunt. Eventually, after a search on the Buick was conducted, Mixon was formally identified as the suspect in the MacArthur Boulevard shooting.

As police descended on the neighborhood, a local woman walked up to MacArthur Boulevard to see what the commotion was about. She noticed the burgundy Buick, and recalled seeing Mixon in the car during the previous few days. She also knew that Mixon's sister lived in a two-bedroom, ground-level apartment on 74th Avenue, just a block from where the motorcycle officers were shot. Although she knew her life would be in danger if she were labeled a "snitch", the woman decided to give this information to an officer she recognized. The information was then relayed to Lieutenant Christopher Mufarreh, who was investigating Mixon's possible whereabouts independently, by an off-duty police lieutenant. Without consultation or coordination with his superiors, Mufarreh ordered a SWAT team to converge on the scene.

Upon meeting up with the off-duty lieutenant and the woman who reported Mixon's current position, Mufarreh didn't believe the latter's credibility as an eyewitness, as she didn't see Mixon directly enter the apartment, and dismissed her statement. However, at the same time, another eyewitness had come forward with a valid account of seeing Mixon enter the apartment, although Mufarreh was unaware of that, as he had not reported back to the lieutenant who received the statement. Mufarreh ordered a perimeter to be set up around the apartment, while the first members of the SWAT team arrived at the scene.

At 2:38 p.m., Mufarreh decided to have the SWAT team enter and clear the ground floor of the apartment before sending in a tracking dog. However, the full SWAT team had yet to be assembled. Sergeant Daniel Sakai was then reassigned by Mufarreh from his previous position as canine coordinator to the SWAT team.

Unknown to the SWAT team, following the MacArthur Boulevard shooting with the pistol, Mixon had managed to secure an SKS carbine with a fixed bayonet, likely stored in his sister's apartment.

Police eventually concluded that the lives of people in the three-story apartment building might be at risk, so they couldn't afford to barricade the building and wait. They determined that due to the location of Mixon's sister's apartment within the building, there was no way to ensure that other residents could safely be brought through the single front entry door to the street. Mufarreh decided to send in the SWAT officers prematurely, assessing that the threat level was low due to a high unlikelihood that Mixon would actually be present inside the apartment. Tactical commander Captain Rick Orozco approved of Mufarreh's plan.

=== Shootout on 74th Avenue ===
At 3:02 p.m., SWAT team officers raided the apartment, breaking down the door while throwing nonlethal shock (flashbang) grenades.

At the time of the raid, the room was poorly illuminated. Sergeant Pat Gonzales entered the room first, followed by Sergeant Ervin Romans. As Romans entered, he was ambushed by Mixon, who shot him through the wall and door of a bedroom he was hiding in, mortally wounding him. Gonzales was then shot and wounded in the shoulder, although he continued to lead the team inside the bedroom. None of the officers had yet managed to fire their weapons due to the poor lighting of the room. They were momentarily surprised by a young girl who had been wounded in her leg by the flash grenade who screamed loudly and fled from the bathroom.

As Romans was evacuated, one of the other SWAT officers then spotted Mixon beside the bedroom door, equipped with the SKS rifle, and fired at him. Mixon was forced to retreat inside the room and close the door. The team moved towards the bedroom and partially forced the door open. As he managed to get inside, Sakai was shot and mortally wounded by Mixon. Gonzales rushed into the room next and tripped on the floor, falling in front of Mixon. Mixon shot at Gonzales while he was falling and could have struck Gonzales in the head, although the bullet was deflected by Gonzales' tactical helmet, which protected him from injury. Spotting Mixon, Gonzales opened fire and was joined by Alameda County Sheriff's Deputy Derek Pope; Mixon was felled by the barrage of gunfire and died from his wounds at 3:20 p.m.

== Victims ==
During this incident, four policemen were killed in the line of duty, and a fifth officer was also shot but survived.

Killed

- Motorcycle Sergeant Mark Dunakin, age 40, had been with the OPD since 1991. He left behind a widow and three children His wife had served as an Alameda County Sheriff's Deputy, surviving the 1998 shooting that killed Deputy John Monego. She was later killed in a car crash in 2019.
- Motorcycle Officer John Hege, age 41, had been with the OPD since 1999. He was the only officer to survive long enough to donate organs.
- SWAT Sergeant Ervin Romans, age 43, had been with the OPD since 1996. He left behind a widow and four children.
- SWAT Sergeant Daniel Sakai, age 35, had been with the OPD since 2000. He left behind a widow and daughter.

Officers Dunakin, Romans, and Sakai died on the day of the shooting, while Officer Hege died from his injuries three days later.

Injured

- SWAT Sergeant Pat Gonzales was shot through the left shoulder and had a second bullet ricochet off his helmet.

== Perpetrator ==
Lovelle Shawn Mixon (September 11, 1982 – March 21, 2009), a 26-year-old resident of Oakland, was identified as the assailant. He was born in San Francisco. Mixon wielded a 9mm semiautomatic handgun during the MacArthur Boulevard killings, and an SKS rifle during the shootout in the 74th Avenue apartment shootout.

Mixon had an extensive criminal history. Beginning at age 13, he was arrested multiple times for battery, and by age 20 was serving a Corcoran state prison sentence following a felony conviction for assault with a deadly weapon and armed robbery in San Francisco. After he was paroled, Mixon went in and out of prison. When the shootings happened, he was living in East Oakland at his grandmother's house and was wanted on a no-bail arrest warrant for violating his current parole conditions. Had Mixon been arrested for his parole violation, he would have faced at most six months in jail. On March 20, 2009, the day before the shootings, he robbed and raped two women.

Mixon had also been the primary suspect in a previous murder case. However, due to lack of evidence he had been charged only with lesser violations, which included possession of drug paraphernalia, forgery, identity theft, attempted grand theft, and receiving stolen property.

== Aftermath ==
=== Racial tensions ===
Race-related tensions surfaced following the shootings. Since Mixon was black and the slain officers were of White and/or Asian descent, several community leaders voiced concern that the confrontation might lead to increased tensions between Oakland's black community and the OPD. About 20 bystanders had taunted police as they gathered at the scene of the motorcycle police shootings. Citing their cause as resistance to police brutality, Uhuru House activists, who promote a form of Pan-Africanism they refer to as "African internationalism", handed out flyers in the neighborhood where Mixon was shot, inviting people to a rally where they might "uphold the resistance of Brother Lovelle Mixon". The San Francisco Bay View, which identifies itself as a "National Black Newspaper," suggested that the killing of four police officers was a victory for "the people" and referred to Lovelle Mixon's death as a "murder". Approximately 60 people attended the March 25 Uhuru House rally in support of Mixon. The demonstrators marched down MacArthur Boulevard, some carrying signs proclaiming "genocide". On the other hand, Caroline Mixon, a cousin of Lovelle Mixon, paid a public tribute to the Oakland police, thanking them for "serv[ing] and protect[ing] the city of Oakland."

=== Timeline ===
- March 22 – California Gov. Arnold Schwarzenegger ordered flags at the state capitol flown at half-staff in honor of the slain officers.
- March 23 – Officer John Hege's organs were harvested. After Hege was transferred to the hospital, doctors determined that his brain lacked sufficient activity to sustain life. He was the only one of the four fatally shot officers who was a registered organ donor, and he had to be deemed officially brain dead before his organs could legally be harvested. As a result, he was kept on life support awaiting the official declaration of brain death and subsequent organ harvesting. Hege was pronounced officially brain dead on March 22. His organs were harvested on March 23, he was disconnected from life support that evening, and he died afterwards. His organ and tissue donations saved four lives and enhanced 50 others.
- March 24 – A vigil was held by the City of Oakland at the site of the shootings. At least 1,000 people attended, including Mayor Ron Dellums, Police Chief Howard Jordan, and Lieutenant Governor John Garamendi.
- March 24 – Mixon's sister, Enjoli Mixon, in whose apartment the shooting occurred, appeared in a Fremont court after being arrested on a bench warrant stemming from an October, 2008 misdemeanor drug charge.
- March 25 – United States Congressman Jerry McNerney gave a speech on the floor of the House of Representatives honoring the four slain police officers.
- March 25 – A vigil for Mixon, sponsored by the Uhuru Movement, was held along Oakland's MacArthur Boulevard, close to where the shootings occurred. It was attended by Mixon's mother, his wife, some of his family members, and approximately 60 other people.
- March 27 – A public funeral for the four officers was held at Oakland's Oracle Arena. It was attended by at least 21,000 people (see below). Overflow attendance was held at the Oakland Collesium next door.
- March 31 – Approximately 500 people attended the funeral service for Mixon. The service included family members, friends, singers and poets, and it was held at Fuller Funerals on International Boulevard in Oakland. A Nation of Islam minister asked everyone to remember that they were gathered to support Mixon's family, and one family member spoke of how Mixon had strayed from God.
- March 31 – Several hundred people gathered in the early evening at an event organized by Pastors of Oakland, which is composed primarily of black ministers. Caroline Mixon, a cousin of Lovelle Mixon, publicly praised the Oakland Police Department for serving and protecting the people of Oakland. Rev. Doug Stevens exhorted those gathered to live as if they were already in heaven, "without regard to color or class".
- April 10 – The Oakland Athletics paid tribute to the four slain officers at Oakland–Alameda County Coliseum in a special ceremony before its home opener against the Seattle Mariners. A's players donned Oakland Police caps for the ceremony and debuted "OPD" patches on their white home uniforms, which were worn for the remainder of the 2009 season.
- May 4 – A state laboratory associated with the Oakland Police Department reported that Lovelle Mixon's DNA linked him to the rape of a 12-year-old girl on February 5, 2009, and also proved that he robbed and raped two young women on the morning of the shootings. Based on this latest revelation, California State's Attorney General Jerry Brown, former Mayor of Oakland, stated that Mixon had been "a one-man destruction force". Sgt. Dom Arotzarena, president of the Oakland Police Officers Association, lamented that this new information "doesn't bring the guys back ... all it says is, to his supporters, this is who you're supporting. Congratulations for supporting a monster."

=== Police officers' funeral ===
On March 27, 2009, a funeral was held for the slain officers. The entire 800-strong Oakland police force, as well as police departments from around the state and nation, as well as a contingent from Canada, attended the event.

Speakers included Governor Arnold Schwarzenegger, Senators Dianne Feinstein and Barbara Boxer, and Attorney General Jerry Brown. Oakland Mayor Ron Dellums attended; however, he was asked not to speak at the funeral by at least two of the slain officers' families, and he honored this request. Congresswoman Barbara Lee, Lt. Gov. John Garamendi, Mayor Gavin Newsom of San Francisco and Mayor Antonio Villaraigosa of Los Angeles also attended but did not speak. Oakland Police Department Chaplain, Father Jayson Landeza, read a letter of sympathy and support from President and First Lady Barack and Michelle Obama. Relatives, friends, and fellow officers delivered eulogies to the four slain officers, praising their heroism, humanity, and selfless service to the people of Oakland.

A tribute came from Oakland Police Captain Edward Tracey, commander of the SWAT team that cornered Mixon. "These were my men ... [T]hey died doing what they loved: riding on motorcycles, kicking in doors, serving on SWAT", he said.

Referring to press coverage that attempted to link the killing of the officers to the January 1, 2009, slaying of Oscar Grant (by a B.A.R.T. police officer, not an Oakland PD officer), retired Oakland Police Department Lieutenant Lawrence Eade admonished the press: "For those who manipulate the story, may your careers be extremely difficult until you tell the truth... This is not about your ratings, this is about a tragic loss... The citizens are not arming themselves against the police, there is no war between us and you cannot create one!"

== Other tributes ==
- A portion of Interstate 580 (California) is now called the Sgt. Daniel Sakai Memorial Highway.
- President Barack Obama mentioned Sgt. Mark Dunakin in his remarks at the National Peace Officers' Memorial on May 15, 2010.
- On March 21, 2012, the third anniversary of the shootings, the Keller Avenue Bridge on Interstate 580 (California); I-580 was designated as the Sergeant Mark Dunakin, Sergeant Ervin Romans, Sgt. Daniel Sakai and Officer John Hege Memorial Bridge.
- In honor of fallen soldiers and first responders, Crossfit has created what are referred to as "Hero WOD's" (Hero Workout Of The Day). The workout titled "Danny" after Daniel Sakai, is a 20 Minute AMRAP of 30 Box Jumps, 20 Push Press, and 30 Pull-up's (115lb RX)
- Police, community members, family and friends gathered to honor the fallen at St. Benedict's Roman Catholic Church in East Oakland.

== See also ==
- List of law enforcement officers killed in the line of duty in the United States
- List of homicides in California
- Newhall incident
