= Oakland Police Department =

Law enforcement agency serving Oakland, CA

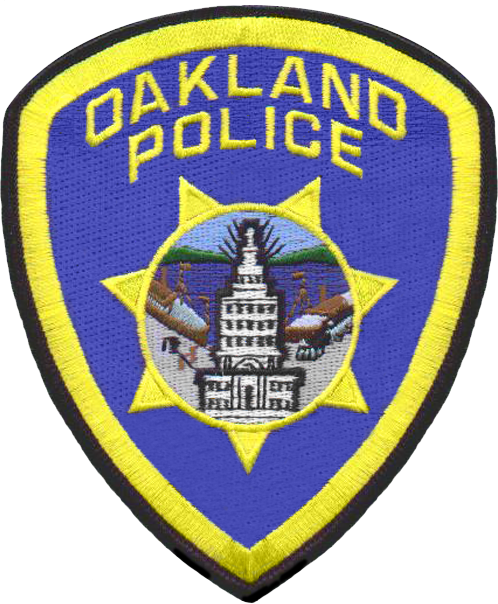
- Patch of Oakland Police Department

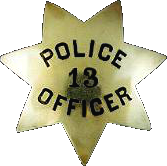
- Badge of Oakland Police Department
- Common name: Oakland P.D.
- Abbreviation: OPD

Agency overview
- Formed: 1853; 173 years ago
- Employees: 1,080 (2021)
- Annual budget: $330 million (2021)

Jurisdictional structure
- Operations jurisdiction: California, U.S.
- Jurisdiction of the OPD
- Population: 429,114 (2018)
- Legal jurisdiction: Oakland, California
- General nature: Local civilian police

Operational structure
- Headquarters: 455 7th St., Oakland, CA
- Police officers: 613
- Technicians and civilian members: 371
- Agency executive: James Beere, Chief Of Police

Website
- www.oaklandca.gov/departments/police

The Oakland Police Department (OPD) is a law enforcement agency responsible for policing the city of Oakland, California, United States. As of May 2021, the department employed 709 sworn officers and 371 civilian employees. The department is divided into 5 geographical divisions policing Oakland's 78 square miles and population of 420,000. The OPD receives 550,000 annual calls for service, and responds to over 250,000 law enforcement incidents.

== History ==
The Oakland Police Department was formed in 1853 by Oakland founder and first mayor Horace W. Carpentier. Oakland had been incorporated as a town by the state legislature in 1852, and with its rapid expansion, Carpentier felt the need to organize a city government with a police force to provide regular law enforcement. Heretofore, vigilante justice had been the norm. On October 15, 1853, the town council appointed John McCann as the first town marshal, assisted by two deputies and operating out of a small waterfront building which also housed the police court and jail. Oakland's growth continued when it became the western terminus of the transcontinental railroad in 1869. It developed into a major port and industrial center, including the manufacture of ships and, later, automobiles. By 1872, the Alameda County Courthouse opened at 4th and Broadway and cases deemed too serious for police court were tried there. By 1874, the department was headquartered in the new city hall located at 14th and Washington. By 1886, the department had installed telephone call boxes for foot patrolmen and purchased horse-drawn wagons for patrol, which, according to the Oakland Review, were the first such conveyances used by police in California. The wagons also doubled as ambulances.

In 1900, the city had a population of 67,690 and a police force of 61 officers, and grew rapidly thereafter. Oakland PD was on the forefront of innovation under the leadership of Chief Adelbert Wilson (1906 to 1912) as it instituted advances in modern telephone communications, criminalistics, and auto and motorcycle transport. The department became the first city west of the Mississippi to utilize automobiles for police patrol when it purchased a 1906 Auto-Car. In 1907, Chief Wilson reorganized the Detective Bureau and detectives became known as Inspectors, a title borrowed from Scotland Yard. Chief Wilson concurrently created the Bureau of Identification, and Oakland became the first police department west of Chicago to maintain specialized criminal identification files using the French method of Bertillion Records along with fingerprints as a means of identification. Chief Wilson also instituted civil service status for police officers beginning in 1911, ending political patronage in the department. Formalized training was introduced with the opening of a "police school" which included instruction in department regulations, law courses taught by the District Attorney and local judges, and first aid taught by the local Red Cross. By 1914, the city had grown to 216,261 and the department employed 250 officers. Operations expanded to include station houses in the northern and eastern sectors of the city, while headquarters and the central patrol district remained in city hall. By the late 1940s, the central patrol division had moved into its own facility at 14th and Jefferson.

With the national economic collapse of 1929, Oakland's growth declined and revenues fell precipitously. The police department was not exempt, as plans for a new two-way radio system were delayed for a decade and the number of patrol cars was reduced. As World War II approached, the city cooperated with the federal government on essential projects including the construction of the Oakland Army Base and the Naval Supply Center. The police department assisted the military by helping to escort convoys and training military policemen.

The department became integrated during World War II with the 1943 appointment of African American Officers Adrien C. Bridges and Leon S. Daniels. Other African American officers soon joined the ranks, and in 1949, Odell Sylvester, a World War II veteran and 1948 graduate of Cal Berkeley joined the department and rose through the ranks to become the first African American Lieutenant, Captain and Deputy Chief. He was the first African American officer to attain this rank in the state of California. He later became the first African American Chief of the Berkeley Police Department.

The city's economy expanded rapidly during World War II and the immediate post-war years before beginning a long period of decline. During the war, thousands of African Americans migrated to Oakland from the South to work in the shipyards and were later relegated to the ranks of the unemployed as the post-war boom declined. In shipbuilding alone, the number of jobs dropped from over 250,000 to fewer than 12,000 by 1949. As a result, a large number of African American residents were relegated to poverty, and poor, underserved neighborhoods grew. The minority population of Oakland had risen from 5 percent in 1940 to 26 percent by 1960. Inner-city Oakland began to mirror the inner-cities of the east coast, where large swaths of poverty and neglect fostered crime. The police department recognized the city's racial divisions and had begun community relations programs in the late 1940s. By 1955, the department had greatly expanded its academy training and instituted an internal affairs division. In 1956, the department instituted a civil rights training program for all administrative and supervisory personnel, conducted by the Federal Bureau of Investigation.

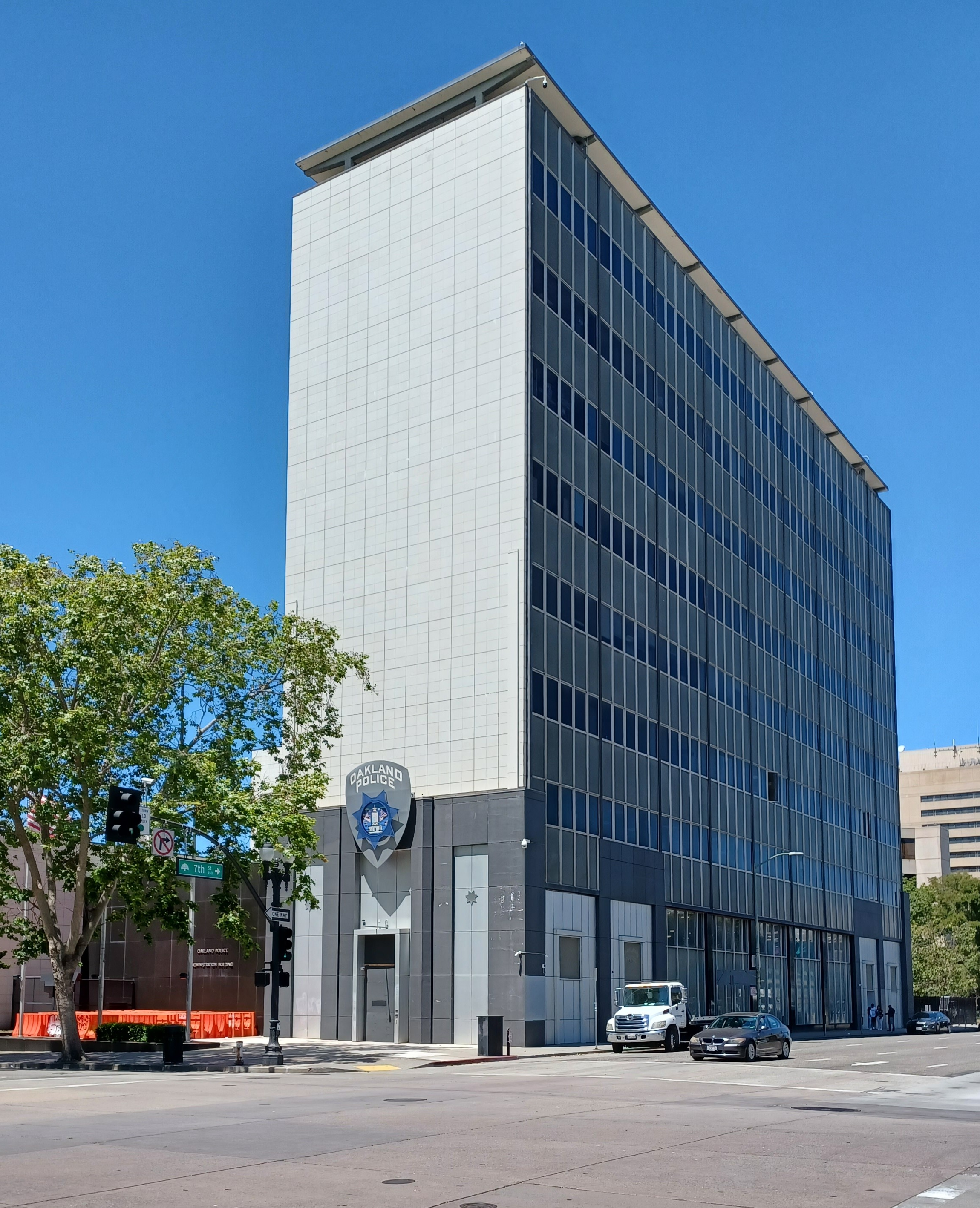
Oakland Police Department building at 455 7th St, pictured in 2023

By 1962, the department centralized operations at the new Police Administration Building at 455 7th St. The old Central, Northern and Eastern stations closed as the economy continued to contract. In 1963, the federal government declared Oakland to be a depressed city. With the closing of the neighborhood stations and continued staffing shortages, officers were less available for routine patrol and were often relegated to answering emergency calls for service.

Echoing many other large U.S. cities, Oakland saw an increase in crime, poverty and increasing civil unrest throughout the 1960s. Despite community outreach programs, racial tensions increased throughout the decade as crime and declining socioeconomic status impacted the African American community the hardest. By the late 1960s, the Black Panther Party for Self-Defense had formed in Oakland and a series of public confrontations with the police garnered national attention. Black Panthers wearing a uniform of black clothes, black leather jackets, and black berets would follow Oakland police patrols while openly carrying statute books and firearms. In October 1967, OPD officer John Frey was shot and killed and officer Cliff Heanes was wounded when they made a traffic stop of a car containing Black Panther co-founder Huey Newton. Newton was wounded in the shootout and was subsequently arrested and tried for murder. He was convicted by a jury of voluntary manslaughter, which was later overturned on appeal. Subsequent re-trials ended without a conviction. In his book "Shadow of the Panther", African American author Hugh Pearson alleged that not long before his death at the hands of West Oakland cocaine dealer Anthony Robinson in 1989, Newton candidly admitted to willfully killing Officer Frey. On April 6, 1968, armed Black Panther members under the direction of Eldridge Cleaver initiated an ambush of Oakland police officers in West Oakland. Cleaver initially claimed that the police had ambushed him and fellow party members, but years later admitted he had planned and led the ambush in retaliation for the assassination of Martin Luther King Jr. in Memphis two days prior. The ensuing shootout lasted over 90 minutes as backup officers rushed to the scene and forced the ambushers to seek cover in the basement of a dilapidated row house near 25th and Union Streets. The shootout resulted in two officers being seriously wounded and party member Bobby Hutton killed. The circumstances of Hutton's death remain in dispute to this day, with the police stating that Hutton was shot as he emerged from a tear-gassed house with a rifle and tried to flee. Cleaver disputed the police account of Hutton's death, saying that Hutton "had his hands in the air until he died."

The tumultuous 1960s and 70s proved a particular policing challenge for the department as the city saw increased social unrest. The Police Administration Building was the scene of several bombings during this time, and the department formed its first SWAT team to counter increasingly heavily armed criminals. George T. Hart was appointed Chief in 1972 and became Oakland's longest-serving Chief of Police. His low key demeanor and insistence on strict adherence to law and departmental regulations proved a steadying influence on the department through this turbulent period. Despite the decline of the Black Panther Party due to infighting and the defection to Cuba by Huey Newton to avoid prosecution for the murder of an 18-year-old prostitute, new unrest emerged in the form of the S.L.A. (responsible for the 1973 murder of Oakland Schools Superintendent Marcus Foster), the Hell's Angels expanding criminal empire headquartered in east Oakland, numerous anti-Vietnam War protests, and most significantly, the burgeoning drug trade and subsequent gang wars. Heroin had become the drug of choice by the 1970s, and notorious drug lords such as Felix "The Cat" Mitchell and his "69 Mob" controlled vast swaths of territory throughout Oakland's numerous housing projects. The murder rate increased steadily during the 1970s as various drug lords battled over territory, with drug-related shootings becoming a regular occurrence.

Despite having been among the first California police departments to initiate integration in the ranks, by 1974, Oakland PD found controversy with a statistical imbalance in minority representation. By this date, the minority population of Oakland had grown to 50 percent, while minority officers represented only 12 percent of the department. To end this disparity, the department entered into the Penn-Stump Consent decree. The resulting affirmative action program was supervised by Chief George Hart, Deputy Chief Odell Sylvester, and Captain James McArthur. The program focused on all identified minority groups within Oakland and included special provisions for the recruitment of female officers.

In 1975, the rank of policewoman was closed to further appointments, resolving an issue the department had handled inconsistently for 60 years. The rank of policewoman had been instituted in 1913 but terminated in 1919 by the office of the mayor. The rank was reintroduced in 1943 but again terminated by 1946. The rank was established again in 1949 and continued until 1975 when the department settled on a permanent policy decreeing that all women hired thereafter would be appointed to the regular rank of police officer.

With the emergence of the crack cocaine epidemic in the 1980s, the rate of violence and murder reached new heights as various drug gangs battled to fill the power vacuum left when Felix Mitchell and rivals like Mickey Moore and other contemporaries were targeted by OPD Vice/Narcotics investigators and subsequently imprisoned. Rudolph "Rudy" Henderson briefly emerged as the city's largest cocaine dealer until he too was arrested, convicted and imprisoned in 1989. The struggle for dominance among drug gangs continued, and the murder rate reached its peak in 1992 when 175 murders were recorded. Likewise, the rate of non-fatal shootings, rape, aggravated assault and robbery was nearly double the national average during this time. The department remained understaffed throughout this period, even as Oakland consistently ranked as one of the top ten most violent cities in the nation on a yearly basis. Establishment of specialized units tasked with interdicting street-level narcotics dealing and tracking and apprehending Part 1 offenders were successful in curtailing gang-related murders, but staffing shortages limited overall effectiveness. The concept of community policing had been introduced as the "Beat Health" program in the 1970s by Chief Hart in an attempt to return to the practice of beat officers taking long-term responsibility for and developing relationships in the neighborhoods they patrolled rather than simply responding to 911 calls. This concept was expanded in the late 1980s under a revamped community policing program which included the re-opening of an Eastern station. This was undertaken in conjunction with an aggressive, proactive approach to street crime in a two-pronged attempt to engage the community and curtail violence. Again, these efforts were hampered by the continual shortage of officers. The city commissioned an independent study on police staffing in the mid-1990s by the non-profit Police Executive Research Foundation, which concluded that Oakland needed a minimum of 1,200 sworn officers to effectively deal with the annual average level of reported crime. Nonetheless, budget shortfalls ensured that sworn staffing remained at an average of 750 to 800 officers thereafter, an average of 1.76 officers per 1000 residents, ranking Oakland near the bottom of major U.S. and California cities in the number of officers per capita.

Upon the retirement of Chief George T. Hart in 1993, Oakland appointed its first African American Chief of Police, Joseph Samuels Jr. He retired in 1999, and three of the next four chiefs were African American. Oakland appointed its first female chief, Anne Kirkpatrick, in 2017.

Each chief has faced chronic understaffing within the department. In an attempt to increase community involvement and address police officer under-staffing, Oakland voters in 2004 passed a major tax increase known as Measure Y. The measure has been largely unsuccessful, as staffing levels remain historically low and crime remains far above the national average.

In February 2020, the Oakland Police Commission, with support from Mayor Libby Schaaf, fired Police Chief Anne Kirkpatrick without cause. In May 2020, Kirkpatrick filed a complaint with the City Attorney's Office, claiming her firing was retaliation for submitting several complaints against the commission during her tenure as Police Chief. Kirkpatrick's complaint outlined several allegations of misconduct by the commission, including commissioners seeking special treatment, and making unlawful attempts to obtain confidential personnel records, and harassing city staff.

in 2016, the most recent year for which full statistics are available, the city of Oakland averaged 763.2 violent crimes per 100,000 residents, compared to the national average of 280.5. This is down from the most recent high of 969.2 per 100,000 residents, which occurred in 2006.

Since its inception, 53 Oakland Police Officers have been killed in the line of duty, the majority by gunfire. The first officer killed in the line of duty was Richard B. Richardson, shot to death by an armed fugitive on October 23, 1867. The most recent officer killed was Paul Carlisle, who died on December 1, 2015, from gunshot wounds sustained in an earlier gun battle. The March 21, 2009, shootings of four Oakland police officers by a wanted rapist and parole violator marked the deadliest day for California law enforcement since the "Newhall Incident" in 1970. The first two officers killed had pulled over the suspect for a routine traffic violation, unaware that the suspect was armed and wanted. The suspect drew a handgun and shot Sgt. Mark Dunakin and Officer John Hege before they could react, killing them on the spot. The suspect fled to a nearby apartment where he armed himself with an assault rifle and ambushed an Oakland Police SWAT team as they attempted to arrest him, killing sergeants Erv Romans and Danial Sakai before he himself was shot to death by other officers. This was also the deadliest attack on U.S. law enforcement since the September 11 attacks. until the 2016 shooting of Dallas police officers, when five officers were killed.

On November 14, 2025, Oakland mayor Barbara Lee appointed Assistant Chief James Beere as interim Oakland Chief of Police, a position which he officially assume on December 5, 2025.

=== Misleading data ===
In 2024, the SF Chronicle reported that Oakland and its police department have published misleading crime data for years.

== Uniform and equipment ==
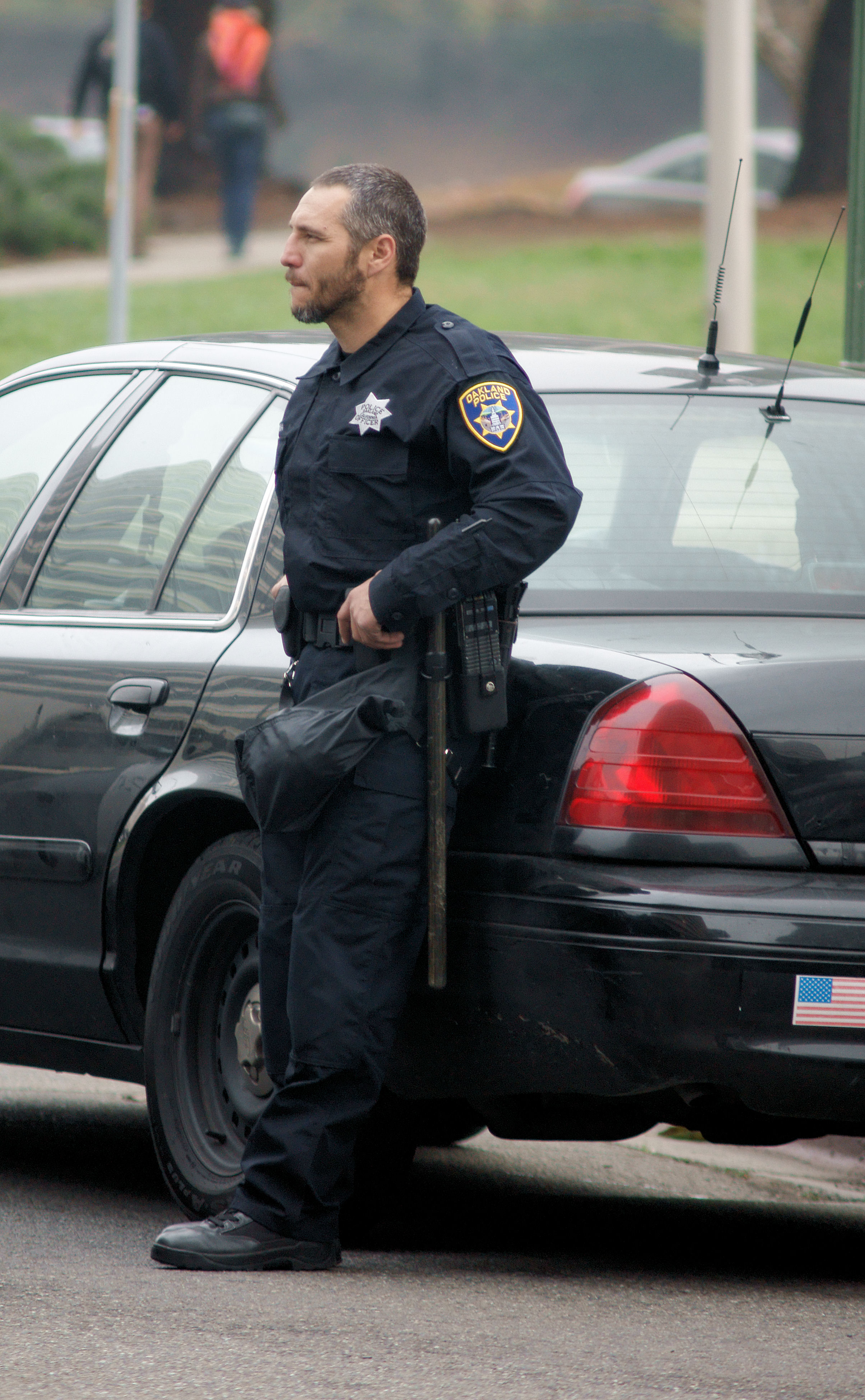
An officer of the Oakland Police Department Special Operations Section in Utility Uniform, January 2009

The uniform of the Oakland Police department consists of a dark navy-blue "tropical weight" wool shirt with matching dark navy wool twill trousers with a 1-inch medium blue stripe along the side seam. A sterling silver seven-point star is affixed to the left breast above the pocket, each with a distinctive 3 digit enameled number and bearing the words "Police Officer, Oakland California". Nametags are worn on the right breast above the pocket. Police officers and sergeants wear sterling silver stars, while higher ranks wear gold stars. Additionally, ranks from sergeant and up are hand-engraved with scrolling, and enameled rank designation. Officers are issued a "Class A style" navy blue wool round police cap with cap badge indicating rank, usually worn only with the full dress uniform. Navy blue BDU style uniforms are also authorized. Plain black leather duty belts with matching holster and accessories are issued. Black nylon duty gear is worn optionally by some officers. Navy blue nylon jackets are issued for cooler weather while black leather bomber style jackets may be purchased for optional wear. For crowd control, OPD officers normally wear helmets and BDU uniforms.

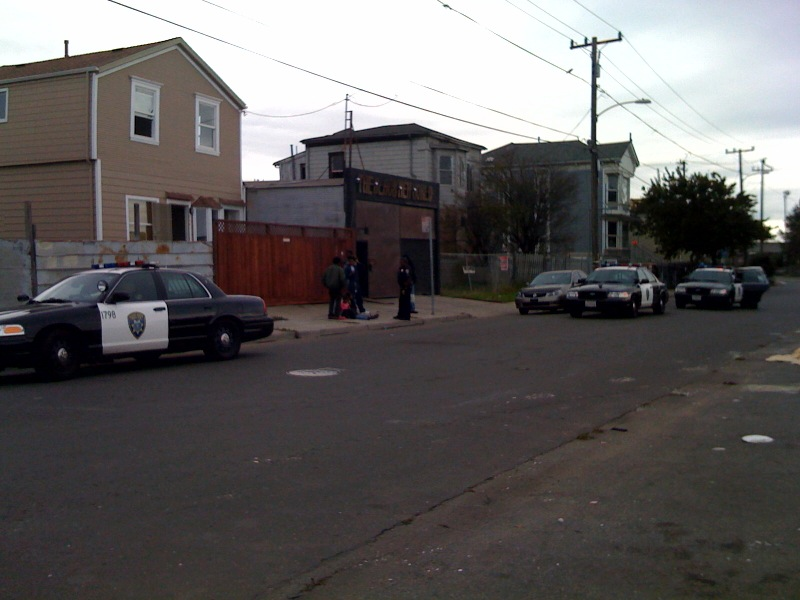
Patrol vehicles of the Oakland Police Department

=== Weapons ===
Oakland officers are issued Glock 17 9mm caliber handguns. Less Lethal weapons issued/authorized for use by officers include Batons (Straight Wood Baton, Straight ASP Expandable Baton, Short Billy), OC Pepper Spray, bean-bag shotgun rounds, and Tasers. Cruisers may be armed with Remington 870 shotguns. The OPD SWAT Team is equipped with Colt M4 rifles.

=== Vehicles, air, and marine support ===
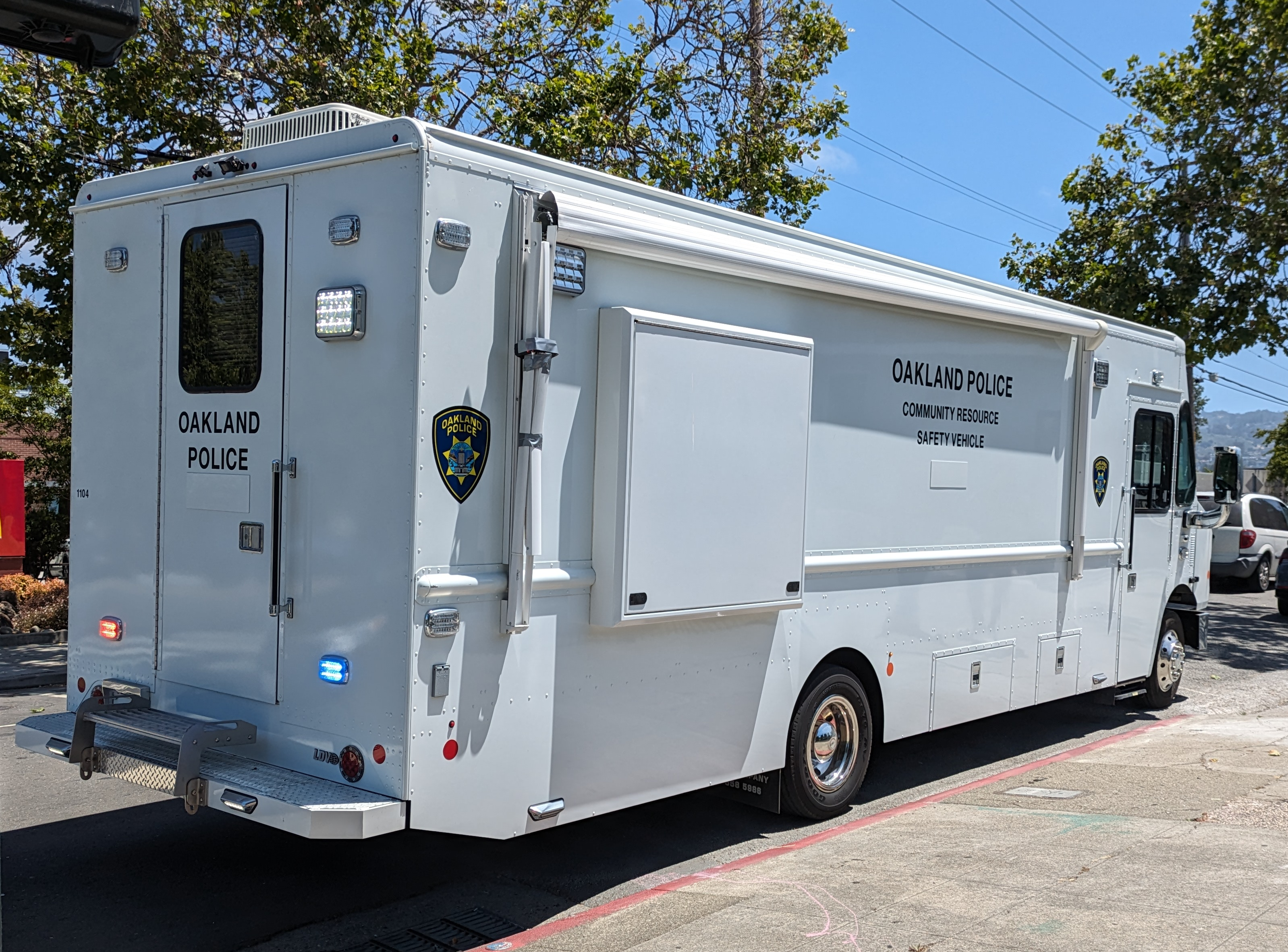
Oakland police bus

OPD deploys black and white patrol vehicles, primarily the Ford Crown Victoria Police Interceptors and Ford Police Interceptor sport utility vehicles. The Traffic Division deploys Harley Davidson FLHP Road King motorcycles. The helicopters for the Oakland Police are McDonnell Douglas MD369E models, equipped with forward Looking Infra-Red systems. They are nicknamed ARGUS after a character in Greek mythology. The department also operates a marine support unit which patrols the estuary and port of Oakland facilities, conducting critical infrastructure inspections, underwater searches with side scan sonar, and underwater remote vehicle searches.

== Rank structure ==
Title	Insignia
Chief	
Assistant Chief	
Deputy Chief	
Captain	
Lieutenant	
Sergeant	
Field Training Officer	
Police Officer	

Additional Positions
Title	Insignia
Acting Sergeant	

=== Police Chief, Assistant Chief, Deputy Chief ===
Chief of the Oakland Police Department is an office held by the highest-ranking member of the Oakland Police Department. Oakland has had 13 police chiefs (including interim chiefs) since 1993. For a full list of past and current police chiefs, visit the Chief of the Oakland Police Department page.

The ranks of Deputy Chief, Assistant Chief and Chief are appointed. The Assistant Chief as second-in-command. Deputy Chiefs command the Bureaus of Field Services (Area 1 and Area 2), Criminal Investigations and Services.

=== Sergeant, Lieutenant, and Captain ===
Each bureau contains various divisions, each typically commanded by a Captain. A Lieutenant may the head of a division in lieu of a Captain under certain conditions. Uniformed Lieutenants generally command patrol sectors and serve as watch-commanders, with Uniformed Sergeants functioning as line-supervisors of squads of officers. Lieutenants assigned to the Criminal Investigation Division serve as unit supervisors, with Sergeants assigned as supervising investigators of Part 1 felony offenses, primarily in the Homicide, Sexual Assault, and Robbery Sections.

=== Police Officer ===
All potential candidates for the position of Police Officer must undergo a written examination, oral board panel and review, physical agility testing, psychological screening, drug testing and intensive background investigation. The number of candidates accepted is less than 25 percent of overall applicants. New officers are hired as probationary employees at the rank of Police Trainee. Upon successful completion of the six-month police academy, they are appointed as a probationary Police Officer. Upon successful completion of 6 months of field training and an additional 1-year probationary period, they attain their full rank.

== Officers killed in the line of duty ==
As of 2015 the department has lost 52 officers killed in the line of duty, 33 of whom died as a result of gunfire. The 2009 shootings of Oakland police officers took place on Saturday, March 21, 2009, when four Oakland, California police officers were killed by a felon wanted on a no-bail warrant for forcible rape of a minor as well as a parole violation. The suspect shot and killed Traffic Division Sgt. Mark Dunakin and Officer John Hege when they stopped him for a traffic violation. They were unaware he was armed and wanted, and he drew a handgun and shot both officers before they could react. He fled to a nearby apartment and staged an ambush of the police SWAT team as they attempted to arrest him, killing officers Ervin Romans and Daniel Sakai before he too was killed by police gunfire.

== Department demographics ==
The Police Department makes demographic data available to the public via a monthly staffing report. However, as of June 2021, the most recent Staffing Report published on the OSD City Site was nearly 3 years old.

=== Oakland residents ===
As of July 2018, 10% of Oakland Police officers were Oakland city residents. 34% of officers reside in Alameda County (inclusive of Oakland), 34% of officers reside in Contra Costa County, followed by Solano County at 9%.

=== Gender ===
As of June 2018, Oakland employed 97 Female officers (13%) and 641 Male officers (87%).

Gender as of July 2018
	2007 Natl Police Avg	2018 OPD Avg
Female	14.3%	13.1%
Male	85.7%	86.9%

=== Race/ethnicity ===
Race/Ethnicity as of July 2018
	2010 Census Oakland Population	2018 Oakland Police Dept
White	34.5%	38.3%
Black	28%	16.9%
Asian	16.8%	16.9%
Hispanic	25.4%	25.2%
Other	-	2.7%

== Budget ==
The Oakland Police Department and Police Commission account for roughly 20% of the City of Oakland's annual expenditures, according to the Proposed 2019-2021 Oakland City Budget.

City of Oakland Police-Related Budget
	Actual		Proposed	
	2017–18	2018–19	2019–20	2020–21
Police Department	$289.4m	$288.3m	$318.3m	$329.8m
Police Commission	$2.2m	$2.9m	$4.1m	$4.2m
TOTAL	$291.6m	$291.2m	$322.4m	$334m

=== Salary ===
As of 2025, the entry-level pay for an Oakland police officer starts at $106,355 per year. As of 2023, average total pay for an Oakland police officer is $215,940 ($324,583 including benefits). The highest earning department employee, Sergeant Of Police Francisco Javier Negrete, received $604,326 in pay ($879,284 including benefits).

=== Staffing ===
The staffing of the Oakland Police Department has varied widely, particularly since 1995, due to budget cuts and rising attrition rates. Sworn personnel ranged from a low of 646 officers in 1996 to a high of 814 in 2002, and back to a low again of 646 by 2012. The department's strength declined 21 percent from 2009 to 2012 alone.

On Friday, August 15, 2007, Oakland swore in 22 new graduates from the department's 161st Basic Police Academy, increasing the ranks of the department to 741 filled positions, the most since 1999. At least five veteran officers were expected to be granted disability retirements by the end of the month and up to 20 more were expected to leave by the end of the year. Forty-one potential Oakland officers were in the Oakland Police Academy that graduated in January 2008, and another academy was scheduled to start in October. Even with that graduation, there were still more than 60 vacancies in the department where the authorized strength increased by 63 to 802 officers after the passage of Measure Y in November 2004.

On July 14, 2010, Oakland laid off 80 police officers reducing the total officers from 776 to 695. 24 of those sworn officers worked in patrol. The rest of the officers performed other duties, including community policing activities.

In 2018, Oakland employed 747 officers. As of November 2025, Oakland employed only 625 officers.

Oakland has eight detectives assigned to investigate robberies. There are six Special Victims Unit investigators. Oakland has fourteen police dog teams. There are 62 members on Oakland's SWAT team, all of whom serve in other assignments until called upon for emergency situations.

== Allegations of abuse ==
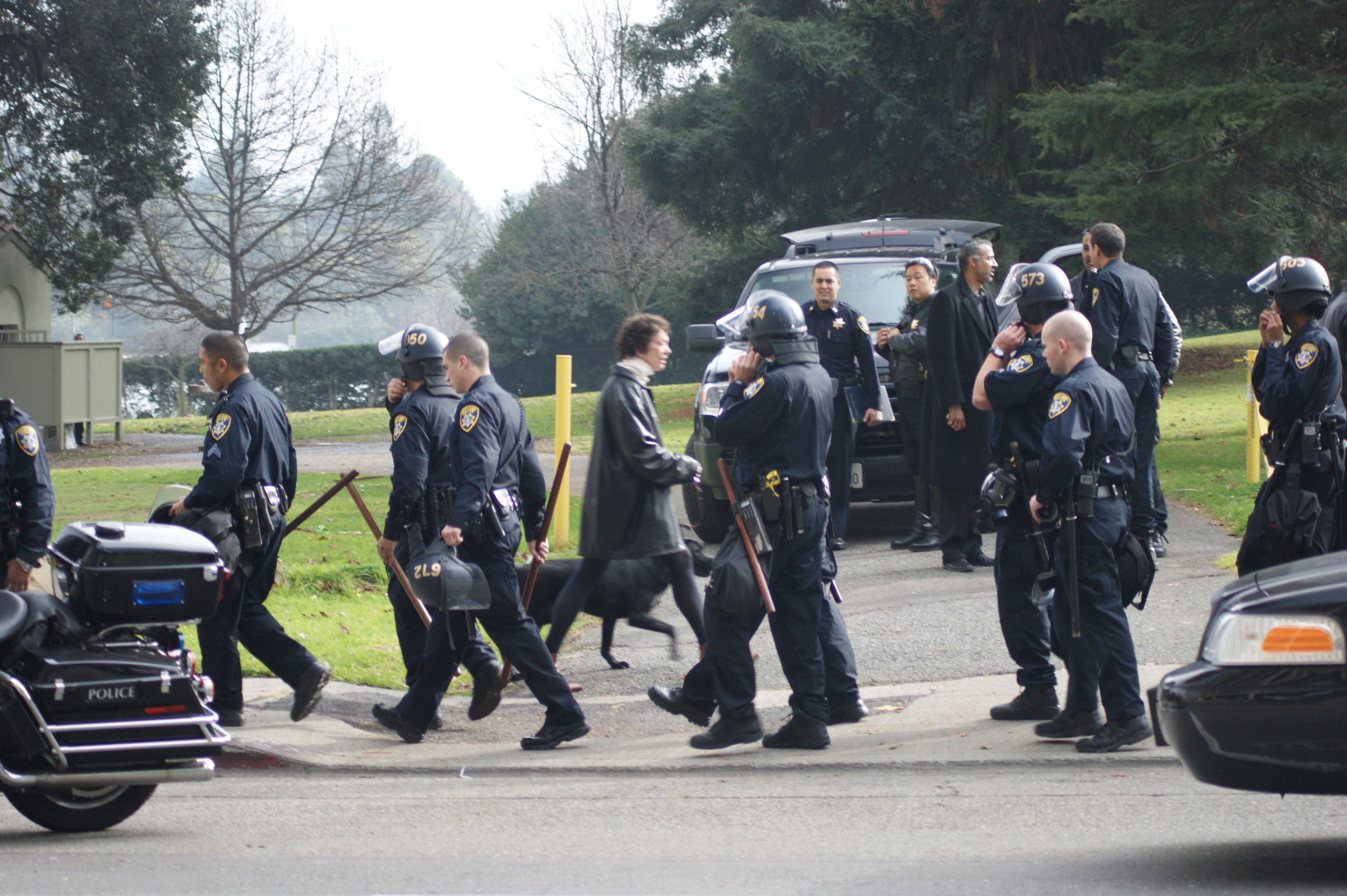
Oakland Police officers dressed in riot gear in response to protests against the BART Police shooting of Oscar Grant

In 1991, the City of Oakland paid $42,000 to settle a lawsuit brought by rapper Tupac Shakur after officers allegedly beat him during a confrontation after stopping him for a traffic infraction.

In July 2000, a former rookie Oakland Police officer alleged that four veteran officers known as the "Riders" had over the past four years made false arrests, planted evidence, used excessive force, and falsified police reports. Scores of drug cases were dropped because of potentially tainted evidence. The alleged leader of the Riders, Frank Vazquez, fled to Mexico shortly after his criminal indictment and remains a fugitive from justice. The other three officers were indicted by the Alameda County District Attorney and tried twice in Oakland Superior Court. The first trial resulted in acquittal on 8 charges and a hung jury on 27 charges. A second trial acquitted officer Hornung, and was deadlocked on most of the charges for the other two officers. The Riders' actions resulted in Oakland settling a federal civil rights case, Allen v. City of Oakland, for nearly $11 million. As part of the Negotiated Settlement Agreement, the Oakland Police Department is required to make major reforms to ensure constitutional policing. The court appointed an independent monitor to oversee implementation of these reforms.

In 2008, Oakland agreed to pay $2 million to 16 women, all Asian, who alleged being groped, harassed, or victimized by a member of the Oakland Police Department. After a criminal trial, former Officer Richard Valerga was sentenced to six months in jail.

In 2010, Oakland agreed to pay $6.5 million to individuals alleging that the Oakland police illegally obtained search warrants based on false or misleading information.

In 2011, Oakland Police came under further criticism for its handling of Occupy Oakland. Occupier Scott Olsen was seriously injured during a melee when struck in the head by an object that some claim was a bean bag round or tear gas canister fired by an Oakland officer. That allegation has to date remain unproven.

Oakland paid a total of $57 million during 2001–2011 to alleged victims of police abuse—the largest sum of any city in California during that time.

=== Resignation of three chiefs and civilian control (2016) ===
In June 2016, 14 Oakland Police officers were alleged to have been involved in a sex scandal involving a teenaged prostitute, including some while she was allegedly a minor. The scandal was revealed by an investigation triggered by a suicide note written by Oakland Police Officer Brendan O'Brien, who was one of the implicated officers alleged to have repeatedly had sex with the girl while she was a minor.

The scandal led to the resignation of Chief Sean Whent, and the subsequent appointment and voluntary resignations of two subsequent candidates, one from outside the department who elected to resign and one from within who elected to remain a captain instead. The department was under civilian control from June 17, 2016, through February 27, 2017, while the city conducted an intensive recruiting and hiring process for the position. Chief Anne Kirkpatrick was sworn in on February 27, 2017. At a press conference, Oakland Mayor Libby Schaaf delivered an aggressive repudiation of the Oakland Police Department and its staff, while announcing another new scandal, this one involving racist and homophobic text messages allegedly by African-American Oakland Police Department officers.

As of August 10, 2016, the two African American officers who allegedly exchanged racist/inappropriate text messages were found to have violated department policy and as a result, received suspensions and mandatory retraining.

As of February 1, 2018, the charges against all but three officers in the sex scandal had been dropped by the Alameda County District Attorney or dismissed by judges. Of the three remaining officers, one pleaded guilty to misdemeanor charges of providing confidential police information to unauthorized recipients, one for failure to report misconduct, and one for engaging in a lewd act.

== Police Commission ==
The Oakland Police Commission was created following the 2016 passage of Measure LL, which received the support of more than 80% of Oakland voters. The Police Commission oversees the Oakland Police Department's policies, practices, and customs to meet national standards of constitutional policing, as well as the Community Police Review Agency (CPRA) which investigates police misconduct and recommends discipline.

The Police Commission has seven regular and two alternate members. All commissioners are Oakland residents and serve in a volunteer capacity. It has 17 Full-Time Employees (FTE) - primarily dedicated to the CPRA, and annual expenditures of $4.1 million in the 2019–20 Fiscal Year.

=== 2017-2019 City Audit of the Police Commission ===
In June 2020, the City Auditor released a Performance Audit of the Police Commission and Community Police Review Agency (CPRA). The report was critical of the commission, and delivered 5 key findings and :

1. The Commission has implemented 2 OPD policy changes in a 2-year period, and has not fully implemented 36 of its 105 requirements in the City Charter and Municipal Code.
2. The Commissions powers & duties should be clarified.
  - The Commission involved itself in matters that limit its ability to address higher priority issues.
  - The Commission has difficulty managing its meetings and has not adopted a code of conduct
  - Commissioners have inappropriately directed staff and made disparaging comments to staff and the public.
3. The CPRA has not fully implemented 8 of the 39 requirements in the City Charter and Municipal Code.
4. The CPRA's investigative processes are not formalized, and the Commission & CPRA have not defined the type of oversight they should provide
5. The City Council should consider amending several of the Commission’s City Charter and Municipal Code Requirements.

Oakland Police Commission(as of October 2024)
Name	Position	Start of Term	End of Term
Ricardo Garcia Acosta	Commissioner	Oct 16, 2023	Oct 16, 2025
Shane Thomas-Williams	Commissioner	Oct 17, 2024	Oct 16, 2026
Samuel Dawit	Commissioner	Oct 17, 2024	Oct 16, 2026
Shawana Booker	Commissioner	Oct 17, 2024	Oct 16, 2026
Angela Jackson-Castain	Commissioner	Oct 17, 2024	Oct 16, 2026
Wilson Riles	Commissioner	Oct 17, 2023	Oct 16, 2026
Omar Farmer	Alternate Commissioner	May 8, 2024	Oct 16, 2025
Mykah Montgomery	Chief of Staff	N/A	N/A

The Oakland Police Commission meets on the 2nd and 4th Thursday of each month. Meetings are held at 5:30 p.m. in Council Chamber. All meeting dates and times are subject to change. Meeting agendas can be accessed on their public website.

=== Community Police Review Agency (CPRA) ===
In 1980, the Citizens' Police Review Board (CPRB) was established to handle complaints against OPD misconduct, fact finding, and advisory reports to the City Administrator.

In 1995, the City Council expanded the CPRB's responsibility to include investigations of use of force and bias based protected status.

In 2002, the City Council expanded the CPRB's responsibility to include all complaints against police officers, option to hold hearings, and ability to review confidential OPD records in private session.

In 2016, voters passed Measure LL to establish the Police Commission and replace the Citizens’ Police Review Board (CPRB) with the Community Police Review Agency (CPRA). John Alden is the Executive Director for the Community Police Review Agency effective Monday, July 29, 2019.

== See also ==
- List of law enforcement agencies in California
- Crime in Oakland, California
- 2009 shootings of Oakland police officers
- The Force (2017 film)
