= Baltimore Strike =

Baltimore Strike may refer to one of several strikes that have happened in Baltimore

- Baltimore railroad strike of 1877
- Baltimore police strike
- Baltimore municipal strike of 1974
