= Baltimore riots =

Baltimore riots can refer to several incidents of civil unrest in the history of Baltimore, Maryland, US. It generally refers to the Baltimore Riot of 1861 (also known as the "Pratt Street Riots"), where a mob of Confederate Southern sympathizers attacked newly raised Union state militia troops transiting through the town on April 18–19, 1861 in some of the first bloodshed of the American Civil War.

It may also refer to:

- Baltimore doctors' riots (1807)
- 1812 Baltimore riots
- Baltimore bank riot (1835)
- Know-Nothing Riot of 1856
- Baltimore election riot of 1857
- Baltimore election riot of 1858
- Baltimore election riot of 1859
- Baltimore railroad strike of 1877, strikes and riots which took place as part of the Great Railroad Strike of 1877
- Baltimore riot of 1919, part of Red Summer
- Baltimore riot of 1968, one of a series of nationwide riots in response to the death of national civil rights activist Martin Luther King, Jr.
- 2015 Baltimore protests, a series of protests and riots in response to the death of Freddie Gray in police custody

== See also ==
- Baltimore, Maryland
- List of riots
