= Timeline of strikes in 1974 =

Strikes in 1974

In 1974, a number of labour strikes, labour disputes, and other industrial actions occurred.

== Background ==
A labour strike is a work stoppage caused by the mass refusal of employees to work. This can include wildcat strikes, which are done without union authorisation, and slowdown strikes, where workers reduce their productivity while still carrying out minimal working duties. It is usually a response to employee grievances, such as low pay or poor working conditions. Strikes can also occur to demonstrate solidarity with workers in other workplaces or pressure governments to change policies.

== Timeline ==
=== Continuing strikes from 1973 ===
- 1973–74 American truckers' strikes
- 1973–74 Brookside strike, 13-month strike by coal miners in Harlan County, Kentucky, United States.
- Farah strike
- 1973–76 LIP strikes, at the LIP in France.
- Navnirman Andolan. Student-led movement in Gujarat, India, against corruption, including strikes.

=== February ===
- UK miners' strike (1974)

=== March ===
- Bihar Movement. Student-led movement against corruption in Bihar, India, including strikes.

=== April ===
- 1974 Elliot Lake miners strike. 14-day wildcat strike by uranium miners at the Denison Mine in Canada over safety concerns.
- 1974 Japanese transit strike

=== May ===
- 1974 Dublin bus strike, 9-week strike by bus drivers in Dublin.
- 1974 Imperial Typewriters strike. 3-month strike by East African Asian women workers for Imperial Typewriters in the United Kingdom over discrimination.
- 1974 railway strike in India. 20-day strike by Indian Railways workers, represented by the All India Railwaymen's Federation, for an eight-hour working day.
- Ulster Workers' Council strike. General strike by Northern Irish unionists opposed to the Sunningdale Agreement.

=== June ===
- 1974 Baltimore municipal strike

=== July ===
- Baltimore police strike
- 1974 Lecumberri Prison hunger strike, hunger strike by American and Canadian inmates held at the Lecumberri Prison on charges of drug smuggling.
- 1974 NFL strike. Strike by National Football League players in the United States, represented by the NFL Players Association, over the Rozelle Rule.

=== November ===
- 1974 UMW Bituminous coal strike. 28-day strike led by the United Mine Workers of America.
