= 1835 Baltimore bank riot =

Violent 1835 reaction to a bank failure

Coordinates: 39.2908°N 76.6132°W

The Baltimore bank riot of 1835 took place in Baltimore, the major port city of Maryland. It was a violent reaction to the failure of the Bank of Maryland in 1834. Thousands of citizens had lost millions of dollars in savings. The riot, which lasted from 6 to 9 August, attacked the homes and property of a number of former directors of the bank, who had been accused of financial misconduct and fraud, as well as the federal district courthouse located on Battle Monument Square. The Baltimore bank riot was one of the most violent and destructive events of civic unrest in any American city prior to the Civil War.

Rioters destroyed many of the homes of the city's wealthiest and most prominent citizens, and much valuable property was smashed or burned, but was later restored. The authorities were unable to control the violence and effectively surrendered the city to the mob, which was actively or passively supported by numerous bystanders. The state of Maryland later paid $100,000 in compensation to persons who had lost property in the rioting.

== Background ==
The closure of the Bank of Maryland on 29 March 1834, combined with the failure of other financial institutions, resulted in the loss of millions of dollars in deposits held by individual citizens. The bank's creditors awaited a financial settlement, but after 17 months without a result, many had lost patience. They would soon turn to violence.

== Riot ==
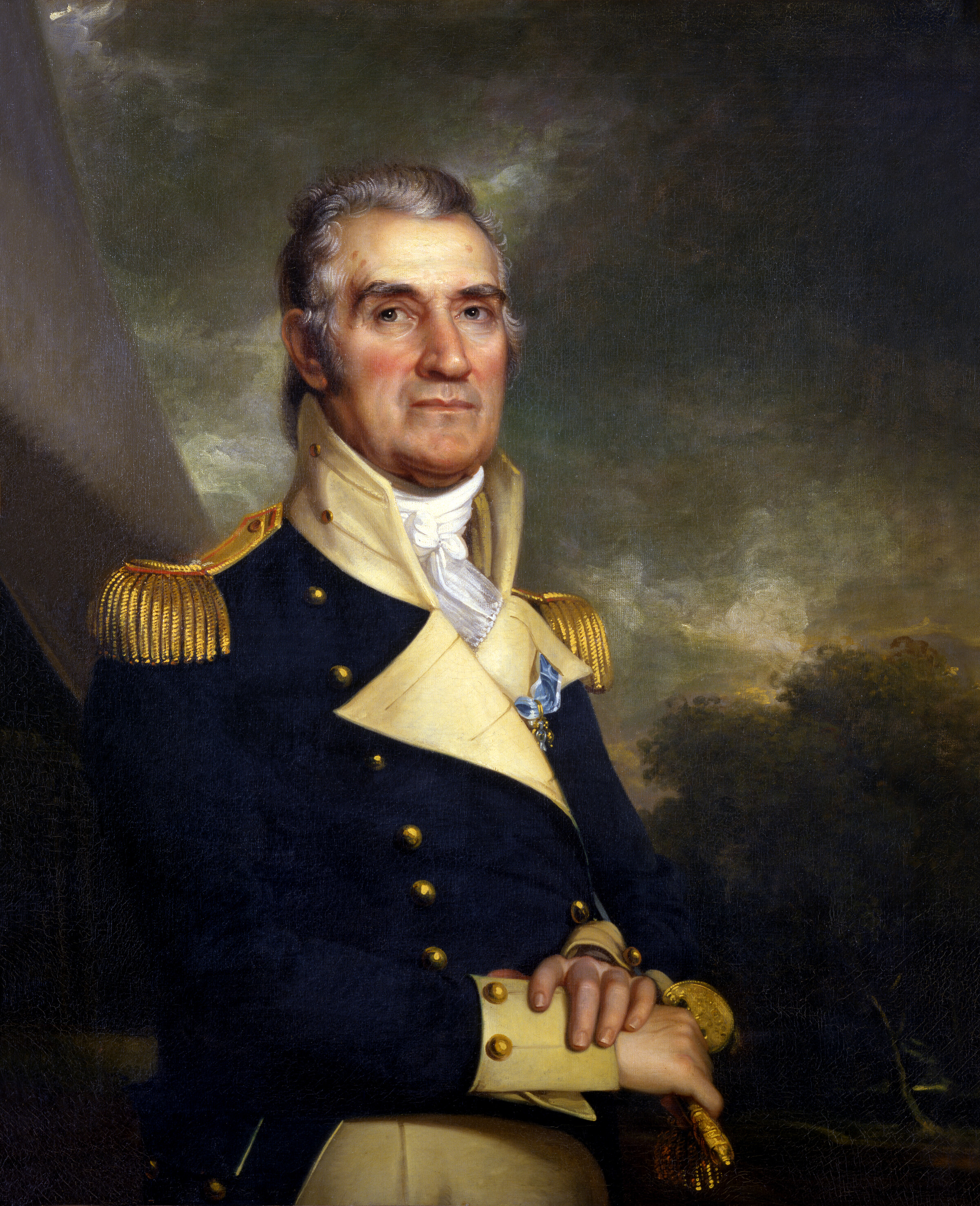
Mayor Samuel Smith

On Thursday, August 6, 1835, a small crowd approached bank director and U.S. Senator Reverdy Johnson's (1796–1876) home (previously mansion/townhouse of James Buchanan, built 1799 opposite old Courthouse Square) on Battle Monument Square, on the northwest corner of North Calvert and East Fayette Streets in Baltimore. They broke his windows and left. Anticipating further disorder, Mayor of Baltimore Jesse Hunt and other citizens began to guard Johnson's home. A hostile crowd returned on the evening of Friday, August 7, and broke more windows, despite the mayor's presence. Mayor Hunt addressed the mob and persuaded them to disperse.

Again anticipating further disturbance, Mayor Jesse Hunt summoned thirty armed horsemen as a militia to form a cordon across the entrance to Battle Monument Square. The next evening, a large crowd gathered in Baltimore Street and marched north on Calvert toward the mayor and his guard. Unable to break through, the crowd moved to the home of Judge John Glenn, another bank director, where they smashed windows, broke through a barricaded front door, threw furniture into the street, and tore down the entire front wall. Police arrived and fired into the mob, but the rioters refused to disperse.

On Sunday, August 9, the mob returned to the Johnson home, this time overpowering the guard and causing further destruction, making a bonfire in the street out of Johnson's valuable law library. Having taken full control of the town, the mob continued its destruction against the homes of bank director John B. Morris, Mayor Hunt, Evan T. Ellicott, a Captain Bentzinger, and one "Captain Willy", who had protested the mob's activities.

In an effort to resolve the situation, the mayor and advisers held a mass meeting at the large, domed "Merchants' Exchange" building, (designed by famed architect Benjamin Henry Latrobe, which housed various Federal offices, courts, post office and maritime businesses) on South Gay between Water and East Lombard streets. Mayor Hunt resigned after having lost the confidence of Baltimore citizens. In his place the 83-year-old General Sam Smith (1752–1839), former senator and mayor, hero of the Revolution at Fort Mifflin and of Baltimore's defenses during the Battle of Baltimore in the War of 1812, took over the government of the city.

Smith organized volunteers to march to Howard's Park (and Woods) at "Belvedere," the estate of recently deceased Col. John Eager Howard (1752–1827), commander of the famed "Maryland Line" regiment of the Continental Army in the Revolution. This was north of the town and the site of the recently completed Washington Monument. A great crowd responded, receiving orders to arm themselves and assemble at City Hall (then located in the former Peale Museum), located on Holliday Street between East Saratoga and Lexington streets. At 3,000 in number, Smith's army of volunteers outnumbered the mob and were able to take control. Smith had already sent a call for help to the state capital of Annapolis and Washington, D.C. for federal troops. By the time, these reinforcements arrived, Smith had dispersed the Baltimore mob and the city was quiet.

== Aftermath ==
The leaders of the mob were identified, brought to trial, fined, and imprisoned. Those whose property was destroyed filed suit against the State of Maryland for its failure to protect them. They won their cases and received a total of $100,000 in compensation.

== Legacy ==
The Baltimore bank riot preceded the disruption that accompanied the later Panic of 1837, a national financial crisis. It resulted in suffering of many citizens and damaged the reputations of the administration of President Andrew Jackson and his successor Martin van Buren.

== See also ==
- A History of Money and Banking in the United States
- Baltimore riots (disambiguation)
- List of incidents of civil unrest in Baltimore
- List of incidents of civil unrest in the United States
