= Frank Battaglia =

American police chief

- Police career
- Country: United States
- Department: Baltimore Police Department
- Rank: Commissioner

Frank Battaglia is a former Baltimore Police Department officer who was commissioner of the department between 1981 and 1984.

== Biography ==
Battaglia was the only Italian-American police commissioner of Baltimore, controlling a police department previously dominated by Irish-American police officers during a time period nicknamed the "Holy Roman Empire." Battaglia would lose the post for a consultant position in 1984 to Bishop L. Robinson as Mayor Donald Schaefer shifted control of the department to the city's majority African American community. It was under Battaglia that former BPD officer Gary D'Addario was elevated to the rank of lieutenant. D'Addario is best known as the shift commander featured in David Simon's Homicide: A Year on the Killing Streets book and was the inspiration for the character of Al Giardello seen on NBC's Homicide: Life on the Street. During the Baltimore riot of 1968, Battaglia was ranked as a Lieutenant Colonel and was the Department's official Field Force Commander.

Police appointments
| Preceded by Donald Pomerleau | Commissioner of the Baltimore Police Department; 1981-1984 | Succeeded by Bishop Robinson |
