= Bishop Robinson (police officer) =

American police commissioner (1927–2014)

Bishop L. Robinson
- Born: January 16, 1927; Baltimore, Maryland
- Died: January 6, 2014 (aged 86); Towson, Maryland
- Police career
- Country: United States
- Department: Baltimore Police Department
- Service years: 1952–1987
- Rank: Sworn in as an Officer – 1952 – Sergeant – 1964 – Lieutenant – 1969 – Captain – 1971 – Major – 1973 – Lieutenant Colonel – 1974 – Colonel – 1975 – Deputy Commissioner – 1978 – Commissioner – 1984

Bishop Lee Robinson (January 16, 1927 – January 6, 2014), was the first African American commissioner of the Baltimore Police Department. He was the police commissioner from 1984 until 1987.

== Biography ==
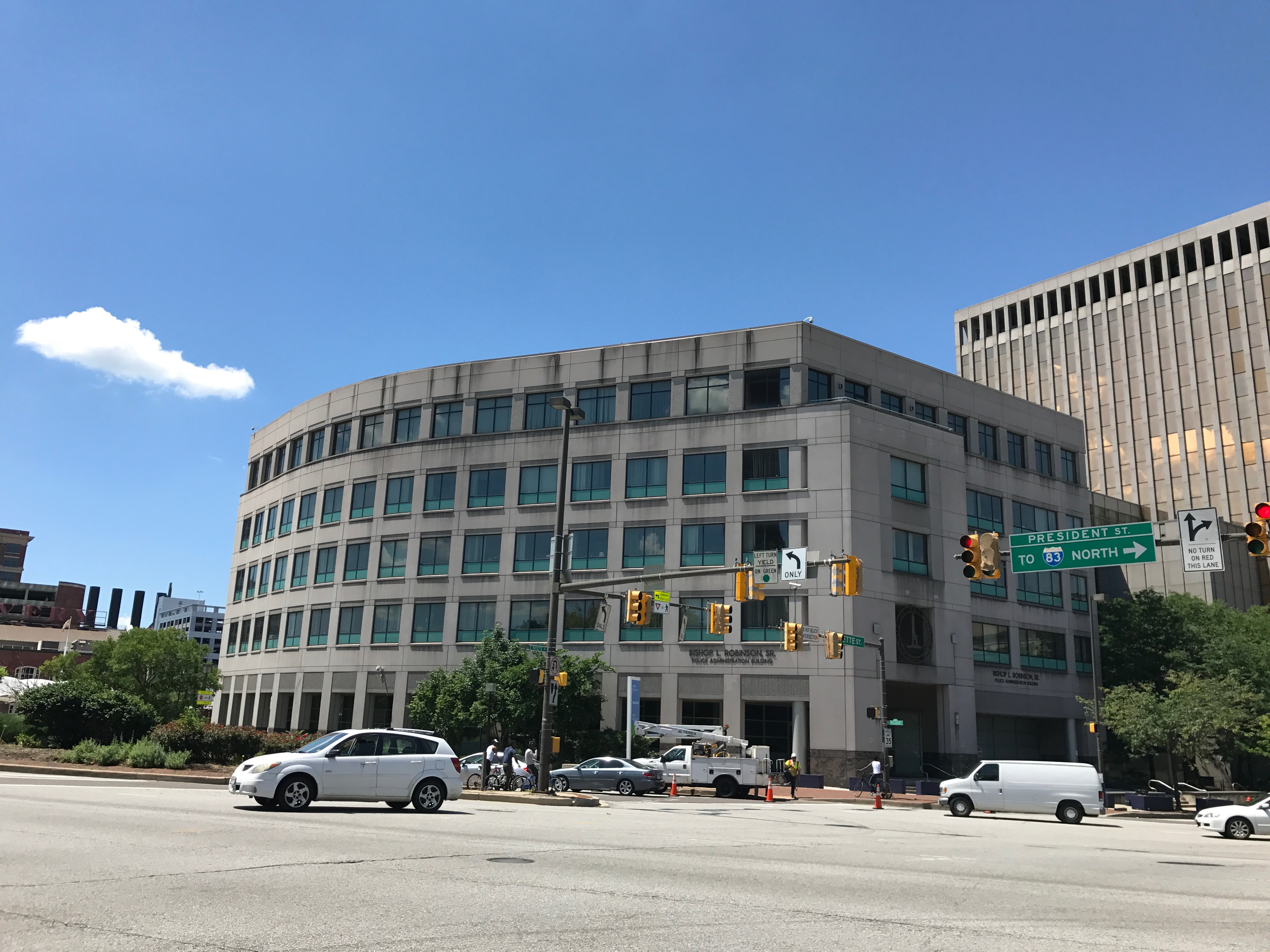
The Bishop L. Robinson Sr. Police Administration Building in Baltimore at 601 East Fayette Street

A graduate of Douglass High School, Coppin State University and the University of Baltimore school of law, Robinson joined the department in 1952, earned the rank of sergeant in 1964, Lieutenant in 1969, Captain in 1971, Major in 1973, Lt. Colonel in 1974, Colonel in 1975, Deputy Commissioner of Operations in 1978 and Commissioner in 1984. Robinson also represented the Baltimore Police Department in the founding of NOBLE, a national organization of African American police officers from various American cities in 1976, and rose to the rank of commissioner in 1984.

For Robinson's first 14 years in the department until 1966, African American officers were quarantined in rank, not allowed to patrol in white neighborhoods, and barred from the use of squad cars during a time period where the Civil Rights Movement, Vietnam War, and Black Power movements took place. Robinson was elevated to the command of Commissioner in a department long dominated by Irish American officers and briefly dominated by Italian American officers as a means of giving African American officers control of the department as Baltimore City became solidly Majority African American.

Following his service as Baltimore Police Commissioner, he served as Secretary of the Maryland Department of Public Safety and Correctional Services from 1987 to 1997 in the Cabinet of Governors William Donald Schaefer and Parris Glendening. Despite the urging of Schaefer, Robinson opted not to run for Mayor of Baltimore in the 1999 mayoral election. He subsequently served as Secretary of the Maryland Department of Juvenile Justice in the Cabinet of Governor Glendenning from 2000 to 2003.

Robinson died on January 6, 2014, at the age of 86. He had developed Alzheimer's disease.

Police appointments
Preceded by Frank Battaglia	Commissioner of the Baltimore Police Department; 1984–1987	Succeeded by Edward J. Tilghman
