= Baltimore police strike =

1974 labor action

- Two officers on strike carry signs with uniformed officers nearby
- Date: July 11, 1974 – July 17, 1974
- Location: Baltimore, Maryland, United States
- Goals: Wage increases
- Methods: Strikes, protests, demonstrations

Parties
| American Federation of State, County and Municipal Employees | City of Baltimore |

Lead figures
| George P. Hoyt; Thomas Rapanotti | Marvin Mandel; Donald Pomerleau |

Number
| 1,500 strikers | |

Casualties and losses
| None | None |

The Baltimore Police Strike was a 1974 labor action conducted by officers of the Baltimore Police Department. Striking officers sought better wages and changes to BPD policy. They also expressed solidarity with Baltimore municipal workers, who were in the midst of an escalating strike action that began on July 1. On July 7, police launched a campaign of intentional misbehavior and silliness; on July 11 they began a formal strike. The department reported an increase in fires and looting, and the understaffed BPD soon received support from Maryland State Police. The action ended on July 15, when union officials negotiated an end to both strikes. The city promised (and delivered) police officers a wage increase in 1975, but refused amnesty for the strikers. Police Commissioner Donald Pomerleau revoked the union's collective bargaining rights, fired its organizers, and pointedly harassed its members.

The Baltimore action was one of a handful police strikes in the United States since the Boston Police Strike of 1919, and was followed by a wave of police unrest in U.S. cities. The action was also test case for the American Federation of State, County and Municipal Employees (AFSCME), which was rapidly growing in size and strength but had not had much success in unionizing police officers.

== Background ==
=== Police unionization in Baltimore ===
City officials opposed the organization of police as a group of workers, fearing the breakdown of order that might result from police strikes. However, Baltimore had a high proportion of minority and pro-union officers. Police officers who wanted to unionize met in secret for years before voting in 1966 to form Police Local 1195, a chapter of AFSCME. One of Local 1195's key leaders was Thomas Rapanotti—a labor organizer who worked in a coal mine, then at Martin Aircraft, then for AFSCME. Rapanotti expanded the union in Baltimore and made inroads into surrounding counties.

The Fraternal Order of Police (FOP) immediately presented itself as a competing union. FOP Lodge #3, which still exists, is independent from other types of workers and less militant as a labor group.

=== Conflict with Pomerleau ===
Baltimore's Police Commissioner, Donald D. Pomerleau, was particularly hostile to the idea of a police union. He repeatedly declined requests (from Baltimore's AFSCME Local 44 as well as from within BPD) to recognize Local 1195, even when much of the police force had joined.

Local 1195 and its allies in organized labor voiced many complaints against Pomerleau. In addition to criticizing Pomerleau's changes to department policy, they accused him of harassing and intimidating union leaders. The AFL–CIO called his actions 'union-busting'. In 1968, officers picketed BPD headquarters and demanded his resignation. Grievances with Pomerleau continued to mount. In a 1973 grand jury investigation on corruption within the BPD, Rapanotti accused him of spying and of applying polygraphs tests selectively only to lower-ranking officers. Banned from striking by its constitution, in March of this year the union began to consider job actions.

=== Collective bargaining ===
By 1973, about 2,000 of Baltimore's 3,500 police officers claimed membership in Local 1195. AFSCME leaders and representatives from other public employee unions and organizations pressed the City of Baltimore for collective bargaining rights and higher wages. Some of the officers had worked previously at Bethlehem Steel and been on strike before.

In November 1973, Pomerleau agreed to recognize collective representation for police, and held an election to choose an exclusive bargaining agent. He stipulated that whatever the result, no secondary boycotts, slow-downs, stoppages, or strikes would be allowed. Local 1195 won the election by a large margin, with 1,488 votes to 769 for FOP 3. Turnout was 85%. After Local 1195's victory, Rapanotti laid out a 26-point proposal for the city.

Local 1195 immediately attempted to make good on the promise that collective bargaining might improve conditions and wages for police officers. The police asked for an increase of their salary range from $8,761–$11,082 to $12,500–$14,500. The city offered 5.5% raise, with a 0.5% increase in benefits. This package had recently been accepted by other city workers, including teachers, who went on strike in February of the same year. (The salary raise was 5.5% or 20 cents an hour, whichever was greater for the workers at hand. For many other municipal employees, 20 cents an hour was greater.) On June 30, Local 1195 voted unanimously to reject the city's offer.

== Actions begin ==
The lead-up to the police strike was a period of radical labor activity and unrest, sparked by a walkout of the city's garbage collectors.

=== Municipal workers strike ===
On July 1, 1974, over 700 sanitation workers walked off their jobs in a wildcat strike (against the wishes of their union leadership in AFSCME Local 44). Workers cited low wages (they wanted a 50 cent raise instead of a 20 cent raise) and undignified conditions (heat, exhaust fumes, and poorly maintained trucks) as reasons for striking. Mayor Schaefer threatened to fire them all. Soon after the strike began, AFSCME announced its support and sent major leaders from its national offices. By July 7 approximately 2,500 municipal sanitation workers, corrections officers, and other personnel had gone on strike. The atmosphere created by this strike emboldened the police force to push harder for their own demands.

=== Police job actions ===
Baltimore's police officers sympathized with other city workers, increasing their readiness to strike. The municipal strike—with garbage pileups and rioting inmates—also created an atmosphere of crisis, in which the role of police would be especially conspicuous. On July 6, the union formed a steering committee, with 84 members, to plan job actions intended to pressure the city for negotiations. According to the findings disclosed by a 1977 court case, these actions had "tacit approval" from Commissioner Pomerleau, who also wanted the city to negotiate further.

On July 7, police began 'job actions' that signaled their discontent. Officers would write lengthy reports on pennies ("objects of value") found along the side of the road and would turn obvious samples of tobacco over to the police lab for drug analysis. There was a massive increase in traffic stops and a 1000% increase in tickets issued. One ticket led to an altercation resulting in three arrests. Mayor Schaefer's limousine was ticketed twice. Kenneth Webster, a state delegate, was arrested (on littering charges), for tearing up one of these tickets in front of the ticketing officer. John A. Lann, a police officer, was arrested and suspended from the BPD for blocking traffic on the newly constructed I-83. Union officials threatened a total strike if he was not released.

These actions mounted day by day and garnered widespread attention. On July 10, police cars blocked two out of three lanes on Franklin St. downtown.

=== Decision to strike ===
Pressure for a strike had been building since the new contract was announced on June 30. Rapanotti opposed a full strike, predicting (correctly): "This thing is only a week old. If you pull and strike at this moment, they're going over there and offer the garbagemen some money, and we're going to be standing there holding our Yo-Yo's." But after four days of job actions, the union's members were ready to escalate.

After meeting for an hour and a half on the afternoon of Thursday, July 11, members of the steering committee decided unanimously to go on strike.

== Police officers strike ==
At 8PM on July 11, 39 officers on the 4PM–12AM shift returned to their stations and turned in their equipment. They were joined by 33 members of the Tactical Section. Only 96 (of 238 scheduled) showed up for the midnight shift. Striking officers established picket lines at seven stations. The Baltimore Sun reported that looting began immediately in West and East Baltimore.

Strikers formed picket lines and carried signs reading "I will not die for 5.5" and "Professional Pay for Professional Service".

=== Striking and nonstriking officers ===
It is estimated that nearly 1,300 police officers of the 2,300 went on strike. Nonstriking officers worked overtime: 12 hours a day, 7 days a week. (According to Pomerleau, there were only 565 strikers; most sources said his estimate was too low.)

Newspapers reported tension between striking and non-striking officers. "Don't trust that guy," one striking officer said of a working officer to a national guard soldier. Some nonstriking officers likewise felt betrayed by their fellow workers and by Local 1195, which was officially a non-striking union.

Officers of the Fraternal Order of Police released statements opposing the strike.

Fourteen white youths picketed the strikers, displaying signs that said "Safety First; Money Second".

=== Effect on crime ===
After the walkout on Thursday, July 11, the BPD and the fire department received increased looting and arson reports. Trash fires (facilitated by the sanitation workers' strike) were the most common violation reported. These fires intensified immediately in southwest Baltimore, where all 22 officers on the night shift had walked off. Fire alarms increased to hundreds per day, and some fire fighters were harassed when they arrived on the scene. Neighborhoods already high in crime saw more of it.

Police reported that the city was particularly quiet on the night of Friday, July 12. This abrupt halt in reported crimes coincided with the visible arrival of outside forces.

One man, identified as a looter, was shot and killed by a nonstriking officer on July 12. Commissioner Pomerleau declared, "We're in a semi-riot mode, similar to the 1968 riots." However, activity in the streets never reached the same levels, and much less damage resulted.

== Government response ==
The strike met with opposition from the city government, the state government, and the judiciary. These authorities reacted more severely to the police strike than to the simultaneous municipal strike.

Before midnight on July 11, Circuit Judge James C. Murphy issued an injunction ordering the strike to end immediately. This injunction had no immediate mechanism for enforcement.

On July 12, Maryland governor Marvin Mandel ordered outside police help from 115 state troopers and ten canine units. They arrived with 100 cruisers and a tractor-trailer carrying two jeeps. These troops were outfitted with riot weapons but wore soft hats instead of helmets.

The Maryland National Guard was put on alert but Mandel said he did not expect them to become involved.

Also on July 12, Commissioner Pomerleau announced that 457 officers had been suspended.

On Saturday, July 13, Judge Murphy declared a fine for each day of striking—$25,000 for the union and $10,000 for Rapanotti. He also threatened Rapanotti with jail if the strike continued beyond 10AM on Monday July 15. (Murphy issued parallel threats to union leaders connected to the ongoing municipal workers' strike.)

On July 14, Pomerleau fired 82 officers and demoted 9 detectives and 18 police agents (officers with college degrees). All the officers fired were 'probationary', meaning that they had served on the force for under two years; Commissioner Pomerleau stated that these officers were not entitled to hearings for their jobs. He further announced that there would be "no general amnesty", and that all striking workers would be fired unless they resumed their jobs immediately.

== Negotiations ==
The police walkout quickly triggered negotiations for both police and the striking municipal workers. Union representatives and city officials met for five hours on July 12, the day after the night shift walkout. With leaders of both Locals under direct threats from Judge Murphy, marathon negotiations continued day and night, with few breaks. These negotiations were tightly controlled by outside representatives of AFSCME, who temporarily suspended Rapanotti for negotiating without accompaniment.

On Sunday, July 14, AFSCME negotiators responded to Commissioner Pomerleau (who had just fired 82 officers, threatened to fire more, and declared no amnesty) that amnesty would be a condition of settlement.

On Monday, July 15, the city announced its settlement with Local 44: a 25 cent-raise immediately, and an additional 45 cents in 1975. The arrangement with the police was less clear. According to Mandel and Pomerleau, union leaders had promised that the officers would return to work. Leaders of the police union then announced in a press conference that they had been "assured of fair play" and that "many would be reinstated"—but there was still no promise of amnesty. Rapanonotti announced that the decision would be taken for ratification to a committee of strikers. Police officers would receive no immediate increase in salary. An increase of the salary range to $10,000–$13,500 was planned for July 1975.

Striking officers ratified the agreement on the morning July 16. Many of the strikers felt defeated, and most had already returned to work. Many of those who had been fired came to the meeting to express anger and frustration about the negotiations. Before this group would vote had to be reassured that leaders would seek amnesty.

== Aftermath ==
Pomerleau announced that returning strikers would be treated harshly, writing in a July 18 letter : "I have asked the sergeants of this department to 'take charge.' If they wish to deprive a striker of an air-conditioned car or refuse to assign a striker to overtime duties that is their prerogative and, I will back them up." These returning workers were also banned from park and stadium patrols, and from assuming "officer in charge" status.

Pomerleau suspended and then fired George P. Hoyt, president of AFSCME Local 1195 and leader of the strike. Hoyt had been a member of the force for 17 years and was four days away from retirement when he was fired. Pomerleau subsequently fired dozens more officers, including all of Local 1195's remaining officials.

On July 25, Pomerleau issued a message, posted on bulletin boards and read for three days at roll call, which distinguished between strike leaders and followers. In this message, he specified the offenses that would in particular be punished:

As these are completed, please be assured that varying actions will be taken on an individual basis against 1) those officers from the Southwestern District and Tactical Section who deserted their posts at or about 2000 hours on Thursday, July 11, abandoning the citizens and endangering their brother officers, 2) those who instigated, planned, and implemented the walkout of Tactical and Southwest, 3) those who conspired to diminish the department's ability to respond by:

a. jamming communications

b. mixing keys in the Motor Pool

c. blocking departmental [buses] so reinforcements could not move expeditiously, and

d. holding open mikes

4) those who exhorted and even coerced other officers to strike, 5) and those who spat upon their brother officers. These men will be dealt with.

Thomas Bradley, president of the Metropolitan Baltimore Labor Council (a regional arm of the AFL–CIO), promised to establish a committee "who will see to it that there are no reprisals". AFSCME president Jerry Wurf also promised to help the officers get their jobs back. These campaigns were ultimately unsuccessful.

Judge Murphy fined AFSCME $15,000 and union organizer Thomas Rapanotti $10,000. None of the striking officers or leaders were imprisoned.

=== Impact on the union ===
On July 17, Commissioner Pomerleau revoked the union's right to bargain, citing the terms of his 1973 order. He also announced that union dues would no longer be 'checked off' automatically from workers' paychecks and that union leaders would not be allowed to visit police headquarters unescorted.

The union of police supervisors (Local 1599), withdrew their membership in AFSCME.

Local 1195, along with AFSCME, filed a lawsuit against Pomerleau and Mandel for union busting and illegal spying. The suit also accused Captain Donald E. Einolf and Edward Crowder as agents of an anti-union conspiracy. This lawsuit was lost in 1977.

The city refused to allow police collective bargaining (let alone right to strike) until 1982.

=== Resentment ===
With no reprieve from the city, the formerly striking officers turned to Governor Mandel, asking him to re-authorize their union and impose amnesty. Mandel, feuding with AFSCME president Wurf, refused to assist them, declaring that he would prefer to lose the union's support in his re-election campaign.

Some officers felt sold out, or used as "cannon fodder," by the union leaders. Twenty of the officers who were fired sued national and local AFSCME offices in 1977 for false representation and negligence, charging that they should not have authorized an illegal strike that could lead them to lose their jobs.

Tension persisted between strikers and non-strikers. Some of the officers who did not strike opposed amnesty for those who did.
