= List of incidents of civil unrest in Baltimore =

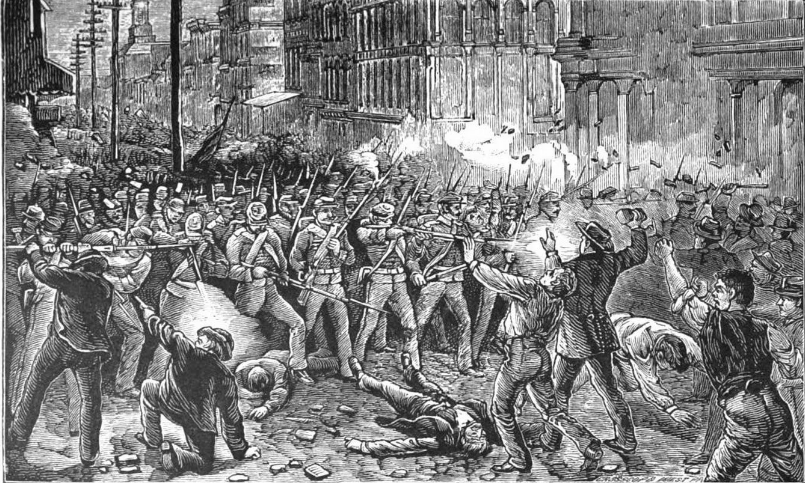
The 6th Regiment of the Maryland National Guard firing on the crowd during the strikes and riots of 1877

This list is about incidents of civil unrest, rioting, violent labor disputes, or minor insurrections or revolts in Baltimore, Maryland.

- 1812 1812 Baltimore riots, occurred in the months of June and July 1812 in response to a series of anti-war articles
- 1835 - Baltimore bank riot, occurred August 6 through 9 following the failure of the Bank of Maryland
- 1856 - Know-Nothing Riot of 1856, occurred in the fall of that year following the October municipal election
- 1861 - Baltimore Riot of 1861, occurred on April 19 between antiwar Democrats, Confederate sympathizers, and members of the Massachusetts militia
- 1877 - Baltimore railroad strike, occurred from June 16 to 29 as part of the Great Railroad Strike of 1877
- 1919 - Baltimore riots of 1919, series of riots connected to the Red Summer
- 1968 - Baltimore riot of 1968, occurred from April 6 to 14 following the assassination of Martin Luther King Jr.
- 1974 - Baltimore municipal strike of 1974, occurred June 30 through July 14 and began when waste collector sought higher wages and better working conditions
- 2015 - 2015 Baltimore protests, occurred April 12 following the death of Freddie Gray while in police custody

== See also ==
- List of incidents of civil unrest in the United States
- Lists of Incidents of unrest and violence in the United States by city
- List of riots (notable incidents of civil disorder worldwide)
