= 73rd Field Artillery Regiment =

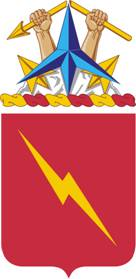
- Coat of arms
- Active: 1918
- Country: United States
- Branch: Army
- Type: Field artillery
- Motto(s): Speed and power always
- Colors: Blue, red, gold, and yellow.

Insignia
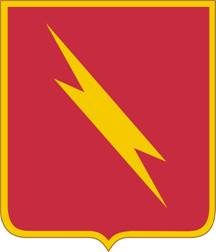
- Distinctive unit insignia

The 73rd Field Artillery Regiment is a field artillery regiment of the United States Army.

== History ==
=== World War I ===
The 73rd Field Artillery Regiment was originally organized in October 1918 in the Regular Army at Camp Jackson, South Carolina, as an element of the 22nd Field Artillery Brigade, the latter organized the previous month at Camp George G. Meade, Maryland. However, the brigade headquarters was demobilized at Camp Meade during October, followed by the 73rd Field Artillery on 28 December at Camp Jackson.

=== Interwar period ===
The 73rd Field Artillery was reconstituted in the Regular Army on 1 October 1933, assigned to the 23rd Field Artillery Brigade (General Headquarters Reserve), and allotted to the Second Corps Area. It was organized in 1934 with Organized Reserve personnel as a "Regular Army Inactive" (RAI) unit with headquarters at Newark, New Jersey. It was inactivated by March 1937 at Newark by relief of Reserve personnel. It was redesignated the 73rd Field Artillery Battalion on 13 January 1941.

=== World War II ===
On 15 March 1942, the battalion was ordered into active service at Fort Riley, Kansas, and organized as a separate truck-drawn 105 mm howitzer battalion. It was assigned to the 9th Armored Division on 15 July 1942, being converted into an armored field artillery battalion. The battalion departed the New York Port of Embarkation on 20 August 1944 and returned to the United States on 9 October 1945 via the Hampton Roads Port of Embarkation, Virginia, being inactivated there the same day.

=== Cold War ===
Parts of the regiment were based in West Germany between 1963 and 1975. The 4th Battalion, 73rd Artillery was deployed to help suppress the April 1968 Baltimore riots.

== Distinctive unit insignia ==
- Description: A gold color metal and enamel device 1 1/8 inches (2.9 cm) in height overall consisting of a shield blazoned: Gules, a lightning flash in bend Or.
- Symbolism: The scarlet background represents the Field Artillery, while the gold lightning bolt symbolizes the speed and power of the Armored Artillery.
- Background: The distinctive unit insignia was originally approved for the 73rd Armored Field Artillery Battalion on 17 March 1943and re-designated for the 73rd Artillery Regiment on 5 December 1957 It was amended to include the description on 4 September 1959. The insignia was re-designated effective 1 September 1971, for the 73rd Field Artillery Regiment

== Coat of arms ==
=== Blazon ===
- Shield

Gules, a lightning flash in bend Or.

- Crest

On a wreath Or and Gules, issuing from a snowbank Proper behind a caltrop Azure, the Dexter and sinister points each surmounting in base a caltrop counter bend-wise of the first, two cubit arms grasping the halves of a spear broken chevron-wise of the first. Motto SPEED AND POWER ALWAYS.

- Symbolism
- Shield

The scarlet is for the Field Artillery, the gold lightning bolt is symbolic of the speed and power of the Armored Artillery. Crest The design of the crest alludes primarily to the 73rd Artillery's participation in the 1944 winter counter offensive against Germany and is symbolized by the caltrops (a heraldic military device used to impede and delay the movements of the enemy). The two smaller caltrops allude to St. Vith and Echternock, and the larger to Bastogne, the later is blue in reference to the Distinguished Unit Citation awarded the battalion for its role in the defense of Bastogne. The snow refers to the severe winter weather during the period the battalion made its stand against the German counter offensive and is symbolized by two arms breaking a spear. Had it not been for this delaying action the Germans would have taken Bastogne before the 101st Airborne Division arrived.

- Background

The coat of arms was originally approved for the 73rd Armored Field Artillery Battalion on 17 March 1943. It was re-designated for the 73rd Artillery Regiment on 5 December 1957. It was amended to include the description of the shield on 4 September 1959. It was amended to include a crest and motto on 8 January 1965. The insignia was re-designated effective 1 September 1971, for the 73rd Field Artillery Regiment.

== Current configuration ==
- 1st Battalion 73rd Field Artillery Regiment (United States)
- 2nd Battalion 73rd Field Artillery Regiment (United States)
- 3rd Battalion 73rd Field Artillery Regiment (United States)
- 4th Battalion 73rd Field Artillery Regiment (United States)
- 5th Battalion 73rd Field Artillery Regiment (United States)
- 6th Battalion 73rd Field Artillery Regiment (United States)

== See also ==
- Field Artillery Branch (United States)
