= A History of Money and Banking in the United States =

Book by economist Murray Rothbard

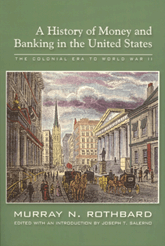
- Author: Murray Rothbard
- Language: English
- Subject: Politics; Economics; Gold Standard; Federal Reserve
- Publisher: Ludwig Von Mises Institute
- Publication date: August 30, 2002
- Publication place: United States
- Media type: Hardcover
- Pages: 510
- ISBN: 978-0-945466-33-8
- OCLC: 51205107

A History of Money and Banking in the United States is a 2002 book by economist Murray Rothbard, released posthumously based on his archived manuscripts. The author traces inflations, banking panics, and money meltdowns from the Colonial Period through the mid-20th century.
