= 1974 Baltimore municipal strike =

Strikes and protests by public workers

Baltimore municipal strike of 1974
- Date: June 30, 1974 – July 14, 1974
- Location: Baltimore, Maryland, United States
- Goals: wages
- Methods: Strikes, Protest, Demonstrations

Parties
| AFSCME | City of Baltimore |

Lead figures
| Jerome Wurf | William Donald Schaefer |

Number
| 1,350 protesters | 100+ Baltimore police supervisors |

Casualties and losses
| Deaths: Injuries: Arrests: 5+ | Deaths: Injuries: |

The 1974 Baltimore municipal strike was a strike action undertaken by different groups of municipal workers in Baltimore, Maryland, United States. It was initiated by waste collectors seeking higher wages and better conditions. They were joined by sewer workers, zookeepers, prison guards, highway workers, recreation & parks workers, animal control workers, abandoned vehicles workers, and eventually by police officers. Trash piled up during the strike, and, especially with diminished police enforcement, many trash piles were set on fire. City jails were also a major site for unrest.

The Baltimore strike was prominent within a wave of public sector strikes across the United States. All of the striking workers were members of American Federation of State, County and Municipal Employees (AFSCME), a relatively radical and expanding national union. AFSCME President Jerry Wurf attained national notoriety for allegedly urging workers to "let Baltimore burn" if their demands were not met.

== Background ==
In the 1960s, a combination of civil rights struggles, white flight, and the loss of manufacturing jobs led Baltimore's African American population to gain an increasing share of the city's public sector jobs. However, many of these jobs did not pay a living wage, and the workers were not allowed to unionize until after the turbulent events of spring 1968 (see Memphis sanitation strike and Baltimore riot of 1968).

The city itself, losing many tax-paying residents to the suburbs, was already suffering from budget shortfalls and beginning to shift toward privatization of services. The 1971 election of Mayor William Donald Schaefer consolidated this trend and signaled the erosion of what small gains in black control had already been won.

The 1960s and early 1970s saw radicalization among public sector workers across the United States. In many cities, following a pattern similar to Baltimore's, these workers became politicized and began to demand collective bargaining rights. Many joined AFSCME, under the new leadership of Jerome Wurf.

Blue-collar city employees were paid about $3.00 an hour, with the prospect of a 20 cent raise in the 1975 budget. Workers also complained about a strict policy on absences, according to which a worker could be fired after missing eight days. 1974 had already seen a strike from sanitation workers in nearby Baltimore County. And a February teachers' strike had made striking seem like a real possibility. Tension rose when the city offered a new contract in June 1974.

== A snowballing strike ==
On Sunday, June 30, 700 workers voted to accept the city's planned raise at a union meeting. On Monday, July 1, 1974, about 1000 sanitation workers, unsatisfied with the contract, walked off their jobs. The strikers demanded raises of 50 cents instead of 20 cents (from $3.00 an hour to $3.50 an hour), and a new policy on absences. They were soon joined by some sewer workers and by 200 highway workers. On July 3, highway workers voted unanimously to join the strike, bringing their contribution to 600 and the total number of striking workers to nearly 2,500.

On July 9 the strikers were joined by 350 guards from the Baltimore City Jail, who walked off their jobs at 7AM, leaving control to 25 high-ranking officers. At this point the strikers numbered 3,000.

=== Strike activities ===
Striking workers set up picket lines at city dumps and sewer yards. As more workers joined the strike picket lines were established at other workplaces, including the city jail and the zoo. Not all work during the strike was completely stopped. Striking zookeepers continued to feed their animals, even as they refused to clean up the resulting fecal matter. Slogans included "No cash, no trash". Strikers held signs reading "I Am Somebody" and "I Am a Man," reminiscent of the 1968 Memphis sanitation strike. At the War Memorial Plaza demonstration, the crowd chanted "They say landfill, we say no: City Hall's where garbage goes."

=== Police strike ===
Baltimore police also disputed the new contract, and, encouraged by the other striking workers, they began "job actions" on July 7. These included the writing of detailed reports of miscellaneous objects on the street, as well as an unusually high number of traffic stops.

On July 11, Police Local 1195 (also affiliated with AFSCME) voted to strike, and most officers on the night shift walked off. The walkout added urgency to the strike and the magnified national attention directed towards it.

=== Prison disturbances ===
After the prison guards went on strike, inmates were left with little supervision. They were confined to their cells for long stretches of time and all criminal trials were postponed. A council of 16 inmates argued that their right to due process was being violated. They accused the striking guards of wishing to provoke mayhem (to demonstrate the chaos that would occur in their absence). Finally, the council asked for certain supervisors to be kept away from prisoners, and demanded self-governance for inmates.

On July 13, three or four replacement supervisors were taken hostage in a roomful of juvenile inmates demanding their freedom. Nonstriking policeman intervened with dogs and nightsticks, apparently rejecting an offer of assistance from the striking guards. Police said that adult inmates helped end the uprising. Two guards and two inmates were injured. (When the guards ended their strike, they were met with another prison uprising, which was suppressed with tear gas and riot gear.)

=== Other incidents ===
Nine sanitation workers were arrested and charged with disorderly conduct on July 7 when they stood in the way of a bulldozer sent to move trash.

On July 10, 60 supporters of the strike held a demonstration in War Memorial Plaza outside of city hall. After several people had spoken to the group, demonstrators began to disperse trash from bags they had brought. They soon met with twelve club-wielding police officers. Eleven demonstrators and The Baltimore Sun photographer Irving H. Phillips, Jr., were arrested on littering charges.

Sixteen jail guards and a union organizer were arrested (also on July 10) for preventing supervisors from entering the jail.

There were increased reports of fires during the strike, especially during the last few days when the police were also on strike. Before the police strike, reports of trash fires were somewhat localized to Cherry Hill. Arson was the major reported crime throughout, with a wave of looting directly after the police walkout. These troops were outfitted with riot weapons but wore soft hats instead of helmets.

== Government response ==
=== Mayor Schaefer ===
Mayor Schaefer immediately threatened to fire all of the striking workers and hire new others, saying "there's just no more money. No way." He promised to break the strike quickly and announced the opening of dumps to the public.

After about a week, Schaefer mobilized 350 of the city's white-collar workers as strikebreakers to pick up trash. These workers ("Schaefer's Raiders" ) were paid time-and-half for overtime, based on their typically higher salaries. They used small dumping areas that were changed daily so as to avoid the strikers.

=== Circuit Court ===
Judicial proceedings surrounding the strike took place mostly in the Mitchell Courthouse downtown. The Court dealt with three AFSCME leaders: Ray Clarke, president of Local 44; Ernest Crofoot, director of the regional Council 67; and P.J. Ciampa, a field director from the (inter)national union who had organized (and been maced) during the 1968 Memphis sanitation strike.

On the night of Tuesday, July 2, Circuit Judge James W. Murphy declared the strike illegal and issued an injunction against the garbage collectors. On Saturday July 6, Murphy fined Local 44 $15,000 for every day the strike continued after Monday July 8. On Tuesday the 9th he issued another injunction against other departments newly on strike.

On July 10, Judge Murphy announced that he was prepared to enforce the $15,000 immediately and each following afternoon. Murphy was then informed that Local 44 had only $6000, which he then confiscated.

On Friday, July 12, Murphy froze the union's assets (around $5000) and threatened to increase the fines against the union and its leaders unless the workers returned to their jobs. He also threatened to jail the three union leaders if the strike did not end, giving Monday, July 15 as the deadline.

== Union involvement ==
The municipal strike started out as a wildcat action, in protest of a contract that the union had just accepted. However, unions soon claimed credit and responsibility, and it was ultimately union negotiators who ended the strike.

=== AFSCME ===
AFSCME Local 44 initially asked the strikers to return to work. By the morning of Tuesday, July 2, AFSCME leadership on all levels had endorsed the strike.

Many workers were upset that the union had backed the city's contract, and hung an effigy of Local 44's president, Raymond H. Clark.

On July 5, President Wurf, Secretary-Treasurer Bill Lucy, and two other officials from the union were arrested for blocking cars from entering landfills.

Clark and union area director Ernest Crofoot both subsequently suggested to the city and to the media that the strike might turn violent, and that the union would be unable to control this violence.

Police involvement increased the stakes for AFSCME, which had the potential to unionize police locals around the country.

=== AFL–CIO ===
AFSCME is part of the AFL–CIO, which has its own regional representatives in Baltimore. The regional AFL–CIO established a welfare fund to help striking workers who missed paychecks.

=== CMEA ===
The Classified Municipal Employees Association (CMEA), a union for white-collar city workers in Baltimore, did not back the strike; indeed, its members had been paid overtime to act as strikebreakers. CMEA leadership downplayed their union's responsibility, stating that individuals had made their own decisions to pick up trash during the strike.

== Resolution ==
Negotiations were fruitless for most of the strike. The police walkout quickly spurred long negotiations, with both locals, at the Lord Baltimore Hotel. These negotiations were tightly controlled by AFSCME leadership from outside Baltimore. According to The Baltimore Sun reporter Tom Horton, they were also confusing, frustrating, and substantially fueled by alcohol.

By July 14, negotiators had apparently come slightly closer, with the city offering 25 cents instead of 20 and the union asking for 40 cents instead of 50. Some expressed fears that the police union would capitulate too quickly to the city's demands. In fact, Local 44 came to an agreement first, on July 15. The total negotiating time had been 43 hours. The city agreed to an incremental raise of 70 cents per hour over the next two years, starting with an immediate raise of 25 cents per hour. The city also agreed to negotiate a new system for reckoning absences. According to these terms, annual salary for a starting full-time waste collector would be about $7,800. The city also promised full medical coverage and no reprisals for the strikers. Some of the strikers returned to work late on that day.

None of the union leaders were jailed. The charges against Wurf and Lucy were dropped in November.

== Aftermath ==
Judge Murphy fined the union $90,000, to be paid out of workers' checks (a cost of approximately $9 per worker). Mayor Schaefer promised that "taxpayers are not going to pay for one red cent for this year's settlement," suggesting that 300 public sector workers would be laid off to accommodate the raise.

60–70 prison guards walked off their jobs on July 18 in reaction to the suspension of 23 guards for striking. The suspension decision was reversed that night.

Members of the CMEA rejected a merger with AFSCME in August, expressing dissatisfaction with the strike.

Governor Marvin Mandel, in the midst of a campaign for re-election, took some flak from labor leaders for his role in the strike (backing Schaefer and Pomerleau).

The Baltimore police force was understaffed for at least the rest of the year and reported substantial increases in crime.

AFSCME was the major negotiator for municipal workers when their contracts were renegotiated in 1976. It negotiated a 4% raise for municipal workers; the city also agreed to impose mandatory fees for non-union workers who benefited from the negotiations. This bargain was not popular with the workers themselves, many of whom shouted and screamed at president Ray Clarke after his announcement.

== See also ==
- List of incidents of civil unrest in Baltimore
