= Donald Pomerleau =

American police chief and United States Marine (1915–1992)

Donald D. Pomerleau (August 31, 1915 – January 19, 1992) was the commissioner of the Baltimore Police Department from 1966 to 1981.

== Background ==
Pomerleau was born on a ranch near Medicine Lake, Montana, with an unusual western, rural upbringing for a future big-city police supervisor.

After graduating from high school in Whitehall, Montana in 1933, Pomerleau joined the Marines and served in China from 1934 to 1937. He was discharged honorably from the Marines as a sergeant in 1938. After his discharge, Pomerleau worked for a construction company in Nevada, and then for the U. S. Border Patrol in California and Arizona. In 1942, after World War II began, he re-enlisted and served in the Military Police Corps of the United States Army. Pomerleau served in the Guadalcanal Campaign, the Battle of Tarawa, the Battle of Saipan, and Battle of Tinian. Pomerleau was discharged in 1945.

During the Korean War, Pomerleau served as a combat commander. He served as provost marshal at the Marine Corps School and University, retiring in 1958 with the rank of lieutenant colonel.

Pomerleau became the Director of Public Safety in Kingsport, Tennessee. He assumed a similar position later in 1962 in the City of Miami-Dade County. But he was not well-respected or liked by the Miami-Dade County police force, and generally could not get his way or institute his programs and policies.

By 1964, he became a consultant for the Baltimore City Police Department sent by the International Association of Chiefs of Police (IACP). The IACP then also sent Pomerleau in 1965 to investigate Baltimore during the heat of the earlier years of the civil rights movement, with rising fears of civil unrest in the wake of the Watts Riots in Los Angeles that year. Pomerleau declared that "the Baltimore City Police Department was amongst the nation's most antiquated and corrupt police forces which had practiced excessive force and had a non-existent relationship with Baltimore's large Negro (then Black, later African American) community". To improve the Department and try to prevent future racial rioting, Maryland's 54th Governor, J. Millard Tawes, (1894-1979), [served 1959-1967], an Eastern Shore Democrat, whose Office had for a century, since before the American Civil War, held the power to appoint Baltimore City's Commissioner of Police. In consultation with Baltimore's then progressive Republican Mayor (and former 1950s Governor himself), Theodore R. McKeldin, (1900-1974), [38th and 42nd Mayor, served 1943–1947, 1963-1967], he hired Pomerleau the following year of 1966 with a mandate and charge to "clean up" the Department. Although it seemed that the new Commissioner came with a relatively liberal attitude toward race relations, urban poverty, and crime and many observers feel that he gradually turned more conservative and even autocratic as his tenure wore on, so that by the time of the Republican presidency of Richard M. Nixon in the 1970s, Pomerleau's attitudes and policies had come to resemble those of Nixon's "silent majority" rather than those that Governor Tawes and Mayor McKeldin expected.

The new police commissioner moved to the city and lived in the southern lower neighborhood of Roland Park in North Baltimore.

== Impact on the police force ==
Soon after his appointment, Pomerleau made it easier for people to join the force, decreasing vacancies from 418 to 370 within six months. His first budget proposal included higher salaries and bigger pensions for patrolmen/officers, new vehicles (with a re-designed "friendlier" blue and white paint scheme, to replace the long-time traditional "black and whites"), setting up of an analysis center, additional money for recruitment, and a school for continuous training of officers, following up on the police academy. He quickly equipped police with mace, helmets, walkie-talkies, and more vehicles with radio-contact communications and body radios for officers, phasing out the old green "call boxes" on a post, dotting city streets, after securing a $48 million budget from the City — an increase of $15 million over a three-year span.

=== Operations ===
Pomerleau was a believer in a military hierarchy and created a strict chain of command. He also introduced new riot control tactics: for example, distinguishing 'offensive' weapons ('chemical agents such as tear gas') from defensive weapons (nightstick, revolver).

=== African Americans ===
Pomerleau immediately recognized racial tension as a major challenge for the BCPD. Soon after his appointment, he asked officers to take crash courses in Black (now African-American) history.

Pomerleau also lifted remaining job restrictions on African American officers from when the Department first tentatively recruited a limited number of "Colored" patrolmen in the 1930s, who were previously limited to foot patrols, quarantined in rank, barred from patrolling in "White" neighborhoods, and given limited specialty assignments. However, the percentage number of blacks on the force, and particularly the number of black promotions, remained low, during Pomerleau's tenure and only began to rise dramatically by the 1980s.

== Spying ==
=== Inspectional Services Division ===
Immediately after his appointment, Pomerleau created the "Inspectional Services Division" (ISD), an agency responsible for "active surveillance of individuals or groups outside the normal criminal behavior". Over the next 10 years, the ISD spied on nationwide plus local affiliates of organizations like the American Civil Liberties Union, the American Friends Service Committee, and the Black Panther Party.

=== Outside reports ===
Year after year from 1971 to 1978, Representative Parren Mitchell (from the 7th Congressional District) called for Pomerleau's resignation because of alleged spying (and even possible harassment) on black-oriented organizations and associations especially those involved in the growing anti-Vietnam War movement of the late 1960s and early 1970s.

He was also accused of spying on and harassing members of Police Local 1195 for the purpose of union-busting.

In 1976, The Maryland Senate issued a report stating that Pomerleau had used illegal spying methods, including wiretapping, surveillance, and illicit acquisition of credit reports. Pomerleau said he had done nothing illegal and that any spying was a necessary countermeasure against 'subversive elements' in the Department.

Journalists reported that Pomerleau had intimidated them using information from his spy network. Michael Olesker of The Baltimore Sun described meeting Pomerleau in the mid-1970s: "'Listen,' he said, 'I know where you've been, I know who you've talked to, and I know what you've been told.'" And he did."

== Praise and criticism ==
Pomerleau received constant support and praise from Mayor William Donald Schaefer and Governor Marvin Mandel.

In 1976, Pomerleau was the Advertising Club of Baltimore's "Man of the Year".

== Post-police commissioner career ==
Pomerleau was one of the longest serving police commissioners of Baltimore holding that post for a period of 15 years, the longest tenure since Charles Gaither who held the first posting of the newly created Office of Commissioner of Police at the last major re-organization and structuring of the BCPD from 1920–1937.

=== Baltimore's Best Security ===
Pomerleau retired from the Baltimore City Police Department in September 1981.

In October 1981, Commissioner Pomerleau was hired by the Abacus Corporation, a nationwide private security and guard force agency which then received an expanded contract with the city and established "Abacus Security Services".

The following month of November, Pomerleau created a private firm called "Baltimore's Best Security". This firm was to create special quasi-private police force for maintaining security of public buildings. Members of this force would have more authority than those of ordinary private firms; however, they would not be subject to city personnel regulations. The creation of the company—and its immediate endorsement and announcement of a no-bid contract by Mayor Schaefer—provoked an outcry from Baltimoreans, who called it expensive and unaccountable and feared that it would be favored over some of the city's preexisting black-owned firms.

The City Council, in late 1981, led by President Walter Orlinsky, accused Pomerleau and Schaefer of attempting to establish a "shadow government". The Council attempted to pass rules that would restrict the role of quasi-private agencies in city governance. This was the beginning of a 30-year controversy involving the use of a massive "slush fund" treasury, issuance of city-backed bonds for various "civic improvement" and commercial/residential "urban renewal" by a newly created public-private agency, the Baltimore Development Corporation and its powerful Trustees, which continued the major re-development of the "Inner Harbor" area where previous city agencies from the 1950s to 1970s left off, and soon expanded its reach and influence among its projects throughout the city. The controversies endured through six more mayoral administrations up to 2013, upon the retirement of long-time BDC head, M. Jay Brodie. It even became a matter for local humor as one time at an event, Mayor William Donald Schaefer, showed up with a long black cape draped and curled around his body and arm, topped by a black slouch fedora hat of the 1940s detective-style novels and cartoons or the old prime-time radio drama "The Shadow" with character "Lamont Cranston". Newspaper photographs flew around the Nation! "Baltimore's Best Security" was not heard from again; however, Abacus continued to receive no-bid city contracts.

Pomerleau died of cancer at his new retirement home in Edwardsville, Virginia.

== See also ==
Police appointments
Preceded by Bernard Schmidt	Commissioner of the Baltimore Police Department; 1966-1981	Succeeded by Frank Battaglia
