= Baltimore railroad strike of 1877 =

Strikes and riots in Baltimore in 1877

- Part of the Great Railroad Strike of 1877
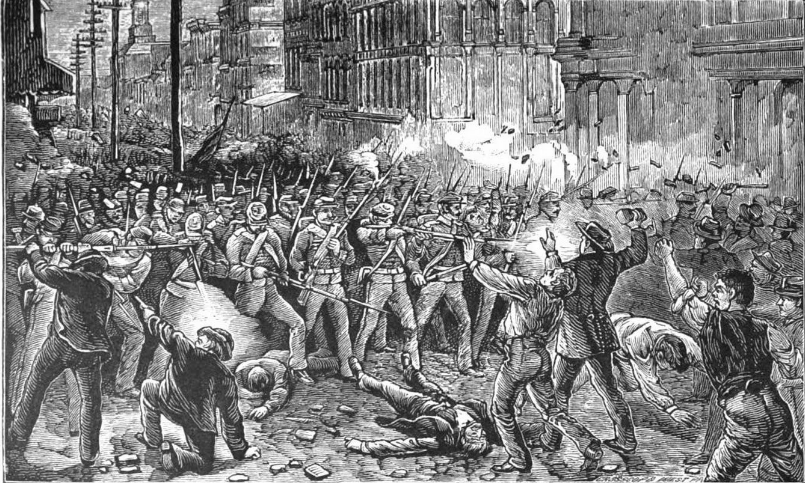
- Sixth Maryland Regiment firing on the rioters in Baltimore - 1877
- Date: July 16–29, 1877
- Location: Baltimore, Maryland; 39.28346°N 76.619554°W
- Result: Minor concessions

Casualties
- Deaths: 10–22 (Note: Between 1 and 10 men of the 6th Regiment killed on July 20, between 9 and twelve civilians killed on July 20)
- Injuries: 51–86+ (Note: Two severely wounded on July 17; more than 20 seriously wounded, and several dozen minor injuries suffered by the 6th Regiment on July 20; between 16 and 24 casualties suffered by the 5th Regiment on July 20; between 13 and 40 civilian injuries on July 20; unknown number beaten by police during arrests on July 21)
- Arrested: 165–212 (Note: Between 165 and 200 arrested at Camden Station on July 21, 16 arrested on July 21 at confrontation at Lee and Eutaw streets as reported by the newspaper The Sun, which may or may not be counted in the above, and a total of 212 charges of riot and drunkenness disposed of by the southern district court on July 22, also reported by The Sun)

The Baltimore railroad strike of 1877 involved several days of work stoppage and violence in Baltimore, Maryland, in 1877. It formed a part of the Great Railroad Strike of 1877, during which widespread civil unrest spread nationwide following the global depression and economic downturns of the mid-1870s. Strikes broke out along the Baltimore and Ohio Railroad (B&O) on July 16, the same day that 10% wage reductions were scheduled.

Violence erupted in Baltimore on July 20, with police and soldiers of the Maryland National Guard clashing with crowds of thousands gathered throughout the city. In response, President Rutherford B. Hayes ordered federal troops to Baltimore, local officials recruited 500 additional police, and two new national guard regiments were formed. Peace was restored on July 22. Between 10 and 22 were killed, more than 150 were injured, and many more were arrested.

Negotiations between strikers and the B&O were unsuccessful, and most strikers quit rather than return to work at the newly reduced wages. The company easily found enough workers to replace the strikers, and under the protection of the military and police, traffic resumed on July 29. The company promised minor concessions at the time, and eventually enacted select reforms later that year.

== The Long Depression and the Great Strikes ==
Growth rates of industrial production (1850s–1913)
	1850s–1873	1873–1890	1890–1913
Germany	4.3	2.9	4.1
United Kingdom	3.0	1.7	2.0
United States	6.2	4.7	5.3
France	1.7	1.3	2.5
Italy		0.9	3.0
Sweden		3.1	3.5

The Long Depression, sparked in the United States by the Panic of 1873, had extensive implications for US industry, closing more than a hundred railroads in the first year and cutting construction of new rail lines from 7,500 miles (12,100 km) of track in 1872 to 1,600 miles (2,600 km) in 1875. Approximately 18,000 businesses failed between 1873 and 1875, production in iron and steel dropped as much as 45 percent, and a million or more lost their jobs. In 1876, 76 railroad companies went bankrupt or entered receivership in the US alone, and the economic impacts rippled throughout many economic sectors throughout the industrialized world.

In mid-1877, tensions erupted in stoppages and civil unrest across the nation in what would become known as the Great Railroad Strike or the Great Strikes. Violence began in Martinsburg, West Virginia and spread along the rail lines through Baltimore and on to several major cities and transportation hubs of the time, including Reading, Scranton and Shamokin, Pennsylvania; a bloodless general strike in St. Louis, Missouri; and a short lived uprising in Chicago, Illinois. In the worst case, rioting in Pittsburgh, Pennsylvania left 61 dead and 124 injured. Much of the city's center was burned, including more than a thousand rail cars destroyed. What began as the peaceful actions of organized labor attracted the masses of discontented and unemployed workers spawned by the depression, along with others who took opportunistic advantage of the chaos. In total, an estimated 100,000 workers participated nationwide. State and federal troops followed the turmoil as it spread along the rail lines from city to city, beginning in Baltimore, where the movement of troops itself provoked a violent response that ultimately required federal intervention to quell.

== Early events ==
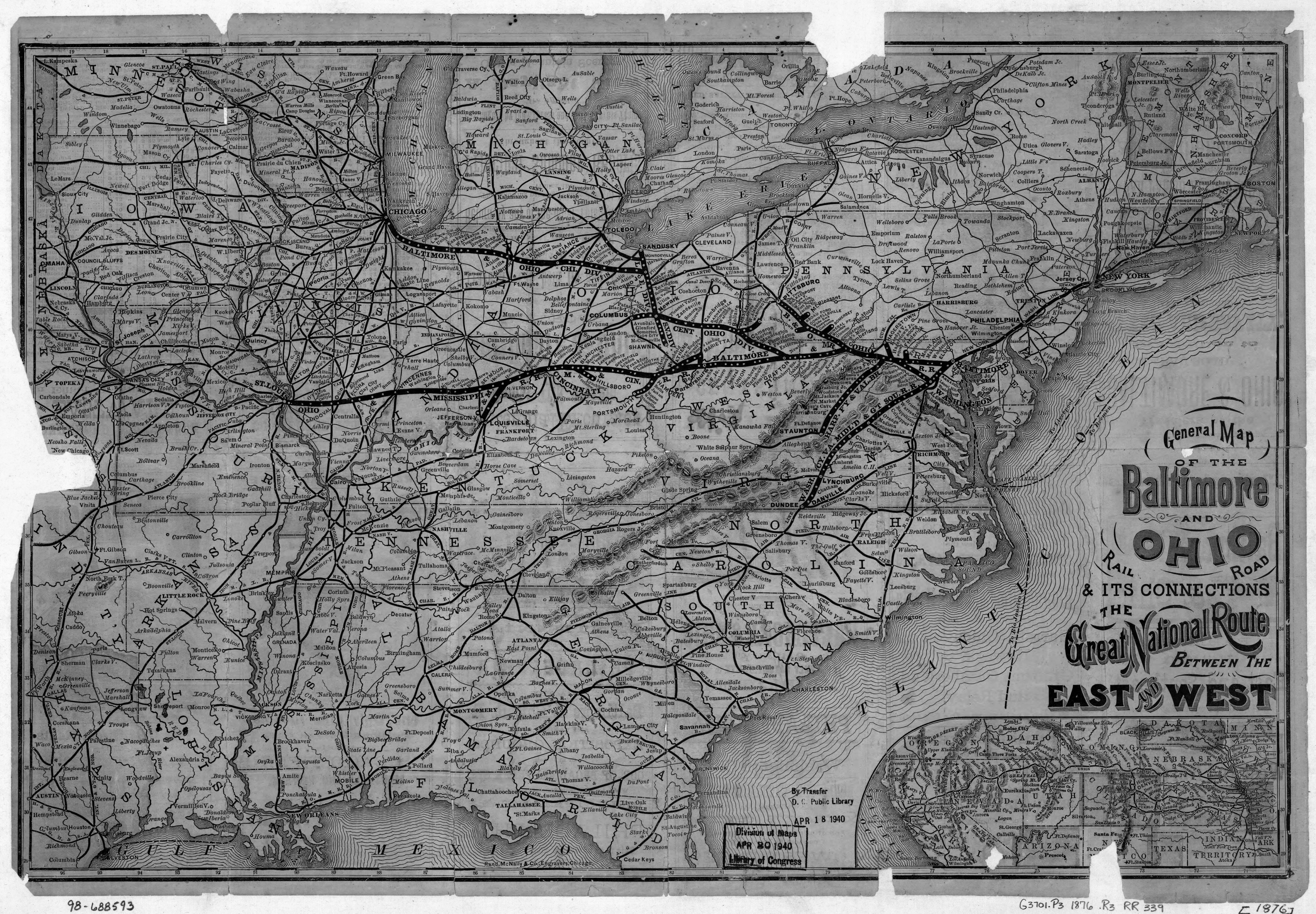
Map of the B&O rail lines as of 1876

In early July 1877, the Baltimore and Ohio Railroad (B&O) announced it would reduce the wages of all workers by ten percent. One hundred miles would constitute a day's work, and crews would not receive allowances for time spent on delays at stations. Various meetings of railroad employees followed, and a committee was formed to meet with officers of the railroad. They appealed to the vice president, Mr. King, but he declined to meet.

Most workers accepted the reduction in pay, but the firemen and those who ran the freight trains resolved to stop work in protest. The number of unemployed along the line was so great, owing to the ongoing economic problems, that the company had no difficulty replacing the absent strikers. In response, the strikers resolved to occupy portions of the rail line, and to stop trains from passing unless the company rescinded the wage cuts.

== July 16–19 ==
On July 16, the day the reduction was to go into effect, about 40 men gathered at Camden Junction, 3 miles (4.8 km) from Baltimore, and stopped traffic. Newspapers reported a meeting held by rail workers who were sympathetic to the strike, which by that day included brakemen and engineers as well as firemen.

That same day in Baltimore, hundreds of manufacturing workers declared a strike, and the box-makers and sawyers walked out, demanding a ten percent increase in wages. Newspaper reports counted 140 of the union's 180 members who went on strike. Tin can makers in the city had already been striking for higher wages for a week at this point, and their number amounted to 800, while not more than 100 can makers in the city remained at work according to reports by The Sun.

At around 2:00 am on July 17, the first act of violence in Baltimore emerged. According to the newspaper reports the following day, a westbound train was thrown from the tracks at a switch in a suburb south of the city. The switch had been opened and locked by an unknown person. The engine caught fire, and the engineer and the fireman aboard were severely injured.

That afternoon violence broke out in Martinsburg, West Virginia, between workers and militia guarding a train, prompting the governor of West Virginia to appeal to the President for aid. (Note: On July 18, 1877, The Sun reported the events as follows: "As the train reached the switch one of the strikers, William Vandergriff, seized the switch-ball to run the train on the side track. John Poisal, a member of the militia ... jumped from the pilot of the engine and attempted to replace the switch so that the train could go on. Vandergriff fired two shots at Poisal, one causing a slight flesh wound in the side of the head. Poisal returned fire, shooting Vandergriff through the hip. Several other shots were fired at Vandergriff, striking him in the hand and arm. ... The volunteering engineer and firemen of the train ran off as soon as the shooting began." Vandergriff's arm would be amputated later that day according to reports in The Sun.) Strikers occupied stations at Cumberland, Maryland; Grafton, West Virginia; Keyser, West Virginia, and elsewhere, and halted the movement of freight. Newspaper reports counted 400–500 men who had joined the rail strike, and in Martinsburg, 75 trains with 1,200 rail cars sat idle.

That day, The Sun reported the situation in the city:

One by one the shops have become wholly or partly silent, and very many men, especially in South Baltimore, are without work or the means of providing for their families. This state of affairs is confined not alone to railroad shops, but to other workshops, and a great deal of distress exists among the workingmen of all kinds.

On July 18, the railroad strikers in Baltimore printed and circulated a list of their grievances:

They had submitted to three reductions of wages in three years; that they would have acquiesced in a moderate reduction; that they were frequently sent out on a trip to Martinsburg, and there detained four days at the discretion of the company, for which detention they were allowed pay but two days' time; that they were compelled to pay their board during the time they were detained, which was more than the wages they received; that they had nothing left with which to support their families; that it was a question of bread with them; that when times were dull on the road they could not get more than fifteen days' work in a month; that many sober, steady economical men became involved in debt last winter; that honest men had their wages attached because they could not meet their expenses; that by a rule of the company any man who had his wages attached should be discharged; that this was a tyranny to which no rational being should submit, and that it was utterly impossible for a man with a family to support himself and family at the reduced rate of wages. (Note: For "wages attached" see Garnishment)

By the end of July 19, the strike had spread through major cities from Baltimore to Chicago. It involved multiple rail companies, (Note: Striking lines included the Connellsville Branch, the Pittsburgh, Fort Wayne and Chicago Railway, the Erie Railroad, and the Pennsylvania Railroad System.) and had grown to include a variety of mechanics, artisans, and other laborers. General violence threatened to break out in Pittsburgh and the city was blockaded. (Note: See Pittsburgh railway riots)

Numerous meetings and conferences of discontented workers continued across the country. A committee representing the strikers (including engineers, conductors, firemen, and brakemen) departed Baltimore to ensure solidarity along the line in demanding $2 per day. According to the edition of July 20 of The Sun, the city was peaceful, but anxious, as many awaited word of the happenings in Martinsburg, which was seen as the central point of the movement.

== The outbreak of violence ==
By Friday, July 20, about 250 trains sat idle in Baltimore as a result of the strike. John W. Garrett, president of the B&O, requested that Maryland Governor John Lee Carroll move state troops from Baltimore to Cumberland, where the situation had deteriorated. At 4:00 pm Brigadier General James R. Herbert was ordered by Governor Carroll to muster the troops of the 5th and 6th Regiments, Maryland National Guard, to their respective armories in preparation. With the knowledge that groups of workers had been dispersed along the lines to impede traffic, including the movement of troops, he issued a simultaneous declaration to the people of the state:

I ... by virtue of the authority vested in me, do hereby issue this my proclamation, calling upon all citizens of this State to abstain from acts of lawlessness, and aid lawful authorities in the maintenance of peace and order.

Crowds gathered at four different points in the city, and along the route it was believed the soldiers would take in order to embark on their trains. Mayor Ferdinand Latrobe issued a proclamation, reciting the riot act and ordering the crowds to disperse, but to no effect. He later sent correspondence to the governor, asking that the garrison not be taken from the city given the current state of affairs. (Note: The correspondence from Mayor Ferdinand C. Latrobe, sent July 20, 1877 read as follows: "His Excellency John Lee Carroll, Governor of Maryland. Dear Sir: In view of the condition of affairs now existing in this city, and the violent demonstration that has taken place within the last hour, I would suggest that neither of the regiments of State militia be ordered to leave Baltimore this evening. I make this suggestion after a consultation with the Commissioners of Police.") Police commissioners ordered the closing of all barrooms and saloons.

At 6:35 pm, as many workers in the city were finishing their shifts, the alarm was sounded to gather the troops of the 5th and 6th Regiments. This was the first time such an alarm had been used in the city, and it caused a great deal of excitement, and attracted yet more citizens into the streets to witness events. (Note: According to The Sun, sounding the alarm to gather the troops was originally proposed by General Herbert, but was overridden by Governor Carroll because it was feared that it would rouse public interest and cause "exaggerated alarm" among the people. When petitioned a second time by Herbert, Carroll acquiesced.)

=== The 5th Regiment ===
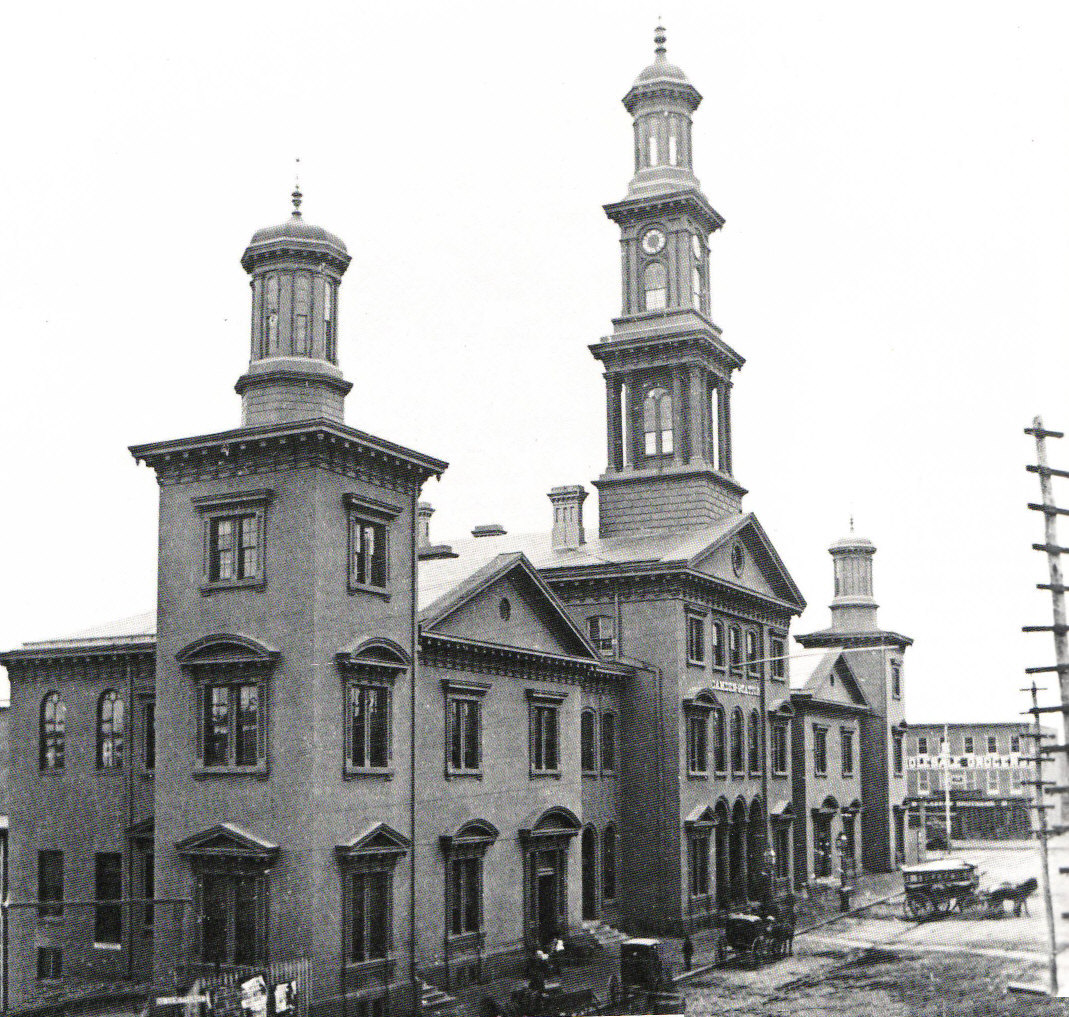
Camden Station in 1868

Between 135 and 250 men of the 5th Regiment, Maryland National Guard mustered at their armory on the corner of Fifth and Front streets. (Note: McCabe and Martin put the strength of the 5th squarely at 200, and Scharf puts the number at 250. According to Meekin, prior to the events of July 20, the strength of the regiment had been reduced to 175, and some of these were away when the call was given to muster, so that when Captain Zollinger took command of the force, only 135 were present. Later, in his address to the state legislature, Governor Carroll put the strength of the 5th at 250 arriving at Camden Station.) Each man was equipped with full uniform, a Springfield breech loading rifle, and twenty rounds of ammunition. At 7:00 pm the group began its march toward Camden Station, with the intention to board a train to Cumberland.

Onlookers had gathered to watch the procession, (Note: Laurie puts the size of the crowds at 15,000, although he does not differentiate between those encountered by the two units.) and the soldiers were attacked on Eutaw Street by crowds throwing bricks and stones. (Note: McCabe and Martin recorded a confrontation at the corner of Eutaw and Lombard, while Meekins recorded a confrontation at Eutaw and Franklin. It is not clear whether these were two separate occurrences or confused details of the same. Both sources recorded a confrontation on Eutaw near Camden.) No serious damage was done, and they continued until again, on Eutaw near Camden Street, they were stopped by the crowd, who injured several with their missiles.

The order was given and the group formed up across the entire street, from curb to curb. They fixed bayonets and advanced. Shots were fired at the troops, but they successfully moved through the crowd and into the station.

=== The 6th Regiment ===
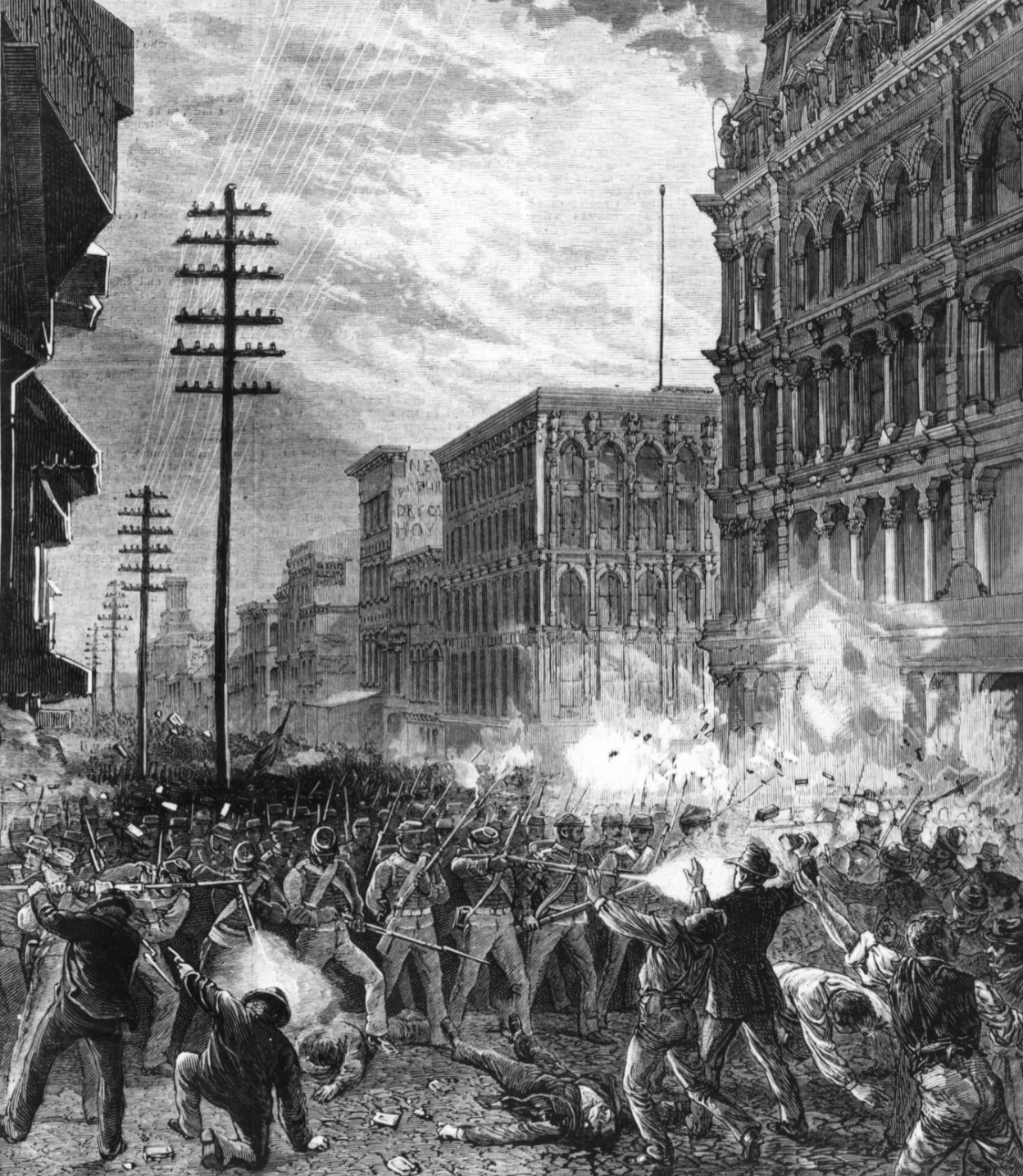
The 6th Regiment fighting its way through Baltimore

Around 6:30 pm the soldiers of the 6th Regiment began assembling. Their armory, located on Front Street across from the Phoenix Shot Tower, consisted of the second and third floors of a warehouse, with the only exit being a narrow stairway through which no more than two men could walk abreast. (Note: The first floor of the building was utilized as a furniture factory according to an article published at the time by The Sun.)

The men were met with jeers by a crowd of 2,000 to 4,000. This escalated into paving stones thrown through the door and windows of the building. Soldiers who subsequently arrived were beaten and driven away. (Note: An unnamed soldier was thrown off a bridge but survived. MAJ A. J. George, LT Welly, and C. L. Brown were all beaten, some badly.) Additional police were sent for in hopes of clearing the way and relieving the troops of the need to use force against the crowd, but those who arrived were unable to effect any order, and were forced to shelter in the armory along with the soldiers.

Shortly after 8:00 pm, Colonel Peters ordered three companies of 120 men of the 6th to move as commanded by the governor and General Herbert to Camden Station. (Note: McCabe and Martin assert that 150 men were left behind to guard the armory; this conflicts with the report of Meekins, who put the total force of the regiment at 150. The following day The Sun reported that 150 men had been ordered to move on Camden Station, with Colonel Peters remaining as ordered at the armory with a residual force of 100. Once the companies were organized, 220 men were present, and three companies totaling 120 were dispatched for the depot.) (Note: General Herbert and his staff themselves relocated to Camden Station at 7:30 pm. The staff who accompanied him were acting adjutant general, Major Fred Duvall; judge advocate, Major T. Wallis Blackistone; quartermaster, Captain J. W. S. Brady; aids, Captain J. Mason Jamison and Captain G. W. Wood; and ordnance officer Thomas Hillen, as reported by The Sun.) As they exited, they were assaulted by stones from the crowd, believing those of the 6th Regiment were armed only with blank cartridges. The troops returned fire, with live ammunition as they were equipped, and the frightened crowd retreated west across Fayette Street Bridge. (Note: As of 2016, the approximate location of the intersection of North President Street and East Fayette Street, then the location of Fayette Street as it crossed Jones Falls. Also compare this map of Baltimore from 1874.)

Given the ongoing clashes, the men of the 6th Regiment, Company B, being the last of the formation to leave the armory, marched south, by way of Front Street, and then west along Baltimore Street, in order to avoid the crowds.

The crowd regained their resolve and, as the body marched near Harrison (Note: At the time, Harrison street intersected Baltimore Street between Jones Falls and Frederick Street. Compare this map of Baltimore from 1874.) and Frederick streets, they were attacked in the rear and made to halt by the pressing of the crowd. Without orders, some soldiers fired on the crowd, killing one and wounding between one and three. The crowd shrank back and the soldiers were allowed to continue until they had advanced to the offices of the Baltimore American newspaper, near Holliday Street, where an order was given to halt and two volleys fired into the crowd. They were forced to halt a third time as they turned onto Charles Street, and again fired on the crowd near Light Street. There two men and one boy were killed. From there they followed Charles to Camden Street and on to the station. (Note: At the time, Camden Street continued east from the station until it reached the waterfront, through the area occupied by the Baltimore Convention Center as of 2016. Compare this map of Baltimore from 1874.)

=== Attack on the depot ===
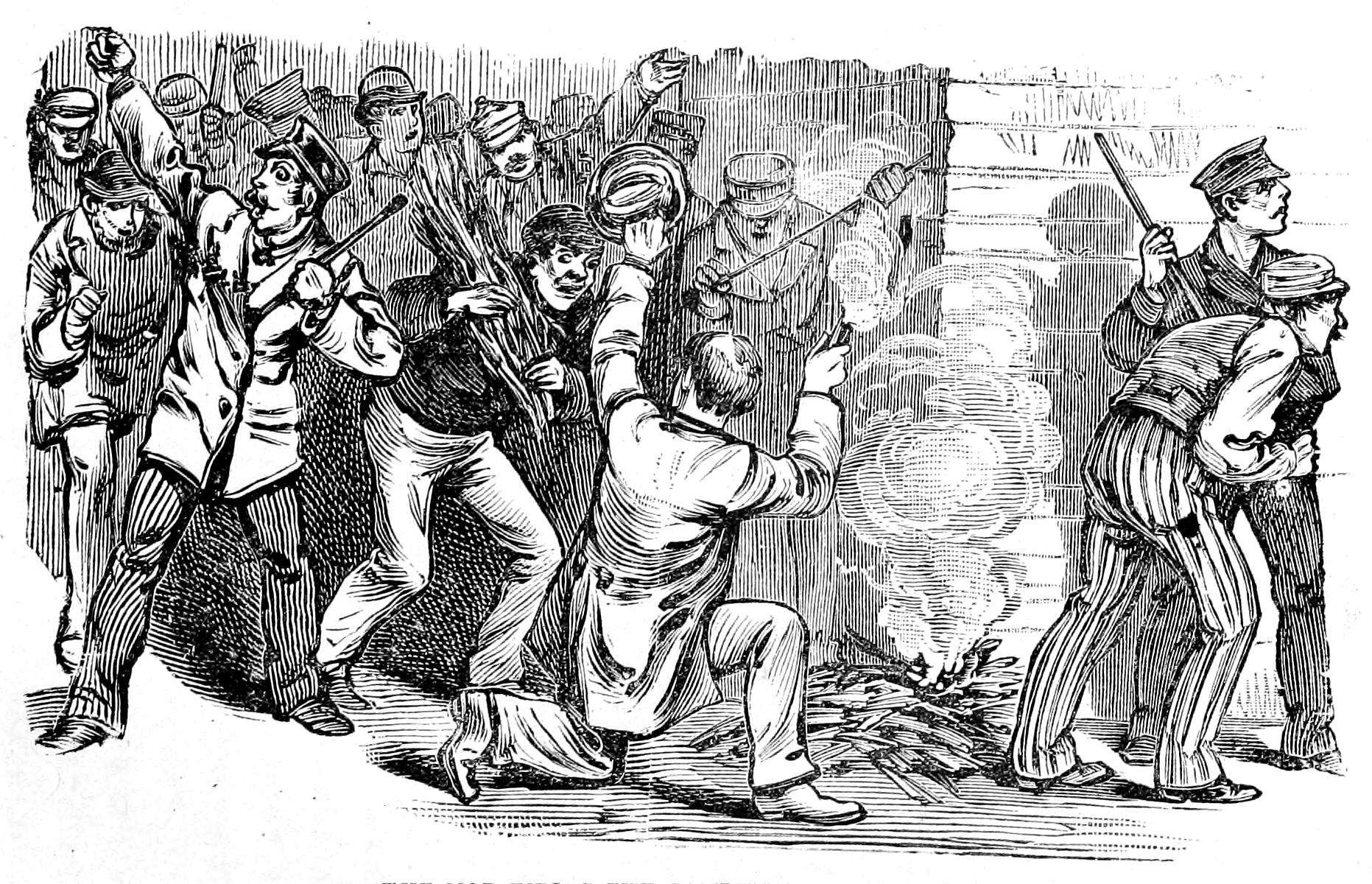
The mob attempting to set fire to Camden Station.

Around 8:30 pm, the men of the 5th and 6th regiments met at Camden Station along with about 200 police officers. As reported by The Sun, Governor Carroll and Mayor Latrobe were present at the station, along with B&O vice president King, General Herbert and his staff, and a number of police commissioners. Here they decided that conditions were too dangerous to send any troops away to Cumberland.

The train intended for the transportation of the troops consisted of 11 cars, and the engine was steamed and ready for departure. The crowd fell upon the engine, assailing it with stones, disabling it, and driving off both its engineer and fireman. At 9:15 pm another train was sent down the tracks by some from the crowd, with no one aboard, to wreck itself into yet another train. According to The Sun, the tracks were torn up from Lee Street, along Ohio Avenue to Cross Street, as well as elsewhere in the suburbs. By 10:00 pm the mob that had gathered at the station, and filled the streets for several blocks, numbered as many as 15,000. (Note: Governor Carroll, in his address to the state legislature the following year, put the size of the crowd at "several thousand".)

The soldiers and police worked to keep the mob at bay, and drove them to the far end of the station near Lee Street. (Note: At the time, Lee Street intersected Howard street at the train yards, passing through, as of 2016, the area occupied by the Federal Reserve Bank of Richmond Baltimore Branch. As of 2016, this was in the approximate area occupied by I-395, south of the intersection of Conway and Howard. Compare this map of Baltimore from 1874.) There the mob assailed the buildings of the depot with stones. At 10:30 pm the rioters set fire to passenger cars, the dispatcher's office, and the roundhouse. Some firefighters dispatched to the scene were driven off, and others had their hoses cut when they attempted to set up their pumps, but, under the protection of the police and soldiers, the flames were extinguished. The Sun reported the fires damaged one passenger car and engine, destroyed the dispatcher's office, and damaged the roof of the depot's shed. Two subsequent fires were started in the south of the city, but were dealt with without major damage.

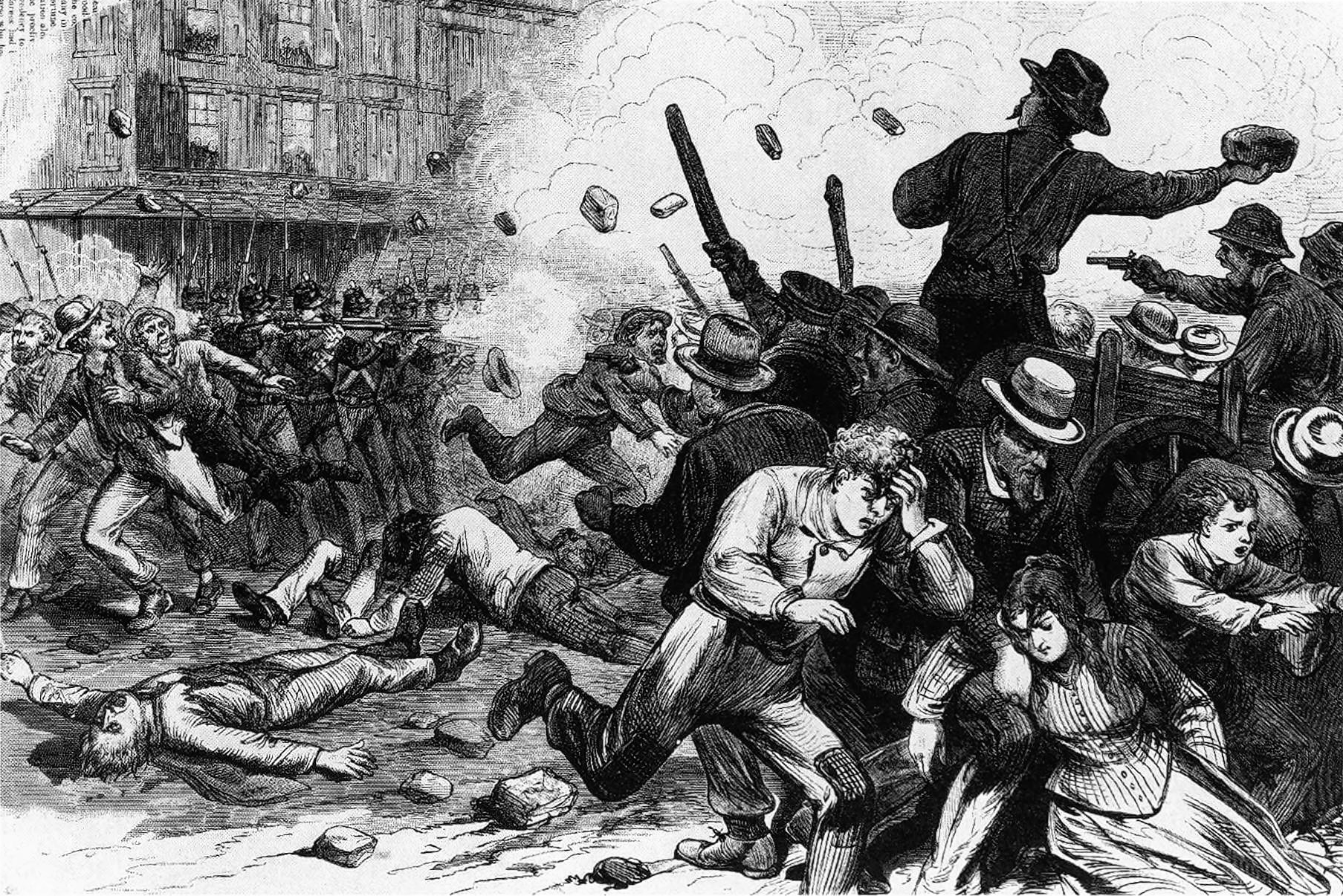
The 6th Regiment opens fire.

That night Governor Carroll requested federal assistance from President Rutherford B. Hayes, convinced that the state forces were insufficient. Hayes ordered General William Barry, commander at Fort McHenry, to hold all available forces in readiness.

The men of the 5th and 6th stayed at the depot throughout the night and into the next morning. If any needed to leave, they did so in civilian clothes and unarmed, for fear of the crowd should they be discovered to be a member of the militia. Camden Street remained under constant guard by 16 sentinels. They served in two-hour shifts, with four-hours' rest in between.

=== Casualties ===
Sources differ on the total casualties that day. By Stover's account, only 59 men of the 6th reached their destination, and the group suffered 10 killed, more than 20 seriously wounded, and several dozen more with minor injuries. By Stowell's account, only one militiaman was killed, but as many as half of their number deserted along the march. In their struggle to enter Camden Station, the 5th suffered 16 to 24 injuries, but none seriously wounded or killed. Between 9 and 12 civilians were killed, and 13-40 injured. (Note: Dacus records the names of those killed by the 6th Regiment as Thomas V. Byrne, Patrick Gill, Louis Sinovitch, Nicholas Rheinhardt, Cornelius Murphy, William Hourand, John Henry Frank, George McDowell, Otto Manck, and Mark C. Doud. James Roke and George Kemp were wounded and later died of their injuries.)

== Immediate aftermath and sporadic violence ==
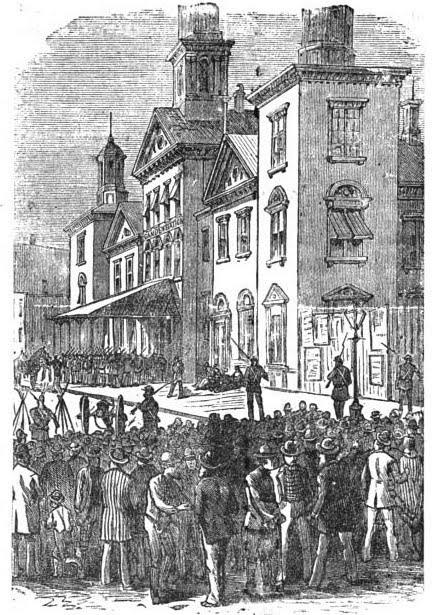
Troops guarding the Camden Street depot

Through the early hours of that Saturday, July 21, many from the 6th Regiment deserted, until only 11 were left, who were then incorporated into the ranks of the 5th. As Governor Carroll recalled: "... the slender force at my command was incompetent to protect the city, or to carry a sense of security to those who had a right be secured ..." That morning, all business remained suspended. The bars in Baltimore remained closed, and a guard of soldiers and police protected workers as they set about the task of repairing the tracks and restoring the station to operating order. Toward nightfall, a battery of artillery was stationed at the depot.

President Hayes released a proclamation in which he admonished:

all good citizens ... against aiding, countenancing, abetting or taking part in such unlawful proceedings, and I do hereby warn all persons engaged in or connected with said domestic violence and obstruction of the laws to disperse and retire peaceably to their respective abodes on or before twelve o'clock noon of the 22d day of July

After dark, a mob of 2,500–3,000 gathered at Camden Station, jeering the soldiers. The crowd grew increasingly restless until the soldiers guarding the area around the depot were again assaulted with stones and pistol fire. The sentinels were called in, the soldiers assembled, and the command given to "Load, ready, aim!" at the mob was given. The crowd, by then familiar with what was likely to follow, dispersed, and the regiment was not ordered to fire. On Eutaw Street, where the sentinels had remained, the men fixed bayonets, and briefly struggled with the crowd as they attempted and failed to break the line.

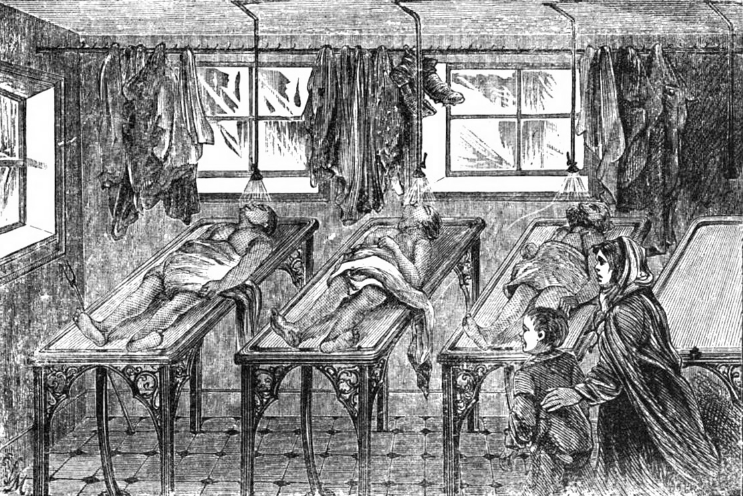
Bodies awaiting identification

Between 9:00 pm and 10:00 pm the guards enacted a strategy whereby the police officers, backed by the bayonets of the soldiers, advanced to the crowd and arrested each a man, who was then taken into the station, disarmed, and held there. The strategy was largely successful, and by 11:00 pm the area around the station was mostly cleared, though sporadic gunfire could be heard throughout the night. Between 165 and 200 were detained in total, and the most violent of the captives were removed and taken to the police station. The news reported that four, including one police officer, were injured in the exchange, and several who resisted arrest were beaten severely.

At the foundry near the Carey Street Bridge, (Note: The brass foundry, iron foundry and blacksmith shop were, at the time, in the location occupied as of 2014 by the shopping center, Mt. Clare Junction, at the corner of West Pratt Street and Carey Street.) a crowd of more than 100 gathered and threatened to set fire to the area. A contingent of the 5th under Captain Lipscomb arrived, and a volley fired over the heads of the crowd was sufficient to dissuade the crowd. An unsuccessful attempt was also made to burn a B&O transportation barge at Fell's Point. The news reported that 16 were arrested in a confrontation between citizens and the police at Lee and Eutaw, and that during the night, three separate attempts were made to set fire the 6th Regiment armory, but all were frustrated by the remaining garrison there.

Just before midnight, 120–135 marines arrived at the station and reported to the governor, who ordered them to set about capturing the leaders of the mob. Governor Carroll telegraphed and advised President Hayes that order had been restored in the city.

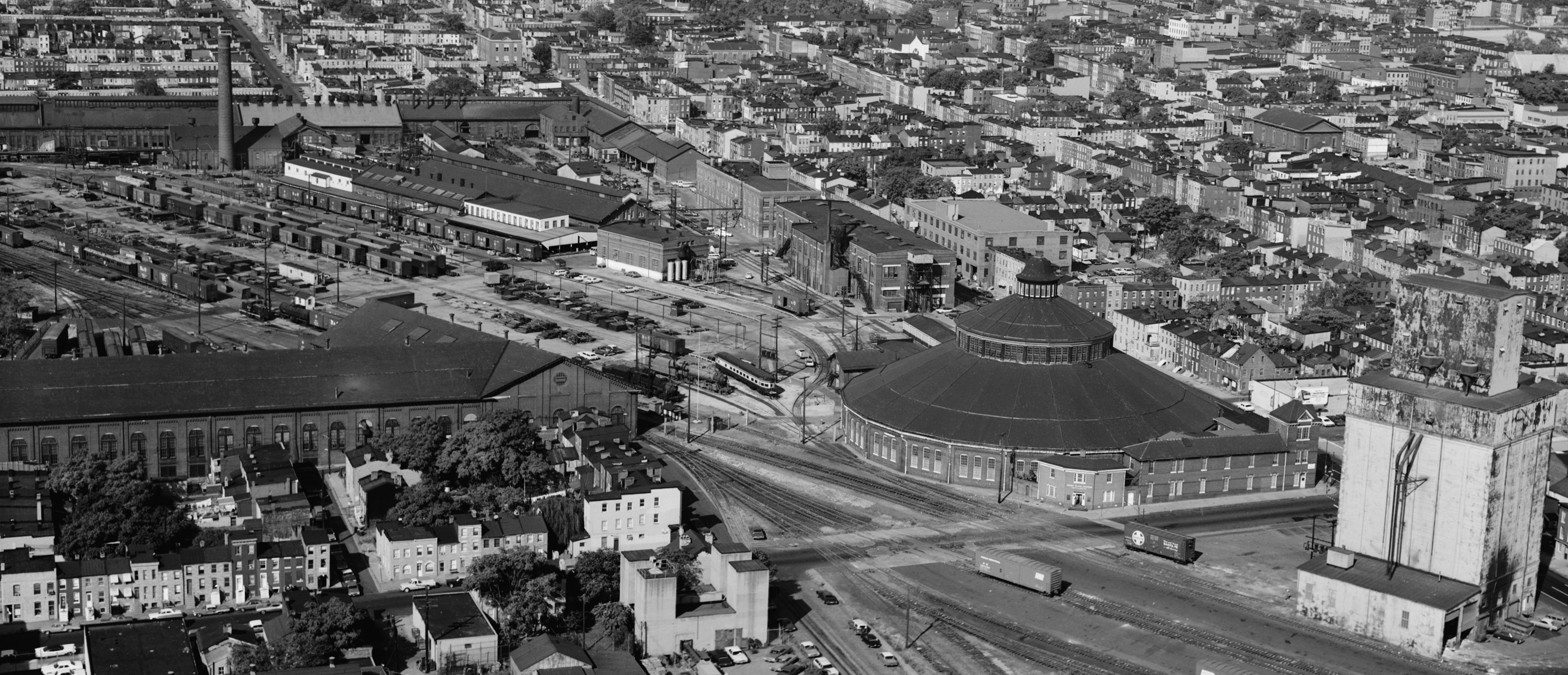
Mount Clare Shops in 1971. The circular Passenger Car Shop (1884) and Mt. Clare Depot (1851) are located in center right. Left: Passenger Car Shop and Paint Shop (1870). Buildings demolished after 1971: Lower right: Grain Elevator (1910). Top left to top center: Blacksmith Shop (1866), Brass Foundry and Iron Foundry (1864).

Between 2:00 am and 3:00 am on Sunday morning, July 22, the peace was again broken and fire alarms began to ring throughout the city. To the west, at the Mount Clare Shops of the B&O, a 37-car train of coal and oil had been set on fire. Police, firefighters, and thousands of citizens flocked to the scene. A contingent of 50 marines was dispatched to the area to provide assistance. The cars which had not yet caught fire were detached from those burning, and by the time the flames were extinguished between seven and nine cars had been burned. Between $11,000 and $12,000 in damage was sustained.

At 4:00 am another alarm sounded: the planing mills and lumber yard of J. Turner & Cate near the Philadelphia Wilmington & Baltimore rail depot, had been set on fire. The entire property, extending over a full city block, was destroyed. Realizing the severity of the situation, the firefighters concentrated their efforts on trying to save the surrounding structures.

According to news reports, the first passenger trains left the city at 9:00 am, and continued running throughout the day. Around 10:00 am, General W. S. Hancock arrived and was followed by 360–400 federal troops from New York and Fort Monroe, who relieved those guarding Camden Station. They brought with them two 12-pounder artillery pieces. From that point on, the men of the 5th and the federal troops took turns guarding the station.

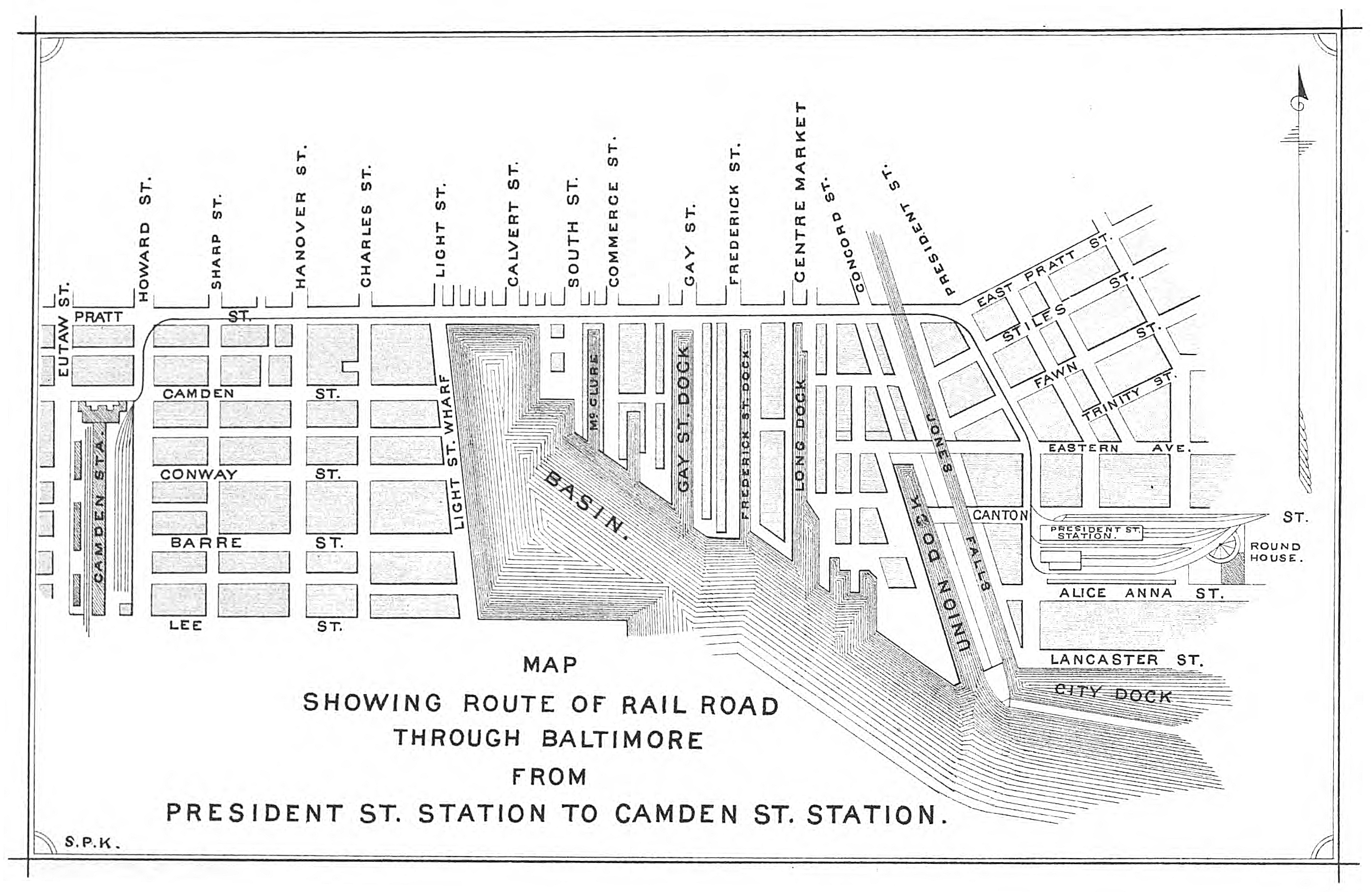
Map of the route from President Street Station (right) to Camden Station (left) as of 1861

Around noon, General Henry Abbot arrived at President Street with a battalion of 99 to 114 engineers. (Note: Meekins puts the number at seven officers and 107 men. The Sun, reporting on June 26 puts the number at 99 men plus Abbot himself.) As the group advanced toward the armory of the 6th Regiment where they were to be quartered, they were met by a crowd of 500. Jeers from the crowd turned to missiles until one soldier, Private Corcoran, was struck in the head and wounded. Abbot gave orders that his men were to halt and fix bayonets, at which point the crowd scattered.

Throughout the day and the previous, as many as 500 new special police were sworn in, doubling the size of the police force. Each was provided with a star, a revolver and espantoon. The recently arrived regulars brought the garrison of federal troops in the city to between 700 and 800. The vessels Powhatan and Swatara had also been ordered to the city, along with their 500 marines.

News reports recalled court held that day in the southern district, where 195 charges of riot and 17 charges of drunkenness were resolved. That night the city was quiet. (Note: At this point, McCabe largely leaves the story in Baltimore, and moves on to canal stoppages along the border with West Virginia, and the riots in Pittsburgh.) A telegram was dispatched from Adjutant General Edward D. Townsend to General Hancock, who had just arrived in the city earlier that day. He was directed to move his men to Pittsburgh, where riots were ongoing.

== The 7th and 8th regiments ==
Following the cessation of open violence, the city set about forming two new regiments of national guard to expand available forces. The local news recounted on the 24th, that Abbot's engineer corps had re-purposed the armory of the 5th Regiment for use as a recruiting station, toward the goal of forming the newly authorized 8th Regiment, to include a company of artillery. They brought with them from the armory of the 6th, two howitzers, 2,000 rounds of ammunition, and 250 muskets. The Governor and Adjutant General put out a call for volunteers to fill each regiment with 1,000 men. General James Howard was chosen to command the 7th, and General Charles E. Phelps the 8th.

According to reports in The Sun, the following day at 3:00 pm, those who were left of the original 6th Regiment disbanded. No official order was given to this effect, but their duties had by this point been entirely assumed by federal troops, the soldiers of the 5th, and the newly formed 7th and 8th. The armory of the 6th remained guarded by a single police officer.

== Negotiations ==
On Thursday, July 26, a committee from the engineers, firemen, brakemen, and conductors met with Governor Carroll, as recounted in the following day's newspapers. They presented him with a list of their unanimously adopted demands. The governor informed them that he had no power to satisfy them, which was a matter for the railroad, but assured them he intended to enforce the law and put down violence by any means necessary. The committee in turn maintained they had no connection with the violence, but merely intended to stop work until their demands were met. Carroll's reply was published in the local papers:

You have more to do than simply abstain from riotous proceedings. You must not stand behind riots and let violators of the law promote the destruction of property. You are responsible for the violence that has been done, whether you were actually engaged in it or not. You on your part must drive away from you the evil-disposed people who have done so much harm, and discountenance in the plainest way everything tending to violence.

The next day, it was reported that some railways throughout the country resumed traffic, though the B&O remained idle. B&O vice president King published a reply to the demands of the strikers, saying that they could not be met for lack of work and low prices for hauling freight. He wrote that the choice of the company was to either lay off many men and retain only those for whom they had work, or to spread what work was to be done among its employees; they chose the latter as the more humane. He continued:

The experience of the last ten days must satisfy everyone that if freight trains are stopped on the Baltimore and Ohio Railroad, the city of Baltimore is not only deprived of the great commercial advantages which she has heretofore enjoyed, but the entire community is made to feel that all business must be seriously crippled and the price of all kinds of family supplies greatly increased.

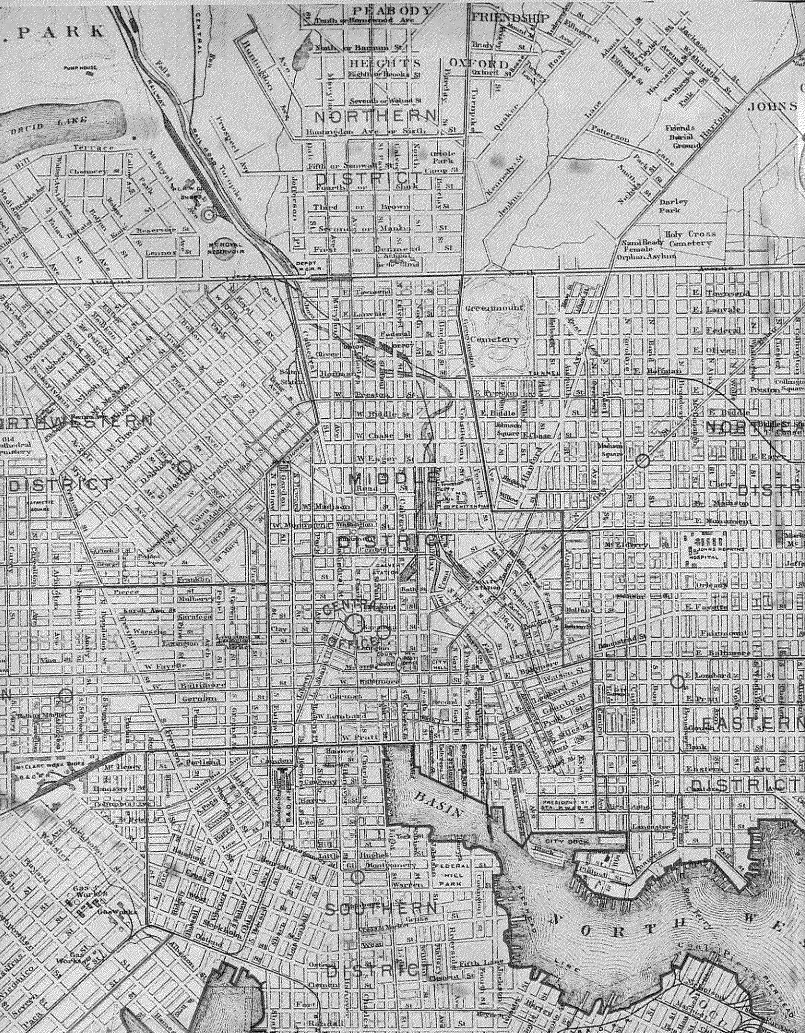
Detail from a Charity Organization Society map of Baltimore, ca. 1880 indicating the probable police district boundaries, and showing the area where the riots took place, including Camden Station near the intersection of the Northwestern, Middle, and Southern districts

Later that evening, second vice president Keyser, upon the request of the strikers, addressed a workingmen's meeting at Cross Street Market Hall, and presented the company's written response reprinted in the papers for the public. The letter, signed by both King and Keyser, stated the company's position as follows: the company would not negotiate on the matter of the 10 percent wage reduction, but it would "be pleased to address itself to the investigation of any of the minor grievances of which the men complained". The Baltimore American and Commercial Advertiser reported a general hope that, owing to the imminent increase in traffic due to the transport of harvested crops, the firemen would be able to make daily round trips, thus avoiding layovers, and that the company could arrange for them to return home on passenger trains when this was not feasible.

Keyser's reprinted response advised that the ten percent cut was "forced upon the company", but that he was confident they would be able to provide more full employment, and thus increase wages, due to an abundance of freight to be moved. He said that a system of passes would be arranged to address the issue of idle time caused by delays. He entreated the men that if the situation could not be resolved, it must "bring want and suffering upon all; suffering from which you and your families cannot hope to be exempt." He asserted that, although 90 percent of rail workers had accepted the reduction, the whole business of the railroad and city had been halted due to the 10 percent rejecting them, and resolving to not allow the rest of the men to continue work. He said the rescinding of the wage cuts were "entirely out of the question" and requested the men either return to work, or allow those who would to resume working. As The Sun reported: "A vote was taken, and the proposition of the company was rejected unanimously."

== Resumption of freight traffic ==
The force gathered at Camden Station at 8:30 am on Saturday, July 29, included 250 federal troops, 250 men of the 5th Maryland Regiment, and 260 policemen. Under this guard, freight traffic once again resumed in and out of Baltimore. That day between 8 and 34 trains were dispatched in total. (Note: Meekins reports "about a dozen" dispatched. The Sun reported 34. The Baltimore American reported eight.)

The newspapers reported the resumption of business and the glut of stalled products pouring through the city, including:

- 4,000,000 US gallons (15,000,000 L; 3,300,000 imp gal) of petroleum,
- 1,250,000 US bushels (44,000,000 L; 10,000,000 US dry gal; 9,700,000 imp gal) of wheat,
- 250,000 US gallons (950,000 L; 210,000 imp gal) of coal oil,
- 1,463 head of cattle, and
- 90 car loads of coal.

Between the 30th and the 1st, The Sun reported that the remaining strikers had declared they would not interfere, but were confident the company would be unable to find sufficient workers without them, and that by remaining united, they could yet see their terms met. Given notice to report to work on Monday, July 30 or be discharged from the company, most chose discharge, but the company had little trouble in acquiring the workers needed to run the trains.

On Wednesday, August 1, The Baltimore American and Commercial Advertiser summarized the situation as it then stood:

The strikers have gained absolutely nothing by the movement. The ten per cent reduction has been enforced by the four trunk lines, and the only concessions were those that might have been had for asking, without the loss of a single day's work. Such of the strikers as were caught committing criminal acts are now under arrest, and the great majority of the rest are most anxious to resume their places. Some of the railroad companies have discharged every man that took part in the strike, while others have only dropped the ringleaders, and have held out inducements to the others to return to work.

== Aftermath and legacy ==
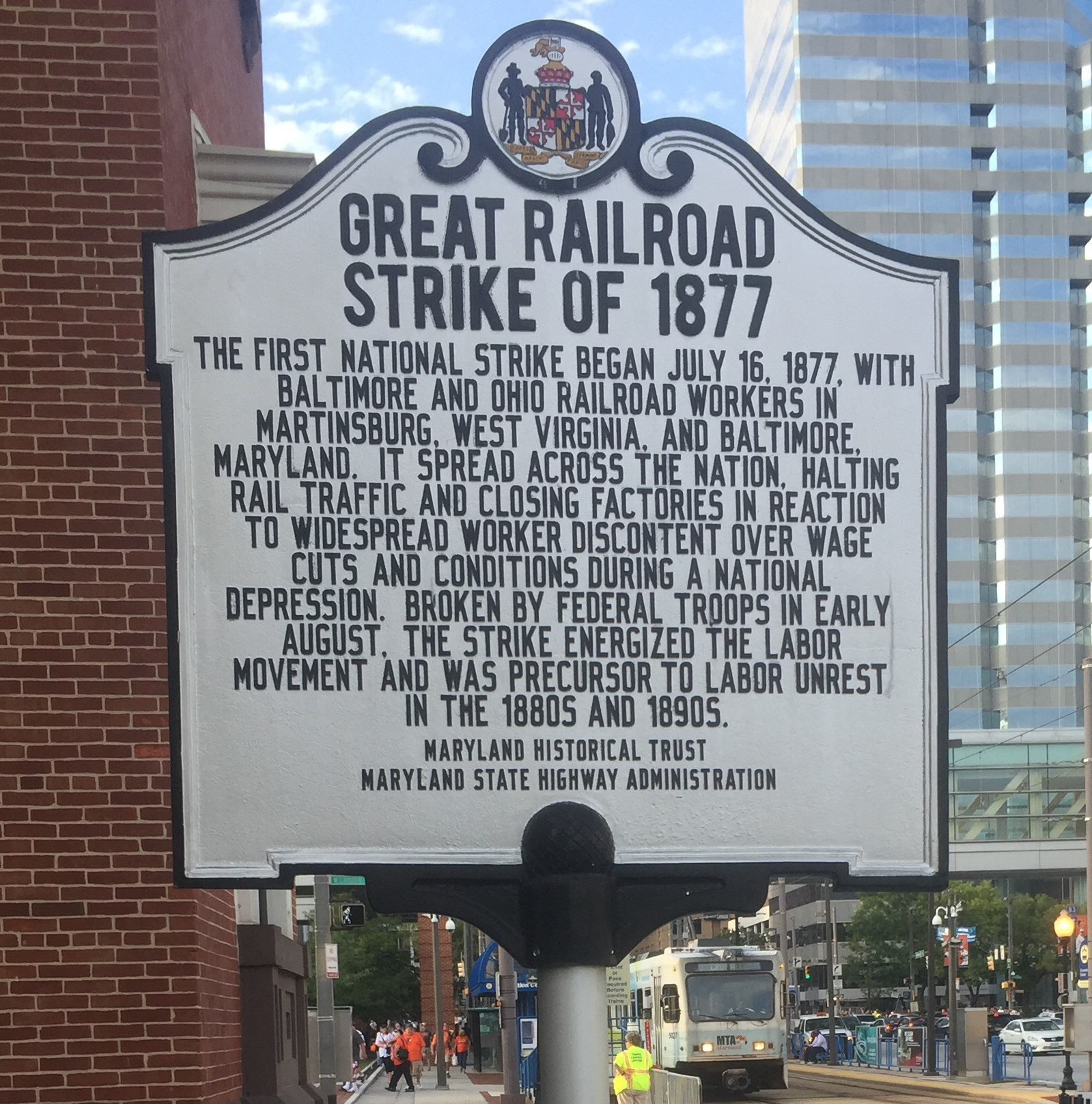
Historical marker in Baltimore unveiled in 2013

By the time peace was completely restored in the city, the cost to the state for suppression of the mob was between $80,000 and $85,000. Later that year, the B&O agreed to a number of reforms: crewmen would not be called to work more than an hour before a train's departure, crews were to be paid a quarter of a day's pay if the train they were working was canceled, and passes were to be given for men working who had long layovers. In 1880, the B&O Employees Relief Association was established.

The first parade of the 5th Regiment through the city following the crisis was on October 15. They marched that day with, according to contemporary accounts, 400 counted among their ranks. In 1901, a new armory for the 5th was completed on West Hoffman Street, and is now included on the National Register of Historic Places.

The following year, Governor Carroll addressed the General Assembly of the Maryland Legislature, and offered his appraisal of what had occurred in Baltimore:

Undoubtedly the extraordinary depression which has existed for the past four years in all branches of business, compelled the great railway lines to make reductions in their expenditures, and thus the numbers of unemployed have been constantly added to.

The want and suffering produced by such a condition of the working classes is always an evil greatly to be deplored, but one, unfortunately, that cannot be reached by immediate legislation. The great and only remedy for unemployed labor, is the revival of business, and the encouragement of a judicious political system by which it will be brought about.

In 2013, a historical marker was placed on the Howard Street side of Camden Station. It was state-funded and coordinated by the Maryland Historical Trust and the Maryland State Highway Administration. The text of the marker was proposed by Bill Barry, Director of Labor Studies at the Baltimore County Community College.

== See also ==
- Great Railroad Strike of 1922
- Great Southwest railroad strike of 1886
- List of incidents of civil unrest in Baltimore
- List of incidents of civil unrest in the United States
- List of worker deaths in United States labor disputes
- Timeline of labor issues and events
- Bibliography of Rutherford B. Hayes
- Timeline of the Rutherford B. Hayes presidency
- Outline of Rutherford B. Hayes
