= 1968 Baltimore riot =

Civil unrest between April 6 and 14, 1968

Baltimore riot of 1968
- Part of the King assassination riots
- Date: April 6, 1968 – April 14, 1968
- Location: Baltimore, Maryland, United States; 39°17′41″N 76°36′22″W
- Caused by: Assassination of Martin Luther King Jr.
- Methods: Rioting, race riots, protests, looting, attacks

Parties
Federal government of the United States; US Army XVIII Airborne Corps; 197th Infantry Brigade; Government of Maryland; Maryland Army National Guard; Maryland Air National Guard; City of Baltimore; Baltimore Police Department	Rioters

Casualties
- Deaths: 6
- Injuries: 900
- Arrested: 5,800+

The Baltimore riot of 1968 was a period of civil unrest that lasted from April 6 to April 14, 1968, in Baltimore. The uprising included crowds filling the streets, burning and looting local businesses, and confronting the police and national guard.

The immediate cause of the riot was the April 4 assassination of Martin Luther King Jr. in Memphis, Tennessee, which triggered unrest in over 100 cities across the United States. These events are sometimes described as the Holy Week Uprising.

Spiro Agnew, the Governor of Maryland, called out thousands of National Guard troops and 500 Maryland State Police to quell the disturbance. When it was determined that the state forces could not control the rebellion, Agnew requested Federal troops from President Lyndon B. Johnson.

== Background ==
Between World War II and 1968, Baltimore had changed demographically. The total population remained constant, but the black percentage of the total population had grown, while other populations shrank (a shift of 200,000 people). Black communities had sub-par housing, high rates of infant mortality, and more crime. They also suffered disproportionately from the decline in Baltimore's manufacturing sector. Black unemployment was more than double the national rate, and even higher in especially poor communities. Those who did have jobs were paid less and worked in unsafe conditions.

== Course of events ==
With the spread of civil disturbances across the nation, Maryland National Guard troops were called up for state duty on April 5, 1968, in anticipation of disturbances in Baltimore or the suburban portions of Maryland bordering Washington, D.C.

Black Baltimore was quiet on April 5, despite riots in nearby Washington, D.C. One white student at UMBC reported a quiet scene, with noticeable sadness, but little violence or unrest: April 5, "in many cases, was just another day".

Baltimore remained peaceful into the day on April 6. Three hundred people gathered peacefully around noon for a memorial service, which lasted until 2 p.m. without incident. Street traffic began to increase. A crowd formed on Gay St. in East Baltimore, and by 5 p.m. some windows on the 400 block had been smashed. Police began to move in. People began to report fires after 6 p.m. Soon after, the city declared a 10 p.m. curfew and called in 6,000 troops from the national guard. Sales of alcohol and firearms were immediately banned. At this point, some reports described about a thousand people in the crowd, which moved north on Gay St. up to Harford Rd. and Greenmount Ave. Mayor Thomas D'Alesandro III was unable to respond effectively. Around 8 p.m., Governor Agnew declared a state of emergency.

Many Black Businesses managed to avoid the destruction by painting the words "Soul Brother" on their doors or windows, and the rioters knew not to attack that business.

By the morning of April 7, reports to the White House described five deaths, 300 fires, and 404 arrests. Unrest also broke out on Pennsylvania Ave in West Baltimore. At one point, white counter-rioters assembled near Patterson Park; they dispersed after National Guard troops prevented them from entering a black neighborhood.

Violence decreased after April 9, and the Baltimore Orioles played their opening game the next day, though the April 12 James Brown concert remained canceled. On the afternoon of April 9, federal troops dispersed crowds at a permitted peace rally, apparently unaware that General Gelston had issued a permit for the event. The situation was defused by Major William "Box" Harris, the highest-ranking police officer in the city.

== Military response ==
When violent protest broke out in Baltimore on April 6, nearly the entire Maryland National Guard, both Army and Air, were called up to deal with the unrest. The notable exceptions were the state's air defense units (which managed surface-to-air missile sites around the state), those units already on duty in the Washington, D.C., area, and a unit positioned in Cambridge, Maryland (the site of race riots in 1963 and 1967). The Adjutant General of Maryland, Major General George M. Gelston, commanded the National Guard force and also was given control of local and state police forces in the city (approximately 1,900 police officers).

The combined National Guard and police force proved unable to contain the uprising. On Sunday, April 7, federal troops were requested, and the President invoked the Insurrection Act of 1807. Late that evening, elements of the XVIII Airborne Corps at Fort Bragg, North Carolina, began arriving on the scene, while several Marine units from Camp Lejeune were put on standby status. With the intervention of federal forces, the Maryland National Guard was called into federal duty, resulting in a shift from state control (reporting to the Governor of Maryland) to federal control (reporting through the Army chain of command to the President). The federal force, Task Force Baltimore, was organized into three brigades and a reserve. These were (roughly), the XVIII Airborne Corps troops, the Maryland National Guard, and troops from the 197th Infantry Brigade from Fort Benning, Georgia (which arrived two days later). The 1,300 troops of the Maryland Air National Guard were organized in a provisional battalion and used to guard critical infrastructure throughout the city, as well as an ad hoc detention facility at the Baltimore Civic Center. Task Force Baltimore peaked at 11,570 Army and National Guard troops on April 9, of which all but about 500 were committed to riot control duties.

Unrest continued for several days as the Task Force sought to reassert control. Early on April 12, federal troops began to depart and by 6 p.m. that evening responsibility for riot control returned to the National Guard. At midnight Task Force Baltimore ceased to exist and the remainder of federal troops were withdrawn. Maryland National Guard troops remained on duty in the city until April 14, when Agnew declared the emergency over and sent them home.

After action reports credited both the National Guard and active Army forces for being extremely disciplined and restrained in dealing with the disturbance, with only four shots fired by National Guard troops and two by active Army troops. These forces had received orders to avoid firing their weapons, as part of an intentional strategy to decrease fatalities.

A total of 10,956 troops had been deployed.

=== Organization of Task Force Baltimore ===
- Task Force XVIII Abcar
  - 4th Battalion, 39th Artillery Regiment
  - 4th Battalion, 73rd Artillery Regiment
  - 47th Engineer Battalion
- Task Force 197
  - 1st Battalion, 29th Infantry Regiment
  - 1st Battalion, 58th Infantry Regiment
  - 5th Battalion, 31st Infantry Regiment
- Task Force Oscar
  - Task Force Emergency Headquarters Brigade
    - Headquarters and Headquarters Company, EOH
    - 1st Battalion, 175th Infantry Regiment
    - 2nd Battalion, 115th Infantry Regiment (later detached to TF Abcar)
    - 729th Maintenance Battalion (Now 729th Support Battalion, MDARNG)
    - 2nd Battalion, 110th Field Artillery Regiment
    - C Company, 728th Maintenance Battalion
    - 110th Collection, Classification and Salvage Company
    - B Company, 19th Special Forces Group
    - C Company, 103rd Medical Battalion
    - 1204th Transportation Company
  - Task Force Third Brigade
    - Headquarters and Headquarters Company, 3rd Brigade
    - 2nd Battalion, 175th Infantry Regiment
    - 1st Battalion, 115th Infantry Regiment
    - 121st Engineer Battalion
    - Headquarters and Headquarters Detachment, 115th Military Police Battalion
    - 200th Military Police Company
    - 1229th Transportation Company
    - B Troop, 1st Squadron, 223rd Cavalry
    - C Company, 103rd Engineer Battalion
    - Admin Section, 28th Admin Company
  - Task Force Troops
    - 135th Air Commando Group
    - 175th Tactical Fighter Group
    - 136th Evacuation Hospital
    - D Troop, 1st Squadron, 223rd Cavalry
    - 229th Army Band
    - 29th Military Police Company
    - 2nd Platoon, 28th Military Police Company
    - 2nd Platoon, B Company, 228th Supply and Transportation Battalion
    - 2nd Forward Supply Section, A Company, 228th Supply and Transportation Battalion
- Other participating forces:
  - 50th Signal Battalion

== Outcome ==
=== Damage ===
In the next few days, six people died, 700 were injured, and 5,800 were arrested. One thousand small businesses were damaged or robbed. Property damages, assessed financially, were more severe in DC ($15 million), Baltimore ($12 million), and Chicago ($10 million) than in any other cities.

In addition, an active Army soldier died in a traffic crash while redeploying from the city. Rioters set more than 1,200 fires during the disturbance. Damage was estimated at over $12 million (equivalent to $77.5 million today).

Of the arrests, 3,488 were for curfew violations, 955 for burglary, 665 for looting, 391 for assault, and five for arson.

=== Legacy ===
One of the major outcomes of the uprising was the attention Agnew received when he criticized local black leaders for not doing enough to help stop the disturbance. These statements caught the attention of Richard Nixon, who was looking for someone on his ticket who could counter George Wallace's American Independent Party third party campaign. Agnew became Nixon's vice presidential running mate in 1968.

The uprising had broken out mainly in the black neighborhoods of East and West Baltimore in which extensive property damage and looting occurred. Many of the businesses destroyed in the uprising were located along the main commercial avenues of the neighborhoods and were often owned by Baltimore Jews.

Media and academic coverage of the events has been thin, partly because the event remains emotional for those involved. In April 2008, for the fortieth anniversary of the events, the University of Baltimore organized an exhibit, "Baltimore '68: Riots and Rebirth." It utilized oral history testimonies from people who lived through the unrest. It was the first major academic project to focus on these events.

== See also ==
- History of Baltimore#1968 riots
- List of incidents of civil unrest in Baltimore
- List of incidents of civil unrest in the United States
