= Murders of Keona Holley and Justin Johnson =

2021 double murder in Baltimore, Maryland, U.S.

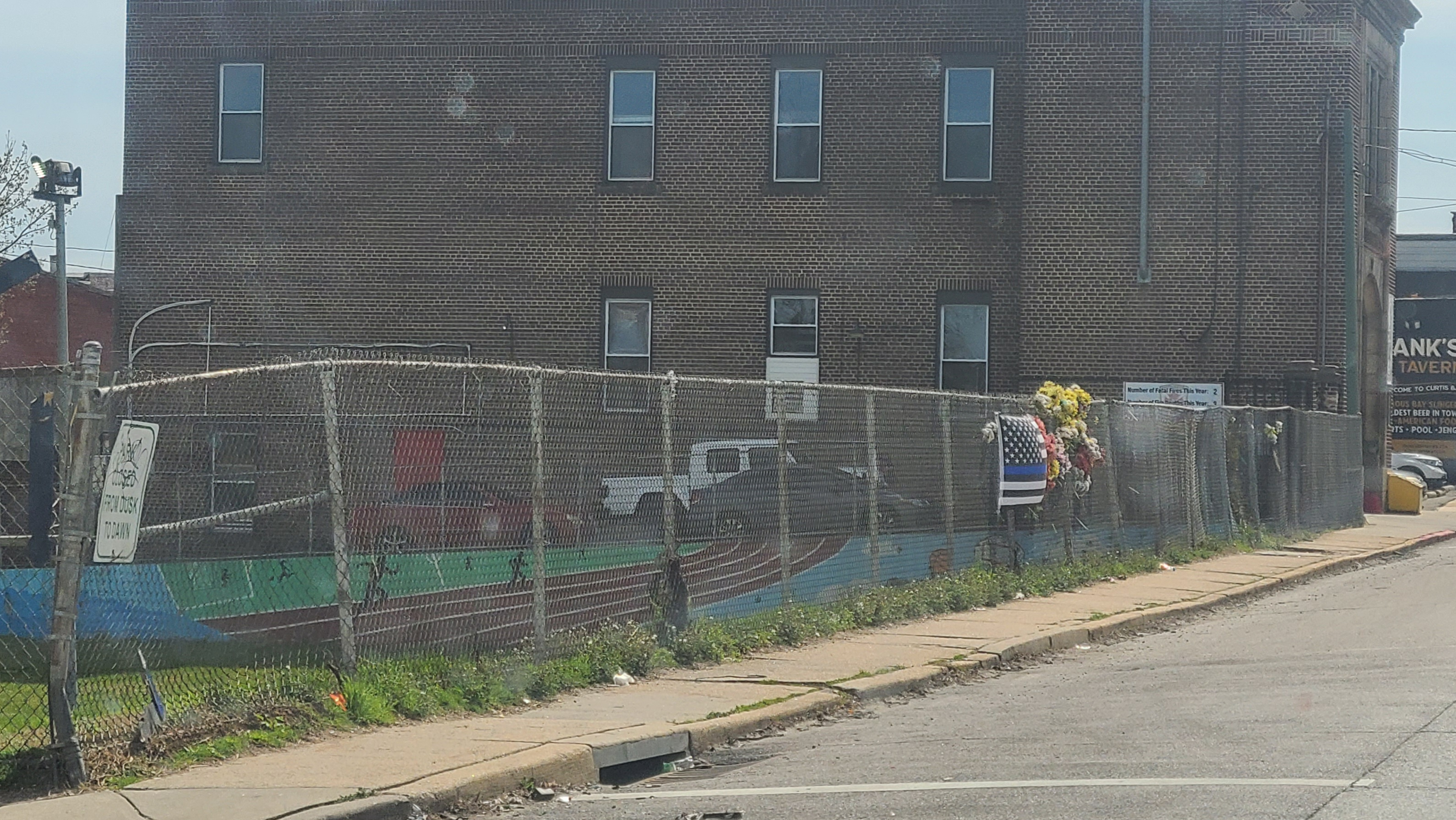
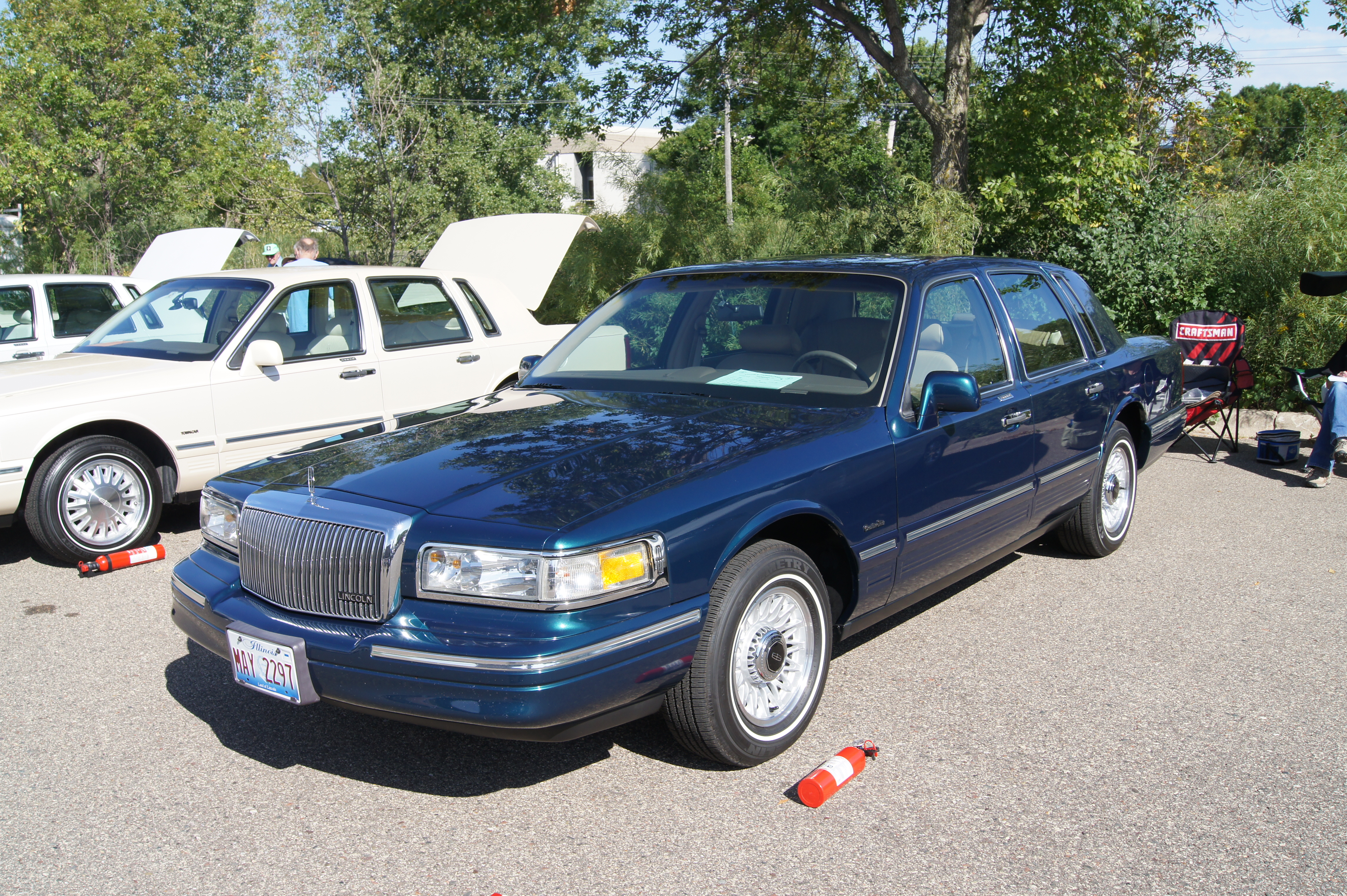
- The park where Holley was murdered as it appeared in 2024. A thin blue line U.S. flag and flowers commemorate her. A 1997 Lincoln Town Car, similar to the one Johnson was murdered in.
- 1 Murder of Holley; 2 Murder of Johnson
- Location: 39.225671°N 76.588499°W; 39.273342°N 76.692141°W; Pennington Avenue, Curtis Bay, Baltimore; Lucia Avenue, Yale Heights, Baltimore
- Date: December 16, 2021; 1:35 a.m. – 3:07 a.m. (EST)
- Attack type: Shooting
- Weapons: Glock 22; AR-style pistol
- Deaths: 2
- Perpetrators: Elliot Knox (Note: Early sources also wrote Knox's name as "Elliott".); Travon Shaw
- Verdict: Knox: Guilty on eight of nine counts; Shaw: Guilty on all counts

In the early morning of December 16, 2021, Keona Schannel Holley, a 39-year-old officer with the Baltimore Police Department, and Justin Johnson, a 38-year-old, were fatally shot one and a half hours apart in the Curtis Bay and Yale Heights neighborhoods of Baltimore, respectively. Holley joined the department in 2019, previously being employed at the Clifton T. Perkins Hospital Center, a psychiatric hospital in Jessup, Maryland. (Note: Reports conflict on Holley's position at Clifton T. Perkins Hospital; while her friends claimed she was a nursing assistant, officials reported that she worked security at the hospital.) The perpetrators were identified as Elliot Knox, a 31-year-old, and Travon Shaw, a 32-year-old. Both perpetrators had previously been imprisoned for armed robbery and Shaw was set to go on trial for a 2020 firearms charge four months after the shooting.

Johnson was declared dead at the scene, while Holley remained on life support at the University of Maryland Shock Trauma Center for a week. Community members held a vigil for Holley on December 22; she was removed from life support the following day and declared dead soon after. After the shooting, Knox initially claimed to police that his car was stolen; he later admitted he was at the scenes of the murders, but was not involved in either. He led detectives to a backpack in his house which contained the guns used; DNA evidence on them matched with both Knox and Shaw. Holley was the first Baltimore police officer to be killed on duty since Sean Suiter, a detective implicated in the Gun Trace Task Force scandal, who died in 2017.

In the aftermath of Holley's death, the Officer Keona Holley Public Safety Act was proposed in the Maryland Senate, deeming criminals who helped murder a police officer because of their occupation ineligible for parole. The bill was amended to instead increase a scholarship fund for the families of killed officers, which caused Holley's family to ask that her name be removed from the bill. The street where Holley was killed was also dedicated as Officer Keona Holley Way. Knox was found guilty on eight of nine counts in March 2024 and received two back-to-back life sentences in June; Shaw was found guilty on all counts in Johnson and Holley's killings in October 2023 and March 2024, respectively, and sentenced to life in prison plus 20 years.

== Background ==
Selfie of Keona Holley

Keona Schannel Holley, also known as "KeKe" and the "Mom from the West Side", was born in 1981 or 1982. She graduated from Edmondson-Westside High School in southwestern Baltimore and received a certification as a nursing assistant from the Community College of Baltimore County, according to her family. Her first job, at the age of 16, was at a McDonald's in Baltimore County. She later became employed at the Clifton T. Perkins Hospital Center, a psychiatric hospital in Jessup, Maryland, before leaving in 2019 and joining the Baltimore Police Department (BPD) academy. She claimed her motive for joining was bringing change to an embattled department; she was serving her second year as an officer at the time of the shooting. She had four children and one grandchild.

I didn’t want to be a Baltimore police officer before. I feel like Baltimore city police officers have a bad name about themselves. We have to change that, and change it together. The community needs Baltimore city police officers that’s [sic] not just here for a paycheck. They’re here because they care.

— Holley, 2020

Justin Johnson

Justin Johnson was born in 1993 or 1994, the fourth of seven children. Johnson had five children, who were aged one to 18, at the time of his death. Johnson's mother, Justina Lawrence, described him as "just a young man trying to make it in this wicked, wicked world".

Elliot M. Knox and Travon Shaw, the two perpetrators, were born in 1989 or 1990 and 1988 or 1989, respectively. At the time of the murder, Shaw was set to go on trial, in March 2022, on a March 2020 firearms charge in Baltimore County, being convicted of assault and armed robbery in 2006. In the same year, Knox, who was then 16 years old, was convicted of three armed robberies and sentenced to 15 years in prison. While serving his sentence at the North Branch Correctional Institution, Knox sued the state of Maryland as well as corrections officers, claiming he was assaulted in prison. According to records, the case was settled outside of court, although the terms of the settlement are unknown.

== Shootings ==
Around 1:35 a.m. EST on December 16, 2021, Holley, who was working overtime in the Curtis Bay neighborhood of Baltimore, was ambushed and shot while in her patrol car. After being shot, her car accelerated across the 4400 block of Pennington Avenue, going through a fence before going over an embankment into a park. She was shot twice in the back of the head, damaging her brain and neck. Holley was sent to the University of Maryland Shock Trauma Center, where she was given emergency surgery and put on life support. Her condition was described as "critically ill" by Thomas Scalea, a chief surgeon at Shock Trauma, and "critical but stable" by commissioner of the Baltimore Police Department Michael S. Harrison.

Around 3 a.m. the same day, in the neighborhood of Yale Heights, Johnson, who was in his 1997 Lincoln Town Car on Lucia Avenue's 600 block, was shot six times in the back, injuring his heart, lungs, and spine. He was pronounced dead at the scene.

== Aftermath ==
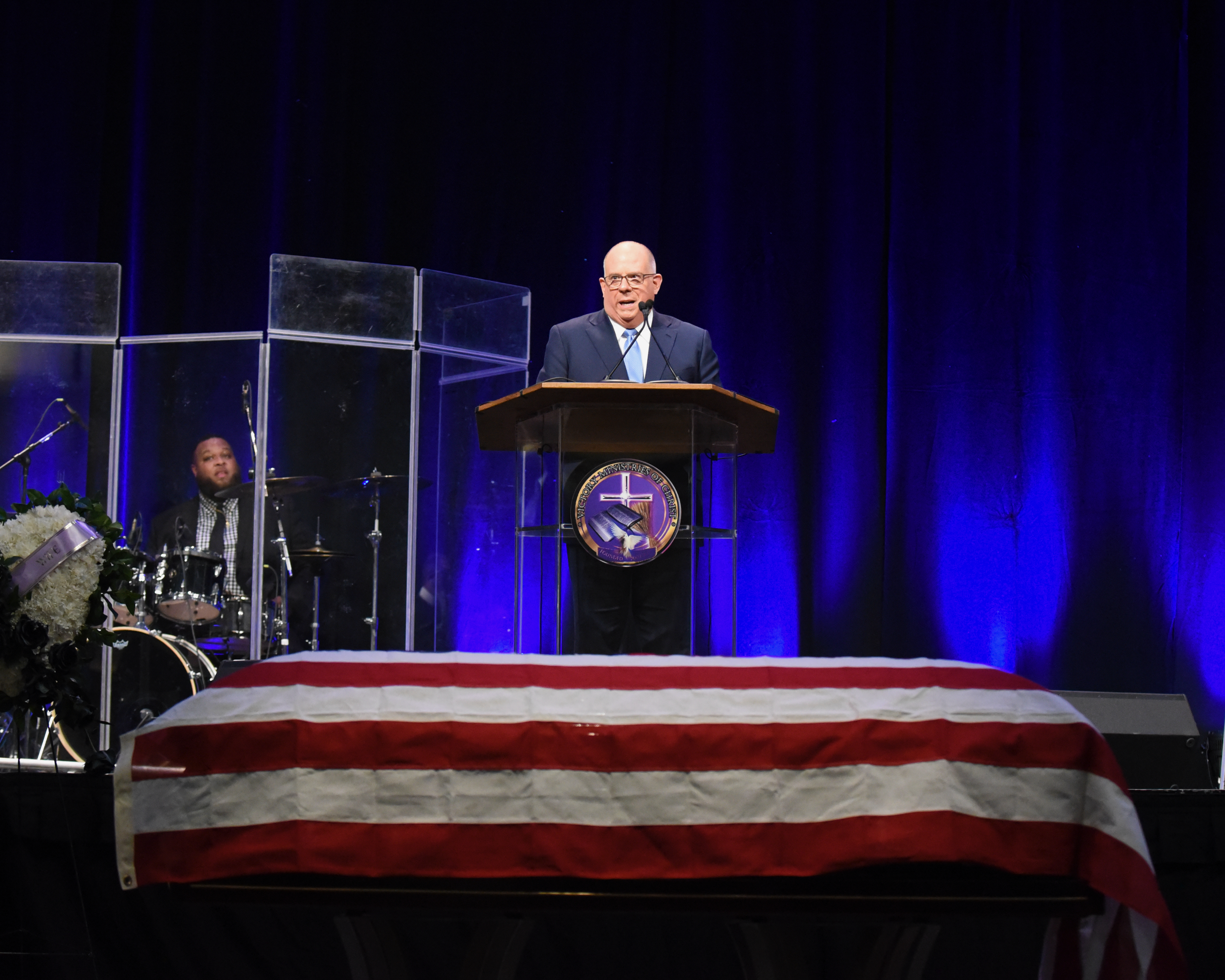
Governor of Maryland Larry Hogan speaking at Holley's funeral.

Following Holley's shooting, a bounty of up to US$59,000 was offered to people who gave tips that led to a conviction. This bounty was matched by the state of Maryland, making the combined award $118,000. Detectives found that a nearby license plate reader had detected the plate of a silver 2012 Hyundai which was registered to Knox. Nearby security cameras showed Knox's car park near Holley's patrol car. Two men walked out of the car towards Holley's car before running back to Knox's car.

In a Baltimore Police Department interview room, Knox gave up his Miranda rights and initially maintained that his car was stolen and that he was not involved in either of the murders. After two hours, he walked back these claims, admitting that he was at the scene of the shootings, but continuing that Shaw shot Holley and Johnson. He said that Shaw killed Johnson because he owed him US$100 and that Shaw said he was going to "holler" at Johnson, however, he had no idea why Shaw killed Holley, bursting into tears in the interview room. Justina Lawrence, Johnson's mother, claimed that the $100 debt was for a car.

Knox led investigators to a house in the Windsor Hills community, where a Glock 22 and an Armalite rifle-style pistol, the guns used in the shooting, were stored in two backpacks in a bedroom closet, alongside gloves, masks, magazines, boxes of bullets, and a gun cleaning kit. The .40 caliber casings at both scenes and a .223 caliber casing at the scene of Johnson's shooting matched up with the Glock 22 and AR-style pistol, respectively. DNA evidence on the pistol also matched to Knox and Shaw.

Johnson's funeral was held at March's Funeral Home on December 22. The same day, a vigil for Holley, who was at the time on life support, was held by community members, where they prayed that Holley would recover from her injuries. According to a BPD press release, Holley was removed from life support the next day, a week after being shot, and pronounced dead soon after.

Several city and state officials, including then-commissioner of the Baltimore Police Department Michael S. Harrison, Governor of Maryland Larry Hogan, then-state's attorney of Baltimore Marilyn Mosby, and Mayor of Baltimore Brandon Scott, offered their condolences after Holley's death. Hogan said that "our hearts are broken" over the loss of Holley, while Scott said that "Baltimore will never forget Officer Holley’s sacrifice and commitment to making a difference in her beloved city". She was the first BPD officer to be killed in the line of duty since Sean Suiter, a detective implicated in the Gun Trace Task Force scandal, who was shot in 2017, a day before he was set to go on trial.

Shaw was denied bond on December 20 and Knox was denied the next day. Knox's attorney asked that he receive protective custody to prevent harm from other prisoners. Rumors spread on social media that Knox had been related to a man that Holley had previously helped arrest; an investigation by The Baltimore Sun found that while Holley had been listed as a witness during the arrest of attempted murder suspect Eddie Knox, he was from upstate New York and had no known ties to Elliot.

Holley's funeral was held January 11, 2022, at the Baltimore Convention Center. Public viewings were held at Wylie Funeral Home for two days before the funeral. U.S. Senator Ben Cardin attended the first viewing, where he described Holley's murder as "a senseless gunning down of a law enforcement officer" and said that "The community has come together. We want to show our support to the family." Holley's body arrived at the Baltimore Convention Center at 7 a.m., a wake began at 9 a.m., and the funeral began at 10 a.m. Holley's funeral was attended by hundreds, including Hogan, Scott, and police officers from Texas and Illinois. After her funeral, her body arrived at King Memorial Park around 4 p.m., where she was buried.

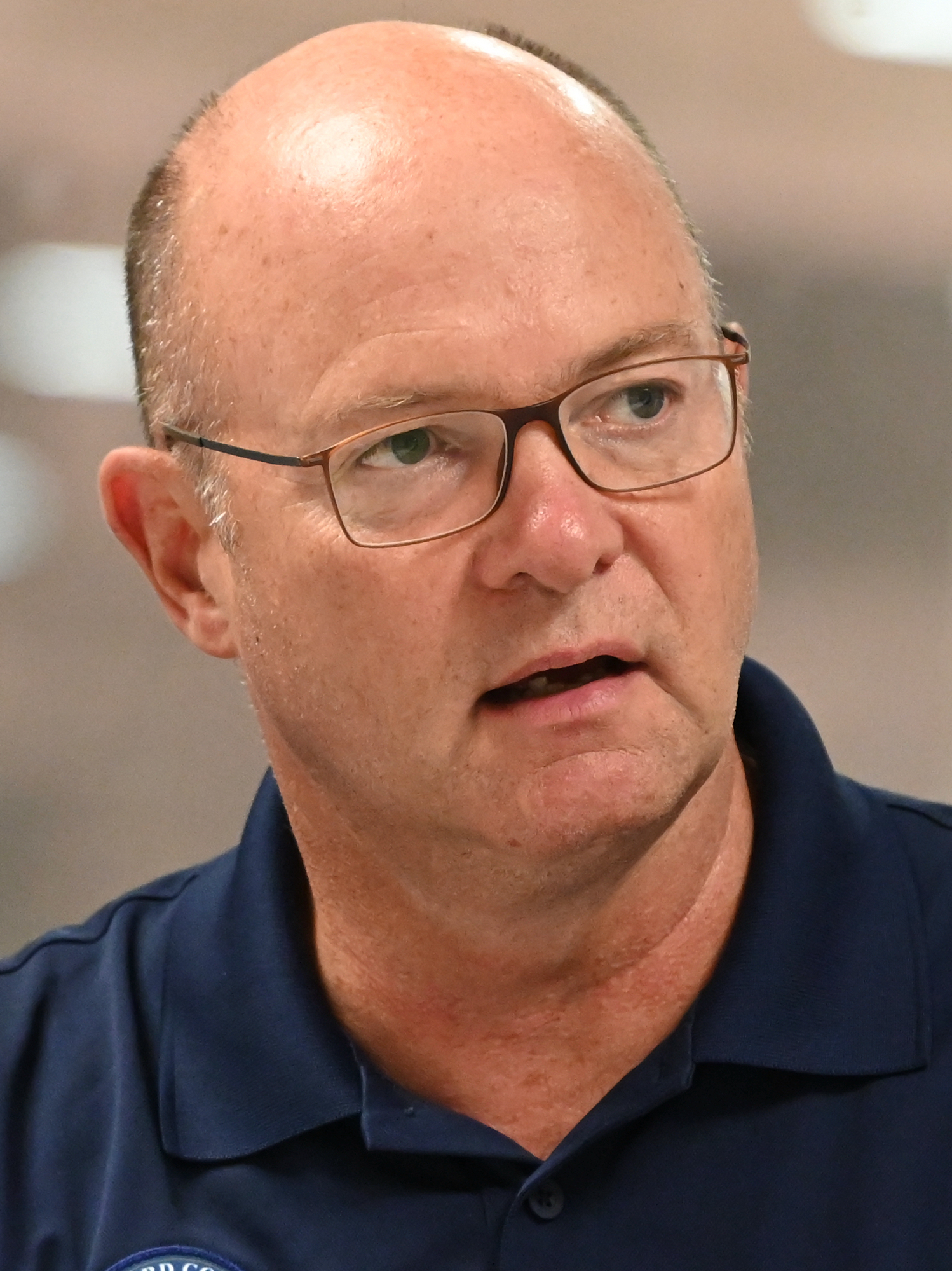
Robert Cassilly, proposer of the Officer Keona Holley Public Safety Act

In March 2022, Maryland state senator Robert Cassilly proposed Senate Bill 652, the "Officer Keona Holley Public Safety Act", deeming criminals who conspired to or assisted the murder of a police officer because of their occupation ineligible for parole. The bill was endorsed by Michael S. Harrison and Holley's family testified in favor of the bill to the Judicial Proceedings Committee. Lawanda Sykes, Holley's sister, describing Holley as someone who "went out every day and left her four children to make a difference within the community of Baltimore City." The senate amended the bill to remove the parole clause and instead expand scholarships for the families of killed public safety workers. While Jill P. Carter, a sponsor of the amendment, argued it would support Holley's children, her family asked for Holley's name to be removed from the bill, with Sykes saying that "Basically we feel like [Keona] is being made a mockery of through the bill. She was ambushed in her life and the bill has basically been ambushed. So, you completely took everything away of any criminal charges and slapped us in the face with an extension to a scholarship fund." Cassilly also opposed the amendment:

I found it a tough one to swallow because at a time when we face extreme police shortage [sic] and rising violent crime we basically are telling children of law enforcement officers that we're not going to stand behind your parents, but don't worry if mom or dad dies you get free college. This was just too cynical and absolutely the wrong message to send.

— Cassilly on the amendment to the bill

On April 29, 2022, the 4400 block of Pennington Avenue where Holley was killed was dedicated as "Officer Keona Holley Way". Several officials, including Brandon Scott, Marilyn Mosby, and Michael S. Harrison, and Holley's family, attended and spoke at the dedication. Sykes spoke against crime and the "no snitching" culture in the city, saying "We have to take back our streets. We have to start saying something. We cannot keep turning a blind eye to what's going on."

In their 2024 book Confronting Failures of Justice, Paul H. Robinson, Jeffrey Seaman, and Muhammad Sarahne criticized the lack of news coverage on Holley's murder, claiming that while "In 2021, a police officer was about four hundred times more likely to be killed by a Black civilian than an unarmed Black civilian was to be killed by a police officer", major news outlets such as The New York Times failed to report on Holley's murder while reporting on multiple killings by police officers.

=== Trials ===
Shaw was charged with first-degree murder, conspiracy to commit murder, and firearm offenses in both murders. He was convicted on all counts in Johnson's killing in October 2023, pleading guilty on all counts in Holley's killing on March 28, 2024. He was sentenced to life in prison plus 20 years without the possibility of parole the same day.

Kurt Bjorklund, an assistant State's Attorney, claimed that Holley was killed in a hit and that Knox initially lied because he knew he had been caught. He also cited the fact that three of Johnson's gunshot wounds were on each side of his back as supporting both Knox and Shaw's involvement. He also said that Knox would be liable regardless of if he shot due to a clause in Maryland law in which a person can be convicted for a crime that they did not directly commit if it could be proven that they "aided, counseled, commanded or encouraged" a crime to happen or if they voiced their intent to give support to the criminal. Natalie Finegar, Knox's attorney, said to jurors that Knox's story that Shaw performed the murders could not be disproven by the prosecution and that he may be telling the truth, however, he was still guilty of illegal possession of a firearm and being an accessory to murder, a crime he was not charged with. She countered Bjorklund's claim that the murder was a hit, saying that Knox was not a hitman, but "a person who got caught up in a very bad situation and made some very bad decisions".

[Knox] committed a senseless and heinous act against a Baltimore Police Department officer, and it is my hope that this verdict brings a sense of closure and peace to Officer Keona Holley’s family, friends, co-workers and loved ones.

— Richard Worley, commissioner of the Baltimore Police Department

On March 6, 2024, following almost two days of deliberation, Knox was found guilty on eight of nine counts, including two counts of first-degree murder and conspiracy to commit murder. However, he was acquitted of using a firearm to kill Holley. The verdict was celebrated by Ivan Bates, Mosby's replacement as state's attorney of Baltimore, as well as police officials, such as Richard Worley, Harrison's replacement as commissioner of the Baltimore Police Department, and Mike Mancuso, the president of the Baltimore Fraternal Order of Police. Knox was sentenced to two back-to-back life sentences without the possibility of parole on June 4.
