= Serpa (surname) =

Serpa is a surname. Notable people with the surname include:

- Adhemar Serpa (1898–1978), Brazilian water polo player
- Enrique Serpa (1900–1968), Cuban writer
- Horacio Serpa (1943–2020), Colombian lawyer and politician
- Innocentius Serpa (1573–1625), Italian Roman Catholic bishop
- Ivan Serpa (1923–1973), Brazilian painter, draftsman, printmaker, designer and educator
- Jorge Enrique Serpa Pérez (1942–2026), Cuban Roman Catholic bishop
- José Serpa (born 1979), Colombian road racing cyclist
- Louise Serpa (1925–2012), American rodeo photographer
- Marcello Serpa (born 1963), Brazilian advertising executive
- Patricia Serpa (born 1948), American politician
- Ronal W. Serpas (born c. 1961), American police chief
- Vasco Serpa (born 1971), Portuguese sport sailer

== See also ==
- Serpas
