= Lion of Saint Mark (disambiguation) =

The Lion of Saint Mark is a symbol of Mark the Evangelist.

It may also refer to:

- Lion of Venice, an ancient bronze statue
- Lion of Saint Mark (political party), the Venetian nationalist party
- Lion of St. Mark (award), an advertising award
- The Lion of St. Mark (film), 1963 Italian film
