= George Floyd protests in Maryland =

2020 civil unrest after the murder of George Floyd

- Part of George Floyd protests
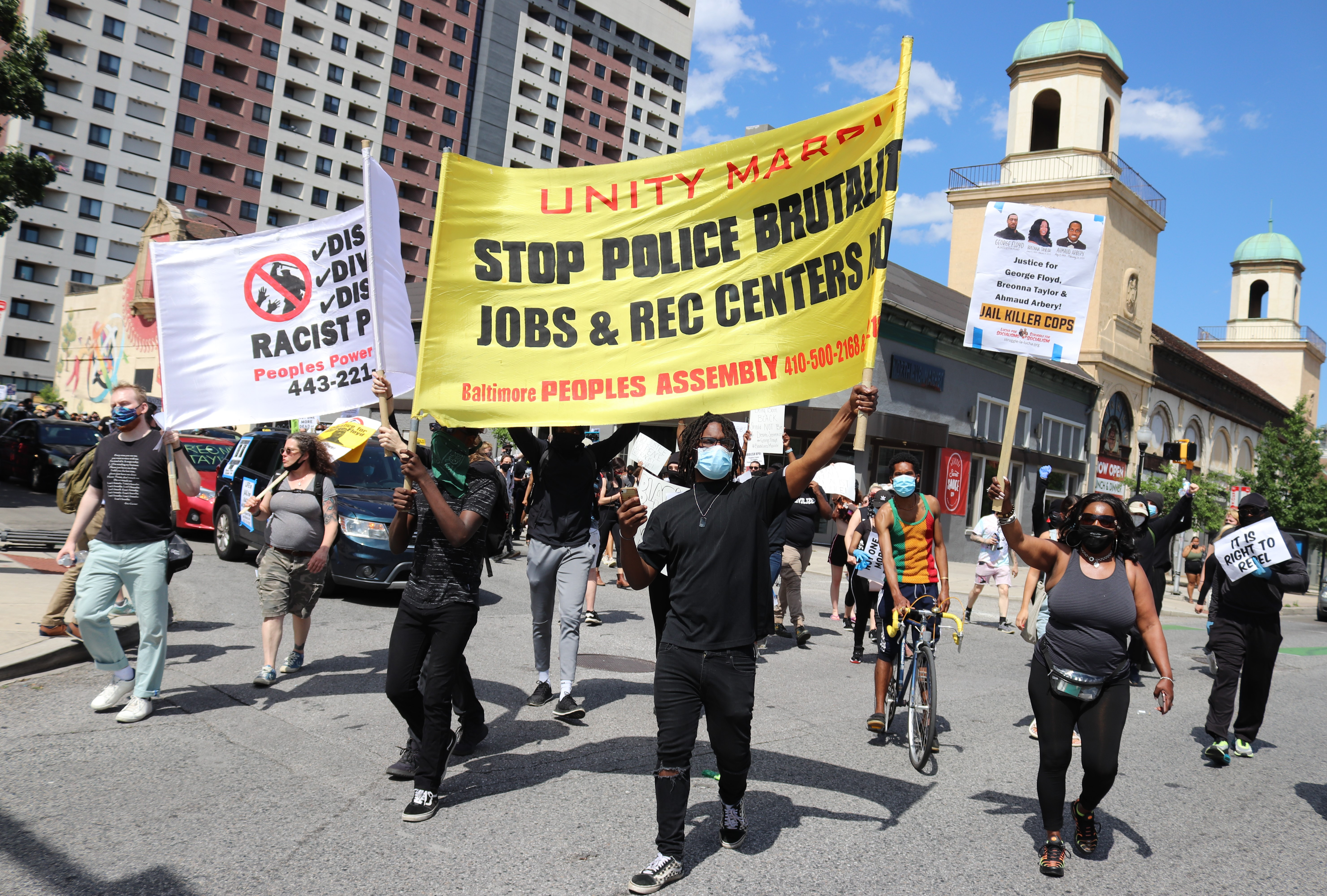
- Protest in Baltimore on May 30 2020
- Date: May 28 – June 13, 2020 (2 weeks and 2 days)
- Location: Maryland, United States
- Caused by: Police brutality; Institutional racism against African Americans; Reaction to the murder of George Floyd; Economic, racial and social inequality

Cities in Maryland in which a protest with about 100 or more participants was held

This is a list of protests related to the murder of George Floyd that took place in Maryland, United States.

== Background ==
On May 29, 2020, Maryland Governor Larry Hogan stated thought it was a tragic situation but that it is not "a fair comparison" to the death of Freddie Gray. Hogan also said that Donald Trump's "inflammatory rhetoric isn't going to help." Marilyn Mosby defended her decision to charge officers in the Gray case after a quick investigation, despite criticism from Michael O. Freeman, the County attorney of Hennepin County, Minnesota.

Baltimore City Police Commissioner, Michael S. Harrison expressed his disgust and heartbreak over the murder of George Floyd. Anne Arundel County Police Chief, Timothy J. Altomare echoed Harrison's statement in a press conference.

== Locations ==
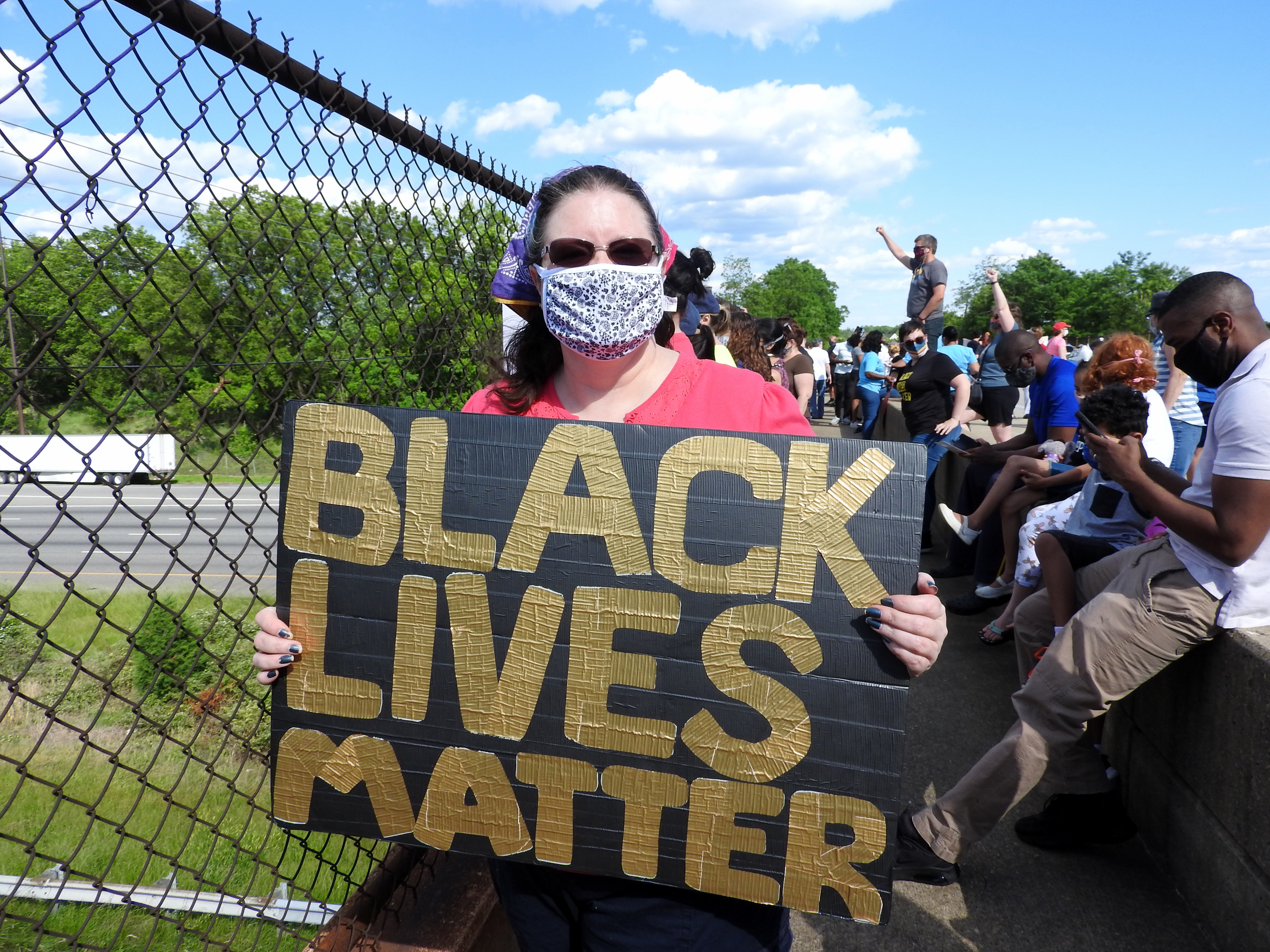
Protest in Howard County, Maryland on May 31

=== Annapolis ===
On May 30, over 100 protesters held a rally and march through Main Street in Annapolis. On June 5, approximately 200 people protested at the Alex Haley Memorial outside the Annapolis Market House chanting the names of Floyd and other black Americans killed by police violence.

On June 9, around 200 protesters commemorated Floyd's funeral by marching to the Maryland State House and holding a moment of silence for eight minutes and forty-six seconds.

=== Baltimore ===
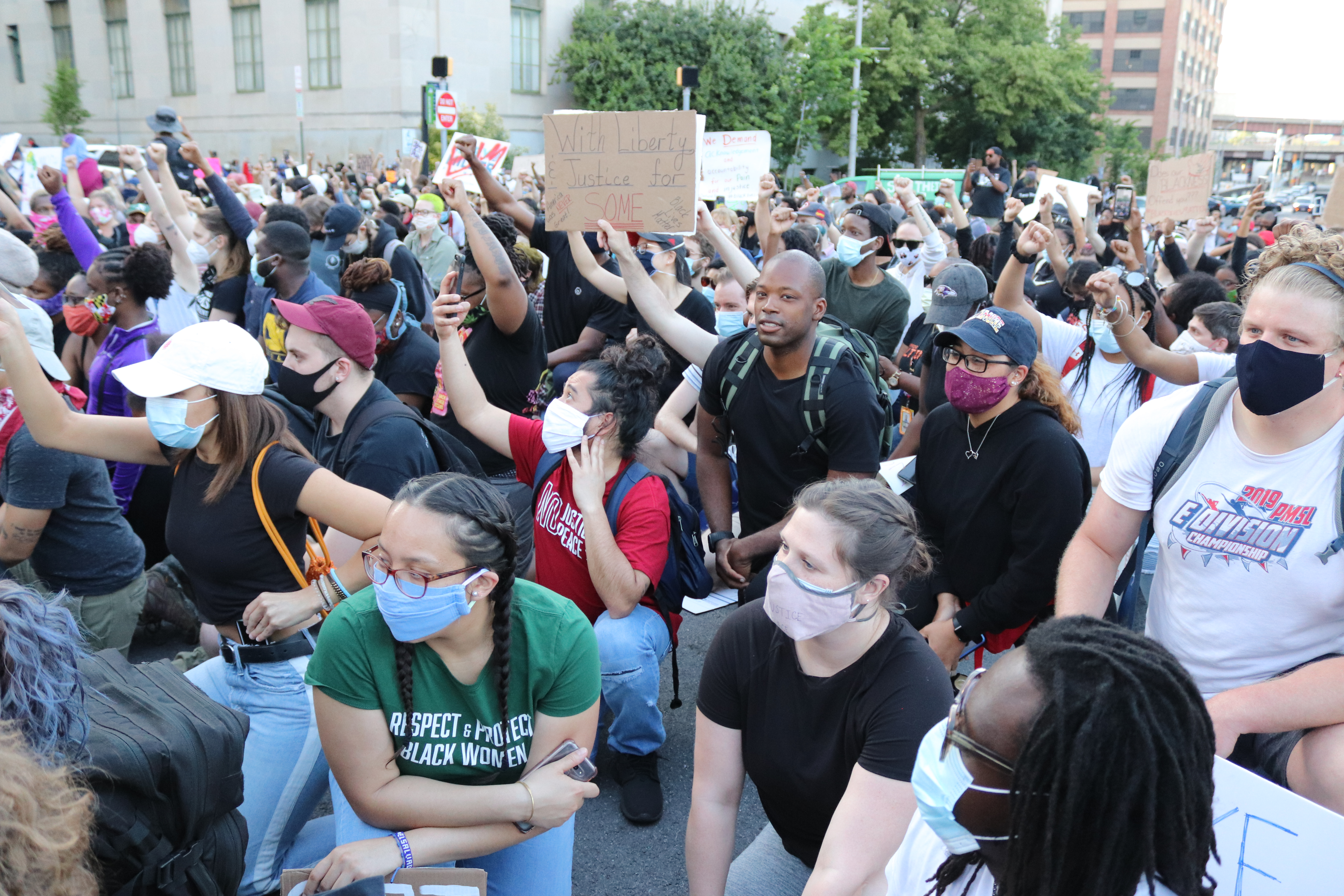
Protest at Baltimore City Hall on June 1. Protesters taking a knee and raising their fist to fight against police brutality

On May 29, protesters at the Inner Harbor in Baltimore blocked traffic on Light Street near 7:00 pm. The demonstration continued to Baltimore City Hall. On May 30, hundreds of protesters gathered outside Baltimore City Hall on Saturday night, for the second night. Protesters were mainly peaceful, with some reports of arrests and a police car window smashed. A car caravan protest also occurred.

On June 1, thousands of youth-led protesters marched peacefully from the Baltimore Convention Center to Baltimore City Hall, shutting down I-83 and passing by the Baltimore City Detention Center and the Baltimore City Correctional Center. Fourteen arrests were made as eight instances of destruction of property were reported.

On June 10, hundreds of protesters marched the streets to the Baltimore City Schools headquarters, where a moment of silence was held for eight minutes and forty-six seconds before organizers gave speeches.

On June 12, protesters gathered at City Hall as City Council members were scheduled to discuss the proposed half million police budget. Street artists painted in big pink letters "Defund the Police" on Gay Street.

=== Bel Air ===
On June 4, hundreds of protesters marched down Main Street in Bel Air to protest the murder of George Floyd. Harford County Sheriff Jeff Gahler initially declined to speak, but later released a statement proclaiming that racism is "inexcusable" and that law enforcement has "no place for this type of behavior."

=== Bethesda ===
On June 1, teens were hanging racial justice posters in Bethesda when they were accosted by a bicyclist, later identified as Anthony Brennan III by the Maryland-National Capital Park Police. In footage of the encounter, the man is seen to grapple with a girl over her posters and to use his bicycle as a weapon to ram the person filming the encounter. Park Police had requested the help of the public in identifying the unknown assailant. The suspect was arrested and charged with three counts of second-degree assault.

On June 2, students from Walt Whitman High School organized a rally of hundreds through downtown Bethesda to protest the murder of George Floyd.

=== Bowie ===
On June 6, a vigil was held in honor of George Floyd, Breonna Taylor, and Ahmaud Arbery in Allen Pond Park. During prayer, hundreds of protesters marched into the park where they joined the vigil participants in a moment of silence for eight minutes and forty-six seconds.

=== Columbia ===
On June 2, thousands of protesters peacefully marched from The Mall in Columbia through downtown Columbia in the late afternoon, holding a vigil and reading off the names of victims of police brutality. Calvin Ball III, the Executive of Howard County, was among the protesters.

=== Frederick ===
On June 2, protesters held a peaceful march in downtown Frederick. On June 5, a crowd of over 1,000 protesters peacefully demonstrated in downtown Frederick and held a march ending at Bakers Park. Later in the evening, the protesters shut down parts of Route 80 and Route 75.

=== Germantown ===
On May 31, over 100 peaceful protesters marched on the streets of Germantown. Montgomery County police facilitated the protest with some officers taking a knee in solidarity.

=== Gaithersburg ===
On June 1, hundreds of protesters, mostly teens and young adults, marched from the Rio Lakefront shopping center to Sam Eig and Great Seneca Highways, blocking traffic in the process. The protest remained peaceful.

=== Hagerstown ===
About 100 people gathered in downtown Hagerstown on May 31 to protest the murder of George Floyd. On June 7, another protest with more than 100 protesters marched past The Maryland Theater holding signs and chanting before gathering for speakers at Fairgrounds Park.

=== Kensington ===
A few hundred people gathered at the intersection of Beach Dr. and Cedar Ln. on June 6, 2020. The march proceeded to Ken-Gar First Baptist Church, where residents of Kensington met residents of Ken-Gar. Protesters stopped at Ken-Gar First Baptist Church to hear the pastor speak. The march then continued to Kensington Town Hall, where Rev. Dr. Pat Allen spoke, as well as local leaders and students.

=== Leisure World ===
On June 2, dozens of Leisure World residents protested along Georgia Avenue while practicing social distancing.

=== Ocean City ===
On June 6, several hundred people protested on the Ocean City Boardwalk.

=== Pocomoke City ===
On June 3, protesters marched alongside police officers from the Pocomoke City Police Department in Pocomoke City. Demonstrators marched from the Pocomoke City Police Department to Cypress Park, where a prayer and vigil honoring George Floyd was held.

=== Rockville ===
On June 5, hundreds of peaceful protesters gathered outside of the Montgomery County Judicial Center to demand justice for George Floyd.

=== Salisbury ===
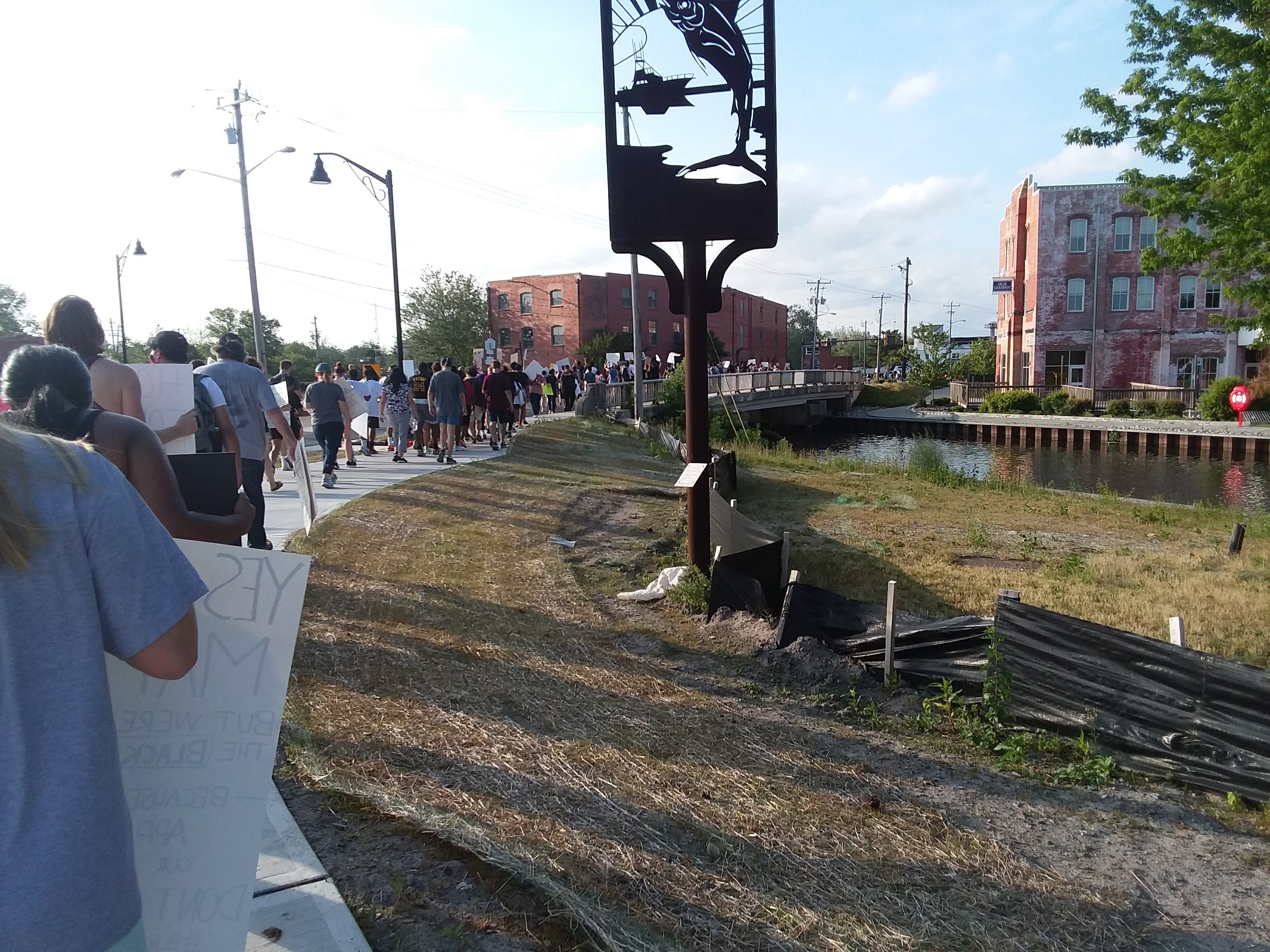
Protesters march across the Mill Street Bridge in Salisbury on June 10.

On June 4, dozens of protesters held a peaceful demonstration in downtown Salisbury to protest the murder of George Floyd, joined by police and city officials.

On June 10, over 100 protesters walked from Salisbury University to the Salisbury Police Department, protesting racism in policing.

=== Towson ===
On May 30, between 125 and 150 protesters, including founder of the Maryland Lynching Memorial Project, fanned out around the Towson Government Center.

On June 4, protesters held BLM signs at Towson Traffic Circle.

On June 13, more protests occurred on the campus of Towson University.
