= Serpas =

Serpas is a surname. Notable people with the surname include:

- Edgardo Antonio Serpas (born 1974), Salvadoran sprinter
- Lilian Serpas (1905–1985), Salvadoran poet
- Martha Serpas, American poet
- Ronal W. Serpas (born c. 1961), American university professor

== See also ==
- Serpa (surname)
