= 2023 Baltimore shooting =

Mass shooting in Maryland, U.S.

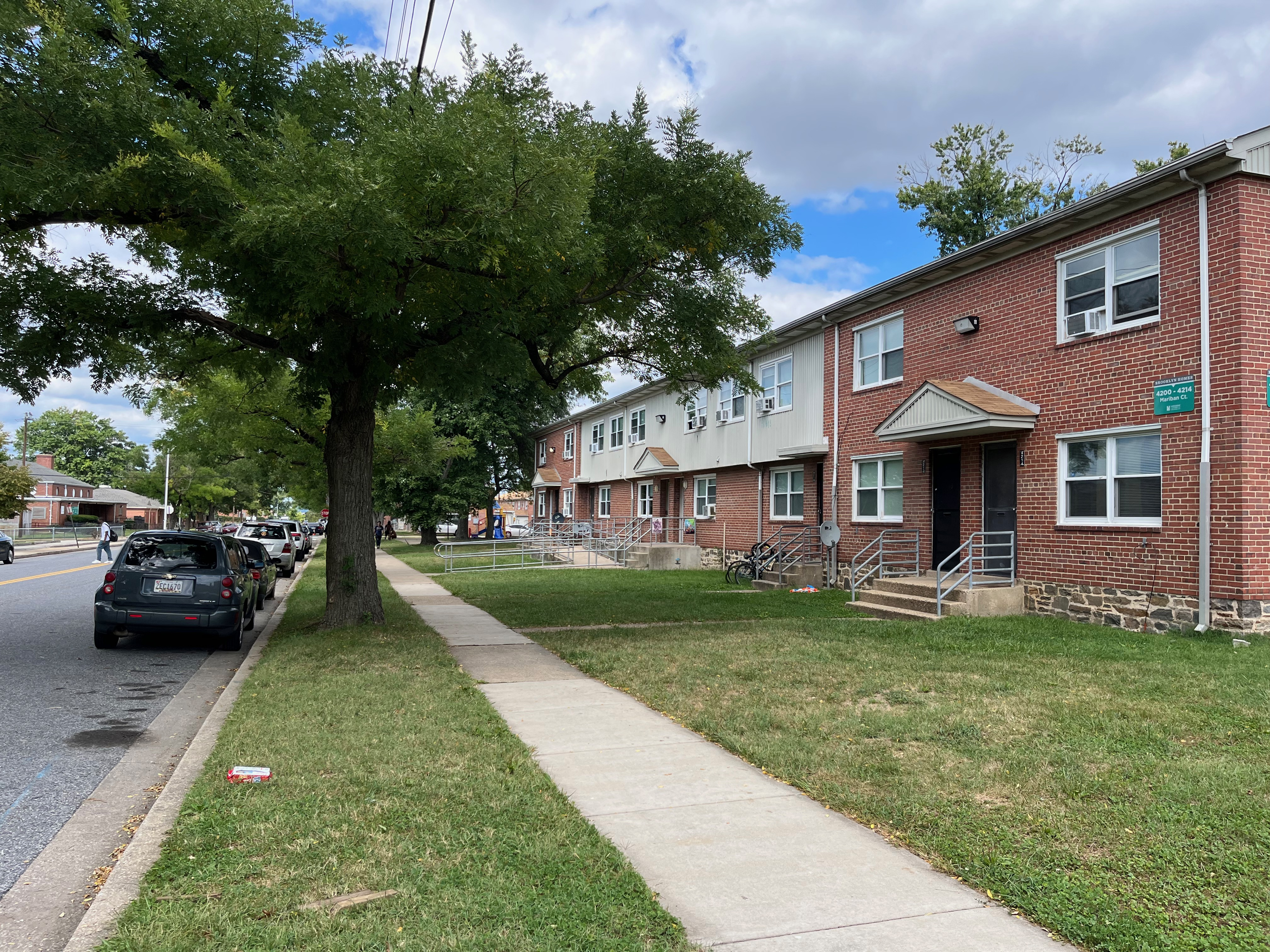
- Brooklyn Homes townhouses, pictured in 2022
- Location: 39.2302°N 76.6005°W; Brooklyn, Baltimore, Maryland, U.S.
- Date: July 2, 2023; 3 years ago 12:35 a.m. (EDT)
- Attack type: Mass shooting
- Weapon: Glock 17 (9mm)
- Deaths: 2
- Injuries: 28
- Convicted: Aaron Brown; Tristan Brian Jackson; 3 unnamed minors

On July 2, 2023, a mass shooting occurred in the Brooklyn neighborhood of Baltimore, Maryland, United States, during a Brooklyn Day celebration. Two people were killed and 28 were injured according to police. It is the largest shooting incident in the city's history.

== Incident ==
The incident occurred in the Brooklyn Homes area located in the southern part of Baltimore at around 12:35 a.m. EDT. According to charging documents obtained by the media, initial gunshots from one weapon led to other people in the area to begin shooting over a span of 10 minutes. The gathering was organized for an event called "Brooklyn Day", an annual event that was attended by over 700 partygoers, located at a housing development in the 800 block of Gretna Court. Multiple videos of the event appeared on social media sites such as Instagram, including one that showed partygoers evacuating after the shooting and another showing a 17-year-old pulling a gun out of a backpack who was later arrested and charged with three counts of weapons-related violations, reckless endangerment, and two charges of inciting a riot. Police officers rushed to the scene after numerous 9-1-1 calls, where they found multiple gunshot victims. Multiple sources reported that about 20 to 30 gunshots were fired.

Residents told the media that there was no police presence at the event, which officials said was because event organizers did not give the city a three-day notice to provide resources to staff it, unlike previous years. Police radio communications from southern Baltimore indicated that the police were aware of the event, with officers asking the department's Foxtrot helicopter to fly overhead. According to city logs, the Baltimore Police Department began receiving calls about armed persons and noise complaints at 5:30 p.m. EDT. Dispatch audio indicated that police received another call around 9:45 p.m. reporting "hundreds of males and females armed with guns and knives" at the event, and more calls about fighting, loud noise, and potential shooting were received before 11 p.m., which prompted police to fly a helicopter over the event before dismissing the situation.

Safe Streets outreach workers were deployed at the event at 9 p.m. and had deescalated five fights, none of which involved weapons, but were not present during the time of the shooting due to workers' shifts ending at 11 p.m. Safe Streets workers also did not inform police of their activities as they are trained not to involve law enforcement in their interventions to maintain community credibility.

== Victims ==
According to police reports, two people were killed and an additional 28 sustained injuries. One victim died at the scene and another at a local hospital; they were later identified as Aaliyah Gonzalez and Kylis Fagbemi. Gonzalez had been shot in the head.

Nine victims were transported to the hospital by ambulance, while 20 victims transported themselves to area hospitals. The ages of the victims ranged from 13 to 32, with 15 of the victims being under 18 years old. The University of Maryland Medical Center took in 12 victims at its Shock Trauma Center and four were treated at its pediatric emergency department, while MedStar Harbor Hospital treated 19 patients.

In November 2023, the families of shooting victims, including those of Fagbemi and Gonzalez, said they were planning to sue the city and state over the incident, seeking a combined $150 million in damages. The families will be represented in the lawsuit by civil rights attorney Billy Murphy Jr.

== Aftermath ==
Vigils were held in the Brooklyn community following the shooting. The Mayor's Office of Neighborhood Safety and Engagement (MONSE) deployed its Peace Mobile to distribute household items and resources to Brooklyn residents at the Brooklyn Homes community center and through social workers and local charities. The Baltimore Police Department had "enhanced deployment" in some areas of Baltimore during July 4 celebrations in the city, including at the Cherry Hill Festival.

Within the year following the shooting, MONSE documented 2,000 interactions with neighborhood residents in the year following the shooting, provided relocation assistance to 23 Brooklyn Homes residents, and referred 19 others to the Baltimore State's Attorney's Office for help. Multiple other residents, including Kylis Fagbemi's mother, moved away from the community, citing trauma from the shooting. The Housing Authority hired private security to patrol the neighborhood and the Baltimore Police Department increased policing in the area following the shooting, which may have contributed to the community seeing the largest decrease in violent crimes year-over-year out of any Baltimore neighborhood. In November 2024, city officials held a press conference to celebrate achieving over a year without a homicide within the Brooklyn neighborhood.

In July 2026, the families of Aaliyah Gonzalez and Kylis Fagbemi filed lawsuits against the Housing Authority of Baltimore City, alleging the agency had a duty to provide security that could have prevented the shooting.

== Investigation ==
Acting Baltimore Police Commissioner Richard Worley confirmed that there were "at least three" people who fired at the scene and that more than three firearms were used in the shooting, with casings from more than a dozen guns being found by investigators at the crime scene, including six fired from a rifle-caliber pistol, although it was unclear if every gun is tied to the mass shooting. The Baltimore Police Department offered a $28,000 reward for information on the suspects.

During its investigation, the Baltimore Police Department had seized the personal belongings of several of the shooting victims while they underwent surgery, despite promises from the department to "minimize or eliminate" the confiscation of crime victims' property. A spokesperson for the department said it would hold the "evidentiary property" until the conclusion of a criminal case, and added that the department had already returned some seized items. Police also threw out substantial amounts of trash from the site of the shooting, which was criticized by forensic experts who claimed that the trash collection would result in the destruction of DNA evidence that could lead to arrests. The police's after-action report justified the removal of trash from the site, saying that the debris was hindering evidence collection.

According to the Baltimore Banner, a 45-foot elm tree blocked the view of the only static camera overlooking the mass shooting site, which likely blocked police from key footage that could have been used to identify shooting suspects. The tree blocking the camera was removed the day after the shooting.

As of April 2025, the investigation into potential perpetrators is still ongoing.

== Perpetrators ==
According to police, at least 10 different shooters could have been involved in the Brooklyn Day shooting. Police made five arrests in connection with the shooting, including four alleged shooters. Prosecutors sought to try all five arrested individuals in a single trial, however, Baltimore City circuit court judge Jeffrey M. Geller ruled in March 2024 that three separate trials should be held.

On August 17, 2023, the Baltimore Police Department arrested 18-year-old Tristan Brian Jackson (born April 19, 2005) of Baltimore on attempted murder charges in connection with the Brooklyn Homes shooting. On August 31, police arrested 18-year-old Aaron Brown on numerous assault, gun, and attempted murder charges, and a minor, in connection to the shooting. Jackson and Brown were set to stand trial together, but Brown pleaded guilty to conspiracy to commit first-degree murder charges in May 2024 and was sentenced to 60 years in prison, with 48 years suspended, plus five years' probation. Jackson initially rejected multiple plea offers from prosecutors, but eventually accepted a plea deal sentencing him to five to twelve years in prison in March 2025.

On September 13, police arrested a 15-year-old boy on 44 charges, including attempted first-degree murder and second-degree murder, in connection to the shooting. According to investigators, he allegedly fired a weapon at several people during the Brooklyn Day party. He was tried alongside a 14-year-old who was arrested on attempted murder and conspiracy to commit murder charges. Both teenagers pleaded guilty to first-degree assault and illegal handgun possession charges in May 2024, and were sentenced to 25 years incarceration with all but five years suspended.

A 17-year-old who was accused of pulling a gun out of a bag before the Brooklyn Day shooting was tried as an adult and separately from the other accused defendants. He pleaded guilty to the riot and firearms offenses in May 2024, and was sentenced to one year in prison.

== Responses ==
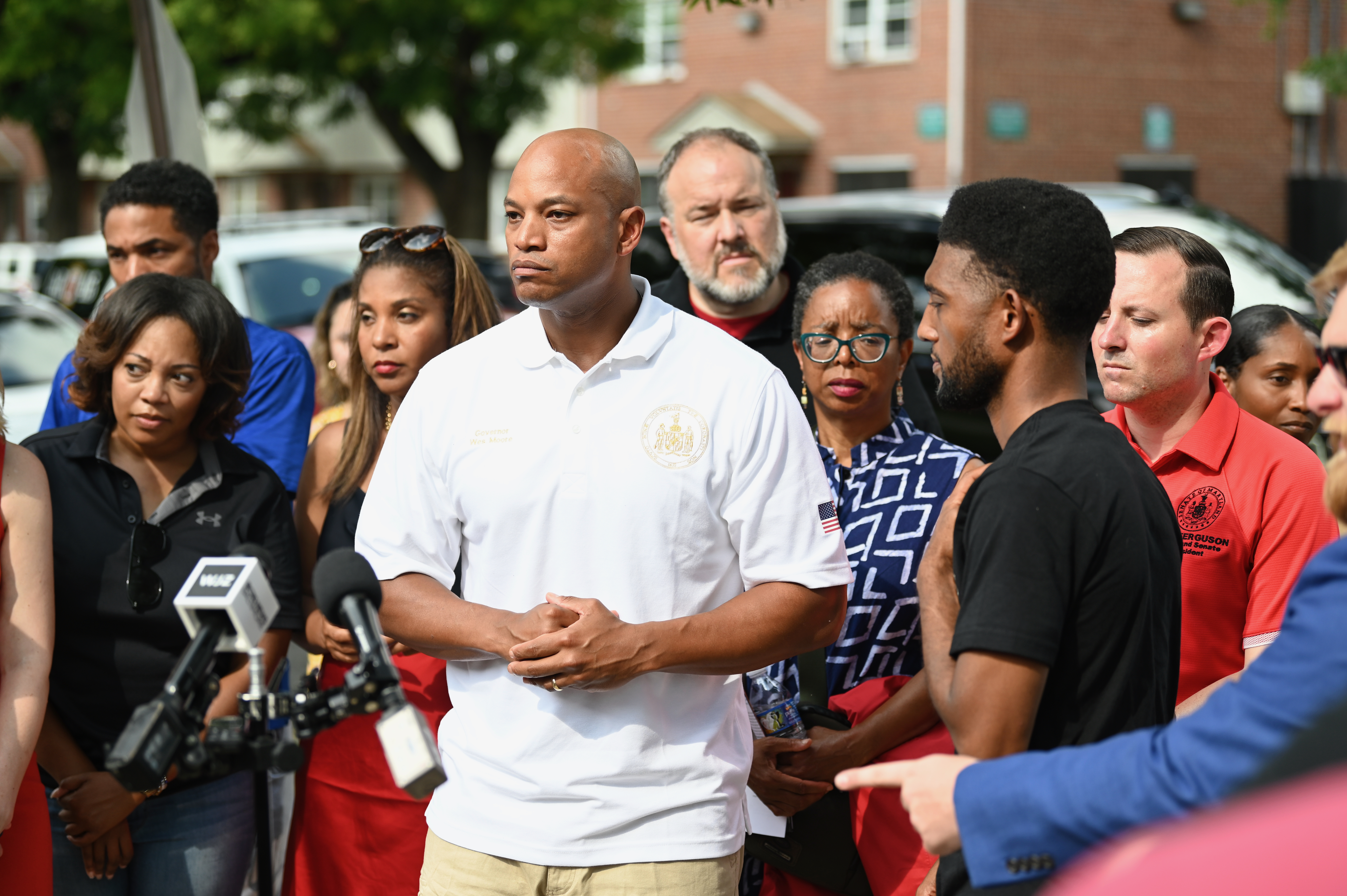
Maryland Governor Wes Moore and other Baltimore leaders visit the Brooklyn Community Center, 2023

In the morning following the shooting, Maryland Governor Wes Moore and several other Baltimore leaders released statements expressing their condolences. Baltimore Mayor Brandon Scott also called for further crackdowns on illegal guns coming in from other states and criticized people who uploaded videos of the incident to social media for not intervening. United States President Joe Biden also expressed condolences and called for gun control. Republican Party leaders of the Maryland General Assembly called for Moore to convene a special session to pass legislation to address gun violence, which Moore said was not needed. Moore met with Brooklyn community leaders and people injured by the shooting on July 4, and later spoke at the Cherry Hill Festival to support gun violence prevention efforts in the city.

The Baltimore Fraternal Order of Police released a statement on Twitter calling on Scott to implement a "retention and recruitment plan" for hiring more police in the city, pointing out that there were only seven officers patrolling the area at the time of the shooting. Officials stated before the shooting that the department had 338 patrol vacancies and had funding to hire an additional 918 patrol positions. Worley also disputed the staffing claims made by the police union, saying that there were more than seven police in the Southern District at the time. Baltimore City Councilor Phylicia Porter, whose district includes Brooklyn, called the lack of police an "immense systemic failure" and said that the multiple city agencies, including the police and Housing Authority, should have known to deploy more police ahead of the event. Scott defended the role of the police as well as the city's Safe Streets gun violence program, saying the focus should "instead be on a few people who cowardly decided to shoot up a big block party celebration for a community". Worley blamed the lack of police for the event being "unpermitted" and later said that decisions on whether to send more officers to the neighborhood for the festival happened "too late". He also added that departmental staffing was not an issue for its response, or lack thereof. In June 2024, following a year-long investigation, the Baltimore Police Department terminated two employees—a sworn law enforcement officer and a civilian employee—and disciplined several others on charges of making false statements, neglect of duty, conduct unbecoming, and body-worn camera violations in connection with the police response to the Brooklyn Day shooting.

The Baltimore City Council held a hearing on the response from multiple agencies—including the Baltimore Police Department, Housing Authority, Department of Transportation, and MONSE—to the shooting on July 13. At the hearing, Worley and other leaders of the Baltimore Police Department acknowledged department-wide failures, including a "catastrophic breakdown" in judgement and communications, and admitted responsibility for the lack of police presence at the party. He also said that there was an ongoing investigation into where police were patrolling that night, which included a review of police body camera footage, dispatch recordings, and GPS locations. Baltimore Police patrol chief Kevin Jones, in response to criticism about the police's relationship with the community, said that investigators had received 30 tips with information about the mass shooting. Janet Abrahams, the CEO of the city Housing Authority, said that staff did not see flyers for the party that were circulating in the neighborhood and that officials would be expanding its contracted security force to additional properties, including Brooklyn Homes. Abrahams also said that officials were exploring evictions for tenants who organized the party without notifying the Housing Authority in advance, which violated the terms of their residency agreements. MONSE interim executive director Stefanie Mavronis defended the city's youth curfew and the role of Safe Streets and its workers leading up to the shooting, pointing to the successes made through the agency's de-escalation strategy in parts of Baltimore, but said that she had not yet reviewed workers' logs about their efforts in the Brooklyn Homes area the night of the shooting. A few days after the hearing, the Housing Authority said it would revise its policies toward event authorization, including requiring residents to get written approval from the agency to use any indoor or outdoor common areas in events.

On August 30, 2023, the Baltimore Police Department released its 173-page "after-action report", which faulted police supervisors for taking a "hands-off approach" to intervening in the Brooklyn Day celebration, even as 9-1-1 calls increased, and police officers for showing "little to no concern for public safety" and gathering no meaningful intelligence ahead of the party. The report also recommended a series of leadership changes within the Baltimore Police Department. Following the report, some command-level supervisors were reassigned and disciplinary actions were taken against others.

External videos
- Grieving mother brings Brooklyn Day hearing to a halt in stirring testimony | Krystal Gonzalez via YouTube

The Baltimore City Council held a second hearing on the Brooklyn Day shooting on September 13, 2023, following the release of the after-action report. During the hearing, several city councilors expressed dissatisfaction with the recommendations in the audit report. Krystal Gonzalez, the mother of shooting victim Aaliyah Gonzales, spoke at the council hearing recounting her daughter's death and strongly criticizing the police response to the shooting. Her emotional testimony led City Councilor Mark Conway to abruptly postpone the remainder of the hearing to September 27, during which city councilors expressed support for stronger and increased enforcement of police protocols.

In October 2023, Safe Streets modified its escalation protocol to require staffers to share details about large community events with the city, especially if the events have the potential for "mass harm or destruction", so that MONSE officials can increase violence intervention resources and potentially police presence at future gatherings. Safe Streets workers do not need to report attendees suspected of illegally carrying a firearm at large events, as officials believe that doing so would hurt Safe Streets' "credibility and individual safety".

During the 2024 legislative session, Governor Moore introduced the ENOUGH Act, a bill to provide $15 million in grants toward underserved communities. Moore announced the bill in Brooklyn, which he said was a community that had gone "unseen", "unheard", and "underestimated". The bill passed the Maryland General Assembly and was signed into law by Moore on May 9, 2024.
