= Marcello Serpa =

Brazilian advertising executive (born 1962)

- Born: 1962 (age 63–64); Sao Paulo, Brazil
- Education: Fachhochschule fur Grafik-Design, Munich, Germany

Marcello Serpa is a Brazilian advertising executive. He was creative director and co-chairman of AlmapBBDO until 2015.

== Career ==
Serpa studied visual and graphic arts in Germany, where he subsequently worked for different ad agencies. In 1987 he returned to his native Brazil, where in 1993 he took the lead of AlmapBBDO together with strategic planner José Luiz Madeira. After two decades at the helm of the agency, the pair left Almap in 2015.

== Awards ==
Serpa is Brazil’s most honoured art director, with 45 Clio Awards, and 149 Cannes Festival Lions, including Latin America’s first Grand Prix.

In 1993, he won Latin America’s first Grand Prix award in Cannes, in print and outdoor, for a campaign he created for Guaraná Antarctica soft drink while at DM9 DDB, a São Paulo agency.

Serpa is also a winner of the 2008 Clio Awards Lifetime Achievement Award, and a Lion of St. Mark award.
