= Richard Worley (police officer) =

Commissioner of the Baltimore Police Department since 2023

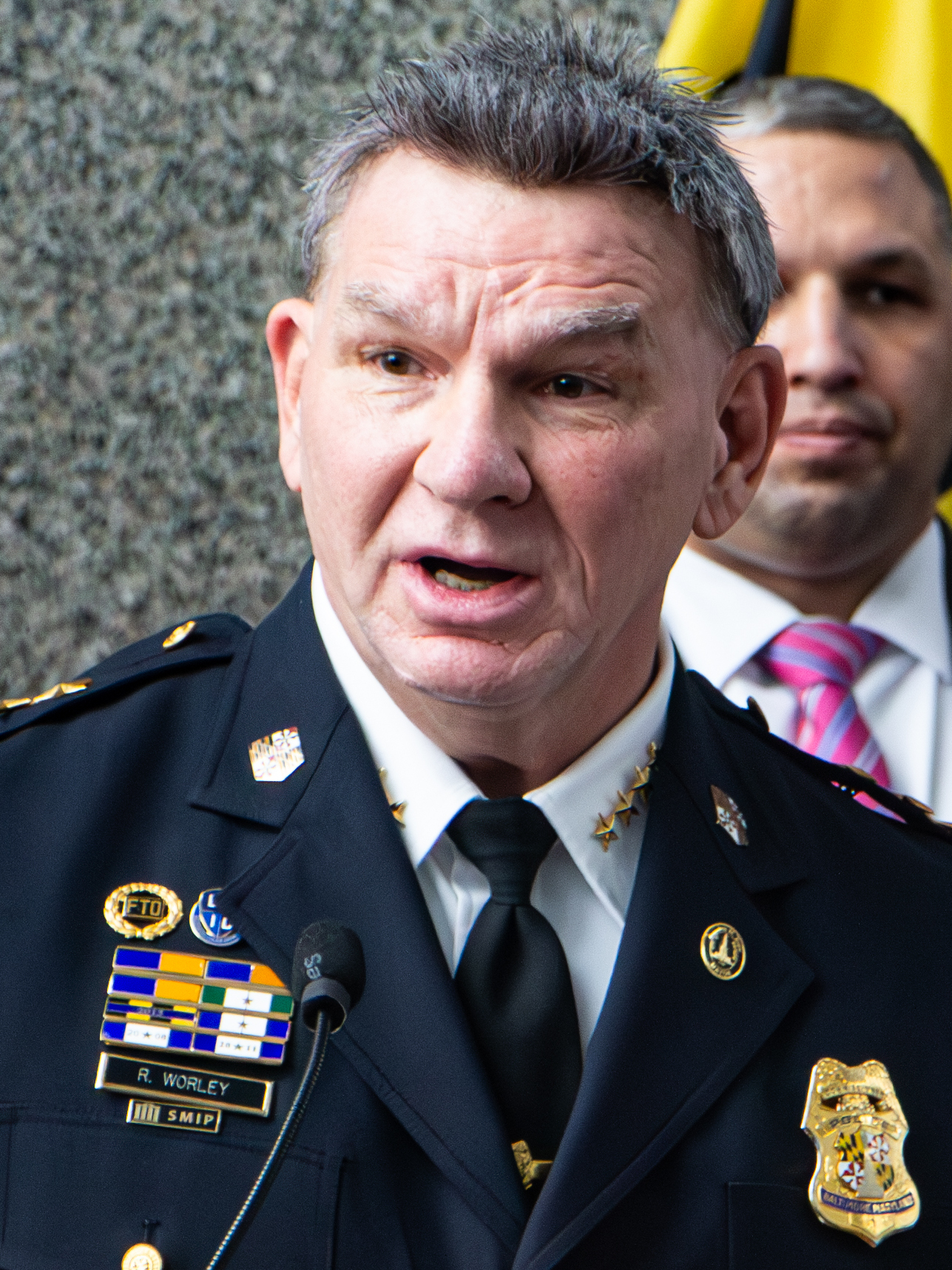
- Worley in 2024

Commissioner of the Baltimore Police Department
- Incumbent
- Assumed office June 9, 2023^{[a]}
- Preceded by: Michael S. Harrison

Deputy Commissioner of Operations of the Baltimore Police Department
- In office September 2022 – June 9, 2023
- Commissioner: Michael S. Harrison

Personal details
- Born: Richard J. Worley Jr. 1964 or 1965 (age 61–62) Baltimore, Maryland
- Children: 2
- Education: Oklahoma City University
- Salary: US$320,000
- Police career
- Department: Baltimore Police Department
- Service years: 1998–present
- Rank: Lieutenant; Major; Lieutenant colonel; Colonel
- a. Acting until October 2, 2023

Richard J. Worley Jr. (born 1964 or 1965) is an American police officer who has served as the commissioner of the Baltimore Police Department since 2023. Born in Baltimore's Pigtown community, he graduated from Cardinal Gibbons School in 1983 and earned a degree in criminal justice from Oklahoma City University in 1987.

Worley began his law enforcement career in 1998 with the Baltimore Police Department, working his way up from a trainee to positions such as lieutenant, major, lieutenant colonel, and ultimately, police colonel. He played a role in implementing the city's deployment plans for protests related to the murder of George Floyd in 2021. In September 2022, Worley became the deputy commissioner of the Baltimore Police Department under Michael S. Harrison and assumed the role of acting commissioner on June 9, 2023, following his predecessor's resignation. Despite some controversy surrounding his nomination, he was confirmed as commissioner by the Baltimore City Council on October 2, 2023, with one dissenting vote.

== Early life and career ==
Richard J. Worley Jr. was born in the Pigtown community of Baltimore around 1964 or 1965. He graduated from Cardinal Gibbons School in 1983 and obtained a degree in criminal justice from Oklahoma City University in 1987. He was actively involved in college baseball and was notably recognized by his coach as "the natural." After college, he briefly played in minor league baseball and later worked in his family's flooring business for a decade.

== Police career ==
Worley began his police career with the Baltimore Police Department as a trainee in 1998 at the age of 34. He initially served four years on patrol in the Western District before progressing through the ranks, holding positions such as a lieutenant, major, lieutenant colonel, and ultimately, police colonel. He served as the commander for four years of the Northeastern District, an area covering some of Baltimore's leafiest, quasi-suburban neighborhoods where he connected with residents through a regular newsletter. It's also where he got to know Brandon Scott, then a City Hall aide who later became city councilman and eventually mayor. In 2021, he played a role in implementing the city's deployment plans for protests related to the murder of George Floyd.

In September 2022, Worley assumed the position of deputy commissioner of operations for the Baltimore Police Department under Michael S. Harrison. When Harrison decided to resign after nearly five years in 2023, Scott phoned Worley at 11:30 on a June night and told him he would be named commissioner the following morning. He bypassed a search and soliciting community feedback; Scott says he knew what he was getting. “One of the reasons Rich and I have hit it off all these years, we’re not interested in the glitz and glamour. What matters to him is helping people, and doing the right thing,” Scott said in an interview. “I know he cares about public safety in Baltimore, and he’s going to work hard and get the job done.” On July 17, 2023, Mayor Brandon Scott officially nominated Worley for the position of commissioner. While the Baltimore NAACP called for the withdrawal of his nomination, Worley received endorsements from former Mayor Jack Young and State's Attorney Ivan Bates.

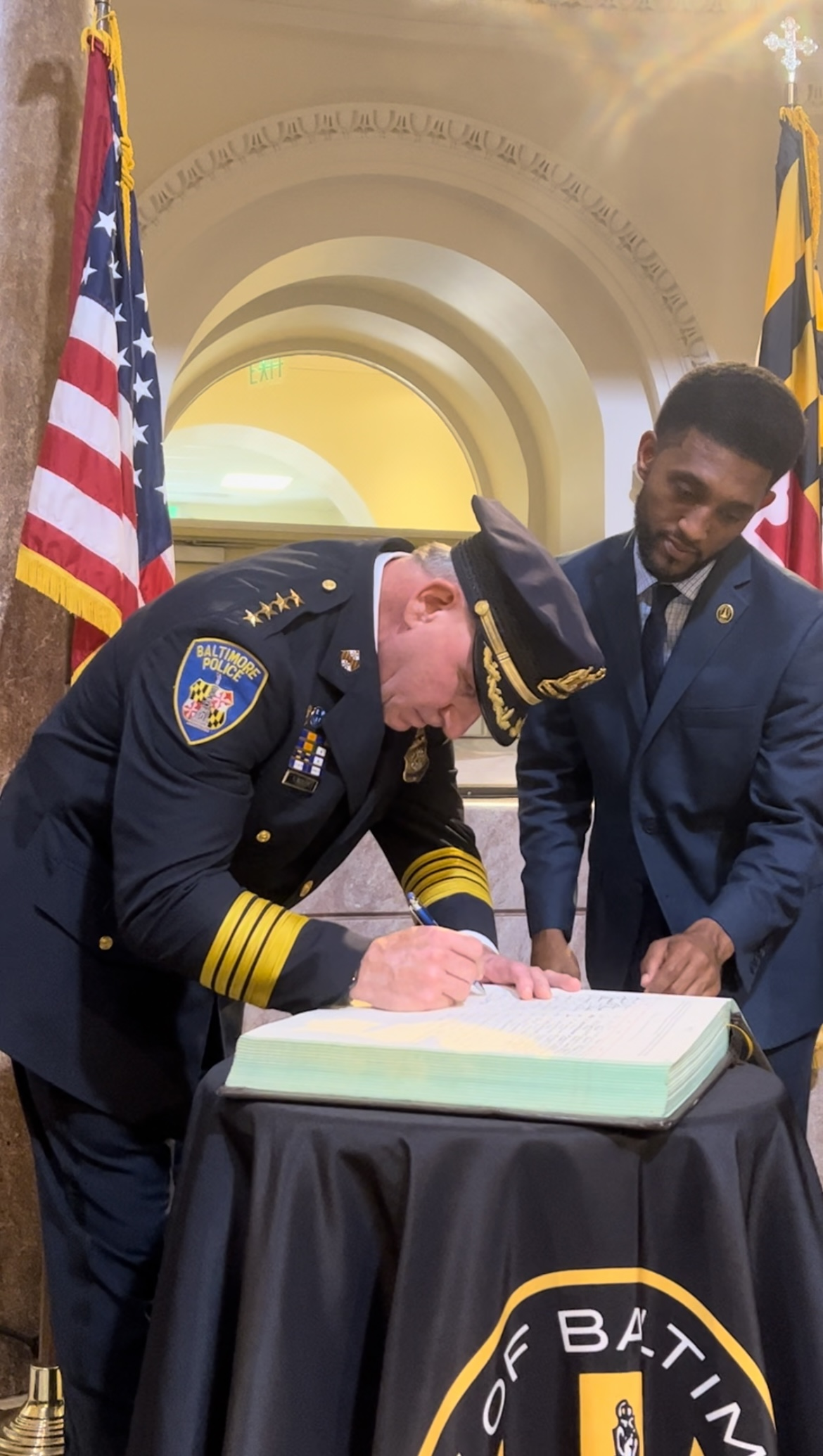
Worley being sworn in as commissioner. Mayor Brandon Scott is standing next to him.

Worley's nomination was unanimously approved by the Baltimore City Council Oversight Committee and later confirmed by the full Baltimore City Council on October 2, 2023, with the only dissenting vote coming from Councilwoman Phylicia Porter, who represents the district affected by the 2023 Baltimore shooting, which occurred during his tenure as acting commissioner. As acting commissioner, his salary was US$207,944, and upon his nomination's approval by the City Council, he received a three-year contract with an annual salary of US$285,000.

Under his leadership, Baltimore experienced significant reductions in crime during 2023 and 2024. In 2023, the city recorded fewer than 300 homicides for the first time in nearly a decade, marking a notable decrease from previous years. This downward trend continued into 2024, with a 36% drop in homicides and a 30% decrease in non-fatal shootings reported in the first half of the year compared to the same period in 2023. By the end of 2024, Baltimore had recorded 201 homicides, representing a 23% decrease from the previous year. Additionally, the number of ghost guns seized in Baltimore decreased by 24% in 2024 compared to 2023, continuing a downward trend since a peak in 2022. These improvements have been attributed to enhanced policing strategies, increased community engagement, and a focus on violent crime reduction under Commissioner Worley’s administration.

In the first half of 2025, Baltimore reported the lowest number of homicides in fifty years. The murder rate through July was the lowest since 1983, when William Donald Schaefer was mayor. The previously scandal-plagued department has also mostly avoided controversy. Today, the department has about 2,000 officers, a decline of 600 from a decade ago.

In 2025, Baltimore continued to report declines in violent crime. The city recorded 133 homicides during the year, representing a decrease of approximately 31 percent compared to 2024 and the lowest annual total in several decades. Nonfatal shootings also declined by approximately 25 percent year over year. Reported homicide clearance rates increased to approximately 65 percent. According to official reporting and statements from city officials, the continued decline was attributed to data-driven deployment strategies, expanded violence reduction initiatives, and targeted enforcement efforts.

On December 1, 2023, Worley, who had been living in Annapolis in neighboring Anne Arundel County, moved back to Baltimore, due to a clause in the city charter that requires the commissioner to live in the city or sign a declaration that they plan to move in the next six months after being appointed as commissioner. He signed the declaration on September 20, a day before his nomination was approved by the Oversight Committee. Worley lived out of a downtown hotel until the end of 2024, afterwards purchasing a new home in the Roland Park neighborhood.

== Personal life ==
Worley is married with two children. He is an avid baseball player and fan of the sport. In addition to his career in law enforcement, he has been a Major League Baseball merchandise authenticator since August 2014.

Police appointments
Preceded by Michael S. Harrison	Commissioner of the Baltimore Police Department; 2023–	Incumbent
