= Lion of St. Mark (award) =

Award given each year

The Lion of St. Mark is an award given each year at the Cannes Lions International Festival of Creativity for a lifetime of services to creativity in communications.

It was instituted in 2011. The trophy is modelled on the lion statue in St Mark's Square, Venice, where the first Cannes Lions festival was held in 1954.

== Winners ==
- 2011, Sir John Hegarty
- 2012, Dan Wieden
- 2013, Lee Clow
- 2014, Joe Pytka
- 2015, Bob Greenberg
- 2016, Marcello Serpa
- 2017, David Droga
- 2018, Piyush Pandey and Prasoon Pandey
- 2019, Rich Silverstein & Jeff Goodby
- 2020, Mary Wells Lawrence
