= Michael S. Harrison =

American police officer (born 1968 or 1969)

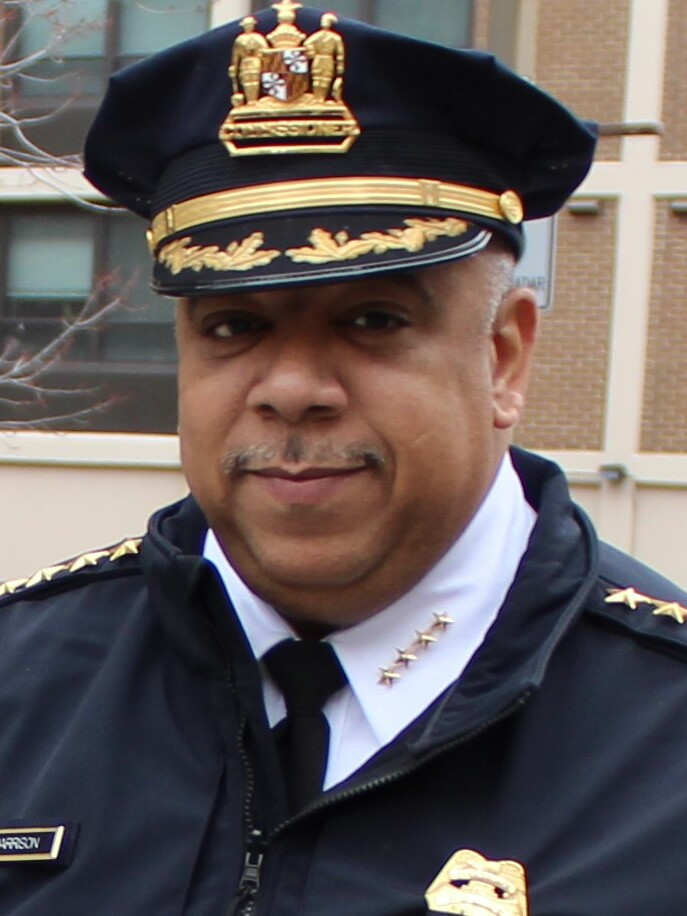
- Harrison in 2019

Commissioner of the Baltimore Police Department
- In office January 2019^{[a]} – June 8, 2023
- Preceded by: Gary Tuggle (acting)
- Succeeded by: Richard Worley

Superintendent of the New Orleans Police Department
- In office October 14, 2014 – January 18, 2019
- Preceded by: Ronal W. Serpas
- Succeeded by: Shaun Ferguson

Personal details
- Born: 1968 or 1969 (age 56–57)
- Children: 2
- Education: University of Phoenix; Loyola University New Orleans
- Police career
- Country: United States
- Department: New Orleans Police Department; Baltimore Police Department
- Service years: 1991–2023
- a. Acting until March 12, 2019

Michael S. Harrison (born 1968 or 1969) is an American former police officer who served as commissioner of the Baltimore Police Department (BPD) from 2019 to 2023. He was also the superintendent of the New Orleans Police Department (NOPD) from 2014 to 2019.

A graduate of the University of Phoenix and Loyola University New Orleans, Harrison joined the NOPD in 1991. He rose through the ranks of the department, ultimately becoming superintendent in August 2014, appointed by Mayor Mitch Landrieu to replace Ronal Serpas. During his time as superintendent, homicide and shooting rates fell, but theft significantly increased. He was reappointed as superintendent in May 2018. While he was recommended as a candidate for commissioner of the BPD, Harrison declined, wishing to remain with the NOPD. Despite this, Harrison ultimately agreed to join the BPD in January 2019 after leading candidate Joel Fitzgerald dropped out. Harrison officially became commissioner in March, a position he held until his resignation in June 2023, after which Richard Worley was appointed as acting commissioner. As commissioner, Harrison claimed decreases in homicides and shootings.

== Early life ==
Harrison was born in 1968 or 1969. He received a bachelor's degree in criminal justice from the University of Phoenix and a master's from Loyola University New Orleans. He graduated from the Senior Management Institute for Police, Northwestern University's School of Police Staff and Command, and the Federal Bureau of Investigation's National Executive Institute.

== Career ==
=== New Orleans Police Department ===
Harrison joined the New Orleans Police Department in 1991. He became a sergeant in the Major Case Narcotics Section in 1995, a sergeant for the Eighth District in 1999, and Sergeant of the Public Integrity Bureau in 2000, in which he participated in covert investigations against officers. During one such mission, he posed as a corrupt officer to help take down corrupt officers and a drug ring.

In 2006, he was appointed Lieutenant of the Public Integrity Bureau. In January 2009, he was appointed Lieutenant and Assistant District Commander of the Seventh District, before returning to the Public Integrity Bureau in 2010. He became Commander of the Specialized Investigations Division of the Public Integrity Bureau, which manages the narcotics, vice, criminal intelligence, and gang enforcement units, in January 2011.

He was appointed superintendent by Mayor Mitch Landrieu in August 2014 to replace outgoing Superintendent Ronal Serpas, during which the department was under a federal consent decree.

In 2018, while he was superintendent, New Orleans saw 146 homicides, the lowest figure since 1971, a 28% drop in lethal shootings, while car robberies and thefts had increased in the double digits. He was reappointed as superintendent in May 2018 before informing Mayor LaToya Cantrell of his retirement from the department for Baltimore in 2019. He served 27 years with the department. Cantrell named Shaun Ferguson to replace Harrison on January 14.

=== Baltimore Police Department ===
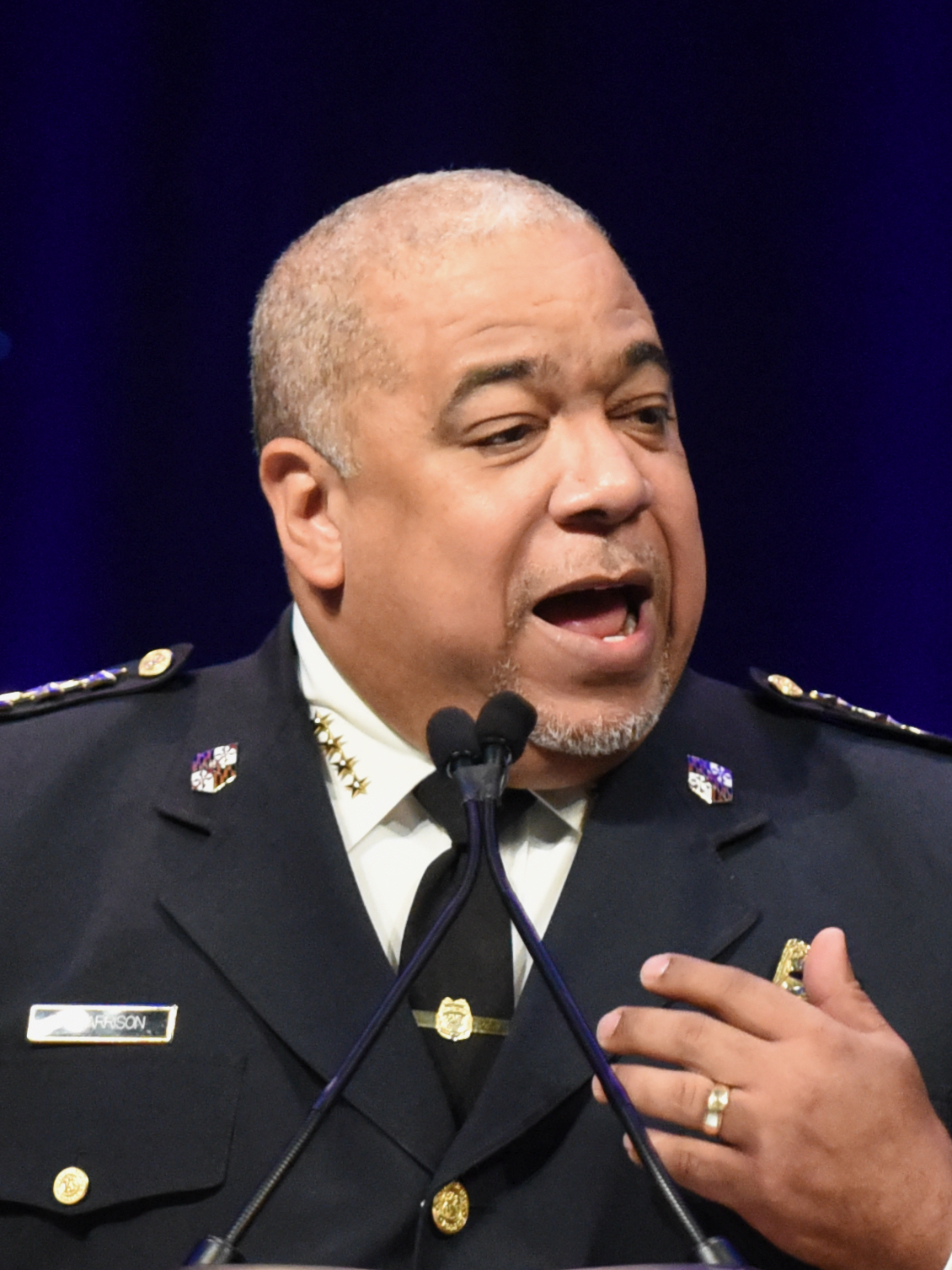
Harrison as commissioner, 2022

While Gary Tuggle was acting commissioner following the resignation of Darryl D. DeSousa, a search panel recommended Harrison, however, Harrison declined, saying he was committed to New Orleans. Mayor Catherine Pugh chose Joel Fitzgerald, the chief of the Fort Worth Police Department, to become commissioner. Fitzgerald, however, withdrew his candidacy due to resumé issues and a medical emergency involving his son, and Harrison agreed to become acting commissioner in January 2019.

Harrison became the 41st commissioner of the Baltimore Police Department on March 12, 2019, during which the Baltimore Police Department was under another federal consent decree due to unconstitutional policing. While commissioner, he claimed a decrease in homicides and non-fatal shootings.

On June 6, 2023, during a budget hearing, Baltimore City Council member Eric Costello asked Harrison if he planned to stay for the entirety of his term as police commissioner. Unhappy with his answer, he reiterated his question twice, then, still dissatisfied with his answer, abruptly called a five-minute recess. Harrison denied rumors that he was going to Washington, D.C., at the end of his contract.

On June 8, 2023, Mayor Brandon Scott, after "numerous conversations over the past few weeks," announced Harrison's resignation and the appointment of deputy commissioner Richard Worley as acting commissioner, the 11th change of power since 2000. He said he has no offers, had not been interviewed for any jobs, and wants to "breathe".

== Personal life ==
Harrison married his high school sweetheart in 1992. They have two children. As of March 2023, he was the president of the board of directors of the Police Executive Research Forum.

Police appointments
Preceded by Gary Tuggle (acting)	Commissioner of the Baltimore Police Department; 2019–2023	Succeeded by Richard Worley
Preceded by Ronal W. Serpas	Superintendent of the New Orleans Police Department; 2014–2019	Succeeded by Shaun Ferguson
