= Ronal W. Serpas =

American university professor and former law enforcement officer

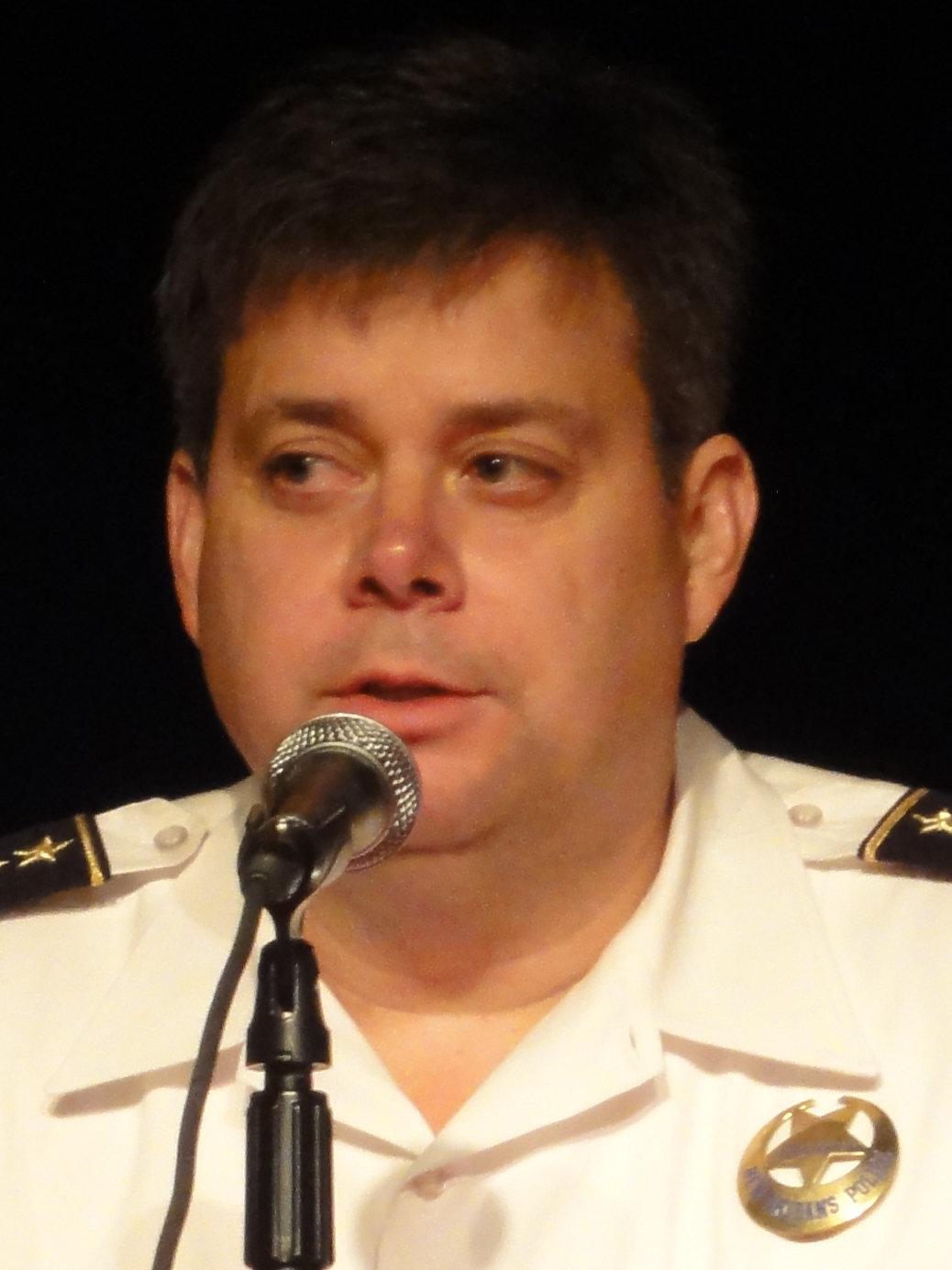
- Ronal Serpas, 2010

Personal details
- Born: 1961 (age 64–65)
- Known for: Superintendent of the New Orleans Police Department (2010-2014), Chief of the Metropolitan Nashville Police Department (2004-2010), Chief of the Washington State Patrol (2001-2004)

Ronal W. Serpas (born c. 1961) is an American university professor at Loyola University New Orleans, and former law enforcement officer who served as the superintendent of the New Orleans Police Department, having been appointed to that post by Mayor Mitch Landrieu in May 2010. He was succeeded as New Orleans Police Superintendent by Michael S. Harrison following his resignation on August 18, 2014. In 2015, Serpas was appointed executive director and co-chair for Law Enforcement Leaders to Reduce Crime and Incarceration. As executive director and co-chair, Serpas spearheaded a group of nearly 200 current and former police chiefs, sheriffs, federal and state prosecutors, and attorneys general from all 50 states, to urge changes to laws and practices that more effectively fight crime while reducing unnecessary incarceration.

Serpas began his law enforcement career with the New Orleans Police Department in June 1980 and rose through the ranks to become assistant superintendent and chief of operations in October 1996, serving in that post under then-superintendent Richard Pennington until July 2001. He served as chief of the Washington State Patrol in the Cabinet of then-Governor Gary Locke from August 2001 until January 2004, and as Chief of the Metropolitan Nashville Police Department from January 2004 until returning to the New Orleans Police Department in May 2010.

During his service as New Orleans Police Superintendent, Serpas was also a member of the executive board of the International Association of Chiefs of Police.

Serpas was superintendent of the New Orleans Police Department during the three years investigated by the Office of the Inspector General, which resulted in a report indicating that 1,111 cases of rape went unreported and/or were not investigated. In June 2015 the New Orleans Police Department reported that during the course of the investigation, PIB learned that a majority of the 840 cases classified as 21 complaints were not related to a call for service regarding criminal activity. Rather, the cases were Sex Offender Checks. A Sex Offender Check occurs when an officer conducts an investigation on a registered sex offender to ensure that they are following all required protocols. The documentation is maintained in a filing system separate from the SVS.
