= Brothers & Sisters season 1 =

Brothers & Sisters
- Season 1
- DVD cover
- No. of episodes: 23

Release
- Original network: ABC
- Original release: September 24, 2006 – May 20, 2007

Season chronology
- Next → Season 2

The first season of Brothers & Sisters, an American serialized family-drama television series created by Jon Robin Baitz, began airing on September 24, 2006, on ABC.

Brothers and Sisters follows the lives of The Walker Family who include: Nora Walker, her brother Saul and her children Sarah, Kitty, Tommy, Kevin, and Justin. The series began with the death of Nora's husband William Walker and follows the discovery that he had a twenty-year affair with Holly Harper and the fact that William and Holly had a child together, Rebecca, that no one knew about. As well as this central plot bringing the family together, each character must deal with the events of their personal lives.

== Cast ==
Brothers & Sisters introduces Nora Walker (Sally Field) and her children; Sarah (Rachel Griffiths), Tommy (Balthazar Getty), Kitty (Calista Flockhart), Kevin (Matthew Rhys) and Justin (Dave Annable) each with their own lives and problems. Husband and father William Walker (portrayed by Tom Skerritt) heads the family. However, his death in the opening episode reveals hidden secrets that serve to test the family and their business 'Ojai Foods' to the limits.

Patricia Wettig stars as Holly Harper; William's longtime mistress and Emily VanCamp appears mid-season as Rebecca Harper; Holly's daughter.

=== Main ===
- Dave Annable as Justin Walker
- Sally Field as Nora Walker
- Calista Flockhart as Kitty Walker
- Balthazar Getty as Tommy Walker
- Rachel Griffiths as Sarah Walker
- Sarah Jane Morris as Julia Walker
- John Pyper-Ferguson as Joe Whedon
- Matthew Rhys as Kevin Walker
- Ron Rifkin as Saul Holden
- Patricia Wettig as Holly Harper
- Kerris Dorsey as Paige Whedon (regular since episode 12)
- Emily VanCamp as Rebecca Harper (regular since episode 15)

=== Recurring and notable guest stars ===
- Tom Skerritt as William Walker
- Josh Hopkins as Warren Salter
- Jason Lewis as Chad Berry
- Rob Lowe as Robert McCallister
- Luke Macfarlane as Scotty Wandell
- Tyler Posey as Gabe Whedon
- Maxwell Perry Cotton as Cooper Whedon
- Eric Winter as Jason McCallister
- Matthew Settle as Jonathan Sellers
- Marika Dominczyk as Tyler Altamirano

== Storylines ==
Tom Skerritt as William Walker, whose death sets up the season.

Sarah, Tommy and Saul - who are most involved with the Walker family business - learn that William embezzled the company's funds. The business revelation also reveals two major revelations on the personal front: William had a mistress, Holly Harper (Patricia Wettig) whom he kept for decades, and the couple were believed to have had a child, Rebecca (Emily VanCamp). The first half of the season introduces the family and their search into William's secrets around Ojai. The second half focuses on Rebecca and her integration into the Walker family. Her mother (Holly) also becomes involved, as she goes into business with Tommy to open 'Walker Landing,' a vineyard.

=== Nora ===
Although Nora is devastated by the death of her husband and the secrets he harbored, she reveals that she knew he was having an affair but she chose to ignore it. She is deeply hurt by the depth of his relationship with Holly upon discovering he bought her a house. Nora embarks on a short romance with her contractor; however, this ends when she realizes she is not ready to date.

Nora begins to express her feelings through writing after finding stories she had written when she was younger and begins to take a class at a local college. Here, she meets and begins dating her professor Mark even though she finds out he has dated one of his other, much younger students. This relationship ends at the opening of 'Walker Landing,' when he kisses Holly and Nora tells him they do not work as a couple. Nora becomes stronger and heals throughout the course of the season, although she struggles with the idea of Justin going back to war and finds it difficult, in the beginning of the season, to work through her issues with Kitty. However, they re-bond through the season and see Justin off at the airport in the season finale.

=== Sarah & Joe ===
Sarah and Joe's marriage hits the rocks as they begin to drift apart. Sarah becomes jealous of Joe and the mother of one of his music students. The marriage is further strained when Joe kisses Rebecca. Although they try to move past this, they eventually decide to divorce. Sarah also spends time with Tommy trying to unlock the hidden accounts left by their father at the family business. After being introduced to Holly and discovering she had a child, Sarah figures out the password - the initials of all his children, including Rebecca - S, K, T, K, J, R.

=== Tommy & Julia ===
Tommy struggles after finding out that his father left Sarah as CEO of the Ojai Foods in his will. He and Sarah clash as he finds it hard reporting to her and Sarah fails to listen to his advice and respect his experience with the company. After Holly decides to use her shares and become involved in the business, she reveals that William planned to open a winery and that it was his plan to have Tommy run it. Tommy decides to leave Ojai and do just this with Holly as his partner. Together, they open 'Walker Landing.'

After he and Julia try for months to conceive, Tommy discovers he is sterile. They turn to Kevin and Justin for support as possible surrogates. Both brothers decide to give sperm, but never discover whose sperm is ultimately used. Everyone is thrilled when Tommy & Julia discover they are expecting twins; however, tragedy strikes when Julia goes into early labor and gives birth to a boy, William, and a girl, Elizabeth. The doctors inform the new parents that William won't make it, and that they must operate on Elizabeth or risk losing her too.

=== Kitty ===
Kitty begins the series living in New York with her long-term boyfriend Jonathan, who proposes. After she is offered a job on a political talk show 'Red White and Blue,' she considers moving back to California, which causes strain in their relationship. Kitty then sleeps with her co-host, Warren, which ends her engagement and she moves back in with her mother. This causes unresolved issues between them to resurface as Nora blames Kitty for Justin's decision to enlist in the war. Although she and Warren try to begin a relationship, they hit many obstacles and eventually end things. When she interviews Senator Robert McCallister, he offers her a job on his communications staff, which she takes. This causes conflict with her brother, Kevin, as he disagrees with McCallister's views, especially on gay marriage. After fighting it for months, Kitty and Robert finally acknowledge their feelings for each other and become engaged at the end of the season.

Kitty has the hardest time, out of all her brothers and sisters, accepting Rebecca into her life, a fact she does not hide from her half-sister.

=== Kevin ===
Kevin has a short-term relationship with Scotty, who he meets through work before beginning a secret fling with Chad Barry, a TV star, who cannot admit to his sexuality. Although Chad & Kevin carry on a secret relationship, this ends when Chad's girlfriend finds out and warns him about Chad's behavior. After an argument in which Kevin tells him he does not want the drama of being with someone who cannot be himself, Chad comes out to the public, but tells Kevin he needs to be alone.

Tensions rise between him and his sister Kitty when she takes a job with Senator Robert McCallister (Rob Lowe), as the Senator does not support gay marriage. Kevin is later introduced to Jason, Robert's gay brother, and they begin a relationship toward the end of the season.

=== Justin ===
Justin struggles with his drug addiction and his family's lack of faith in him; however, as the season progresses, he decides to stay clean and enters rehab. He has an on-again/off-again relationship with an old high school friend and short-time boss Tyler. But, they break up when she admits she cannot take being with someone recovering from drugs and that he shouldn't have to worry about her when he should be taking care of himself. He, out of all the brothers and sisters, spends more time with Rebecca and becomes closest to her.

Later in the season, he receives a letter from the army ordering him to return to active duty which causes him to relapse. He asks his brother Kevin to help him out of it and although Kevin cannot stop him from going, Justin is given an extra six months at home to prepare and say his goodbyes. In the season finale, Justin leaves to serve.

== Episodes ==
No. overall	No. in season	Title	Directed by	Written by	Original release date	US viewers (millions)
1	1	"Patriarchy"	Ken Olin	Jon Robin Baitz	September 24, 2006	15.69
After being offered a co-anchor position on a political talk show, Kitty moves back to Los Angeles to live with her parents. At a family dinner, her four other siblings and father convince Kitty to reconcile with her mother whom she had a falling out with prior to her departure. William, the Walker family patriarch, suffers a heart attack and dies.
2	2	"An Act of Will"	Matt Shakman	Jon Robin Baitz & Marti Noxon	October 1, 2006	13.46
After William's burial, secrets come to light: Sarah informs Tommy and Saul that Ojai Foods is in financial troubles and Justin finds out about his father's affair with the mysterious Holly Harper. Kitty starts her job at "Red, White & Blue". Nora, Kevin and Kitty go to find Justin, who has disappeared.
3	3	"Affairs of State"	Tucker Gates	Jon Robin Baitz & Emily Whitesell & Craig Wright	October 8, 2006	13.01
Kitty and Warren continue to argue but end up in bed. Tommy and Sarah are at odds at Ojai Foods as Jonathan surprises Kitty in Los Angeles. The Walkers decide to throw a pool party in order to suppress the horrible memory of William Walker dying in it. Sarah invites Scotty Wandell, a witness in one of Kevin's cases, to the party just to spite him. At the pool party Nora stuns the family and a shocked Holly that she knew about William's affair.
4	4	"Family Portrait"	Ken Olin	Jon Robin Baitz & Craig Wright	October 15, 2006	12.15
Sarah and Joe learn that Paige has diabetes. Tommy gets Justin a new job as a bellhop but he takes drugs and drinks on the job, so the two brothers come to blows. Kevin is forced to join his mother at a golf outing honoring their father instead of going on a date with Scotty, whom he later sees with another guy. Nora suspects that Saul has feelings for Holly. Kitty feels left out of the family because Nora had hung up a family picture that she's not in.
5	5	"Date Night"	Allison Liddi-Brown	David Marshall Grant & Molly Newman	October 22, 2006	11.92
Kitty arranges a disastrous double date with Jonathan, Warren and the talk show's new intern, Amber, who Kitty suspects Warren slept with. Jonathan tries to help Sarah, Saul and Tommy with their financial crisis at the company. Kevin and Scotty go out on a date and everything goes well up until Scotty kisses Kevin. Nora goes on her first date in forty years with her repairman, David (special guest star Treat Williams). Justin helps Sarah with her fears about giving Paige her insulin shots. Meanwhile, Tommy is still not talking to Justin. Scotty goes to Kevin and they talk and kiss.
6	6	"For the Children"	Frederick E. O. Toye	Jon Robin Baitz & Jessica Mecklenburg	October 29, 2006	12.50
Sarah has to confront Nora with the real situation at Ojai Foods. Meanwhile, Nora insists that the family attend the annual fund raiser for a children's hospital. The siblings' plans go awry when Kevin accidentally insults Scotty, who is catering at the fund raiser and Kitty asks Warren to come along only to find out that he's no longer available. Tommy finds out he's sterile, all the while trying to conceive with Julia. Several scandals also happen that evening that put Nora to shame.
7	7	"Northern Exposure"	Lawrence Trilling	David Marshall Grant & Molly Newman	November 5, 2006	13.53
In order to save the company, the family has to sell the cottage in Ojai, where they spent their summers growing up. Nora wants the family to have one last get-together, but they disagree. Meanwhile, each of them invites their significant other in hope that they will be alone. Upon meeting, buried secrets and open resentment make the passions run high. Kevin tells Scotty to shut up, which hurts him.
8	8	"Mistakes Were Made (Part 1)"	Michael Lange	Jon Robin Baitz & Craig Wright	November 12, 2006	12.78
Justin receives a letter from the U.S. Army stating that he must return for active duty. Fearing for his life, Justin wants to flee to Mexico against Kevin's advice. Sarah has trouble making her stepson Gabe feel more like a part of her family. Nora sleeps at David’s house shocked that she's let it get that far. Sarah and Saul try to crack the password for William’s account and inquire from Holly information about her daughter, Rebecca. Upon cracking the password, Sarah gives Saul an ultimatum. Kevin tries his hardest to win Scotty back, but he breaks up with him. The family recalls September 11, 2001, Kitty coming back home and Justin's decision to enlist.
9	9	"Mistakes Were Made (Part 2)"	Ken Olin	Marc Guggenheim & Greg Berlanti	November 19, 2006	13.04
Kitty puts herself in an awkward position when she asks Senator Robert McCallister (special guest star Rob Lowe) for a favor in return for a non-confrontational interview over his personal life. The family gathers at the hospital after finding out that Justin has attempted suicide by drug overdose. Sarah, Tommy and Kevin take a road trip to Nevada to find their father’s vast and lucrative land. Julia and Tommy announce to the family that she's pregnant.
10	10	"Light the Lights"	Frederick E. O. Toye	Peter Calloway & Cliff Olin	December 10, 2006	10.40
Paige feels that she needs to connect with her Jewish self, so the family plans to celebrate both Christmas and Hanukkah. Kevin and Justin go to court, demanding that the contract Justin has with the Army be annulled. Kitty is offered a job at the TV station without Warren. Sarah, Tommy and Saul try to deceive Holly upon finding out that William had left her 10 million dollars. Nora stops by Holly's house.
11	11	"Family Day"	David Petrarca	David Marshall Grant & Molly Newman	January 7, 2007	11.87
It seems that the entire Walker family is at odds: Kevin argues with Kitty when she tells him that she's seriously considering the senator's offer to join his communication staff, because the senator doesn't support gay marriage. Sarah fights with Joe when he decides to ignore Gabe's drinking problem. And Nora demands a job at Ojai Foods when she learns that Holly also works there, leading to a conflict between her and her son Tommy. The arguing escalates when the whole family is invited to Justin's rehab center in order to show support for him.
12	12	"Sexual Politics"	Sandy Smolan	Monica Owusu-Breen & Alison Schapker	January 14, 2007	12.32
Kevin considers a relationship with a soap opera star (guest star Jason Lewis) who is confused about his sexuality. Kitty hires a matchmaker when she finds out that everyone on McCallister's staff is thinking that the two of them are dating. Nora's butting in gets her involved and the matchmaker sets her up too. But both of them get their share of surprises while attending their dates. Sarah gets insecure when she sees Joe hanging out with a mom of Paige's friend. Julia has a higher sex drive than usual due to her pregnancy and Tommy has trouble keeping up with her.
13	13	"Something Ida This Way Comes"	Michael Lange	David Marshall Grant & Sherri Cooper-Landsman	January 21, 2007	11.79
The siblings are planning a surprise party for Nora's 60th birthday. The plans go awry when Sarah falls ill and Tommy learns that they can't have any alcohol at the party, due to Justin's rehab rules. With Kitty distracting Nora, the burden of planning the party falls onto Kevin. In the midst of all the mess, Saul and Nora's overbearing mother Ida (special guest star Marion Ross) comes in earlier and ruins the surprise.
14	14	"Valentine’s Day Massacre"	Michael Schultz	Peter Calloway & Cliff Olin	February 11, 2007	11.02
In the evening of Valentine's Day the entire Walker family runs amok: Kevin ends up in bed with Scotty, Justin with Tyler and Kitty finally gives in to her attraction for Senator McCallister. In addition to that, Nora goes out with her best girlfriend and they end up arrested for smoking marijuana. Tommy tries to overrule Sarah's decision about the winery by voting with Holly.
15	15	"Love is Difficult"	Michael Lange	Jon Robin Baitz & Molly Newman	February 18, 2007	11.28
Sarah and Joe enter couples' counseling. Kevin learns that Chad broke up with Michelle and that he has a history of dating members of both sexes. Tommy wants Sarah to buy his shares of Ojai Foods so that he may focus on the wine business with Holly. McCallister's staff members conduct a poll about Kitty. Julia is revealed to be carrying twins. Nora starts to express herself artistically through writing. Tommy meets Holly's daughter Rebecca.
16	16	"The Other Walker"	Gloria Muzio	Monica Owusu-Breen & Alison Schapker	March 4, 2007	11.60
Saul reveals to Nora that William and Holly had a daughter, Rebecca, even though he previously agreed with Sarah, Tommy and Kevin that he won't say anything. The news is just too much for the Walker family: Nora becomes furious with Sarah, and so does Kitty. Kevin is angry at Saul and confronts him for betraying them all. Justin and Tyler decide to break up. Sarah tells Rebecca everything, leading to her confronting Holly and, eventually, Holly confronting Sarah and Saul. Justin pays Rebecca a visit.
17	17	"All in the Family"	David Paymer	Sherri Cooper-Landsman & David Marshall Grant	April 1, 2007	9.15
Nora invites Holly and William's daughter Rebecca for dinner to welcome her to the family. The other family members are not as supportive: Kitty doesn't show up, Sarah is giving Rebecca the cold shoulder and Kevin tries to pull Rebecca's hair in order to get her DNA, so that he can be sure that she's really William's daughter. Meanwhile, Kitty meets Robert's children and has a very unpleasant situation and Kevin meets with Donald, Chad's manager.
18	18	"Three Parties"	Sandy Smolan	Jon Robin Baitz & Marc Guggenheim	April 8, 2007	10.80
Kitty has to go to Robert's hometown to interview his old friends. Sarah joins her, and they both get invited to a teenage party. Meanwhile, Nora wants to get to know her writing professor better so the two of them go out for a picnic together and he invites her to a party at his house. Rebecca learns that she and Justin had a mutual childhood friend and they go to his house to a party, where things get out of control. Chad decides to come out which effects negatively to his and Kevin's relationship.
19	19	"Game Night"	Matt Shakman	Story by : Peter Calloway & Cliff Olin; Teleplay by : Molly Newman	April 15, 2007	11.26
Kitty sets Kevin up on a date without telling him that it's with the republican Senator's gay brother, Jason. Kevin ruins the date by going on a rant against the Senator. Nora and Kitty arrange game night with another family with whom they have had a competitive relationship since the siblings' childhoods. That very night, instead of showing unity, they can't stop fighting: Kevin learns what Kitty did, while Kitty is angry at Sarah for her sudden acceptance of Rebecca, who she also invited. The morning after Rebecca gets a guitar lesson from Joe, leading to shocking events. Guest stars include Jenna Elfman and Susan Sullivan, who appeared together in the series Dharma & Greg.
20	20	"Bad News"	Jason Moore	Monica Owusu-Breen & Alison Schapker	April 29, 2007	11.15
A horrified Rebecca tells Justin in confidence that Joe made a pass at her. Professor August blackmails Nora with a failing grade into going out with her. Kitty attempts to help McCallister relax but then must help him comfort staff workers after a helicopter crash kills one of his campaign speech-writers. Holly reveals to Sarah shocking news about the jeopardy of her marriage.
21	21	"Grapes of Wrath"	Michael Morris	Sherri Cooper-Landsman & David Marshall Grant	May 6, 2007	10.83
Tommy and Holly throw a party for family and friends in honor of the opening of their winery. Joe decides to come with Sarah and everyone's giving him the cold shoulder. Kitty mixes wine with some pills from Kevin's bag that she mistook for aspirin and inadvertently tells Kevin that she proposed to Robert. Kevin gets drunk later and lets it slip in front of the entire family. Sarah learns about the agreement between Joe and Justin and gets even angrier. Nora decides to give Mark another chance and takes him with her to the party but he blows it by kissing Holly. Nora and Holly have a fight that results in ways they had not expected. Julia goes into labor prematurely.
22	22	"Favorite Son"	Gloria Muzio	Benjamin Kruger & Daniel Silk	May 13, 2007	11.61
Julia gives birth to the twins prematurely, and she and Tommy are forced to make a difficult decision when their son faces life-threatening complications. Kevin reluctantly helps Kitty deal with a blackmailer who is threatening to reveal damaging information about Senator McCallister to the press. Sarah and Joe tell their children that Joe is moving out. Kitty and McCallister get engaged.
23	23	"Matriarchy"	Ken Olin	Greg Berlanti & Jon Robin Baitz	May 20, 2007	12.31
Nora is planning an engagement party for Kitty, who is having difficulties telling her that she is moving in with Robert. Justin makes plans to say goodbye to everyone individually. At the party, Kevin and Robert's brother Jason kiss, while Rebecca reveals the truth about her departure from Chicago and admits to Justin she willingly kissed Joe. Nora invites Saul's old friend to the party, which he's not very comfortable with. Justin goes off to war and Nora and Kitty see him off at the airport.

== Production ==
The show was created by Ken Olin and Jon Robin Baitz. Greg Berlanti acts as executive producer and show runner for the first season. Brothers and Sisters is produced by Berlanti Television, After Portsmouth, and Touchstone Television (Fall 2006-Spring 2007), which is now ABC Studios (Fall 2007–present).

In the UK Brothers and Sisters was aired on Channel 4, premiering on June 20 at 20:30 with a double bill.

Season 1 is officially composed of 23 episodes, although 24 were produced during the season. The unaired episode, which was supposed to be episode 2, right after the pilot, contains scenes of William's funeral, also used in the actual episode 2. This ghost episode was taken out because of its slowliness.

== Ratings ==
This season averaged 12.2 million viewers based on average total viewers each episode. This ranked the show at #37. In the UK, the show averaged approximately 2.2 million viewers and then settled to 600,000.

Episode number Production number	Title	Original airing	Rating	Share	Rating/share (18–49)	Total viewers (in millions)
1; 1-01	Patriarchy	September 24, 2006	11.0	17	6.2	15.69
2; 1-02	An Act of Will	October 1, 2006	9.1	15	5.5	13.46
3; 1-03	Affairs of State	October 8, 2006	8.6	14	5.3	13.01
4; 1-04	Family Portrait	October 15, 2006	8.3	14	4.9	12.15
5; 1-05	Date Night	October 22, 2006	8.6	13	5.0	11.92
6; 1-06	For the Children	October 29, 2006	9.1	14	5.5	12.50
7; 1-07	Northern Exposure	November 5, 2006	8.7	14	5.3	13.53
8; 1-08	Mistakes Were Made, Part 1	November 12, 2006	8.9	15	5.5	12.78
9; 1-09	Mistakes Were Made, Part 2	November 19, 2006	8.9	15	5.5	13.04
10; 1-10	Light the Lights	December 10, 2006	7.2	12	4.0	10.40
11; 1-11	Family Day	January 7, 2007	8.0	13	4.6	11.87
12; 1-12	Sexual Politics	January 14, 2007	8.2	13	4.8	12.32
13; 1-13	Something Ida This Way Comes	January 21, 2007	8.2	13	4.6	11.79
14; 1-14	Valentine's Day Massacre	February 11, 2007	7.6	12	4.5	11.02
15; 1-15	Love is Difficult	February 18, 2007	8.0	13	4.6	11.28
16; 1-16	The Other Walker	March 4, 2007	8.0	13	4.7	11.68
17; 1-17	All in the Family	April 1, 2007	6.5	11	3.4	9.15
18; 1-18	Three Parties	April 8, 2007	7.4	12	4.1	10.80
19; 1-19	Game Night	April 15, 2007	7.7	13	4.5	11.26
20; 1-20	Bad News	April 29, 2007	7.9	13	4.4	11.15
21; 1-21	Grapes of Wrath	May 6, 2007	7.6	13	4.1	10.83
22; 1-22	Favorite Son	May 13, 2007	8.1	14	4.3	11.61
23; 1-23	Matriarchy	May 20, 2007	8.6	14	4.7	12.31

== See also ==
- Season Two
- Season Three
- Season Four
- Season Five
