= Scotty Wandell =

Fictional character from the television series Brothers & Sisters

Scott Wandell
- Brothers & Sisters character
- Portrayed by: Luke Macfarlane
- First appearance: "An Act Of Will"; 1x02, October 1, 2006
- Last appearance: "Walker Down the Aisle"; 5x22, May 8, 2011
- Created by: Jon Robin Baitz
In-universe information
- Occupation: Chef
- Parents: Wally Wandell; Bertha Wandell
- Spouse: Kevin Walker (m. 2008)
- Children: Olivia Walker Wandell (adoptive); Daniel Walker Wandell

Scott "Scotty" Wandell is a fictional character on the ABC television series Brothers & Sisters. He is portrayed by Luke Macfarlane. His relationship with Kevin Walker (Matthew Rhys) was included in TV Guide's list of "The Best TV Couples of All Time".

== Character history ==
=== Background ===
Scotty Wandell is a gay man who grew up in Oxford, Mississippi, until he moved to New York City and then later to California to start an independent life because his parents, Wally and Bertha Wandell, didn't accept his homosexuality when he came out. As stated in episode 2.16 Prior Commitments, his parents never used the word "gay" until he told them he was. Scotty has worked many temporary jobs including cater-waitering. He was also a head chef at San Estephe, the five-star restaurant where he interned as an assistant sous chef while attending culinary school in Pasadena. He is currently running his own restaurant with Saul, Kevin's uncle.

=== Season 1 ===
Scotty met Kevin Walker at Kevin's law office. He was a key witness to insurance fraud for the company he was temporarily working for as a receptionist. Scotty (who at the time was more flamboyant than Kevin) quickly deduced Kevin's homosexuality and jokingly accused him of being ashamed and trying to "pass" for heterosexual. Kevin held a grudge over Scotty for these accusations, but after Sarah invited him to the family's pool party, Kevin started to enjoy Scotty's presence. After making a date, Kevin had to cancel due to the guilt that his mother Nora imposed on him to get him to go with her to a golf tournament. When she changed her mind, and wanted to go to the movies instead, they ran into Scotty and a man, both holding hands with each other.

Scotty then dropped by Kevin's office to tell him that the male companion was just a friend. They set up another date, and bonded by talking about their backgrounds. Scotty impulsively kissed Kevin, he was put off, and remained distant for the time after. The date ended on a sour note, but the next day, Scotty dropped by Kevin's apartment to apologize for being judgmental and to tell Kevin how much he got to Scotty. Kevin expressed relief that Scotty wasn't perfect and kissed him in front of a neighbor. After jokingly slamming the door in his face, Kevin pulled Scotty inside the apartment in order to take their relationship further.

When Scotty was unable to get off work to attend a charity benefit with Kevin, Kevin offered to pay Scotty's salary for the time he would miss. Scotty bristled at the idea of being "bought" by Kevin, and felt he was being made to feel inferior due to his social status. Coincidentally, Scotty turned out to be a waiter at the benefit. When a drunk Kevin apologized to him, they kissed and made up, but Scotty's boss fired him for putting his personal life before the job. Kevin threatened the boss with an anti-discrimination lawsuit unless he agreed to rehire Scotty, with a bigger salary. Kevin and Scotty made up.

When Kevin found out the family ranch house was about to be sold, he and Scotty decided to go for a weekend visit, not realizing the rest of his family had had the same idea. During the weekend, Kevin's brother Tommy, who had recently discovered his sterility, asked Kevin for his sperm in order to father a child with Tommy's wife Julia. Kevin turned him down. When Sarah found out she angrily confronted Kevin at the dinner table, and asked Scotty for his opinion. Kevin unthinkingly snapped that Scotty was not family and he should "shut up". He quickly apologized, but a hurt Scotty went home. Kevin confided to Kitty that he didn't want to bring a child into the world because he was afraid the child would be considered different for having a gay uncle as a biological father, and face the kind of suffering he had faced. Kitty assured him the Walkers would never let anyone hurt the child, and Kevin (along with their other brother, Justin) agreed to be a sperm donor for Tommy and Julia. When Kevin got back to town, Scotty would no longer return his calls. Scotty dropped by the office to accept a settlement check, and Kevin joked that Scotty could take him to dinner since he was now on Kevin's financial level. A hurt Scotty said it had taken him a long time to accept himself, and in only two months, Kevin had made him feel worthless. He then told Kevin to rip up the check. Soon after, Kevin called Scotty and finally put his heart on the line. Scotty asked him for the check, and thanked him for the time they had spent together, but said the relationship was over. Kevin barely held his tears at bay as he ended the conversation.

On Valentine's Day, a mutual friend (Michelle), set up Kevin and Scotty on a blind date, unaware that Kevin was having an affair with Michelle's boyfriend, Chad. With jealously playing up and strong feelings for Scotty, Kevin slept with Scotty that night. The next morning when Chad called Kevin and asked if he slept with Scotty, Chad hung up before Kevin could take the conversation further. Scotty, overhearing this, thought Kevin only slept with him to get back at Chad, which was not true. Scotty wished Kevin good luck then left.

=== Season 2 ===
A few months later, Scotty was arrested for DUI. He went to Kevin's office for legal help with the arrest, because he states the officer only arrested him because he had a problem with his homosexuality. Kevin managed to have the case dismissed. As a thank you present, Scotty treated Kevin to a private dinner at the fancy restaurant where he worked as a cook. After the meal, Scotty nearly kissed Kevin before he stopped himself. Kevin somewhat nervously said that he had a boyfriend now - Jason - who he was living with, and who was now away in Malaysia (as a missionary). Scotty took this to mean that Kevin really had changed. Kevin left, but later returned to tell Scotty that they'd never had the chance to be friends, and he very much wanted to be Scotty's friend. Scotty was in the middle of a busy service, but told Kevin that was fine with it. Scotty's tuition then was due, and he could no longer afford his apartment, cell phone and insurance. Kevin invited Scotty to live with him. In the meantime, Kevin had not been talking to Jason for quite a while because Jason did not respond to Kevin's calls. Kevin felt emotionally lonely and also realized he still loved Scotty. One night, after a meal (lobster and wine) and champagne, he and Scotty slept together. A few days later, he finally got a call from Jason. He told Jason he had slept with Scotty and then broke up with Jason. When Jason returned to town, he told Kevin he'd undergone a spiritual crisis and could not bring himself to call. Scotty arranged a meal (soft-shell crabs) between the three of them which turned tense. After a quarrel, Jason left, and Scotty moved into his car, as he assumed Kevin no longer wanted him around. The next morning, Kevin convinced him he wanted to continue the relationship, and the two moved in together.

Soon after, Scotty cut himself badly and incurred large expenses because he had no health insurance. Kevin suggested they enter a domestic partnership so Scotty could share his coverage. Scotty, stung that Kevin only cared about practicality, rejected the idea. Kevin's uncle, Saul, called him after driving his car into a tree while drunk. Kevin and Saul had fallen out some months earlier because Kevin suspected Saul was gay (Scotty had seen him at a gay dinner party he'd catered) but Saul had vehemently denied it. After Kevin picked him up, Saul despondently asked Kevin how a man Saul's age could deal with being gay. The loneliness of Saul's life led Kevin to realize just how special his relationship with Scotty was. When he returned home, he proposed marriage to Scotty, even getting down on one knee. Scotty, moved by Kevin's words, happily said yes. Before the marriage, Scotty told Kevin that his parents refused to attend the wedding. Kevin, outraged (although Scotty said he was fine with it), went with his brothers to Arizona to try and talk his parents into going, which failed. Scotty's father gave Kevin a small box however, which was made by Scotty when he was little and contained the cuff links that Mr. Wandell wore at his wedding. Scotty was moved by this. At the end of the second-season finale, they were married.

=== Season 3 ===
Scotty and Kevin must settle into married life which is made difficult with Kevin spending most of his time at work, attempting to secure a promotion as a partner. While at a business dinner it is implied to Kevin by his boss that he'd be more successful should he keep his sexuality a secret. Although uncomfortable he is initially tempted to go along with this which upsets Scotty. Though in the end he decides against it and takes a new job working with Robert. Meanwhile, Scotty is doing well in his career and is eventually promoted to head chef. Although happy for him, Kevin struggles with the fact that Scotty now brings home more money.

Scotty also spends some time taking care of Kevin after he has a liver transplant to help Elizabeth, which leads him to clash with Nora on the best way to help him heal. When Kevin's ex-boyfriend Chad Berry returns he intrigues the couple with the suggestion that they participate in a threesome. Although they are at first tempted they decide it could ruin their relationship.

=== Season 4 ===
Scotty and Kevin decide to start a family and look into surrogacy. They constantly disagree about how to approach it; Scotty's good friend Michelle offers to be their surrogate and Scotty agrees to allow her to be the surrogate, as it would make the pregnancy more personal to Scotty. He is irritated by Kevin's business like manner towards his friend. They are happy to learn towards the end of the season that Michelle is pregnant.

Due to tough economic times Scotty is devastated to learn that his restaurant is being closed down forcing him out of a job. When Kevin also becomes unemployed because of Robert cancelling his campaign, Scotty decides to take some catering jobs but Kevin tells him it's time for him to follow his dreams. Along with Saul, Scotty starts plans to open his own restaurant.

Scotty is unharmed in the accident in the season finale.

=== Season 5 ===
In the year that's passed since the accident, Scotty and Kevin have become distant. Due to his feelings about Robert being in a coma, Kevin has been neglecting Scotty while opening Saul's and his (Scotty's) new restaurant. He later reveals that he had a one-night stand which causes a strain on their marriage. Kevin eventually decides to forgive him because he know he was to blame for their problems. The couple also decide to look into adoption again as their surrogate Michelle suffered a miscarriage. They eventually adopt a young girl named Olivia. Although she is at first nervous in her new family, she becomes settled into life with Scotty and Kevin. Olivia's biological brother sued for full custody of Olivia, but lost. Kevin represented Scotty and him before the judge. Nora told him that he could visit Olivia and still be a part of her life. He visited Olivia and Kevin at Scotty's restaurant.

While out with Olivia, Scotty encounters Michelle in public. Michelle has not had any contact with him since her miscarriage. She explains that she is only in town for a couple of days visiting her mother and didn't have time to see him. He becomes worried about her because they have been best friends their whole lives and he convinces Kevin to help him look for her. They go to the airport where they know she will be taking her flight and see her with a baby, but at the sight of them she runs to the gate.

After some time and interaction with police and attorneys, Scotty and Kevin are worried that seeing Michelle has caused her to flee and they will never get a chance to see the baby (who was born in the exact time frame that their surrogate baby would have been born in), named Daniel. Michelle calls Scotty and sets up a meeting in a coffee shop, but Scotty doesn't tell Kevin of the meeting in case his hard-headedness or rage would cause Michelle to flee again and they would lose all hope of getting their baby. Scotty is angry with Michelle; he claims that he has forgiven her and decided that they should find a way to all raise the baby together without her getting arrested. Michelle calls Scotty's phone but Kevin picks up and eventually screams at her that the baby is not genetically related to her when Scotty comes in and Michelle hangs up. Scotty blames Kevin for the possibility that they may never see Daniel again. Days later, Kevin and Scotty are putting Olivia to bed when Kevin receives a call from Justin who claims he is on their doorstep. Kevin and Scotty open the door to Justin who is holding a baby, and he claims, "She just left him." Kevin and Scotty are in shock as Olivia walks in the room and asks, "Whose baby is that?" Olivia runs away from Kevin and Scotty during the night while Kevin is at Luc's bachelor party. Scotty called Kevin to tell him. Olivia went back to the foster care facility she was living in. Scotty went to the facility to convince Olivia to come back home. He told her that Daniel is new to the family and because she has been a member of the family longer than Daniel, that she could help him adjust to the new family. Olivia agreed to come home with Kevin and Scotty.

== Markus ==
(Season 5, episode: "An Ideal Husband") – Scotty comes clean with Kevin, explaining that he had an affair with a man, although careful not to mention his name or occupation. After a brief period of not talking and with Kevin sleeping on the couch, their marriage seems to be on the verge of failure, despite the fact Kevin's mother Nora Walker and sister Kitty Walker try to convince him otherwise. On the night of Nora's charity event, Kevin nicknames a waiter "rob" and leaves, before his brother Justin Walker, who is working the bar, gains knowledge of a waiter who claimed to have had sex with the chef of the restaurant and hoped to succeed again. Justin tells Scotty, who learns that Nora's brother Saul Holden, hired him to work as a waiter that night, although completely oblivious to his part in Scotty's affair. Scotty asks Justin to get rid of him but without Kevin knowing, however Kevin gains knowledge of the fact and attacks a waiter at random, thinking he is the person Scotty slept with. When Justin attacks the real Markus, the whole event watches him leave in a hurry and Justin tries to calm Kevin down.

Scotty and Kevin remain separate until Kevin's sister's (Sarah Walker) daughter, Paige Whedon, asks them for their help on her debating project. Kevin, after a failed attempt to get rid of Scotty from the presence of himself, Paige and Nora, helps Paige. Later on, Scotty shows up at Sarah's house and finds Kevin there. The two were tricked by Paige, who strove to repair their marriage. After a long talk in which they reconcile their marriage, Kevin and Scotty show up at Paige's debate session and start with a clean slate.
