= Rebecca Harper =

Fictional character from the television series Brothers & Sisters

- Brothers & Sisters character
- Portrayed by: Emily VanCamp
- Duration: 2007–10
- First appearance: "Love is Difficult"; 1x15, February 18, 2007
- Last appearance: "A Righteous Kiss"; 5x04, October 17, 2010
- Created by: Jon Robin Baitz
In-universe information
- Occupation: Photographer
- Parents: William Walker(father); Holly Harper (mother)

Rebecca Harper is a fictional character on the ABC television series Brothers & Sisters. She is portrayed by Emily VanCamp.

People magazine described the character of Rebecca Harper as "a young woman who oozes sarcasm and sexuality", while Maclean's referred to her as "the nurturing, all-forgiving girlfriend".

== Character background ==
At the age of 16, she has an affair with one of her teachers in Chicago. The teacher commits suicide when his wife finds out about this, then she moves back home.

In season 1, it is thought that she is the daughter of the late William Walker and his mistress Holly Harper, Rebecca's mother. This is because William Walker's fund account's password is "S-K-T-K-J-R", the first letter of his children's names. Holly Harper denies that he is the father. The Walker family is initially reluctant to meet her, but she is invited to a family dinner and trivia game. In season 2, she starts to feel more confident in her place in the Walker family and becomes more outspoken. Holly Harper's former boyfriend, David Caplan, a photographer, comes to visit. She starts exploring her interest in photography with him. However, she starts to doubt who her father is and gets a DNA test. According to the test, it is found out that David is the real biological father of Rebecca, something that he did not know. She tells the Walkers this after Justin, one of the Walker brothers, reveals that he has romantic feelings for her. The Walkers find out that the "R" in William Walker's password actually stands for Ryan, a child he had with another mistress. In season 3, Justin and Rebecca are in a relationship, but this is kept secret until Justin tells the rest of the family. At the end of the season, they're engaged. In season 4 she plans her wedding with Justin and becomes pregnant. She has a huge argument with Justin which ends with Justin telling her that he is unsure about everything. After he realizes how much he wants to be a husband and a father, he later goes to see an upset Rebecca and tells her he still wants to get married. Rebecca has a miscarriage. Rebecca and Justin spend their honeymoon in the Ojai Ranch. In season 5, a year has passed since the last season, and Rebecca moves out of the home she shared with Justin. Justin and Rebecca divorced while he was in Afghanistan. They still have feelings for each other. Rebecca gets offered to be a photographer in New York and any relationship between her and Justin is ended after she leaves to New York.

== Storylines ==
=== Background ===
Rebecca was thought to have been the daughter of William Walker (Tom Skerritt), the late patriarch of the Walker family, and his longtime mistress Holly Harper (Patricia Wettig), although it was later revealed that she was not William Walker's daughter. When Rebecca was 16, one of her teachers initiated an affair with her, which continued until his wife found out. Many people told the Harpers to press charges, but Rebecca begged her mother not to. The man and his family moved to Chicago. When he called Rebecca to apologize, the affair started again, and she moved there to be with him. When his wife found out again, he killed himself. She told everyone that she was studying theater at Northwestern University, and had dropped out of school and returned home.

=== Season 1 ===
The Walker family first learned of Rebecca's existence while attempting to crack the password to a locked account which contained funds that William Walker had embezzled from Ojai Foods. Holly initially denied that Rebecca was William's daughter, revealing the truth only after the account was unlocked with the password "S-K-T-K-J-R" (the initials of the five Walker children, plus R for Rebecca.) Sarah (Rachel Griffiths), Tommy (Balthazar Getty) and Kevin (Matthew Rhys), the three Walker siblings involved in the family business, initially agreed to keep Rebecca's existence a secret from the rest of the Walker family, although Saul eventually told Nora about Rebecca.

Rebecca knew William Walker only as her mother's boyfriend, not as a father. Holly insisted that Rebecca's father was not William, but the struggling film director she had dated before she knew William. However, after Sarah informed Rebecca of her parentage and confronted Holly with the fact that there was an extra R in the computer password, Holly tried to reach Rebecca via a phone hook-up.

Justin was the first Walker sibling to reach out to Rebecca, after meeting her and discovering that they had high school friends in common. Rebecca and Justin attended a party together, at which Rebecca used drugs and Justin got into a fistfight trying to protect her. In another conversation, Rebecca told Justin that "there's a new black sheep in town, get used to it & I'm ready to move to a new city".

The rest of the Walkers were more reluctant to meet her, although they slowly made sincere attempts to reach out to her. Nora (Sally Field) invited Rebecca to a family dinner, at which Kevin pulled out a strand of her hair to test her DNA. Horrified, Rebecca left the house quickly, although she later confided to her mother that although the Walkers struck her as crazy, she had always secretly wanted to be part of a large, crazy, dysfunctional but loving family who took care of her.

Sarah, Tommy and Kevin extended social invitations to Rebecca, who agreed to meet them all at the Walker home. Kitty (Calista Flockhart), who had been the most reluctant of the siblings to meet Rebecca, came home unaware that Rebecca was in the house and became irritated.

Rebecca was invited to the Walker family game night, where she generally felt like an outsider. However, she bonded with Sarah's husband, Joe (John Pyper-Ferguson), over a shared love of music, and accepted his offer of guitar lessons. In the final question of trivia, Rebecca gave the wrong answer, saying that the last name of Juliet from Shakespeare's Romeo and Juliet was Montague but it was really Capulet, and lost the Walker family game. Later, Rebecca and Kitty bond for a moment when Kitty reassures her that getting the wrong answer during trivia wasn't the end of the world since she once did the same.

At her first guitar lesson, Rebecca and Joe kissed. When she later told Justin, Rebecca reported that Joe had initiated the kiss, but did not reveal that she had been flirting quite openly with him and attempted to prolong the kiss after Joe backed away. Holly used the incident as an opportunity to get revenge on Sarah for revealing Rebecca's paternity, only later revealing that she did not, in fact, believe that Rebecca was a wholly innocent party. Rebecca and Holly got into a fight, and Rebecca moved into Nora's house with her own possessions, car & job with some extra benefits.

=== Season 2 ===
In the early part of Season 2, Rebecca was still in the process of working out her place in the Walker family. She sometimes avoided expressing her own opinions on things for fear of alienating her new siblings, but as she began to feel more accepted by the Walkers she began to feel more confident, finally speaking up while shopping with her sisters for bridesmaid dresses for Kitty's wedding. She also arranged a job for her friend Lena (Emily Rose) as the office manager at Walker Landing, the winery business that Holly operated in partnership with Tommy Walker, but this ultimately resulted in Lena sleeping with both Tommy and Justin.

However, things began to change when a former boyfriend of Holly's, a film director and photographer named David Caplan (Ken Olin), unexpectedly arrived for a visit. With some guidance from David, Rebecca began exploring her own interest in photography as well. After a series of events caused Rebecca to begin doubting what she knew about her paternity, she took a DNA test which revealed that David Caplan was her father, rather than William Walker. She confronted David, who told her that he did not previously know she was his daughter and would not have been a stable or reliable father if he had known. She did not immediately tell the Walkers that she was not related to them, but kept the test results to herself until after Justin revealed that he had some romantic feelings for her. She then confronted Holly, who called Rebecca ungrateful for all the sacrifices Holly had made for her and threw her out of the house. The Walkers learned that the "R" in the computer password had never stood for Rebecca at all, but for Ryan (Luke Grimes), a child William had with yet another mistress.

In the final episode of the season, Justin and Rebecca acknowledged that they had feelings for each other, and began to discuss the possibility of commencing a relationship.

=== Season 3 ===
In the Season Premiere, Rebecca and Justin keep their relationship away from the rest of the family, but later he tells everyone. In the rest of the episodes, Justin and Rebecca become closer. In the episode Troubled Waters, she has suspicions about Tommy's new business deal. Later, Ryan Lafferty, the newly discovered half-brother for the Walkers gets a bit too close to Rebecca for Justin's comfort. Rebecca and Justin are now engaged at the end of season 3, episode Mexico.

=== Season 4 ===
This season sees Rebecca still working at Ojai Foods as she plans her wedding with Justin. In Episode 7, she discovers she is pregnant but has yet to tell Justin. In the episode "Pregnant Pause," she tells Kitty about her pregnancy. Justin hears the news through the grapevine and Rebecca confirms it. Justin tells her he is happy, while actually he begins to have second thoughts about everything. When their rehearsal dinner arrives, Rebecca and Justin have a huge argument that culminates in him telling her that he is unsure of everything. He then misses their rehearsal dinner because a child is injured in an accident and he comes to the boy's aid. After he realizes how much he wants to be a husband and a father, he goes to see an upset Rebecca and tells her about the accident, professing his love and telling her that he still wants to get married. Their wedding day arrives, where they decide to have a beach wedding. The ceremony is interrupted when Kitty collapses and no one can find her pulse. Kitty is fine after getting a bone marrow transplant from Ryan, but Rebecca miscarries the baby. In part 2 of "Time after Time", they elope and spend their honeymoon in the old Ojai Ranch. However, it is interrupted by Nora and Holly who are looking for Narrow Lake. Later, the rest of the Walkers who come to find Nora and celebrate Justin and Rebecca's marriage.

=== Season 5 ===
A year has passed since the season 4 finale, and it is revealed Rebecca has moved out of the home she shared with Justin. Justin also reveals to his family that while he was in Afghanistan they divorced, however, they still have feelings for each other, when Holly once again forgets that Rebecca is her daughter she turns to Justin for comfort, this leaves Rebecca confused about the future because she was offered her dream job of photography in New York. They end things for good and everything is final. Rebecca leaves for New York and leaves Justin devastated.
