= Luke Macfarlane =

Canadian actor (born 1980)

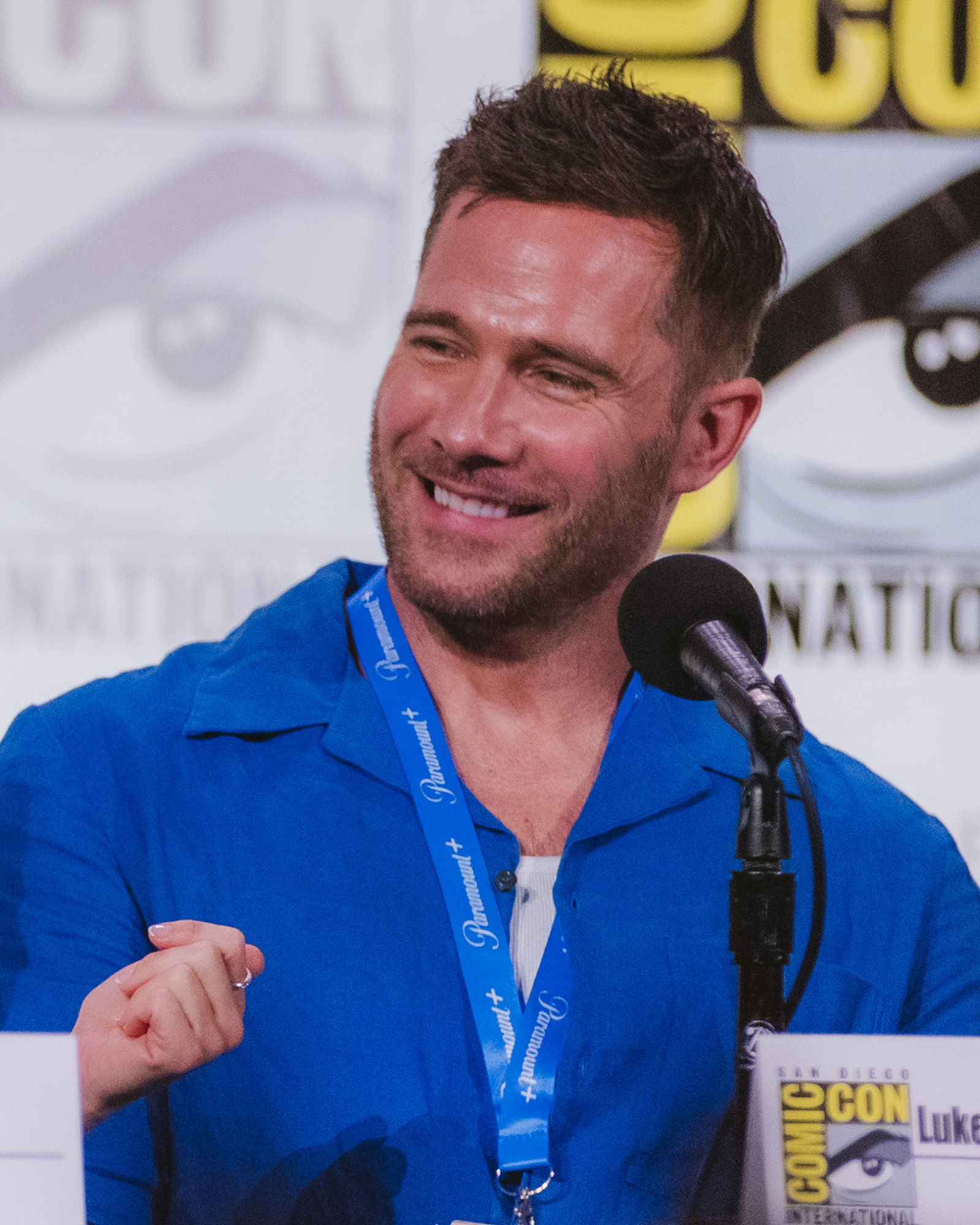
- Macfarlane in 2025
- Born: Thomas Luke Macfarlane; 19 January 1980 (age 46); London, Ontario, Canada
- Citizenship: Canada; United States (since 2018)
- Education: Juilliard School (BFA)
- Occupation: Actor
- Years active: 2003–present
- Partner: Hig Roberts (2020–present)
- Children: 1

Thomas Luke Macfarlane (born 19 January 1980) is a Canadian actor and former singer. He is known for playing Scotty Wandell on the ABC television drama Brothers & Sisters (2006–2011), RAC Agent D'avin Jaqobis on the Space television science fiction series Killjoys (2015–2019), the romantic lead in a number of Hallmark Channel movies, and Aaron Shepard in the gay romantic comedy film Bros (2022).

== Early life and education ==
Thomas Luke Macfarlane was born on 19 January 1980, in London, Ontario. His father Thomas was the director of student health services at the University of Western Ontario, and his mother Penny is a mental health nurse at a London hospital. Macfarlane attended London Central Secondary School with twin sister, Ruth, and older sister Rebecca. Macfarlane went to school at the Lester B. Pearson School for the Arts, then later studied drama at Juilliard in New York City.

== Career ==
Macfarlane had an early role playing opposite Cynthia Nixon in Robert Altman's miniseries Tanner on Tanner on the Sundance Channel. He subsequently had leading roles on the 2005 FX series Over There (playing PV2 Frank "Dim" Dumphy) and in the 2009 two-part miniseries titled Iron Road.

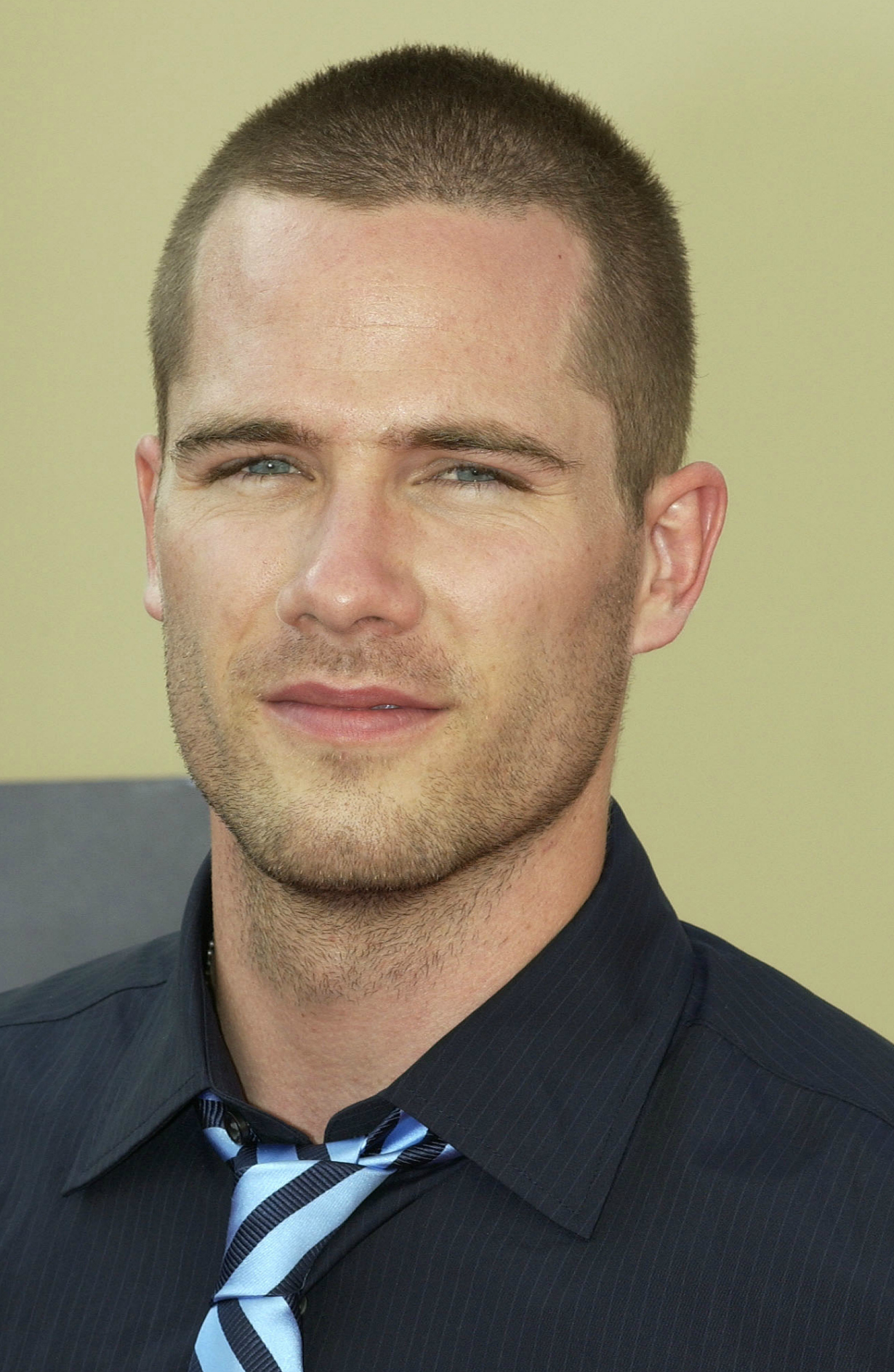
Macfarlane in 2006

His first notable role was as Scotty Wandell on ABC's Brothers & Sisters, husband to Kevin Walker (played by Matthew Rhys), one of the "brothers" of the show. Macfarlane's other notable television roles include Jason Howell in the Canadian sitcom Satisfaction, Rick Lincoln on NBC's The Night Shift, Chaplain Hopkins on PBS's Mercy Street. Macfarlane guest starred on an episode (Episode 12, Season 2) of Shifting Gears on 28 January 2026 as Sam Parker.

Macfarlane starred as D'avin Jaqobis in Syfy's Killjoys.

Macfarlane has also starred in TV movies, such as Hallmark Channel's The Memory Book, Christmas Land, Maggie's Miracle Christmas, The Birthday Wish, and The Mistletoe Promise (2016).

He co-starred with Billy Eichner in the 2022 film Bros, the first gay romantic comedy from a major studio featuring an openly LGBTQ+ principal cast. In a 2025 interview, MacFarlane said his contract with the Hallmark Channel changed many times since he started working for the company in 2014.

=== Stage ===
Macfarlane was one of the four leads in Juvenilia at the Playwrights Horizons Theater from 14 November – 21 December 2003. He played the lead role in the American premiere of the play Where Do We Live, staged at the Vineyard Theatre in May 2004. The production was cited by the 2005 GLAAD Media Awards for Outstanding New York Theatre: Broadway and Off-Broadway. He also appeared with Jill Clayburgh and Hamish Linklater in the off-Broadway production of The Busy World is Hushed, again at Playwrights Horizons, in Summer 2006. He reprised his role of Thomas for the L.A. Premiere at the Skirball Cultural Center from 7–11 February 2007.

Macfarlane was part of the one-night celebrity performed staging of Howard Ashman's unproduced musical Dreamstuff. The musical was re-imagined by Howard's partners Marsha Malamet and Dennis Green and performed one night only at Los Angeles' Hayworth Theatre as part of the Bruno Kirby celebrity reading series, directed by actor Michael Urie. Luke starred in the show alongside Eden Espinosa, Vicki Lewis, Fred Willard and David Blue.

Macfarlane starred in the world premiere of stage drama Reverberation in February 2015 at Hartford Stage in Connecticut.

=== Music career ===
Macfarlane was the lead singer and a songwriter for the band Fellow Nameless, which began in his 8th grade along with some of his classmates at Lester B. Pearson School for the Arts under the name of Slipnaught, a name they randomly chose from a dictionary because they did not have a name for the band when it came time to perform on stage. Fellow Nameless came from Slipnaught mainly because the band members hated the original name, and so, Fellow Nameless was born at London Central Secondary School. Fellow Nameless has produced one underground album, which was a half-studio, half-live CD album, and they recorded an additional ten songs that never got put out including three songs that were recorded for a development deal with Maverick Records. They played a showcase for Danny Strick A&R of Maverick Records and in the end got passed over. The once thought of as defunct London, Ontario based band, Fellow Nameless, later had two incarnations without Macfarlane as lead singer. The first incarnation came in the second quarter of 2004 with the creation of Van A Primer and a new singer, Matthew Pearn. Their most recent incarnation, as of March 2006, has three of the remaining band members under the new band name of Cancel Winter.

== Personal life ==
Macfarlane came out as gay during an interview with The Globe and Mail on 15 April 2008. He has dated Prison Break actor Wentworth Miller. On 12 June 2018, Macfarlane was naturalized as an American citizen.

Macfarlane plays the cello, and this skill was used in the Hallmark movie Chateau Christmas. He also plays the trumpet.

On 4 June 2023, Macfarlane and his partner, alpine skier Hig Roberts, announced the birth of their first child.

== Filmography ==
Film
Year	Title	Role	Notes
2004	Kinsey	Bruce Kinsey	
2006	Recalled	Lieutenant Sefton	Short film
2006	Trapped Ashes	Vincent	Segment: "My Twin, The Worm"
2013	Erection	Dean	Short film
2017	Rock, Paper, Scissors	Peter Harris	
2021	Single All the Way	James	On Netflix
2022	Bros	Aaron Shepard	
2025	This Is Not a Test	Mr. Baxter	
2026	Let's Have Kids!	Dr. Morrison	
TBA	Lone Star Bull	Bull Jackson	Post-production

Television
Year	Title	Role	Notes
2004	Tanner on Tanner	Stuart DeBarge	TV miniseries
2005	Over There	PV2 Frank "Dim" Dumphy	Main role; 13 episodes
2006–2011	Brothers & Sisters	Scott "Scotty" Wandell	Recurring role (seasons 1–2); main role (seasons 3–5); 81 episodes
2009	Iron Road	James Nichol	TV miniseries
2012	Beauty & the Beast	Phillippe Bertrand	Episode: "Proceed with Caution"
2013	Person of Interest	Agent Alan Fahey	Episode: "Proteus"
2013	Smash	Patrick Dillon	Episodes: "The Tonys", "The Nominations"
2013	Satisfaction	Jason Howell	Main role; 13 episodes
2014–2017	The Night Shift	Rick Lincoln	Recurring role; 8 episodes
2014	The Memory Book	Gabe Sinclair	Television movie (Hallmark)
2015	Supergirl	Agent Donovan	Episodes: "Red Faced", "Human for a Day"
2015–2019	Killjoys	RAC Agent D'avin Jaqobis	Main role, 5 seasons
2015	Christmas Land	Tucker Barnes	Television movie (Hallmark)
2016–2017	Mercy Street	Chaplain Hopkins	Main role
2016	The Mistletoe Promise	Nicholas Derr	Television movie (Hallmark)
2017	The Birthday Wish	David McKinely	Television movie (Hallmark)
2017	Karen Kingsbury's Maggie's Christmas Miracle	Casey Cummins	Television movie (Hallmark Movies & Mysteries)
2018	A Shoe Addict's Christmas	Jake Marsden	Television movie (Hallmark)
2019	Just Add Romance	Jason Tucker	Television movie (Hallmark)
2019	Sense, Sensibility and Snowmen	Edward Ferris	Television movie (Hallmark Movies & Mysteries)
2020	A Valentine's Match	Zach Williams	Television movie (Hallmark)
2020	Chateau Christmas	Jackson Lewis	Television movie (Hallmark)
2021	Taking a Shot at Love	Ryan Cooper	Television movie (Hallmark)
2021	Christmas in My Heart	Sean Grant	Television movie (Hallmark)
2022	Moriah's Lighthouse	Ben McCain	Television movie (Hallmark)
2022	A Magical Christmas Village	Ryan Scott	Television movie (Hallmark)
2023–present	Platonic	Charlie Greeves	Main role
2023	Notes of Autumn	Leo	Television film (Hallmark)
2023	Amish Stud: The Eli Weaver Story	Eli	Television film (Lifetime)
2023	Catch Me If You Claus	Chris	Television film (Hallmark)
2024–present	Invincible	Rick Sheridan (voice)	Season 2 onwards
2024	Hacks	Brad	Episode: "Better Late"
2025	Shifting Gears	Sam Parker	Season 2
2026	Caught by Love	Jake	Hallmark Television Movie

Music videos
Year	Artist	Title	Role
2003	Seal	Love's Divine	Guy chasing after girlfriend in taxi

== Theatre ==
Year	Title	Role
2003	Juvenilia	Brondie Chase
2004	Where Do We Live?	Stephen
2004	In The Wings (Stage Reading)	Nicky Sanchez
2006	The Busy World Is Hushed	Thomas
2007	The Busy World Is Hushed	Thomas
2008	Dreamstuff (Stage Reading)	
2009	The Jazz Age	F. Scott Fitzgerald
2010	Sam Bendrix at the Bon Soir	Sam Bendrix
2010	Some Men	
2011	The Normal Heart	Craig Donner/Grady
2011	Sam Bendrix at the Bon Soir	Sam Bendrix
2012	The Normal Heart	Felix Turner
2012	8 (Stage Reading)	Jeff Zarrillo
2012	Sam Bendrix at the Bon Soir	Sam Bendrix
2015	Reverberation	Jonathan
2016	Running on Fire	
2017	Big Night	Austin
