= Sarah Walker (Brothers & Sisters) =

Fictional character from the television series Brothers & Sisters

- Brothers & Sisters character
- Portrayed by: Rachel Griffiths
- First appearance: "Patriarchy"; 1x01, September 24, 2006
- Last appearance: "Walker Down the Aisle"; 5x22, May 8, 2011
- Created by: Jon Robin Baitz
In-universe information
- Occupation: CEO of Ojai Foods; CFO of Greenatopia
- Father: William Walker
- Mother: Nora Walker
- Brothers: Tommy Walker; Kevin Walker; Justin Walker
- Sisters: Kitty Walker Rebecca Harper
- Spouse: Joe Whedon (m. 1997; div. 2008); Luc Laurent (m. 2011)
- Sons: Cooper Whedon
- Daughters: Paige Whedon
- Uncles: Saul Holden (uncle)
- Nephews: Evan McCallister (adoptive); William Walker II; Daniel Walker Wandell
- Nieces: Elizabeth Walker; Olivia Walker Wandell (adoptive)
- Other relatives: Ida Holden (maternal grandmother); Robert McCallister (brother-in-law); Scotty Wandell (brother-in-law)

Sarah Louise Walker Laurent (formerly Whedon) is a fictional character on the ABC television drama Brothers & Sisters. She is portrayed by actress Rachel Griffiths.

== Character history ==
=== Background ===
Sarah is a member of the Walker Family. A businesswoman in the family business and a mother of two young children, Sarah often struggles to balance her personal life with the duty of being a mother and a wife. Being the oldest of the family, she's very close with all of her siblings—even though she had trouble working with her brother Tommy at Ojai Foods because of his competitiveness, especially when she was announced in her fathers will as the President of Ojai. She was born October 20, 1967. Sarah attended the Wharton School and holds a Master of Business Administration.

She is also a liberal-minded Democrat.

=== Season 1 ===
Sarah was shocked at her father's sudden death. She was the first to later discover that he was an embezzler, having stolen money from the pension fund company. In his will, her father William designated her as the company's new president, a position her brother Tommy felt should have been his. Sarah tried her best to keep the family company afloat.

At the same time she was dealing with her personal life, she discovered that her father had had a long affair with mistress Holly Harper which produced a daughter, Rebecca. At that point only she and her brothers Kevin and Tommy knew about her. Fortunately, Sarah, Tommy and Kevin later discovered that their father had bought land worth millions of dollars; the company was saved. Unfortunately, William had a last surprise for her: he had made Holly one of the major shareholder of his company. Much to Sarah's displeasure, Holly decided that she wanted to be an integral part of the company instead of selling the shares. This created tensions within the company until Holly decided to leave to create her own winery. Much to Sarah's surprise, her brother Tommy decided to quit as well and became Holly's business partner.

Sarah's relationship with her husband Joe was also strained due to her being a businesswoman and the fact that Joe is a homemaker, amongst other things. This led them to therapy to help reconnect, which ultimately would not succeed. Their daughter Paige was later diagnosed with diabetes.

It was at that time that Holly's daughter Rebecca came back to town. Holly never told her that William might be her father. Infuriated with Holly about all the things she had done to her family, particularly her mother who was shocked at the news that her husband had an illegitimate daughter, Sarah spoke to Rebecca regarding the truth about her paternity.

For a time, Nora was mad at Sarah for keeping the truth about Rebecca away from her, but ultimately they were able to work things out.

Rebecca later confided to Sarah's brother Justin, telling him that Joe had kissed her during their guitar lesson. Justin confronted Joe, stating that Joe must tell Sarah about the incident or Justin would. Instead, Joe took Sarah on a romantic weekend on the beach. Upon returning, Joe told Justin not to tell Sarah anything. However, without permission from Rebecca, Holly went to her office and told Sarah about what Joe had done. This caused a huge argument between Sarah and Joe, at which point Joe stormed out. He later returned and apologized, but it was clear that their relationship had been further damaged.

=== Season 2 ===
In "Home Front", the season premiere, Sarah has sex with Joe and, upon hearing that Justin might be dead, realizes she wants her husband back. However, Joe tells her that he is now sure that he wants the divorce. Sarah also is upset in this episode due to her perception that she has no one in the family to talk to about her failing marriage. In the next episode Rebecca confesses that she kissed Joe back. Joe and Sarah meet at a café and he confesses that he has started to date his ex-wife, Paula.

While they worked out their divorce, Joe and Sarah shared custody of their children. Joe floored Sarah by abruptly announcing he wanted full custody. Joe had a lawyer who was expert in that area and unbeknownst to Sarah, he had already contacted most of their acquaintances to support him. The judge granted him full temporary custody. Their daughter did not take well to the upheaval, and ran away. They soon found her at Nora's house. Joe blamed Sarah, but realized what the arrangement was doing to their children, and agreed to go back to shared custody.

Sarah's divorce to Joe becomes final in the episode "Compromises", when she signs divorce papers after having consumed several shots of tequila during a karaoke night out with Kevin — at the urging of Scotty's friends. Afterward, a previously flirtatious relationship intensifies between Sarah and Graham Finch, a specialist in Asian markets working with Ojai Foods.

Saul almost lost the family business by going behind Sarah's back on a deal she didn't want to do. Sarah goes to her sibling Kevin for legal help, but when that fails they approach Tommy and Holly, who decide that their only choice is to merge the two businesses. Sarah didn't like the idea, but it was the only way to save Ojai Foods. It also had the effect of making her and Tommy co-Presidents. Sarah calls it quits with her and Graham's fling/relationship knowing that their pleasure and the bad deal almost killed the family business.

After realizing Rebecca wasn't her half-sister. Sarah showed her the picture that led the Walkers on a crazy journey. To Sarah's surprise, Rebecca said that the baby in the picture wasn't her. She said "I never had cheeks like this." Then at Kevin's wedding she proposes that they could still have another sibling out there. Everybody tells her to just cut it out as they have had enough drama. Sarah refuses to let it go as her father's password was all his children's initials, SKTKJ and R. Sarah wanted to know who the R was and who was the baby in the picture. Then that night when Kevin and Scotty returned home Kevin recalled one night with his father when he saw the picture and asked his father who the baby was. His father's reply was that it was the child of a very good friend of his (a female friend) who had just died and that the baby's name was Ryan. Kevin connected the dots and realized Ryan was the R. He quickly ran over to Sarah's to tell her. The next day we see them telling Nora to sit down as they have big news for her.

=== Season 3 ===
In season 3, Sarah and Saul decide to leave Ojai Foods after they can no longer continue to work alongside Holly. She becomes the CFO at a green foods startup company named 'Greenatopia'. This brings her ex Graham back into her life briefly after he offers to invest in the company if she agrees to take lead which she turns down. After Tommy resorts to illegal activity in an attempt to remove Holly from the family business and flees to Mexico, Sarah returns to Ojai. After doing so she must learn to work alongside Holly.

=== Season 4 ===
Sarah leaves for France in the season premiere after a summer of terrible online dating. While there she meets Luc Laurent whom she has a fling with, this however is cut short when she discovers Kitty has cancer and she must return home. Luc follows her back to the USA and although they try to keep their romance alive they soon realize that their different lifestyles do not fit together and Luc leaves. Soon after Sarah meets Roy, the single father of one of Paige's classmates. They embark upon a brief relationship but this ends when Sarah receives a text from Luc. Once Luc comes back to the USA he and Sarah face more challenges as he struggles to gain a green card and from her son Coop who struggles to accept Luc as part of the family.

After trying to save Ojai Foods by uncovering the secrets surrounding 'Narrow Lake'; an area of land bought by her father, Sarah, along with the rest of the family, decide they need to sell the company. Sarah takes this particularly hard as she sees it as a personal failure. She and Nora find original plans which detail that William was planning on building a house for Nora on Narrow Lake. They later find out that the land was sitting on a billion dollar aquifer that could supply most of California, and the rest of their lives.

=== Season 5 ===
Sarah and Luc become engaged and plan to marry in May 2011. Sarah also decides she wants to get back into business and buys a company that is in control of the radio station where Nora works. Her brother, Tommy comes home and announces that he's engaged to a woman named Rose. Rose starts digging into the Walker's past and discovers that William may not be Sarah's biological father, another man, Nick Brody, may be. However, when Brody comes to Pasadena, he says that it's not possible for him to be her father, and Rose and Tommy leave soon afterwards. Justin soon discovers that Brody lied about his blood type, he has the same one as William, so he could be Sarah's father. Brody makes Justin promise not to tell Nora, but he does. Nora and Justin sneak around trying to get DNA to test whether Brody or William is Sarah's father. They get the results, which reveal that Brody is Sarah's father. Sarah wishes to have nothing to do with Brody and still sees William Walker as her father. Her uncle Saul wants her and Luc to sign a pre-nup, but she doesn't because she knows that she's marrying the right man this time around. Sarah also wants to sell her house so Luc can have more space for his art work, but Luc convinces her not to because he believes that this is their home. Sarah and Luc marry while Sarah meets her half-sister Lori with Nick Brody walking her down the aisle. Brody confesses to Nora that he has four other kids, and Sarah is not shocked to the news, but pleased and asks her parents to dance.
