= Brothers & Sisters (2006 TV series) =

American family drama television series

- Genre: Family drama
- Created by: Jon Robin Baitz
- Starring: Dave Annable; Sally Field; Calista Flockhart; Balthazar Getty; Rachel Griffiths; Sarah Jane Morris; John Pyper-Ferguson; Matthew Rhys; Ron Rifkin; Patricia Wettig; Kerris Dorsey; Emily VanCamp; Maxwell Perry Cotton; Rob Lowe; Luke Macfarlane; Luke Grimes; Gilles Marini
- Narrated by: Sally Field (season 5)
- Composer: Blake Neely
- Country of origin: United States
- Original language: English
- No. of seasons: 5
- No. of episodes: 109 (list of episodes)

Production
- Executive producers: Jon Robin Baitz; Greg Berlanti; Ken Olin; Mark B. Perry; David Marshall Grant; Monica Owusu-Breen; Alison Schapker; Molly Newman; Michael Morris; Sally Field; Sarah Caplan; Marti Noxon
- Producers: Michael Morris; Nicole Carrasco; David Marshall Grant; Sherri Cooper-Landsman; Liz Tigelaar; Michael Foley
- Running time: 42–43 minutes
- Production companies: Berlanti Television; After Portsmouth Productions; ABC Studios (Note: Credited as Touchstone Television for season 1)

Original release
- Network: ABC
- Release: September 24, 2006 – May 8, 2011

Related
- Secretos de familia; Hermanos y hermanas

Brothers & Sisters is an American family drama television series that centers on the Walker family and their lives in Los Angeles and Pasadena, California. The series aired for five seasons on ABC from September 24, 2006, to May 8, 2011. For the entirety of its run, it was broadcast on Sunday nights following Desperate Housewives.

Brothers & Sisters features an ensemble cast led by Sally Field as Nora Walker, with Rachel Griffiths as Sarah, Calista Flockhart as Kitty, Balthazar Getty as Tommy, Matthew Rhys as Kevin and Dave Annable as Justin Walker, Nora's grown children. Patricia Wettig co-starred as Holly Harper, with Emily VanCamp later joining the cast as Rebecca Harper, as well as Ron Rifkin as Saul Holden.

Throughout the series, Field won both a Primetime Emmy Award and a Screen Actors Guild Award for playing Nora, while Griffiths received nominations for two Primetime Emmy Awards and two Golden Globe Awards for portraying Sarah Walker.

On May 6, 2011, ABC canceled the series after five seasons.

== Premise ==
The series revolves around the lives and problems of the wealthy Walker family in the wake of the death of family patriarch William Walker (Tom Skerritt), the founder of the family business Ojai Foods. The family consists of wife and mother Nora Walker (Sally Field) who must deal with revelations about her husband's infidelity, and her children Sarah (Rachel Griffiths) and Tommy (Balthazar Getty), both married executives at Ojai Foods, Kitty (Calista Flockhart), a conservative activist, Kevin (Matthew Rhys), a gay lawyer, and youngest sibling Justin (Dave Annable), who has recently returned from the war in Afghanistan with a substance abuse problem. They were joined by Scotty (Luke Macfarlane) – Kevin's boyfriend and later husband – and Nora's brother Saul (Ron Rifkin) and Holly Harper (Patricia Wettig), William's mistress. Plotlines typically revolved around the romantic relationships of the family, their business fortunes, especially with regard to the control of Ojai Foods, and the relationship between the siblings. Most conflicts were resolved with a renewed call for family unity and a lot of wine.

The show's narrative launched with the death of William Walker at Kitty's birthday party. His death causes a number of secrets from his life to be revealed—secrets that impact the remainder of his family and which include the introduction of William's mistress Holly Harper and her daughter Rebecca.

Other main storylines throughout the series include the personal, political (usually through Robert and Kitty's and later Kevin's careers) and professional lives of Nora and all the brothers and sisters; their relationships with each other; interaction with Rebecca and her mother (William's mistress) Holly; and the running of the family business Ojai Foods—which is mostly looked after by Saul, Sarah and Tommy along with Holly and Rebecca from season 3 onwards. After the family sells Ojai Foods, Scotty and Saul open a restaurant and Nora begins working at a radio station which Sarah decides to buy.

== Characters ==
- Justin Walker, son of Nora and William Walker; ten years younger than Kevin; paramedic, war veteran and former med school student; recovering alcoholic and drug addict.
- Nora Walker, widow of William Walker, mother of Sarah, Kitty, Tommy, Kevin and Justin; Grandmother to Paige, Cooper, Evan, Elizabeth, William II, Olivia and Daniel; homemaker.
- Kitty Walker, daughter of Nora and William Walker, one year younger than Sarah; adoptive mother of Evan; writer and former communication director, television and radio host; widow of Robert McCallister.
- Sarah Laurent, eldest daughter of Nora Walker and William Walker; mother of Paige and Cooper; president of Ojai Foods and former CFO of Greenatopia; ex-wife of Joe Whedon and wife of Luc Laurent.
- Tommy Walker, son of Nora and William Walker, two years younger than Kitty; father of Elizabeth and William II; former president of Ojai Foods; ex-husband to Julia Ridge and fiancé of Rose.
- Joe Whedon, ex-husband of Sarah Walker; father of Gabe, Paige and Cooper; music teacher.
- Julia Walker, ex-wife of Tommy Walker; mother of Elizabeth; teacher.
- Kevin Walker, son of Nora and William Walker, one year younger than Tommy; adoptive father of Olivia; father of Daniel; biological father of Elizabeth and William II; pro bono lawyer and former communications director and corporate lawyer; husband of Scotty Wandell.
- Saul Holden, brother of Nora Walker; restaurant owner and former CFO of Ojai Foods; fiancé of Jonathan Byrold.
- Holly Harper, ex-mistress of William Walker; mother of Rebecca; former chairwoman and CEO of Ojai Foods and actress; fiancée of David Caplan.
- Paige Whedon, daughter of Sarah Walker and Joe Whedon
- Rebecca Harper, daughter of Holly Harper and David Caplan; former advertising executive at Ojai Foods.
- Cooper Whedon, son of Sarah Walker and Joe Whedon
- Robert McCallister, husband of Kitty Walker; father of Sophie and Jack and adoptive father of Evan; former California senator; ex-husband of Courtney McCallister.
- Scotty Wandell, husband of Kevin Walker; father of Daniel and adoptive father of Olivia; restaurant owner and head chef.
- Ryan Lafferty, son of Connie Lafferty; former employee at Ojai Foods.
- Luc Laurent, husband of Sarah Walker; painter and former underwear model.

== Cast members ==
=== Main cast ===
Actor	Role	Seasons				
Actor	Role	1	2	3	4	5
Dave Annable	Justin Walker	Main	Main	Main	Main	Main
Sally Field	Nora Walker	Main	Main	Main	Main	Main
Calista Flockhart	Kitty McCallister	Main	Main	Main	Main	Main
Rachel Griffiths	Sarah Walker	Main	Main	Main	Main	Main
Balthazar Getty	Tommy Walker	Main	Main	Main	Main	Guest
John Pyper-Ferguson	Joe Whedon	Main	Recurring			
Sarah Jane Morris	Julia Walker	Main	Main	Main	Guest	
Matthew Rhys	Kevin Walker	Main	Main	Main	Main	Main
Ron Rifkin	Saul Holden	Main	Main	Main	Main	Main
Patricia Wettig	Holly Harper	Main	Main	Main	Main	Main
Kerris Dorsey	Paige Whedon	Main	Main	Main	Main	Recurring
Emily VanCamp	Rebecca Harper	Main	Main	Main	Main	Guest
Maxwell Perry Cotton	Cooper Whedon	Recurring	Main	Main	Main	Recurring
Rob Lowe	Robert McCallister	Recurring	Main	Main	Main	
Luke Macfarlane	Scotty Wandell	Recurring	Recurring	Main	Main	Main
Luke Grimes	Ryan Lafferty			Guest	Main	
Gilles Marini	Luc Laurent				Guest	Main

=== Recurring cast ===
- John Apicella as Frank (season 5)
- Amy Aquino as Dr. Joan Avadon (season 4)
- Beau Bridges as Nick Brody (season 5)
- Max Burkholder as Jack McCallister (seasons 1–3)
- Luc Charbonnier as Ben Tyler (season 3)
- Richard Chamberlain as Jonathan Byrold (season 5)
- Peter Coyote as Mark August (season 1)
- Jeremy Davidson as Jack Randall (season 5)
- Ryan Devlin as Seth Whitley (season 5)
- Marika Dominczyk as Tyler Altamirano (seasons 1, 5)
- Justine Dorsey as Sophie McCallister (seasons 1–3)
- Edwina Findley as Jill (season 5)
- Peter Gerety as Dennis York (season 4)
- Danny Glover as Isaac Marshall (season 2)
- Nigel Havers as Roger Grant (seasons 3–4; guest 5)
- Josh Hopkins as Warren Salter (season 1)
- Jay Karnes as Roy Scovell (season 4)
- Matt Letscher as Alec Tyler (seasons 3–4)
- Jason Lewis as Chad Barry (seasons 1, 3)
- Will McCormack as Ethan Tavis (season 3)
- Denis O'Hare as Travis March (seasons 2, 4)
- Ken Olin as David Caplan (seasons 2–5)
- Roxy Olin as Michelle McCormack (seasons 1 & 4–5)
- Eric Christian Olsen as Kyle DeWitt (season 3)
- Tyler Posey as Gabe Whedon (season 1)
- Keri Lynn Pratt as Amber Trachtenberg (season 1)
- Isabella Rae Thomas as Olivia (season 5)
- Emily Rose as Lena Branigan (season 2)
- Matthew Settle as Jonathan Sellers (season 1)
- Tom Skerritt as William Walker (seasons 1–4)
- Sonja Sohn as Trish Evans (season 3)
- Jon Tenney as Simon Craig (season 4)
- John Terry as Karl West (season 5)
- Steven Weber as Graham Finch (seasons 2–3)
- Treat Williams as David Morton (season 1)
- Eric Winter as Jason McCallister (seasons 1–2)
- Odette Yustman as Annie Miller (season 5)

== Episodes ==
Season	Episodes	Originally released		Rank	Rating
Season	Episodes	First released	Last released	Rank	Rating
1	23	September 24, 2006	May 20, 2007	37	7.3
2	16	September 30, 2007	May 11, 2008	38	7.6
3	24	September 28, 2008	May 10, 2009	33	7.2
4	24	September 27, 2009	May 16, 2010	34	7.0
5	22	September 26, 2010	May 8, 2011	52	5.6

=== Season 1 (2006–07) ===
Most of the season focuses on The Walkers dealing with the loss of William Walker and the secrets uncovered by his death, most notably the discovery of Holly Harper, a woman he had an affair with, and her daughter Rebecca. The season also introduces the audience to the lives of the Walker siblings who must deal with their jobs, turbulent love lives and each other.

=== Season 2 (2007–08) ===
The second season focused mainly on the romantic lives of the Walker siblings. As Kitty and Robert start planning their wedding, Kevin runs into Scotty (his lover from the first season) and they become a couple. Sarah must now deal with her divorce and being a single parent while Tommy and Julia go through serious issues after struggling with the loss of one of their twins. Nora begins a new romance with one of Robert's staff. Nora and Rebecca try to help Justin regain his life after being injured in the war.

=== Season 3 (2008–09) ===
After the discovery that she is not, in fact, a Walker, Rebecca must deal with her new place in the family and her new relationship with Justin which could be in trouble with the appearance of Ryan—William's actual secret child. Kitty and Robert face problems in their marriage as they try to adopt a baby while Kevin and Scotty settle into married life. Nora decides she wants a career of her own after spending most of her life in the back seat and finds a new romance. With Holly becoming a major presence at Ojai, Saul and Sarah decide to quit leading to a new business venture for the eldest Walker sibling, while Tommy turns to drastic measures to take back the family business.

=== Season 4 (2009–10) ===
This season sees Kevin and Scotty decide to start a family while Kitty finds her family may be torn apart when she receives unexpected news that she has lymphoma, cancer of the lymph nodes. Sarah finds love with Luc, a man she met in France who traveled to America to be with her, but the dream doesn't seem to last in her real life. Justin is finding it hard to balance his engagement to Rebecca with his medical school studies, while Rebecca has troubles of her own. After not having their wedding Rebecca comes to find out she is now pregnant with Justin's baby but Rebecca ends up having a miscarriage which causes some more strain on their relationship. While her children go through difficult times Nora must try her hardest to get them through their troubles and Ryan causes trouble for the Walkers and Ojai by teaming up with a man from William's past. Will Holly's obsession with the secrets of Ojai ruin her relationship with David? The season ends with a horrific car crash that leaves Holly severely injured and the fate of Senator Robert McCallister unsure.

=== Season 5 (2010–11) ===
The events of the fifth season begin one year after the season 4 finale.

The season starts with Kitty holding on to Robert who has been in a coma since the accident when she is faced with the decision of whether or not to turn off his life support. Sarah considers selling the new land and water found in Ojai to start a new chapter with Luc. Kevin, who has become a low-paid pro-bono lawyer, and Scotty begin the adoption process after their surrogate, Michelle, appears to lose their baby. Saul bumps into an old flame, Jonathan, who now campaigns for a HIV+ charity, and reveals that it was Jonathan who infected Saul. Justin and Rebecca struggle to reconnect after his year abroad leaving her feeling abandoned and questioning her future. Meanwhile, Holly has developed long-term memory loss after the accident and is struggling to remember her life and loved ones.

Finally, Nora has become distant from her family whilst she searches for a new career and purpose when a unique job opportunity presents itself at a local radio station. Later in the season, Nora's first love, Nick Brody, returns with a revelation that could change the Walker family forever.

== Home media ==
Season	Episodes	Title	DVD release date		
Season	Episodes	Title	Region 1	Region 2	Region 4
1	23	The Complete First Season	September 18, 2007	February 25, 2008	October 26, 2007
2	16	The Complete Second Season	September 23, 2008	March 16, 2009	October 28, 2008
3	24	The Complete Third Season	September 1, 2009	October 19, 2009	September 18, 2009
4	24	The Complete Fourth Season	August 31, 2010	October 11, 2010	September 24, 2010
5	22	The Complete Fifth Season	August 23, 2011	November 14, 2011	November 2, 2011

== Production ==
The series is from producer Ken Olin (star of thirtysomething and producer of Alias) and Jon Robin Baitz, one of Broadway's most prominent playwrights (The Substance of Fire). Noted producer Greg Berlanti was also an executive producer and showrunner during season one. Berlanti continued to serve on the series as executive producer. Mark B. Perry (The Wonder Years and One Tree Hill) served as the showrunner for twelve episodes before departing the show in the aftermath of the 2007–2008 Writers Guild of America strike. Perry was replaced by Monica Owusu-Breen and Alison Schapker who served as showrunners until they were replaced by David Marshall Grant shortly into season 4.

After the series pilot was shot, and the show was picked up by ABC, the series underwent some moderate changes. Most notably, several of the roles were recast:

- The Walker family had originally been the March family, and the original matriarch of the show was Iva March, who'd been cast with veteran theater actress Betty Buckley. The role was ultimately renamed Nora and cast with Sally Field.
- The character of Kevin had originally been named Bryan, and had been cast with actor Jonathan LaPaglia. Like the current Kevin character, the Bryan version of the character was also gay, but had been married, and was going through a divorce. The Bryan incarnation of the character also had a child, and he and his ex-wife were going through a custody battle. Bryan's child later reappeared during the first season as the show, where he was recast as "Gabe," Joe's child from his first marriage. The show has subsequently received positive press attention for its depiction of Kevin Walker, who came to be seen as a breakthrough in the depiction of gay men on television: he has had several love interests, has kissed his boyfriends on-screen, and had a commitment ceremony with his partner Scotty in the second-season finale—the first such ceremony ever shown on American network television between series regulars rather than minor recurring or guest characters.
- The character of Jonathan, the man with whom Kitty was involved as the show began had originally been cast with writer and actor Dan Futterman. They had previously acted alongside each other as lovers in the film The Birdcage. The role was ultimately recast with actor Matthew Settle.
- The roles of Sarah and Joe's children, Paige and Cooper Whedon (originally named Paige and Teddy Traylor), were initially portrayed by Gage Golightly and Jimmy Pinchak. Their son also had autism in the original pilot. However, the roles were ultimately recast and the autism storyline was dropped.

Robert McCallister was the name of a character on a previous Greg Berlanti production, Jack & Bobby, about a boy who grew up to be the president of the United States. As with the Robert McCallister on Brothers & Sisters, the character on Jack & Bobby was a Republican who had a wife named Courtney and a son named Jack.

Brothers & Sisters is produced by Berlanti Television, After Portsmouth, and Touchstone Television (Fall 2006–Spring 2007), which is now ABC Studios (Fall 2007–2011).

On May 13, 2011, ABC canceled the series after five seasons.

== Location ==
Brothers & Sisters was filmed in the Greater Los Angeles area, including Los Angeles, Santa Monica, South Pasadena, Pasadena, and other locations.

== Critical reception ==
Cameron McGaughy from DVD Talk described the series as "exceptional".

== Ratings ==
=== U.S. ratings ===
Seasonal rankings (based on average total viewers per episode) of Brothers & Sisters on ABC:

Season	Timeslot (EDT)	Season premiere	Season finale	TV season	Rank	Viewers (in millions)	Viewers high (in millions)	Viewers low (in millions)	18–49 average	18–49 high	18–49 low
1	Sunday 10:00 PM	September 24, 2006	May 20, 2007	2006–2007	#37	11.0	16.10	9.13	4.67	6.2	3.4
2	Sunday 10:00 PM	September 30, 2007	May 11, 2008	2007–2008	#38	10.7	13.26	8.50	4.22	5.1	3.0
3	Sunday 10:00 PM	September 28, 2008	May 10, 2009	2008–2009	#33	10.7	12.35	8.84	3.47	4.8	2.8
4	Sunday 10:00 PM	September 27, 2009	May 16, 2010	2009–2010	#34	10.4	10.78	7.65	2.85	3.7	2.2
5	Sunday 10:00 PM	September 26, 2010	May 8, 2011	2010–2011	#52	8.2	9.47	5.70	2.60	3.0	1.6

== Accolades ==
Awards and nominations for Brothers & Sisters
Year	Award	Title	Recipient	Result
2007	Australian Film Institute Award	Best International Actress	Rachel Griffiths	Nominated
2007	Casting Society of America Award	Best Dramatic Episodic Casting	Gillian O'Neil, Jeanie Bacharach	Nominated
2007	Casting Society of America Award	Best Dramatic Pilot Casting	Gillian O'Neil, Jeanie Bacharach	Won
2007	Emmy Award	Outstanding Casting for a Drama Series	Gillian O'Neil, Jeanie Bacharach	Nominated
2007	Emmy Award	Outstanding Lead Actress in a Drama Series	Sally Field	Won
2007	Emmy Award	Outstanding Supporting Actress in a Drama Series	Rachel Griffiths	Nominated
2007	Gold Derby TV Award	Best Actress in a Drama Series	Sally Field	Won
2007	Gold Derby TV Award	Best Supporting Actress in a Drama Series	Rachel Griffiths	Nominated
2007	GLAAD Media Award	Outstanding Drama Series		Won
2007	Peoples Choice Award	Favourite New TV Drama		Nominated
2007	Satellite Award	Best Actress in a Drama Series	Sally Field	Nominated
2007	Satellite Award	Best Supporting Actress in a TV Series, Mini-Series or TV Movie	Rachel Griffiths	Nominated
2007	Satellite Award	Best Drama Series		Nominated
2007	Young Artist Award	Best Family TV Drama Series		Nominated
2008	Australian Film Institute Award	Best International Actress	Rachel Griffiths	Nominated
2008	Casting Society of America Award	Best Dramatic Episodic Casting	Gillian O'Neil	Nominated
2008	Emmy Award	Outstanding Casting for a Drama Series	Gillian O'Neil, Jeanie Bacharach	Nominated
2008	Emmy Award	Outstanding Lead Actress in a Drama Series	Sally Field	Nominated
2008	Emmy Award	Outstanding Supporting Actress in a Drama Series	Rachel Griffiths	Nominated
2008	Gold Derby TV Award	Best Actress in a Drama Series	Sally Field	Nominated
2008	Gold Derby TV Award	Best Actress in a Drama Series	Calista Flockhart	Nominated
2008	Gold Derby TV Award	Best Drama Series		Nominated
2008	Gold Derby TV Award	Best Ensemble of the Year		Nominated
2008	Gold Derby TV Award	Best Guest Actor in a Drama Series	Danny Glover	Nominated
2008	Gold Derby TV Award	Best Supporting Actor in a Drama Series	Matthew Rhys	Nominated
2008	Gold Derby TV Award	Best Supporting Actress in a Drama Series	Rachel Griffiths	Nominated
2008	GLAAD Media Award	Outstanding Drama Series		Won
2008	Golden Globe Award	Best Actress in a Television Drama Series	Sally Field	Nominated
2008	Golden Globe Award	Best Supporting Actress in a Series, Mini-Series or Motion Picture made for Television	Rachel Griffiths	Nominated
2008	Prism Award	Best Performance in a Drama Series	Dave Annable	Won
2008	Prism Award	Best Performance in a Drama Series	Sally Field	Won
2008	Satellite Award	Best Actress in a Drama Series	Sally Field	Nominated
2008	Screen Actors Guild Award	Outstanding Performance by a Female Actor in a Drama Series	Sally Field	Nominated
2009	Emmy Award	Lead Actress in a Drama Series	Sally Field	Nominated
2009	Gold Derby TV Award	Best Actress in a Drama Series	Calista Flockhart	Nominated
2009	GLAAD Media Award	Outstanding Drama Series		Won
2009	Golden Globe Award	Best Actress in a Drama Series	Sally Field	Nominated
2009	Golden Globe Award	Best Supporting Actress in a TV Series, Mini-Series or TV Movie	Rachel Griffiths	Nominated
2009	Screen Actors Guild Award	Outstanding Performance by a Female Actor in a Drama Series	Sally Field	Won
2010	GLAAD Media Award	Outstanding Drama Series		Won
