= Kevin Walker (Brothers & Sisters) =

Fictional character from the television series Brothers & Sisters

- Brothers & Sisters character
- Portrayed by: Matthew Rhys
- First appearance: "Patriarchy"; 1x01, September 24, 2006
- Last appearance: "Walker Down the Aisle"; 5x22, May 8, 2011
- Created by: Jon Robin Baitz
In-universe information
- Occupation: Lawyer, communications director
- Parents: William Walker (father); Nora Walker (mother)
- Siblings: Sarah Laurent (sister); Kitty Walker (sister); Tommy Walker (brother); Justin Walker (brother); Rebecca Harper(half-sister)
- Spouse: Scotty Wandell (m. 2008)
- Children: Olivia Walker-Wandell (adoptive); Daniel Walker-Wandell
- Other relatives: Ida Holden (maternal grandmother); Saul Holden (uncle); Paige Whedon (niece); Cooper Whedon (nephew); William Walker II (nephew); Elizabeth Walker (niece); Evan McCallister (adoptive nephew)

Kevin Herbert Walker is a fictional character on the ABC television series Brothers & Sisters. He is portrayed by the Welsh actor Matthew Rhys. In a two-part 2010 episode, the actor Kasey Campbell played a teenage Kevin in flashback sequences set in 1986. Rhys is the second actor to appear in all the episodes of the series. His relationship with Scotty Wandell was included in TV Guide's list of the best TV couples of all time.

== Character history ==
=== Background ===
Kevin, born April 18, 1971, was the fourth child of William and Nora Walker (the siblings are, in birth order, Sarah, Kitty, Tommy, Kevin, and Justin). Kevin's first sexual experience was with a girl, Sarah Gimble, but by the next summer he had sex with a boy, Tucker Booth, at his family's ranch house (Tucker also took Sarah's virginity and was the first person to do drugs with Justin, but Kevin likely knew none of this). When Kevin was a senior in high school, he began seeing a boy named Danny G. McCullough. Danny's sister found out about the relationship and told Kitty. Kevin swore Kitty to secrecy, but by that Christmas she had told the other siblings. Kevin then told his mother, and she quickly joined PFLAG. Years later, Kevin would express some bitterness at how this had unfolded, saying he had felt like "an exchange student in his own home." He also reveals a crush he had on fellow student Matthew Brown; he joined everything Brown joined from Future Farmers of America (Brown apparently grew a prize-winning pumpkin) to the golf team. Kevin eventually became a successful lawyer, but failed to make partner. He was out to his family as well as to the legal world, but struggled with romantic relationships. Several years before the start of the show, Kevin was in a relationship with another man which ended with enough regret that Kevin kept a framed photo of the two of them in his office. Kevin also implied that in his past, he had had problems staying faithful in a relationship and slept around with other random men at times.

=== Kevin and Scotty ===
Along with the rest of the Walker family, Kevin's world was shaken when his father William suddenly died and was revealed as an embezzler and an adulterer. A heavy burden was often put on Kevin's shoulders, as he was the executor of his father's estate and his siblings also came to him for legal advice when they found out William had embezzled money from the company pension fund. Kevin, used to this role, offered few complaints, and seemed uninterested in a romantic relationship.

While working on a case, Kevin interviewed a key witness, Scotty Wandell (Luke Macfarlane). Scotty, who was more flamboyant than Kevin, quickly deduced Kevin's homosexuality and accused him of being ashamed and trying to "pass" for heterosexual. Kevin was irritated by Scotty's insinuations, but after Sarah invited Scotty to the Walker home for a pool party, Kevin began to let his guard down. He made a date with Scotty, but had to cancel when his mother Nora guilted him into accompanying her to a golf tournament. She changed her mind during the tournament and they went to the movies instead, where they ran into Scotty and a male companion, Randy Stewart (Ryan Eggold) holding hands. Later, Kevin confronted his mother for using him instead of allowing him to live his own life.

Soon after their run-in at the movies, Scotty dropped by Kevin's office and assured him the other man was only a friend. Kevin and Scotty went on their first date and bonded while talking about their backgrounds. When Scotty impulsively kissed Kevin during the meal, Kevin was put off. After they left the restaurant and Kevin remained distant, Scotty confronted Kevin about his shame of public displays of affection, putting down Kevin for his "internalized homophobia." Kevin insisted he was fine with himself and would object to the public kiss even if he were straight. The date ended on a sour note, but the next day, Scotty dropped by Kevin's apartment to apologize for being judgmental and to tell Kevin how much he got to Scotty. Kevin expressed relief that Scotty wasn't perfect and kissed him in front of a neighbor. After jokingly slamming the door in his face, Kevin pulled Scotty inside the apartment in order to take their relationship further.

When Scotty was unable to get off work to attend a charity benefit with Kevin, Kevin offered to pay Scotty's salary for the time he would miss. Scotty bristled at the idea of being "bought" by Kevin, and felt he was being made to feel inferior due to his social status. Coincidentally, Scotty turned out to be a waiter at the benefit. When a drunk Kevin apologized to him, they kissed and made up, but Scotty's boss fired him for putting his personal life before the job. Kevin threatened the boss with an anti-discrimination lawsuit unless he agreed to rehire Scotty, with a bigger salary. Kevin and Scotty made up.

When Kevin found out the family ranch house was about to be sold, he and Scotty decided to go for a weekend visit, not realizing the rest of his family had had the same idea. During the weekend, Kevin's brother Tommy, who had recently discovered his sterility, asked Kevin for his sperm in order to father a child with Tommy's wife Julia. Kevin turned him down. When Sarah found out she angrily confronted Kevin at the dinner table, and asked Scotty for his opinion. Kevin unthinkingly snapped that Scotty was not family and he should "shut up". He quickly apologized, but a hurt Scotty went home. Kevin confided to Kitty that he didn't want to bring a child into the world because he was afraid the child would be considered different for having a gay uncle and biological father, and face the kind of suffering he had faced. Kitty assured him the Walkers would never let anyone hurt the child, and Kevin (along with their other brother, Justin) agreed to be a sperm donor for Tommy and Julia. When Kevin got back to town, Scotty would no longer return his calls. Scotty dropped by the office to accept a settlement check, and Kevin joked that Scotty could take him to dinner since he was now on Kevin's financial level. A hurt Scotty said it had taken him a long time to accept himself, and in only two months, Kevin had made him feel worthless. He then told Kevin to rip up the check. Soon after, Kevin called Scotty and finally put his heart on the line. Scotty asked him for the check, and thanked him for the time they had spent together, but said the relationship was over. Kevin barely held his tears at bay as he ended the conversation.

Later events would have them reconnect (see below). They got engaged and Scotty's parents refused to go to the wedding. Scotty said he was ok with it, but Kevin felt bad, so his brothers talked him into going on a 5-hour road trip to talk to Scotty's parents and convince them to go.

=== Falling out with Kitty ===
After Kevin joined Tommy and Sarah on a road trip to track down the missing pension fund, their car broke down and they were stranded at a military bar. A soldier who flirted with Kevin at the bar agreed to let them stay at his place, and he had a one-night stand with Kevin in the process. They soon found the money their father had hidden away, and the family business was saved. The family harmony was strained when Kevin found out that Kitty was going to work for a senator (Rob Lowe) who had voted for a constitutional amendment to ban gay marriage. In the process, Kevin realized Kitty herself was opposed to gay marriage, although she supported civil unions. A stung Kevin grudgingly accepted her decision, but was infuriated when Kitty began seeing the senator socially. As a result, Kevin and Kitty became somewhat estranged for a time.

=== Kevin and Chad ===
Chad Barry (Jason Lewis), a handsome soap star, made the moves on Kevin. Even though Chad was closeted and had a girlfriend, a starstruck Kevin began a secret affair with Chad. In spite of his better judgment, Kevin developed feelings for Chad, telling Chad this was the first time he was the one who wanted the relationship more. When Kevin realized their relationship was never going to be more than a secret affair, he tried to end things, but Chad gave him an expensive watch and convinced Kevin he had feelings for him. Chad's girlfriend, Michelle, fixed Kevin up for a blind date. The date turned out to be Scotty, to the surprise of both men. Due to being jealous of Chad and Michelle, as well as still having strong feelings for Scotty, Kevin had sex with Scotty. The morning after, Chad called Kevin and asked if he'd had sex with Scotty. When Kevin implied he had, Chad claimed he would have broken up with Michelle but no longer had a reason to do so. Scotty, who overheard the conversation, asked Kevin if he'd slept with him to make Chad jealous. Kevin replied, "I don't know." A hurt Scotty said Kevin was now in the place he had been in with Kevin - loving someone who doesn't love themselves. He told Kevin he felt sorry for him, and sadly wished him good luck.

Although Chad was upset with Kevin, Chad soon began calling him again and asking him for another chance. Kevin was uninterested until Chad told him he'd broken up with Michelle. Kevin and Chad went out to dinner. After dinner, Michelle called Kevin to warn him that Chad was stringing him along and would hurt him the way he'd hurt other men and women. Kevin continued to be wary of Chad, but Chad convinced him of his desire for a real relationship.

A blogger, Dan Silk, began running stories on his site which exposed Chad's homosexuality (one being Kevin and Chad shopping for a lamp). Against Chad's wishes, Kevin called Silk and threatened him with a lawsuit. Silk responded by increasing his attacks against Chad. Chad told Kevin they would now have to be even more discreet and hidden away than before. Meanwhile, Kevin, Sarah, Tommy, and Saul decided not to tell Nora (Kevin's mother) that William (Kevin's father) had a long-lost daughter, Rebecca, by another woman, and that daughter was now back in town. Feeling guilty, Saul told Nora the truth, and the Walkers struggled with how to deal with their new addition.

At a family dinner for Rebecca, Kevin, skeptical as to whether or not she was really their sister, yanked a hair out of her head at the dinner table, causing her to flee the house. In his relationship with Chad, he almost convinced Chad to come out, but Chad's manager told him if Chad came out, Chad would totally depend on him and constantly cling to him, and Chad's career would be ruined. Kevin, wary of being too attached to Chad, convinced him not to come out. Shortly afterwards, Chad did come out, but no longer wanted to be in a relationship with Kevin.

=== Kevin and the McCallisters ===
While Kitty was working on her boyfriend Senator Robert McCallister's Presidential campaign, Kitty met his brother, Jason (Eric Winter). Kitty thought he was attractive, smart, witty and a good match for Kevin, and set them up for a date. Due to Kevin's antipathy towards Senator McCallister (due to his party status and views upon gay marriage), Kitty opted not to tell Kevin that Jason was Robert's brother. The two men had a good time on their date until Kevin began insulting Robert. Jason soon became offended and made up an excuse to leave early. When Kevin found out what Kitty had done, he was furious, but when she asked him for help, he used his legal expertise to stop a man who told her he planned to blackmail Robert over something he'd done while serving in the Persian Gulf War.

At the end of the season, Kevin met up with Jason again when they had to plan Kitty's and Robert's engagement party. After a few drinks and some banter, they made out in the pantry. To Kevin's shock, not long after the kiss he found out Jason was an ordained Methodist minister. As the party wound down, Jason told Kevin he was a traditional person. While Kevin was not entirely sure how he felt about Jason or the situation, he replied that he could use some tradition in his life.

At the start of the second season, it was indicated that Kevin and Jason were involved in a relationship. It was also announced that Jason would be leaving for Malaysia to serve as "missionary" for the impoverished people. While both Kevin and Jason told and shared their love and affections for each other, it was implied that their relationship would undergo some emotional strain. This marks a significance in Kevin Walker, as this is the first boyfriend that he has professed a love for, though it was not his first love declaration: his ex-boyfriend Scotty professed a love for him early on as did his ex-boyfriend Chad Barry.

=== Scotty Returns ===
While Kevin waited for Jason to return, he spent his time helping Sarah with her messy divorce and Justin with his painful recovery from war wounds. He was surprised when old flame Scotty showed up at his office for legal help. Scotty had been arrested for DUI and felt he was only charged because the arresting officer had a problem with his homosexuality. Kevin managed to have the case dismissed. (And get the officer who wrote the ticket reprimanded for discrimination.) As a thank you present, Scotty treated Kevin to a private dinner at the fancy restaurant where he worked as a cook. After the meal, Scotty nearly kissed Kevin before he stopped himself. Kevin somewhat nervously said that he had a boyfriend now. Scotty took this to mean that Kevin really had changed. Kevin left, but later returned to tell Scotty that they'd never had the chance to be friends, and he very much wanted to be Scotty's friend. Scotty was in the middle of a busy service, but told Kevin that was fine with him. When his tuition fee was due, Scotty could no longer afford his apartment, cell phone and insurance. Kevin invited Scotty to live with him. In the meantime, Kevin had not been talking to Jason for quite a while because Jason did not respond to Kevin's calls. Kevin felt emotionally lonely and also realized he still loved Scotty. One night, after a meal and champagne, he and Scotty slept together. A few days later, he finally got a call from Jason. He told Jason he had slept with Scotty and then broke up with Jason.

When Jason returned to town, he told Kevin he'd undergone a spiritual crisis and could not bring himself to call. Scotty arranged a meal between the three of them which turned tense. After a quarrel, Jason left, and Scotty moved into his car, as he assumed Kevin no longer wanted him around. The next morning, Kevin convinced him he wanted to continue the relationship.

=== Proposal and children ===
When Scotty cut himself badly and incurred large expenses because he had no health insurance, Kevin suggested they enter a domestic partnership so Scotty could share his coverage. Scotty, stung that Kevin only cared about practicality, rejected the idea.

Kevin had to help his various relatives through their complicated personal and professional crises. His uncle Saul called him for help after he drunkenly drove his car into a tree. Kevin and Saul had fallen out some months earlier because Kevin suspected Saul was gay (Scotty had seen him at gay dinner party he'd catered) but Saul had vehemently denied it. After Kevin picked him up, Saul despondently asked Kevin how a man Saul's age could deal with being gay. Kevin said it was difficult even at his own age.

The loneliness of Saul's life led Kevin to realize just how special his relationship with Scotty was. When he returned home, he proposed marriage (domestic partnership) to Scotty, even getting down on one knee. Scotty, moved by Kevin's words, happily said yes. As of the second season finale they are married.

In season 4, they decide to have children and ask Michelle to be their surrogate. After one failure, it is revealed in the finale that the second attempt worked. In season 5, we learn that Michelle had a miscarriage. At that point, Kevin and Scotty's marriage is nearly ruined when Kevin discovers that Scotty cheated on him, and because Kevin is having a very hard time with Robert's death. They put their desire for children on hold, until they reconcile and decide to adopt through the foster system. They meet 9-year-old Olivia at an adoption event, and she pretty much chooses them. After a rough start (and Olivia's brother coming back), they adopt her. Scotty then stumbles upon Michelle, who reacts oddly, and later they find out that she has a child, Daniel, and realize that she lied about her miscarriage. She eventually drops him off at Justin's, making Kevin and Scotty a family of 4. Olivia doesn't take it well at first, but all is well in the finale.

== Significance as a character ==
Although American network television had gay and lesbian characters in both daytime and prime time, many of those characters only made guest appearances, were minor in importance, or received little storyline beyond coming out or other struggles related to their sexuality. Kevin was the rare gay character who was already out both to his family and in the workplace. The stated goal of the show to treat Kevin as an equal to, no better or worse than, the straight characters received praise from critics such as Robert Bianco.

Kisses between men had been especially rare on network television; Melrose Place edited out a gay kiss, Dawson's Creek had a few small kisses every few seasons, Will & Grace (a show with two gay characters in major roles) was the rare exception and featured both gay kisses and relationships throughout its eight-year run, and thirtysomething faced loss of ad revenues due to airing a scene of two men lying in bed together. Desperate Housewives, which precedes Brothers & Sisters on ABC, previously featured kisses and bedroom scenes involving Bree's gay son Andrew. In the first season of Brothers & Sisters, Kevin had a number of kisses with his love interests, even kissing Scotty twice in the same episode ("Date Night"), and shared several bedroom scenes with Chad that clearly took place soon after sex. The lack of noticeable backlash from viewers or advertisers was hailed as a positive step in public acceptance of gay characters.

Kevin's commitment ceremony with Scotty, likewise, was only the ninth same-sex wedding ceremony ever presented on an American network television series, and the first one ever between series regulars. All prior same-sex weddings on American network television, including on Roseanne, Roc, The Drew Carey Show, Spin City, Friends, The Simpsons, Family Guy and Northern Exposure, involved minor recurring or guest characters.

David Marshall Grant, one of the actors in the controversial thirtysomething scene, is a writer for Brothers & Sisters.

== Evolution ==
In the first pilot, Kevin was named Bryan, a prosecutor played by Jonathan LaPaglia, and gearing up for a custody battle with the ex-wife he left after coming out of the closet. With the second pilot, the character was retooled into a character who had already been out of the closet and living as an openly gay man for years, and recast with Matthew Rhys.
