= List of Brothers & Sisters episodes =

Brothers & Sisters is a family drama that premiered on ABC on September 24, 2006, and concluded on May 8, 2011. A total of 109 episodes of Brothers & Sisters aired over five seasons.

== Series overview ==
Season	Episodes	Originally released		Rank	Rating
Season	Episodes	First released	Last released	Rank	Rating
1	23	September 24, 2006	May 20, 2007	37	7.3
2	16	September 30, 2007	May 11, 2008	38	7.6
3	24	September 28, 2008	May 10, 2009	33	7.2
4	24	September 27, 2009	May 16, 2010	34	7.0
5	22	September 26, 2010	May 8, 2011	52	5.6

== Episodes ==
=== Season 1 (2006–07) ===
No. overall	No. in season	Title	Directed by	Written by	Original release date	US viewers (millions)
1	1	"Patriarchy"	Ken Olin	Jon Robin Baitz	September 24, 2006	15.69
2	2	"An Act of Will"	Matt Shakman	Jon Robin Baitz & Marti Noxon	October 1, 2006	13.46
3	3	"Affairs of State"	Tucker Gates	Jon Robin Baitz & Emily Whitesell & Craig Wright	October 8, 2006	13.01
4	4	"Family Portrait"	Ken Olin	Jon Robin Baitz & Craig Wright	October 15, 2006	12.15
5	5	"Date Night"	Allison Liddi-Brown	David Marshall Grant & Molly Newman	October 22, 2006	11.92
6	6	"For the Children"	Frederick E. O. Toye	Jon Robin Baitz & Jessica Mecklenburg	October 29, 2006	12.50
7	7	"Northern Exposure"	Lawrence Trilling	David Marshall Grant & Molly Newman	November 5, 2006	13.53
8	8	"Mistakes Were Made (Part 1)"	Michael Lange	Jon Robin Baitz & Craig Wright	November 12, 2006	12.78
9	9	"Mistakes Were Made (Part 2)"	Ken Olin	Marc Guggenheim & Greg Berlanti	November 19, 2006	13.04
10	10	"Light the Lights"	Frederick E. O. Toye	Peter Calloway & Cliff Olin	December 10, 2006	10.40
11	11	"Family Day"	David Petrarca	David Marshall Grant & Molly Newman	January 7, 2007	11.87
12	12	"Sexual Politics"	Sandy Smolan	Monica Owusu-Breen & Alison Schapker	January 14, 2007	12.32
13	13	"Something Ida This Way Comes"	Michael Lange	David Marshall Grant & Sherri Cooper-Landsman	January 21, 2007	11.79
14	14	"Valentine’s Day Massacre"	Michael Schultz	Peter Calloway & Cliff Olin	February 11, 2007	11.02
15	15	"Love is Difficult"	Michael Lange	Jon Robin Baitz & Molly Newman	February 18, 2007	11.28
16	16	"The Other Walker"	Gloria Muzio	Monica Owusu-Breen & Alison Schapker	March 4, 2007	11.60
17	17	"All in the Family"	David Paymer	Sherri Cooper-Landsman & David Marshall Grant	April 1, 2007	9.15
18	18	"Three Parties"	Sandy Smolan	Jon Robin Baitz & Marc Guggenheim	April 8, 2007	10.80
19	19	"Game Night"	Matt Shakman	Story by : Peter Calloway & Cliff Olin; Teleplay by : Molly Newman	April 15, 2007	11.26
20	20	"Bad News"	Jason Moore	Monica Owusu-Breen & Alison Schapker	April 29, 2007	11.15
21	21	"Grapes of Wrath"	Michael Morris	Sherri Cooper-Landsman & David Marshall Grant	May 6, 2007	10.83
22	22	"Favorite Son"	Gloria Muzio	Benjamin Kruger & Daniel Silk	May 13, 2007	11.61
23	23	"Matriarchy"	Ken Olin	Greg Berlanti & Jon Robin Baitz	May 20, 2007	12.31

=== Season 2 (2007–08) ===
No. overall	No. in season	Title	Directed by	Written by	Original release date	US viewers (millions)
24	1	"Home Front"	Ken Olin	Monica Owusu-Breen & Alison Schapker	September 30, 2007	12.83
25	2	"An American Family"	Gloria Muzio	David Marshall Grant & Molly Newman	October 7, 2007	11.91
26	3	"History Repeating"	Matt Shakman	Jon Robin Baitz & Jennifer Cecil	October 14, 2007	12.51
27	4	"States of Union"	Michael Schultz	Sherri Cooper-Landsman & Liz Tigelaar	October 21, 2007	11.54
28	5	"Domestic Issues"	Ken Olin	Peter Calloway & Cliff Olin	October 28, 2007	12.59
29	6	"Two Places"	Gloria Muzio	Monica Owusu-Breen & Alison Schapker	November 4, 2007	12.09
30	7	"36 Hours"	David Paymer	Molly Newman & David Marshall Grant	November 11, 2007	12.35
31	8	"Something New"	Michael Morris	Jennifer Cecil & Sherri Cooper-Landsman	November 25, 2007	12.25
32	9	"Holy Matrimony"	Robert Lieberman	Mark B. Perry and Monica Owusu-Breen & Alison Schapker	December 2, 2007	12.56
33	10	"The Feast of the Epiphany"	Laura Innes	David Marshall Grant & Jason Wilborn	January 13, 2008	10.90
34	11	"The Missionary Imposition"	Michael Morris	Daniel Silk & Brian Studler	February 10, 2008	8.63
35	12	"Compromises"	David Paymer	Cliff Olin & Peter Calloway	February 17, 2008	8.50
36	13	"Separation Anxiety"	Gloria Muzio	David Marshall Grant & Molly Newman	April 20, 2008	10.09
37	14	"Double Negative"	Michael Schultz	Josh Reims & Liz Tigelaar	April 27, 2008	11.19
38	15	"Moral Hazard"	Michael Morris	Sherri Cooper-Landsman & Jason Wilborn	May 4, 2008	10.46
39	16	"Prior Commitments"	Ken Olin	Greg Berlanti & Monica Owusu-Breen & Alison Schapker	May 11, 2008	10.69

=== Season 3 (2008–09) ===
No. overall	No. in season	Title	Directed by	Written by	Original release date	US viewers (millions)
40	1	"Glass Houses"	Tucker Gates	Molly Newman & David Marshall Grant	September 28, 2008	12.03
41	2	"Book Burning"	Laura Innes	Sherri Cooper & Jennifer Levin	October 5, 2008	10.33
42	3	"Tug of War"	Gloria Muzio	Josh Reims & Liz Tigelaar	October 12, 2008	9.90
43	4	"Everything Must Go"	Michael Schultz	Nancy Won & Michael Foley	October 19, 2008	9.82
44	5	"You Get What You Need"	Chad Lowe	David Marshall Grant & Cliff Olin	October 26, 2008	9.86
45	6	"Bakersfield"	Gloria Muzio	Molly Newman & Peter Calloway	November 2, 2008	9.62
46	7	"Do You Believe in Magic"	Michael Morris	Sherri Cooper-Landsman & Jennifer Levin	November 9, 2008	10.11
47	8	"Going Once...Going Twice"	Karen Gaviola	Brian Studler & Beth Schwartz	November 16, 2008	10.00
48	9	"Unfinished Business"	Michael Morris	Jason Wilborn & Nancy Won	November 30, 2008	10.07
49	10	"Just a Sliver"	Michael Schultz	Molly Newman & David Marshall Grant	December 7, 2008	10.55
50	11	"A Father Dreams"	Tom Amandes	Jennifer Levin & Michael Foley	January 4, 2009	9.09
51	12	"Sibling Rivalry"	Jeff Melman	Liz Tigelaar & Josh Reims	January 11, 2009	8.97
52	13	"It's Not Easy Being Green"	Laura Innes	Peter Calloway & Sherri Cooper	January 18, 2009	8.87
53	14	"Owning It"	Bethany Rooney	Cliff Olin & David Marshall Grant	February 8, 2009	9.26
54	15	"Lost and Found"	David Paymer	Michael Foley & Jennifer Levin	February 15, 2009	9.00
55	16	"Troubled Waters"	Ken Olin	Monica Owusu-Breen & Sherri Cooper-Landsman	March 1, 2009	11.98
56	17	"Troubled Waters"	Ken Olin	David Marshall Grant & Molly Newman	March 1, 2009	11.98
57	18	"Taking Sides"	Michael Morris	Michael Foley & Beth Schwartz	March 8, 2009	10.32
58	19	"Spring Broken"	Richard Coad	Sherri Cooper-Landsman & Brian Studler	March 15, 2009	10.44
59	20	"Missing"	Michael Schultz	Jason Wilborn & Nancy Won	March 22, 2009	10.15
60	21	"S3X"	Laura Innes	Cliff Olin & David Marshall Grant	April 19, 2009	9.46
61	22	"Julia"	Michael Morris	Molly Newman & Michael Foley	April 26, 2009	9.31
62	23	"Let's Call The Whole Thing Off"	Laura Innes	Peter Calloway & Daniel Silk	May 3, 2009	9.11
63	24	"Mexico"	Ken Olin	Alison Schapker & Monica Owusu-Breen	May 10, 2009	8.75

=== Season 4 (2009–10) ===
No. overall	No. in season	Title	Directed by	Written by	Original release date	US viewers (millions)
64	1	"The Road Ahead"	Ken Olin	Molly Newman & Marjorie David	September 27, 2009	9.38
65	2	"Breaking the News"	Ken Olin	David Marshall Grant & Cliff Olin	October 4, 2009	9.65
66	3	"Almost Normal"	Michael Schultz	Jennifer Levin & Sherri Cooper-Landsman	October 11, 2009	8.97
67	4	"From France With Love"	Michael Morris	Sarah Goldfinger & Michael Foley	October 18, 2009	9.72
68	5	"Last Tango in Pasadena"	Bethany Rooney	Molly Newman & Jason Wilborn	October 25, 2009	9.97
69	6	"Zen & the Art of Making Mole"	Michael Schultz	Brian Studler & Geoffrey Nauffts	November 1, 2009	9.47
70	7	"The Wig Party"	Ken Olin	Marjorie David & David Marshall Grant	November 8, 2009	9.08
71	8	"The Wine Festival"	Michael Morris	Sherri Cooper-Landsman & Michael Foley	November 15, 2009	10.08
72	9	"Pregnant Pause"	Matthew Rhys	Sarah Goldfinger & Jennifer Levin	November 29, 2009	8.69
73	10	"Nearlyweds"	Laura Innes	Michael J. Cinquemani & Molly Newman	December 6, 2009	10.81
74	11	"A Bone to Pick"	Chad Lowe	Cliff Olin & Brian Studler	January 3, 2010	10.78
75	12	"The Science Fair"	Laura Innes	Monica Owusu-Breen & Alison Schapker	January 10, 2010	10.45
76	13	"Run Baby Run"	Richard Coad	Marjorie David & Jason Wilborn	January 17, 2010	7.97
77	14	"The Pasadena Primary"	Jonathan Kaplan	Michael Foley & Geoffrey Nauftts	January 31, 2010	7.65
78	15	"A Valued Family"	Michael Schultz	Sarah Goldfinger & Michael Cinquemani	February 21, 2010	7.85
79	16	"Leap of Faith"	Michael Morris	Matt Donnelly & Marc Halsey	February 28, 2010	7.92
80	17	"Freeluc.com"	Bethany Rooney	Molly Newman & Brian Studler	March 14, 2010	8.53
81	18	"Time After Time"	Ken Olin	Sherri Cooper-Landsman & Jennifer Levin	April 11, 2010	8.84
82	19	"Time After Time"	Ken Olin	Alison Schapker & Monica Owusu-Breen	April 11, 2010	8.84
83	20	"If You Bake It He Will Come"	Bethany Rooney	Marjorie David & Cliff Olin	April 18, 2010	7.84
84	21	"Where There's Smoke..."	Michael Morris	Michael Foley & Jason Wilborn	April 25, 2010	8.36
85	22	"Love All"	Michael Schultz	Michael J. Cinquemani & Sarah Goldfinger	May 2, 2010	8.44
86	23	"Lights Out"	Michael Morris	Molly Newman & Brian Studler	May 9, 2010	8.18
87	24	"On The Road Again"	Ken Olin	David Marshall Grant & Geoffrey Nauffts	May 16, 2010	9.93

=== Season 5 (2010–11) ===
No. overall	No. in season	Title	Directed by	Written by	Original release date	US viewers (millions)
88	1	"Homecoming"	Michael Morris	David Marshall Grant & David Babcock	September 26, 2010	9.49
89	2	"Brief Encounter"	Jonathan Kaplan	Molly Newman	October 3, 2010	9.17
90	3	"Faking It"	Michael Schultz	Veronica Becker & Geoffrey Nauffts	October 10, 2010	8.90
91	4	"A Righteous Kiss"	Ken Olin	Cliff Olin & Stephen Tolkin	October 17, 2010	8.81
92	5	"Call Mom"	Michael Schultz	Veronica Becker & Brian Studler	October 24, 2010	8.21
93	6	"An Ideal Husband"	Bethany Rooney	David Marshall Grant & Michael J. Cinquemani	October 31, 2010	8.15
94	7	"Resolved"	Michael Schultz	David Babcock & Gina Lucita Monreal	November 7, 2010	8.70
95	8	"The Rhapsody Of The Flesh"	Matthew Rhys	Molly Newman	November 14, 2010	8.69
96	9	"Get A Room"	Eli Craig	Marc Halsey & Matt Donnelly	December 5, 2010	7.59
97	10	"Cold Turkey"	Michael Morris	Stephen Tolkin & Geoffrey Nauffts	December 12, 2010	8.76
98	11	"Scandalized"	Bethany Rooney	Veronica Becker & Sarah Kucserka	January 2, 2011	7.85
99	12	"Thanks For The Memories"	Michael Mayers	Cliff Olin & Brian Studler	January 9, 2011	8.25
100	13	"Safe At Home"	Richard Coad	Michael J. Cinquemani & John Kazlauskas	January 16, 2011	7.07
101	14	"The One That Got Away"	Michael Morris	Gina Lucia Monreal & David Babcock	February 13, 2011	6.27
102	15	"Brody"	Matthew Rhys	Molly Newman	February 20, 2011	6.77
103	16	"Home Is Where the Fort Is"	Bethany Rooney	Geoffrey Nauffts & Brian Studler	March 6, 2011	7.37
104	17	"Olivia's Choice"	Michael Morris	Cliff Olin & Stephen Tolkin	April 10, 2011	6.59
105	18	"Never Say Never"	Bethany Rooney	Sarah Kucserka & Veronica Becker	April 10, 2011	6.43
106	19	"Wouldn't It Be Nice"	Ken Olin	Michael J. Cinquemani & Marc Halsey	April 17, 2011	6.32
107	20	"Father Unknown"	Matthew Rhys	Molly Newman & Gina Lucita Monreal	April 24, 2011	6.55
108	21	"For Better or for Worse"	Michael Morris	Stephen Tolkin & Matt Donnelly	May 1, 2011 (Note: This episode was interrupted on the east coast and pre-empted on the west coast due to the Osama bin Laden death coverage and was never rebroadcast.)	5.70
109	22	"Walker Down the Aisle"	Ken Olin	David Marshall Grant & David Babcock	May 8, 2011	7.18
