= Matthew Rhys =

Welsh actor (born 1974)

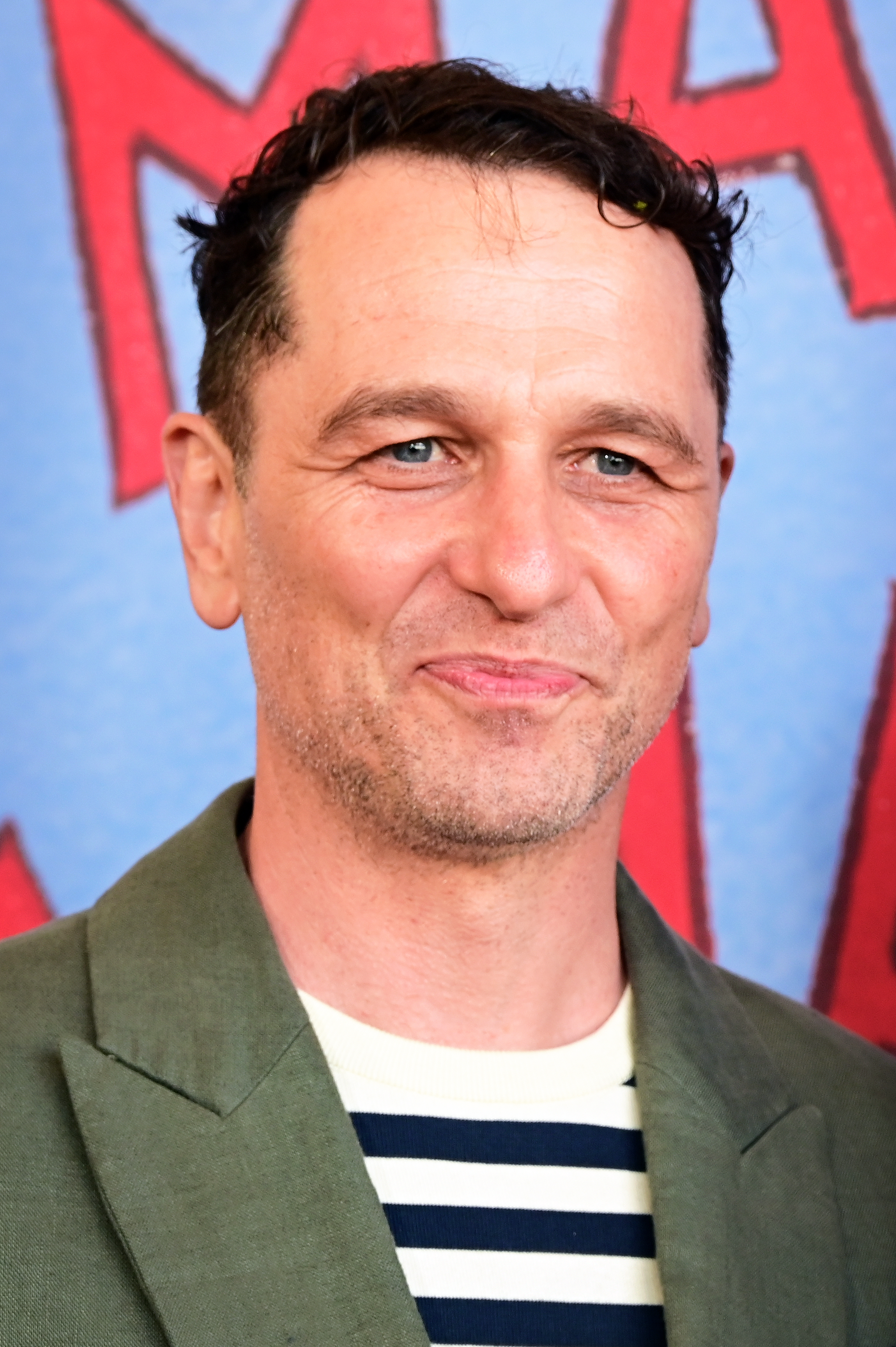
- Rhys in 2026
- Born: 8 November 1974 (age 52); Cardiff, Wales
- Education: Royal Academy of Dramatic Art
- Occupation: Actor
- Years active: 1997–present
- Partner: Keri Russell (2014–present)
- Children: 1

Matthew Rhys (/riːs/ REESS; born 8 November 1974) is a Welsh actor. Known for portraying morally complex protagonists, he has received various accolades including four Primetime Emmy Awards, becoming the first and only actor to win in all three Lead Actor categories in Emmys history. He has also been nominated for two Actor Awards, two BAFTAs, and four Golden Globe Awards.

Rhys gained recognition for playing Kevin Walker in the family drama series Brothers & Sisters (2006–2011) and Philip Jennings in the spy drama series The Americans (2013–2018); he earned the Primetime Emmy Award for Outstanding Lead Actor in a Drama Series in 2018 for his work on The Americans. He earned Emmy nominations for his roles in the comedy series Girls (2017) and the mystery series Perry Mason (2020–2023). At the 2026 Primetime Emmy Awards, he was a three-time winner: Outstanding Lead Actor in a Limited or Anthology Series or Movie for the crime thriller The Beast in Me (2025), and Outstanding Lead Actor in a Comedy Series and Outstanding Comedy Series (as an executive producer) for the comedy-horror series Widow's Bay (since 2026).

In film, Rhys appeared as Demetrius in Titus (1999), Doc Fairweather in Deathwatch (2002), Dylan Thomas in The Edge of Love (2008), Daniel Ellsberg in The Post (2017), and Lloyd Vogel in A Beautiful Day in the Neighborhood (2019). He has also voiced several characters in animated series, including Aloysius in Infinity Train (2019), Emperor Belos in The Owl House (2020–2023), Riley Greene in Gremlins: Secrets of the Mogwai (2023), and Gammon Felda / the Florid Sword in The Wingfeather Saga (2024–present).

== Early life and education ==
Matthew Rhys was born in Cardiff, Wales, on 8 November 1974. (Note: Allmovie says 4 November) He grew up in Cardiff with his older sister and attended Welsh-medium schools, Ysgol Gynradd Gymraeg Melin Gruffydd (in Whitchurch, Cardiff) and Ysgol Gyfun Gymraeg Glantaf (in Llandaff North, Cardiff). In 1993, he was awarded the Patricia Rothermere Scholarship.

At age 17, after playing Elvis Presley in a school musical, he applied to and was accepted at the Royal Academy of Dramatic Art (RADA) in London. During Rhys's time at RADA, he appeared in the BBC police series Backup and in House of America. He returned to Cardiff to act in his own language in the Welsh film Bydd yn Wrol (Be Brave), for which he won Best Actor at the BAFTA Cymru (Welsh BAFTAs).

== Career ==
=== 1996–2012: Early roles and Brothers & Sisters ===
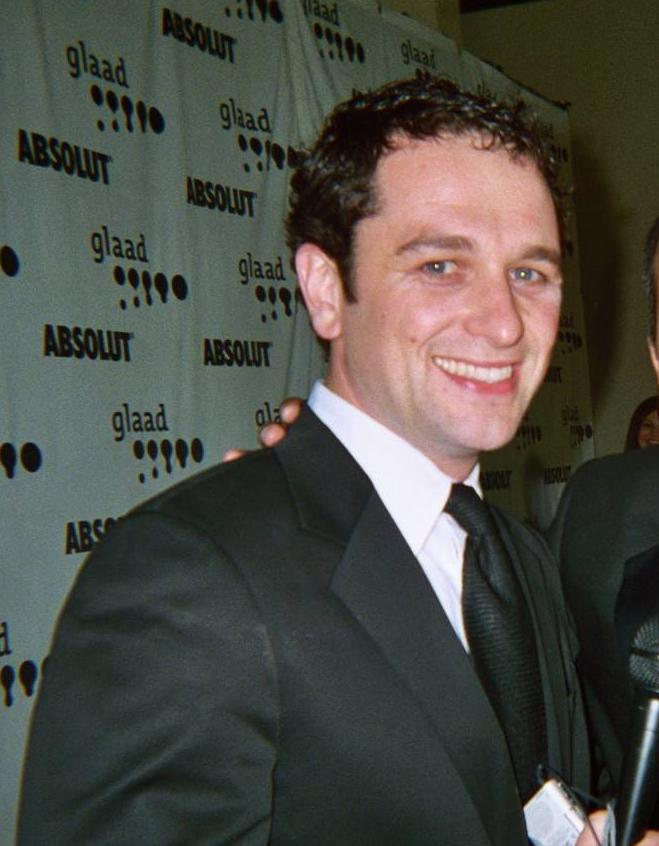
Rhys at the 2007 GLAAD Awards

In January 1998, Rhys went to New Zealand to star in Greenstone, a colonial costume drama for television. He then landed a role in Titus, Julie Taymor's adaptation of Titus Andronicus, starring Anthony Hopkins and Jessica Lange. Next he played Ray in Peter Hewitt's comedy film Whatever Happened to Harold Smith? After returning to Wales, he did two consecutive films with Jonathan Pryce: The Testimony of Taliesin Jones, a film about a dysfunctional single-parent family in which he played the elder son, and Sara Sugarman's comedy Very Annie Mary, in which he played the role of Nob. Rhys would later reunite with Very Annie Mary star Rachel Griffiths on Brothers & Sisters.

In 2000, Rhys played the lead role in Metropolis, a drama series for Granada TV about the lives of six twenty-somethings living in London. Next he starred in Peaches, the film of the play written and directed by Nick Grosso. Rhys starred as Benjamin in the 2000 world premiere of the stage adaptation of The Graduate, alongside Kathleen Turner at the Gielgud Theatre in London's West End. Rhys travelled to Ireland to star in the 18th-century swashbuckling adventure The Abduction Club. He played the lead role of Darren Daniels in Tabloid and then returned to New Zealand to shoot the epic drama The Lost World for the BBC. His other film credits include the independent horror film Deathwatch in Prague and Fakers, a comic crime caper.

In 2003, he played Justin Price in the final episode of the long-running television series Columbo. He appeared in the independent feature Love and Other Disasters, in Virgin Territory, and as poet Dylan Thomas in the love quadrangle biographical film The Edge of Love. He moved to the United States, to Santa Monica after being cast in ABC's show Brothers & Sisters as gay lawyer Kevin Walker. The show had a five-season run, coming to an end in 2011.

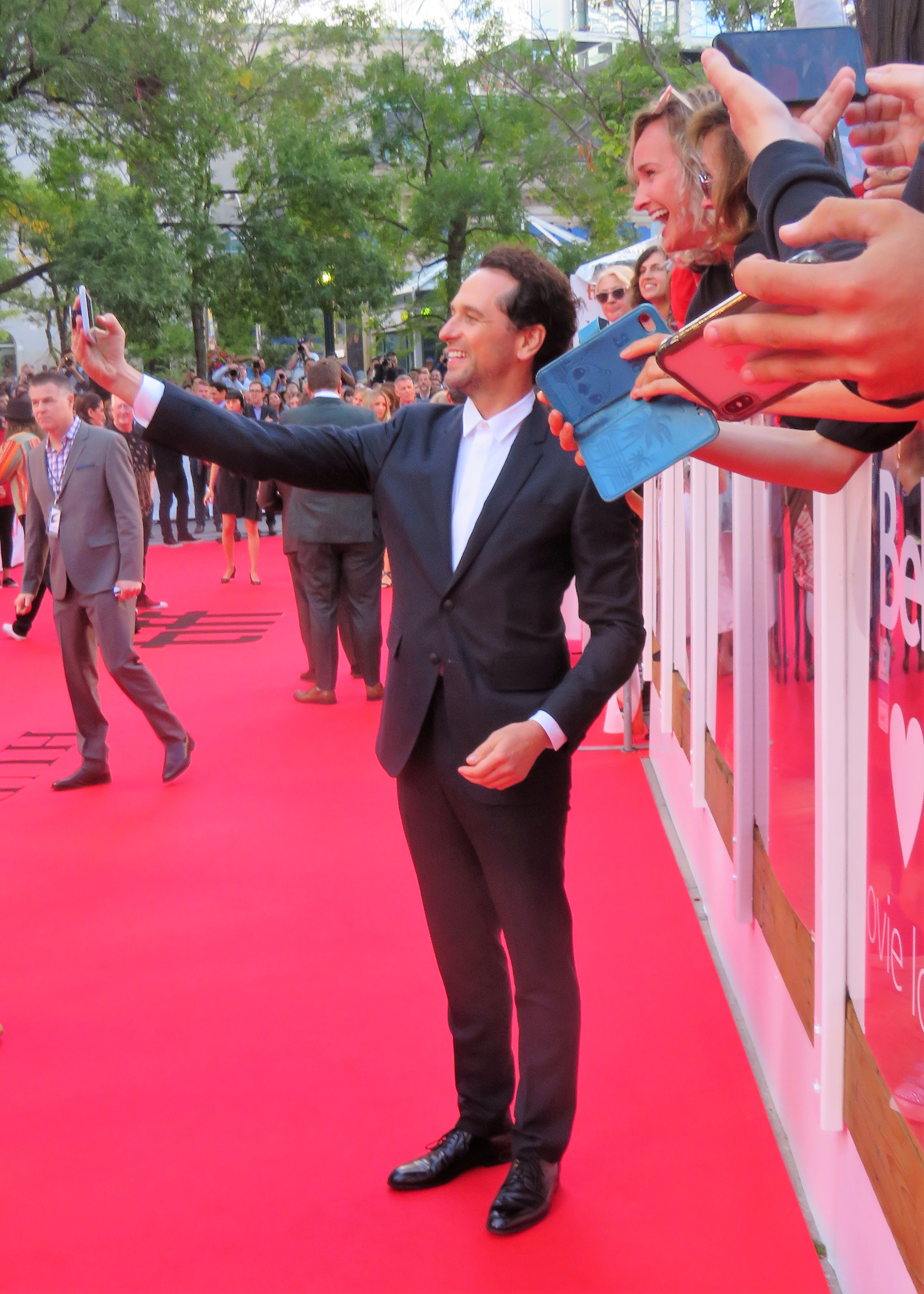
A Beautiful Day in the Neighborhood premiere, Toronto Film Festival, 2019

In January 2012, Rhys appeared in a BBC Two two-part drama adaptation of Charles Dickens's last, unfinished novel, The Mystery of Edwin Drood. The Public Broadcasting Service (PBS) aired it in the United States as one feature-length episode on 15 April 2012. In 2012, Rhys reprised Sir Alec Guinness's 1959 double role of John Barratt / Jacques DeGué in a new adaptation of Daphne du Maurier's The Scapegoat. That same year, Rhys was cast as Jimmy in the Roundabout Theatre Company's Off-Broadway revival of John Osborne's play, Look Back in Anger, at the Laura Pels Theatre in the Harold and Miriam Steinberg Center for Theatre. The production played a limited engagement through 8 April 2012.

=== 2013–2019: The Americans and acclaim ===
Rhys starred opposite his future partner Keri Russell in the FX series The Americans, a 1980s Cold War spy drama about Russian KGB sleeper agents. The show debuted in January 2013 and aired its sixth and final season in 2018. Rhys received a Primetime Emmy Award for his acting in the sixth season. In 2013, Rhys starred in the television adaptation of the P. D. James novel Death Comes to Pemberley as Jane Austen hero Fitzwilliam Darcy. He appeared as Daniel Ellsberg in the Steven Spielberg film The Post in 2017. The same year, he made a guest appearance on the HBO series Girls, for which he received a Primetime Emmy Award nomination.

In 2019, he starred in Marielle Heller's A Beautiful Day in the Neighborhood. Rhys's character was based on the journalist Tom Junod, who skeptically profiled Fred Rogers for Esquire in the 1990s. To prepare for the role, Rhys worked with Junod to explore how he would approach the interview. Critics praised the performance, with Ian Freer writing for Empire that Rhys acted "with a burning-eyed intensity, perfectly render[ing] a man who can't quite make a leap to forgiveness".

=== 2020–present: Television expansion ===
From 2020 to 2023, Rhys starred in the HBO series Perry Mason. In 2025, Rhys starred as one of the lead characters, Nile Jarvis, a morally complex character, in Netflix's eight-part miniseries The Beast in Me. From 16 to 28 November 2025, he returned to the Welsh stage to play Richard Burton in the one-man play Playing Burton, celebrating the 100th anniversary of Burton's birth and raising funds for the inaugural season of Michael Sheen's new Welsh National Theatre. He received positive reviews from critics for his performance as Burton.

In 2026, Rhys voiced the character of Dinosaurus in the fourth season of Invincible and began starring in the Apple TV comedy-horror series Widow's Bay. At the 78th Primetime Emmy Awards, Rhys won Outstanding Lead Actor in a Limited or Anthology Series or Movie for The Beast in Me and Outstanding Lead Actor in a Comedy Series for Widow's Bay, making him the first actor to win two lead acting Emmys in one night, and the first actor to win Emmys as a lead in the comedy, drama, and limited or anthology series or movie categories.

In May 2026, it was reported that he will serve as an executive producer, as well as appear onscreen as Harold Evans, for the BBC series Dragon Slayers, which is expected to start filming by September 2026 in Manchester.

Rhys will voice the character Han Solo in Star Wars: Episode IV - A New Hope, which is to be dubbed into Welsh for the first time as the film prepares to celebrate its 50th anniversary in 2027.

== Business ventures ==
=== Patagonia productions ===
Rhys set up his own production company, Patagonia, in 2011. It has two projects in development. One of them involves an adaptation of a book titled Operation Julie, written by Lyn Ebenezer, about the biggest LSD busts in Wales's history; Rhys bought the film rights in December 2010. In 2023, Rhys spoke on a podcast about how he has been working on a potential film about Owain Glyndŵr's life and his rebellion, begun in 1400, against the Kingdom of England.

=== Pubs ===
With the help of fellow Welsh actor Rhys Ifans, Rhys supported fundraising for the Vale of Aeron pub in Ystrad Aeron. Rhys also invested in another pub in Pennal, a town in Gwynedd, North Wales, where his father grew up and Rhys would spend summers and Easters visiting. In 2019, the Glan Yr Afon (also Riverside) was put on the market without any buyers, but through a campaign supported by Rhys, there was a shares offering for the public which raised £450,000 to save the pub. The local community completed the purchase in December 2022.

=== Charter yacht ===
In New York City, Rhys owns and rents out a charter boat named Rarebit. The Wheeler boat was constructed circa 1934; Rhys bought it from eBay in 2017. He rebuilt the boat himself with the advice of shipwrights.

== Personal life ==
Rhys has been in a relationship with his The Americans co-star Keri Russell since 2014. They had their first child, a son, in 2016. In interviews conducted in 2021, they referred to each other as husband and wife, though Rhys stated in an interview in March 2025 that they "literally haven't got round to marriage yet". The family lives together in Brooklyn along with Russell's two older children from a previous relationship.

He is a supporter of Plaid Cymru and has spoken out in favour of Welsh independence. Rhys stated in November 2018 that he spoke to his son "only in Welsh", adding that he wants his son to understand the language.

On 15 July 2008, Aberystwyth University honoured Rhys as a fellow. On 8 August 2008, he was honoured at the Welsh National Eisteddfod by being accepted as a member to the druidic order of the Gorsedd of the Bards for his contributions to the Welsh language and Wales. His bardic name in the Gorsedd is Matthew Tâf. In August 2009, Rhys took to the stage with the National Youth Orchestra of Wales as part of the National Eisteddfod.

== Acting credits ==
=== Film ===
Year	Title	Role	Notes
1996	Bydd yn Wrol	N/A	
1997	House of America	Boyo	
1999	Heart	Sean McCardle	
1999	Whatever Happened to Harold Smith?	Ray Smith	
1999	Titus	Demetrius	
2000	Sorted	Carl	
2000	The Testimony of Taliesin Jones	Jonathan	
2001	Peaches	Frank	
2001	Very Annie Mary	Nob	
2001	Tabloid	Darren Daniels	
2002	Shooters	Eddie	
2002	The Abduction Club	James Strang	
2002	Deathwatch	Doc Fairweather	
2003	Y Mabinogi	Lleu Llaw Gyffes	
2004	Fakers	Nick Edwards	
2006	Love and Other Disasters	Peter Simon	
2007	Virgin Territory	Count Dzerzhinsky	
2008	The Edge of Love	Dylan Thomas	
2010	Luster	Joseph Miller	
2010	Patagonia	Mateo	
2012	The Scapegoat	John Standing / Johnny Spence	
2015	Come What May	Percy	
2015	Burnt	Montgomery Reece	
2017	The Post	Daniel Ellsberg	
2018	Mowgli: Legend of the Jungle	John Lockwood	
2019	The Report	New York Times reporter	
2019	A Beautiful Day in the Neighborhood	Lloyd Vogel	
2021	Seal Team	Grimes (voice)	
2023	Cocaine Bear	Andrew C. Thornton II	
2024	IF	Ghost (voice)	
2024	Watchmen	Dan Dreiberg / Nite Owl, additional voices	Direct-to-video
2024	Saturday Night	George Carlin	
2025	Hallow Road	Frank	
2026	Star Wars: Gobaith Newydd	Han Solo	Welsh dub of Star Wars: Episode IV – A New Hope

=== Television ===
Key
†	Denotes television productions that have not yet been released

Year	Title	Role	Notes
1997	Backup	PC Steve "Hiccup" Higson	Recurring role (season 2)
1999	Greenstone	Sam Markham	Unknown episodes
2000	A History of Britain	N/A	Unknown episodes
2000	Metropolis	Matthew Bishop	Main role
2001	The Lost World	Edward Malone	2 episodes
2003	Columbo	Justin Price	Episode: "Columbo Likes the Nightlife"
2003	Partners and Crime	N/A	Television film
2003	POW	Alfie Harris	Episode #1.5
2006	Beau Brummell: This Charming Man	Lord Byron	Television film
2006–2011	Brothers & Sisters	Kevin Walker	Main role
2010	Mr Hollywood	—	Producer; S4C-TV documentary
2011	LA Phil Live	Hamlet	Episode: "Dudamel Conducts Tchiakovsky"
2012	The Mystery of Edwin Drood	John Jasper	2 episodes
2013	Death Comes to Pemberley	Fitzwilliam Darcy	3 episodes
2013–2018	The Americans	Philip Jennings	Main role
2014	Under Milk Wood	New York Voice	Television film
2015	Archer	Lloyd Llewellyn (voice)	Episode: "Achub y Morfilod"; credited for episode's story
2015	The Bastard Executioner	Gruffudd y Blaidd / the Wolf	Special guest star
2016–2020	The Wine Show	Himself (co-host)	Main role
2017	Girls	Chuck Palmer	Episode: "American Bitch"
2017	Snowdonia 1890	Narrator	Main role
2018	Death and Nightingales	Billy	3 episodes
2018	Down the Caravan	Dai	Television film
2019	BoJack Horseman	Justin Kenyon (voice)	Episode: "A Quick One, While He's Away"
2019	Carpool Karaoke: The Series	Himself (co-host)	Season 2, episode 17
2019	Infinity Train	Aloysius, Alrick (voice)	2 episodes
2020–2023	Perry Mason	Perry Mason	Main role; also executive producer
2020–2023	The Owl House	Emperor Belos (voice)	Recurring role
2022	Tuca & Bertie	Figgy (voice)	6 episodes
2023	Extrapolations	Junior	Episode: "2037: A Raven Story"
2023	Gremlins	Riley Greene (voice)	10 episodes
2024–2025	The Wingfeather Saga	Gammon Felda / the Florid Sword (voice)	Recurring role (season 2-3)
2025	Towards Zero	Inspector Leach	Three-part miniseries
2025	Family Guy	Drizzleton Man (voice)	Episode: "A Little Fright Music"
2025	The Beast in Me	Nile Jarvis	Main role; miniseries
2025	The American Revolution	Thomas Paine (voice)	Six-part docuseries
2026	Invincible	Dinosaurus / David Anders (voice)	Episode: "Making the World a Better Place"
2026	Golden Axe	Gilius Thunderhead (voice)	Main role
2026–present	Widow's Bay	Tom Loftis	Main role; also executive producer
TBA	Presumed Innocent †	TBA	Filming; main cast (season 2)

=== Theatre ===
Year	Play	Role	Playwright	Venue	Ref.
1997	Cardiff East	Tommy	Peter Gill	Royal National Theatre	
1997	Grace Note	Nick	Samuel Adamson	The Old Vic	
1997	One More Wasted Year	Pierre	Christophe Pellet	Royal Court Theatre	
1997	Stranger's House (Fremdes Haus)	Yanne	Dea Loher	Royal Court Theatre	
2000	The Graduate	Benjamin Braddock	Charles Webb	Gielgud Theatre	
2002	The Associate	Tiny	Simon Bent	Royal National Theatre	
2003	Under Milk Wood	Mog Edwards	Dylan Thomas	New Theatre (Cardiff)	
2004	King Lear	Edmund	William Shakespeare	Royal Shakespeare Company	
2004	Macbeth	Macduff	William Shakespeare	The Young Vic	
2004	Romeo and Juliet	Romeo	William Shakespeare	Royal Shakespeare Company	
2012	Look Back in Anger	Jimmy	John Osborne	Roundabout Theatre Company	
2025	Playing Burton	Richard Burton	Mark Jenkins	Welsh National Theatre	

== Awards and nominations ==
Award	Year	Category	Nominated work	Result	Ref.
Actor Awards	2019	Outstanding Ensemble in a Drama Series	The Americans	Nominated	
Actor Awards	2026	Outstanding Actor in a Miniseries or Television Movie	The Beast in Me	Nominated	
Astra TV Awards	2021	Best Actor in a Broadcast Network or Cable Series, Drama	Perry Mason	Nominated	
Astra TV Awards	2026	Best Actor in a Limited Series or TV Movie	The Beast in Me	Nominated	
BAFTA Cymru Awards	2009	Best Actor	The Edge of Love	Nominated	
BAFTA Cymru Awards	2011	Sian Phillips Award	—	Honored	
BAFTA Cymru Awards	2019	Best Actor	Death and Nightingales	Nominated	
Critics' Choice Super Awards	2026	Best Actor in a Horror Series, Limited Series or Made-for-TV Movie	Widow's Bay	Won	
Critics' Choice Television Awards	2013	Best Actor in a Drama Series	The Americans	Nominated	
Critics' Choice Television Awards	2014	Best Actor in a Drama Series	The Americans	Nominated	
Critics' Choice Television Awards	2015	Best Actor in a Drama Series	The Americans	Nominated	
Critics' Choice Television Awards	2016	Best Actor in a Drama Series	The Americans	Nominated	
Critics' Choice Television Awards	2019	Best Actor in a Drama Series	The Americans	Won	
Critics' Choice Television Awards	2021	Best Actor in a Drama Series	Perry Mason	Nominated	
Critics' Choice Television Awards	2026	Best Actor in a Limited Series or Movie Made For Television	The Beast in Me	Nominated	
Dorian Awards	2019	TV Performance of the Year — Actor	The Americans	Nominated	
Dorian Awards	2026	Best TV Performance — Comedy	Widow's Bay	Nominated	
Drama League Award	2012	Distinguished Performance	Look Back in Anger	Nominated	
Golden Globe Awards	2017	Best Actor – Television Series Drama	The Americans	Nominated	
Golden Globe Awards	2019	Best Actor – Television Series Drama	The Americans	Nominated	
Golden Globe Awards	2021	Best Actor – Television Series Drama	Perry Mason	Nominated	
Golden Globe Awards	2026	Best Actor – Miniseries or Television Film	The Beast in Me	Nominated	
Primetime Emmy Awards	2016	Outstanding Lead Actor in a Drama Series	The Americans (episode: "The Magic of David Copperfield V")	Nominated	
Primetime Emmy Awards	2017	Outstanding Guest Actor in a Comedy Series	Girls (episode: "American Bitch")	Nominated	
Primetime Emmy Awards	2017	Outstanding Lead Actor in a Drama Series	The Americans (episode: "Crossbreed")	Nominated	
Primetime Emmy Awards	2018	Outstanding Lead Actor in a Drama Series	The Americans (episode: "START")	Won	
Primetime Emmy Awards	2021	Outstanding Lead Actor in a Drama Series	Perry Mason (episode: "Chapter 8")	Nominated	
Primetime Emmy Awards	2026	Outstanding Comedy Series	Widow's Bay	Won	
Primetime Emmy Awards	2026	Outstanding Lead Actor in a Comedy Series	Widow's Bay (episode: "The Inaugural Swim")	Won	
Primetime Emmy Awards	2026	Outstanding Lead Actor in a Limited or Anthology Series or Movie	The Beast in Me	Won	
Satellite Awards	2017	Best Actor – Television Series Drama	The Americans	Nominated	
Satellite Awards	2019	Best Actor – Television Series Drama	The Americans	Nominated	
Satellite Awards	2021	Best Actor – Television Series Drama	Perry Mason	Nominated	
Satellite Awards	2026	Best Actor – Miniseries or Television Film	The Beast in Me	Nominated	
Television Critics Association Awards	2013	Individual Achievement in Drama	The Americans	Nominated	
Television Critics Association Awards	2014	Individual Achievement in Drama	The Americans	Nominated	
Television Critics Association Awards	2015	Individual Achievement in Drama	The Americans	Nominated	
Television Critics Association Awards	2018	Individual Achievement in Drama	The Americans	Nominated	
Television Critics Association Awards	2026	Individual Achievement in Comedy	Widow's Bay	Nominated	

== Bibliography ==
- Patagonia: Crossing the Plain (2010) – a photographic account of his month-long journey on horseback while filming a documentary on Patagonia, and the Welsh settlers who made it their home having journeyed from Wales in the late 19^{th} century.
