= Brothers & Sisters season 3 =

Brothers & Sisters
- Season 3
- DVD cover
- No. of episodes: 24

Release
- Original network: ABC
- Original release: September 20, 2008 – May 10, 2009

Season chronology
- ← Previous; Season 2 Next → Season 4

The third season of Brothers & Sisters consisted of a full 24 episodes. The season premiered on ABC on September 28, 2008, and concluded May 10, 2009.

== Cast ==
Luke Macfarlane, who portrays Kevin's husband Scotty Wandell, was upgraded to a series regular.

All principal cast members returned for the third season as well as Luke Macfarlane, who portrays Scotty Wandell, being upgraded to a main character after guest starring in seasons one and two. This season introduced new recurring characters Ryan Lafferty (Luke Grimes) revealed to be William Walker's love child, Trish Evans (Sonja Sohn) as Kitty and Robert's birth mother and Alec Tyler (Matt Letscher) a single dad who grows close to Kitty.

This season also saw the departure of Julia Walker (Sarah Jane Morris). Her final episode; entitled 'Julia', revolved around her character's decision to start a new life with her daughter Elizabeth after discovering Tommy's lies and illegal activities at Ojai.

Chad Berry; Kevin's ex-boyfriend (portrayed by Jason Lewis) will make a guest appearance after bumping into him in a bar. As will Sarah's ex-boyfriend/ business partner Graham Finch (Steven Weber) who will cross paths with the eldest Walker sibling as she tries to get her new business off the ground.

=== Main cast ===
- Dave Annable as Justin Walker
- Maxwell Perry Cotton as Cooper Whedon
- Kerris Dorsey as Paige Whedon
- Sally Field as Nora Walker
- Calista Flockhart as Kitty Walker
- Balthazar Getty as Tommy Walker
- Rachel Griffiths as Sarah Walker
- Rob Lowe as Robert McCallister
- Luke Macfarlane as Scotty Wandell
- Sarah Jane Morris as Julia Walker
- Matthew Rhys as Kevin Walker
- Ron Rifkin as Saul Holden
- Emily VanCamp as Rebecca Harper
- Patricia Wettig as Holly Harper

=== Recurring and notable guest stars ===
- Luke Grimes as Ryan Lafferty
- Nigel Havers as Roger Grant
- Megan Follows as Maggie Stephens
- Matt Letscher as Alec Tyler
- Jason Lewis as Chad Barry (1 episode)
- Will McCormack as Ethan Travis
- Ken Olin as David Caplan
- Eric Christian Olsen as Kyle DeWitt
- Mitch Pileggi as Browne Carter
- Tom Skerritt as William Walker
- Sonja Sohn as Trish Evans
- Steven Weber as Graham Finch
- Cristián de la Fuente as Cal

== Storylines ==
This season introduced Ryan Lafferty, the Walkers' half-brother, to the series as well as dealt with Holly's increasing presence at Ojai Foods. All the siblings also face serious problems within their relationships, while Rebecca searches for her new place within the family.

=== Nora ===
Although Nora is initially against finding Ryan, she later changes her mind and goes to meet Ryan and invites him to stay with her. However, it is made apparent later in the season that Ryan may have had ulterior motives for agreeing with Nora's request. He also causes problems between Justin and Rebecca after developing feelings for Rebecca and encouraging her distrust in Justin.

Nora also decides to start a nonprofit center for families of patients with illnesses and becomes attracted to her architect, Roger. The two begin to see each other; however, things become complicated when Nora discovers Roger is married, but he and his wife share an open relationship. After trying to feel comfortable in this modern relationship, Nora tells Roger that she can no longer be with him and that he should go back to his wife.

=== Sarah ===
Sarah is having trouble finding work as a single mother after leaving Ojai, while her decision to leave the family business has created uneasy feelings within the family, especially with Tommy. Eventually, she decides to risk putting her money into helping 'Greenatopia' a small internet business company which two young, recent college graduates run out of their apartment. After Tommy disappears and Ojai is put in jeopardy, Sarah eventually goes back to the family business and must learn to work alongside Holly. She also faces new problems as her daughter, Paige, begins to grow up.

=== Kitty & Robert ===
Kitty and Robert move forward in their decision to adopt a child, while at the same time Robert has secretly decided to run for governor. Kitty writes a tell-all book about her time in politics and working for Robert, and agrees that she can no longer work for him. Robert has a heart attack the same day their new son, Evan, is born, leaving Kitty to take care of them both and causing a rift in their marriage. Kitty becomes close to a single dad, Alec, whom she meets in the park. However, after a near car accident leaves Kitty and Alec with similar wounds, Robert realizes what is happening. He tells Alec to stay away from his wife and Kitty that she must make a choice. Although Kitty decides to stay with her husband, their relationship is strained for the rest of the season.

=== Kevin & Scotty ===
Kevin accepts a job offer from Robert as lawyer and press secretary after he was passed over for partner in the prestigious law firm he worked for. As well as trying to handle his new job, Kevin must adjust to married life with new husband Scotty, who frequently feels caught in the middle of troubles between Robert and his sister Kitty, whom he misleads at Robert's request.

=== Justin & Rebecca ===
Rebecca and Justin struggle to begin a romantic relationship, as they adjust from thinking they were family and as they try to keep the feud between their families from affecting them. Justin finally decides his path in life and applies to medical school. After a fight with Justin, Rebecca flies to New York and meets up with David. After spending some time together, David surprises Rebecca at the airport and tells her he has decided to join her on the same flight back to LA. Holly and David decide to get back together and be a family.

After a brief separation, Justin and Rebecca get back together and become engaged at the end of the season.

=== Tommy & Julia ===
After driving Sarah and Saul from Ojai, Tommy decides it's time to get rid of Holly but engages in an illegal transaction to do so. Once he is discovered, Tommy flees to avoid going to prison. After spending time waiting for him to return, Julia leaves with Elizabeth to start a new job in Seattle. The Walkers go to Mexico to find Tommy at the end of the season but he decides to stay as he's in a good place and helping people. The family says goodbye and leaves him in Mexico in the final moments of the season.

== Episodes ==
No. overall	No. in season	Title	Directed by	Written by	Original release date	US viewers (millions)
40	1	"Glass Houses"	Tucker Gates	Molly Newman & David Marshall Grant	September 28, 2008	12.03
When Kevin gets access to his boss's beach house, he wants to spend a romantic weekend for two with Scotty, but the entire family accidentally butts in. Meanwhile, Kevin and Sarah continue pursuing Ryan, against Nora's wishes. Tommy plans to fire Kevin as the firm's attorney, a decision Sarah strongly disagrees with. Paige and Cooper blackmail Justin into doing them little favors because they found out about him and Rebecca. Kitty is angry with Sarah when she discovers that her recommendation letter was really written by Nora. As newly-appointed C.E.O., Holly is giving Sarah a hard time at work.
41	2	"Book Burning"	Laura Innes	Sherri Cooper & Jennifer Levin	October 5, 2008	10.33
Kitty tries to hide from her family and Robert that she wrote a book during the campaign. The entire family, especially Nora, finds the contents of the book extremely offensive. The tension culminates at the dinner that Kitty and Robert were throwing for their adoption agent. Meanwhile, Justin and Rebecca are uncomfortable with each other when it comes to sex. Holly decides to give Rebecca the two million dollars from her trust fund, and Rebecca suspects that she has an ulterior motive. Kitty and Nora have a heart to heart. Holly does a little investigation of her own regarding Ryan.
42	3	"Tug of War"	Gloria Muzio	Josh Reims & Liz Tigelaar	October 12, 2008	9.90
Kevin is forced to make a professional decision that goes against his beliefs and could risk alienating Scotty. Difficult times at Ojai Foods cause both Tommy and Holly as well as Sarah and Saul to make drastic decisions. Saul resigns from Ojai. Justin meets a man who he saved in the war who asked him to come have dinner and meet his family... He called him a hero. Justin can't bring himself to talk to Rebecca about his war experiences.
43	4	"Everything Must Go"	Michael Schultz	Nancy Won & Michael Foley	October 19, 2008	9.82
Nora organizes a garage sale in order to collect the money she needs to start her own charity. Justin worries that the real reason for the sale is that she wants to get rid of everything that belonged to William. Julia pushes Sarah and Tommy into reconciliation. Robert is giving Kitty a hard time about her decision to quit. Holly investigates the past of Ryan Lafferty. Robert has an unusual proposal for Kevin. Holly and Rebecca try to rebuild their relationship.
44	5	"You Get What You Need"	Chad Lowe	David Marshall Grant & Cliff Olin	October 26, 2008	9.86
When Scotty's parents come to town, Kevin has trouble fitting them into his schedule, which leads to a fight with Scotty. Sarah learns that finding a job that she will be able to juggle with raising her two children is harder than she thought. Nora tries her hardest to get her new charity going. An unexpected twist at work makes Kevin accept Robert's offer, much to his and Kitty's surprise. Tommy and Saul patch things up. Justin and Rebecca trick Nora and Holly into having a discussion about Ryan.
45	6	"Bakersfield"	Gloria Muzio	Molly Newman & Peter Calloway	November 2, 2008	9.62
Nora and Kitty go to Bakersfield, where they meet with George Lafferty, but it doesn't go as planned. Sarah gets a lucrative business proposal. Rebecca wants to celebrate a milestone in Justin's sobriety, but she accidentally causes a fist fight between Kevin and Tommy. Kitty and Robert get the news from the adoption agency that they got picked.
46	7	"Do You Believe in Magic"	Michael Morris	Sherri Cooper-Landsman & Jennifer Levin	November 9, 2008	10.11
George Lafferty drops by on Tommy and Julia's anniversary party, creating a mess amongst the family. Kitty and Robert meet Trish, the birth mother, but Kitty inadvertently makes matters worse. Kevin has some damaging information on Robert and starts questioning him. Justin tells Rebecca that he loves her, but she has trouble saying it back.
47	8	"Going Once...Going Twice"	Karen Gaviola	Brian Studler & Beth Schwartz	November 16, 2008	10.00
When Scotty gets promoted to head chef and Kevin sees that his paycheck is now significantly smaller, he tries to overcompensate for it by buying a house, that Nora had originally planned for her charity, as a gift to Scotty. Sarah tries to cheer Kitty up by keeping her busy. Justin meets a guy at his N.A. meeting and tries to match-make between him and Saul, bringing him to Scotty's celebratory dinner.
48	9	"Unfinished Business"	Michael Morris	Jason Wilborn & Nancy Won	November 30, 2008	10.07
Nora tricks Kevin, Scotty, Justin and Saul into helping her reconstruct the house for her charity. Kitty gets a call from Trish, but comes to blows with Robert when they realize they have different ideas as to how to bring a baby into the world. Sarah meets up with an old fling, which almost costs her her job. Holly hires Rebecca full-time without consulting Tommy.
49	10	"Just a Sliver"	Michael Schultz	Molly Newman & David Marshall Grant	December 7, 2008	10.55
The Walker siblings, except from Sarah, decide to spend Thanksgiving away from home, but their plans are ruined when Elizabeth needs a liver transplant. With moral support of Scotty and Rebecca respectively, Kevin and Justin both get tested for paternity. Meanwhile, Saul gives Nora much needed support.
50	11	"A Father Dreams"	Tom Amandes	Jennifer Levin & Michael Foley	January 4, 2009	9.09
Scotty and Nora fight over the best way to treat bed-bound Kevin. Justin questions his future after being depicted as a loser in Cooper's class. Kitty fills in for Kevin as Robert's communications director. Saul hires Ojai's original architect to help repair Nora's house. Kevin and Tommy argue when Tommy has a hard time accepting that Kevin is Elizabeth's biological father. Kevin and Scotty have a conversation about their future.
51	12	"Sibling Rivalry"	Jeff Melman	Liz Tigelaar & Josh Reims	January 11, 2009	8.97
Kitty is promoting her book, but the family and Robert are too busy to show support. Sarah is in a financial trouble which could cost Greenatopia the launch. Kevin feels conflicted when he has to keep Robert's secrets from Kitty. Nora and Roger finally find common ground. When Saul denies his help to Tommy in planning to get rid of Holly, Tommy tricks Rebecca into helping him.
52	13	"It's Not Easy Being Green"	Laura Innes	Peter Calloway & Sherri Cooper	January 18, 2009	8.87
Sarah is dealing with Paige hitting puberty, all the while throwing a party for the launch of Greenatopia. Justin becomes a sponsor to an attractive girl. Kevin and Robert go hunting. At the Greenatopia party, Ethan has a shocking revelation for Sarah, and Nora and Rebecca each face temptations.
53	14	"Owning It"	Bethany Rooney	Cliff Olin & David Marshall Grant	February 8, 2009	9.26
Kitty is offered a job she longed for, but she has doubts as to whether she could juggle career and motherhood. Nora finds out that Roger is married, but things aren't quite like they seem. Saul brings his boyfriend, Henry, to Kitty's baby shower thrown by Nora and Sarah. Rebecca starts suspecting Tommy's honesty about the new business deal, and she and Justin have a fight on account of it. Holly and Nora have an interesting conversation. Robert finally comes clean to Kitty about running for governor. Rebecca looks up David. Nora gets a shocking phone call.
54	15	"Lost and Found"	David Paymer	Michael Foley & Jennifer Levin	February 15, 2009	9.00
Kitty finds out someone killed her interview with the Los Angeles Times. Nora invites Ryan to her house. Holly discovers what Tommy's been up to and the ownership he has in Ojai Foods.
55	16	"Troubled Waters"	Ken Olin	Monica Owusu-Breen & Sherri Cooper-Landsman	March 1, 2009	11.98
56	17	"Troubled Waters"	Ken Olin	David Marshall Grant & Molly Newman	March 1, 2009	11.98
Part one of two. The Walker family experiences the thrill of a new life born and the desperation and terror of loss when one of their own has a life-threatening crisis. When Trish goes into labour two weeks early, Kitty and Nora keep her company in the hospital room as she delivers the baby. Robert suffers a heart attack on his way to the hospital, putting his life in the balance on the day that his and Kitty's son, Evan, is born. After Robert suffers his heart attack doctors rush to save his life, as the Walkers cling to hope that he'll survive. While Holly is visiting, Julia gets the phone call about Robert's heart attack, leaving Holly to babysit Elizabeth. Justin continues to try to get a hold of Rebecca, while he tries to calm the rest of his family down; Rebecca starts questioning if she should tell Holly about everything on Tommy's computer. Holly finds that Tommy is trying to push her out of the company and plans on confronting him. Robert gets through surgery fine, and eventually gets to hold his new son; Kitty and Robert decide to name him Evan.
57	18	"Taking Sides"	Michael Morris	Michael Foley & Beth Schwartz	March 8, 2009	10.32
Even in the wake of a life-threatening medical crisis and the excitement surrounding the birth of his son, Robert remains steadfast in his drive to run for governor, despite the damage that it may do to his marriage. Meanwhile, Saul and Sarah go to extremes to hide Tommy's legal troubles from Nora, and Ryan gets a bit too close too fast for anyone's good.
58	19	"Spring Broken"	Richard Coad	Sherri Cooper-Landsman & Brian Studler	March 15, 2009	10.44
Kevin and Justin take Tommy on a getaway to help him make a decision about his legal future. Meanwhile, Kitty and Evan retreat to Nora's to get acquainted with her new half brother, Ryan Lafferty, while Robert recovers.
59	20	"Missing"	Michael Schultz	Jason Wilborn & Nancy Won	March 22, 2009	10.15
Desperate to get through to Tommy before his legal troubles worsen, Nora reaches out for help to the person whom he hurt most deeply. Meanwhile, Ryan gets a bit too close to Rebecca for Justin's comfort.
60	21	"S3X"	Laura Innes	Cliff Olin & David Marshall Grant	April 19, 2009	9.46
The Walkers keep up hope that Tommy will return home when Holly considers dropping the charges. Meanwhile Sarah makes yet another major career change, Kitty questions whether or not her marriage will survive, when she becomes friendly with a widowed father she met when she takes Evan on park outings. Kevin and Scotty consider a surprising proposal from Chad (guest starring Jason Lewis). Scotty, Kevin and Chad share drinks. Sarah reclaims her Ojai office and meets Cal, a staffer in accounting. He helps her unpack. Even in the heat of the moment, Sarah's business savvy remains. When David, Holly, Rebecca and Ryan have dinner, David can't help but notice Ryan's behavior around his daughter.
61	22	"Julia"	Michael Morris	Molly Newman & Michael Foley	April 26, 2009	9.31
Out of patience waiting for Tommy to return home, Julia decides to try returning to teaching---even if it means relocation. Robert discovers Kitty's relationship with Alec---and assumes the worst. Holly and Sarah finally find balance in their relationship.
62	23	"Let's Call The Whole Thing Off"	Laura Innes	Peter Calloway & Daniel Silk	May 3, 2009	9.11
When Kitty and Robert reach a crossroads in their marriage, she is forced to reflect on her father's (guest starring Tom Skerritt as William Walker) past indiscretions and decide what's most important in life. Meanwhile, Ryan makes a discovery about his mother's death and takes a huge leap in the wrong direction to vie for Rebecca's affection. Kitty affirms Ryan's suspicion somewhat when she remembers her father planning the trip to Reno that ended in Ryan's mother's death.
63	24	"Mexico"	Ken Olin	Alison Schapker & Monica Owusu-Breen	May 10, 2009	8.75
When the Walker family reaches out to Tommy, they're devastated to find that he may be unwilling to accept their help. Meanwhile, Robert and Kitty reach a crossroads in their marriage that they may not be able to successfully navigate. Justin makes plans for the future, with or without Rebecca. Saul reveals a shocking admission about Ryan's mother.

== Production ==
The show was created by Ken Olin and Jon Robin Baitz. Brothers & Sisters is produced by Berlanti Television, After Portsmouth, and Touchstone Television (Fall 2006-Spring 2007), which is now ABC Studios (Fall 2007–present).

== Ratings ==
The third season ranked #33 this season, the highest position it has held yet. However, the average number of viewers dropped to around 10.6 million.

Season Three Weekly

Episode #	Title	Air date	Rating	Share	18-49	Viewers	Rank
40	"Glass Houses"	September 28, 2008		12	4.8	12.03	
41	"Book Burning	October 5, 2008			4.0	10.33	
42	"Tug of War"	October 12, 2008			3.6	9.90	
43	"Everything Must Go"	October 19, 2008			3.5	9.82	
44	"You Get What You Need"	October 26, 2008			3.6	9.86	
45	"Bakersfield"	November 2, 2008			3.4	9.62	
46	"Do You Believe in Magic?"	November 9, 2008		9	3.7	10.11	
47	"Going Once...Going Twice"	November 16, 2008		9	3.7	10.00	
48	"Unfinished Business"	November 30, 2008		8	3.5	10.07	
49	"Just a Sliver"	December 7, 2008		10	3.9	10.55	
50	"A Father Dreams"	January 4, 2009		9	3.5	9.09	
51	"Sibling Rivalry"	January 11, 2009			3.4	8.97	
52	"It's Not Easy Being Green"	January 18, 2009			2.9	8.87	
53	"Owning It"	February 8, 2009		8	3.1	9.26	
54	"Lost & Found"	February 15, 2009		8	3.2	9.00	
55/56	"Troubled Waters, Parts 1 and 2"	March 1, 2009		11	4.1	11.98	
57	"Taking Sides"	March 8, 2009		9	3.5	10.32	
58	"Spring Broken"	March 15, 2009		10	3.7	10.44	
59	"Missing"	March 22, 2009		9	3.7	10.15	
60	"S3X"	April 19, 2009		9	3.6	9.46	
61	"Julia"	April 26, 2009		8	3.3	9.31	
62	"Let's Call The Whole Thing Off"	May 3, 2009		8	3.1	9.11	
63	"Mexico"	May 10, 2009		8	3.1	8.75	#3
