= Brothers & Sisters season 2 =

Brothers & Sisters
- Season 2
- DVD cover
- No. of episodes: 16

Release
- Original network: ABC
- Original release: September 30, 2007 – May 11, 2008

Season chronology
- ← Previous; Season 1 Next → Season 3

The second season of Brothers & Sisters consisted of only sixteen episodes due to the 2007–2008 Writers Guild of America strike. Twelve of the episodes were shown beforehand, ending with "Compromises"; a further four episodes were produced to finish off the season. The first half of the season dealt with many issues and plot points left unresolved from the first season.

In the UK the show changed to Channel 4's sister Channel E4 beginning March 30 and ending in July. The series was then repeated on Channel 4 in October of the same year around 4:30 pm on Saturdays, but after a couple of weeks moved it to Sunday nights in an unspecified time slot after midnight.

== Cast ==
Rob Lowe, who portrays Robert McCallister, is upgraded to a series regular as his character prepares to marry Kitty.

This season also introduced new recurring characters Graham Finch (Steven Weber) and Isaac Marshall (Danny Glover) as love interests for Sarah and Nora respectively. Emily Rose will also guest star as Lena Branigan; a friend of Rebecca's who starts working at Walker Landing and grows close to Tommy. Luke Macfarlane will also reappear as Scotty Wandell.

Series producer Ken Olin also guest stars as David Caplan, a film director and Holly's ex-boyfriend.

=== Main ===
- Dave Annable as Justin Walker
- Maxwell Perry Cotton as Cooper Whedon
- Kerris Dorsey as Paige Whedon
- Sally Field as Nora Walker
- Calista Flockhart as Kitty Walker
- Balthazar Getty as Tommy Walker
- Rachel Griffiths as Sarah Walker
- Rob Lowe as Robert McCallister
- Sarah Jane Morris as Julia Walker
- Matthew Rhys as Kevin Walker
- Ron Rifkin as Saul Holden
- Emily VanCamp as Rebecca Harper
- Patricia Wettig as Holly Harper

=== Recurring and notable guest stars ===
- Danny Glover as Isaac Marshall
- Luke Macfarlane as Scotty Wandell
- Emily Rose as Lena Branigan
- John Pyper-Ferguson as Joe Whedon
- Tom Skerritt as William Walker
- Steven Weber as Graham Finch
- Eric Winter as Jason McCallister

== Storylines ==
=== Nora ===
Nora spent the summer sending video messages to Justin and it is only with Rebecca's help that she has managed to get by. Once he returns, she and Rebecca spend time trying to help him recover physically and mentally. Nora enters into a new romance with Isaac Marshall (Danny Glover) after meeting him when Kitty brings him in to assist with Robert's campaign.

=== Sarah ===
Sarah now must deal with being a single parent, and begins a relationship with Graham (Steven Weber), who comes to work at Ojai. He suggests a risky business deal to help raise Ojai's profits, which Saul supports but Sarah is not on board until the very end. The deals falls apart, leaving the business in jeopardy. After this, she decides to end her relationship with Graham telling him that her feelings for him clouded her judgment. This also causes tension between her and her mother, as she takes the blame for the deal. It is only after Saul reveals the truth that Nora apologizes to Sarah.

Sarah is angered after the only way to save the company from closing is to merge with 'Walker Landing,' which sees she and Tommy as vice-presidents but Holly as chair and CEO of the entire company. Although she accepts this is the only solution, she finds it difficult to report to Holly, as she believes Holly plans to take the entire company from the Walker family.

=== Kevin ===
While Jason goes away for six months on church work, Kevin is reunited with Scotty and decides to end things with Jason so that he and Scotty can give their relationship another try. They move in together and get married in the season finale. At the same time, Kevin tries to get his uncle Saul to accept his own feelings and admit to his homosexuality, which strains their relationship until Saul finally admits the truth.

Kevin, along with Sarah, becomes suspicious about why Rebecca's initial, along with theirs, was used for William's password to his secret accounts. Kevin, while recalling how his father accepted his sexuality, remembers his father talking of another woman he knew who had a son named Ryan and they believe that he, in fact, is their father's love child and not Rebecca. They sit Nora down in the final episode to reveal what they have discovered.

=== Kitty & Robert ===
Kitty and Robert plan their wedding as well as deal with Robert's campaign. In the middle of the season, they are married at Nora's home. Prior to the wedding, Kitty discovers she is pregnant and, although at first they are worried, Kitty soon becomes excited. But, their happiness is short-lived when Kitty experiences a miscarriage. Then, they discover they're unable to conceive naturally. After several failed attempts, at the end of the season, they decide to explore adoption.

=== Tommy & Julia ===
At the start of the season, Tommy and Julia are struggling because of the death of their son. Julia decides they need some time apart and goes to stay with her parents. During this separation, Tommy begins an affair with his new secretary, and friend of Rebecca, Lena (Emily Rose). He calls things off with Lena when Julia comes home, although he reveals the truth to Julia and she reveals she had a one-night stand with an old boyfriend. They decide to stay together and work on their marriage.

=== Justin & Rebecca ===
After being injured, Justin returns from Iraq early. Together, Nora and Rebecca try to help him heal, yet he finds recovery extremely difficult and becomes addicted to his pain medication. He begins a romance with Lena, after Tommy ends their affair, which Rebecca is unhappy about. After a confrontation with Rebecca (resulting in her moving back in with her mother) about his relationship and his medication, Justin seeks help and his brother stays with him during his withdrawal.

Rebecca then meets David, an old friend of Holly's, which leads to her discovery that she is not in fact a Walker and that David is her real father. After trying to hide this from the Walkers, in fear of being rejected, she finally comes clean and each of them tells her that she will always be part of the family. Near the end of the season, Justin tries to hide and deny his growing feelings for Rebecca, and after he admits how he feels, she reveals that they are not related and believes that everything that has happened was meant to bring them together. The season ends with Justin and Rebecca sharing their first kiss.

== Episodes ==
No. overall	No. in season	Title	Directed by	Written by	Original release date	US viewers (millions)
24	1	"Home Front"	Ken Olin	Monica Owusu-Breen & Alison Schapker	September 30, 2007	12.83
After being apart the whole summer, the Walkers reunite to celebrate Kitty's birthday (which also coincides with the anniversary of William Walker's death). Kevin has to make a huge compromise in order to salvage his relationship with Jason. Sarah and Joe have sex and she mistakes it for him wanting to move back in. What he really wants is a divorce. Tommy does not have enough time for Sarah because he is struggling with the loss of his son, arguing with Julia and making the wine business work. Saul questions his decisions in life when his old friend Milo comes to visit. Nora is worried to death because she hasn't heard from Justin in over three weeks and angry at Kitty for not wanting to use her influence on Robert in order to make sure that he is all right. Kitty is jealous of Rebecca, who is the only one who has been living at the house with Nora the whole summer and being there for her. Nora and Holly visit William's grave.
25	2	"An American Family"	Gloria Muzio	David Marshall Grant & Molly Newman	October 7, 2007	11.91
While Kevin, Kitty and Nora take a road trip to pick up Justin from a hospital in San Diego, they hear a radio program, in which the host slanders the Walker family. Kitty calls the radio and winds up making things worse. Sarah learns that Joe has reunited with his first wife. Rebecca comes clean to Sarah about the kiss. Holly and Rebecca work through their conflict. Tommy is still fighting with Julia, while Justin has difficulties dealing with his dependency on others.
26	3	"History Repeating"	Matt Shakman	Jon Robin Baitz & Jennifer Cecil	October 14, 2007	12.51
Scotty appears again, asking Kevin to represent him in a DUI case. It's discovered that he's in chef school and has an internship as a sous chef in a famous LA restaurant. Meanwhile, Nora wants Rebecca to convince Justin to use pain medications. Kitty confronts Robert's ex-wife Courtney, while Julia takes her daughter and goes to her parents for a while, feeling that she needs some time away from Tommy.
27	4	"States of Union"	Michael Schultz	Sherri Cooper-Landsman & Liz Tigelaar	October 21, 2007	11.54
Kitty and Sarah arrange a getaway to the Ojai spa in order to forget their problems: Nora, of course, butts in and tags along. Meanwhile, Scotty spots Saul at a gay event and tells Kevin about it, who then corners Saul. And Tommy's loneliness crosses the line when he opens up to his office manager, Lena. The two sleep together and Holly confronts him on it. Rebecca worries that Justin's fast recovery is the result of a medication overdose.
28	5	"Domestic Issues"	Ken Olin	Peter Calloway & Cliff Olin	October 28, 2007	12.59
Kevin represents Sarah in the custody battle with Joe, who is demanding full custody over Paige and Cooper. Kitty discovers she is pregnant, but Robert doesn't react the way that she would like. Tommy's affair with Lena goes on, while Justin is still overdosing on pain medications. Joe gets full custody of the children, on Halloween, no less.
29	6	"Two Places"	Gloria Muzio	Monica Owusu-Breen & Alison Schapker	November 4, 2007	12.09
Kitty brings in an expert, Isaac Marshall (guest star Danny Glover) to advise Robert on his campaign, not knowing that the two had disagreements in the past. Meanwhile, Nora prepares an emergency wedding at the house, which gets canceled after Kitty suffers a miscarriage. Meanwhile, Paige's acting out forces Joe to change the custody arrangement; he and Sarah agree on joined custody. Kevin learns that Scotty has nowhere to live and invites him to stay at his place. Rebecca figures out that Justin is using again and moves back in with Holly.
30	7	"36 Hours"	David Paymer	Molly Newman & David Marshall Grant	November 11, 2007	12.35
At Holly's urging, Rebecca tells the family that Justin is doing drugs again so they decide to hold an intervention. They agree to stay the night and take care of him. Saul continues fighting with Kevin about his sexuality, but eventually admits to Nora that he was once in love with a man. Kevin confronts Tommy about his affair with Lena. Meanwhile, Robert spends a day with his daughter.
31	8	"Something New"	Michael Morris	Jennifer Cecil & Sherri Cooper-Landsman	November 25, 2007	12.25
Kitty, Sarah and Rebecca go out looking for bridesmaids' dresses. Kitty finds a perfect wedding dress for herself, but she had already promised Nora that she would wear her old wedding dress. Meanwhile, Kevin sleeps with Scotty and decides to break up with Jason in order to give his relationship with Scotty another chance. Julia comes back with Elizabeth and Tommy is feeling guilty about his affair with Lena, who, meanwhile, starts dating Justin. Sarah goes out for a dinner with a charming business consultant. Nora gets in touch with her old boyfriend (guest star Chevy Chase) and the two catch up. When Kitty feels neglected Robert arranges their own private dance - with no other than Lyle Lovett.
32	9	"Holy Matrimony"	Robert Lieberman	Mark B. Perry and Monica Owusu-Breen & Alison Schapker	December 2, 2007	12.56
On Kitty and Robert's wedding day, a political scandal very damaging for Robert's career threatens to be exposed. Kitty gets a call from Isaac who promises to take care of it. At the wedding, Justin shows up with Lena, much to Tommy's surprise. Rebecca tells Justin about the affair between Tommy and Lena. Everyone from McCallister's family is giving Kevin the cold shoulder for dumping Jason, while Scotty is offended because Kevin isn't telling anyone that the two are a couple again. Isaac and Nora start bonding. Holly gets a visit from an old friend.
33	10	"The Feast of the Epiphany"	Laura Innes	David Marshall Grant & Jason Wilborn	January 13, 2008	10.90
Nora invites Isaac to dinner with the entire family, who she used as a buffer because she was terrified of having a real date with him. At the dinner, the truth of Tommy's affair comes to light, but is overshadowed by Julia's shocking confession. Isaac and Kitty do everything they can to salvage Robert's campaign. Kevin got an e-mail from Jason saying he'll be back in town soon and is afraid to tell Scotty. Sarah and Graham start flirting more intensely. Justin is trying to hide his ongoing relationship with Lena. David comes to dinner with Rebecca and Holly, which starts raising some questions about their past.
34	11	"The Missionary Imposition"	Michael Morris	Daniel Silk & Brian Studler	February 10, 2008	8.63
When Jason returns from Malaysia and visits Kevin at home, Scotty intentionally shows up and makes matters worse. Tommy and Julia work hard on their marriage, but they don't resolve anything. Lena quits her job and breaks up with Justin. Sarah and Graham have a very lucrative business meeting with a wealthy investor. Nora and Isaac go out on a date.
35	12	"Compromises"	David Paymer	Cliff Olin & Peter Calloway	February 17, 2008	8.50
When Sarah gets her divorce papers (but is reluctant to sign them) and Scotty and his friends accuse Kevin of being too uptight, the two siblings go to a gay bar and try to have some fun. Meanwhile, Robert and Jason come to blows when Jason finds out that Isaac was the one who outed him. Kitty catches a cold and gets to spend some time with Robert's children. Rebecca takes interest in photography and asks David for help.
36	13	"Separation Anxiety"	Gloria Muzio	David Marshall Grant & Molly Newman	April 20, 2008	10.09
When Isaac asks Nora to come with him to Washington D.C. and she agrees, the siblings try their best to keep her at home. Sarah tells Saul to pass on a business offer because of her personal relationship with Graham. After Robert gave up the presidential race to his opponent, he and Kitty try harder than ever to start a family. Rebecca takes a DNA test in order to discover the identity of her father.
37	14	"Double Negative"	Michael Schultz	Josh Reims & Liz Tigelaar	April 27, 2008	11.19
While preparing for a family charity event, Rebecca reveals that David is her real father and decides to call him on it. She doesn't, however, tell Holly or the Walkers. David decides to go away, leaving Holly heartbroken. Not taking Sarah's advice on passing Graham's business deal, Saul puts the future of the company in jeopardy. While trying to help Scotty out financially, Kevin goes a bit too far. Robert gets an offer for the vice president spot, but denies it. Nora makes plans about the future.
38	15	"Moral Hazard"	Michael Morris	Sherri Cooper-Landsman & Jason Wilborn	May 4, 2008	10.46
Sarah decides to take full responsibility for what happened to Ojai Foods. Nora pushes her into getting in a deal with Walker Landing. Holly drafts a proposal that she benefits from and presents it as the company's only choice. Justin admits that he had feelings for Rebecca briefly, and she finally tells him the truth about her father. Holly and Rebecca have one final fallout. Saul finally admits to Kevin that he's gay. Kevin and Scotty make a decision that will affect the rest of their lives.
39	16	"Prior Commitments"	Ken Olin	Greg Berlanti & Monica Owusu-Breen & Alison Schapker	May 11, 2008	10.69
While preparing for the wedding, Kevin finds out that Scotty's parents won't be attending it, so he goes on a road trip with Tommy and Justin to try to convince them to come. The whole family learns that Rebecca is not a Walker, but still decide to include her. Saul inadvertently comes out to the entire family. Sarah obsesses over the fact that their father had to have kept another child from them, and Kevin's suppressed memory comes to light. Kitty and Robert decide to adopt a child. Justin and Rebecca are trying to cope with the fact that they have feelings for each other. Kevin and Scotty commit to spending the rest of their lives together.

== Production ==
The show was created by Ken Olin and Jon Robin Baitz. Brothers & Sisters is produced by Berlanti Television, After Portsmouth, and Touchstone Television (Fall 2006-Spring 2007), which is now ABC Studios (Fall 2007–present).

== Ratings ==
The second season ranked #38, one place down from the previous year and averaged at around 11.5 million viewers.

Episode number Production number	Title	Original airing	Rating	Share	Rating/share (18–49)	Total viewers (in millions)
24; 2-01	Home Front	September 30, 2007	9.1	15	5.1	12.83
25; 2-02	An American Family	October 7, 2007	8.2	14	4.5	11.91
26; 2-03	History Repeating	October 14, 2007	8.5	14	4.8	12.51
27; 2-04	States of Union	October 21, 2007	8.1	13	4.8	11.54
28; 2-05	Domestic Issues	October 28, 2007	8.8	14	5.1	12.59
29; 2-06	Two Places	November 4, 2007	9.3	14	4.6	12.09
30; 2-07	36 Hours	November 11, 2007	9.0	14	5.0	12.35
31; 2-08	Something New	November 25, 2007	8.4	14	4.8	12.25
32; 2-09	Holy Matrimony	December 2, 2007	8.5	14	4.8	12.56
33; 2-10	The Feast of the Epiphany	January 13, 2008	7.4	12	4.2	10.90
34; 2-11	The Missionary Imposition	February 10, 2008	5.8	9	3.1	8.63
35; 2-12	Compromises	February 17, 2008	5.7	9	3.0	8.50
36; 2-13	Separation Anxiety	April 20, 2008	7.2	12	3.6	10.09
37; 2-14	Double Negative	April 27, 2008	7.8	13	4.0	11.19
38; 2-15	Moral Hazard	May 4, 2008	7.5	13	3.9	10.46
39; 2-16	Prior Commitments	May 11, 2008	7.4	13	4.0	10.69
