= Brothers & Sisters season 4 =

Brothers & Sisters
- Season 4
- DVD cover
- No. of episodes: 24

Release
- Original network: ABC
- Original release: September 27, 2009 – May 16, 2010

Season chronology
- ← Previous; Season 3 Next → Season 5

The fourth season of Brothers & Sisters was picked up for a fourth season on April 23, 2009.

The premiere aired on ABC on Sunday September 27, 2009, and concluded May 16, 2010. Season Four began three months after the events of "Mexico".

== Cast ==
Main cast of season four

Most main characters from the previous season returned; however, Tommy (Balthazar Getty) appeared only briefly mid-season, having relocated to Seattle. Sarah Jane Morris left the series, while Luke Grimes was promoted to starring status as newest Walker son, Ryan, only to be written out mid-season. The storyline followed the final demise of Ojai Foods and the discovery of Narrow Lake (an untapped aquifer that made the family rich), as well as the rocky relationship of the finally-married Justin and Rebecca and the politically volatile Kitty and Robert.

Denzel Whitaker, 19, was cast as Carter - Justin's new lab partner - for several episodes as Justin attempted medical school.

Gilles Marini joined the show as Luc Laurent, an artist Sarah meets in France and who eventually follows her home to Pasadena. He was first confirmed for a five episode arc before joining as a permanent part of the Walker tribe.

It was announced that Rob Lowe would be leaving the series at the end of the fourth season; the reason he gave was that he felt "underutilized". It was speculated that he would move to a recurring character and not be killed off, a theory supposedly first supported by the news that the character Alec Tyler who caused problems between Robert and Kitty in the previous season was set to return. However, after lengthy coverage and confirmation that Lowe would leave the series, his injury and subsequent death ended the season and began the next.

The show sought out actors to play certain characters at younger ages for what were first planned as double flashback episodes to air in the second half of the season. Roles for the 1973 scenes were to include William Walker at 33, Nora Walker at 28 and Holly Harper at 21. The 1986 scenes included Sarah Walker at 20, Kitty Walker at 18, Tommy Walker at 16, Kevin Walker at 14 and a 6-yr old Justin. Ultimately, only the 1986 scenes were utilized, featuring the 5 children and Sally Field as a young Nora (although mainly heard and seen in shadow only), in a storyline that revealed a long-hidden family secret about Kevin accidentally causing a friend's paralysis, and Nora and Holly in partnership trying to fend off a hostile takeover from Dennis York, William's former "enforcer" who attempted to blackmail Nora.

=== Main ===
- Dave Annable as Justin Walker
- Maxwell Perry Cotton as Cooper Whedon
- Kerris Dorsey as Paige Whedon
- Sally Field as Nora Walker
- Calista Flockhart as Kitty Walker
- Balthazar Getty as Tommy Walker
- Rachel Griffiths as Sarah Walker
- Luke Grimes as Ryan Lafferty
- Rob Lowe as Robert McCallister
- Luke Macfarlane as Scotty Wandell
- Matthew Rhys as Kevin Walker
- Ron Rifkin as Saul Holden
- Emily VanCamp as Rebecca Harper
- Patricia Wettig as Holly Harper

=== Recurring and notable guest stars ===
- Gilles Marini as Luc Laurent
- Sarah Jane Morris as Julia Walker
- Ken Olin as David Caplan
- Daniel and David Oshionebo as Evan Walker-McCallister
- Marion Ross as Ida Holden
- Tom Skerritt as William Walker
- Denzel Whitaker as Carter
- Anna Wood as young Sarah Walker
- Cody Longo as young Tommy Walker
- Kasey Campbell as young Kevin Walker
- Kay Panabaker as young Kitty Walker
- Dylan Thomas Larsen as young Justin Walker

== Storylines ==
=== Nora ===
Nora begins to date a younger man, Simon, an oncologist who volunteers at her cancer shelter - however Sarah and Kevin become suspicious after they discover he was sued twice as a doctor and believe he had his license taken away. After Nora gives him a sizable amount of money, he apparently loses interest in her and tells her he has to travel for a few weeks. Upon his return, Sarah tries to convince her mother that Simon is up to no good, but it turns out Nora is already aware of this and hands him over to the police. Nora also spends time taking care of Kitty as she, along with her husband Robert and son Evan, move in with Nora during her cancer treatments. Dennis York, an old associate of William's, reappears and blackmails Nora with a secret she has been keeping that could tear apart her family. He agrees not to reveal this secret if she convinces her children to sell their shares in Ojai to him. While trying to talk her children into agreeing, Nora brings Tommy home to talk to Sarah, who is most against selling the company. Nora eventually reveals that she and William had been paying off the family of a young boy who became paralyzed after a fight with Kevin.

She and Holly also investigate York's reasons behind wanting Ojai when the company is in such financial trouble and believe the answers lie in land that William purchased called Narrow Lake, which is later revealed to be an anagram of Nora Walker. In the episode "Lights Out", Nora and Sarah discover that William was planning on building Nora a house on Narrow Lake.

Nora keeps secretly drilling at Narrow Lake, despite Sarah being skeptical. It's revealed that beneath Narrow Lake lies a water main, and now Ojai will become a water company.

=== Kevin & Scotty ===
Kevin and Scotty hope for a baby and decide to look into surrogacy. They continually disagree on the ways in which to approach it, especially when it comes to decisions involving their surrogate, Michelle. Scotty learns his father had an affair and is divorcing his mother. Soon after, Scotty must leave his job, as his restaurant hits financial trouble and must be closed down.

After Robert decides to leave office after his term ends, Kevin becomes unemployed and takes some time to decide what he wants to do with his life. He discover that when Kevin was a teenager and struggling to accept he was gay, he started a fight with a boy, Aaron, who tried to kiss him, resulting in him falling off a platform at Ojai. Although William and Nora told Kevin that Aaron was fine, it is revealed in "Time After Time" that Aaron is in fact paralyzed, and William and Nora have been paying his family ever since. This creates a massive strain in Kevin's relationship with his mother, although they begin to re-bond on his birthday. Kevin and Scotty also discover their surrogate is pregnant.

In the episode "Love All", Scotty and Saul begin to make plans to open their own restaurant, while Kevin begins to feel unhappy with being unemployed. He tells Scotty to go forward with the restaurant while he figures out his purpose.

In the season finale, Scotty is hosting a dinner with the family revealing his new menu. While preparing in the kitchen, Saul discovers that an old partner of his is living with AIDS. Scotty and Kevin tell Saul that they get tested every year and that he should, too. Saul is defensive because he hasn't been sexually active in years and feels that he doesn't need to. Yet, Saul gets tested, and while waiting for the results, he blows up at Scotty and Kevin. He tells them that when he was growing up, the world was a lot less accepting of his lifestyle. Later on, with Nora by his side, Saul calls for his results and tells her that he's negative, and that he'll be okay. In the final car crash scene, after Kevin sees that Scotty is okay, he goes to Saul to see if he's all right. Saul has blood on his hands and face, but tells Kevin not to come closer, that he can't come closer and touch him, implying that he is HIV positive.

=== Kitty & Robert ===
Kitty and Robert's marriage is still damaged from the events of the last year; however, after Kitty discovers she has stage 3 lymphoma, their relationship begins to heal. Robert, supported by Kitty, continues to run for governor as she begins chemotherapy. Shortly before Justin and Rebecca's wedding, Kitty goes for an MRI scan that reveals that the chemotherapy has not worked and the tumors have increased both in size and quantity. At first, she lies to Robert and insists that the results will not be ready until after the wedding; however, she collapses during the ceremony and is taken into the ER, where it's discovered she has a clot on her lung and the cancer is becoming more aggressive. The doctors inform her that her only real chance is to undergo a bone marrow transplant and she must look to her siblings to find a match. The only match is Ryan, who initially refuses. Later, he appears at the hospital and agrees to donate his bone marrow, because he does not want Evan to grow up with an absent parent like him. The transplant is a success, and Kitty enters remission.

Robert agrees to drop his gubernatorial campaign at the same time that Kitty begins talking to Buffy, an old friend, about returning to a life in politics. After Kitty tells Robert, he thinks she should run for his seat. They put the decision to a family vote. After some initial hesitation from Kevin, who is unsure of his future in the job, they all agree that she should run.

Toward to end of the season, Robert begins collecting evidence against a politician named Stanton and gains the suspicion of Kevin. Although Robert promises he is doing nothing dangerous or unethical, once Stanton catches on to what Robert is up to, Stanton threatens to ruin Kitty's career if Robert goes ahead with his information.

Kitty begins campaigning, bringing Nora and Sarah along. Robert has taped proof of Stanton earning money off the backs of American soldiers. He refuses to release the tapes because Stanton threatened Kitty, but he will keep them safe. Meanwhile, Robert speaks to Justin secretly and gives him the key to his safety deposit box. An envelope is inside. Robert tells Justin that if anything happens to him, he should give the key to Kitty and she'll decide what to do with it. Justin notices a certain medicine that Robert is taking and it looks serious.

Lies about Kitty end up on the Internet. They said Kitty was campaigning in a private jet paid for by the tax payers, and that her wig cost $4,300, which is unnervingly accurate.

At dinner at the Ojai House, Justin confronts Robert about all the secrecy and his medication. Robert says that he's been having more complications with his heart. Justin feels like he can't keep all of this a secret. So Robert asks for the key back because he can't trust Justin. Before Robert gets the key, they're interrupted for dinner. At dinner, Robert starts feeling dizzy and asks for an ambulance. At the hospital, Robert finally tells Kitty what he's been up to. On the car ride home, Kitty tells him that he should release the tapes to get at Stanton.

In the final scene, Kitty and Robert's car hits a truck. Kitty is okay, but Robert is hurt badly. She calls for Justin, but Robert tells Justin to go help Holly and that he'll wait for the ambulance. Robert is fading, and Kitty tells him to talk to her. He tells her that she was right about his being afraid that he couldn't keep up with Evan after his heart attack. He tells Kitty how strong she was when she held Evan in his arms. Robert begins to fade, and then he stops talking and it ends with him in a coma.

=== Justin & Rebecca ===
Justin begins an accelerated medical school program and is paired with a highly intelligent, but socially challenged, lab-partner named Carter who makes Justin feel bad for not doing as well in school because of Justin's family obligations. As Justin and Rebecca prepare for their wedding, their relationship becomes strained when she discovers she's pregnant. Seeing the pressure he is already under from his studies, Rebecca initially decides not tell him but finally does just as he finds out he has not done well on his mid-term exams and is put on academic probation. During his bachelor party, Justin breaks and drinks a glass of champagne, rows with Kevin and storms out while Robert tells the other Walkers that Rebecca is pregnant and that they should support Justin. At Nora's, Justin confides in Rebecca that he had a drink and is worried he is out of control of his addiction. At a Narcotics Anonymous meeting, he confides that he is having his own doubts about marriage and fatherhood but loves Rebecca, not knowing that her father is in the back of the room. Justin does not show up to the wedding rehearsal leaving Rebecca thinking he has changed his mind. In fact, he witnesses a small boy being hit by a car and goes to his rescue which makes him realize how much he wants to be a father and her husband, and rushes home to tell her this. They are later just about to be married when Kitty collapses at their wedding.

Soon after this Rebecca suffers a miscarriage, devastating her and causing a rift between her and Justin when she avoids spending time with him and talking about what happened. But, after they begin to communicate they become close and move past losing their baby. While investigating Narrow Lake with Holly, Justin sees a Marriage Hall and tells Rebecca they should get married right there and then because after everything that's happened, he doesn't want to wait any longer. They spend their honeymoon at the Ojai Ranch, where the entire family turns up to celebrate.

After discovering one of his friends went back to the war and was killed, Justin begins to feel uncertain about his future in medicine and tells Rebecca he wants to feel part of a team, as he did when he was a soldier. This leads to Justin suggesting they move to Haiti for a year with a medical student program, allowing him to help those in need and Rebecca to continue her passion for photography. Rebecca, however receives a job offer at one of Ojai's rival companies following the closing of Ojai.

Rebecca tells Justin that she accepted the job offer. Justin feels that Rebecca has made the decision for them not to go to Haiti. Rebecca suggests that as a compromise, she could stay here and Justin go to Haiti for a year, but Justin says as newlyweds they should be together. After dinner at the Ojai House, Justin asks Rebecca if she was serious, and she says yes. She wants them both to be happy and not resent each other. In the final scene, Justin and Rebecca are the last to arrive at the car pile-up. Justin rushes around to help as many people as he can, while Rebecca looks for Holly. She finds Nora who tells her she can't get Holly out the car. Rebecca calls Justin over as he attempts to help Robert. He's able to wake up Holly, and wrap his jacket around her.

=== Sarah ===
Sarah is briefly seen in the premiere explaining she has endured a terrible summer of online dating and retreated to France for a much-needed vacation. She lands back in California with a new French beau, Luc, who helps her question her view on men and relationships. After living together for a short time, he decides to leave again after realizing his free-spirited attitude and her corporate and family lifestyle do not work together. Sarah then meets a single dad at Paige's science fair and the two hit it off. Just as their romance heats up, Sarah receives contact from Luc and realizes she still has feelings for him. After ending things with Roy, she and Luc resume their relationship which hits yet another obstacle as Luc finds it difficult to renew his visa and faces being deported. In the episode "Where There's Smoke", Luc wins the lottery to get a green card, however now that their lives have become real the couple begin to have problems, especially concerning Cooper who has been acting out. Luc tells Sarah he needs to define his own relationship with the kids.

Sarah is depressed after Ojai closes. She sits on her couch for three days eating pizza. Nora has her go on the campaign bus with her and Kitty. Throughout it, Sarah drinks wine and watches soap operas. Later, Sarah gets a call from Holly and they sit down and discover the water main at Narrow Lake, which she, Nora, and Holly have ownership of. Ojai will now be a water company. In the final crash scene, Sarah is shown to be okay and calls 911.

=== Tommy ===
Tommy comes home from Mexico and reveals he and Julia are getting a divorce and he has not spoken to Elizabeth in months. After talking to Kitty and his mother, he decides to go to Seattle to restore his relationship with his daughter. He briefly returns with Elizabeth, breaking the terms of his custody agreement by crossing the state-border for Justin's wedding. Kevin contacts Julia and tells her what Tommy has done and convinces Julia not to call the police. But, then Julia turns up at the Walker house during the wedding rehearsal and demands that Elizabeth leave with her because she cannot trust Tommy anymore. She stays with Kevin and Scotty for the night and relents, allowing them to take Elizabeth to the wedding and see Tommy.

Tommy returns once again and stays with his mother as he helps her deal with Dennis York. After Tommy tries to extract information from York, along with Kevin and Justin, York retracts his offer. Tommy helps the rest of the family sell off Ojai assets and, with Sarah, organizes its closure.

=== Ryan ===
Ryan begins the season plotting with Dennis York to bring down Ojai so Ryan could get revenge on William for what he believed William did to his mother. Ryan sabotages the wine storage machines, thereby destroying Ojai's award-winning product and making it impossible for the company to be saved from financial ruin. Ryan is caught by Holly, who threatens to turn him into the police. However, Saul intervenes and Ryan is spared from criminal charges. Ryan's last storyline involves him donating his bone marrow to Kitty after she collapses at Justin and Rebecca's wedding, and attempting to come to peace with the Walkers. The character's last appearance is in "A Bone to Pick," and following that episode the character vanishes without explanation. In an April 2010 interview, David Marshall Grant, the Brothers and Sisters show runner, stated the Ryan character was not working within the context of the show, and the character would not be returning.

=== Ojai Foods ===
Holly discovers most of her financial investments have vanished, due to a fraud scandal and she is thus much less wealthy than she thought. This position leaves Ojai in trouble, so she suggests creating a new low-priced wine called Coastal Reserve to save the company. Dennis York, a man from William Walker's past, persuades Ryan, who is still furious with William, to join him in gaining control of Ojai behind the Walker family's back. Ryan shares confidential information with Dennis and destroys the stock of the new wine. After discovering this, Holly begins questioning why Dennis would want to take over a financially struggling company, leading her to investigate the true value of Ojai.

Dennis York blackmails Nora into convincing her children to sell Ojai to him, which leads Nora to join Holly in investigating the company's hidden worth. Rebecca gives the company her $2 million savings giving the family time to discover the secret. Although the family begins to agree it may be time to sell and let go of the company, Dennis York retracts his offer. Ojai is officially closed in the episode "Lights Out," but at the same time, Nora and Sarah find plans which show that William was planning on building a house for Nora on Narrow Lake. Nora pays for a few days further drilling at Narrow Lake and, in the season finale, they discover a large water reserve.

== Episodes ==
No. overall	No. in season	Title	Directed by	Written by	Original release date	US viewers (millions)
64	1	"The Road Ahead"	Ken Olin	Molly Newman & Marjorie David	September 27, 2009	9.38
Kitty harbors a devastating secret that will rock the Walker family. Ida Holden, Nora and Saul's mother, returns. Meanwhile, Nora and Holly begrudgingly team up to throw an elaborate engagement party for Justin and Rebecca, Tommy continues his personal spiritual journey in Mexico, and Sarah searches for new business prospects in France.
65	2	"Breaking the News"	Ken Olin	David Marshall Grant & Cliff Olin	October 4, 2009	9.65
As Robert worries about news of his recent heart attack leaking to the press, Kitty struggles with an untold secret that will deeply affect their marriage and bring the Walker family together like never before. Meanwhile, Kevin and Scotty discuss the real possibility and challenge of surrogacy.
66	3	"Almost Normal"	Michael Schultz	Jennifer Levin & Sherri Cooper-Landsman	October 11, 2009	8.97
Kitty, Robert and Nora struggle to accept Kitty's cancer and to come to an agreement on the best possible treatment, but as they prepare to share the news with the entire family, a surprise visitor from afar makes the burden a bit easier to bear.
67	4	"From France With Love"	Michael Morris	Sarah Goldfinger & Michael Foley	October 18, 2009	9.72
Having just returned from France, Sarah distracts Kitty through chemo treatments with tales of her intense romance with a French artist (Gilles Marini as Luc Laurent). Meanwhile, Justin struggles with his first anatomy class and seeks advice from his professor (guest starring Joe Morton as Professor Peter Madsen) about how to survive the semester with his genius teenage lab partner.
68	5	"Last Tango in Pasadena"	Bethany Rooney	Molly Newman & Jason Wilborn	October 25, 2009	9.97
The entire Walker family, except Nora, are literally swept off their feet by the charms and tango lessons of Sarah's new lover, Luc Laurent (Gilles Marini). But Nora quickly finds that her new French houseguest is a great comfort during a very difficult time. Meanwhile, Robert puts forth his most romantic efforts to distract Kitty from cancer, and Kevin and Scotty stumble on an unexpected surrogacy candidate.
69	6	"Zen & the Art of Making Mole"	Michael Schultz	Brian Studler & Geoffrey Nauffts	November 1, 2009	9.47
In the throes of chemo, Kitty is thrilled when a surprise visitor comes to town, while Sarah finally realizes that she has to tell her kids about Luc (Gilles Marini as Luc Laurent). Meanwhile, with Ryan and Rebecca's help, Holly finds a way to keep her financial future from unraveling, and Kevin and Scotty finally agree on a possible surrogate.
70	7	"The Wig Party"	Ken Olin	Marjorie David & David Marshall Grant	November 8, 2009	9.08
Kitty is devastated when she is faced with the visible ramifications of her cancer treatment, Nora makes a surprising friend with benefits, Rebecca discovers that she is pregnant and Scotty takes stock when his father delivers some shocking news about his marriage.
71	8	"The Wine Festival"	Michael Morris	Sherri Cooper-Landsman & Michael Foley	November 15, 2009	10.08
When Ojai's newest wine is submitted at a local festival, the family hold their breath as they wait to see if the company can be saved. Meanwhile, Justin and Rebecca harbor life-changing secrets from one another, Nora has a secret crush on a younger man (Jon Tenney as Simon), while Sarah and Luc discover that they may not be as compatible as they had hoped.
72	9	"Pregnant Pause"	Matthew Rhys	Sarah Goldfinger & Jennifer Levin	November 29, 2009	8.69
Rebecca has a secret that could make or break her relationship with Justin; Holly's financial situation worsens; Sarah becomes jealous of Nora's new romance.
73	10	"Nearlyweds"	Laura Innes	Michael J. Cinquemani & Molly Newman	December 6, 2009	10.81
Justin and Rebecca's beachside wedding has the Walker family stunned. Tommy risks everything to have his daughter beside him.
74	11	"A Bone to Pick"	Chad Lowe	Cliff Olin & Brian Studler	January 3, 2010	10.78
Kitty's collapse at the beach was caused by a clot in her lung. Medicine has cleared it, but there's still the issue of her tumors. Her best option is a bone marrow transplant. They just have to find a marrow match. Note: This is Ryan Lafferty's last appearance, though Luke Grimes is credited for the role throughout the remainder of the season.
75	12	"The Science Fair"	Laura Innes	Monica Owusu-Breen & Alison Schapker	January 10, 2010	10.45
A divorced dad at Paige's school piques Sarah's interest, while Justin slowly but surely finds the key to his learning challenges.
76	13	"Run Baby Run"	Richard Coad	Marjorie David & Jason Wilborn	January 17, 2010	7.97
Sarah has a new romantic interest who is divorced; Scotty and Kevin await the results of their first try at surrogacy; Kitty and Robert reach another impasse over politics.
77	14	"The Pasadena Primary"	Jonathan Kaplan	Michael Foley & Geoffrey Nauftts	January 31, 2010	7.65
Robert and Nora get to work as guest chefs in Scotty's struggling restaurant to boost business, Kitty puts her idea to run for Robert's senate seat up for a Walker family vote, and Sarah reaches a point of frustration with Roy but is quickly rewarded for speaking up.
78	15	"A Valued Family"	Michael Schultz	Sarah Goldfinger & Michael Cinquemani	February 21, 2010	7.85
The Walker family shares love and loss on Valentine's Day as Sarah rediscovers the love of her life (guest starring Gilles Marini as Luc Laurent), Kitty makes a grand but heartfelt entree into politics with her family and new campaign manager by her side (guest starring Cheryl Hines as Buffy), Justin and Rebecca face the struggles of impending parenthood and Holly makes a tough decision about what to do with her shares of Ojai.
79	16	"Leap of Faith"	Michael Morris	Matt Donnelly & Marc Halsey	February 28, 2010	7.92
Luc's visa issues cause monumental problems for Sarah, who not only struggles with her feelings for him, but worries that she might lose him again – this time to another woman. Meanwhile, Rebecca wrestles with Justin and with herself to move on after a huge loss, Kevin discovers breaking up with Robert is hard to do, and Holly thinks she has found the hidden value of Ojai Foods.
80	17	"Freeluc.com"	Bethany Rooney	Molly Newman & Brian Studler	March 14, 2010	8.53
Kitty's newfound fame creates havoc for Luc and Sarah, as Luc faces possible deportation. Meanwhile, Nora swallows her pride and reaches out to Tommy to help her save the company from the Walkers' longtime nemesis, Dennis York.
81	18	"Time After Time"	Ken Olin	Sherri Cooper-Landsman & Jennifer Levin	April 11, 2010	8.84
82	19	"Time After Time"	Ken Olin	Alison Schapker & Monica Owusu-Breen	April 11, 2010	8.84
Part one of two. In an effort to get to the root of the secret that William's nemesis, Dennis York, holds over their heads, the Walkers recall their memories, both good and horrifying, of their family's days at Ojai Foods in 1986. Then, as they continue to flashback to their younger days, they finally recall the shocking secret and the shameful cover-up that led to York's power play, and are forced to deal with the remorse of a tragic event. Part two of two. While Kevin deals with the devastating childhood secret, Nora and Holly take an uncharacteristic trip, a la "Thelma & Louise," to search for answers about Ojai's hidden worth, and Justin and Rebecca finally get their happily ever after.
83	20	"If You Bake It He Will Come"	Bethany Rooney	Marjorie David & Cliff Olin	April 18, 2010	7.84
Still reeling from his discovery of Nora's buried secrets about his childhood, Kevin refuses to attend his own birthday party. Meanwhile Justin, Tommy and Kevin confront Dennis York.
84	21	"Where There's Smoke..."	Michael Morris	Michael Foley & Jason Wilborn	April 25, 2010	8.36
More than one member of the Walker family suspects she might be pregnant, Nora offers to take her aging mother in (Marion Ross) when it's discovered she has dementia, and Luc gets an exciting delivery in the mail.
85	22	"Love All"	Michael Schultz	Michael J. Cinquemani & Sarah Goldfinger	May 2, 2010	8.44
The Walkers seem to all being going through an adjustment period, as Cooper acts out against Sarah while Luc becomes a member of the family, Justin has trouble finding the same passion for medicine that he had while serving in Iraq, and Kevin struggles with his newfound unemployed status.
86	23	"Lights Out"	Michael Morris	Molly Newman & Brian Studler	May 9, 2010	8.18
The Walkers are heartbroken as they prepare to shut the doors of Ojai Foods for good, but new opportunities and secret alliances develop as a result of the family's loss.
87	24	"On The Road Again"	Ken Olin	David Marshall Grant & Geoffrey Nauffts	May 16, 2010	9.93
As the Walkers try to cope with the sadness and financial ruin that lingers as a result of the closure of Ojai Foods, they discover a small ray of hope in one of William Walker's many secret investments. Meanwhile, Robert's health and the safety of his family are compromised when he finds himself in way over his head in a subversive business deal. The episode ends with a car crash and Robert appearing to be dead.

== Ratings ==
The season average for the show was once again down from the previous season, averaging 9.48 million viewers.

Episode #	Title	Rating	Share	Rating/share (18–49)	Rank (18–49)	Viewers (millions)	Rank (viewers)	Ref.
64	"The Road Ahead"	6.4	11	3.0/8	38	9.38	30	
65	"Breaking the News"	6.5	11	3.2/8	32	9.65	29	
66	"Almost Normal"	6.0	10	3.0/8	33	8.97	30	
67	"From France with Love"	6.6	11	3.2/8	28	9.72	24	
68	"Last Tango in Pasadena"	6.8	11	3.3/9		9.97		
69	"Zen and the Art of Making Mole"	6.2	11	3.3/9	17	9.47	23	
70	"The Wig Party"	6.2	11	2.9/8	33	9.08	26	
71	"The Wine Festival"	6.7	11	3.2/8	32	10.08	28	
72	"Pregnant Pause"	5.8	10	2.9/8	26	8.69	30	
73	"Nearlyweds"	7.1	12	3.7/9	10	10.81	12	
74	"A Bone to Pick"	7.0	12	3.5/9		10.78		
75	"The Science Fair"	6.7	11	3.5/9	15	10.45	20	
76	"Run Baby Run"	5.4	9	2.6/7	32	7.97	36	
77	"The Pasadena Primary"	5.1	9	2.4/6	21	7.65	29	
78	"A Valued Family"	5.3	9	2.5/7	25	7.85	30	
79	"Leap of Faith"	5.3	9	2.5/7	24	7.92	29	
80	"FreeLuc.com"	5.7	10	2.4/7	40	8.53	31	
81/82	"Time After Time"	6.0	10	2.5/7	25	8.84	22	
83	"If You Bake It He Will Come"	5.3	9	2.2/6	35	7.84	26	
84	"Where There's Smoke..."	5.6	10	2.3/6	32	8.36	25	
85	"Love All"	5.6	10	2.4/7	31	8.44	28	
86	"Lights Out"	5.4	9	2.5/7	33	8.18	31	
87	"On the Road Again"	6.6	11	2.9/8	27	9.93	25	
