= Julia Walker (Brothers & Sisters) =

Fictional character from the television series Brothers & Sisters

- Brothers & Sisters character
- Sarah Jane Morris as Julia Walker
- Portrayed by: Sarah Jane Morris
- Duration: 2006–09
- First appearance: "Patriarchy"; 1x01, September 24, 2006
- Last appearance: "Nearlyweds"; 4x10, December 6, 2009
- Created by: Jon Robin Baitz
In-universe information
- Occupation: Teacher
- Parents: Ben Ridge; Beth Ridge
- Spouse: Tommy Walker
- Children: William Walker III (deceased); Elizabeth Walker

Julia Ridge Walker is a fictional character on the ABC television series Brothers & Sisters. She is portrayed by Sarah Jane Morris. A regular cast member on the series for the first three seasons, Julia's storylines revolved around her and her husband Tommy (Balthazar Getty) problems surrounding their daughter Elizabeth, who was Tommy's brother Kevin's (Matthew Rhys) child through a donation of sperm due to Tommy's infertility.

== Storylines ==
Introduced as the wife of Tommy Walker (Balthazar Getty), Julia and Tommy got married two years prior to the start of the series. Julia helps Tommy cope with the sudden death of his father, William (Tom Skerritt). Meanwhile, they are trying for a baby, but Tommy learns that he is infertile. Tommy asks his brother Kevin (Matthew Rhys) to give his sperm, but Kevin refuses. Tommy's younger brother, Justin (Dave Annable), offers, but Tommy is wary because of Justin's drug abuse. Finally, both Kevin and Justin donate sperm and they all agree that they will never find out who the biological father is. Julia and Tommy learn that she is pregnant with twins, but when Julia goes into labour early, she gives birth to a daughter, Elizabeth, and a son, William. William, being weak, could only survive if a transplant was taken from Elizabeth. This could have killed both children, so Julia and Tommy reluctantly chose to not have the transplant leading to William's death. In the beginning of Season 2, Julia sank into post-partum depression and blamed Tommy for William's death. Her parents visited and convinced her to take Elizabeth and stay with them. While she was gone, Tommy had an affair with his secretary at Walker Landing, Lena (Emily Rose). Julia herself had had a one-night encounter with a man, and the dual revelations led to some tension between husband and wife when Julia returned. Lena left her job, and Julia and Tommy pledged to make sure their marriage work.

In Season 3, Tommy gets involved in an illegal scheme to fire Holly Harper (Patricia Wettig) from Ojai Foods (with Walker Landing being merged into Ojai). Two years later, when Elizabeth's liver begins to fail, Tommy asks Kevin and Justin to take a paternity test so the biological father can donate a part of his liver. The test reveals that Kevin is the biological father and after the procedure, Elizabeth is saved. Holly finds out about the illegal scheme, and puts charges up against him. When Julia finds out about this and then finds out what he did was illegal, she does not allow him back into the house, so Tommy escapes to Mexico to avoid jail. The next day, Holly drops the charges against Tommy, so once Tommy's mother Nora (Sally Field) tells Julia about this, Julia invites Tommy back to live with her. However, Tommy decides to stay in Mexico, which angers Kevin. Kevin, being Elizabeth's father, gives Julia money to avoid her house being sold as Tommy, who handled all the bills, did not pay the mortgage. Nora offers Julia a job, but Julia decides to move to Seattle and takes a teaching job given by her friend. Nora and Kevin are against this, however after Nora talks to her brother Saul Holden (Ron Rifkin) she comes to terms with this, realizing that Julia has to move on with her life. After an emotional thanks to the Walker family, she leaves, taking Elizabeth. In Season 4, Tommy moves to Seattle to be with Elizabeth and he and Julia officially divorce. Julia re-appears in the episode "Nearlyweds" after Tommy takes Elizabeth to the wedding of Justin and Rebecca Harper (Emily VanCamp) without asking her. After Tommy takes Elizabeth, Julia attempts to take Lizzie back, but after a talk with Kevin and his partner Scotty Wandell (Luke Macfarlane) she agrees to let her stay for the wedding. After the wedding ends, she and Elizabeth go back to Seattle.

== Development ==
When Morris found out about her characters departure due to ABC's decision to not renew Getty's contract, she stated that she was "surprised" and "sad", but added that the "producers were great", and that she felt "fortunate" that Julia was not killed off. Of her reaction when she saw the script for "Julia", she added; "I was slightly nervous when I got the script and it was titled "Julia" because I thought, am I going to be in every second of this episode? It was fun to get an episode dedicated to my character, and they didn't do what I was expecting. Julia leaves Tommy and makes a choice for herself. I like seeing that from her because she hasn't been the "do things for herself" type of character until this moment". On the characters departure storyline she commented that she was "really happy". "It was a nice farewell, but it was very sad. The one particular day when I had to shoot the dinner and toast the family, I was crying all day". However, Morris did say that she did feel that some aspects of the character were "swept under the rug", adding that it was "unfortunate". "When it came out that both of us had had affairs, there was a scene when Julia says they needed help with their marriage. The show had already done the therapy storyline with Joe (John Pyper-Ferguson) and Sarah, so I get that they didn't want to go there again. But you never got to see them work through their problems. Also being new parents and the whole fertility story got rushed and crammed into one episode". She however did praise the expansion of her character from her affair adding that it is "always more interesting to play someone flawed than someone perfect". "When I first read it, I thought it was an easy way to keep them together, but at the same time, it was realistic that two people could go through something like that. People don't really talk about what happens when both cheat". Finally, Morris added that the character of Julia could return, but the character needed "reinvent[ing]". However, Julia never returned, as Brothers & Sisters ended in 2011.

== Reception ==
Enid Portuguez of Los Angeles Times reviewed Julia's last main appearance in the episode "Julia";

I'm glad Julia - for three seasons the show's most underused character - stood her ground and made her own strong choices. Tommy and Julia had juicy plot lines involving infertility, infidelity and the loss of a child, but their story often took the backseat to Kitty (Calista Flockhart), Sarah (Rachel Griffiths) and Kevin's. Julia filled a chair at the Walker dinner table, but in contrast to Scotty and Robert (Rob Lowe), we never really got a glimpse of who she was outside of Tommy's wife and Elizabeth's mother. I had completely forgotten she was a teacher until she mentioned it last night. We knew she was just as flawed as her husband (she cheated on Tommy during their separation last season), but that story got swept under the rug along with her personality. It was refreshing to see Julia finally exerting some independence and standing up to the Walkers; unfortunately, it was too late.

— Enid Portuguez

TV Guide's Adam Bryant called Julia's exit scenes "sad" but added "she hasn't had much to do lately and with Balthazar Getty's screen time reduced, it was only a matter of time until Julia went".
