= 36 Hours =

36 Hours may refer to:

- 36 Hours (1953 film), a British film noir
- 36 Hours (1964 film), an American World War II film
- "36 Hours" (Brothers & Sisters episode), an episode of the television series Brothers & Sisters
- "36 Hours", an episode of The Good Doctor
- 36 Ghante, a 1974 Indian Hindi-language film
- Motu Patlu: 36 Ghante Race, a 2016 Indian animated film, see Motu Patlu
