= Brothers & Sisters season 5 =

Brothers & Sisters
- Season 5
- DVD cover
- No. of episodes: 22

Release
- Original network: ABC
- Original release: September 26, 2010 – May 8, 2011

Season chronology
- ← Previous; Season 4

The fifth and final season of Brothers & Sisters premiered on September 26, 2010, and concluded May 8, 2011. Season five takes place one year after the events of the season four finale "On the Road Again". This season featured the show's 100th episode with the airing of episode 13.

The show stars Sally Field, Dave Annable, Rachel Griffiths, Calista Flockhart, Matthew Rhys, Ron Rifkin, Patricia Wettig, Luke Macfarlane, and Gilles Marini.

The season was originally set to only feature 18 episodes to make way for new drama Off the Map in mid-season. However, on October 25, 2010, it was announced that ABC had picked up four more episodes, bringing the season to 22 episodes in total. The series' cancellation was announced on May 13, 2011.

== Cast ==
Gilles Marini, who portrayed Luc, was upgraded to a series regular.

There were several cast changes in 2011, with the departures of Rob Lowe, whose character Robert McCallister (Kitty's husband) died in the car crash that ended season 4, and of Luke Grimes, who played Ryan Lafferty, William Walker's illegitimate son. Gilles Marini, who played Luc Laurent, Sarah's boyfriend, was also upgraded to a series regular. Additionally, Kerris Lilla Dorsey and Maxwell Perry Cotton, the actors who portrayed Sarah Walker's children, Paige and Cooper, respectively, were downgraded to recurring status.

ABC considered bringing back Balthazar Getty's character Tommy Walker full-time for the fifth season, but it was later announced that Getty would return for several episodes, the first of which would be the show's 100th episode.

Emily VanCamp left the show and only appeared in two episodes during the fifth season to close out her character's storyline. Patricia Wettig left the show mid-season after her character Holly Harper followed her daughter to New York.

Beau Bridges was cast as Nick Brody; Nora's high school flame. He signed on for at least five episodes and will first appear in the middle of the season. It was announced that Ida Holden (Marion Ross), mother of Saul and Nora, would die off-screen without appearing in any of the last season's episodes.

=== Main ===
- Dave Annable as Justin Walker
- Sally Field as Nora Walker
- Calista Flockhart as Kitty Walker
- Rachel Griffiths as Sarah Walker
- Luke Macfarlane as Scotty Wandell
- Gilles Marini as Luc Laurent
- Matthew Rhys as Kevin Walker
- Ron Rifkin as Saul Holden
- Patricia Wettig as Holly Harper (episodes 1–12)

=== Recurring and notable guest stars ===
- Sônia Braga as Gabriella Laurent, Luc's mother
- Balthazar Getty as Tommy Walker
- Emily VanCamp as Rebecca Harper
- Kerris Dorsey as Paige Whedon
- Maxwell Perry Cotton as Cooper Whedon
- Cara Buono as Rose, Tommy's fiancée
- Stephen Collins as Charlie
- Jeremy Davidson as Jack Randall, Kitty's new love interest
- Ken Olin as David Caplan
- Daniel and David Oshionebo as Evan Walker McCallister
- Odette Yustman as Annie, Justin's new love interest
- Ryan Devlin as Seth, a grad student at Kitty's college
- Richard Chamberlain as Jonathan, Saul's ex-boyfriend
- Rob Kazinsky as Rick, Annie's ex-boyfriend
- John Terry as Karl West, Nora's new love interest
- Beau Bridges as Nick Brody, Nora's former boyfriend
- Guillaume Dabinpons as Guillaume Dabinpons
- Isabella Rae Thomas as Olivia, Scotty and Kevin's adopted daughter
- Marika Dominczyk as Tyler Altamirano, Justin's former and new love interest

== Storylines ==
This season picks up a year after the events of the previous season finale revealing what has happened since the events of "On The Road Again," such as whether Robert survived the car crash and how Saul is dealing with life after discovering he is HIV positive.

=== Nora ===
Nora begins the season secretly working as a florist as she feels she needs a new purpose in her life. Due to the events of the previous season, Nora hasn't been giving her opinions and advice to her family. After finally regaining her confidence, she quits her job and helps set straight her children, all of whom are going through various problems. A man witnessing this asks her to audition for a new radio show giving motherly advice. Although she is initially intimidated by competing against a well-known psychiatrist, Nora wins the show after Kevin and Kitty call in with their problems. After working at the radio station for a while, Nora begins dating a radio psychologist named Karl. Although they start off happy together, they eventually end their relationship after Karl finds it hard to deal with the rest of the Walkers and how close the family always seems to be.

After Tommy's new partner Rose begins creating the Walker family tree, Nora begins to think back and feeling begin to resurface for her old flame Brody whom she left to marry William. Rose's information also makes Sarah temporarily question her paternity, so much so that she gets in contact with Brody who then turns up on Nora's doorstep. Although she is initially reluctant to speak to him she finds herself enjoying his company until she realises the reason she left him in the first place was because of his inability to commit. She realises he is still the same but that she doesn't blame him for that. Brody leaves again but asks Nora to take care of his dog, he returns a few weeks later, the same day that Nora discovers that her mother has died. Brody helps Nora deal with unresolved issues with her mother and she asks him to stay so that they can be together. After admitting to Justin that he lied about his blood type and therefore the possibility that he could be Sarah's father he decides to leave. Once Nora discovers this she and Justin carry out a secret paternity test and after it comes back positive decide to tell Sarah the truth, but after Sarah admits this doesn't change her feelings and wants to nothing to do with him Nora decides not to tell Brody. After Sarah discovers that Brody is her father he comes to win back Nora. At first she tries to stay away from him because of Sarah she can't help but give into her feelings for him. Although angry to begin with, on her wedding day Sarah connects with Brody and gives her parents her blessing. Nora ends the season looking over her new extended family happy with her life.

=== Kitty ===
Kitty begins the season refusing to leave the side of a comatose Robert, convinced he'll wake up, despite the rest of the family's doubts. She finally decides to say goodbye after encouragement from Justin. After this, she decides to rent a cottage in Ojai to rediscover herself. She meets and begins to date a local man named Jack, who reveals he was once a corporate banker in the city and left for the same reasons she did. After she moves back to the city, Kitty is happy when Jack follows to be with her; however, it soon becomes clear that he isn't happy and they decide to end their relationship, acknowledging that they helped each other transition through difficult times in their lives.

Kitty begins teaching at Wexley University and meets a young graduate named Seth. Although hesitant at first, because he is only twenty-seven, Kitty begins dating Seth; however, their relationship becomes complicated when Kitty realizes Seth's mother is the dean of Wexley University and therefore Kitty's boss. Kitty ends her relationship with Seth when she goes to DC, under the pretense of business meetings. However, after following her there, Nora and Sarah discover that she has been seeing a specialist due to complications from her bone marrow transplant. She assures them that the treatment has worked and returns home with them to celebrate Evan's fourth birthday. Upon returning Kitty and Seth decide to give their relationship another try and take a trip to Boston together. However Kitty returns to support Sarah after discovering Brody is her real father and to help her plan her wedding. Later, it is revealed that Kitty is pregnant and she is very happy about it. But Nora and Seth are worried because of her previous experiences with cancer. In the end, it seems that Kitty has decided to continue with her pregnancy.

=== Kevin & Scotty ===
Since the end of the last season and their surrogacy plans falling through, Kevin has been distant from Scotty and has kept himself busy with work. Scotty admits to having a one-night stand with another man and Kevin begins sleeping on the sofa downstairs. Once the entire family discover what has happened, Kevin becomes angry but also admits that he wasn't there for Scotty when he needed him, thus he is partly to blame for what has happened to their marriage. Kevin decides to stay with Kitty for a while. Paige gets Kevin and Scotty to finally discuss what has been going on with their relationship and after talking they mend their relationship.

The two then decide to try adoption, as they realise what they want most is to be parents, not to pass on their genes. Subsequently, they begin spending time with a young girl, Olivia, in foster care. After spending time with her, Olivia begins to withdraw and they discover that she cannot read and was too afraid to tell them. They pay for her to have a tutor and eventually officially adopt her. She is introduced to the rest of the Walkers at Evan's birthday party where she begins to become close to her cousin Paige. After her older brother returns Kevin and Scotty must fight for their right to keep custody of Olivia. Although they are successful they ask her brother to dinner so that he can keep a close relationship with his sister. Scotty bumps into Michelle who is acting strangely and tries to talk to her after months of no contact. When he and Kevin see her at the airport with a baby they get the police involved realizing it is their child. Michelle calls Scotty and tells him she wants to stay involved as his mother but when Kevin reminds her that she has no right or relation she gives back their son Daniel. Olivia has some trouble accepting Daniel into the family but in the end accepts her baby brother.

=== Sarah & Luc ===
Sarah is having trouble with Luc's busy and glamorous new career and begins to feel old around him; however, they become engaged at the end of episode five. After selling off the land discovered in the season four finale, Sarah decides to get back into business and uses her share of money to buy a large media company. She admits that part of her decision was that the company owns the radio station where Nora works, effectively making Sarah her boss. Sarah also has issues with Paige, as she continues to act out going as far as to drinking alcohol with her friend during a party for Luc. She is also becomes jealous of how much Paige and Coop look up to Luc and see him as a friend, although she later admits that to be a good parent she can't always be her children's friend.

After Tommy's fiance Rose digs into the Walker's family tree, she discovers that Nora and William lied about their wedding date because Nora was already pregnant with Sarah. Sarah begins to question her paternity and gets in contact with her mother's old flame Brody to discover the truth. After finding out that William is her father she and Nora ask Rose to stop digging into their past. When Brody returns, he admits to Justin that he lied about his blood type, he has the same one as William, meaning that he could also be Sarah's father. Brody makes Justin swear not to tell, but he eventually tells Nora. They sneak around, trying to get some of Sarah's DNA to test. They get the results which reveals that Brody is Sarah's biological father. Sarah doesn't want anything to do with Brody and still views William as her father. Sarah takes a walk before her wedding and discovers Brody sitting in his RV outside the church. They talk and Brody tells her that he was at her high school graduation and various other milestones in her life. Sarah asks Brody to walk her down the aisle. It is revealed that Brody has four other children, including Lori-Lynn who comes to Sarah's wedding unannounced.

=== Justin ===
Justin returns home to find Rebecca has moved out of their home and reveals to everyone that they had divorced while he was away. Although they spend another night together, Rebecca decides, after being offered a photography job in New York and problems with her mother, that it's time for her to move away, leaving Justin heartbroken. Justin is also the one to help Kitty move on and say goodbye to Robert. Later, after beginning work as a paramedic, Justin meets a nurse, Annie (played by Dave Annable's real-life wife, Odette Yustman) and they begin to date. Problems arise when Annie's ex-boyfriend, Dr. Rick, comes along and Justin becomes jealous. After a fight with Dr. Rick during the staff baseball game, Justin breaks up with her, telling her that he doesn't think she's over Dr. Rick.

Later Justin meets Zach, an ex-marine, living on the streets and takes it upon himself help him sort out his life by letting him stay in his house and getting him a job in Scotty's restaurant. It soon becomes clear after spending his time trying to help everyone else that Justin needs to focus on sorting out his own life and Zach moves out thanking Justin for what he has done. When he and Luc check bookings at a hotel for Luc's friends visiting for his bachelor party Justin bumps into his old love Tyler. Justin asks if she would like to meet up and although she is hesitant at first Tyler explains that she is married but separated. Justin opens up about his own divorce and the two share a kiss. He later begins to think their relationship is too complicated because Tyler's work colleagues think she is still happily married until she tells Justin that she wants to be with him.

=== Holly ===
Holly is revealed to have survived the car crash and now has a severe case of amnesia. When Nora drops by, Holly is suspicious of her, thinking William is still alive and doesn't remember their friendship. Holly cannot remember Rebecca, however, once she realizes she is her daughter, she tells her that although she now remembers her she does not feel anything towards her. This contributes to Rebecca's decision to move to New York. David wants to move back to New York to teach but Holly is unsure about leaving and worries that she will never be a real mother to Rebecca. After spending time with Nora, she realizes she has a chance to forget the past and begin a new life and so she leaves to be with David and Rebecca.

=== Saul ===
Saul deals with being HIV positive and coming to terms with how this affects his love life. Although he begins dating someone early in the season, this ends when he reveals his HIV status. Late, he begins dating a man named Johnathan. During Sarah's wedding, Saul's boyfriend asks him to marry him and he agrees. After his mother dies, he discovers that she knew he was gay and hoped he was happy leaving him with closure around their relationship.

Throughout the season, Saul also works with Scotty to open and run their restaurant Cafe 429.

=== Tommy ===
In the 100th episode, he returns with his fiancee Rose. Rose digs into the Walker's family tree, and she discovers that Nora and William lied about their wedding date because Nora was already pregnant with Sarah. She brings up Brody, Nora's ex-boyfriend that she dated before William. It was because of her that Sarah questioned her paternity, so much so that Sarah got in contact with Brody who then turns up on Nora's doorstep.

He left for Phoenix with Rose for a new job.

== Episodes ==
No. overall	No. in season	Title	Directed by	Written by	Original release date	US viewers (millions)
88	1	"Homecoming"	Michael Morris	David Marshall Grant & David Babcock	September 26, 2010	9.49
A year has passed since the road accident and a lot has changed for the Walkers. Justin has spent the year in the army leaving Rebecca alone to deal with her mother who has amnesia. Robert is in a coma, but Kitty refuses to let him go. Kevin and Scotty are distant after their surrogate loses their baby. Sarah is throwing herself into work and Nora is refusing to get involved in her children's problems. With Justin and Nora encouraging her, Kitty makes a final decision about Robert.
89	2	"Brief Encounter"	Jonathan Kaplan	Molly Newman	October 3, 2010	9.17
The Walkers attend a party for Luc's ad campaign. Sarah is feeling distant from Paige. Kevin must deal with a runaway teenager. Kitty becomes suspicious of her mother's behavior and begins to think she's having a secret relationship...with a woman.
90	3	"Faking It"	Michael Schultz	Veronica Becker & Geoffrey Nauffts	October 10, 2010	8.90
Kitty meets Jack, a handyman, while staying in Ojai. Sarah is desperate to hide the fact that she is turning 40 from Luc, to whom she lied to about her age. Rebecca and Justin reunite for a short discussion about what Justin said to Rebecca's mother. While Rebecca meets with her mother which causes her to lose memory again.
91	4	"A Righteous Kiss"	Ken Olin	Cliff Olin & Stephen Tolkin	October 17, 2010	8.81
Holly has a breakdown. Justin and Rebecca make a big decision about their relationship and lives. Saul worries his latest relationship could be in trouble once he decides to tell him that he is HIV positive. Sarah takes charge of making costumes for Cooper's school play in the hopes of impressing the other moms.
92	5	"Call Mom"	Michael Schultz	Veronica Becker & Brian Studler	October 24, 2010	8.21
Nora auditions for a radio show offering advice to its callers and is up against Dr. Alex, a well-known author. Kevin turns up to offer his mother support. A lonely Justin visits Kitty in Ojai and finds her getting close to Jack, who ends up giving him advice on his feelings about Rebecca.
93	6	"An Ideal Husband"	Bethany Rooney	David Marshall Grant & Michael J. Cinquemani	October 31, 2010	8.15
Kevin is still reeling after Scotty's betrayal, but doesn't want his family to know about their problems. This becomes difficult after Sarah catches Kevin sleeping in his office. Justin bartends at a party and bumps into the man Scotty had his one-night stand with.
94	7	"Resolved"	Michael Schultz	David Babcock & Gina Lucita Monreal	November 7, 2010	8.70
Justin meets Annie, a nurse, while taking Holly to the hospital. Kevin isn't willing to talk to Scotty, but the two are forced to spend time together after Paige asks for their help with a school debate.
95	8	"The Rhapsody Of The Flesh"	Matthew Rhys	Molly Newman	November 14, 2010	8.69
Luc's mother arrives in town and although Sarah is excited, Luc isn't happy to see his mother. Nora invites Dr. Karl around for a date.
96	9	"Get A Room"	Eli Craig	Marc Halsey & Matt Donnelly	December 5, 2010	7.59
Sarah treats Luc to a night in a hotel before he leaves for a job, but Nora & Karl end up in the same hotel on the same night. As does Kitty and a young graduate student named Seth, who she meets in a coffee shop. Kevin gets nervous as his and Scotty's appointment with the adoption agency draws closer.
97	10	"Cold Turkey"	Michael Morris	Stephen Tolkin & Geoffrey Nauffts	December 12, 2010	8.76
Nora decides to go away with Karl for Christmas, leading to Kitty and Kevin warring over who hosts the family celebrations. Saul bumps into an old flame who may have been responsible for giving him HIV and Sarah becomes depressed as her kids are away with Joe and Luc is away with work.
98	11	"Scandalized"	Bethany Rooney	Veronica Becker & Sarah Kucserka	January 2, 2011	7.85
Kevin and Scotty decide to adopt. Kitty's and Seth's relationship becomes public knowledge. Karl has trouble accepting how close Nora and her children are. All these issues come to a head at a family dinner.
99	12	"Thanks For The Memories"	Michael Mayers	Cliff Olin & Brian Studler	January 9, 2011	8.25
Kitty tells Sarah she is considering going back into politics. Scotty and Kevin hit trouble while spending time with Olivia. Nora asks Holly to move in with her for a couple days while she decides whether she's ready to move to New York with David. Sarah has trouble when she discovers Paige has been secretly seeing a boy from school. Jonathan seeks forgiveness from Saul. Nora discovers William had her followed before they were married.
100	13	"Safe At Home"	Richard Coad	Michael J. Cinquemani & John Kazlauskas	January 16, 2011	7.07
Tommy returns with a big surprise for the Walker family. Sarah announces the wedding date. Justin and Annie have trouble and decide to just be friends, even though they still have feelings for each other. Olivia becomes part of the Walker family. Tommy and his fiancee, Rose, find out some strange information about Nora. The information may cause a big strain on the Walker family.
101	14	"The One That Got Away"	Michael Morris	Gina Lucia Monreal & David Babcock	February 13, 2011	6.27
The Walkers' plans to celebrate Valentine's Day go horribly wrong when Tommy tells Sarah about another secret that Nora has kept buried since they were kids, and Saul's hopes for a romantic evening with Jonathan (Richard Chamberlain) are dashed by a visiting high profile food critic.
102	15	"Brody"	Matthew Rhys	Molly Newman	February 20, 2011	6.77
Though Nora tries her best to keep Brody (guest starring Beau Bridges) at bay, she can't help but feel the long lost connection between them, and Justin reaches out to a homeless vet reluctant to accept help getting back on his feet.
103	16	"Home Is Where the Fort Is"	Bethany Rooney	Geoffrey Nauffts & Brian Studler	March 6, 2011	7.37
Nora and Sarah head to DC to discover why Kitty has yet to return home. Kevin and Scotty finally welcome Olivia into their family and Justin may be pushing himself to the limit trying to help out Zach.
104	17	"Olivia's Choice"	Michael Morris	Cliff Olin & Stephen Tolkin	April 10, 2011	6.59
Olivia's brother fights for custody after revealing he doesn't believe two men should raise a child. The judge however, rules that she stay with Kevin and Scotty. Sarah convinces Kitty and Seth to give their relationship another try. Nora panics when she loses Lily and Justin tries to make her admit to her feelings about Brody.
105	18	"Never Say Never"	Bethany Rooney	Sarah Kucserka & Veronica Becker	April 10, 2011	6.43
Ida dies leaving Saul and Nora struggling with unresolved issues with their mother. Brody returns and tries to help Nora accept how she is feeling. Sarah and Luc clash over planning their wedding, Justin feels lonely as his 30th birthday approaches and Scotty's mother visits so she can finally meet Olivia.
106	19	"Wouldn't It Be Nice"	Ken Olin	Michael J. Cinquemani & Marc Halsey	April 17, 2011	6.32
With Luc's first solo art show coming up Sarah thinks it's time to sell up and find a bigger house but he disagrees. Nora finally tells Brody how she feels but after Justin discovers he lied about the possibility he is Sarah's father Brody decides to leave and swears Justin to secrecy. Scotty bumps into Michelle following months with no contact after her miscarriage. Along with Kevin he goes to see her but finds her leaving with a baby.
107	20	"Father Unknown"	Matthew Rhys	Molly Newman & Gina Lucita Monreal	April 24, 2011	6.55
Justin tells Nora that Brody lied about his blood type and the two of them set about doing a secret paternity test. Meanwhile, Sarah thinks her mother's strange behaviour is down to her heartbreak and plans to take her away. Luc and Saul prepare a surprise for the wedding. Also, Kevin and Scotty call the police in the hopes of tracking down their baby but Michelle tells Scotty she wants to stay involved. However after Kevin tells her she isn't his mother she hands over their son.
108	21	"For Better or for Worse"	Michael Morris	Stephen Tolkin & Matt Donnelly	May 1, 2011 (Note: This episode was interrupted on the east coast and pre-empted on the west coast due to the Osama bin Laden death coverage and was never rebroadcast.)	5.70
Sarah finds Brody to tell him she is his daughter but doesn't want him in her life, however this causes him to return and fight for Nora. Nora tells him she has to respect what Sarah wants but finds it hard to stay away. The truth about how William Walker manipulated Brody out of Nora's and Sarah's lives is revealed—but nobody seems anxious to tell Sarah the truth yet. Kitty returns to support her sister. Olivia struggles with baby Daniel and feel she is no longer needed by Kevin and Scotty. Whilst taking care of Luc's friends who have travelled from France for his bachelor party, Justin meets and reconnects with Tyler—who manages the hotel where the wedding reception will be held, and who has her hands full with Luc's libidinous friends and male relatives. Since Rebecca recently left Justin, their reunion is ironic, given that the last time Justin saw Tyler was the same night that Justin met Rebecca for the first time.
109	22	"Walker Down the Aisle"	Ken Olin	David Marshall Grant & David Babcock	May 8, 2011	7.18
The series finale is told by Nora in a flashback on her radio show: Kevin rushes around planning Sarah's wedding. Luc is disappointed his father doesn't attend and blames his mother—until she finally reveals a painful truth about his father's business affairs. Justin worries that his relationship with Tyler is too complicated until she tells him she wants to put him first. Kitty discovers she is pregnant but Seth is worried it could affect her health. Sarah becomes stressed about everyone else's problems until she talks and bonds with Brody leading her to ask him to give her away and give her blessing to his relationship with Nora. After Sarah and Luc are officially married, Saul and Jonathan decide to get married. One of Brody's four other children crashes the wedding. At the reception, Kitty and Seth accept whatever will be with her pregnancy, while Justin and Tyler finally become a couple again—as do Nora and Brody.

== Ratings ==
Episode #	Title	Rating	Share	Rating/share (18–49)	Rank (18–49)	Viewers (millions)	Rank (viewers)	Ref.
88	"Homecoming"	6.3	11	2.9/8	12	9.49	9	
89	"Brief Encounter"	6.0	10	3.0/8	13	9.17	11	
90	"Faking It"	6.0	10	2.7/7	11	8.90	9	
91	"A Righteous Kiss"	6.0	10	2.6/7	12	8.81	12	
92	"Call Mom"	5.7	9	2.5/6	10	8.21	11	
93	"An Ideal Husband"	5.6	9	2.3/6	12	8.15	13	
94	"Resolved"	5.9	10	2.5/7	13	8.70	10	
95	"The Rhapsody Of The Flesh"	6.4	10	2.5/7	13	8.69	12	
96	"Get A Room"	5.1	8	2.1/6	15	7.59	14	
97	"Cold Turkey"	5.9	10	2.5/6	13	8.76	11	
98	"Scandalized"	5.3	9	2.3/7	11	7.85	12	
99	"Thanks For The Memories"	TBA	TBA	2.2/6	13	8.25	12	
100	"Safe At Home"	4.7	8	2.0/5	12	7.07	9	
101	"The One That Got Away"	4.3	7	1.7/5	10	6.27	6	
102	"Brody"	4.6	8	1.9/5	12	6.77	8	
103	"Home Is Where the Fort Is"	5.0	9	2.1/6	11	7.37	9	
104	"Olivia's Choice"	TBA	TBA	1.8/5	11	6.59	9	
105	"Never Say Never"	TBA	TBA	1.8/5	11	6.43	10	
106	"Wouldn't It Be Nice"	4.2	7	1.7/7	10	6.32	9	
107	"Father Unknown"	4.3	7	1.9/5	6	6.55	9	
108	"For Better or For Worse"	3.8	6	1.6/4	13	5.70	11	
109	"Walker Down the Aisle"	4.9	8	1.9/5	11	7.18	6	
