= Monica Owusu-Breen =

American television producer

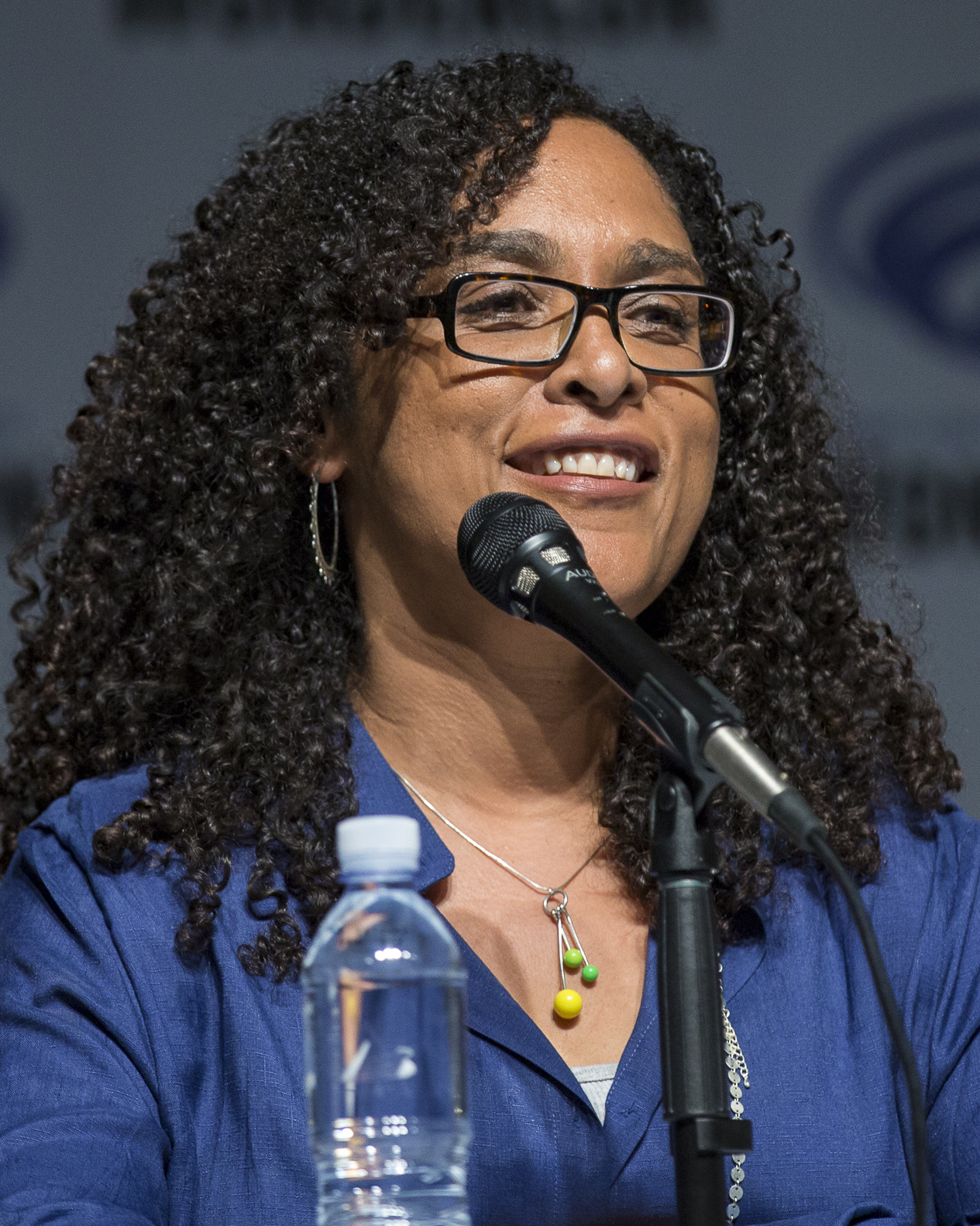
- Owusu-Breen at WonderCon 2017
- Born: Cornwall, England
- Education: Brown University; University of California, San Diego
- Occupations: Writer; producer
- Years active: 2001–present

Monica Owusu-Breen is an American television producer and screenwriter.

== Early life and education ==
Owusu-Breen has described herself as "half-Spanish, half Ghanaian". She was born in England and lived in Spain as a child, where she learned to speak English from watching television. She moved to Brooklyn with her family at the age of eight.

After graduating from Brown University, Owusu-Breen coordinated the production of music videos. She attended a PhD program at the University of California, San Diego and obtained a degree in television and media studies.

== Career ==
Owusu-Breen is known for her work on television series including Charmed, Alias, Brothers & Sisters, Lost and Fringe. She often collaborates with screenwriter Alison Schapker.

Her television career began when she was asked to write scripts as she was procrastinating while writing her PhD dissertation. This led, within two years, to a writer's position for Charmed. In the beginning of her career, Owusu-Breen chose to go only by "Breen" "just so no one made assumptions about anything" when she submitted scripts.

=== Alias ===
In 2003, Owusu-Breen joined the espionage action series Alias in its third season as an executive story editor and writer. At the beginning of season four, she was promoted to producer, And by the final season, she had been named supervising producer. During her three-season span, Owusu-Breen co-wrote eleven episodes total. The installments are as follows:

- "A Missing Link" (03.04) (co-written by executive story editor Alison Schapker)
- "After Six" (03.13) (co-written by Schapker)
- "Unveiled" (03.18) (co-written by Schapker)
- "Blood Ties" (03.20) (story co-written by Schapker, teleplay by co-producer J.R. Orci)
- "Détente" (04.07) (co-written by producer Schapker)
- "The Orphan" (04.12) (co-written by co-executive producer Jeffrey Bell)
- "Search and Rescue" (04.21) (co-written by Schapker)
- "Prophet Five" (05.01) (co-written by supervising producer Schapker)
- "Bob" (05.08) (co-written by Schapker)
- "30 Seconds" (05.13) (co-written by Schapker)
- "Reprisal" (05.16) (co-written by Schapker)

=== Brothers & Sisters ===
In 2006, Owusu-Breen was brought on to develop the first season of the ABC drama Brothers & Sisters, as a writer and supervising producer. She then went on to become co-executive producer at the beginning of season two, and then held the position of executive producer throughout seasons three and four. At the conclusion of the fourth season, Owusu-Breen left the series. The eleven episodes she co-wrote are as follows:

- "Sexual Politics" (01.12) (co-written with supervising producer Alison Schapker)
- "The Other Walker" (01.16) (co-written with Schapker)
- "Bad News" (01.20) (co-written with Schapker)
- "Home Front" (02.01) (co-written with co-executive producer Schapker)
- "Two Places" (02.06) (co-written with Schapker)
- "Holy Matrimony" (02.09) (co-written with Mark B. Perry and Schapker)
- "Prior Commitments" (02.16) (co-written with Schapker and co-executive producer Greg Berlanti)
- "Troubled Waters, Part 1" (03.16) (co-written by Sherri Cooper-Landsman)
- "Mexico" (03.24) (co-written with executive producer Schapker)
- "The Science Fair" (04.12) (co-written with Schapker)
- "Time After Time, Part Two" (04.19) (co-written with Schapker)

=== Lost ===
In Fall 2006, Owusu-Breen joined the third season crew of ABC's Lost, as a writer and supervising producer. She left the series in February 2007. She co-wrote one episode while working on the series, with supervising producer Alison Schapker, "The Cost of Living".

=== Fringe ===
After her departure from Brothers & Sisters in Spring 2010, Owusu-Breen was hired as a writer and co-executive producer on the FOX science fiction thriller Fringe. At the time, going into its third season. After the completion of the fourth season, Owusu-Breen departed the series. Episodes she contributed to included:

- "The Plateau" (03.03) (co-written by co-executive producer Alison Schapker)
- "Marionette" (03.09) (co-written by Schapker)
- "Bloodline" (03.18) (co-written by Schapker)
- "The Last Sam Weiss" (03.21) (co-written by Schapker)
- "One Night in October" (04.02) (co-written by Schapker)
- "Enemy of My Enemy" (04.09) (co-written by Schapker)
- "A Better Human Being" (04.13) (Owusu-Breen and Schapker co-wrote a teleplay based on a story by executive story editors Robert Chiappetta and Glen Whitman)

=== Revolution ===
In summer 2012, Owusu-Breen joined the crew of the NBC dystopian/adventure series Revolution, as a co-executive producer and writer. Episodes she has contributed to include:

- "No Quarter" (01.03)

=== Agents of S.H.I.E.L.D. ===
Since 2013, Owusu-Breen has been a writer and co-executive producer on Agents of S.H.I.E.L.D..

- "The Well" (01.08)
- "Seeds" (01.12)
- "The Only Light in the Darkness" (01.19)
- "Making Friends and Influencing People" (02.03)
- "One of Us" (02.13)
- "A Wanted (Inhu)man" (03.03)
- "Bouncing Back" (03.11)

=== Midnight, Texas ===
Owusu-Breen adapted Charlaine Harris's book Midnight, Texas into NBC's supernatural drama series of the same name. She exited after the first season

- "Pilot" (01.01)
- "Bad Moon Rising" (01.02)
- "Last Temptation of Midnight" (01.08)
- "The Virgin Sacrifice" (01.10)

=== Ongoing work ===
In 2018, Owusu-Breen was attached as showrunner to 20th Century Fox Television's television reboot of the series Buffy the Vampire Slayer.

In July 2020, it was reported that ABC's adaptation of Greg Rucka's Stumptown graphic novels had added Owusu-Breen as showrunner for its then-upcoming second season, and Owusu-Breen appeared at a virtual Comic-Con panel to help preview the new season. However, the show was then cancelled in September without starting work on the new season, due to COVID-19 complications, which had also required the Comic-Con panel to be virtual.

== Personal life ==
Owusu-Breen is married and has two children.

== Awards ==
The Lost writing staff, including Owusu-Breen, were nominated for the Writers Guild of America (WGA) Award for Best Dramatic Series at the February 2007 ceremony for their work on the second and third seasons.
