= Nora Walker =

Fictional character from the television series Brothers & Sisters

- Brothers & Sisters character
- Sally Field as Nora Walker
- Portrayed by: Sally Field
- First appearance: "Patriarchy"; 1x01, September 24, 2006
- Last appearance: "Walker Down the Aisle"; 5x22, May 8, 2011
- Created by: Jon Robin Baitz
In-universe information
- Occupation: Head of "Open Doors" cancer charity, radio host, homemaker
- Mother: Ida Holden
- Brothers: Saul Holden
- Spouse: William Walker (m. 1967; died 2006)
- Sons: Tommy Walker; Kevin Walker; Justin Walker
- Daughters: Sarah Laurent; Kitty Walker
- Grandsons: Cooper Whedon; William Walker II; Evan McCallister (adoptive); Daniel Walker Wandell
- Granddaughters: Paige Whedon; Elizabeth Walker; Olivia Walker (adoptive)
- Other relatives: Robert McCallister; Scotty Wandell; Luc Laurent

Nora Walker is a fictional character on the ABC television series Brothers & Sisters. She is portrayed by veteran actress Sally Field. Nora is the main character of the series. Field was one of the two characters to appear in all the episodes of the series. She was listed in the Top 10 TV Moms by Film.com. Field won the Primetime Emmy Award for Outstanding Lead Actress in a Drama Series for her portrayal, as well as a Screen Actors Guild Award for Outstanding Performance by a Female Actor in a Drama Series, nominated for two other Emmys, and nominated for three Golden Globes.

== Character history ==
=== Background ===
Nora Walker is the matriarch of the Walker family, born in 1947. She has five children: Sarah, Kitty, Tommy, Kevin, and Justin. She has a brother, Saul. She was married to William Walker for almost forty years. Nora was raised Jewish. She had a difficult relationship with her mother, Ida (Season 1 Episode 13).

=== Season 1 ===
In the first episode Nora's husband, William, died of a heart attack. She later learned about his long affair and illegitimate daughter with his mistress, Holly. Nora slowly learns to accept this secret daughter, and meanwhile deals with the pains and joys of her own five children and William's newly discovered daughter, Rebecca Harper. She also begins a short romance with a handy man named David Morton [Treat Williams]. However, their relationship ends when Nora realizes that it is too soon after William's death to be moving on.

=== Season 2 ===
The second season sees Nora moving on from William's death. She starts dating again. Nora considers moving away from Pasadena but ultimately decides to stay where her family is centered. She begins to date a political friend of Kitty's, Isaac Marshall (played by Danny Glover), who is a widower with five children of his own. Though their relationship deepens, it eventually ends when his work keeps him on the road too much. Nora also contends with a revelation that Rebecca is not William's daughter, but that William did have another child, Ryan Lafferty, with another mistress.

=== Season 3 ===
The third season finds Nora organizing a garage sale in order to collect the money she needs to begin her charity. Justin was concerned about the sale because everything that belonged to William is given away. She also tricks the kids about reconstructing the house for charity. Saul decides to hire Ojai Food's original architect, Roger Grant (played by Nigel Havers), who is an architect to help re-construct the charity clinic. He and Nora have a short fling but she ends it when she learns that Roger is married, despite him telling her that he and his wife share an open marriage. Nora tells him that if she can't have all of him then she doesn't want to be with him. He then decides to divorce his wife to be with Nora, but she tells him that she can't be responsible for such a thing and to not divorce his wife just because it's what she wanted.

=== Season 4 ===
In the fourth season, Nora helps her daughter, Kitty, deal with her cancer. She does all she can to keep her family together through such a hard time and is saddened when she learns that Tommy and Julia are getting a divorce. She and Holly come to blows as they try to plan Justin and Rebecca's wedding. Nora and Saul also receive a visit from their conservative mother, Ida. As Nora struggles to help Kitty through her cancer she meets an oncologist who has been volunteering at the clinic named Simon Craig. The fact that he is younger bothers Nora, but they eventually begin to date after some awkwardness. However, Kevin and Sarah discover Simon has been sued twice and may in fact have had his license revoked. After Nora gives Simon a large sum of money for his clinic, he seemingly loses interest in her; on the day of Justin and Rebecca's wedding, he calls her and tells her that he is unable to attend. He then runs off and goes missing for 6 weeks with her money. Sarah convinces her that he is a con-artist.

Simon does return and gives Nora a story about his being sick and unable to move for six weeks. He manages to convince her to "take" him back. However, Sarah and the other Walker's remain hesitant about their relationship. After some more digging Sarah discovers that while Simon was "sick" he was actually in Boca romancing another widow. Before Sarah can tell Nora this, she refuses to hear any more gossip. When Simon comes over one afternoon to see Nora, she surprises both Simon and Sarah and reveals that she knows everything and as Simon tries to come up with some excuse, the police arrive and Simon is thoroughly trapped. It is later revealed by Saul that Simon went to jail.

=== Season 5 ===
In the start of the fifth season Nora is worried about her children but does not get involved, resulting in Saul telling her that she's lost her voice and immediately sets her children straight. It is revealed that she has been working as a florist (however, Kitty believes and convinces everyone else that she's a lesbian leading Nora to say "What are you talking about? I'm not a lesbian, I'm a florist!") But quits her job and becomes a radio host for a show called 'Call Mom' giving motherly advice to people. Nora also starts a relationship with a radio psychologist named Karl. However, he struggles with how close Nora is with her children and they end their relationship. She also tries to convince Holly to stay with her in Pasadena rather than move to New York with David. Holly is at first glad but decides to move after Nora tries to cook and jog with her and ends up moving. Nora get the shocking news that her mother Ida Holden died, she breaks down and relied on her past love Nick Brody for strength.

It was later revealed that she had an affair with Nick Brody, who is actually Sarah's biological father. At first Sarah wants nothing to do with Brody. Although angry to begin with, on her wedding day Sarah connects with Brody and gives her parents her blessing. Nora ends the series looking over her new extended family—Very happy with her life.
