= Sarah Jane Morris (actress) =

American actress (born 1977)

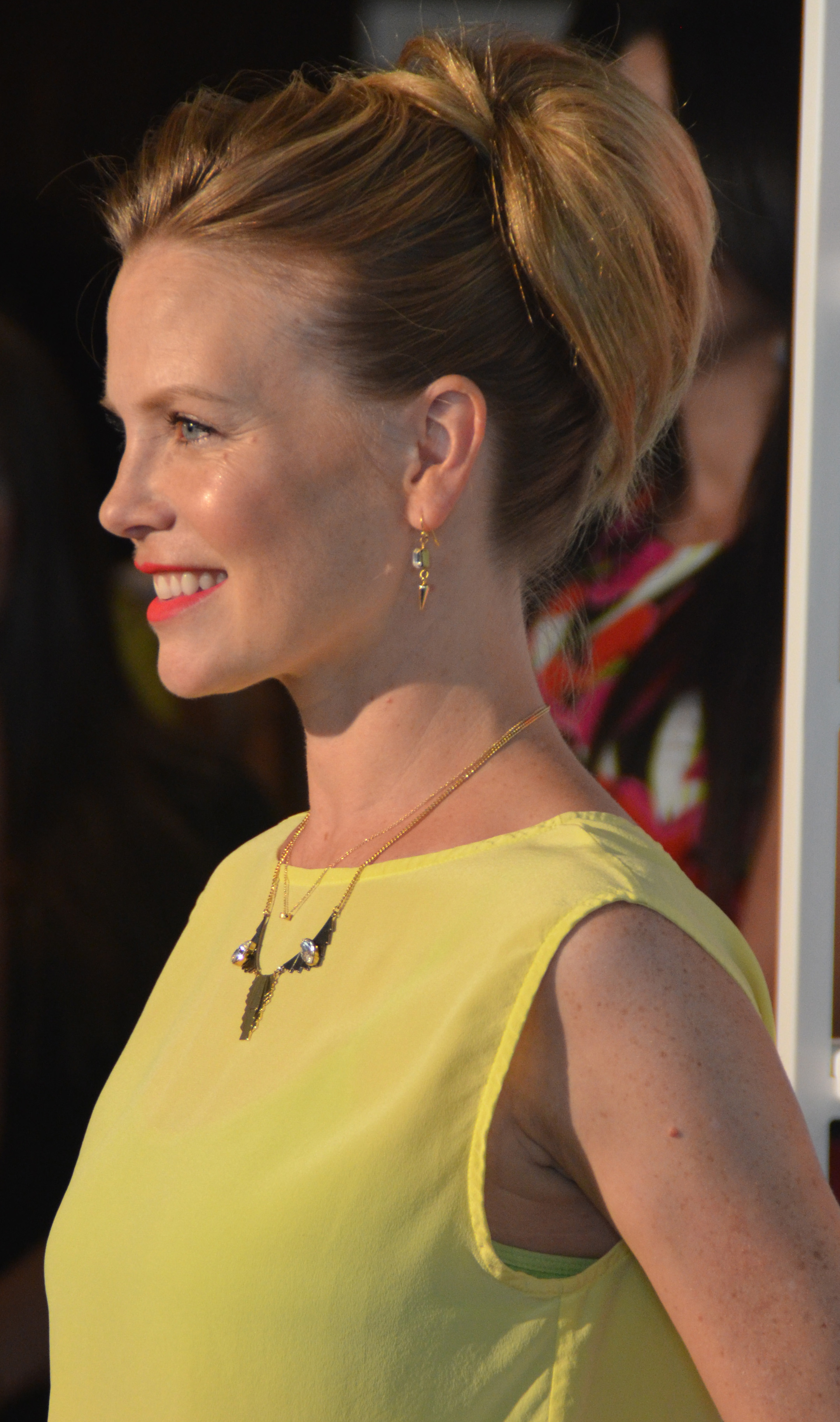
- Morris in 2014
- Born: April 12, 1977 (age 49); Memphis, Tennessee, U.S.
- Other name: Sarah Morris
- Years active: 2000–present
- Spouse: Ned Brower (m. 2005)
- Children: 2

Sarah Jane Morris (born April 12, 1977) is an American actress. She is known for her portrayal of Julia Walker on the ABC television drama Brothers & Sisters from 2006 to 2009; and Special Agent E.J. Barrett on NCIS from 2011 to 2012.

== Life and career ==
Morris was born to Walker (a commercial airline pilot) and Janie Morris, a social worker, the youngest of four siblings, and graduated from the private all-girls' Hutchison School in Memphis. She attended Southern Methodist University (SMU) in Dallas, where she was a member of Kappa Kappa Gamma. It was there that she met her future husband, Ned Brower, whom she married on February 19, 2005. They have a son, Emmett Andrew Brower (born January 24, 2010) and a daughter Beau Katherine (born February 1, 2014).

Morris moved to Los Angeles after college to pursue an acting career and immediately found work on such network television series as Boston Public, Undeclared and Ed. She had a recurring role as Zoe Webb on Felicity from 2001-2002. She later appeared in short-lived drama series Windfall and co-starred in films such as Look and Seven Pounds.

In 2006, Morris was cast as Julia Walker, wife of Tommy Walker (played by Balthazar Getty) in the ABC drama series Brothers & Sisters. She was a regular on the show for the first three seasons and left along with Getty in 2009. In 2011 she was cast as Special Agent Erica Jane Barrett on CBS' NCIS. She also guest-starred in ABC dramas Castle in 2012, and Body of Proof in 2013. In 2013, Morris was cast in A&E drama pilot Occult.

== Filmography ==
=== Film ===
Year	Film	Role	Notes
2000	Coyote Ugly	Girl at the Surprise Party	
2005	Underclassman	Jamie	
2007	Look	Courtney	
2008	Seven Pounds	Susan	
2009	Seeds	Vivian	Short film
2011	6 Month Rule	Beth	
2012	Eden	Sarah Whitaker	Short film
2018	Gosnell: The Trial of America's Biggest Serial Killer	Alexis “Lexy” McGuire	
2022	Cloudy with a chance of Christmas	Tatum Tilson	

=== Television ===
Year	Show	Role	Notes
2001	Undressed	Paula	TV series
2001	Boston Public	Sally Barnes	"Chapter 15", "Chapter 19"
2001	Murder in Small Town X	Abigail "Abby" Flint	TV series
2001	Dark Angel	X6 / Ralph	"Bag 'Em"
2001	Undeclared	Jana	"Rush and Pledge", "Hellweek"
2001–2002	Felicity	Zoe Webb	Recurring role
2002	First Monday	Brittany Kant	"Age of Consent"
2003	Ed	Stacie	"The Decision"
2004	Curb your Enthuasiam	Kim	"Ben's Birthday Party"
2005	Cold Case	Amy Lind (1999)	"Start-Up"
2006	Windfall	Zoe Reida	Recurring role
2006–2009	Brothers & Sisters	Julia Walker	Main role
2008	Law & Order: Criminal Intent	Marla Reynolds	"Please Note We Are No Longer Accepting Letters of Recommendation from Henry Kissinger"
2009	Ghost Whisperer	Caroline Mayhew	"Head Over Heels"
2010	The Odds	Jenny LaSalley	TV film
2011–2012	NCIS	NCIS Special Agent Erica Jane "EJ" Barrett	Recurring role
2012	Castle	Leslie Morgan	"Once Upon a Crime"
2012	Willed to Kill	Karyn Mitchell	TV film
2013	Body of Proof	Pamela Jacks	"Dark City"
2013	Occult	Rebekah Dean	Unsold TV pilot
2013	Criminal Minds	Yvonne Carpenter	"In the Blood"
2015	Hawaii Five-0	Christine Dupont	"Poina 'ole"
2015–2017	The Night Shift	Annie	Recurring role, 9 episodes
2015	Mad Men	Laura Baur	"Lost Horizon"
2015	Murder in the First	Mary McCormack	"The McCormack Mulligan", "State of the Union"
2016	Grey's Anatomy	Captain Vaughn	"All Eyez on Me"
2017	Love Struck Cafe	Megan Quinn	Television film (Hallmark)
2025	The Pitt	Janey Malloy	"8:00 P.M.", "9:00 P.M."
2026	High Potential	Dr. Maeve Sloan	"Grounded (S2E10)"
