= Saul Holden =

Fictional character from the television series Brothers & Sisters

- Brothers & Sisters (2006 TV series) character
- Portrayed by: Ron Rifkin
- First appearance: "Patriarchy"; 1x01, September 24, 2006
- Last appearance: "Walker Down the Aisle"; 5x22, May 8, 2011
- Created by: Jon Robin Baitz
In-universe information
- Occupation: Former CFO of Ojai Foods Co.
- Parents: Ida Holden (mother)
- Siblings: Nora Walker (sister)
- Spouse: Jonathan (fiancé); Henry (ex-boyfriend); Holly Harper (ex-girlfriend)
- Other relatives: William Walker (brother-in-law); Sarah Laurent (niece); Kitty Walker (niece); Tommy Walker (nephew); Kevin Walker (nephew); Justin Walker (nephew); Paige Whedon (great-niece); Cooper Whedon (great-nephew); William Walker II (great-nephew); Elizabeth Walker (great-niece); Evan McCallister (adoptive great-nephew); Olivia Walker Wandell (adoptive great-niece); Daniel Walker Wandell (great-nephew)

Saul Holden is a fictional character on the ABC television series Brothers & Sisters. He is played by actor Ron Rifkin.

== Character history ==
=== Background ===
Saul is Nora Walker's older brother, and works at Ojai Foods, the Walker family business. He has never been married. He was born on August 11, 1938.

== Personal life ==
Saul once dated Holly Harper (portrayed by Patricia Wettig) until he identified himself as homosexual. Saul had a relationship in Season 5 with a man named Jonathan (portrayed by Richard Chamberlain), who Saul said he loved despite the fact he might have been the one who infected him with HIV. Saul and Jonathan began to date in Season 5.

=== Season 1 ===
Saul and Nora are very close. He helped her when her husband died, and defended her from their mother's criticism at her birthday party.

Saul had a brief relationship with Holly Harper, William Walker's former mistress, following William's death. Although this briefly caused friction between Saul and Nora, Saul's feelings toward Holly were in fact ambiguous; it was never fully clear whether his intentions were romantic, platonic or business-related.

In the season finale, it was revealed that Saul once spent a romantic weekend in Key West with another man, an old friend named Milo (Michael Nouri) who reappears at Kitty and Robert's engagement party after an absence of 20 years. He tells Saul that he has finally come out as gay. The exact nature of Saul's sexuality remained ambiguous, though the storyline was developed further in season two.

=== Season 2 ===
Early in the season, Saul acknowledged to his sister Nora that many years ago he was in love with a man.

Saul has often expressed regret for not starting a family of his own and that he is now too old to do so.

Another important clue concerning Saul's sexual orientation turned up in the episode with Kitty and Robert's wedding. At the wedding reception, Holly and Saul have a conversation at the bar about their past intimate relationship. Holly remarks about how Saul keeps lamenting that he always wanted a family of his own, and how she wishes it had happened for him. Saul suggests that maybe their past relationship could have developed further, but Holly says that she could tell that Saul just wasn't that into her, and that while he may have gone through the motions, he obviously was never "feeling it". Holly proceeds to tell him, "I know men," and that she knew he was not interested in her. She tells him that everyone should be able to be with who they love, carefully avoiding the use of either masculine or feminine pronouns.

Saul finally comes out to his openly gay nephew, Kevin Walker, after getting arrested for drunk driving. He tells Kevin that he has missed his entire life and he wants to be happy as a gay man, like Kevin.

=== Season 4 ===
Despite previously having been linked romantically with a man named Henry, Saul identifies as single through the season.

During the season finale, Saul becomes irate at the fact Kevin and Scotty take HIV testing so lightly, and his annoyance is concern to the young couple. Having never been tested and nervous after discovering a former lover is positive, Saul secretly goes to a local hospital alone to learn that people can live with HIV/AIDS asymptomatically. He is tested and, after Nora pushes him the next morning, calls for his results. He assures her "I'm fine." During the final scene, the Walkers are involved in an enormous car accident in which almost every member of the family is injured. When Kevin, bleeding from an open wound on his hand, runs to Saul, bleeding from an open wound on his head and covered with blood, Saul exclaims, "Don't touch me! You can't," indicating that Saul, most likely, is HIV-positive.

=== Season 5 ===
In season 5, Saul falls in love, but the man runs away when he learns that Saul is HIV positive. Saul then finds his previous lover, Jonathan, and confronts him about giving him HIV. He eventually forgives him and they start a relationship. Jonathan asks Saul to marry him in the series finale, and he accepts.
