= Robert McCallister (Brothers & Sisters) =

- Brothers & Sisters character
- Portrayed by: Rob Lowe
- First appearance: "Mistakes Were Made, Part 2"; 1x09, November 19, 2006
- Last appearance: "On The Road Again"; 4x24, May 16, 2010
- Created by: Jon Robin Baitz
In-universe information
- Occupation: U.S. senator for California
- Family: Jason McCallister
- Spouse: Courtney McCallister (divorced); Kitty Walker (m. 2007)
- Children: Sophia McCallister (with Courtney); Jack McCallister (with Courtney); Evan McCallister (with Kitty)

Robert McCallister is a fictional character on the ABC television drama series Brothers & Sisters. He is portrayed by Rob Lowe. Married to Kitty Walker (Calista Flockhart), he was a Republican United States Senator from the state of California, a former candidate for President of the United States, and a former candidate for Governor of California.

== Storylines ==
=== Season 1 ===
Robert McCallister first met Katherine 'Kitty' Walker (Calista Flockhart) when she interviewed him on her talk show. Recently divorced, his marriage to Courtney (Marin Hinkle), with whom he had two young children, was marred by a scandal regarding allegations of his infidelity. Kitty was more interested in asking for his help to get her brother Justin (Dave Annable) out of being sent to Iraq, but Robert could do nothing. When Kitty's talk show folded, Robert asked her to become the communications director for his senatorial office, and later, presidential campaign. They soon began a romantic relationship, over the vehement objections of her gay brother, Kevin (Matthew Rhys), who objected to Robert's record on gay marriage. Thanks to Kitty, Kevin had a brief relationship with Robert's brother Jason (Eric Winter), which ended badly, not doing much to endear Robert or Kevin to each other, but they came to an understanding.

=== Season 2 ===
Robert and Kitty got engaged and had their party at Kitty's family home. Robert's own family, however, stole the spotlight. Robert came under the spotlight when the Republican primary for president kicked into a higher gear. During the Gulf War, Robert was hailed as a hero for something he did not actually do. This secret was revealed during the primary, causing his opponent to question his patriotism. Robert was forced to hire a very skilled consultant named Isaac (Danny Glover), whom he disliked due to Isaac outing Jason while working for one of Robert's primary opponents during a state senate campaign. When Jason found out Isaac had been the one responsible, and was now working for Robert, he was furious, but soon forgave his brother.

Kitty discovered she was pregnant. She had a miscarriage, but wanted to try again. This led to some tension with Robert, who didn't want any more kids, even though he'd told her otherwise. They worked out the conflict and got married.

=== Season 3 ===
Robert soldiered on in his primary campaign, but eventually conceded defeat to the frontrunner, a deep conservative who had engaged in what Robert and Kitty saw as dirty tricks. He asked Robert to be his running mate, much to Kitty's disgust. Robert considered the idea, but ultimately rejected him. In a later episode, Kitty is watching a newscast about the inauguration of Barack Obama, signalling that the show takes place in real-time with the actual winner of the race, despite the fictional candidates in this show.

Robert announces his candidacy for governor of California shortly before suffering a heart attack on the way to see his new adopted baby at the hospital. His recovery is a source of tension to his marriage.

=== Season 4 ===
Robert steps down as senator and his soon to be vacant seat is vied for by his wife Kitty, who during the first half of the season battles (and enters remission for) stage 3 lymphoma. Though his marriage with Kitty faces several bumps, he spends this season developing his skills as a supportive husband. Robert and Kitty renew their vows before her bone marrow transplant. In the season 4 finale, it's revealed that Robert's heart has been acting up again and he's taken to the hospital following chest pains at dinner. The following night, his car strikes a truck as they are returning home. He was last shown with a gaping head wound, unable to communicate with Kitty.

=== Season 5 ===
A year later, Robert is still in a coma with Kitty tending to him, refusing to let him go. The entire family is doubtful of his recovery chances and Justin finally tells Kitty that Robert wouldn't want this, using his last words to help Holly as proof. Kitty realizes he's right and shuts off Robert's life support.
