= Tommy Walker (Brothers & Sisters) =

Fictional character from the television series Brothers & Sisters

- Brothers & Sisters character
- Portrayed by: Balthazar Getty
- First appearance: "Patriarchy"; 1x01, September 24, 2006
- Last appearance: "Walker Down the Aisle"; 5x22, May 8, 2011
- Created by: Jon Robin Baitz
In-universe information
- Occupation: Financial Manager of a Baseball team Former; Associate of Ojai Foods; Co-Founder of Walker Landing
- Parents: Nora Walker (mother); William Walker (father)
- Siblings: Sarah Laurent (sister); Kitty Walker (sister); Kevin Walker (brother); Justin Walker (brother); Rebecca Harper (half sister)
- Spouse: Julia Walker (2004-2009); Rose (fiancée)
- Children: William Walker II (son); Elizabeth Walker (daughter)
- Other relatives: Cooper Whedon (nephew); Evan McCallister (adoptive nephew); Daniel Walker Wandell (nephew); Paige Whedon (niece); Olivia Walker Wandell (adoptive niece); Ida Holden (maternal grandmother); Saul Holden (uncle); Scotty Wandell (brother-in-law); Robert McCallister (brother-in-law); Luc Laurent (brother-in-law)

Thomas "Tommy" Walker is a fictional character on the ABC television series Brothers & Sisters. He is portrayed by Balthazar Getty. In a 2010 episode, actor Cody Longo portrayed a teenage Tommy in flashback sequences set in 1986.

== Character history ==
=== Background ===
Tommy, born in 1969 or 1970, is the third child and firstborn son of Nora Holden Walker and the late William Walker. Like his father, Tommy is a conservative Republican, though this is rarely touched on with the exception of the backstory of when his younger brother Kevin came out of the closet he was the one who was the least accepting of the news. Tommy was married to Julia Walker. Tommy spent years working under his father and his uncle, Saul Holden, at Ojai Foods, hoping he would be able to take over the business someday. After his sister Sarah decided to leave her own high-stakes corporate career behind and work for her father's company to spend more time with her husband and kids, William gave her more and more power in the company, making Tommy feel less important.

=== Business struggles ===
After the death of his father, Tommy assumed he would be named president of the company. When the will was read, Tommy found out Sarah got the job instead. This angered him and both of them struggled to get along and maintain the company from going bankrupt. Eventually they found out where William had hidden the pension fund he'd embezzled from the company; Tommy, Sarah, and Kevin also found out William had a grown daughter with his mistress, Holly Harper, and they chose to keep that a secret.

=== Babies and brothers ===
Tommy and Julia tried to have a baby but found out that Tommy was infertile. They went to a clinic to choose a donor but Tommy disliked the idea of using a stranger's sperm. He asked Kevin to donate sperm so the baby will still be part of the family but Kevin holds back. He later is criticized by Kitty and Sarah for not wanting to help. At a family dinner where everybody finds out about Tommy and Julia's problem, Justin offers his help but Tommy is unsure about it, due to Justin's drug use and lack of drive. After a discussion, both Kevin and Justin decide to donate sperm and never find out who the biological father is. About a month after the donation, Julia finds out she is pregnant with twins. Two years later, when Elizabeth's liver begins to fail, Tommy asks Kevin and Justin to take a paternity test so the biological father can donate a part of his liver. The test reveals that Kevin is the biological father and after the procedure, Elizabeth is saved.

=== His own man ===
While Tommy was happy at home, he felt more and more disillusioned at work. Holly, whose shares in Ojai gave her a significant voice within the company, told him that the reason William didn't want him to be president of the company was that he planned to start another company with Tommy as president, leaving Ojai for Sarah to run. With Holly's help, Tommy decided to start another company. Sarah was furious that her brother would work with their father's mistress, but reluctantly gave her blessing. Meanwhile, Tommy was the first Walker to see William's other daughter, Rebecca (he was at Holly's house when Rebecca dropped in for a visit). Soon, Nora, Justin, and Kitty found out what had been kept from them, and after an initial period of betrayal at being kept in the dark, they got over their disappointment in Tommy, Sarah, and Kevin, and tried to accept Rebecca.

=== Loss of William II ===
Julia went into labor ten weeks early with the twins William Walker II and Elizabeth Walker. Elizabeth was born healthy, but William's kidneys were failing. His only chance for survival was a transplant from Elizabeth, which would have carried high risks for her and had no guarantees of success for him. Tommy and Julia decided not to do the transplant, and William died soon afterwards. Julia plunged into a depression which worsened as the months passed and she found fault in every decision Tommy made as a parent. Finally, her parents arrived for a visit. After a day of dancing around the subject, her father told Tommy that Julia had called them night after night crying. They wanted to take Julia and Elizabeth back home for a while. Tommy was stunned, but even more so when Julia told him it was a good idea, because she blamed him for baby William's death and she needed some time away from him. Tommy reluctantly agreed, telling her she was the love of his life. After Julia and Elizabeth left, Tommy began getting closer to Lena, the new office manager at his company. They engaged in a brief affair but Tommy broke it off, as the thought of him becoming just like his father repulsed him.

=== Revelation and reconciliation ===
When Julia and Elizabeth returned home, Tommy wanted to put the past behind him, but he was shocked when Julia told him she'd slept with another man. Julia was shocked when he told her he'd had an ongoing affair with Lena, and there was some tension as she felt what he did was worse than the one night. Lena soon left town, and Tommy and Julia reconciled.

=== Saving Ojai Foods ===
Tommy and Holly Harper came up with a way to save Ojai Foods by joining Ojai and Walker Landing together, which made Tommy and Sarah co-Presidents of the Ojai/Walker Landing merger, which also makes Holly CEO and their voting rights split between them. Under the merger, Ojai Foods becomes the parent company and Walker Landing becomes one of its subsidiaries.

=== Deals and disgrace ===
After Sarah left Ojai, due to her frustration at the loss of the family nature of the business and feeling blamed for the bad deal that necessitated the Ojai/Walker Landing merger, Tommy also gradually became frustrated with Holly's stranglehold over the company. He sought help from Saul, who offered to assist with getting Holly out, but Saul rejected Tommy's plan to manipulate a deal between Ojai and a shell company to sell land to Ojai in exchange for Ojai shares. Tommy proceeded anyway, despite the warnings from his uncle, and the deal almost went through, until Tommy's deception was discovered at the last moment, and he was arrested.

=== Aftermath ===
Although the charges were ultimately dropped, Tommy had already fled during a weekend getaway with Kevin and Justin. He eventually made contact with Julia, who told him about the charges being dismissed, but he insisted he was not coming back as he needed to figure out who he was resulting in the end of his marriage. After Julia relocated to Seattle, Tommy later decides to follow her to be closer to Elizabeth. Tommy eventually returns to his family with a new fiancée named Rose and later they relocate again outside California.
