= Kitty Walker =

- Brothers & Sisters character
- Portrayed by: Calista Flockhart
- First appearance: "Patriarchy"; 1x01, September 24, 2006
- Last appearance: "Walker Down the Aisle"; 5x22, May 8, 2011
- Created by: Jon Robin Baitz
In-universe information
- Other names: Kitty; Kit
- Occupation: Author, communications director, political commentator
- Parents: William Walker (father); Nora Walker (mother)
- Siblings: Sarah Walker (sister); Tommy Walker (brother); Kevin Walker (brother); Justin Walker (brother) Rebecca Harper (half-sister)
- Spouse: Robert McCallister (m. 2007; died 2010)
- Children: Evan McCallister (adoptive son); Jack McCallister (stepson); Sophia McCallister (stepdaughter)
- Other relatives: Ida Holden (maternal grandmother); Saul Holden (uncle); Cooper Whedon (nephew); William Walker II (nephew); Daniel Walker Wandell (nephew); Paige Whedon (niece); Elizabeth Walker (niece); Olivia Walker Wandell; Jason McCallister (brother-in-law); Scotty Wandell (brother-in-law); Luc Laurent (brother-in-law)

Katherine Anne "Kitty" Walker McCallister is a fictional character on the primetime show Brothers & Sisters. She is played by actress Calista Flockhart. In a two-part 2010 episode, actress Kay Panabaker portrayed a teenage Kitty Walker in flashback sequences set in 1986.

== Character history ==
=== Background ===
Kitty Walker is the second eldest of the Walker family, born in late September 1968, although she is the first child of William and Nora (as Sarah Walker was not William's biological child). Kitty shared the conservative beliefs of her father, William, and brother, Tommy. Being Republican, Kitty always clashed with her mother, Nora, who is more liberal. Even though they love each other, their relationship is somewhat complicated.

One of the reasons for their misunderstanding was because of younger brother Justin. Kitty supported his decision to join the army whereas Nora was completely against it, especially after Justin was deployed to Afghanistan. From that point until Kitty's return to Los Angeles the two had barely spoken to each other. Until she returned for a visit for her birthday, Kitty had not been home in several years. She had been living in New York City, and witnessed the fall of the Twin Towers during the September 11 attacks.

=== Season 1 ===
Kitty quit her job in New York City as a radio host after she was offered the opportunity to be a part of the political show (Red, White and Blue) in Los Angeles, despite the fact that her then fiancé, Jonathan, didn't want her to. Unable to work things out, they broke up.
After the sudden death of her father, Kitty discovered, along with the rest of the Walker family, that her father had been cheating on her mother and had embezzled money from the company pension fund, putting the family business at risk. Feeling betrayed and vulnerable, Kitty slept with cohost Warren Salter, further complicating things with Jonathan, who wanted to reconcile with her. Soon after, they ultimately decided it was for the best if they broke up permanently. Jonathan returned to New York. Kitty was therefore free to pursue an affair with Warren but he was hesitant, as he was already involved with his young assistant, Amber. Warren finally asked Kitty out, and she accepted on the condition that he set things straight with Amber. When Kitty discovered that he didn't do so, she realized they didn't have a future together.

When Kitty's brother Justin was called to fight in Iraq, she asked one of her guests, Senator Robert McCallister, for his help, but he refused. After another failed attempt to make him change his mind, Kitty apologized in front of her audience. Even though she admitted she had made a mistake, she didn't regret it and decided to leave the show. Robert was nonetheless impressed by her frankness. After much persuasion from Robert, Kitty became his communications director. Even though it was obvious that they were attracted to each other, Kitty was reticent at first, wanting to take a "man fast". The two of them nevertheless started dating soon after. Most recently after the campaign helicopter that she and Robert were scheduled to fly on crashed, Kitty asked McCallister to marry her. Later, the Senator proposed and Kitty accepted.

=== Season 2 ===
In Season 2, Kitty continues to plan her wedding to Robert, but when she discovers she is pregnant, the wedding is pushed forward to save the Senator from scandal of having a child out of wedlock. When Kitty eventually miscarries her child, the wedding is put off. After Kitty and Robert marry, their main goal is to have another child; after in vitro fertilization fails, the couple decide to look at adoption. Kitty is also revealed to have written a tell all book about the campaign with Robert and calls in an old friend, Isaac Marshall (played by Danny Glover) to help with the press and Robert's political image. When brother Kevin marries Scotty at the end of the season, it's Kitty who performs the ceremony.

=== Season 3 ===
In Season 3, Kitty and Robert are married and starting the adoption process. She asks Sarah to write a recommendation for her and Robert. However, Sarah asks Nora to do it as she doesn't have time. Kitty, suspicious, questions Sarah about the letter and finds out that Nora wrote it, leading to a slight rift between them. Sarah then writes the letter.

Later, Robert tells Kitty that he has heard rumours that someone in his administration has written a book about his failed presidential campaign. It is revealed that Kitty wrote the book and accidentally leaves it at her mother's home. Nora and Justin read the book and tell the others. They read the book and see that Kitty is talking about them negatively. Kitty and Robert then have them all over for a regular Walker dinner for the social worker. The dinner goes horribly, Nora spills water on the social worker, who leaves. Nora and Kitty then get into an argument. Robert, to everyone's surprise, stands up to Nora and defends Kitty. She explains that she used her family to describe certain aspects about the typical voter. Robert, who is slightly angry about the book, reads it and tells her it's brilliant. However, if Kitty publishes it, she will have to resign as his Communications Director. In the episode "Bakersfield", Kitty is upset because Robert told her he was going to Washington but, in fact, went to Iraq to see the effects of the war. She is initially hurt, fearing he will always put his career ahead of his family. While Robert is away, Kitty gets a call from the adoption agency with the news that a woman who is six months pregnant would like them to have her child. When she calls Robert with the news, his overjoyed reaction persuades her to forgive him.

When Robert returns to the States, they set up a meeting with the birth mother at the hospital she works at. She is a brain surgeon who plainly didn't have time for the baby. After the conversation, everything seemed to be going well and both parties were excited. This was until Kitty decided to go back to the hospital and question Trish (the birth mother) if she was 100% sure that she would go through with the adoption, and Trish was insulted that Kitty would doubt her. She ultimately told Kitty that she would find another set of adoption parents. Kitty was devastated that she had messed their chance up and Robert was upset with Kitty for returning to the hospital without discussing it with him. In a later episode, Trish phoned Robert and Kitty apologizing for "freaking out" when Kitty had questioned her, and thanked her for giving her a chance to rethink her decision, which remained the same. She told them that if they can trust her again, she would be happy to give them her baby. Although Robert was skeptical, Kitty was elated.

After Robert suffers a heart attack, her and Robert's marriage begins to deteriorate as he sinks into a deep depression and secretly launches plans to run for governor of California, and Kitty is left to deal with a recovering Robert and their infant son, Evan. She then meets a man named Alec who is a single father and they slowly bond and become flirtatious. When Robert eventually discovers things it snaps him out of his depression but he becomes upset with Kitty. While in Mexico visiting Tommy, he asks her if she loves him and at first she doesn't know but chases after him, only to find herself too late as his chopper has already taken off.

=== Season 4 ===
In season 4, it is known that Kitty has been diagnosed with Non-Hodgkin's Lymphoma, which will bring the family closer than ever. She starts chemotherapy, then considers stopping it in lieu of herbal remedies and positive thinking. She discovers hair loss from the treatment and shaves her head. She, Robert and Evan all move in with Nora during Kitty's treatment so she can help with Evan during Kitty's weakened state. Though the cancer is seemingly awful news it seems to bring Kitty and Robert closer and repairs their relationship. On the day of Justin and Rebecca's wedding Kitty learns that the chemotherapy has not worked and that in fact her cancer has spread. However, she purposely neglects to tell Robert and her family because she doesn't want to spoil the occasion. During the ceremony as she is reading a poem by e.e. cummings, Kitty passes out and her family rushes to her aid. Justin reveals that she isn't breathing and starts mouth-to-mouth resuscitation. Kitty is resuscitated at the hospital where her doctor reveals that her cancer has indeed advanced and spread and suggests a dangerous bone marrow transplant, which Kitty favors but Nora doesn't.

Robert becomes angry with Kitty for keeping her advanced cancer from him, but they reconcile and he asks her to renew their vows when Kitty chooses the bone marrow transplant over more chemo-therapy. However, all the Walker siblings are tested and it is revealed that none of them are a match. In desperation Nora turns to Ryan and asks him to get tested and it is revealed that he is a match but doesn't want to donate his marrow as he blames the Walkers (in place of William) for his mother's suicide. Nora tries to tell him that she is angry with William as well but that he must move on. Nora also tells Ryan that by not helping Kitty, Evan will lose his mother, like Ryan did. However, it appears he leaves town in order to escape his sabotaging the wine at Ojai. Just as everyone begins to lose hope, Ryan returns after sorting through what Nora said and donates his marrow to his half-sister. The story then jumps three weeks later as Robert holds a press conference, it is revealed that the transplant was a success and Robert concedes his bid for governor and Ryan seemingly makes amends with the Walker family.

Kitty has since begun to run for Robert's senate seat after he decided to step down. Robert is now involved with a group trying to gather evidence on Stanton, a politician. After he catches on to Robert he threatens to derail Kitty's campaign should he go ahead with his information. In the season finale, the Walker family is involved in a massive highway accident. Robert is severely injured, but persuades Justin, who is a med student, to help the others while he waits for an ambulance. Kitty stays with Robert in the car and pleads with him to survive.

=== Season 5 ===
A year later, Kitty is tending to Robert, who has been in a vegetative coma since the accident. She insists he can recover, ignoring the rest of the family's doubts. She's offered a job taking his spot in the RNC, but she refuses as it would take her away from him. She blames Justin for what happened, saying Justin should have tended to Robert at the accident site, but Justin replies Robert wanted him to help Holly. A talk with Nora makes Kitty realize Robert will never wake up and finally decides to shut off his life support. Mourning her husband, she decides she'll be okay as she prepares to move on with her life.

Eventually she rents a house in Ojai to 'find herself' again. She meets a man, Jack, and they become romantically involved. Kitty is initially worried that their relationship won't work because of their different personalities. Jack reveals that he used to work in the city and would move back there if he got to be with Kitty. Once there, however, he begins to become heavily involved in his job and makes plans to move to a different country. Kitty says she can't go because of her family and her son. When they realize that their lives are at different points, they end their relationship.

Soon after this, Kitty is offered a job as a lecturer at Waxley University, which she accepts. Whilst there, a young graduate student named Seth asks her out. Although hesitant because of their age gap, Kitty agrees to go out with him. Their relationship goes well until she finds out his mother is the Dean at Waxley and worries she may lose her job. It turns out that she believes her son is not good enough for Kitty, which only makes Kitty more sure of her feelings. When Kitty leaves for DC, she tells her family she is going for business meetings and breaks things off with Seth. It is later revealed that there were some complications with her bone marrow and her cancer was at risk of returning. Once being given the all clear, she returns home and asks Seth for another chance to which he agrees. They then take a trip to Boston together. Kitty returns to support Sarah when she finds out that Brody is her father. On Sarah's wedding day, she reveals that she is pregnant with Seth's child.
