= Holly Harper =

Fictional character from the television series Brothers & Sisters

- Brothers & Sisters character
- Portrayed by: Patricia Wettig
- Duration: 2006–11
- First appearance: "Patriarchy"; 1x01, September 24, 2006
- Last appearance: "Thanks For The Memories"; 5x12, January 9, 2011
- Created by: Jon Robin Baitz
In-universe information
- Occupation: Chairwoman and CEO of Ojai Foods, Co-Founder of Walker Landing
- Spouse: David Caplan
- Children: Rebecca Harper

Holly Harper is a fictional character on the ABC television series Brothers & Sisters. She is portrayed by Patricia Wettig.

== History ==
=== Background ===
Holly was William Walker's mistress for over 20 years who lived in a house purchased by William Walker 15 minutes away from the Walker Household.

=== Season 1 ===
Holly was first introduced as a friend of William Walker. After he died, it was discovered that they had had an affair for several years that produced Holly's daughter Rebecca. She eventually buys a large share in the Ojai Food Co., thanks to the large amount of money William leaves her and Rebecca. Yet then she proposes that the company buys a winery and it is voted down, to the joy of Sarah. However, when Tommy hears of the idea, he and Holly go into business together by buying and opening the Walker Landing winery.

=== David Caplan ===
When Rebecca and Holly have a fight, Holly finds out that David Caplan is Rebecca's father. Holly and her daughter have a fight and Holly tells her daughter that she has had enough of Rebecca treating her like a second class citizen. Holly then kicked her out of the house. Holly and Tommy helped save Ojai Foods from going under when they merged the businesses together making Holly CEO of the companies.

=== Season 5 ===
A year has passed since the season 4 finale and Holly has a memory problem because of a car accident in the season 4 finale. She's unable to remember her daughter Rebecca, and believes that she is still with William. Justin attempts to help Holly remember Rebecca and her memories but when he does she takes 10 steps back into forgetting. Eventually she gets somewhat better and moves to New York with David.
