= Dave Annable =

American actor

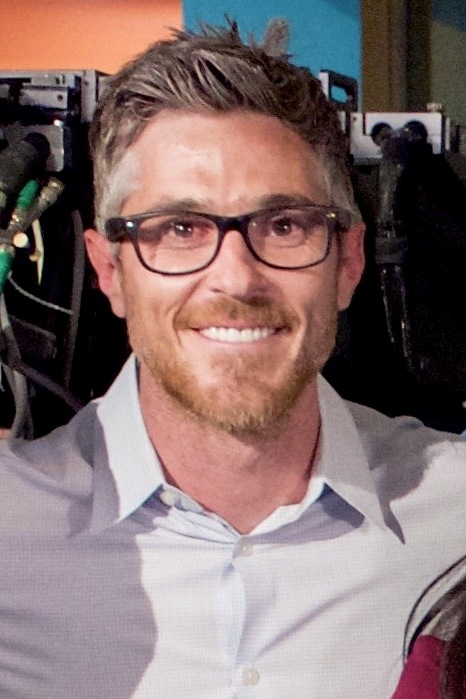
- Annable on the set of Heartbeat in 2016
- Born: David Rodman Annable; September 15, 1979 (age 46); Suffern, New York, U.S.
- Education: State University of New York at Plattsburgh (BA)
- Occupation: Actor
- Years active: 2002–present
- Spouse: Odette Yustman (m. 2010)
- Children: 2

David Rodman Annable (born September 15, 1979) is an American actor. His roles include Justin Walker on the ABC television drama Brothers & Sisters (2006–11), Henry Martin on the ABC supernatural drama 666 Park Avenue (2012–13), Pierce Harrison on the NBC medical drama Heartbeat (2016), and Dr. Neal McNamara on the Paramount+ spy series Lioness (2023-present).

== Early life and education ==
Annable was born in Suffern, New York. He grew up in Walden, a village further upstate, where he played baseball, rugby and hockey. His father is Christian and his mother is of Jewish descent, and he was "raised both".

Annable graduated Valley Central High School in 1997. He attended the State University of New York at Plattsburgh (SUNY Plattsburgh). There, he became involved with the student-run TV station, Plattsburgh State Television (PSTV), working both on production behind the scenes and on the air as well. He hosted many shows at PSTV, including Late Night with Dave Annable, Cardinal Sports, and The Roommate Game. Annable credits PSTV for preparing him for his successful career in television. Annable dropped out of college in 2003 to pursue his acting career.

After leaving SUNY Plattsburgh, Annable studied acting at the Neighborhood Playhouse in New York with Richard Pinter.

== Career ==
In 2002, Annable made his acting debut in an episode of the NBC crime drama Third Watch. Annable has appeared in numerous commercials for brands such as Mountain Dew, Starburst and Abercrombie and Fitch. In 2004, Annable appeared in the films Little Black Book and Spellbound. In September 2005, Annable began appearing as Aaron Lewis on the Fox drama series Reunion, which centers on six friends who attend their 20th high school reunion, where one of them is murdered and all of them are suspects. In December, Fox cancelled the series due to low ratings shortly after the ninth episode aired. The WB reportedly showed interest in picking up the series on their network, but these plans never materialized.

In 2006, Annable was cast as Justin Walker on the ABC drama series Brothers & Sisters alongside Calista Flockhart, Rachel Griffiths, and Sally Field, which was picked up for a full season by the network. In 2007, Annable was ranked as #7 on People magazine's annual list of Sexiest Men Alive. In 2008, Annable won a Prism Award for Best Performance in a Drama Series Multi-Episode Storyline for his portrayal on Brothers & Sisters. The series ran for five seasons until 2011.

In January 2012, Annable was confirmed to star as the male protagonist on the ABC supernatural drama series 666 Park Avenue alongside Rachael Taylor, Vanessa Williams and Robert Buckley, which was picked up for a first season of 13 episodes in May. The series debuted in September only to be cancelled by November and removed from the network's schedule in December. 666 Park Avenue returned to ABC in June 2013 to burn off its remaining episodes.

In 2014, Annable starred on the Fox series Red Band Society, where he played the role of pediatric oncologist and surgeon Dr. Adam McAndrew. In 2016, he appeared as Pierce Harris on the NBC medical drama Heartbeat alongside Melissa George and Don Hany. Both series were also cancelled after one season.

In 2016, he landed recurring role as Teddy Grant on Fox's comedy series The Mick alongside Kaitlin Olson. On April 5, 2016, it was announced that Annable joined the WWE Studio action film Armed Response alongside Wesley Snipes and Anne Heche. The movie was released in theaters on August 4, 2017. He also starred as author Joe McGinniss in Jeffrey MacDonald true crime murder movie Final Vision on Investigation Discovery.

On August 3, 2017, Annable was cast as Lee Dutton, a cowboy who serves as his father's (Kevin Costner) right-hand man in running the ranch, in the pilot episode of Paramount Network's period drama Yellowstone. He starred as Billy opposite his real life wife Odette Annable in a Freeform holiday movie No Sleep 'Til Christmas. In 2019, Annable played the role of Dr. Ian Harris in Netflix's social thriller What/If . In 2020, he guest starred as Kirby in an episode of NBC drama series This Is Us.

== Personal life ==
Annable had a relationship with his Brothers & Sisters co-star Emily VanCamp beginning in 2007. He married Odette Yustman on October 10, 2010, who was also a love interest of Annable's character on the final season of Brothers & Sisters. They have two daughters. In October 2019, the couple announced their separation, but announced their reconciliation in August 2020.

Five years after dropping out of college, Annable earned his diploma from SUNY Plattsburgh on May 16, 2009. In addition to earning his diploma, Annable was awarded the "Off To A Good Start" award and gave a commencement address to his fellow Class of 2009 graduates. Completing college was a promise he made to his mother.

== Filmography ==
Film
Year	Title	Role
2004	Little Black Book	Bean
2011	You May Not Kiss the Bride	Bryan Lighthouse
2011	What's Your Number?	Jake Adams
2017	Armed Response	Gabriel

Television
Year	Title	Role	Notes
2002	Third Watch	Doug Maple, Jr.	Episode: "Firestarter"
2005–06	Reunion	Aaron Lewis	Main cast; 13 episodes
2006–11	Brothers & Sisters	Justin Walker	Main cast; 106 episodes
2012–13	666 Park Avenue	Henry Martin	Main cast; 13 episodes
2013	Ben and Kate	Professor Greg	Episode: "Ethics 101"
2014–15	Red Band Society	Dr. Adam McAndrew	Main cast; 13 episodes
2016	Heartbeat	Pierson "Pierce" Harris	Main cast; 10 episodes
2017	The Mick	Teddy Grant	Episode: "The Master"
2017	Final Vision	Joe McGinniss	TV film (Investigation Discovery)
2018, 2021	Yellowstone	Lee Dutton	4 Episodes
2018	No Sleep 'Til Christmas	Billy	TV film (Freeform)
2019	What/If	Dr. Ian Harris	Main cast; 10 episodes
2020	This Is Us	Kirby	Episode : "New York, New York, New York"
2021	Fantasy Island	Zev Randall	Episode: "His and Hers/The Heartbreak Hotel"
2021–2022	Walker	Dan Miller	Recurring (seasons 2–3); 12 episodes
2023–present	Lioness	Dr. Neal McNamara	Main cast
2025	The Waterfront	Wes Larsen	Recurring role; 5 episodes

Web
Year	Title	Role	Notes
2012	Fetching	Blake	4 episodes
