= I'll Be Waiting =

I'll Be Waiting may refer to:

A song:

- "I'll Be Waiting" (The Offspring song), a 1989 single by The Offspring
- "I'll Be Waiting" (Lenny Kravitz song), a single by Lenny Kravitz
- "I'll Be Waiting" (Cian Ducrot song), a 2022 single by Cian Ducrot
- "I'll Be Waiting", by Santana from the 1977 album Moonflower
- "I'll Be Waiting", by Talisman from the 1990 album Talisman
- "I'll Be Waiting", by Thunder from their 1995 album Behind Closed Doors
- "I'll Be Waiting", by John Sykes from the 1997 album Loveland
- "I'll Be Waiting", a 2001 single by Full Intention
- "I'll Be Waiting", by Michael Franti & Spearhead from the 2010 album The Sound of Sunshine
- "I'll Be Waiting", by Adele from the 2011 album 21
- "I'll Be Waiting", by Bankstatement
- "I'll Be Waiting", by Walk Off the Earth

I'll Be Waiting may also be:

- A 1939 short story by Raymond Chandler
- An episode of the television series Fallen Angels
- A screenplay from the 1993 anthology Fallen Angels: Six Noir Tales Told for Television
