= The Government Inspector =

1836 satirical play by Nikolai Gogol

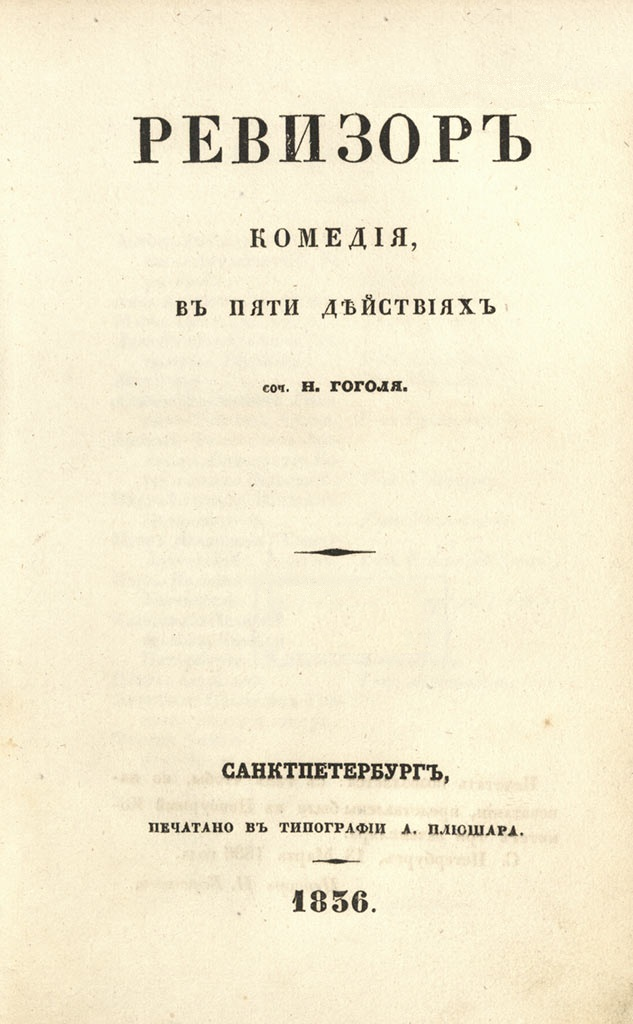
- Title page of the first edition, with archaic spelling Ревизоръ
- Original language: Russian
- Written by: Nikolai Gogol
- Genre: Comedy

Premiere
- Date: 1 May 1836
- Place: Alexandrinsky Theatre, St. Petersburg, Russia

The Government Inspector, also known as The Inspector General (Russian: Ревизор, romanized: Revizor, literally: "Inspector" or "Auditor"), is a satirical play by Russian dramatist and novelist Nikolai Gogol. Originally published in 1836, the play was revised for an 1842 edition. Based upon an anecdote allegedly recounted to Gogol by Pushkin, the play is a mistaken identity comedy of errors, satirizing human greed, stupidity, and the political corruption of contemporary Russia.

The dream-like scenes of the play, often mirroring each other, whirl in the endless vertigo of self-deception around the main character, Khlestakov (rendered in some English translations as Hlestakov), who personifies irresponsibility, light-mindedness, and absence of measure. "He is full of meaningless movement and meaningless fermentation incarnate, on a foundation of placidly ambitious inferiority" (D. S. Mirsky). The publication of the play led to a great outcry in the reactionary press. It took the personal intervention of Tsar Nicholas I to have the play staged, with Mikhail Shchepkin taking the role of the Mayor. Nicholas I was personally present at the play's premiere at the Alexandrinsky Theatre in St. Petersburg on April 19, 1836, concluding that "there is nothing sinister in the comedy, as it is only a cheerful mockery of bad provincial officials."

== Background ==
Early in his career, Gogol was best known for his short stories, which gained him the admiration of the Russian literary circle, including Alexander Pushkin. After establishing a reputation, Gogol began working on several plays. His first attempt to write a satirical play about imperial bureaucracy in 1832 was abandoned out of fear of censorship. In 1835, he sought inspiration for a new satirical play from Pushkin.

Do me a favour; send me some subject, comical or not, but an authentically Russian anecdote. My hand is itching to write a comedy... Give me a subject and I'll knock off a comedy in five acts – I promise, funnier than hell. For God's sake, do it. My mind and stomach are both famished.

— Letter from Gogol to Pushkin, October 7, 1835

Pushkin had a storied background and was once mistaken for a government inspector in 1833. His notes alluded to an anecdote distinctly similar to what would become the basic story elements for The Government Inspector.

Krispin arrives in the Province ... to a fair – he is taken for [illegible] ... . The governor is an honest fool – the governor's wife flirts with him – Krispin woos the daughter.

— Pushkin, Full collected works, volume 8, book 1

== Plot summary ==
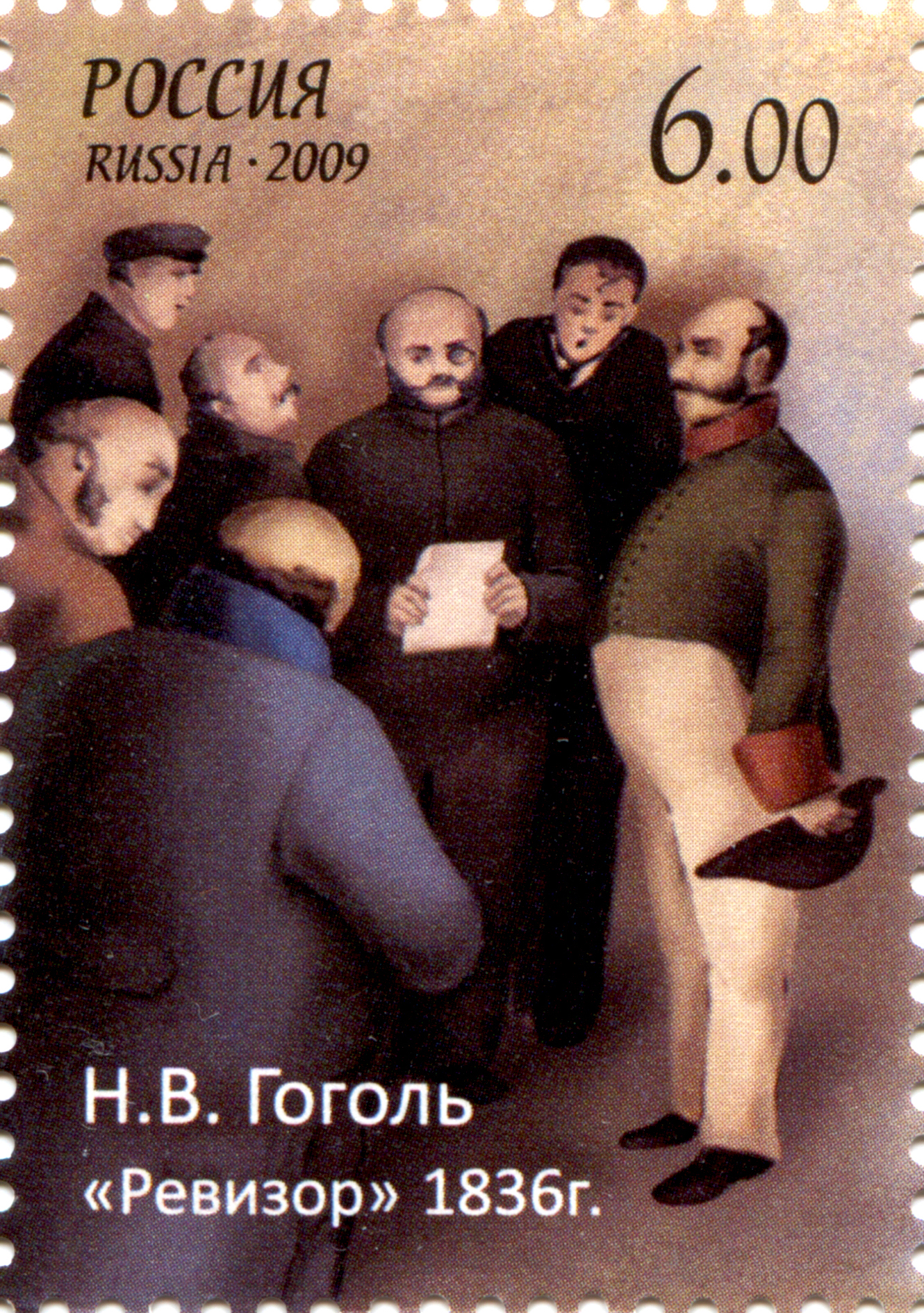
A stamp depicting "The Government Inspector",2009

The corrupt officials of a small Russian town, headed by the Mayor, react with panic to the news that an incognito inspector will soon be arriving in their town to investigate them. The flurry of activity to cover up their considerable misdeeds is interrupted by the report that a suspicious person had arrived two weeks previously from Saint Petersburg and is staying at the inn. That person, however, is not an inspector; it is Ivan Alexandreyevich Khlestakov (Hlestakov in some translations) a foppish civil servant with a wild imagination.

They learn that Khlestakov has not been paying for the hotel, just charging to the bill. Moreover, his original travel destination was Saratov Governorate, but for some unknown reason he has been staying in this town for a long time. Therefore, the Mayor and his crooked cronies are immediately certain that this upper-class twit is the dreaded inspector. For quite some time, however, Khlestakov does not even realize that he has been mistaken for someone else. Meanwhile, he enjoys the officials' terrified deference and moves in as a guest in the Mayor's house. He also demands and receives massive "loans" from the Mayor and all of his associates. He also flirts outrageously with the Mayor's wife and daughter.

Sick and tired of the Mayor's ludicrous demands for bribes, the town's Jewish and Old Believer merchants arrive, begging Khlestakov to have him dismissed from his post. Stunned at the Mayor's rapacious corruption, Khlestakov states that he deserves to be exiled in chains to Siberia. Nevertheless, he still requests more "loans" from the merchants, promising to comply with their request.

Terrified that he is now undone, the Mayor pleads with Khlestakov not to have him arrested, only to learn that the latter has become engaged to his daughter. Khlestakov then announces that he is returning to Saint Petersburg, having been persuaded by his valet Osip that it is too dangerous to continue the charade any longer.

After Khlestakov and Osip depart on a coach driven by the village's fastest horses, the Mayor's friends all arrive to congratulate him. Certain that he now has the upper hand, he summons the merchants, boasting of his daughter's engagement and vowing to squeeze them for every kopeck they are worth. However, the Postmaster suddenly arrives carrying an intercepted letter which reveals Khlestakov's true identity – and his mocking opinion of them all.

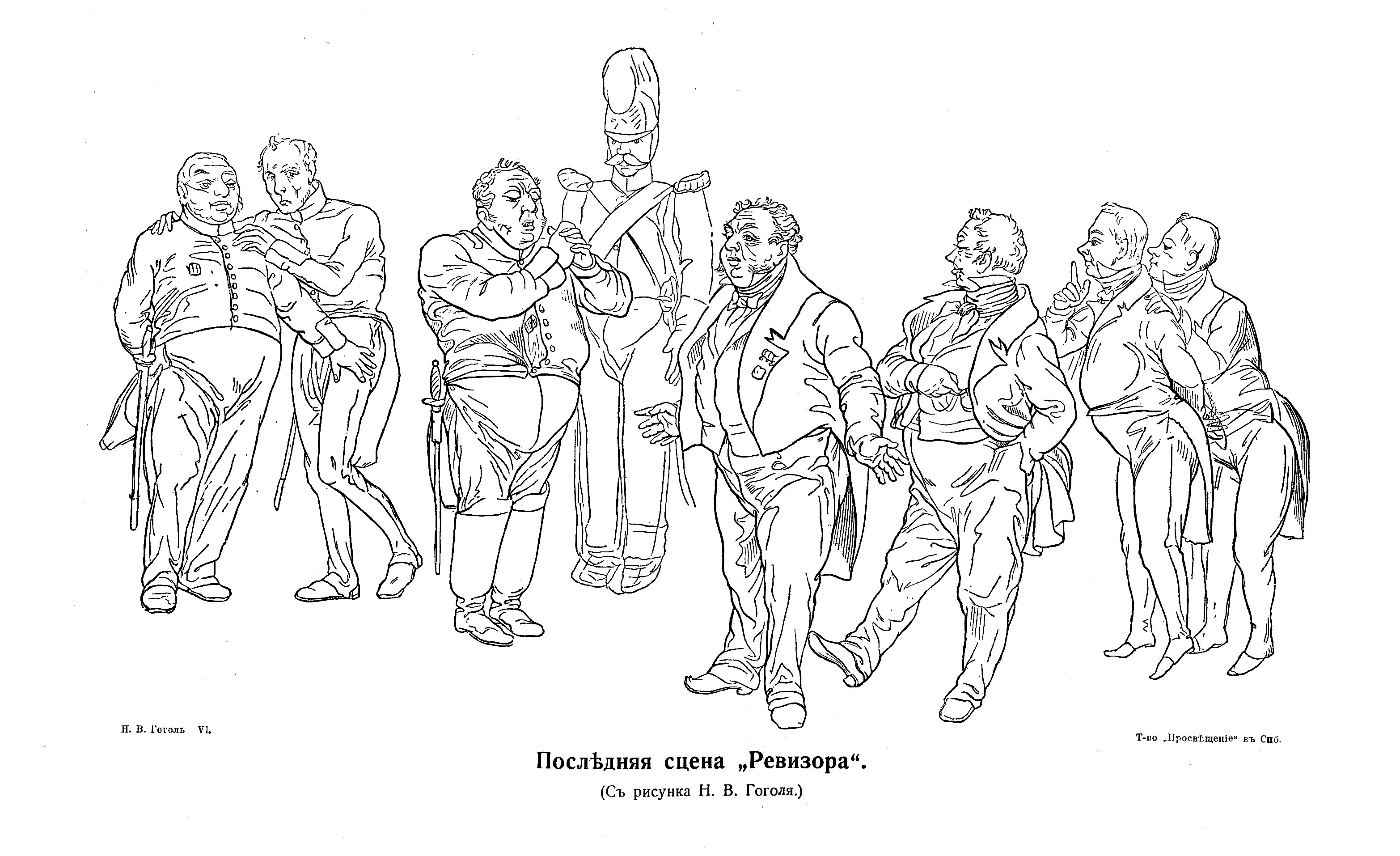
The "silent scene" from Gogol's own drawing

The Mayor, after years of bamboozling governors and shaking down criminals of every description, is enraged to have been this humiliated. He screams at his cronies, stating that they, not himself, are to blame. At this moment, the famous fourth-wall breaking phrase is uttered by the Mayor to the audience: "What are you laughing about? You are laughing about yourselves!".

While the cronies continue arguing, a message arrives from the real Government Inspector, who is demanding to see the Mayor immediately. The play ends with the long "silent scene" ("немая сцена"), with everybody frozen still for over a minute. This culminating scene had become proverbial and was commented upon by many critics.

== Commentary ==
D. S. Mirsky wrote that The Government Inspector "is not only supreme in character and dialogue – it is one of the few Russian plays constructed with unerring art from beginning to end. The great originality of its plan consisted in the absence of all love interest and of sympathetic characters. The latter feature was deeply resented by Gogol's enemies, and as a satire the play gained immensely from it. There is not a wrong word or intonation from beginning to end, and the comic tension is of a quality that even Gogol did not always have at his beck and call." In 2014, The Daily Telegraph made a list of the 15 best plays, and included The Government Inspector.

A number of Gogol's essays and commentaries related to the play were published in a collection titled Приложения к "Ревизору", Prilozheniya k "Revizoru", 'Supplements to "The Inspector General"'.

=== Meyerhold's production ===
In 1926, the expressionistic production of the comedy by Vsevolod Meyerhold "returned to this play its true surrealistic, dreamlike essence after a century of simplistically reducing it to mere photographic realism". Erast Garin interpreted Khlestakov as "an infernal, mysterious personage capable of constantly changing his appearance". Leonid Grossman recalls that Garin's Khlestakov was "a character from Hoffmann's tale, slender, clad in black with a stiff mannered gait, strange spectacles, a sinister old-fashioned tall hat, a rug and a cane, apparently tormented by some private vision".

Meyerhold wrote about the play: "What is most amazing about The Government Inspector is that although it contains all the elements of... plays written before it, although it was constructed according to various established dramatic premises, there can be no doubt – at least for me – that far from being the culmination of a tradition, it is the start of a new one. Although Gogol employs a number of familiar devices in the play, we suddenly realize that his treatment of them is new... The question arises of the nature of Gogol's comedy, which I would venture to describe as not so much 'comedy of the absurd' but rather as 'comedy of the absurd situation.'"

In the finale of Meyerhold's production at the Vsevolod Meyerhold State Theatre, the actors were replaced with dolls, a device that Andrei Bely compared to the stroke "of the double Cretan axe that chops off heads," but a stroke entirely justified in this case since "the archaic, coarse grotesque is more subtle than subtle."

== Adaptations and reinterpretations ==
=== Film ===
Films adapted from The Government Inspector include:

- Eine Stadt steht kopf, or A City Upside Down (1932), a German film directed by Gustaf Gründgens
- Revizor (1933), a Czech film directed by Martin Frič, starring Vlasta Burian
- Antek policmajster (1935), a Polish film directed by Michał Waszyński, starring Adolf Dymsza
- The Inspector General (1949), a Hollywood musical comedy starring Danny Kaye. The film bears only passing resemblance to the original play. Kaye's version sets the story in Napoleon's empire, instead of Russia, and the main character presented to be the ersatz inspector general is not a haughty young government bureaucrat, but a down-and-out illiterate, run out of a gypsy's travelling medicine show for not being greedy and deceptive enough.
- Afsar (1950), a Bollywood musical comedy directed by Chetan Anand
- The Inspector-General (Russian title: Revizor]] (1952), USSR, directed by Vladimir Petrov.
- Ammaldar ("the Government Inspector") (1953), an Indian Marathi film directed by P. L. Deshpande.
- Tamu Agung ("The Exalted Guest") (1955), an Indonesian film directed by Usmar Ismail, is a loose adaptation of Gogol's play. The story is set in a small village in the island of Java, shortly after the nation's independence. While not strictly a musical like its Hollywood counterpart, there are several musical numbers in the film.
- Anni ruggenti (Roaring Years) (1962), an Italian film directed by Luigi Zampa, starring Nino Manfredi. In the film, the story is transposed to a small town in South Italy, during the years of Fascism.
- Calzonzin Inspector (1974), a Mexican film directed and co-written by Alfonso Arau, using the political cartoonist/writer Rius's characters.
- Reviisori (1975), a Finnish straight adaptation.
- Tosun Paşa (1976), a Turkish film directed by Kartal Tibet starring Kemal Sunal. In the film, the story is transposed to Ottoman Empire.
- Incognito from St. Petersburg (1977), a Soviet film by Leonid Gaidai
- A Keychain with a Secret (1981), a Soviet musical comedy, a reinterpretation of the plot set in Leonid Brezhnev's era, in which three crooks take an unwitting hairdresser for a revisor and are trying to find out what size of the bribe he wants.
- De Boezemvriend ("The Bosom Friend") (1982), a Dutch film starring André van Duin. A musical comedy which is not so much an adaptation of Gogol's work, but a remake of The Inspector General. An itinerant dentist in the French-occupied Netherlands is taken for a French tax inspector.
- Revizor (1996), a Russian version directed by Sergey Gazarov, with Nikita Mikhalkov playing the Mayor.

=== Television ===
In 1958 the British comedian Tony Hancock appeared as Khlestakov in a live BBC Television version (which survives).

The PBS series Wishbone adapted the story for an episode.

In 2002 the Iranian playwright and director Mohammad Rahmanian adapted a version for national TV.

=== Theatre ===
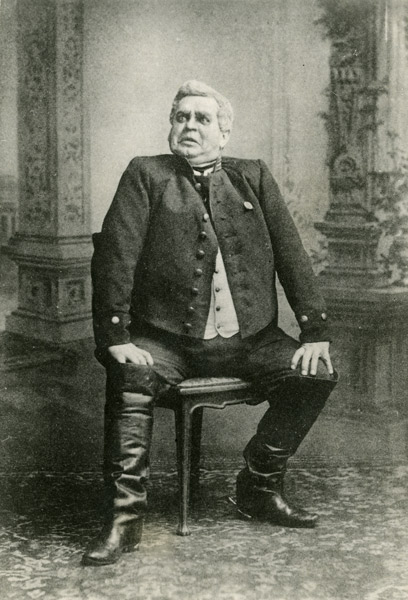
Anton Antonovich, played by Fyodor Paramonov, has many reasons to be worried about a visit from the inspector general (Maly Theatre (Moscow), 1905.

Fyodor Dostoevsky played the postmaster Shpekin in a charity performance with proceeds going to the Society for Aid to Needy Writers and Scholars in April 1860.

In Fritz Hochwälder's The Raspberry Picker ("Der Himbeerpflücker", 1965) the leaders of an Austrian town mistake a small town crook for a Nazi war criminal and treat him as a returning hero. An Austrian TV production starring Helmut Qualtinger and Kurt Sowinetz aired the same year.

Inspecting Carol (1991) by American playwright Daniel J. Sullivan is a loose adaptation in which a man auditioning for a role in A Christmas Carol at a small theatre is mistaken for an informer for the National Endowment for the Arts.

In 2005, the Chichester Festival Theatre produced a new version of the play translated by Alistair Beaton.

The UN Inspector (2005) by David Farr is a "freely adapted" version written for London's National Theatre, which transposed the action to a modern-day ex-Soviet republic. Farr's adaptation has been translated into French by Nathalie Rivere de Carles and was performed in France in 2008.

In 2006, Greene Shoots Theatre performed an ensemble-style adaptation at the Edinburgh Festival Fringe. Directed by Steph Gunary (née Kirton), the acting used physical theatre, mime, and chorus work that underpinned the physical comedy. The application of Commedia dell'arte-style characterisation both heightened the grotesque and sharpened the satire.

The play was revived by the Birmingham Repertory Theatre for a UK Tour in 2016 directed by Roxana Silbert. It toured New Wolsey Theatre, West Yorkshire Playhouse, Theatre Royal Stratford East, Nottingham Playhouse, Liverpool Everyman and Sheffield Crucible. This production was nominated for the Laurence Olivier Award in Outstanding Achievement in Affiliate Theatre in the 2017 ceremony.

In 2024, a new adaptation by Patrick Myles was staged at the Marylebone Theatre, starring Kiell Smith-Bynoe, Dan Skinner and Martha Howe-Douglas.

In 2025, it returned to Chichester Festival Theatre in a new adaptation by Phil Porter and starring Tom Rosenthal as Khlestakov.

=== Operas ===
- Der Revisor (1907), by Karel Weis(s); probably an operetta.
- The Inspector General (1928) by Eugene (Jeno) Zádor; revised version first performed on 11 June 1971 by the Westcoast Opera Company at El Camino College in Los Angeles.
- Il Revisore (1940), by Amilcare Zanella; premiered in Trieste
- Der Revisor (1957), by Werner Egk (1901–1983); first performed at the Schlosstheater Schwetzingen at the Schwetzingen Festival
- Dolazi revisor (1965), by Krešimir Fribec
- Chlestakows Wiederkehr (2008), by Giselher Klebe; first performed at the Landestheater Detmold
- The Inspector (2011), music by John Musto, libretto by Mark Campbell, set in Fascist Italy, premiered at the Wolf Trap Opera Company.

=== Dance ===
In 2019, Canadian choreographer Crystal Pite and her Kidd Pivot dance company adapted The Government Inspector into a full-length dance-theatre work titled Revisor. The piece premiered during Pite's residency at Sadler's Wells Theatre, and was broadcast by the BBC.
