= Mimi Lieber =

American actress and choreographer (born 1956)

- Born: March 1, 1956 (age 70); Venice, California, U.S.
- Occupations: Actress; choreographer
- Years active: 1978–present
- Spouse: Daniel J. Sullivan

Mimi Lieber (born March 1, 1956) is an American retired actress and choreographer. Her last screen role was in a 2018 television special of the Broadway production Indecent.

== Biography ==
Lieber was born in Venice, California on March 1, 1956. She is an actress who has had principal roles in theater including Broadway as well as in film and television. Her Broadway credits include I'm Not Rappaport (2002), Brooklyn Boy (2005), Act One (2014), and Indecent (2017). In 1991, she performed in The Heidi Chronicles at The Kennedy Center, which was directed by Daniel J. Sullivan, who she later married. She choreographed The Public Theater's production of Twelfth Night (2009) and the final wedding dance for As You Like It (2012), which were both directed by Sullivan and performed at the Delacorte Theater in Central Park.

She played Joey Tribbiani's sister Mary Therese in the episode "The One Where Chandler Can't Remember Which Sister" on Friends and psychic Rula in the episode "The Suicide" on Seinfeld.

== Filmography ==
=== Film ===
Year	Title	Role
1978	Grease	Dancer
1978	Sgt. Pepper's Lonely Hearts Club Band	Dancer
1979	Killer's Delight	Hooker
1982	Night Shift	Linda
1986	Last Resort	Mimi
1987	White of the Eye	Liza Manchester
1989	L. A. Takedown	Elaine Cerrito
1990	To the Moon, Alice	Yuppie Woman
1990	Appearances	Teresa
1993	Wilder Napalm	Snake Lady
1993	Ghost in the Machine	Marta
1994	Corrina, Corrina	Rita Lang
1997	Breast Men	N.O.W Representative
1998	Bulworth	Mrs. Liebowitz
1999	Locust Valley	Lady 0livia
2001	Frank's Last Dance	Molly
2001	March	Mary Fromm
2003	Just Another Story	Gracie
2005	The Thing About My Folks	Bonnie
2007	Arranged	Sheila Meshenberg
2009	Cold Souls	Friend at Restaurant
2009	Everbody's Fine	Jean Goode

=== Television ===
Year	Title	Role	Notes
1979	Barnaby Jones	Gita	Episode: "False Witness" (S 8:EP 9)
1987	Growing Pains	Susan	Episode: "Born Free" (S 2:EP20)
1988	Night Court	Maria	Episode: "Chrizzi's Honour" (S 5:Ep 15)
1989	Studio 5-B	Unknown	Episode: "Life's Too Short" (S 1:EP 3)
1989	Doogie Howser, M.D.	Denise	Episode: "The Short Goodbye" (S 1:Ep 5)
1989	Wiseguy	Marie, Connie Merullo	3 Episodes
1990	L.A. Law	Wendy Weiss	Episode: "On Your Honour" (S 4:Ep 12)
1992	Seinfeld	Rula	Episode: "The Suicide" (S 3:Ep 15)
1992	Civil Wars	Janet Frommer	Episode: "Whippet' Til It Breaks" (S 1:Ep 12)
1993	The Commish	Madame Celeste	Episode: "The Heart Is a Lonely Sucker" (S 2:Ep 13)
1993	Beverly Hills, 90210	Melanie Silverman	Episode: "Something in The Air" (S 3:Ep 128)
1994	X-Files	Anita Fiore	Episode: "Born Again" (S 1:Ep 22)
1990	The George Carlin Show	Miranda	Episode: "George Gets A Big Surprise" (S 1:Ep 8)
1994	SeaQuest 2032	Aunt Rose	2 episodes
1995	Melrose Place	Dr Steeles Secretary	Episode: "Breakfast at Tiffany's, Dinner at Eight" (S 3:Ep 21)
1996	Diagnosis: Murder	Rosie	Episode: "FMurder" (S 3:Ep 17)
1995–1996	Dave's World	Celia	2 episodes
1996	High Incident	Anita SImon	Episode: "Whispers of the Dead" (S 2:Ep 1)
1997	Friends	Mary Therese	Episode: "The One Where Chandler Can't Remember Which Sister" (S 3:Ep 11)
1997	Leaving L.A.	Unknown	Episode: "The Black Widower" (S 1:Ep 4)
1998	Clueless	Pregnant Woman	Episode: "Labor Of Love" (S 2:Ep 13)
1998	Smart Guy	Dr Bonham	Episode: "Goodbye, Mr Chimps" (S 2:Ep 17)
1998	Pensacola: Wings of Gold	Dana Cooper	Episode: "Great Expectations" (S 1:Ep 20)
1998	NYPD Blue	Mrs Wiggins	Episode: "Seminal Thinking" (S 5:Ep 21)
1998	Party of Five	Zora	Episode: "Naming Names" (S 5:Ep 3)
1998–1999	Early Edition	Molly Greene	3 episodes
1999	Any Day Now	Unknown	Episode: "Elephants in The Room" (S 2:Ep 11)
2000	Brutally Normal	Russell's Mom	2 episodes
2000	The Practice	D. A. Marcia Scott	Episode: "Black Widows" (S 4:Ep 17)
2000	Touched by an Angel	Greta	Episode: "Monica's Bad Day" (S 6:Ep 23)
2001	ER	Dr Malcolm	Episode: "Piece Of Mind" (S 7:Ep 10)
2001	The Drew Carey Show	Ms Hager	Episode: "All Work And No Pay" (S 6:Ep 14)
2002	Maybe It's Me	Karen	Episode: "The Lab Partner Episode" (S 1:Ep 18)
2004	The Mountain	Anita Serrano	Episode: "Sacred Things" (S 1:Ep 11)
2000–2004	Judging Amy	ASA Thelma Ryan	4 episodes
2006	Conviction	Attorney	Episode: "Downhill" (S 1:Ep 8)
2003–2006	Law & Order	Defence Attorney	3 episodes
2007	The Sopranos	Stacey Bellews	Episode: "The Blue Comet" (S 6"Ep 20)
2008	Cashmere Mafia	Dr Faye Lewellyn	Episode: "Conference Call" (S 1:Ep 2)
2008	The Naked Brothers Band	Mindy	3 episodes
2009	Medium	Speech Therapist	Episode: "The Medium is The Message" (S 6"Ep 4)
2015	Live from Lincoln Center	Lillie Hart, Helen	Episode: "Act One" (S 41:Ep 4)
2017	The Good Fight	Magdalena	Episode: "Reddick v Boseman" (S 1:Ep 8)
2018	Indecent	Esther	TV special
