= Mary Heffernan =

Mary Heffernan may refer to:

- Mary Elizabeth Heffernan, American attorney and judge
- Mary Beth Heffernan (artist) (born 1965), Los Angeles-based artist
