= A Fair Country =

Play by Jon Robin Baitz

A Fair Country is a play by Jon Robin Baitz. The play premiered Off-Broadway in 1996, and was a finalist for the 1996 Pulitzer Prize for Drama.

== Productions ==
The play was initially presented by the New York Stage and Film Company at a workshop at Vassar College, Poughkeepsie, New York, in July 1994. Directed by David Warren, the cast featured Justin Kirk (Gil Burgess), Maria Tucci (Patrice Burgess), Ron Rifkin (Harry Burgess), Patrick Breen (Alec Burgess), and Robin Morse (Carley Fletcher).

The play was then produced at Naked Angels Theatre Company, New York, New York, in November 1994. Directed by David Warren, the cast featured Matt McGrath (Gil Burgess), Maria Tucci, Ron Rifkin, Patrick Breen, and Mary McCormack (Carley Fletcher). The play was next workshopped at the Seattle Repertory Theatre in April 1995. Directed by Daniel Sullivan, the cast featured Neil Patrick Harris (Gil Burgess) and Joyce Van Patten (Patrice Burgess).

A Fair Country premiered Off-Broadway at Lincoln Center Mitzi E. Newhouse Theater on February 1, 1996 and closed on June 30, 1996. Directed by Daniel Sullivan, the cast featured Judith Ivey (Patrice Burgess), Laurence Luckinbill (Harry Burgess), Matt McGrath, Dan Futterman (Alec Burgess), and Katie Finneran (Carley Fletcher).

The Los Angeles Theatre Works presented the play in its Radio Drama Series in April 1998, featuring David Dukes, Judith Ivey, Matt McGrath and George Gaynes.

Steppenwolf Theatre Company, Chicago, presented the play from July 9, 1998 to August 14, directed by Scott Zigler.

The play was produced at the Huntington Theatre Company, Boston, in October to November 2000, directed by Anna D. Shapiro.

== Plot ==
In 1987, Gil Burgess is an archeologist, working in Mexico. His estranged mother, Patrice, visits him, and he recalls the past events. In 1977, a teenaged Gil is living with his mother and father, Harry, in Durban, South Africa. Harry is a U.S. Information Officer. Harry wants to leave because of the political unrest, and when his son Alec visits, he sees his chance. Harry is offered a job in the Hague if he will reveal his son Alec's associates in the anti-apartheid underground.

== Awards and nominations ==
The play won the 1996 Lucille Lortel Award, Outstanding Scenic Design, Tony Walton. Judith Ivey was nominated for the 1996 Outer Critics Circle Award, Outstanding Actress in a Play.

The play was a finalist for the 1996 Pulitzer Prize for Drama. The nominating committee said of the play "Written with sharp, pointed dialogue, peopled by vivid characters and played against an international setting of Africa, Europe and Central America."
