= Last Summer in the Hamptons =

- Theatrical release poster
- Directed by: Henry Jaglom
- Written by: Henry Jaglom; Victoria Foyt
- Produced by: Judith Wolinsky
- Starring: Victoria Foyt; Viveca Lindfors; Jon Robin Baitz; Melissa Leo; Martha Plimpton; Andre Gregory; Roddy McDowall; Holland Taylor; Ron Rifkin; Brooke Smith; Roscoe Lee Browne; Kristoffer Tabori
- Distributed by: Rainbow Releasing
- Release date: 1995
- Running time: 108 minutes
- Country: United States
- Language: English

Last Summer in the Hamptons is a 1995 American ensemble comedy-drama film directed by Henry Jaglom and released by Rainbow Releasing and Live Entertainment.

== Plot ==
The plot revolves around a family of theatre actors, directors, and playwrights spending their last summer together at their matriarch's (Viveca Lindfors as Helena Mora) home in the Hamptons. The summer house, named Proskurov (after Jaglom's father), is being sold as the family can no longer afford to keep it. Proskurov has been the site of an intimate outdoor theatrical performance for many summers, and the family (and Helena's interns) are preparing the final details of the show when successful Hollywood actress Oona Hart (Victoria Foyt) arrives. The film explores the dark underbelly of the family (with metaphorical help from Anton Chekhov, Aeschylus, and Tennessee Williams) as Oona attempts to attach herself to them and their theatrical endeavors as she seeks to leave Hollywood and embark on a stage career.

== Cast ==
- Victoria Foyt as Oona Hart
- Viveca Lindfors as Helena Mora (final film role)
- Jon Robin Baitz as Jake Axelrod
- Savannah Smith Boucher as Suzanne
- Roscoe Lee Browne as Freddy
- Andre Gregory as Ivan Axelrod
- Nick Gregory as George
- Melissa Leo as Trish Axelrod
- Roddy McDowall as Thomas
- Martha Plimpton as Chloe Garfield
- Ron Rifkin as Eli Garfield
- Diane Salinger as Marian Mora Garfield
- Brooke Smith as Lou Garfield
- Kristoffer Tabori as Nick Mora
- Holland Taylor as Davis Mora Axelrod

== Box office ==
In the U.S., it grossed $801,894 for an all time ranking of 7,018.
