= Greene Shoots Theatre =

The Greene Shoots Theatre is an amateur theatre company formed in 2002. Greene Shoots Theatre specialise in performing classic texts and adapting them for large ensemble casts. The company's acting style often uses physical theatre, mime and chorus work. The company is made up of current and former students of Berkhamsted School.

A number of productions have been performed at the Edinburgh Festival Fringe including Bertolt Brecht's The Resistible Rise of Arturo Ui, at The Garage Theatre in 2003, Nikolai Gogol's The Government Inspector adapted by Steph Gunary at C Venues on Chambers Street in 2006 and a new adaptation of Molière's Tartuffe by Rob Messik in 2008. In 2010, the company performed a new adaptation of Goldoni's The Venetian Twins and in 2014, an adaption of Jarry's King Ubu both by Steph Gunary. In August 2016, their latest venture, a new adaptation of Molière's The Hypochondriac by Oliver Pengelly and Dawn Wylie was performed at C Venues at the Edinburgh Festival Fringe by a cast of 19. At the 2024 festival, the company took an original work by Elanor Trask and Lily Phelps; 'Hungry like the future.' Set in the 1980's, the production follows Kevin, who is sucked into the code of his commodore '64 gaming console and taken on a trip into the future, meeting characters such as Zark and Muckerburg. the production was directed by Dominic Curtis and performed at TheSpace @ Niddry Street. With a new and exciting cast, Curtis is heading to Fringe '26 this year, directing a production of Shakespeare's 'A Midsummer Night's Dream.' Performed on a thrust stage, the production merges modern and classical influence and promises to be one of Greene Shoots most exciting productions yet.

== Reviews ==
The Resistible Rise of Arturo Ui 2002 Counter Culture Magazine
The Resistible Rise of Arturo Ui 2003 (Three Weeks)
The Government Inspector 2006 Counter Culture Magazine
The Government Inspector 2006 Three Weeks
Tartuffe 2008 ThreeWeeks Review
The Venetian Twins 2010 Edinburgh Spotlight
The Venetian Twins 2010 The New Current
The Venetian Twins 2010 Broadway Baby
The Venetian Twins 2010 ThreeWeeks
