= The Venetian Twins =

1747 Goldoni play

- Original language: Italian
- Written by: Carlo Goldoni
- Subject: Plautus's Menaechmi

Premiere
- Date: 1747

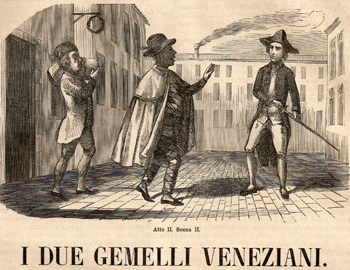

The Venetian Twins (Italian: I due gemelli veneziani, or "The two Venetian twins") is a 1747 play by Carlo Goldoni, based on Plautus's Menaechmi.

It was performed by Il Teatro Stabile of Genoa at the 1965 Edinburgh International Festival, directed by Luigi Squarzina and starring the celebrated Italian actor Alberto Lionello as the two twins. More recent productions include one at the Watermill Theatre and a 1993 production directed by Michael Bogdanov for the Royal Shakespeare Company. The play has also been adapted and staged as a 1979 Australian two-act musical comedy. The play was performed by Greene Shoots Theatre at the Edinburgh Fringe Festival at C Venues (main) in August 2010. Shakespeare & Company (Massachusetts) presented the play in English as part of its outdoor Bankside Festival, June 29-August 27, 2011, at Lenox, Massachusetts.

== Main roles ==
- Dr Balanzoni, a lawyer from Bologna in Verona
- Rosaura, believed to be his daughter, later revealed as the sister of the twins
- Pancrazio, friend of the doctor
- Zanetto, twin brother of Tonino
- Tonino, twin brother of Zanetto
- Lelio, the doctor's nephew
- Beatrice, Tonino's lover
- Florindo, Tonino's friend
- Brighella, servant in the doctor's house
- Colombina, servant in the doctor's house
- Arlecchino, servant of Zanetto
- Tiburzio, goldsmith
- Bargello
