= Daniel J. Sullivan =

American dramatist (born 1940)

- Born: Daniel John Sullivan; June 11, 1940 (age 86); Wray, Colorado, U.S.
- Occupations: Theatre director, playwright
- Spouses: Shelley Plimpton (m. 1990; div. 1997): Mimi Lieber
- Children: 3

Daniel John Sullivan (born June 11, 1940) is an American theatre and film director and playwright.

== Life and career ==
Sullivan was born in Wray, Colorado, the son of Mary Catherine (née Hutton) and John Martin Sullivan. He was raised in San Francisco, where he graduated from San Francisco State University. In 1963, he began his professional career as an actor at the city's Actor's Workshop, where he remained for two years.

Sullivan worked as both an actor and director with the Lincoln Center Repertory Company in the late 1960s and 1970s. His directorial debut there was A. R. Gurney's Scenes from American Life in 1971. for which he won a Drama Desk Award.

Following two years as Resident Director of the Seattle Repertory Theatre, he assumed the position of Artistic Director in 1981, serving until 1997. It was there that he directed the first production of his own play, Inspecting Carol.

Sullivan has forged successful working relationships with many prominent American playwrights. He directed Herb Gardner's Tony winning I'm Not Rappaport at Seattle Rep before staging it off-Broadway, on Broadway, in London's West End, and the United States national tour. He reteamed with Gardner to stage Conversations with My Father in Seattle, New York City, and Los Angeles. His first association with Wendy Wasserstein was the Pulitzer Prize and Tony-winning The Heidi Chronicles, which he directed off Broadway, on Broadway and its National Tour. The duo later collaborated on The Sisters Rosensweig on Broadway and the National Tour, An American Daughter, and Ms. Wasserstein's final play, Third. He directed both the off-Broadway and screen version of Jon Robin Baitz's The Substance of Fire, as well as the original productions of A Fair Country and Ten Unknowns in New York, and Baitz's translation of Hedda Gabler in Los Angeles. His collaborations with Donald Margulies include the Pulitzer-Prize-winning Dinner with Friends in New York and Los Angeles, the Broadway revival of Sight Unseen, and the Broadway productions of Brooklyn Boy and the 2010 Broadway production of Time Stands Still.

Sullivan has directed most of Charlayne Woodard's plays: Pretty Fire (Seattle Rep, 1994-95), Neat (Seattle Rep, 1996–97), Stories (Seattle Rep, May 1999), In Real Life (Mark Taper Forum, July 2001 and Manhattan Theatre Club, October 2002) and The Nightwatcher.

Other Broadway credits include Retreat From Moscow, Morning's at Seven, Proof, Major Barbara, A Moon for the Misbegotten, Accent on Youth, The Homecoming, Rabbit Hole, Prelude to a Kiss, After The Night And The Music, Julius Caesar, and Ah, Wilderness!. For Shakespeare in the Park at the Delacorte, Sullivan directed The Merry Wives of Windsor, A Midsummer Night’s Dream (2007) and Twelfth Night (2009).

Other Off-Broadway credits include Stuff Happens, Intimate Apparel, Ancestral Voices, Spinning into Butter, Far East, London Suite, Psychopathia Sexualis, The American Clock, and Good People.

At The Old Globe Theatre, Sullivan directed Julius Caesar, Cymbeline (1999), Romeo and Juliet (1998), Merry Wives of Windsor and Othello, and at South Coast Repertory he directed Hamlet, A Midsummer Night's Dream, Taming of the Shrew and Volpone.

Sullivan's Broadway acting credits include the 1973 revival of A Streetcar Named Desire, The Merchant of Venice (1973), The Playboy of the Western World (1971), The Good Person of Szechwan, and Camino Real.

In addition to his directing, Sullivan currently holds the Swanlund Chair at the University of Illinois, Urbana-Champaign. In 2026, Sullivan announced his retirement from the theatrical industry.

== Personal life ==
Sullivan has a son and two daughters. From 1990 to 1997, he was married to actress Shelley Plimpton. His wife Mimi Lieber is an actress, choreographer and noted acting teacher.

== Stage productions ==
- The Little Foxes (2017)
- All's Well That Ends Well (2011)
- Good People (2011)
- The Merchant of Venice (2010 revival)
- Twelfth Night (2009)
- Prelude to a Kiss (2007 revival)
- Rabbit Hole (2006)
- After the Night and the Music (2005)
- Julius Caesar (2005)
- Brooklyn Boy (2005)
- Intimate Apparel (2004)
- Sight Unseen (2004)
- The Retreat from Moscow (2003)
- Morning's at Seven (2002 revival)
- Major Barbara (2001)
- Proof (2000)
- A Moon for the Misbegotten (2000 revival)
- Ah, Wilderness! (1998)
- The Plough and the Stars (1973)
- Narrow Road to the Deep North (1972)

== Filmography ==
- The Substance of Fire (1996)
- Stage on Screen: Far East (2001)

== Awards and nominations ==
Awards

- 1972 Drama Desk Award for Most Promising Director - Suggs
- 2001 Tony Award for Best Direction of a Play - Proof
- In 2011 he was inducted into the American Theatre Hall of Fame.

Nominations

- 1989 Drama Desk Award for Outstanding Director of a Play - The Heidi Chronicles
- 1989 Tony Award for Best Direction of a Play - The Heidi Chronicles
- 1992 Tony Award for Best Direction of a Play - Conversations With My Father
- 1993 Drama Desk Award for Outstanding Director of a Play - The Sisters Rosensweig
- 1993 Tony Award for Best Direction of a Play - The Sisters Rosensweig
- 2000 Drama Desk Award for Outstanding Director of a Play - Dinner with Friends
- 2002 Tony Award for Best Direction of a Play - Morning's at Seven
- 2006 Drama Desk Award for Outstanding Director of a Play - Stuff Happens
- 2006 Tony Award for Best Direction of a Play - Rabbit Hole
- 2011 Drama Desk Award for Outstanding Director of a Play - The Merchant of Venice
- 2011 Tony Award for Best Direction of a Play - The Merchant of Venice
- 2017 Drama Desk Award for Outstanding Director of a Play - If I Forget
- 2017 Drama Desk Award for Outstanding Director of a Play - The Little Foxes
- 2017 Tony Award for Best Direction of a Play - The Little Foxes
