= Fritz Hochwälder =

Austrian playwright (1911–1986)

Fritz Hochwälder

Fritz Hochwälder (28 May 1911 – 21 October 1986) also known as Fritz Hochwaelder, was an Austrian playwright. Known for his spare prose and strong moralist themes, Hochwälder won several literary awards, including the Grand Austrian State Prize for Literature in 1966. Most of his plays were first performed at the Burgtheater in Vienna.

== Biography ==
Born in Vienna, Austria, Hochwälder wrote social and political dramas, using historical themes in his plays. One of his earlier works Das Heilige Experiment (1942; adapted for the screen in 1959: The Strong Are Lonely) drew on the violent dismantling of a utopian Jesuit settlement by the Spaniards in Paraguay in the 1760s and Der öffentliche Ankläger (The Public Prosecutor, 1948) delved into the violence of the French Revolution. The theme of violence was a major factor in his own life—in fact, without the Nazi rise to power, Hochwälder may not have become a successful playwright.

Before the beginning of World War II, Hochwälder worked as a craftsman (an upholsterer's apprentice) in Vienna. In 1938, Hochwälder escaped Austria and the Nazis by entering Switzerland illegally. He escaped after waiting futilely for an entry visa from any country and in this way his experiences reinforced the Zionist leader Chaim Weizmann's ironic quip that in those days the world was divided into two kinds of countries: countries that wanted to be rid of Jews and those that refused to accept them. (Hochwälder's parents were both murdered in Theresienstadt concentration camp in the Czech Republic.)

After entering Switzerland, Hochwälder spent some time in internment camps. As he was barred by the Swiss from working in his profession, he began in earnest to write plays (he had also written plays in pre-war Vienna without much critical success).

After he left the camps, he lived in Zurich where he met and was influenced by Georg Kaiser, another exiled playwright. Kaiser was his senior by several decades and also wrote tightly constructed plays with psychological underpinnings and a strong moralist stance. Hochwälder's 1945 play Der Flüchtling (The Refugee) was attributed by the author to a suggestion from the German dramatist.

Martin Esslin, the renowned drama professor and theater critic, wrote in the introduction to The Public Prosecutor and Other Plays: "No one who has come into contact with Hochwälder's dramatic work, no one who has been privileged to meet him in person, can fail to be impressed by the integrity, the sheer straightforward commitment to the highest value of decency and civilization that are the hallmarks of the writer and craftsman as well as the man."

Esslin, who translated some of Hochwälder's plays into English, also commented on the juxtaposition of violent themes with a humanistic message. "Again and again the message that his plays leave with the attentive reader and spectator is one of the humanity, forgiveness, reconciliation, and a refusal to fall into the trap set by the violent to the nonviolent, of converting them to their own methods."

Esslin, who coined the term "Theatre of the Absurd", may well have found compelling Hochwälder's often paradoxical plot twists. For example, Der Himbeerpflücker (The Raspberry Picker, 1965) is a satirical play showing how the leaders of an Austrian town mistake a small town crook for a Nazi war criminal and treat him as a returning hero. This play was undoubtedly a homage to Nikolai Gogol's The Government Inspector, but Hochwälder was able to put his own historical spin and moral message on the saga of mistaken identity.

Although Hochwälder spent most of his life after the war in Switzerland, he was buried in Vienna.

== Honours and awards ==
- 1955 City of Vienna Prize for Literature
- 1956 Grillparzer Prize
- 1962 Anton Wildgans Prize
- 1966 Grand Austrian State Prize for Literature
- 1971 Austrian Cross of Honour for Science and Art, 1st class
- 1972 Ring of Honour of the City of Vienna
- 1979 Franz Theodor Csokor Award
- 1980 Austrian Decoration for Science and Art

== Works ==
- Die unziemliche Neugier (1934; published in 1979)
- Esther (1940)
- Das heilige Experiment (1942)
- Hôtel du Commerce (1944)
- Meier Helmbrecht (1946)
- Der öffentliche Ankläger (1948)
- Donadieu (1953)
- Die Herberge (1955)
- Der Unschuldige (1958)
- Donnerstag (1959)
- Holokaust.(Totengericht) (1960; published 1998)
- 1003 (1963)
- Der Himbeerpflücker (1964)
- Der Befehl (1968)
- Lazaretti oder Der Säbeltiger (1973)
- Die Prinzessin von Chimay (1982)
- Der verschwundene Mond (1982)
- Die Bürgschaft (1984)
- Donnerstag. Roman (1995)

== See also ==
- List of Austrian writers
