= The Great Eastern (Rodman novel) =

2019 novel by Howard A. Rodman

First edition

The Great Eastern by Howard A. Rodman is an anticolonial adventure novel, set in the 1850s-1870s in New York, London, India, Paris and the North Atlantic. Pitted against each other are two great 19th-century fictional anti-heroes, Jules Verne's Captain Nemo and Herman Melville's Captain Ahab. One lives beneath the waves and hates everything upon them. The other lives upon the waves and hates everything beneath. Caught in between is Isambard Kingdom Brunel, the preeminent civil engineer of Victorian England, kidnapped and pressed into service to build Nemo his submarine, and join him in his battle against the modern world. Melville House Publishing published it on June 4, 2019.

The Los Angeles Review of Books praised the work, calling it "a pastiche in the best postmodern sense: it’s intense, invigorating, and faithful to the originals while still breaking new ground." Leonard Maltin, film critic and Rodman "colleague ... at the USC School of Cinematic Arts," praised the book, calling it a "glorious and expansive new novel."

In March 2019, the film rights to the book were acquired by the UK film company Great Point Media, and Rodman was commissioned to write the screen adaptation.
