= I'm Not Rappaport =

1984 play by Herb Gardner

- Original language: English
- Written by: Herb Gardner
- Characters: Nat; Midge; Gilley; Danforth; Laurie; Clara; The Cowboy
- Genre: Comedy
- Setting: A park bench in Central Park; October 1982

Premiere
- Date: 1984
- Place: Seattle Repertory Theatre; Seattle, Washington

I'm Not Rappaport is a play by Herb Gardner, which originally ran on Broadway in 1985.

== Productions ==
The play was originally staged by Seattle Repertory Theatre in 1984.

The play premiered on Broadway at the Booth Theatre on November 19, 1985, and closed on January 17, 1988, after 891 performances. Directed by Daniel Sullivan, the cast starred Judd Hirsch (Nat), Cleavon Little (Midge Carter), Jace Alexander (Gilley), and Mercedes Ruehl (Clara).

The production received Tony Awards for Best Play, Best Lighting Design, and Best Actor (Judd Hirsch).

Sherman Hemsley starred in the play in 1987 in Calgary.

A revival opened at the Booth Theatre on July 25, 2002, where it ran for 53 performances and 15 previews. Again directed by Sullivan, Hirsch reprised his role and was joined by Ben Vereen.

Prior to the Broadway 2002 production, the play had engagements at three regional venues: the Coconut Grove Playhouse, Miami, in January 2002; Ford's Theater, Washington, D.C., in February 2002; and the Paper Mill Playhouse, New Jersey, in February and March 2002. The play, directed by Sullivan, starred Hirsch and Ben Vereen.

== Plot ==
Inspired by two elderly men Gardner met in New York City's Central Park, the play focuses on Nat Moyer, a feisty Jew, and Midge Carter, a cantankerous African-American, who spend their days sitting on a bench. They both mask the realities of aging, sharing tall tales that Nat spins. The play touches on several issues, including society's treatment of the aging, the difficulties dealing with adult children who think they know what's best for their parents, and the dangers that lurk in urban areas.

Its title comes from an old vaudeville joke, a variation of which evolved into dialogue between the two protagonists:

- Nat: Hey, Rappaport! I haven't seen you in ages. How have you been?
- Midge: I'm not Rappaport.
- Nat: Rappaport, what happened to you? You used to be a short fat guy, and now you're a tall skinny guy.
- Midge: I'm not Rappaport.
- Nat: Rappaport, you used to be a young guy with a beard, and now you're an old guy with a mustache.
- Midge: I'm not Rappaport.
- Nat: Rappaport, how has this happened? You used to be a cowardly little white guy, and now you're a big imposing black guy.
- Midge: I'm not Rappaport.
- Nat: And you changed your name, too!

== Film adaptation ==
The 1996 film version, written and directed by Gardner, starred Walter Matthau, Ossie Davis, Amy Irving, Craig T. Nelson, Martha Plimpton, Peter Friedman, and Ron Rifkin.

== Adaptations ==
In 1986 at the Apollo Theatre London, the part of Nat was played by Paul Scofield.

In 2012, a theatre group in Germany came under fire for allowing a white actor to paint his face and take the part of the black character Midge Carter on stage.

In 2014, a Spanish speaking adaptation, Parque Lezama, premiered at the Teatro Liceo, in Buenos Aires, Argentina. It was directed by Academy Award winner Juan José Campanella, and starred Eduardo Blanco (as Antonio/Midge) and Luis Brandoni (as León/Nat).

== Awards and nominations ==
Source: PlaybillVault

- 1986 Tony Award for Best Play – winner
- 1986 Tony Award, Actor in a Play (Hirsch) – winner
- 1986 Tony Award, Lighting Design (Play or Musical) (Pat Collins) – winner
- 1986 Outer Critics Circle Award, John Gassner Award (Gardner) – winner
- 1986 Outer Critics Circle Award, Outstanding Actor in a Play (Hirsch) – winner
- 1986 Outer Critics Circle Award, Outstanding New Broadway Play – winner
