= The Raspberry Picker =

- Theater Program for Der Himbeerpflücker (The Raspberry Picker), Städtische Theater Leipzig, 1966
- Original title: Der Himbeerpflücker
- Original language: German
- Written by: Fritz Hochwälder

Premiere
- Date: 1965
- Place: Zurich Schauspielhaus
- Directed by: Gerhard Klingenberg

The Raspberry Picker (Der Himbeerpflücker) is a 1965 anti-fascist satire by Austrian playwright Fritz Hochwälder. The widely-produced play, which was also seen on Austrian television, is modeled on The Government Inspector by Nikolai Gogol.

== Plot ==
A petty thief seeks lodging at a rural inn, where the town leaders mistake him for a notorious Nazi war criminal on the run from the authorities. The Mayor, the Doctor, the Teacher, the Builder, and the Lawyer all attempt to curry favor with the man they believe is “The Raspberry Picker,” a concentration camp officer rumored to have shot over 8,000 prisoners.

The townsfolk are unrepentant Nazis who still believe in blood and honor nationalism, simultaneously romanticizing the "heroics" of the war years and attempting to dismiss its atrocities as ancient history. The town leaders have profited from crimes they committed during the war, so they are motivated to ingratiate themselves to the Raspberry Picker and also to abet his escape, so they will not be exposed.

The thief, at first confused by this case of mistaken identity, decides to accept the flattery and gifts of the town leaders. By the end of the play, his true identity is revealed, and he is arrested for robbing a jewelry store. As the only character horrified by fascist atrocity, the small-time thief expresses his pride in not being the Nazi monster the townsfolk assumed him to be. The real monsters are the “respectable citizens” who attempt to bury the past while still profiting from it.

== Productions ==
Hochwälder fled Austria in 1938 and wrote The Raspberry Picker while living in exile in Switzerland, where the play premiered in 1965. The production at the Zurich Schauspielhaus was helmed by Austrian director Gerhard Klingenberg with a predominantly Viennese cast.

The same year, ORF (Austrian Broadcasting) produced a television version, starring Helmut Qualtinger and Lukas Ammann. The BBC aired a radio version in an English translation by Michael Bullock in 1967.

Subsequent Austrian productions include revivals at Schauspielhaus Graz (1967), Kammerspiel Linz (1975), Volkstheater Vienna (1986), and Theater am Kornmarkt Bergenz (1997).

The American Jewish Theatre produced an English translation of The Raspberry Picker in New York at the 92nd Street Y in 1982, featuring Earl Hammond and John Fiedler.

Theater in der Josefstadt (Vienna) produced the play under the direction of Klaus Rohrmoser in 1996. The same theater mounted a new production in 2023, directed by Stephanie Mohr.

== Critical reception ==
Variety praised the 1965 premiere and credited Hochwälder for handling the subject matter “skillfully and with theatrical effectiveness, with biting humor and fierce sarcasm.” The New York Times was critical of the 1982 production, asserting that the play “isn’t sure whether it’s a comedy with serious overtones or a philosophical drama with comic overtones.”

Reviewing the 2023 revival at Theater in der Josefstadt, Der Standard noted that this "study of evil in the homeland" was more explosive in its original production, since "all the perpetrators were sitting in the theater audience." A generation later, "slapstick as a directing concept" made the play more successful as a comedy.

Claudius von Stolzmann, who played the role of Zagl, the harried servant at the inn, in the Josefstadt production, won the 2024 Nestroy Prize for Best Actor.

== English language publication ==
Editions including Michael Bullock's translation:

- Fritz Hochwälder. The Public Prosecutor and Other Plays. Frederick Ungar Publishing Co., 1980
- Douglas A. Russell, ed. An Anthology of Austrian Drama. Associated University Presses, 1982
