= Fallen Angels: Six Noir Tales Told for Television =

1993 book by Various

- Book cover
- Author: Various
- Language: English
- Genre: Anthology
- Publisher: Grove Press
- Publication date: September 1, 1993
- Publication place: United States
- Media type: Hardback; Paperback
- Pages: 274 pages
- ISBN: 0-8021-3383-5
- OCLC: 28291287
- Dewey Decimal: 812/.02508 20
- LC Class: PN6120.T4 F35 1993

Fallen Angels: Six Noir Tales Told for Television is a 1993 anthology, published by Grove Press as a tie-in to the Showtime television series Fallen Angels that appeared in the fall of 1993.

The book contains six stories by six masters of hard-boiled noir and the teleplays for their film adaptations.

The hard-boiled stories were written by: Raymond Chandler, Jim Thompson, William Campbell Gault, Cornell Woolrich, Jonathan Craig and James Ellroy.

Preface: by James Ellroy.

== Stories ==
- "Dead End for Delia", by William Campbell Gault.
- "I'll Be Waiting", by Raymond Chandler.
- "The Quiet Room", by Jonathan Craig.
- "The Frightening Frammis", by Jim Thompson.
- "Murder Obliquely", by Cornell Woolrich.
- "Since I Don't Have You", by James Ellroy.

== Screenplays ==
- "Dead End for Delia", by Scott Frank.
- "I'll Be Waiting", by C. Gaby Mitchell.
- "The Quiet Room", by Howard A. Rodman.
- "The Frightening Frammis", by Jon Robin Baitz and Howard A. Rodman.
- "Murder Obliquely", by Amanda Silver.
- "Since I Don't Have You", by Steven Katz.

== See also ==
- Fallen Angels.
- List of Fallen Angels episodes.
