= Inspecting Carol =

Play written by Daniel J. Sullivan

Inspecting Carol is a comedic play by Daniel J. Sullivan, written in 1991 and produced by the Seattle Repertory Theatre. It is a variation on the play The Inspector General by Nikolai Gogol.

This play is about a small professional theatre company in a midsized city. This company has performed the same play, "A Christmas Carol", to the same community, with the same actors, for far too long. The company strives to maintain funding even as they receive financial cuts. They learn that they will be inspected in order to receive a grant, which they need in order to remain open. They fall all over themselves trying to schmooze the man they believe to be the person responsible for issuing the grant. As more and more things go wrong, the company tries to deal with each other while getting through the show.

== The Characters ==
- MJ: The over-the-top stage manager who also plays Martha Cratchit in the show within a show.
- Wayne: The wannabe actor (a guy who insists on reading every character as King Richard III) mistaken for the inspector. The company lets him make terrible changes because they think they will get money from him.
- Zorah: The insane, Lithuanian director: She is extremely temperamental and constantly on the verge of a meltdown.
- Luther: The boy who is entirely way too big to be playing Tiny Tim anymore. Leaves halfway after Act I because he has booked a TV show
- Dorothy: The British dialect coach who also plays Emily Cratchit. Trying to push her duo show with her husband Sydney on Wayne.
- Sydney: Plays the ghost of Jacob Marley and Fezziwig. Constantly making noise with his ghostly chains, even as Fezziwig.
- Phil: Plays Bob Cratchit. Is in love with Zorah due to their one night stand.
- Walter: The company's first black actor, hired on as a "multi-cultural ethnic outreach". Doesn't know any of his lines. Plays all three ghosts. Constantly laments about having to point at everything using a WHITE hand.
- Kevin: The company's financial director. Nervous eater, tries to suck up to the inspector as much as possible. Afraid of Zorah.
- Bart: The semi-douchey guy who plays all of the other male roles in the show.
- Larry: Plays Ebenezer Scrooge. Middle-aged man whose wife left him. He buries all these emotions and instead acts out by trying to put as much social justice in the show. Did the show in Spanish last year because he got bored and wanted to make a tribute to 3rd world countries.
- Betty: The inspector. Watches Act II from on stage. Gets punch spilled on her and consequently comes out dressed as the Queen at the end of the show, as that is the only costume they had in stock that fit her
