= The Substance of Fire =

1996 film directed by Daniel J. Sullivan

Cover from the L.A. Theatre Works audiocassette with Ron Rifkin and Shirley Knight

The Substance of Fire is a play by Jon Robin Baitz.

== Overview ==
Isaac Geldhart is a survivor of the Holocaust. He arrived in New York City as an orphan, reinvented himself as a bon vivant, married well, and found fame and fortune as a champion of authors who are passionate about their work rather than its best-seller potential. He faces a family-business conflict, the potential Japanese takeover of his increasingly insolvent firm. He must browbeat his three children, all principal stockholders whom he dismisses in varying degrees, into accepting his plan to publish a six-volume scholarly work on Nazi medical experiments, despite their belief that a highly successful commercial novel is the only thing that will keep them from going under.

== Productions ==
The play premiered at the Long Wharf Theatre, New Haven, Connecticut, in 1990 directed by David Warren in a workshop.

The Substance of Fire opened Off-Broadway at Playwrights Horizons on March 17, 1991. Directed by Daniel Sullivan, the cast included Ron Rifkin, Sarah Jessica Parker, Patrick Breen, and Jon Tenney.

The play transferred to the Lincoln Center's Newhouse Theater on January 31, 1992. The play closed on July 26, 1992, after 205 performances.

Rifkin won the Drama Desk Award for Outstanding Actor in a Play. The play won the 1992 Lucille Lortel Awards, Outstanding Director, Daniel Sullivan and Outstanding Actor, Ron Rifkin.

The play was presented at the Mark Taper Forum in January 1993. Directed by Sullivan, the cast featured Patrick Breen (Martin Geldhart), Ron Rifkin (Isaac Geldhart), Jon Tenney (Aaron Geldhart), and Gena Rowlands (Marge Hackett).

The play was revived Off-Broadway by Second Stage Theatre, opening on April 27, 2014. Directed by Trip Cullman, the cast featured John Noble, Halley Feiffer, Daniel Eric Gold, and Charlayne Woodard.

=== Film ===
Baitz and Sullivan reteamed for the film version, in which Rifkin and Parker reprised their stage roles. The cast also included Timothy Hutton, Tony Goldwyn, Lee Grant, Elizabeth Franz, Dick Latessa, and Eric Bogosian. Viola Davis received her Screen Actors Guild card for doing one day of work on the film, playing a nurse who passes a vial of blood to future How to Get Away with Murder co-star Timothy Hutton.

The film was released by Miramax in the United States in 1996, after being shown at several film festivals, including the Deauville Festival du Film Americain (August–September 1996), Boston Film Festival (September 1996), and Mill Valley Film Festival (October 1996). Sullivan was nominated for the Grand Special Prize at the Deauville Film Festival.

== See also ==
- List of Holocaust films
