= Jon Robin Baitz =

American dramatist

- Baitz in 2026
- Born: November 4, 1961 (age 65); Los Angeles, California, U.S.
- Occupations: Playwright, screenwriter, television producer, actor
- Notable work: Other Desert Cities, The Substance of Fire, Brothers & Sisters, Three Hotels, A Fair Country
- Partner: Joe Mantello (1990–2002)

Jon Robin Baitz (born November 4, 1961) is an American playwright, screenwriter, and television producer. He is a two-time Pulitzer Prize finalist, as well as a Guggenheim, American Academy of Arts and Letters, and National Endowment for the Arts Fellow.

== Early life and education ==
Baitz was born to a Jewish family in Los Angeles, California, the son of Edward Baitz, an executive of the Carnation Company. Baitz was raised in Brazil and South Africa before the family returned to California, where he attended Beverly Hills High School. On speaking about the influence of his time growing up abroad on his life and work, Baitz states:

I think what happened was that I felt so foreign so often that I became very adept at observing. I learned a kind of short hand. Because you’re a foreigner, an alien really, you have to decode all of the customs and the manners, not just the language. So you begin to feel terribly detached which is not a good thing. And it had that effect upon my writing initially. You start this little dialogue with yourself about what things mean and then suddenly you’re 20-something-years-old and you’re continuing that dialogue on paper.

== Career ==
After graduation from high school, Baitz did not attend college, instead he worked as a bookstore clerk and assistant to two producers, and the experiences became the basis for his first play, a one-acter entitled Mizlansky/Zilinsky. He drew on his own background for his first two-act play, The Film Society, about the staff of a prep school in South Africa. Its 1987 success in Los Angeles led to an Off-Broadway production with Nathan Lane in 1988, which earned him a Drama Desk Award nomination for Outstanding New Play.

This was followed by The Substance of Fire in 1991 with Ron Rifkin and Sarah Jessica Parker and The End of the Day Off-Broadway at Playwrights Horizons in 1992, starring Roger Rees.

Baitz wrote and directed the two-character play Three Hotels, based on his parents, for a presentation on PBS's American Playhouse, in March 1991. The cast starred Richard Jordan and Kate Nelligan. He then reworked the material for a stage play, earning a Drama Desk Award nomination for Outstanding New Play.

In 1993, he co-scripted (with Howard A. Rodman) "The Frightening Frammis", which was directed by Tom Cruise and aired as an episode of the Showtime anthology series Fallen Angels. Two years later, Henry Jaglom cast him as a gay playwright who achieves success at an early age - a character inspired by Baitz himself - in the film Last Summer in the Hamptons. In 1996 he appeared as Michelle Pfeiffer's business associate in the film comedy One Fine Day.

His semi-autobiographical play A Fair Country was presented Off-Broadway at the Lincoln Center Mitzi E. Newhouse Theater in 1996. The play was one of the three finalists for the 1996 Pulitzer Prize for Drama. The nominating committee said of the play "Written with sharp, pointed dialogue, peopled by vivid characters and played against an international setting of Africa, Europe and Central America."

Subsequent stage works include Mizlansky/Zilinsky or "Schmucks," a revised version of Mizlansky/Zilinsky, starring Nathan Lane, and directed by Baitz's then-partner Joe Mantello (1998), a new adaptation of Henrik Ibsen's Hedda Gabler (first at L.A.'s Geffen Playhouse with Annette Bening in 1999, then at Long Island's Bay Street Theater with Kate Burton in 2000, followed by a Broadway production with the same star the following year), Ten Unknowns (2001), starring Donald Sutherland and Julianna Margulies, and The Paris Letter (2005) with Ron Rifkin and John Glover. His screenplays include the adaptation of his own Substance of Fire (1996), with Tony Goldwyn and Timothy Hutton joining original cast members Rifkin and Parker, and People I Know (2002), which starred Al Pacino.

From 2002 to 2005, Baitz had considerable success writing freelance scripts for The West Wing and Alias. In the case of The West Wing, his first draft was so polished that Sorkin himself shot the episode “pretty much word for word.” In the summer of 2005, that glimmer of first draft perfection led to his position as creator and executive producer of the ABC TV drama Brothers & Sisters, which premiered in September 2006 and ran for five seasons, ending in May 2011.

Baitz was the New School for Drama's artist in residence for the 2009–2010 school year.

His play Other Desert Cities opened Off-Broadway at the Mitzi E. Newhouse Theater (Lincoln Center) in New York on January 13, 2011, starring Stockard Channing, Linda Lavin, Stacy Keach, Thomas Sadoski and Elizabeth Marvel. The play was originally titled Love and Mercy. The production transferred to Broadway, opened at the Booth Theatre on November 3, 2011, with Judith Light replacing Lavin and Rachel Griffiths replacing Marvel.

One fan of Other Desert Cities was director Roland Emmerich, who then hired Baitz to write the screenplay for his 2015 film Stonewall, based on the Stonewall riots.

In 2019, Baitz generated controversy when he became the first member of the WGA to defy the guild's directive that members fire their talent agents, amid ongoing negotiations with the Association of Talent Agents over the practice of packaging. Baitz defended his decision in a letter to the guild's leaders, stating that his agents at CAA had stuck by him during bad times, including both during, and after the 2007-2008 writers' strike. Baitz maintains financial core status.

More recently, Baitz's work in television includes the NBC miniseries The Slap, which he wrote and produced. He wrote and executive produced FX/Hulu's Feud: Capote vs. The Swans with Ryan Murphy, with whom he also collaborated on Doctor Odyssey for ABC, Grotesquerie for FX/Hulu, and All's Fair also for Hulu and starring Kim Kardashian, which shoots in 2024.

== Awards and recognition ==
Baitz has received a Rockefeller Foundation Award and a Drama Desk Award; he is a Guggenheim Fellow, and was a Pulitzer Prize finalist for A Fair Country. In 1991, he won a Humanitas Award for the PBS-TV's American Playhouse version of Three Hotels which he also directed. He was also a Pulitzer Prize finalist for Other Desert Cities in 2012.

== Personal life ==
From 1990 to 2002, Baitz was the romantic partner of actor and director Joe Mantello.

== Works ==
=== Stage (selected) ===
- The Film Society—1988
- The Substance of Fire—1992, 2014
- Three Hotels—1993, 1993 Drama Desk Award Outstanding New Play nominee
- A Fair Country —1996
- Mizlansky/Zilinsky or Schmucks—1998
- Hedda Gabler (adaptation) -- 2001
- Ten Unknowns—2001, 2001 Lucille Lortel Award nominee, Outstanding Play
- The Paris Letter—2005, 2006 Lucille Lortel Award nominee, Outstanding Play
- Other Desert Cities—2011
- Vicuña—2016
- I'll Be Seein' Ya—2022

=== Film and television ===
- Three Hotels (American Playhouse) -- PBS, 1991
- Fallen Angels—episode "The Frightening Frammis", Showtime, 1993
- Last Summer in the Hamptons—1995 (actor)
- One Fine Day—1996 (actor)
- The Substance of Fire—1996
- People I Know—2002
- The West Wing—season 4 episode "The Long Goodbye", 2003
- Alias—episode "In Dreams...", 2005
- Brothers & Sisters -- ABC television series, 2006–2011
- The Slap -- NBC miniseries, 2015
- Stonewall—2015
- Feud: Capote vs. The Swans—2024
- Grotesquerie—2024
- American Horror Stories—episode "Backrooms", 2024
- Doctor Odyssey—2024-2025
- All's Fair—2025-present
- Hexed—2026

== See also ==
- Dramatic license
- LGBT culture in New York City
- List of LGBT people from New York City
- NYC Pride March
