= Fallen Angels (American TV series) =

American anthology television series (1993–1995)

- VHS cover
- Also known as: Perfect Crimes (in Europe)
- Genre: Anthology; Neo-noir
- Developed by: Steve Golin
- Presented by: Lynette Walden (season 1)
- Narrated by: Miguel Ferrer (season 2)
- Opening theme: Elmer Bernstein
- Country of origin: United States
- Original language: English
- No. of seasons: 2
- No. of episodes: 15

Production
- Executive producer: Sydney Pollack
- Producers: Steve Golin; William Horberg
- Camera setup: Single-camera
- Running time: 30 minutes
- Production companies: Propaganda Films; Mirage Enterprises

Original release
- Network: Showtime
- Release: August 1, 1993 – November 19, 1995

Fallen Angels is an American neo-noir anthology television series that ran from August 1, 1993, to November 19, 1995, on the Showtime pay cable station and was produced by Propaganda Films. No first-run episodes were shown in 1994.

The series was executive produced by Sydney Pollack and produced by Steve Golin and others. The theme song was written by Elmer Bernstein and the original music was written by Peter Bernstein.

Each episode is based on a story by a noted hardboiled crime writer, including Raymond Chandler, Jim Thompson, Cornell Woolrich, James Ellroy, Evan Hunter, Mickey Spillane, Dashiell Hammett and Walter Mosley.

Period torch songs by performers like Patti Page and Billie Holiday were used periodically.

In Europe, the show is known as Perfect Crimes and shown in France on Canal +, and in the United Kingdom.

== Crew ==
Directors:

- Peter Bogdanovich
- Tom Cruise
- Alfonso Cuarón
- John Dahl
- Keith Gordon
- Tom Hanks
- Agnieszka Holland
- Tim Hunter
- Phil Joanou
- Jonathan Kaplan
- Michael Lehmann
- Jim McBride
- Steven Soderbergh
- Kiefer Sutherland

Writers:

- Jon Robin Baitz
- Scott Frank
- Steven Katz
- Don Macpherson
- C. Gaby Mitchell
- Frank Pugliese
- Howard A. Rodman
- Allan Scott
- David Siegel & Scott McGehee
- Amanda Silver
- Alan Trustman
- Richard Wesley
- Donald E. Westlake

== Guest stars ==
First Season (1993)

- Gary Oldman, Gabrielle Anwar, Dan Hedaya, Wayne Knight and Meg Tilly
- Tom Hanks, Marg Helgenberger, Jon Polito and Bruno Kirby
- Joe Mantegna, Vinessa Shaw, Patrick Breen, J.E. Freeman, Kathy Kinney and Bonnie Bedelia
- Peter Gallagher, Nancy Travis, John C. Reilly and Isabella Rossellini
- Laura Dern, Alan Rickman, Robin Bartlett, Michael Vartan and Diane Lane
- Gary Busey, Tim Matheson, David Bottomley, Aimee Graham, Dick Miller, Elaine Hendrix, Ken Lerner and James Woods

Second Season (1995)

- Mädchen Amick, Johnathon Schaech, Danny Trejo, Edward Bunker and Kiefer Sutherland
- Brendan Fraser, Bruce Ramsay and Peter Coyote
- Eric Stoltz, Richard Portnow, Estelle Harris and Jennifer Grey
- Dana Delany, Marcia Gay Harden, William Petersen, Adam Baldwin and Benicio del Toro
- Bill Pullman, Dan Hedaya, Kim Coates, Jon Favreau, Dean Norris, Jack Nance, Bert Remsen, Grace Zabriskie and Heather Graham
- Miguel Ferrer, Grace Zabriskie, Lucinda Jenney, Peter Dobson and Peter Berg
- Michael Rooker, Laura San Giacomo, Peter Berg, Arnold Vosloo, Kristin Minter, Darren McGavin and Christopher Lloyd
- Danny Glover, Kelly Lynch, Ron Rifkin, Dan Hedaya, Miguel Sandoval and Valeria Golino
- Bill Nunn, Giancarlo Esposito, Cynda Williams and Roger Guenveur Smith

== Episodes ==
Season	Episodes	Originally released	
Season	Episodes	First released	Last released
1	6	August 1, 1993	September 26, 1993
2	9	October 8, 1995	November 19, 1995

=== Season 1 (1993) ===
No. overall	No. in season	Title	Directed by	Written by	Original release date
1	1	"Dead-End for Delia"	Phil Joanou	Scott Frank	August 1, 1993
Detective Kelley (Gary Oldman) is called to investigate the murder of his wife Delia (Gabrielle Anwar), a dance-hall hostess. • Awards: Two CableACE Awards — Gary Oldman, Outstanding Actor; Declan Quinn, Direction of Photography. Original Source: William Campbell Gault (1910–1995), novelette of the same name published in Black Mask Magazine, November 1950
2	2	"I'll Be Waiting"	Tom Hanks	C. Gaby Mitchell	August 15, 1993
Eve Cressy (Marg Helgenberger) is a gangster's moll who awaits the return of her lover from prison. She meets hotel detective Tony Reseck (Bruno Kirby), whose attempt to protect her ends in violence. • Featured Song: Patti Page, "Why Don't You Love Me." • The episode was filmed at the Ambassador Hotel in Los Angeles, where in 1968 Robert F. Kennedy was assassinated the evening he won the California presidential Democratic Party primary. Original Source: Raymond Chandler (1888–1959), short story of the same name and published in The Saturday Evening Post, October 14, 1939
3	3	"The Quiet Room"	Steven Soderbergh	Howard A. Rodman	August 29, 1993
Streeter (Joe Mantegna) and brutal Creighton (Bonnie Bedelia) are corrupt cops of the Los Angeles Police Department whose antics lead to a tragic end when a shakedown plan goes awry. • Awards: One Emmy nomination — Bonnie Bedelia, Outstanding Guest Actress/Drama. Original Source: Jonathan Craig (pseudonym of Frank E. Smith [1919–1984]), short story of the same name published in Manhunt Magazine, December 1953
4	4	"The Frightening Frammis"	Tom Cruise	Jon Robin Baitz & Howard A. Rodman	September 5, 1993
Mitch Allison (Peter Gallagher) steals $25,000 from his con-artist wife Bette (Nancy Travis) and jumps on a train hoping to double the money in a gambling scam. • Awards: One CableACE Awards nomination — Isabella Rossellini, Outstanding Actress. Original Source: Jim Thompson (1906–1977), novelette of the same name and published in Alfred Hitchcock's Mystery Magazine, February 1957
5	5	"Murder Obliquely"	Alfonso Cuarón	Amanda Silver	September 19, 1993
Annie (Laura Dern) falls in love with a millionaire (Alan Rickman) who has another lover (Diane Lane) and is not afraid to show it. • Awards: One CableACE Award — Emmanuel Lubezki, Direction of Photography. One Emmy nomination, Laura Dern, Outstanding Guest Actress/Drama. • Featured Song: Billie Holiday, "Yesterdays." Original Source: Cornell Woolrich (1903–1968), novelette Violence, published in 1958 from Woolrich's short story "Death Escapes the Eye" published in Shadow Magazine April–May 1947
6	6	"Since I Don't Have You"	Jonathan Kaplan	Steven A. Katz	September 26, 1993
Fixer and bag-man Buzz Meeks (Gary Busey) is hired by two of his bosses: the multi-talented Howard Hughes (Tim Matheson) and the mafia gangster Mickey Cohen (James Woods). After investigating, Meeks discovers the woman whom they have both fallen crazy in love with. • Awards: Two CableACE Awards nominations — James Woods, Outstanding Actor; Gary Busey, Outstanding Actor. • Notes: James Ellroy said of this episode,"I thought Gary Busey was a bad Buzz Meeks, James Woods an ineffectual Mickey Cohen and Tim Matheson was great as Howard Hughes." Original Source: James Ellroy (1948– ), novelette of the same name published in the mystery and suspense anthology A Matter of Crime, edited by Bruccoli and Layman, and published in 1988; The story was later included in a noir anthology series Ellroy published named Hollywood Nocturne in 1994

=== Season 2 (1995) ===
No. overall	No. in season	Title	Directed by	Written by	Original release date
7	1	"Love and Blood"	Kiefer Sutherland	Frank Pugliese	October 8, 1995
A boxer's wife (Mädchen Amick) is unhappy with her marriage and leaves her husband Matt Cordell (Kiefer Sutherland) for another man. Later she wants to give the marriage another chance. Cordell is framed for a murder. • Awards: One CableACE Awards nomination, Frank Pugliese, Screenplay Original source: Evan Hunter, short story published in Manhunt Magazine, July 1954, as "Return".
8	2	"Professional Man"	Steven Soderbergh	Howard A. Rodman	October 15, 1995
Johnny Lamb (Brendan Fraser) has two jobs: he's an elevator operator by day and a hit man by night. His boss (Peter Coyote) sends him on a job that makes Lamb confront his conscience. • Awards: One CableACE Awards nomination — Steven Soderbergh, Directing a Drama Series. Original source: David Goodis (1917–1967), short story of the same name and published in Manhunt Magazine, October 1953
9	3	"A Dime a Dance"	Peter Bogdanovich	Allan Scott	October 22, 1995
A police detective (Eric Stoltz) investigates the untimely death of a nightclub dancer at a local hang-out but his investigation is called off by the police brass even though the killer is still on the loose. • Awards: One CableACE Awards nomination — Jennifer Grey, Actress in a Dramatic Special or Series. Original source: Cornell Woolrich (1903–1968), novelette The Dancing Detective and published in Black Mask Magazine, February 1938
10	4	"Good Housekeeping"	Michael Lehmann	Scott McGehee	October 29, 1995
The life of an ordinary housewife (Dana Delany) is transformed when she falls for a mafioso (Adam Baldwin). Original source: Bruno Fischer (1908–1992), novella No Escape! and published in Detective Tales, January 1949
11	5	"Tomorrow I Die"	John Dahl	Steven Katz	November 5, 1995
Hollywood actor Rich Thurber (Bill Pullman) gets off the bus and enters a bar to quench his thirst. The bar is taken over by tough bank thieves who mistake Thurber for a local politician. Original source: Mickey Spillane (1918–2006), short story "I'll Die Tomorrow" and published in Cavalier Magazine, March 1960
12	6	"The Black Bargain"	Keith Gordon	Don Macpherson	November 19, 1995
A mobster (Miguel Ferrer) is hiding out in a hotel room and one by one his friends, like Augie (Peter Berg), abandon him. Original source: Cornell Woolrich (1903–1968), story "The Night of February 17, 1924" published in Justice Magazine, January 1956. In 1958 the story was included in a collection of stories written by Woolrich titled Hotel Room
13	7	"Fly Paper"	Tim Hunter	Donald E. Westlake	Unaired
A wayward daughter of wealth (Kristin Minter), known to hang out in dives, has absconded with ex-con "Babe" McCloor (Michael Rooker). The Continental Op (Christopher Lloyd) is assigned by the Old Man (Darren McGavin) to assist her father in retrieving her. Original source: Dashiell Hammett (1894–1961), short story of the same name and published in Black Mask, August 1929. Hammett wrote a series of The Continental Op stories and novels.
14	8	"Red Wind"	Agnieska Holland	Alan Trustman	Unaired
Philip Marlowe (Danny Glover) investigates a series of murders. Original source: Raymond Chandler (1888–1959), novella of the same name and published in Dime Detective, January 1938
15	9	"Fearless"	Jim McBride	Richard Wesley	Unaired
In South Los Angeles, Fearless Jones (Bill Nunn) and Paris Minton (Giancarlo Esposito) try to help nightclub jazz singer Deletha (Cynda Williams) steal her singing contract from the nightclub manager. Original source: Walter Mosley (1952– ), novelette of the same name and published in the mystery and suspense anthology Spooks, Spies, and Private Eyes, edited by Paula L. Woods, 1995

== Reprints ==
Stories from the second season are reprinted in various volumes:

- "Flypaper" in The Big Knockover, and several Hammett collections.
- "Dancing Detective" in the Ibooks edition of Rear Window.
- "Professional Man" published in New Crimes, edited by Maxim Jakabowski.
- "No Escape!" published in As Tough as They Come, edited by Will Oursler.
- "Tomorrow I Die" in A Century of Noir.
- "Red Wind," in several Chandler collections.

== Reception ==
When it debuted, Fallen Angels received mixed to critical notices. In his review for the Associated Press, Scott Williams wrote, "We're asking a lot of TV to deliver entertainment about that stylish, moral abyss. Fallen Angels delivers. It lets us look over the edge and measure our souls against the darkness". The Chicago Sun-Times gave the series two out of four stars and Ginny Holbert wrote, "Part of the problem is the series' arch, self-conscious obsession with style. Instead of a '90s interpretation of film noir, Fallen Angels offers contrived, full-color cliche noir, replete with cocked fedoras, plumes of curling smoke and harsh sunlight sliced by venetian blinds". In his review for The New York Times, John J. O'Connor called it, "uneven but diverting, even when just hovering around film-school level". In his review for the Houston Chronicle, Louis B. Parks wrote, "The big problem with film noir homages is they usually overdo the ingredients, with none of the subtlety of the great originals. Fallen Angels has a touch of that. But the directors and actors play straight, and the adaptations, taken from the real McCoy writers, are pretty good stuff".

In his review for The Washington Post, Tom Shales wrote, "Creating period pieces out of their period seems to be fairly easy now for the gifted artisans of Hollywood. Even by today's commonplace high standards, however, the look and feel of the six Fallen Angels films seem transportingly authentic and sensuous, stylized in ways that evoke the milieu without spoofing it. Occasionally, the films veer into the arch and ridiculous, but overall, they at least look darn good". Newsweek magazine's David Gates wrote, "no show this summer will do a better job of whisking you away from the increasingly unacceptable '90s. These half hours are all too short". Entertainment Weekly magazine's Lisa Schwarzbaum wrote, "One unintended result of all this happy, naughty cigarette-puffing, however, is that, at their weakest, these films look like the work of boys (and don't be fooled, this is a boys' fantasy production) dressed up in their dads' big suits".

== Home media ==
In the United States the first season was released in a two volume VHS set. The second season was released in Europe (DVD region 2) in 1999 and Australia (DVD region 4) under the title Perfect Crimes. In France, Elephant Classic Films released the complete Fallen Angels series - all 15 episodes - as a 3-DVD [region 2] set.

== Other media ==
Grove Press released a companion book, Six Noir Tales Told for Television, (1993) with all the original stories and the screenplays from the first season. A soundtrack was also released.
