= Howard A. Rodman =

American novelist

- Occupations: Screenwriter; author; professor
- Known for: Savage Grace; August; Joe Gould's Secret; Destiny Express; The Great Eastern
- Spouse(s): Anne Friedberg (m. 1990; died 2009) Mary Beth Heffernan (m. 2017)

Howard A. Rodman is an American screenwriter, author and professor. He is the former President of the Writers Guild of America, West, professor emeritus and former chair of the writing division at the USC School of Cinematic Arts, alumnus of Telluride Association Summer Program and an artistic director of the Sundance Institute Screenwriting Labs.

He is the son of screenwriter Howard Rodman (1920–1985).

== Career ==
In his 20s and early 30s, Rodman was a typist, a legal proofreader, a mail-room clerk, a union organizer (for the Committee of Interns and Residents) and the guitarist for various lower-Manhattan post-punk bands (Made in USA, Arsenal, Soul Sharks).

Starting as editor-in-chief of The Cornell Daily Sun, Rodman has published scores of articles in venues including The New York Times, The Los Angeles Times, Los Angeles Magazine, and the Village Voice (for which he was a monthly columnist).

His adaptations of Jim Thompson, David Goodis et al. for Showtime's Fallen Angels anthology series were directed by Steven Soderbergh and Tom Cruise. The screenplays were published in Fallen Angels: Six Noir Tales Told for Television. Rodman then wrote Joe Gould's Secret, which opened the 2000 Sundance festival and was subsequently released by October/USA Films. Rodman's original screenplay F. was selected by Premiere Magazine as one of Hollywood's Ten Best Unproduced Screenplays. Other films include Savage Grace, starring Julianne Moore, and August, with Josh Hartnett, Rip Torn, and David Bowie—both of which had their US premieres at the 2008 Sundance Film Festival. They were released in 2008 from IFC and First Look, respectively. Rodman's screenplay for Savage Grace was nominated for a Spirit Award in the Best Screenplay category. In 2023 Rodman wrote on the HBO/Max series The Idol (TV series).

== Destiny Express ==
Destiny Express was published in January 1990 by Atheneum Books. It was blurbed by Thomas Pynchon, who called it "Daringly imagined and darkly romantic — a moral thriller."

Destiny Express is an historical romance. Set in Berlin in March 1933, it explores the stark choices faced by the German filmmaking community – chief among them legendary director Fritz Lang (M; Metropolis), and his acclaimed wife and collaborator, Thea von Harbou. Lang was famously offered the position of head of the Reich's film industry by Joseph Goebbels, and fled on the next train to Paris; von Harbou stayed, and made films for the Nazis. Destiny Express is thus the story of the end of a marriage, set in one of history's most crucial junctures. Other historical figures – Bertolt Brecht, Billy Wilder among them – play significant roles in the novel's intertwined narratives. The novel was reissued in paperback on May 19, 2026, from Rare Bird Books/Unnamed Press, distributed by Simon & Schuster.

== The Great Eastern ==
Rodman's novel The Great Eastern was published on June 4, 2019, by Melville House Publishing. In 2020, actor Keegan-Michael Key was quoted in The New York Times as saying of the book, "It's great. It's been my favorite read of the year so far."

Kirkus Reviews wrote, "On top of a seamless plot and rapid yet contemplative pace, Rodman’s prose is lyrical, technical, and all-engrossing. The journey of Ahab, Nemo, and Brunel already reads like a timeless classic, to be enjoyed by lovers of history and great literature. A historically fantastic adventure as mysterious and tumultuous as the sea itself."

In March 2019, the film rights to The Great Eastern were acquired by the UK film company Great Point Media, and Rodman was commissioned to write the screen adaptation.

As with Destiny Express, The Great Eastern was reissued in paperback on May 19, 2026, from Rare Bird Books/Unnamed Press, distributed by Simon & Schuster.

== Other works ==
Rodman's afterword to Jean-Patrick Manchette's No Room at the Morgue was published by New York Review Books in August 2020.

Rodman contributed a chapter to the graphic novel anthology Blondie: Against the Odds, using the Blondie song Atomic (song) as a way of telling the Lower East Side love story of Julius and Ethel Rosenberg.

== Reviews ==
- Kirkus Reviews, "The Great Eastern: A historically fantastic adventure as mysterious and tumultuous as the sea itself.
- Keegan-Michael Key (December 15, 2020). "Keegan-Michael Key Reaches into the Past With 'Midnight Run' and 'Electric Ladyland'". The New York Times.
- Brian Evenson (July 15, 2019). "Past and Pastiche in Howard A. Rodman's 'The Great Eastern'". Los Angeles Review of Books.
- Paul Burke (June 15, 2019). "'The Great Eastern' by Howard A. Rodman". NB Magazine. Archived from the original on October 18, 2021.
- Jay Gabler (July 17, 2019). "Howard Rodman's 'The Great Eastern' Pits Ahab Against Nemo". The Tangential.
- Deborah Mason (March 4, 1990). "Fate Calls for Fritz Lang". The New York Times Book Review.
- Ernest Callenbach (March 11, 1990). "The Great Escape That Never Was : DESTINY EXPRESS by Howard A. Rodman". Los Angeles Times.

== Filmography ==
- Fallen Angels (American TV series) (1993) (Episode "The Quiet Room")
- Fallen Angels (American TV series) (1993) (Episode "The Frightening Frammis")
- Fallen Angels (American TV series) (1995) (Episode "Professional Man")
- The Hunger (TV series) (1997) (Episode "The Swords")
- The Hunger (TV series) (1997) (Episode "No Radio") (Directed only)
- Joe Gould's Secret (2000)
- Track Down (2000)
- August (2007)
- Savage Grace (2007)
- The Idol (2023)(staff writer)

== Other activities ==
Rodman is a Governor and Vice President of the Academy of Motion Picture Arts and Sciences.

He founded and formerly chaired the Writers Guild Independent Writers Caucus. He has chaired FilmIndependent's Spirit Awards feature film jury as well as the USC Scripter Awards. He is past president of the USC chapter of the American Association of University Professors, a Fellow of the Los Angeles Institute for the Humanities; a former trustee of the Writers Guild Foundation, former vice-chair of the Committee on the Professional Status of Writers; and serves on several nonprofit boards, among them the Franco-American Cultural Fund, and, formerly, Cornell in Hollywood. He is an alumnus of the Seed Fund Board of the Liberty Hill Foundation, and a former editor of The Bill of Rights Journal. Rodman also served on Los Angeles committee of PEN America.

He is a member of the National Film Preservation Board, which advises Librarian of Congress on the annual selection of films to the National Film Registry. It also advises on national film preservation planning policy.

Rodman is a member of The Quill and Dagger Society, founded at Cornell University in 1893.

Working with the Library Foundation of Los Angeles, USC, and the Writers Guild, Rodman has conducted public conversations with such writers as Tom Wolfe, Ricky Jay, Jeannette Seaver, Vince Gilligan, Geoff Dyer, and Lady Antonia Fraser.

In November 2019, he was a member of the jury at the Cannes 1939 Film Festival in Orléans France.

Rodman also contributes to the Los Angeles Review of Books. His latest articles include 'After Hours Capitalism: On Tom Lutz's "Born Slippy"' a review of Tom Lutz’s "Born Slippy", published by Repeater Books and 'On the 192nd Anniversary of the Birth of Jules Verne'.

Rodman contributed to Black Clock literary magazine, published semi-annually by CalArts in association with its MFA Writing Program. Rodman's work was published in issues 4, 5, 10, 13, 19, 20, 21.

In June 2026 Rodman returned to his post-punk roots, playing in Glenn Branca's Symphony No. 13 for 100 Guitars (Hallucination City) at Geffen Hall, Lincoln Center.)

== Honors and awards ==
On October 31, 2013, Rodman was named a Chevalier de l'Ordre des Arts et des Lettres by the French Republic. In January 2023 he was promoted from Chevalier to Officier.

In February 2018 he was inducted into Final Draft (software)'s Screenwriters Hall of Fame, alongside Robert Towne, Steven Zaillian, Aaron Sorkin, Nancy Meyers, Paul Schrader, Lawrence Kasdan et al.

In February 2020 Rodman was presented with the USC Associates Award for Artistic Expression, "the highest honor the University bestows on its members for significant artistic impact," by USC Provost Charles Zukoski. In 2025 he was presented with the Walter Wolf Award by the USC Academic Senate, “bestowed on a USC faculty member for defense and advocacy of academic freedom or for other manifestations of social conscience, through distinguished faculty service, teaching, scholarship, or activity as a public intellectual.” Also in 2025, he was presented with the Ex Libris Award honoring his service to the USC Libraries, presented by Walter Mosley

In October 2026 Rodman was named Writer-in-Residence by the American Library in Paris.

== Personal life ==
He was married to the writer and media scholar Anne Friedberg, author of The Virtual Window. until her death in 2009; they have one son, Tristan Rodman. Their house, the 1957 John Lautner "Zahn Residence," has been widely published. Their work with Lautner in restoring it was chronicled in the February 2002 issue of Dwell magazine.

In June 2017, he wed the artist and professor Mary Beth Heffernan.

In November 2023, he spoke in solidarity against academic repression of Palestinian activism.
