= Mary Beth Heffernan (artist) =

American photographer and artist

Mary Beth Heffernan (born 1965) is a Los Angeles-based artist working in photography, sculpture, installation and social practice art. Her work focuses on the body and its relationship with images and language.

She is a professor at Occidental College in Los Angeles.

== Career ==
Mary Beth Heffernan was born in Worcester, Massachusetts in 1965. She graduated in 1987 from Boston University with a BFA, magna cum laude. She also has an MFA from the Photography Program at California Institute of the Arts.

She was a Fellow in the Studio program at the Whitney Independent Study Program 1994–95.

She is a fellow of the Los Angeles Institute for the Humanities.

Her artwork has been featured in the LA Times, Smithsonian Magazine, The New York Times, The Huffington Post, and Art Papers.

== PPE Portrait Project ==
The PPE Portrait project was created by Mary Beth Heffernan. It was started during the 2014–2015 Ebola outbreak as a way of helping patients deal with the trauma of not seeing their caregivers' faces. The project was revived by Cati Brown-Johnson from Stanford University School of Medicine for the COVID-19 pandemic.

Heffernan's social practice PPE Portrait project collaborated with the Liberian Ministry of Health and Social Welfare to humanize the patient-healthcare relationship in the 2014–16 Ebola epidemic. Supported by a Presidential Grant from the Arnold P. Gold Foundation, the PPE Portrait Project placed disposable adhesive portraits on the outside of healthcare worker's hazmat suits so that patients could see who was caring for them.

The PPE Portrait project received national and international recognition on NPR, PRI, the BBC, the Los Angeles Review of Books, MSNBC, and was featured in Tiffany Schlain's 2015 film The Adaptable Mind. The project was cited by the National Academies of Sciences-Engineering-Medicine as an exemplary integration of the arts and STEMM. The project was also reviewed in the LA Weekly and Hyperallergic.

In 2020, Heffernan adapted the PPE Portrait Project for the COVID-19 pandemic and was named an "inspiring force" in Los Angeles art in 2020 by Hyperallergic senior editor Elisa Wouk Almino. Heffernan collaborated to roll out the project at Stanford University, UMASS Memorial Medical Center, and the ICU Bridge Program of Canada. She supported scores of hospitals in the US and worldwide in adopting PPE Portraits, including Azienda Usl di Piacenza, Italy. and St. Marianna University Hospital in Tokyo.

Heffernan is collaborating with researchers to establish PPE Portraits as best practice for patients whose healthcare workers are masked, publishing in the Journal of General Internal Medicine and the Journal of Pain and Symptom Management.

== Permanent exhibitions ==
Heffernan's PPE Portrait Project is included in the 10 year exhibition "Being Human" at the Wellcome Collection in London.

== Previous exhibitions ==
The PPE Portrait Project was featured in the 2018 Royal College of Nursing exhibition, Pandemic.

BLUE, created by Mary Beth Heffernan was presented at Sloan Projects, Santa Monica, CA, September 12 – October 17, 2015. It was reviewed in the Los Angeles Times.

Light Work Gallery, Syracuse, NY. Also added to Collection.

Hammer Museum/Grunwald Center Collection (The Book of Lies, Volume II)

"Soldier's Skin" at the Pasadena City College Art Gallery

== Art grants ==
Heffernan's work has been supported by grants from Photographic Arts Council LA, the Arnold P. Gold Foundation, Durfee Foundation, and Light Work NY.

In 2010, Heffernan was awarded the City of Los Angeles (COLA) Master Artist Fellowship.

Heffernan was awarded the inaugural 2016–17 PAC/LA Contemporary Artist Grant as Artist-in-Residence at The Huntington Library.

== Personal life ==
In June 2017 Mary Beth Heffernan married screenwriter, author and professor Howard A. Rodman.
