= Ron Rifkin =

American actor

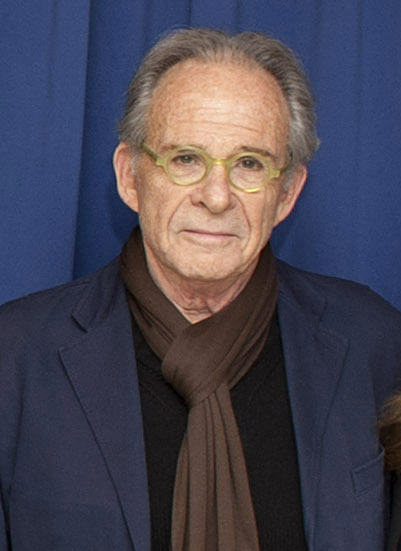
- Rifkin in 2014
- Born: Saul M. Rifkin; October 31, 1938 (age 88); New York City, U.S.
- Occupation: Actor
- Years active: 1966–present
- Spouse: Iva Rifkin (m. 1966; died 2023)

Ron Rifkin (born Saul M. Rifkin; October 31, 1938) is an American actor best known for his roles as Arvin Sloane on the spy drama Alias, Saul Holden on the drama Brothers & Sisters, and District Attorney Ellis Loew in L.A. Confidential. He received the Tony Award for Best Featured Actor in a Musical for his portrayal of Herr Schultz in the 1998 revival of Cabaret.

== Personal life ==
Saul M. Rifkin was born in New York City in 1938 to Miriam and Herman Rifkin, who was born in Russia. He is the oldest of three children. He was raised as an Orthodox Jew and remains Jewish, though he left Orthodoxy at age 32.

His wife, Iva March Rifkin, owned a fashion design business. She died in 2023.

== Career ==
In 2001, Rifkin's association with Touchstone Television began when he played intelligence agent Arvin Sloane in Alias, opposite Jennifer Garner. From 2006 to 2011, he played second-in-command businessman Saul Holden on Brothers & Sisters, opposite Sally Field as his sister Nora Walker. He also played Ann Romano-Royer (Bonnie Franklin)'s boyfriend Nick on One Day at a Time. He was a series regular during the sixth season. In the season 7 premiere, "Alex Moves In", it was revealed that Nick had been killed as a result of an accident with a drunk driver.

Rifkin has enjoyed a long and distinguished career in film, on stage, and in television. His association with writer Jon Robin Baitz has been especially fruitful. In 1991, his performance in Baitz's play The Substance of Fire won him the Obie, Drama Desk, Lucille Lortel, and Drama-Logue awards for Best Actor. The next year, he performed in Baitz's Three Hotels, for which he received a second Lucille Lortel and Drama Desk nomination. In 1996, he starred in the film version of Substance; in 2002, he appeared in the Baitz play Ten Unknowns at Boston's Huntington Theatre. In 2004, he starred in his play The Paris Letter at the Kirk Douglas Theatre in Los Angeles, a role he reprised in 2005 at the Laura Pels Theatre in New York City. Rifkin also appeared in the ABC drama series Brothers & Sisters, which Baitz created.

Rifkin received a 1998 Tony Award for Best Featured Actor in a Musical for the Broadway revival of Cabaret. Additional theatre credits include David Hirson's Wrong Mountain, Arthur Miller's Broken Glass, Ivan Turgenev's A Month in the Country, and Neil Simon's Proposals.

Rifkin's extensive film credits include Silent Running (1972), The Sunshine Boys (1975), The Big Fix (1978), JFK (1991), Husbands and Wives (1992), Manhattan Murder Mystery (1993), Wolf (1994), L.A. Confidential (1997), The Negotiator (1998), Boiler Room (2000), Keeping the Faith (2000), The Majestic (2001), Dragonfly (2002), The Sum of All Fears (2002), and Pulse (2006).

On television, he has appeared in numerous made-for-TV movies and miniseries, had regular roles on The Rockford Files, One Day at a Time, Husbands, Wives & Lovers, The Trials of Rosie O'Neill, and Alias, and made guest appearances on a number of series, including Barnaby Jones, The Mary Tyler Moore Show, Sex and the City, The Bob Newhart Show, The Good Wife, ER, Law & Order, A Nero Wolfe Mystery, Falcon Crest, Soap, Hill Street Blues, Smash, and The Outer Limits, for which he received a CableACE nomination. Most recently, he appeared in Limitless as Brian Finch's father Dennis Finch and in Gotham as Father Creel. He has recorded several audiobooks, including Lois Lowry's The Giver, Phyllis Reynolds Naylor's Sang Spell, and Jerry Spinelli's Milkweed. He portrays Defense Attorney Marvin Stan Exely, a recurring character on Law & Order: Special Victims Unit.

In October 2020, a short film, Daddy, was uploaded on Christian Coppola's YouTube channel in which Rifkin stars alongside Dylan Sprouse. In the film, "after the death of his wife, an 80-year-old man checks into The Plaza Hotel to celebrate their first anniversary apart, hiring a male escort to take her place."

== Filmography ==
=== Film ===
| Year | Title | Role | Notes |
|---|---|---|---|
| 1969 | The Devil's 8 | Stewart Martin | |
| 1969 | Flareup | Sailor | |
| 1972 | Silent Running | Marty Barker | |
| 1972 | Fuzz | Cop guarding the Mayor's Mansion | Uncredited |
| 1975 | The Sunshine Boys | TV floor manager | |
| 1978 | Rabbit Test | Dr. Briscoe | |
| 1978 | The Big Fix | Randy | |
| 1981 | The Chosen | Baseball Coach | |
| 1983 | The Sting II | Eddie | |
| 1984 | Kidco | George Tuskie | |
| 1991 | JFK | Mr. Goldberg/Spiesel | |
| 1992 | Husbands and Wives | Rain's Analyst | |
| 1993 | Manhattan Murder Mystery | Sy | |
| 1994 | Wolf | Doctor Ralph | |
| 1995 | Last Summer in the Hamptons | Eli Garfield | |
| 1996 | The Substance of Fire | Isaac Geldhart | |
| 1996 | I'm Not Rappaport | Feigelbaum | |
| 1997 | L.A. Confidential | District Attorney Ellis Loew | |
| 1998 | The Negotiator | Commander Grant Frost | |
| 2000 | Drop Back Ten | | |
| 2000 | Boiler Room | Judge Marty Davis | |
| 2000 | Keeping the Faith | Larry Friedman | |
| 2001 | Sam the Man | Richard | |
| 2001 | The Majestic | Kevin Bannerman - Peter's Attorney | |
| 2002 | Tadpole | Professor Tisch | |
| 2002 | Dragonfly | Charlie Dickinson | |
| 2002 | The Sum of All Fears | Secretary of State Sidney Owens | |
| 2002 | Just a Kiss | Dr. Fauci | |
| 2006 | Pulse | Dr. Waterson | |
| 2010 | Peep World | Henry Meyerwitz | |
| 2012 | The Words | Timothy Epstein | |
| 2016 | True Memoirs of an International Assassin | Amos AKA The Ghost | |
| 2017 | They Shall Not Perish | Henry Morgenthau Sr. | |
| 2018 | A Star Is Born | Carl | |
| 2018 | Daddy | Mr. Smith | Short film |
| 2020 | Minyan | Josef | |
| 2022 | Funny Pages | Grandpa | |

=== Television ===
| Year | Title | Role | Notes |
|---|---|---|---|
| 1966 | Gidget | Mel | Episode: "Love and the Single Gidget" |
| 1970 | Room 222 | Ralph Fisk | Episode: "Ralph" |
| 1970 | The Interns | Ferguson | Episode: "Mondays Can Be Fatal" |
| 1972 | Awake and Sing! | Sam Feinschreiber | TV movie |
| 1972 | The Sandy Duncan Show | Warren | Episode: "Doctor New" |
| 1972 | Young Dr. Kildare | Harry Flicker | Episode: "No More Than a Bad Cold" |
| 1973 | Bachelor-at-Law | Assistant District Attorney | TV movie |
| 1973 | Adam's Rib | Asst. Dist. Atty. Roy Mendelsohn | 13 episodes |
| 1973 | Insight | John Bailey | Episode: "Reunion" |
| 1974 | Get Christie Love! | Normand | Episode: "Get Christie Love!" |
| 1974 | The Bob Newhart Show | Jeff Boggs | Episode: "Mind Your Own Business" |
| 1974 | Owen Marshall, Counselor at Law | Marty Dyer | Episode: "To Keep and Bear Arms" |
| 1974 | The Suicide Club | | TV movie |
| 1974 | The Mary Tyler Moore Show | Ed Schroeder | Episode: "A New Sue Ann" |
| 1974 | The ABC Afternoon Playbreak | Tony | Episode: "Oh, Baby, Baby, Baby..." |
| 1975 | The Dream Makers | Herb | TV movie |
| 1975 | Barnaby Jones | Snipper Wilcox | Episode: "Counterfall" |
| 1975 | Cannon | Paul Goldberg | Episode: "The Deadly Conspiracy: Part 1" |
| 1975 | The Night That Panicked America | Mercury Theatre Player | TV movie |
| 1975 | Kojak | Rick Levene | Episode: "No Immunity for Murder" |
| 1975 | When Things Were Rotten | Prince John | 9 episodes |
| 1975–1976 | The Rockford Files | Tom Robertson / Warren Weeks | 2 episodes |
| 1976 | Doc | Gary | Episode: "A Little Bit of Soap" |
| 1976 | Medical Center | Danny Armbruster | Episode: "Life, Death and Mrs. Armbruster" |
| 1977 | In the Glitter Palace | Roger | TV movie |
| 1977 | McMillan & Wife | Aaron Leacock | Episode: "Have You Heard About Vanessa?" |
| 1977 | Husbands and Wives | Ron Cutler | TV movie |
| 1977 | Family | Dr. Grant | Episode: "Acts of Love: Part 2" |
| 1977 | The Tony Randall Show | Benten | Episode: "Walter Screws Up" |
| 1977 | Rafferty | Dr. Bakersmith | Episode: "Walking Wounded" |
| 1978 | A Question of Guilt | Assistant District Attorney Verrell | TV movie |
| 1978 | Columbo | Luther | Episode: "Make Me a Perfect Murder" |
| 1978 | Husbands, Wives & Lovers | Ron Willis | 10 episodes |
| 1978 | Soap | Dr. Kanter | 3 episodes |
| 1978 | Greatest Heroes of the Bible | Beseleel | 4 episodes |
| 1979 | Alice | Eric | Episode: "Sweet Charity" |
| 1979 | The Mary Tyler Moore Hour | Artie Miller | 11 episodes |
| 1979 | Mrs. R's Daughter | Joseph Barron | TV movie |
| 1979 | Salvage 1 | Reporter Mike Flannery | Episode: "Diamond Volcano" |
| 1980 | Knots Landing | Stan Lesser | 2 episodes |
| 1980–1981 | One Day at a Time | Nick Handris | 16 episodes |
| 1982 | The Day the Bubble Burst | | TV movie |
| 1983 | Another Woman's Child | Barry Stein | TV movie |
| 1983 | The Winds of War | Mark Hartley | Episode: "The Storm Breaks" |
| 1983 | Ryan's Four | | Episode: "Ryan's Four" |
| 1983 | Faerie Tale Theatre | The Squire | Episode: "Sleeping Beauty" |
| 1983 | Falcon Crest | Dr. Hal Lantry | 9 episodes |
| 1984 | Hill Street Blues | Monty DiMair | Episode: "Ratman and Bobbin" |
| 1984 | The Ratings Game | TV Director | TV movie |
| 1984–1991 | American Playhouse | Leonard / Samuel Roth | 2 episodes |
| 1985 | Evergreen | Solly | Episode #1.1 |
| 1985 | Do You Remember Love | Gerry Kaplan | TV movie |
| 1986 | The Greatest Adventure: Stories from the Bible | Mordecai (voice) | Episode: "Queen Esther" |
| 1986 | Dress Gray | Maj. Consor | 2 episodes |
| 1987 | Conspiracy: The Trial of the Chicago 8 | Allen Ginsberg | TV movie |
| 1990 | Three Hotels | | TV movie |
| 1990–1992 | The Trials of Rosie O'Neill | Ben Meyer | 34 episodes |
| 1990–1992 | Law & Order | Alex Drakos / Defense Attorney Phillip Nevins | 2 episodes |
| 1992 | ScreenPlay | Teddy Weinfeld | Episode: "Buying a Landslide" |
| 1993 | Room for Two | Jack Weissman | 3 episodes |
| 1994 | WSH: The Myth of the Urban Myth | Professor Pulling | TV movie |
| 1995 | Fallen Angels | Frank Barsaly | Episode: "Red Wind" |
| 1995–1996 | ER | Dr. Carl Vucelich | 9 episodes |
| 1996 | Norma Jean & Marilyn | Johnny Hyde | TV movie |
| 1997 | Leaving L.A. | Dr. Neil Bernstein | 6 episodes |
| 1997–1998 | The Outer Limits | Dr. Martin Nodel | 2 episodes |
| 2000 | Flowers for Algernon | Dr. Jonah Strauss | TV movie |
| 2000 | Deliberate Intent | Howard Siegel | TV movie |
| 2001 | The Warden | Judge Faschbinder | TV movie |
| 2001 | A Nero Wolfe Mystery | Nikola Miltan / Attorney Perry Helmar | 3 episodes |
| 2001–2006 | Alias | Arvin Sloane | 103 episodes |
| 2002 | Sex and the City | Julian Fisher | Episode: "A 'Vogue' Idea" |
| 2006–2011 | Brothers & Sisters | Saul Holden | 95 episodes |
| 2009 | American Masters | Narrator | Episode: "Jerome Robbins: Something to Dance About" |
| 2011–2014 | Law & Order: Special Victims Unit | Defense Attorney Marvin Exley | 6 episodes |
| 2013 | Touch | Isaac | Episode: "Leviathan" |
| 2013 | Smash | Himself | Episode: "The Tonys" |
| 2014 | Mind Games | Ted Sanders | Episode: "Pilot" |
| 2015 | The Good Wife | Spencer Randolph | Episode: "Winning Ugly" |
| 2015–2016 | Gotham | Father Creal | 5 episodes |
| 2015–2016 | Limitless | Dennis Finch | 12 episodes |
| 2016 | Elementary | Wayne Vachs | Episode: "Worth Several Cities" |
| 2018 | Blindspot | Rob Donnelly | Episode: "Deductions" |
| 2018–2019 | New Amsterdam | Dean Peter Fulton | 7 episodes |
