= The Panic in Central Park =

- Girls episode
- Marnie and Charlie ride home on the subway after capsizing in Central Park.
- Episode no.: Season 5 Episode 6
- Directed by: Richard Shepard
- Written by: Lena Dunham
- Cinematography by: Tim Ives
- Original air date: March 27, 2016

Guest appearances
- Christopher Abbott as Charlie Dattolo; Julia Garner as Charlie's roommate; Frank Wood as Charlie's client; Lane Moore as Salesperson

Episode chronology
← Previous "Queen for Two Days"	Next → "Hello Kitty"

"The Panic in Central Park" is the sixth episode of the fifth season of the American television comedy drama series Girls. It was written by Lena Dunham, and directed by Richard Shepard. It aired on the HBO channel in the United States on March 27, 2016.

The episode focuses on Marnie (Allison Williams) having a chance encounter with her ex-boyfriend Charlie (Christopher Abbott) after fighting with her husband Desi (Ebon Moss-Bachrach). This episode is the first in which Dunham has no dialogue, with her character only appearing in the final shot.

The episode received critical acclaim upon release, and is frequently ranked as one of the best episodes of Girls.

== Summary ==
Following a fight with Desi, Marnie sets off on her own in Bushwick to clear her head.

While walking, she notices Charlie, who she has not seen in two years, standing with a group of men. He is now bearded, more muscular, and has developed a heavy Brooklynite accent. She reprimands him for having left her in such an abrupt fashion, to which Charlie reveals that he had ended their relationship earlier due to the suicide of his father, which put him in an extremely volatile state.

Charlie invites Marnie to a party. The two go to a vintage clothing store and pick out a sparkling red party dress before heading uptown to the Plaza Hotel. Marnie quickly deduces that the only reason Charlie has been invited is to sell drugs to his client. While waiting at the bar for Charlie to finish the deal, Marnie seduces a wealthy businessman by pretending to be a prostitute, only to leave the hotel upon Charlie's return. The two share an expensive dinner, paid with cash from the businessman, before venturing into Central Park. There, they steal a row-boat before capsizing in the shallow water.

Soaking wet, the two take the subway back to Charlie's apartment. Before they can enter, the pair are robbed at gunpoint, forcing Marnie to give up her wedding ring among other items. Inside the apartment, Charlie proposes that they run away and start a new life together, and the two have sex.

The next morning Marnie discovers a heroin kit inside the pocket of Charlie's jeans, and walks back home in her dress barefoot. There, she finds Desi sitting on the steps of their building. Marnie asks to end the relationship, citing her lack of self-knowledge and general relationship struggles, which Desi accepts. Marnie then leaves to Hannah's apartment and falls asleep in her bed.

== Production ==
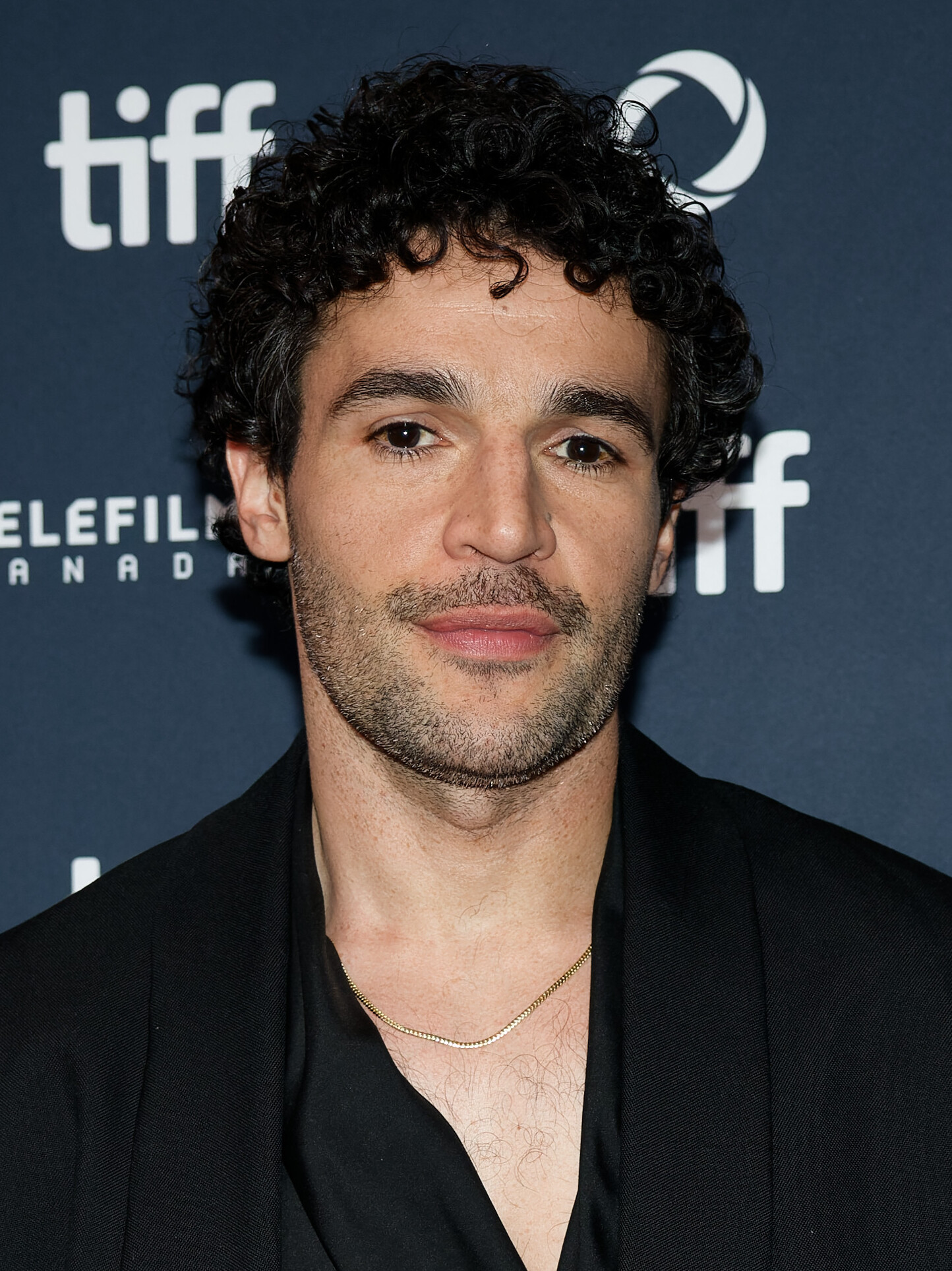
Abbott had previously left the series after season 2, stating that he "no longer related to the character" of Charlie.

Abbott, who had previously departed the series in 2013, ran into showrunner Jenni Konner at The Bowery Hotel where she pitched him the idea. Shepard, who had previously directed bottle episodes "One Man's Trash" and later "American Bitch", decided to shoot the episode handheld in order to capture the energy of exploring the city. Many of scenes shot near the Plaza hotel included real people unaware of the production.

Marnie's dress was subject to intense deliberation. Described as a Bob Mackie design in Dunham's script, multiple duplicates of the dress were handmade by costume designer Jenn Rogien due to the damage it experiences throughout the episode. Williams revealed that she still owns one of the alternates in her personal collection. For the scenes where Williams had to walk barefoot, moleskin patches were applied to the bottom of her feet.

The scene where Marnie and Charlie steal a boat was filmed in Staten Island, rather than Central Park, due to health concerns associated with filming in the water.

== Critical reception ==
The episode received critical acclaim, with Stephanie Bai of The Atlantic describing it as a "perfect episode of tv". Joe Matar, in a five star review for Den of Geek, praised the "dreamlike quality" to the episode, and described it more as a short film than an episode of television. Writing for The Young Folks, Caryn Welby-Solomon applauded Marnie's decision to leave a toxic relationship, citing friends who remained with their partners as a means of keeping up a self constructed image, and described William's performance as perfect for depicting Marnie's journey of self discovery.

== Cultural references ==
- The title of the episode is a riff on the 1971 film The Panic in Needle Park, which concerns the relationship between two heroin addicts in New York City.

== See also ==
- List of Girls episodes
- "American Bitch"
