= List of awards and nominations received by Girls =

List of awards and nominations for Girls
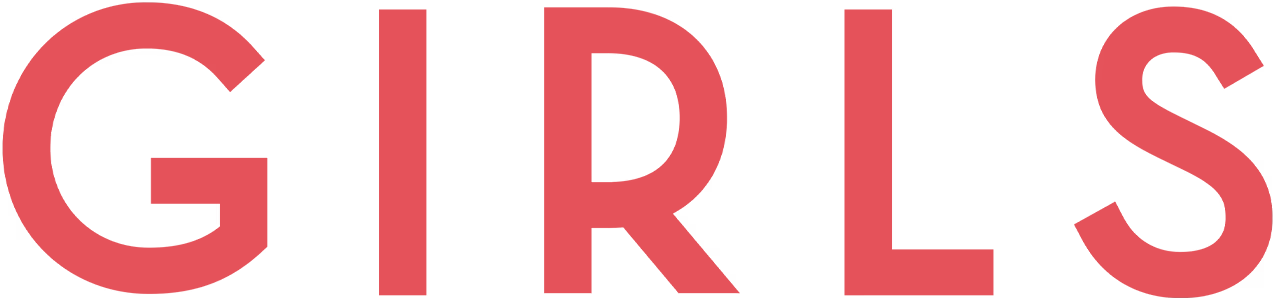
Awards and nominations
Award	Wins	Nominations
ACE Eddie Awards	0	1
ADG Excellence in Production Design Awards	1	1
AFI Awards	1	1
American Comedy Awards	0	1
Artios Awards	3	6
ASTRA Awards	0	1
British Academy Television Awards	1	1
Costume Designers Guild Awards	0	1
Critics' Choice Awards	0	11
Directors Guild of America Awards	1	1
Dorian Awards	2	3
Golden Globe Awards	2	6
Gracie Awards	1	1
Guild of Music Supervisors Awards	1	9
New Media Film Festival	0	1
Peabody Awards	1	1
People's Choice Awards	0	1
Primetime Emmy Awards	2	19
Robert Awards	0	1
Satellite Awards	0	3
TCA Awards	0	3
TV Guide Awards	0	3
Writers Guild of America Awards	1	2
Young Hollywood Awards	0	1

Totals (Note: Certain award groups do not simply award one winner. They acknowledge several different recipients, have runners-up, and have third place. Since this is a specific recognition and is different from losing an award, runner-up mentions are considered wins in this award tally. For simplification and to avoid errors, each award in this list has been presumed to have had a prior nomination.)
- Wins: 17
- Nominations: 79

Girls is an American comedy drama television series created, written, directed by, and starring Lena Dunham. The series has aired for six seasons on the cable channel HBO from April 15, 2012, to April 16, 2017.

Since its debut, the series has been nominated for a variety of different awards, including nineteen Primetime Emmy Awards (two wins for the series), six Golden Globe Awards (two wins for the series), three TCA Awards and two Writers Guild of America Awards (one win for the series). The series also won a BAFTA Award, a Directors Guild of America Award and a Peabody Award.

Dunham has been nominated for nineteen individual awards for her role as the series lead, as writer, and as producer. Several of Dunham's collaborators have also been nominated for various awards including co-stars Allison Williams and Adam Driver as well as recurring guest stars Becky Ann Baker, Peter Scolari, Andrew Rannells, Patrick Wilson, Gaby Hoffmann, Riz Ahmed and Matthew Rhys.

== Awards and nominations ==
Awards and nominations received by Girls
Award	Year (Note: The listed year refers to the date of the ceremony, not necessarily the year in which the corresponding season or episode aired.)	Category	Nominee(s)	Result	Ref.
ACE Eddie Awards	2013	Best Edited Half-Hour Series for Television	Robert Frazen, Catherine Haight (for "Pilot")	Nominated	
ADG Excellence in Production Design Awards	2013	Excellence in Production Design for a Half Hour Single-Camera Television Series	Judy Becker, Heather Loeffler, Laura Ballinger, Patricia Sprott	Won	
AFI Awards	2012	Program of the Year	Girls	Won	
American Comedy Awards	2014	Best Comedy Actress – TV	Lena Dunham	Nominated	
Artios Awards	2012	Outstanding Achievement in Casting – Television Pilot – Comedy	Jennifer Euston	Won	
Artios Awards	2012	Outstanding Achievement in Casting – Television Series – Comedy	Jennifer Euston	Won	
Artios Awards	2013	Outstanding Achievement in Casting – Television Series – Comedy	Jennifer Euston	Won	
Artios Awards	2015	Outstanding Achievement in Casting – Television Series – Comedy	Jennifer Euston	Nominated	
Artios Awards	2017	Outstanding Achievement in Casting – Television Series – Comedy	Jennifer Euston, Emer O’Callaghan	Nominated	
Artios Awards	2018	Outstanding Achievement in Casting – Television Series – Comedy	Jennifer Euston	Nominated	
ASTRA Awards	2013	Favourite Program – International Drama	Girls	Nominated	
British Academy Television Awards	2013	Best International Programme	Girls (Note: Nominees: Lena Dunham, Judd Apatow, Jenni Konner)	Won	
Costume Designers Guild Awards	2013	Excellence in Costume Design for a Contemporary Television Series	Jennifer Rogien	Nominated	
Critics' Choice Awards	2012	Best Comedy Series	Girls	Nominated	
Critics' Choice Awards	2012	Best Actress in a Comedy Series	Lena Dunham	Nominated	
Critics' Choice Awards	2012	Best Guest Performer in a Comedy Series	Becky Ann Baker	Nominated	
Critics' Choice Awards	2012	Best Guest Performer in a Comedy Series	Peter Scolari	Nominated	
Critics' Choice Awards	2013	Best Actress in a Comedy Series	Lena Dunham	Nominated	
Critics' Choice Awards	2013	Best Supporting Actor in a Comedy Series	Alex Karpovsky	Nominated	
Critics' Choice Awards	2013	Best Guest Performer in a Comedy Series	Patrick Wilson	Nominated	
Critics' Choice Awards	2014	Best Guest Performer in a Comedy Series	Andrew Rannells	Nominated	
Critics' Choice Awards	2015	Best Supporting Actor in a Comedy Series	Adam Driver	Nominated	
Critics' Choice Awards	2015	Best Guest Performer in a Comedy Series	Becky Ann Baker	Nominated	
Critics' Choice Awards	2016	Best Supporting Actress in a Comedy Series	Allison Williams	Nominated	
Directors Guild of America Awards	2013	Outstanding Directorial Achievement in Comedy Series	Lena Dunham (Note: Additional nominees: Regina Heyman (unit production manager); Ilene S. Landress (unit production manager); Mark McGann (first assistant director); Jason Ivey (second assistant director); Marcos Gonzalez Palma (second second assistant director)) (for "Pilot")	Won	
Dorian Awards	2013	TV Comedy of the Year	Girls	Won	
Dorian Awards	2013	TV Performance of the Year – Actress	Lena Dunham	Nominated	
Dorian Awards	2014	TV Comedy of the Year	Girls	Won	
Golden Globe Awards	2013	Best Television Series – Musical or Comedy	Girls	Won	
Golden Globe Awards	2013	Best Performance by an Actress in a Television Series – Musical or Comedy	Lena Dunham	Won	
Golden Globe Awards	2014	Best Television Series – Musical or Comedy	Girls	Nominated	
Golden Globe Awards	2014	Best Performance by an Actress in a Television Series – Musical or Comedy	Lena Dunham	Nominated	
Golden Globe Awards	2015	Best Television Series – Musical or Comedy	Girls	Nominated	
Golden Globe Awards	2015	Best Performance by an Actress in a Television Series – Musical or Comedy	Lena Dunham	Nominated	
Gracie Awards	2013	Outstanding Director – Entertainment	Lena Dunham	Won	
Guild of Music Supervisors Awards	2013	Best Music Supervision in a Television Musical or Comedy	Manish Raval, Tom Wolfe	Won	
Guild of Music Supervisors Awards	2014	Best Music Supervision in a Television Musical or Comedy	Manish Raval, Tom Wolfe	Nominated	
Guild of Music Supervisors Awards	2015	Best Music Supervision in a Television Musical or Comedy	Manish Raval, Tom Wolfe	Nominated	
Guild of Music Supervisors Awards	2016	Best Music Supervision in a Television Musical or Comedy	Manish Raval, Tom Wolfe, Jonathan Leahy	Nominated	
Guild of Music Supervisors Awards	2016	Best Song Written and/or Recorded for Television	Michael Penn, Allison Williams, Manish Raval, Tom Wolfe, Jonathan Leahy (for "Riverside")	Nominated	
Guild of Music Supervisors Awards	2017	Best Music Supervision in a Television Musical or Comedy	Manish Raval, Tom Wolfe, Jonathan Leahy	Nominated	
Guild of Music Supervisors Awards	2017	Best Song Written and/or Recorded for Television	David Bowie, AURORA, Manish Raval, Tom Wolfe, Jonathan Leahy (for "Life on Mars")	Nominated	
Guild of Music Supervisors Awards	2018	Best Music Supervision in a Television Musical or Comedy	Manish Raval, Tom Wolfe, Jonathan Leahy	Nominated	
Guild of Music Supervisors Awards	2018	Best Song Written and/or Recorded for Television	Julia Michaels, Jack Antonoff, Manish Raval, Tom Wolfe, Jonathan Leahy (for "How Do We Get Back to Love")	Nominated	
New Media Film Festival	2015	Festival Award	Girls	Nominated	
Peabody Awards	2012	Honoree (Note: Presented to Apatow Productions and I Am Jenni Konner Productions in association with HBO Entertainment)		Honored	
People's Choice Awards	2014	Favorite Premium Cable TV Show	Girls	Nominated	
Primetime Emmy Awards	2012	Outstanding Comedy Series	Girls (Note: Nominees: Lena Dunham, Judd Apatow, Jenni Konner, Ilene S. Landress, Bruce Eric Kaplan)	Nominated	
Primetime Emmy Awards	2012	Outstanding Lead Actress in a Comedy Series	Lena Dunham (for "She Did")	Nominated	
Primetime Emmy Awards	2012	Outstanding Directing for a Comedy Series	Lena Dunham (for "She Did")	Nominated	
Primetime Emmy Awards	2012	Outstanding Writing for a Comedy Series	Lena Dunham (for "Pilot")	Nominated	
Primetime Emmy Awards	2013	Outstanding Comedy Series	Girls	Nominated	
Primetime Emmy Awards	2013	Outstanding Lead Actress in a Comedy Series	Lena Dunham (for "Bad Friend")	Nominated	
Primetime Emmy Awards	2013	Outstanding Supporting Actor in a Comedy Series	Adam Driver (for "It's Back")	Nominated	
Primetime Emmy Awards	2013	Outstanding Directing for a Comedy Series	Lena Dunham (for "On All Fours")	Nominated	
Primetime Emmy Awards	2014	Outstanding Lead Actress in a Comedy Series	Lena Dunham (for "Beach House")	Nominated	
Primetime Emmy Awards	2014	Outstanding Supporting Actor in a Comedy Series	Adam Driver (for "Two Plane Rides")	Nominated	
Primetime Emmy Awards	2015	Outstanding Supporting Actor in a Comedy Series	Adam Driver (for "Close-Up")	Nominated	
Primetime Creative Arts Emmy Awards	2012	Outstanding Casting for a Comedy Series	Jennifer Euston	Won	
Primetime Creative Arts Emmy Awards	2013	Outstanding Casting for a Comedy Series	Jennifer Euston	Nominated	
Primetime Creative Arts Emmy Awards	2015	Outstanding Guest Actress in a Comedy Series	Gaby Hoffmann (for "Home Birth")	Nominated	
Primetime Creative Arts Emmy Awards	2016	Outstanding Guest Actor in a Comedy Series	Peter Scolari (for "Good Man")	Won	
Primetime Creative Arts Emmy Awards	2017	Outstanding Guest Actor in a Comedy Series	Riz Ahmed (for "All I Ever Wanted")	Nominated	
Primetime Creative Arts Emmy Awards	2017	Outstanding Guest Actor in a Comedy Series	Matthew Rhys (for "American Bitch")	Nominated	
Primetime Creative Arts Emmy Awards	2017	Outstanding Guest Actress in a Comedy Series	Becky Ann Baker (for "Gummies")	Nominated	
Primetime Creative Arts Emmy Awards	2017	Outstanding Music Supervision	Manish Raval, Tom Wolfe, Jonathan Leahy (for "Goodbye Tour")	Nominated	
Robert Awards	2013	Best Foreign TV Series	Girls	Nominated	
Satellite Awards	2012	Best Television Series, Musical or Comedy	Girls	Nominated	
Satellite Awards	2012	Best Actress in a Series, Musical or Comedy	Lena Dunham	Nominated	
Satellite Awards	2013	Best Actress in a Series, Musical or Comedy	Lena Dunham	Nominated	
TCA Awards	2012	Outstanding New Program	Girls	Nominated	
TCA Awards	2012	Individual Achievement in Comedy	Lena Dunham	Nominated	
TCA Awards	2013	Individual Achievement in Comedy	Lena Dunham	Nominated	
TV Guide Awards	2013	Favorite Comedy Series	Girls	Nominated	
TV Guide Awards	2013	Favorite Actress	Lena Dunham	Nominated	
TV Guide Awards	2013	Favorite Ensemble	Girls	Nominated	
Writers Guild of America Awards	2013	Television: New Series	Judd Apatow, Lesley Arfin, Lena Dunham, Sarah Heyward, Bruce Eric Kaplan, Jenni Konner, Deborah Schoeneman, Dan Sterling	Won	
Writers Guild of America Awards	2013	Television: Comedy Series	Judd Apatow, Lesley Arfin, Lena Dunham, Sarah Heyward, Bruce Eric Kaplan, Jenni Konner, Deborah Schoeneman, Dan Sterling	Nominated	
Young Hollywood Awards	2014	Best Cast Chemistry – TV	Girls	Nominated	
