= List of Girls episodes =

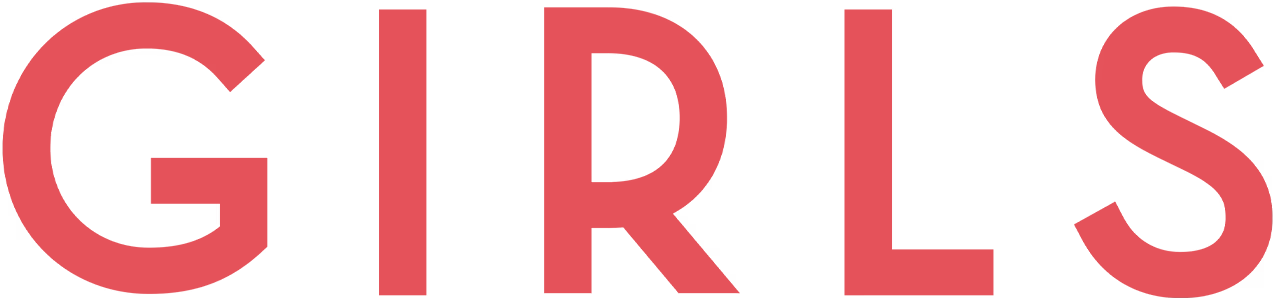

Girls is an American comedy-drama television series created by Lena Dunham, who serves as executive producer along with Judd Apatow and Jenni Konner. The series premiered on HBO on April 15, 2012. Girls stars Dunham as Hannah Horvath, an aspiring writer in her 20s trying to navigate her personal and professional life in New York City after her parents discontinue their financial support. Allison Williams, Jemima Kirke, Zosia Mamet, Adam Driver, and Alex Karpovsky co-star as Hannah's circle of friends, who are also trying to figure out their own lives and relationships. During the course of the series, 62 episodes of Girls aired over six seasons, between April 15, 2012, and April 16, 2017.

== Series overview ==
Season	Episodes	Originally released	
Season	Episodes	First released	Last released
1	10	April 15, 2012	June 17, 2012
2	10	January 13, 2013	March 17, 2013
3	12	January 12, 2014	March 23, 2014
4	10	January 11, 2015	March 22, 2015
5	10	February 21, 2016	April 17, 2016
6	10	February 12, 2017	April 16, 2017

== Episodes ==
=== Season 1 (2012) ===
No. overall	No. in season	Title	Directed by	Written by	Original release date	US viewers (millions)
1	1	"Pilot"	Lena Dunham	Lena Dunham	April 15, 2012	0.872
2	2	"Vagina Panic"	Lena Dunham	Lena Dunham	April 22, 2012	0.858
3	3	"All Adventurous Women Do"	Lena Dunham	Lena Dunham	April 29, 2012	0.816
4	4	"Hannah's Diary"	Richard Shepard	Lena Dunham	May 6, 2012	0.743
5	5	"Hard Being Easy"	Jesse Peretz	Lena Dunham	May 13, 2012	0.830
6	6	"The Return"	Lena Dunham	Lena Dunham & Judd Apatow	May 20, 2012	0.678
7	7	"Welcome to Bushwick a.k.a. The Crackcident"	Jody Lee Lipes	Lena Dunham & Jenni Konner	May 27, 2012	0.868
8	8	"Weirdos Need Girlfriends Too"	Jody Lee Lipes	Lena Dunham & Dan Sterling	June 3, 2012	1.094
9	9	"Leave Me Alone"	Richard Shepard	Lena Dunham & Bruce Eric Kaplan	June 10, 2012	0.866
10	10	"She Did"	Lena Dunham	Lena Dunham	June 17, 2012	1.004

=== Season 2 (2013) ===
No. overall	No. in season	Title	Directed by	Written by	Original release date	US viewers (millions)
11	1	"It's About Time"	Lena Dunham	Lena Dunham & Jenni Konner	January 13, 2013	0.866
Several weeks after the events of the first season's finale, Hannah is taking care of a broken-legged and bedridden Adam while pursuing a casual relationship with another guy, a Republican college lawyer named Sandy. Marnie is "downsized" from her job at the art gallery, leaving her jobless, and her overbearing mother does not do much to cheer her up. New roommates, Hannah and Elijah, throw a party at their apartment; Shoshanna tries to avoid Ray, but the two end up reigniting their former fling, while Marnie has a cold interaction with Charlie's new girlfriend Audrey. Elijah argues with George and later has sex with Marnie, after which Marnie decides to visit Charlie. Jessa returns from her honeymoon with her new husband Thomas-John.
12	2	"I Get Ideas"	Lena Dunham	Jenni Konner	January 20, 2013	0.572
Elijah and George argue over the indiscretions that took place at the party, leading to the couple breaking up. After a bad job interview at another art gallery, Marnie begins to rethink her career options, and Shoshanna helps her acquire a new job as a club hostess. Jessa and Thomas-John are happily settled into married life, causing Hannah to question her own relationship with Sandy; Hannah later breaks up with Sandy after fighting with him over his politics. Hannah becomes concerned when Adam goes to worrying lengths to win her back, including sending her unsettling videos of himself singing. When Adam arrives at her apartment uninvited, Hannah calls 911 but hangs up. Nonetheless, the police arrive and arrest a belligerent Adam.
13	3	"Bad Friend"	Jesse Peretz	Lena Dunham & Sarah Heyward	January 27, 2013	0.759
Hannah is hired to do freelance work at an e-Internet company for $200 an article. For her first project, she procures cocaine from Laird, the ex-junkie who lives on the ground floor in her building, and takes it with Elijah, after which they go to a nightclub on an irresponsible excursion. Marnie goes to have sex with Booth Jonathan, the conceptual artist, whom she reunites with at her new hostess job. At the nightclub, a strung-out Elijah tells Hannah that he had sex with Marnie. Hannah gets angry and, after finding Laird following them, goes to Booth's house to lambast Marnie, accusing her of being a bad friend; she also tells Elijah that she is kicking him out. Hannah returns to her apartment building and has sex with Laird for her article.
14	4	"It's a Shame About Ray"	Jesse Peretz	Lena Dunham	February 2, 2013	0.516
Hannah hosts a dinner party at her apartment to celebrate the publishing of her online article, but the party turns awry when Audrey insults Marnie and lets her know how she feels. Charlie later makes a move on Marnie in private, but she rejects him, stating that she is in a relationship with Booth. Shoshanna finds out that Ray is living with her because he is currently homeless, and Ray tells Shoshanna he loves her. Jessa meets Thomas-John's parents during a dinner outing, but her aggressive attitude and truthful candor rubs the conservative couple the wrong way. Afterwards, Jessa and Thomas-John get into a huge argument, during which the two exchange deep insults about each other. Jessa visits Hannah and breaks down.
15	5	"One Man's Trash"	Richard Shepard	Lena Dunham	February 10, 2013	0.746
Hannah thinks she has invented the word "sexit", only to be caught in the middle of an argument between Ray and a neighbor named Joshua, who accuses Ray of dumping the shop's garbage in his trash cans. Hannah visits Joshua's fancy brownstone row house to confess that she is responsible for dumping the shop's trash; she ends up having sex with him for the entire weekend. Joshua comforts Hannah after she passes out in his shower; Hannah, realizing just how narcissistic and self-loathing she really is, breaks down in front of him. She tearfully asserts that she wants to be happy in life and wants to stop living out experiences for other people. The following morning, Hannah wakes up alone and quietly leaves Joshua's apartment.
16	6	"Boys"	Claudia Weill	Murray Miller	February 17, 2013	0.686
After getting a deal for an e-book, Hannah has difficulty coming up with any new material when she learns that there is a one-month deadline. Marnie helps Booth Jonathan with an event after his assistant quits, but is upset to learn that he does not believe they are dating. Hannah attends the party in hopes of getting over her writer's block, but ends up feeling out of place amongst Marnie's new friends. They call each other at the end of the night, but act as if everything is fine for both of them. Ray accompanies Adam to Staten Island to help him return a dog he stole, but the two end up getting into an argument when Ray insults Hannah. After making a failed attempt to return the dog, Ray cries as he laments his own life.
17	7	"Video Games"	Richard Shepard	Bruce Eric Kaplan	February 24, 2013	0.484
Hannah accompanies Jessa to visit her estranged father, Salvatore, who lives in a small town in upstate New York along with his new hippy wife Petula. During an evening excursion, Hannah has sex with Jessa's insecure 19-year-old step-brother, Frank. Jessa does not receive the warm welcome that she had hoped for from her father and tearfully confronts him for being absent during her childhood. Jessa subsequently abandons Hannah, who is forced to return to New York alone.
18	8	"It's Back"	Jesse Peretz	Lena Dunham & Steve Rubinshteyn & Deborah Schoeneman	March 3, 2013	0.673
Hannah hides her anxiety from her visiting parents, and is seen repeatedly doing things eight times as a symptom. Marnie is given the news that Charlie has succeeded with an app inspired by their breakup, which leads to her decision to follow her true passion for singing. Shoshanna sleeps with another man, the doorman of an apartment building that she attempts to attend for a party, which leads her to reconsider her relationship with Ray. Elsewhere, Adam begins seeing a girl named Natalia, who is the daughter of a woman from his AA meetings. Loreen and Tad realize that Hannah has experienced a relapse of obsessive-compulsive disorder and force her into therapy, during which Hannah reveals that her OCD started in high school.
19	9	"On All Fours"	Lena Dunham	Lena Dunham & Jenni Konner	March 10, 2013	0.677
Hannah's publisher, David, puts major pressure on her to speed up the deadline for her book, causing her relapsed OCD to spiral out of control. Hannah later sticks a Q-tip too far down her ear and has to go to the hospital. Marnie makes a small start for her passion to sing by performing a rendition of "Stronger" at an office party that Charlie throws to celebrate his latest app success. Marnie and Charlie then have sex in his office. Shoshanna and Ray rekindle, but Shoshanna does not confess her infidelity. While attending an engagement party for Natalia's friend, Adam briefly runs into Hannah and gets drunk. Later, Natalia is upset and uncomfortable when Adam, struggling to control his dark urges, becomes forceful and degrading in bed.
20	10	"Together"	Lena Dunham	Judd Apatow & Lena Dunham	March 17, 2013	0.632
Hannah's depression and OCD worsens as she faces a lawsuit by her publisher if she does not finish her book. Hannah leaves Jessa an angry message for abandoning her and impulsively asks Laird to cut her hair, during which Laird confronts her for her self-absorbed behavior. Ray tries to impress Shoshanna with a new managing position, but she breaks up with him, citing their age gap and his lack of ambition. Marnie confronts Charlie and reveals that she wants to rekindle their romantic relationship; Charlie admits that he is still in love with her, and the two reconcile. Still in the midst of an emotional breakdown, a distraught Hannah calls Adam. Realizing that she is in distress, Adam runs across town and barges into Hannah's apartment to comfort her; the two end up kissing.

=== Season 3 (2014) ===
No. overall	No. in season	Title	Directed by	Written by	Original release date	US viewers (millions)
21	1	"Females Only"	Lena Dunham	Lena Dunham	January 12, 2014	1.107
A few months after the events of the last season, Hannah has been able to combat her OCD with zoloft, while Adam moves into her apartment to look after her. Marnie is living with her divorced mother as she recovers from a second breakup with Charlie. Shoshanna establishes her priorities for studying to graduate from college after her breakup with Ray, who has moved into Adam's apartment. Hannah tries to ease Adam into her social circle by throwing a dinner party, which he reluctantly attends. Meanwhile, Jessa's divorce from Thomas-John has been finalized and she is secretly in rehab, but finds herself unpopular among the staff and other patients due to her careless attitude. After initiating a sexual encounter with another patient, Jessa is kicked out of rehab and calls Hannah to pick her up.
22	2	"Truth or Dare"	Lena Dunham	Jenni Konner	January 12, 2014	0.881
Hannah, Adam and Shoshanna take a road trip to pick up Jessa from rehab while discussing their various conflicts in life to compare with Jessa, who is spending time with a fellow alcoholic named Jasper while waiting for her friends to pick her up. Hannah tells Shoshanna about her college experiences with Jessa, and recalls Jessa's struggles with abandonment issues. Back in New York, Marnie moves out of her mother's house and into her new apartment. Hannah, Adam and Shoshanna arrive at the rehab center; Hannah derides Jessa for abandoning her and being unavailable for months, but the two ultimately reconcile their friendship.
23	3	"She Said OK"	Jesse Peretz	Lena Dunham & Jenni Konner	January 19, 2014	0.799
Adam's mentally unstable sister Caroline visits her brother and Hannah after losing her job. Dismissing advice from Adam about his sister's mental state, Hannah invites Caroline to her 25th birthday party that Loreen and Tad have organized for her, and allows her to stay at the apartment. Meanwhile, Marnie deals with the recent upload of a humiliating music video that she and Charlie made before their breakup, and tries to get the video taken down. Ray cuts off ties with Shoshanna altogether, admitting that he does not want to pursue a friendship with her. Later, at Hannah's party, Ray gets into a brawl with Hannah's flamboyant editor, David, over the party's music and his drunk behavior.
24	4	"Dead Inside"	Jesse Peretz	Judd Apatow & Lena Dunham	January 26, 2014	0.655
When David is unexpectedly found dead, Adam criticizes Hannah when she appears to be more concerned about the fate of her eBook. Unable to match Adam's emotional depth, Hannah confides in Caroline, who recounts a story about her late cousin Margaret before revealing that she made it up. Later, Hannah tries to portray her sympathy to Adam by relaying Caroline's fabricated story. After catching Ray and his boss, Hermie, streaming her music video during a shift at the new Grumpy's coffeehouse, Marnie has a mental breakdown and quits. Following Shoshanna's advice, Jessa tries to visit the grave of her late friend Season, only to learn that she is still alive; Season accuses Jessa of being an "enabler" and reveals she faked her own death to get away from Jessa.
25	5	"Only Child"	Tricia Brock	Murray Miller	February 1, 2014	0.278
At David's funeral, Hannah learns from his wife that her eBook deal is dead. Hannah lands an interview with a new publishing company who expresses interest in publishing her material, but she later learns that she cannot access her eBook from David's company for three years. Meanwhile, Jessa goes looking for work, while Marnie goes to Ray looking for advice over Charlie, which results in a brief lovemaking session. Elsewhere, Caroline and Adam angrily air out their frustrations with each other. Due to the mounting tension, Hannah kicks Caroline out of the apartment after finally seeing just how deranged and irresponsible Caroline really is, but Adam is angry with Hannah for failing to consult him first.
26	6	"Free Snacks"	Jamie Babbit	Paul Simms	February 9, 2014	0.833
Hannah begins a job writing advertorials at GQ. She bonds with her new colleagues, but begins to worry that working for the magazine will diminish her as a "real" writer, causing her to break down over the prospects. After their previous encounter, Marnie and Ray begin to spend more time together. Jessa begins working as a clerk at a children's boutique, while Shoshanna decides that she wants to change her ways and commit to a serious relationship. Deciding to pursue an acting career, Adam attends auditions for a role on a Broadway show and gets a callback.
27	7	"Beach House"	Jesse Peretz	Jenni Konner & Lena Dunham & Judd Apatow	February 16, 2014	0.942
Marnie invites the girls to spend the weekend at her mother's friend's beach house on Long Island, but her perfectionism quickly becomes stifling when Hannah runs into Elijah and his gay friends and invites them over without consulting Marnie. Before the night is out, Marnie confronts Hannah for inviting Elijah and abruptly changing the weekend plans, after which the girls begin to argue over each other's shortcomings and personal faults. Shoshanna drunkenly confronts the girls, revealing her own feelings of being left out, and calling out Hannah's narcissism and feelings of entitlement, Marnie's perfectionism and insecurities, and Jessa's brashness and drug addiction. The following morning, the girls all silently reconcile via cleaning up the house prior to heading back home.
28	8	"Incidentals"	Richard Shepard	Lena Dunham & Sarah Heyward	February 23, 2014	0.916
Adam's Broadway callback for Major Barbara is successful, but Hannah worries that he will put his acting career before their relationship after she interviews a plainspoken Patti LuPone, who advises Hannah that the dynamics of her and Adam's relationship will change. Meanwhile, Marnie reunites with an old friend, Soo Jin, who is planning to open her own art gallery, and offers to help assist Soo Jin with the gallery opening. Later, Marnie suffers another emotional blow when Ray decides to end their sexual relationship, but she ends up bonding with Desi, Adam's newest acquaintance and Broadway co-star, who expresses an interest in her singing. Bored with her job at the children's boutique, Jessa quits her job and relapses into alcohol after Jasper from rehab tracks her down.
29	9	"Flo"	Richard Shepard	Bruce Eric Kaplan	March 2, 2014	0.801
Hannah learns that her maternal grandmother Flo is dying of pneumonia in Westchester. While comforting her mother and her two aunts, she witnesses them squabble over petty matters. Hannah and her academically-focused med school student Rebecca try to get along but it doesn't work out: Rebecca has a grudge against Hannah's past actions, while Hannah bluntly says Rebecca is a self-righteous bore with a stick up her ass. Rebecca and Hannah get into a minor car accident after Rebecca texts and drives; Rebecca's mother immediately blames Hannah, leading Loreen to angrily call her sister out for denying Rebecca's shortcomings. Adam arrives to tend to Hannah, who is forced to contemplate her future with Adam when Loreen asks her to tell Flo that she is engaged to be married. Hannah and Adam agree to do so, but Loreen later advises Hannah to reconsider her relationship with Adam, pointing out his volatile emotional state. When Flo recovers from the pneumonia, Hannah decides to return to New York, only to receive a phone call from Rebecca, who reveals that Flo has unexpectedly died of a heart attack.
30	10	"Role-Play"	Jesse Peretz	Lena Dunham & Judd Apatow	March 9, 2014	1.036
Fearing that Adam's work in the play is making him too distant, Hannah tries to reinvigorate their quirky sex life through an elaborate role-playing scenario in which she lures him to a bar and poses as a disgruntled hedge fund manager's wife. Her plan falls apart when Adam announces that he's temporarily moving in with Ray in order to focus on his rehearsals. Meanwhile, Marnie continues to bond with Desi while helping Soo Jin with the gallery opening. In order to keep Jessa away from Jasper, Shoshanna reunites Jasper with his estranged daughter, Dottie, who convinces him to leave Jessa so that she can take care of him. Jessa is incensed, but an unapologetic Shoshanna calls her a junkie.
31	11	"I Saw You"	Jesse Peretz	Lena Dunham & Paul Simms	March 16, 2014	0.719
After another enlightening interview with Patti LuPone, Hannah realizes that she is squandering her creative talents and decides to quit her job at GQ. Jessa, struggling to stay clean, decides to stop by Marnie and Soo Jin's gallery opening and quickly charms Bedelia, the artist being featured. In turn, Bedelia offers Jessa an archiving job, to Marnie's dismay. Later, Marnie and Desi perform a successful duet at an open mic concert, but Marnie finds out that Desi has a girlfriend, Clementine. Marnie ultimately returns to Ray's apartment to reconcile; Hannah, arriving at Ray's apartment with Adam, catches the two having sex.
32	12	"Two Plane Rides"	Lena Dunham	Lena Dunham	March 23, 2014	0.670
Hannah learns that Caroline has been living with Laird in the ground-floor apartment, and that they are expecting a baby together. Afterwards, Hannah receives an acceptance letter from the University of Iowa for their prestigious writers' workshop and is encouraged by her parents to jump at the opportunity. Bedelia asks Jessa to assist her in committing suicide. While a reluctant Jessa ultimately agrees, Bedelia balks and changes her mind after ingesting the drug. Shoshanna finds out that she is unable to graduate, and is angered to discover that Marnie slept with Ray. At the opening night of Major Barbara, Shoshanna begs Ray to take her back but is rejected, while Desi kisses Marnie after she gives him a James Taylor guitar pick, causing a rift in his relationship with Clementine. Despite positive reviews, Adam feels he blew his performance and scolds Hannah for psyching him out with her news about Iowa. They leave separately, and the episode ends with Hannah clutching the acceptance letter, smiling to herself.

=== Season 4 (2015) ===
No. overall	No. in season	Title	Directed by	Written by	Original release date	US viewers (millions)
33	1	"Iowa"	Lena Dunham	Lena Dunham & Judd Apatow	January 11, 2015	0.680
Hannah dines with her parents and Adam one last time before packing for Iowa. Shoshanna finally graduates from college after attending summer classes, but becomes annoyed by her divorced parents’ constant bickering. Jessa is confronted by Bedelia's angry daughter, who reveals that she will be taking her mother to her home in Connecticut. Jessa later confronts Hannah for moving to Iowa, accusing her of running away from her problems. Marnie and Desi play a tough jazz-brunch gig and continue their secret romantic tryst, while Clementine apologizes to Marnie for her feelings of jealousy. The following morning, Hannah quietly slips out of the apartment to leave for Iowa without saying goodbye to Adam, who pretends to be asleep.
34	2	"Triggering"	Lena Dunham	Jenni Konner & Lena Dunham	January 18, 2015	0.797
Hannah arrives in Iowa and is initially enchanted by how much easier life outside of New York City seems to be. However, the charm of it all begins to wear off after one of Hannah's stories ends up provoking a strongly negative reaction from her classmates in the writer's workshop. Later, Elijah shows up to surprise Hannah, and they end up crashing an undergrad frat party.
35	3	"Female Author"	Jesse Peretz	Sarah Heyward	January 25, 2015	0.721
While Elijah fits easily into Iowa's social scene, Hannah struggles with how to occupy her time with only one class per week. The two end up heading to a poet party where Hannah expresses her ambivalence about being a writer and ends up insulting each of her classmates out of frustration with them. Back in New York, Shoshanna has a successful job interview, but ends up sabotaging it at the last minute. Ray warns Marnie about Desi's intentions before their meeting with a record label. Elsewhere, Jessa pulls Adam into her chaotic and self-destructive life, which leads to the two of them getting arrested and Ray bailing them out.
36	4	"Cubbies"	Jesse Peretz	Bruce Eric Kaplan	February 8, 2015	0.406
Shoshanna has another job interview that goes rather poorly and she ends up spending the next day shopping with Ray. Desi tells Marnie that he loves her, and reveals that he has told Clementine about their affair. After lashing out at her classmates at the poet party, Hannah writes a non-apology apology letter and puts it in all of their cubbies. Later, Hannah has dinner with her father and confesses that she does not really want to stay in the program; Tad advises Hannah that the choice is up to her, and Hannah decides to head back to New York. Returning to her apartment, Hannah finds most of her furniture missing and is greeted by a woman named Mimi-Rose. She asks Adam if Mimi-Rose is his roommate, but quickly realizes that she is actually his girlfriend.
37	5	"Sit-In"	Richard Shepard	Paul Simms & Max Brockman	February 15, 2015	0.385
Hannah confronts Adam about Mimi-Rose and, feeling lost, locks herself in his bedroom refusing to leave. Adam and Mimi-Rose stay at Laird's apartment during Hannah's sit-in, where she is visited by her friends; Shoshanna now hates Adam, Marnie is consumed with her new relationship with Desi and is mostly unreachable, Ray is concerned with his own turmoil regarding a new traffic light outside of his apartment, and Laird and Caroline are obsessive new soon-to-be parents. Jessa apathetically tells Hannah that she introduced Adam and Mimi-Rose, stating that Adam is much happier and more open in NA now. Hannah finally speaks to Adam, during which Adam confesses that he was relieved when Hannah left for Iowa and that he may be in love with Mimi-Rose. Hannah leaves to the storage space Adam has rented for her and spends the night on her couch there.
38	6	"Close-Up"	Richard Shepard	Murray Miller	February 22, 2015	0.477
Shoshanna has another poor job interview at an instant soup manufacturer but accepts the invitation for a date with the interviewer, Scott. Meanwhile, Ray approaches the city council to bring an official complaint about the new traffic light on his street corner, which is causing noise caused by constant traffic congestion at all hours of the day and night. Marnie's affections for Desi begin to fade after they get into an argument over a song she wrote and its place in their showcase. Adam is now living with Mimi-Rose at her loft; Mimi-Rose tells him that she aborted a pregnancy a week ago that he did not know about. Adam is furious and packs up all of his belongings to move out, but ultimately stays. Elijah is now living with Hannah, who has decided she wants to begin a teaching career.
39	7	"Ask Me My Name"	Tricia Brock	Murray Miller & Jason Kim	March 1, 2015	0.639
Hannah succeeds in her new job as a substitute English-reading teacher, and she goes out for a date with another teacher named Fran. After an enjoyable dinner, Hannah invites Fran to go to one of Mimi-Rose's art shows; Adam angrily asks Hannah why she is there, and she admits that she does not know. Fran leaves and Mimi-Rose introduces Hannah to her ex-partner Ace; she also invites Hannah to the after party and asks Hannah to share a cab with her. The cab driver ends up accidentally hitting an old woman, and Hannah and Mimi-Rose decide to wait nearby while an ambulance comes; they end up in a laundromat and start to hash out their differences and insecurities. When they finally get to the after party, Hannah tells Adam that she likes Mimi-Rose and walks home alone.
40	8	"Tad & Loreen & Avi & Shanaz"	Jamie Babbit	Lena Dunham & Jenni Konner	March 8, 2015	0.708
Having befriended her student Cleo, Hannah spends time with her outside of school and convinces her to get a painful-looking frenulum piercing. Later, Hannah approaches Fran to apologize for ruining their date but he rebuffs her, implying that she's too dramatic for him. Shoshanna helps Ray amass local support for his upcoming campaign to run for a seat on the Brooklyn city council and is upset to learn that he is in love with Marnie. Deciding to follow Jessa's advice, Shoshanna tries to be sexually forward on her date with Scott. Marnie gets angry with Desi when she learns that he spent their entire $2,000 record label advance on guitar pedals. He later apologizes and proposes to her, and she accepts. In Michigan, Tad comes out to Loreen, who reacts badly. At a dinner party in celebration of her new tenure, Loreen gets upset when Tad toasts her and leaves the table. When Hannah calls her parents to rant about Fran, Loreen bluntly reveals to her that Tad is gay.
41	9	"Daddy Issues"	Jesse Peretz	Paul Simms	March 15, 2015	0.701
Tad visits Hannah in New York and befriends Elijah, while Hannah struggles with the idea of his homosexuality as he is her father. She is also baffled to hear that her parents plan to stay together. Meanwhile, Jessa and Ace have sex for the first time, and Ace leads Jessa to Mimi-Rose's apartment, hoping to make Mimi-Rose jealous and angering Adam. When Mimi-Rose decides that she "chooses herself" instead of either man, Jessa and Adam leave. Shoshanna plans an elaborate campaign party for Ray in the bar at a local bowling alley, where Marnie decides to announce her and Desi's engagement. When Ray learns that he has won the election for a city council seat, he gives a victory speech to everyone about being dedicated to the community, and he also strongly implies his love for Marnie.
42	10	"Home Birth"	Lena Dunham	Jenni Konner & Lena Dunham & Judd Apatow	March 22, 2015	0.687
Caroline goes into labor and insists on having a home birth in her bathtub. Shoshanna is offered a job which would require her to relocate to Tokyo; Scott begs her not to go, saying he will "be in love with [her] soon", but Hermie tells Shoshanna that she should not pass up a lucrative job opportunity. After being pestered for his approval, Ray snaps and tells Desi that he hates him, and that he will never be good enough for Marnie. Later, Desi does not show up to his and Marnie's showcase debut, and she performs solo to great applause. Hannah, Adam, and Jessa are called by Laird to help out with Caroline; Jessa discovers that the impending baby is actually breech, and Caroline is forcibly taken to the hospital to give birth. After the baby is born, Adam confesses that he misses Hannah and says he wants her back, but Hannah refuses. Jessa returns home, where Shoshanna excitedly tells her she is moving to Japan. Six months later, Hannah is seen holding hands and kissing Fran while walking down a New York street in winter.

=== Season 5 (2016) ===
No. overall	No. in season	Title	Directed by	Written by	Original release date	US viewers (millions)
43	1	"Wedding Day"	Lena Dunham	Lena Dunham	February 21, 2016	0.489
Picking up several months after the flash-forward ending of season four, Marnie is marrying Desi at an upstate mansion with all of her friends in attendance. Marnie micromanages her wedding to Desi while trying to maintain the facade of the breezy bride in dealing with the forecast rain, as well as Hannah naturally trying to be the center of attention. Marnie tasks Shoshanna with kicking out Hannah's date Fran, so the girls can get ready and have no distractions. Banished to the boys' den, Fran has an awkward moment with Adam. A dejected Ray steps in to help Desi with his wedding-day jitters. Adam has a brief romantic encounter with Jessa while she stands outside smoking a cigarette. Hannah apologizes to Marnie for her behaviour and admits that she is scared of the changes that will come after Marnie gets married. Marnie asks Hannah to pretend that she is doing the right thing, and Hannah reassures her that she is.
44	2	"Good Man"	Lena Dunham	Jenni Konner & Lena Dunham	February 28, 2016	0.533
In New York, an erratic and deranged roommate leads Fran to move in with Hannah. Later, Hannah gets an urgent call from her father, who reveals that he is in New York and asks Hannah to retrieve his wallet from the hotel room of Keith, a man he met online. After another unpleasant visit with Caroline, Adam goes to an AA meeting and runs into Jessa; they end up spending the day together. Meanwhile, Ray fears that the new cafe across the street is hurting his business, while Elijah is hit on by a famous TV news anchor named Dill Harcourt. Hannah calls her mother to inform her that Tad is in New York. In response, Loreen asks Hannah to tell Tad that she wants a divorce; Hannah emotionally relays the message to her father.
45	3	"Japan"	Jesse Peretz	Jenni Konner	March 6, 2016	0.497
Thriving at her new job in Japan, Shoshanna flirts with the boss Yoshi, but she reminds her two female work friends that she has a "kind of" boyfriend back in America. In New York, Hannah discovers naked pictures of Fran's ex-girlfriends on his phone and struggles with how to react. After viewing Adam's performance on a TV police procedural, Jessa shares her insights into his character. Shoshanna learns that her job in Japan may be ending soon and shares the news with Scott, who happily tells her to return to New York. Shoshanna agrees, but ultimately decides to stay in Japan; Scott, waiting at the airport with flowers, dumps the bouquet and leaves when he realizes that Shoshanna did not board her flight.
46	4	"Old Loves"	Jesse Peretz	Bruce Eric Kaplan	March 13, 2016	0.479
Hannah and Fran disagree about their teaching methods to their respective students. Marnie fumes over Desi's decision to launch a major construction project in their studio apartment. Marnie later encourages Hannah to work things out with Fran; in turn, Marnie realizes that she has to be less nitpicky in her marriage, and she returns to her and Desi's apartment to apologize. Elijah goes on his first official date with Dill Harcourt, and the two spend the night together. Jessa pushes Hannah away during an awkward rice-pudding meetup due to her insecurity over her secret growing attraction for Adam. Jessa then goes to Adam's apartment and professes her feelings for him; the two then have sex for the first time.
47	5	"Queen for Two Days"	Jesse Peretz	Tami Sagher	March 20, 2016	0.535
Hannah and Loreen embark on a female-empowerment retreat, where Loreen hopes for clarity in her situation with Tad and Hannah hopes to relish time away from Fran. After hearing stories from the other attendees about the failures of their own marriages, Loreen decides that her marriage to Tad is worth preserving. Meanwhile, Hannah quickly becomes bored, particularly as one of the supervisors keeps pestering her to put her phone away. Hannah tries to be alone and ends up bonding with a young woman who teaches yoga at the retreat, and shares her philosophies of life. While hanging out in the sauna, Hannah initiates sex with her, but subsequently cuts it short. Jessa meets up with her sister Minerva and asks for a large amount of money so that she can go back to college. When Minerva refuses, Adam offers to pay for Jessa's education instead. In Tokyo, Shoshanna has a new job as a cat cafe hostess, and she receives a surprise visit from her former boss Abigail; Shoshanna tearfully admits to Abigail that she is homesick.
48	6	"The Panic in Central Park"	Richard Shepard	Lena Dunham	March 27, 2016	0.586
Needing space after a fight with Desi, Marnie goes for a walk and has an unexpected encounter with Charlie, whom she has not seen for two years. Charlie takes Marnie on a day and night-long excursion throughout the city as she sees the strange and outgoing person that Charlie has become. After Marnie scams a wealthy older man at the Plaza Hotel, Marnie and Charlie spend the money and take a boat ride at Central Park, during which the two kiss before the boat accidentally tips over. They return to Charlie's apartment and have sex; Charlie proposes that they run away, and she admits that she doesn't need anything from her life. The following morning, Marnie decides to leave after discovering Charlie's heroin kit. She returns to her apartment and tells Desi that she wants to end their marriage.
49	7	"Hello Kitty"	Richard Shepard	Sarah Heyward	April 3, 2016	0.558
Hannah is reprimanded by the school principal for her unorthodox and inappropriate teaching methods and her mouthing off to her co-workers. Hannah responds by exposing her crotch to avoid getting into trouble, infuriating Fran, who begins to think that Hannah is too dramatic and self-absorbed for him to handle. Elijah attends a swanky party at Dill's apartment, but is put off after overhearing rumors about Dill's other relationships. At Adam's play, a nervous Jessa worries about seeing Hannah after their fight, and Marnie tells Ray that she has decided to leave Desi. Later, Desi informs Marnie that a major music producer wants to use their song in an upcoming episode of Grey's Anatomy, and they agree to start touring. Hannah is devastated when she sees Jessa and Adam seductively looking at each other, correctly assuming that they are sleeping together.
50	8	"Homeward Bound"	Jamie Babbit	Murray Miller	April 10, 2016	0.656
Hannah cuts short her planned summer road trip with Fran by breaking up with him. Stranded at a rest stop, Hannah is rescued by Ray, but their trip back to NYC gets derailed when she tries to thank him with a blowjob, causing Ray to crash the truck. Hannah abandons Ray by hitchhiking a ride with a stranger named Hector, who is moving to New York to escape his own troubled relationship. Adam stops by Laird's place and discovers that Caroline has disappeared days earlier for places unknown; Adam stays to help with the baby and gets Jessa to help him out while Laird goes to look for Caroline. Back from Japan, Shoshanna has an unpleasant run-in with Scott, who accuses her of being spoiled and entitled. While recording a new song, Marnie is given parameters for her relationship with Desi by his new girlfriend, Tandace.
51	9	"Love Stories"	Alex Karpovsky	Max Brockman & Jason Kim & Lena Dunham	April 17, 2016	0.582
Hannah throws Fran out of her apartment and then informs her boss, Principal Toby, that she will not be returning next semester; he praises her joie de vivre and wishes her well. Marnie has an unsettling sex dream about Ray and later tries to work things out with both Ray and Desi. Noticing that business is suffering at Ray's, Shoshanna offers to help Ray and Hermie with marketing as well as performing clandestine research on the competition across the street; she ultimately comes up with an idea to pander to the "anti-hipster" market. Elijah makes his pitch to Dill for their relationship to be exclusive, but is ultimately rejected. On the street, Hannah runs into Tally, her old friend-slash-nemesis, which leads to the two of them bonding via bicycle riding and pot smoking until Tally tells Hannah about her own life and the stresses of her successful writing career. Later that night, Hannah and Tally run into Adam and Jessa in the apartment lobby; Hannah and Tally collapse on the stairs in a fit of hysterical laughter.
52	10	"I Love You Baby"	Jenni Konner	Judd Apatow & Lena Dunham & Jenni Konner	April 17, 2016	0.512
In the season finale, Tad and Loreen, come to visit Hannah, who does everything she can to avoid seeing and talking to them. Eventually, Loreen and Elijah help Hannah with her plan to participate in the Moth Story Slam so she can express her inner feelings towards her insecurities. Meanwhile, Marnie prepares to go on tour with Desi, while she decides to reconnect with Ray by inviting him to join them on their tour. Shoshanna's marketing strategy for Ray's coffee house is met with great success, and Hermie hires her to work there as a reward. Tad and Keith finally reconnect with each other. After helping take care of the baby, Jessa and Adam have an epic physical fight and they destroy the interior of his apartment, wherein Jessa finally admits that she feels guilty at having hurt Hannah by taking her boyfriend, that she misses her friend enormously, and that she will never forgive Adam for that. During her Moth Story Slam reading, Hannah maturely recounts her feelings about Jessa and Adam's relationship, and reveals that she overheard part of their argument while dropping off a fruit basket to wish them well.

=== Season 6 (2017) ===
No. overall	No. in season	Title	Directed by	Written by	Original release date	US viewers (millions)
53	1	"All I Ever Wanted"	Lena Dunham	Lena Dunham & Jenni Konner	February 12, 2017	0.519
Several months later, after her piece about Jessa and Adam's relationship is published in The New York Times, Hannah is sent on an assignment to a surf camp in the Hamptons by a magazine publisher. Although she initially dislikes it, she soon loosens up when she pursues a sexual tryst with her free-spirited instructor, Paul-Louis. Back in New York City, Marnie struggles to come to terms with her divorce from Desi, particularly after watching Ray and Shoshanna's friendly, affectionate interactions. At the same time, Ray decides to crash at Adam and Jessa's apartment despite both of them being deeply and sexually involved with each other.
54	2	"Hostage Situation"	Lena Dunham	Lena Dunham	February 19, 2017	0.708
Hannah reluctantly agrees to accompany Marnie and Desi on a weekend trip to Poughkeepsie, in order to provide Ray with a cover story. In Poughkeepsie, Marnie discovers that Desi has been addicted to Oxycontin for a year, resulting in a violent argument. After shutting Desi out of the house, Hannah gently explains to Marnie that she didn't notice Desi's drug addiction because she spends too much time thinking about herself, which Hannah admits she understands all too well. She reaffirms their friendship, and eventually helps her take Desi home. Meanwhile, Jessa invites herself to a networking event organized by Shoshanna's former college friends, who started their own clothing line. Shoshanna is confronted by her former friends for having bailed on their Spring Break trip to Aruba, and for subsequently abandoning them in order to pursue friendships with Jessa's circle. Outside, a seething Shoshanna snaps at Jessa and accuses her of ruining her life.
55	3	"American Bitch"	Richard Shepard	Lena Dunham	February 24, 2017 (online); February 26, 2017 (HBO)	0.383
Hannah visits the upscale apartment of Chuck Palmer, a famed, prize-winning writer, who has summoned her after reading an article that she wrote accusing him of coercing college students into having sex with him, and desiring to give her his side of the story. The two engage in a long and tense debate about Chuck's shortcomings in his interactions towards women, as he appears unaware of the impact of the power imbalance between him and the college girls Hannah quoted. He also points out Hannah's journalistic mistake, since most of her sources for the article were Tumblr blog posts, and therefore relied on hearsay. Hannah and Chuck begin to bond over their shared literary preferences, and their perceived insecurities. However, after Hannah apologizes for writing the article, Chuck manipulates her into grabbing his penis, and Hannah finally understands who he really is. Hannah reluctantly avoids making a scene by agreeing to listen to a flute recital by Chuck's visiting daughter, and leaves, looking visibly ashamed, humiliated and enraged.
56	4	"Painful Evacuation"	Jesse Peretz	Lena Dunham & Jenni Konner	March 5, 2017	0.571
Emotionally rejected by Marnie, Ray begins to feel disillusioned about their relationship, particularly when she rejects his effort to hang out with her. When one of Grumpy's regular customers collapses and dies after Ray is brusque with him, Ray and Hermie get into an argument over the idea that Ray is wasting his potential. Later, Ray goes to Hermie's apartment to apologize, only to find that he has died. Adam and Jessa decide to make a movie together based on their situation with Hannah. Meanwhile, Hannah suffers from a urinary tract infection due to her HPV, and decides to go to the emergency room to get some antibiotics; she has a surprise encounter with Joshua, who reveals that Hannah is pregnant. When he immediately assumes that she will want an abortion, Hannah leaves the ER without getting any treatment for her infection. On her way home, Hannah is confronted by Jessa and Adam, who ask for her permission to make their movie. Irritated and still in shock from her discovery, Hannah mutters her consent.
57	5	"Gummies"	Jesse Peretz	Sarah Heyward	March 12, 2017	0.703
While working on their upcoming film, Jessa becomes worried by some of the lines of dialogue about Hannah and Adam's relationship, which Jessa realizes more accurately reflects their own; Jessa also becomes concerned that Adam is acting sympathetically towards "Hannah" during the filming. Meanwhile, a grieving Ray is going through Hermie's apartment with a disinterested Marnie. Finally fed up with Marnie's self-absorbed behaviour, Ray breaks up with her. Hannah reveals her pregnancy to Loreen, who is visiting for a few days. Although Loreen appears happy with the news, it becomes clear that she has become addicted to cannabis and is struggling to cope with being alone after her divorce. After a fight with Hannah at a laundromat while high, Loreen disappears. Elijah and Hannah find Loreen eating at a Chinese restaurant; Loreen breaks the news of Hannah's pregnancy to Elijah, who does not take it well, and bluntly tells Hannah she would be a terrible mother because she is selfish and self-obsessed.
58	6	"Full Disclosure"	Jamie Babbit	Murray Miller	March 19, 2017	0.576
Hannah finally informs Marnie of her pregnancy, and although she reacts positively, insists that Hannah has to tell the father. Marnie struggles to convince Desi to perform at a club in New Jersey as a favor to her mother; Desi ultimately turns up high, forcing Marnie to perform with her mother. Adam asks Hannah to watch the first cut of his film, saying he wants her to confirm its accuracy; in response, Hannah abruptly tells him she is pregnant. Adam informs Jessa, who confronts Hannah for not telling her about the pregnancy; Hannah responds that she does not care about Jessa, and that they were never real friends. Jessa tearfully tries to guilt Hannah into feeling bad about what she said, but Hannah simply retorts "I don't care anymore." Elijah, working in retail at his second job, realizes his thespian talent when he agrees to read lines from a play that his co-worker is auditioning for. Hannah makes a half-hearted attempt to contact Paul-Louis, but does not succeed. In frustration, she decides to watch Adam's film and is caught off-guard by its surprisingly raw and emotional opening scene.
59	7	"The Bounce"	Richard Shepard	Murray Miller & Tami Sagher	March 26, 2017	0.675
Elijah attends a workshop audition for a stage remake of White Men Can't Jump. On his way out, Elijah is surprised by Dill, who is trying to hide from the paparazzi due to a recent scandal involving him trying to adopt a baby on the black market. While hiding at the apartment, Dill learns of Hannah's dilemma and admits that not having a father figure growing up was the reason he couldn't bring himself to love anybody. Paul-Louis finally calls Hannah back; he is surprised by her pregnancy and offers emotional support, but admits he is not ready to be a father. Elijah returns from the audition and stands up to Dill, after which the two have sex. The next morning, Elijah is offered a part in the play by the producers. Elsewhere, Marnie receives an eviction notice and tries to pawn some of her jewelry, only to discover that they are cheap knockoffs. When Marnie throws a tantrum over the revelation, the appraiser advises Marnie that she is merely trying to blame other people for her predicament. Deeply affected by this encounter, Marnie decides to move back in with her mom and leaves an apologetic voice message for Desi, realizing that she needs to take responsibility for her own life.
60	8	"What Will We Do This Time About Adam?"	Jesse Peretz	Judd Apatow & Lena Dunham	April 2, 2017	0.765
Having given in to his nostalgia, Adam expresses interest in helping Hannah raise her baby. Fearing that Adam will leave her for good, Jessa offers no resistance and solicits a sexual encounter with a stranger in a bar. She starts to cry realizing the sex isn’t what she really wants. Ray and Shoshanna meet for lunch and run into her former boss Abigail; Ray and Abigail hit it off, and the two decide to work together to continue Hermie's pet project of documenting the effects of gentrification. The two later share a kiss while riding a merry-go-round that evening. Adam tracks Hannah down and makes his pitch; still riding her wave of loneliness after Paul-Louis's phone call, Hannah invites him home for sex. Appearing to have reconciled, Hannah starts making plans for raising the baby with Adam. However, by the day's end, Adam and Hannah both tearfully come to the realization that their enthusiasm for their relationship has already gone. The two return home separately, with Adam phoning a relieved Jessa to buzz him in to their apartment, while Hannah lies on her bed weeping, her fears of having to raise her baby alone now returned.
61	9	"Goodbye Tour"	Nisha Ganatra	Jenni Konner & Lena Dunham	April 9, 2017	0.734
Hannah interviews for a position at a college upstate with Phaedra, a creative writing professor who discovered Hannah's work online. While heading back to the city, Hannah receives a job offer. Elijah tries to convince Hannah to stay in New York, but she insists on giving a better environment for her baby. After Marnie fails to answer her calls, Hannah heads to Shoshanna's apartment, only to find the other girls there celebrating Shoshanna's engagement party. Hannah confronts Shoshanna for intentionally not inviting her to the party; Marnie, sensing the looming threat of a fight, calls a group meeting with Hannah, Jessa and Shoshanna in the bathroom to resolve their friendship issues. Shoshanna lambasts the girls for their self-absorbed behaviors, and declares that she no longer wants to be friends with any of them. After the confrontation, Jessa apologizes to Hannah for her past actions, and the two make peace. In one final hurrah, the girls end the night dancing in the apartment, albeit individually. The episode ends as Hannah finally leaves the city and moves into her new home upstate.
62	10	"Latching"	Jenni Konner	Lena Dunham & Jenni Konner & Judd Apatow	April 16, 2017	0.741
Needing direction in life, Marnie asks Hannah if she can move in with her to help raise her baby, to which Hannah agrees. Five months later, Hannah has given birth to a mixed-race boy named "Grover", which was Paul-Louis's preferred name, and is struggling with stress because Grover will not breastfeed. Marnie eventually calls Loreen for help, enraging Hannah further; after a particularly angry fight with her mother, Hannah storms off. While Hannah is gone, Loreen advises Marnie that she should not put her love for Hannah above her own happiness. Hannah offers support towards a distressed teenage girl running from a house in a state of undress. Upon discovering the girl is actually just a bratty teen running away because her mother ordered her to do her homework, Hannah angrily berates her, in turn coming to her own understanding about motherhood. Hannah returns home to find Loreen and Marnie sitting on the porch; they make space for her, the three finally at peace for the night. When Grover's crying emerges on the baby monitor, Hannah goes to soothe Grover and tries breastfeeding him again; she is relieved when he finally latches.

== Ratings ==
Girls : U.S. viewers per episode (thousands)

Season	Episode number												Average
Season	1	2	3	4	5	6	7	8	9	10	11	12	Average
1	872	858	816	743	830	678	868	1094	866	1004	–		860
2	866	572	759	516	746	686	484	673	677	632	–		660
3	1107	881	799	655	278	833	942	916	801	1036	719	670	800
4	680	797	721	406	385	477	639	708	701	687	–		620
5	489	533	497	479	535	586	558	656	582	512	–		540
6	519	708	383	571	703	576	675	765	734	741	–		640

Audience measurement performed by Nielsen Media Research
