= American Bitch =

- Girls episode
- Episode no.: Season 6 Episode 3
- Directed by: Richard Shepard
- Written by: Lena Dunham
- Original air date: February 26, 2017

Guest appearances
- Matthew Rhys as Chuck Palmer; Caroline Watters as Miranda Palmer

Episode chronology
| ← Previous "Hostage Situation" | Next → "Painful Evacuation" |

"American Bitch" is the third episode of the sixth season of the American television drama series Girls and the 55th episode of the series overall. It is written by Lena Dunham, and directed by Richard Shepard. It aired on the HBO channel in the United States on February 26, 2017.

The episode focuses on Hannah (Dunham), who meets with a fiction writer, Chuck Palmer (Matthew Rhys), whom she recently wrote about concerning sexual misconduct allegations made against him. Palmer invites her to his New York City apartment where they talk about her story, his life and literature while also debating the allegations swirling around him. The episode tackles fame, wealth, privilege, consent, cancel culture, and power imbalances between men and women. It's the first bottle episode since Season 2's "One Man's Trash" (2013).

The episode received critical acclaim with praise for the writing and the performance by Matthew Rhys who received a nomination for the Primetime Emmy Award for Outstanding Guest Actor in a Comedy Series. Due to the Academy Awards telecast, HBO made this episode available to watch on HBO Go and HBO Now ahead of Girls usual airtime of Sundays at 10 pm.

== Summary ==
Hannah has a tense meeting with Chuck Palmer, an author she once greatly admired, about the disturbing allegations swirling around him. Together they debate the ethics of journalism, power imbalances and privilege. She notices that Palmer has a signed copy of the novel When She Was Good by Philip Roth. She mentions how it was rumored that the book's alternate title is American Bitch. Palmer's apartment features a photo with him and Toni Morrison and a painting of Woody Allen, both prominently featured. Together they share a connection and bond over literature.

After they have established a rapport, Chuck suddenly asks Hannah to sit with him on the bed, which makes Hannah uncomfortable, but she complies. He then exposes himself to her, placing his penis next to her. She is shocked, but obligatorily puts her hand on his penis to pleasure him. Hannah realizes what is happening and jumps up from the bed; Chuck smirks, having manipulated her just as he hoped.

Before she leaves the apartment his young daughter Miranda Palmer (Caroline Watters) arrives, who wants to practice her flute playing. Hannah is introduced to her and Miranda asks if she can play for them. The episode ends with Hannah watching Chuck as he admires his daughter performing Rihanna's "Desperado" on her flute.

== Production ==
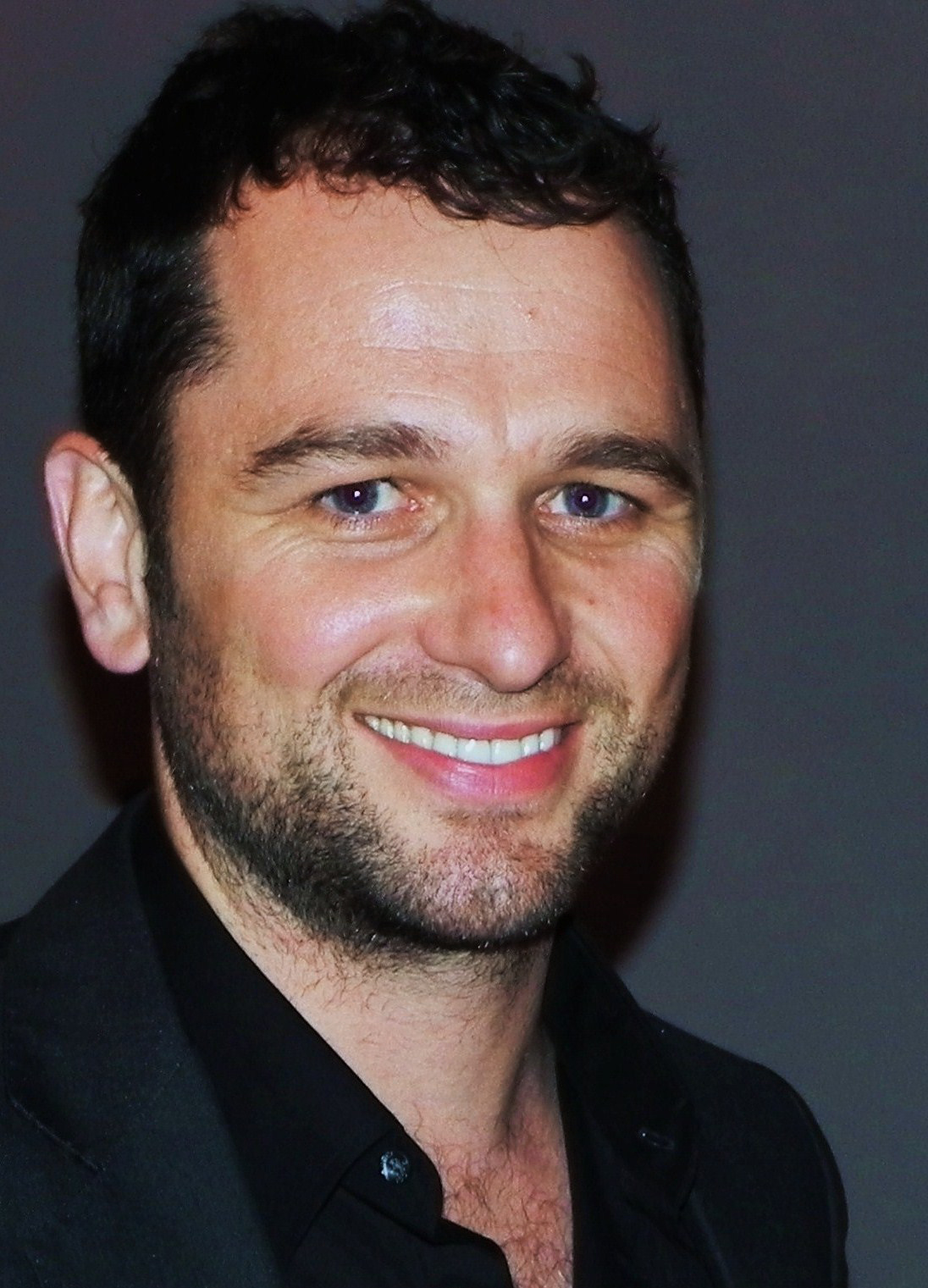
Matthew Rhys won acclaim for his role as Chuck Palmer in this episode

Dunham said the story came about when discussing "the gray areas of power dynamics" and putting "Hannah in a scenario where she had to grapple with this intellectually". Executive producer Judd Apatow stated "what's interesting in the episode [is that Palmer] thinks he's the one being used" by the college students, while noting that the episode is about consent and how powerful men "[abuse] their charisma". The episode is the first to feature only Hannah's character from the main cast since Season 2's "One Man's Trash" in 2013, which was a two-hander between Dunham and Patrick Wilson. Richard Shepard told IndieWire, "The bottle episodes are extremely challenging and also extremely fun because you get to spend all this direct time with the actors and the characters ... and you get to shift the cinematic style a little bit because of the nature of whatever it is. We do things that had not been done on the show before."

== Reception ==
=== Critical reception ===
The episode received critical acclaim with Caroline Framke of Vox wrote "[it] isn’t so much about Hannah as about the inherent power imbalance between younger women and older men... Dunham’s script is sharp and pithy as per usual, but maybe the smartest thing “American Bitch” did was cast Rhys [who] manages to make Chuck both menacing and pathetic." Critic Emily Nussbaum of The New Yorker wrote of the episode, "It’s a power game that’s a little bit David Mamet’s Oleanna, a little bit Michael Chabon’s Wonder Boys, a little bit Apatow’s Funny People with some Clouds of Sils Maria. In certain ways, it’s a classic exchange between an older artist (rich, decadent, in print) and a younger artist (poor, moralistic, online)." She added, "[It] is a cunning episode; it’s a timely one, too". Amber Dowling of IndieWire, praised the structure and writing declaring, "The entire episode’s dialogue is sharp, smart and crackling; it would be possible to watch Rhys and Dunham verbally spar for hours. As the 27 minutes unroll, you see both sides of the argument"

=== Release ===
Due to the Academy Awards telecast on Sunday, HBO made this episode available to watch on HBO Go and HBO Now ahead of Girls usual airtime of Sundays at 10 pm.

=== Accolades ===
| Year | Association | Category | Nominee | Result | Ref. |
|---|---|---|---|---|---|
| 2017 | Primetime Emmy Awards | Outstanding Guest Actor in a Comedy Series | Matthew Rhys (episode: American Bitch) | Nominated | |
