= Girls (TV series) =

American comedy drama television series

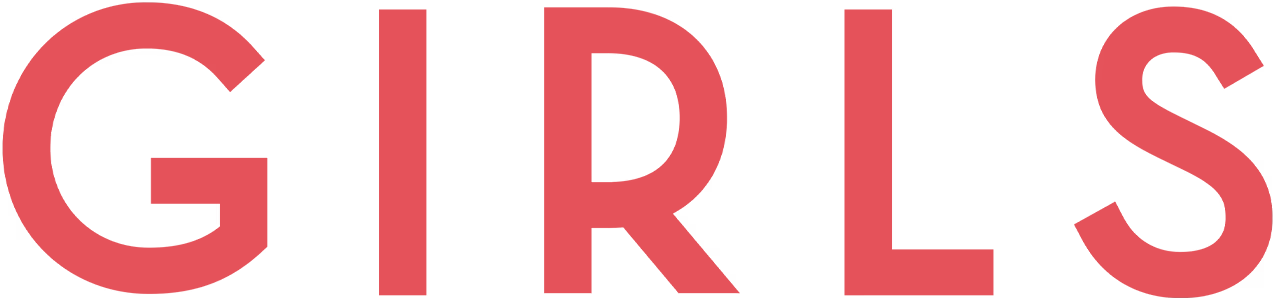
- Genre: Comedy drama; Cringe comedy
- Created by: Lena Dunham
- Showrunner: Lena Dunham
- Starring: Lena Dunham; Allison Williams; Jemima Kirke; Zosia Mamet; Adam Driver; Alex Karpovsky; Andrew Rannells; Ebon Moss-Bachrach; Jake Lacy
- Composer: Michael Penn
- Country of origin: United States
- Original language: English
- No. of seasons: 6
- No. of episodes: 62 (list of episodes)

Production
- Executive producers: Lena Dunham; Judd Apatow; Jenni Konner; Ilene S. Landress; Bruce Eric Kaplan
- Producers: Peter Phillips; Dan Sterling
- Editors: Shawn Paper; Paul Zucker; Myron Kerstein; Nat Sanders; Kate Hickey; Robert Franzen; Catherine Haight
- Camera setup: Single-camera
- Running time: 26–41 minutes
- Production companies: Apatow Productions; I Am Jenni Konner Productions; HBO Entertainment

Original release
- Network: HBO
- Release: April 15, 2012 – April 16, 2017

Girls is an American comedy-drama television series created by and starring Lena Dunham, executive-produced by Judd Apatow. The series depicts four young women living in New York City. The show's premise was drawn from Dunham's own life, as are major aspects of the main character, including financial isolation from her parents, becoming a writer, and making unfortunate decisions. The series is known for its commentary on postfeminism and conversation around body politics and female sexuality.

Lena Dunham created Girls with the intention of offering a more realistic and nuanced portrayal of the lives of young women in their twenties. The show, which premiered on HBO in 2012, revolved around a group of friends played by Dunham, Allison Williams, Jemima Kirke, and Zosia Mamet, navigating the challenges of relationships, work, and self-discovery in New York. The first season of Girls was filmed between April and August 2011. The first three episodes were screened at the 2012 SXSW Festival and the series premiered on HBO on April 15, 2012. The series ran for six seasons until April 16, 2017. There are a total of 62 episodes. A five-episode revival of the series is scheduled to begin production in 2027.

Dunham, who both created and starred in the series, aimed to provide an authentic representation of the experiences, struggles, and relationships of young women. She wanted to present a narrative that went beyond the glamorous or idealized portrayals often seen in mainstream media. Girls received attention for its frank and sometimes controversial depictions of sex, relationships, and personal growth. The cringe comedy show was seen as a departure from traditional television narratives, offering a more unfiltered and honest exploration of the complexities of adulthood, particularly from a female perspective.

The show has received critical praise and numerous awards, including the Golden Globe Award for Best Television Series – Musical or Comedy and the British Academy Television Award for Best International Programme.

In 2019, Girls was ranked 18th on The Guardian's list of the 100 greatest TV shows of the 21st century. In 2021, BBC placed it 30th on its list of the best series of the century. In 2022, the series was ranked 65th on Rolling Stone's list of the 100 greatest TV shows. In 2023, Variety included it at 86th on its own list of the greatest TV series of all time. In 2026, The New York Times ranked it the 13th best TV show of the 21st century.

== Synopsis ==
Two years after graduating from Oberlin College, aspiring writer Hannah Horvath is shocked when her parents announce they will no longer financially support her life in Brooklyn. Left to her own devices, Hannah navigates her twenties "one mistake at a time." Allison Williams, Jemima Kirke, Zosia Mamet, Adam Driver, Alex Karpovsky, and Andrew Rannells co-star as Hannah's circle of friends, as they cycle through friendships, romantic partners, careers, and new experiences.

== Topics explored ==
Girls explores several topics across its six seasons. Dunham explains Girls never started with an "overt, political, or even [exact] artistic mission statement." While the primary themes in the television show explore interpersonal relationships—particularly female friendship and romantic affairs—New York City culture, coming-of-age struggle, career, mental health, artistic boundaries and self-reflection, Dunham states the show was never "stuck in any specific formula." She also noted "the series reflects a part of the population that hasn’t previously been seen on either film or television and fills the gap between the characters on Sex and the City and the CW’s Gossip Girl." The series ultimately explores how significantly flawed, unlikable, morally ambiguous characters in their twenties navigate the challenges of adulthood and learn to embrace their imperfections.

== Cast and characters ==
Promotional poster for the series premiere showing the cast. From left to right: Jemima Kirke (Jessa), Allison Williams (Marnie), Lena Dunham (Hannah), and Zosia Mamet (Shoshanna).

=== Main cast ===
- Lena Dunham as Hannah Helene Horvath: an aspiring writer living in Greenpoint, Brooklyn, originally from East Lansing, Michigan, known for her spunk and bad decisions, who struggles to support herself and find a direction in her life. There is much conversation about Hannah's body and her own (as well as other characters') perception of it. In season two, she struggles with a relapse of the OCD symptoms she suffered from in her youth. In the final season, she becomes pregnant after a brief fling, and later leaves New York City to take a teaching job upstate and raise her baby.
- Allison Williams as Marnie Marie Michaels: Hannah's best friend and, at the start of season 1, roommate. Marnie struggles in her relationships with Charlie and Ray for much of the series, and eventually ends up marrying her musical partner, Desi Harperin. When both her career and marriage ultimately collapse, she moves upstate with Hannah to help raise her baby.
- Jemima Kirke as Jessa Johansson: One of Hannah's closest friends, Jessa is a global citizen of British origin and is known for being bohemian, unpredictable, and brash. Throughout the course of the series she deals with the consequences of poor choices, including a short-lived marriage and a stint in rehab due to heroin and cocaine addiction. When she pursues a relationship with Hannah's ex-boyfriend Adam, she and Hannah have an explosive falling-out. Ultimately, Hannah and Jessa manage to reconcile before Hannah's departure from New York.
- Zosia Mamet as Shoshanna Shapiro: Jessa's naive and innocent American cousin who is a Media, Culture, and Communications major at New York University. She is embarrassed to still be a virgin at the start of the series. The character is fast-talking and her lack of enunciation gives her a mumbling, nervous persona. After a brief career stint in Japan, she comes to realize that her friendship with the other three has only ever held her back, and ultimately distances herself from them.
- Adam Driver as Adam Sackler: an aloof, passionate young man who works as a part-time carpenter and actor. At the start of the series, he is in a casual relationship with Hannah, which becomes serious before ultimately falling apart as he gains success as an actor. He later enters a volatile relationship with Jessa, which is implied to be ongoing as the series ends. Adam is an alcoholic who has been sober for years.
- Christopher Abbott as Charlie Dattolo (seasons 1–2, 5): Marnie's smothering boyfriend until he eventually tells her he never loved her. He gets rich from starting an app, but later loses all his money when the startup goes under. When Marnie runs into him a few years later, he is a drug dealing junkie.
- Alex Karpovsky as Raymond "Ray" Ploshansky (seasons 2–6; recurring season 1): Originally Charlie's friend, but later a friend of the others, he is the group's straight man. Eventually, he has sexual and romantic relationships with both Shoshanna and Marnie. At the start of season 3, he is made manager of a spin-off of Grumpy's, called Ray's.
- Andrew Rannells as Elijah Krantz (seasons 4–6; recurring seasons 1–3): Hannah's ex-boyfriend from college, who reveals that he is gay. Despite some initial hostility between the pair, they eventually become friends and later roommates on and off. The two grow much closer as roommates.
- Ebon Moss-Bachrach as Desi Harperin (seasons 4–6; recurring season 3): Adam's co-star in Major Barbara and Marnie's bandmate. Desi and Marnie become engaged and later marry. Marnie ends the relationship with him when she tires of his childishness and self-indulgence. In season 6, it is revealed that Desi is addicted to prescription pain killers.
- Jake Lacy as Fran Parker (season 5; recurring season 4): A colleague of Hannah's whom she dates. In season 5, Fran moves in with Hannah and Elijah, but he and Hannah break up by the end of the season.

=== Recurring guests ===
- Becky Ann Baker and Peter Scolari as Hannah's parents, Loreen and Tad Horvath (seasons 1–6)
- Kathryn Hahn and James LeGros as Katherine and Jeff Lavoyt, the parents of two young girls who Jessa babysat (season 1)
- Chris O'Dowd as Thomas-John, an affluent venture capitalist. (seasons 1–2)
- Rita Wilson as Evie Michaels, Marnie's mother. (seasons 2–6)
- Jon Glaser as Laird Schlesinger, Hannah's neighbor and a recovering drug addict. (seasons 2–6)
- Colin Quinn as Hermie, Ray's boss at the coffee shop. He dies in "Painful Evacuation" from scleroderma. (seasons 2–6)
- John Cameron Mitchell as David Pressler-Goings, Hannah's editor for her e-book. (seasons 2–3)
- Shiri Appleby as Natalia, Adam's ex-girlfriend. He abruptly breaks up with her after getting back together with Hannah. (seasons 2–3)
- Gaby Hoffmann as Caroline Sackler, Adam's extremely troubled sister. (seasons 3–6)
- Richard E. Grant as Jasper, Jessa's friend from rehab. (season 3)
- Gillian Jacobs as Mimi-Rose Howard, Adam's new girlfriend after Hannah moves away to Iowa. (season 4)
- Jason Ritter as Scott, an entrepreneur and Shoshanna's boyfriend. (seasons 4–5)
- Aidy Bryant as Abigail, Shoshanna's former boss from when she worked in Japan. (seasons 4–6)
- Corey Stoll as Dill Harcort, a successful news anchor and Elijah's love interest. (seasons 5–6)

=== Guest stars ===
- Chris Eigeman as Hannah's boss who fires her in the pilot. (season 1)
- Mike Birbiglia as Brian, an employer who briefly interviews Hannah for a job. (season 1)
- Skylar Astin as Matt Kornstein, Shoshanna's former camp counselor. (season 1)
- Bobby Moynihan as Thadd, Thomas-John's best man. (season 1)
- Jenny Slate as Tally Schifrin, a former classmate of Hannah whose professional success is a source of annoyance. (season 1, season 5)
- Michael Imperioli as Powell Goldman, a former writing mentor of Hannah's she meets at a party. (season 1, episode 9)
- Billy Morrisette as George, Elijah's first boyfriend after coming out to Hannah. (seasons 1–2)
- Donald Glover as Sandy, a Black Republican who Hannah briefly dates. (season 2)
- Jorma Taccone as Booth Jonathan, an avant-garde artist who leads Marnie on romantically after they meet at an art gallery. (seasons 1–2)
- Greta Lee as Soojin, Booth's former assistant who hopes to open her own art gallery, much to Marnie's annoyance. (seasons 2–3)
- Ben Mendelsohn as Salvatore, Jessa's flaky dad. (season 2)
- Carol Kane as a member of Adam's AA group. (season 2)
- Patrick Wilson as Joshua, a doctor with whom Hannah has a one-night stand. Years later, he delivers the news that she is pregnant. (season 2, season 6)
- Amy Schumer as Angie, Natalia's friend. (seasons 2–3)
- Bob Balaban as Dr. Rice, Hannah's therapist. (Seasons 2–4)
- Danielle Brooks as Laura, one of Jessa's co-rehabbers. She is the first African-American woman to appear on the show. (season 3)
- June Squibb as Grandma Flo, Hannah Horvath's dying grandmother. (season 3)
- Felicity Jones as Dottie, the daughter of Richard E. Grant's Jasper. (season 3)
- Patti LuPone as a fictionalized version of herself. (season 3)
- Reed Birney as the fictional husband of Patti LuPone.(season 3)
- Jenna Lyons as Janice, Hannah's boss at GQ magazine. (season 3)
- Amir Arison, Jessica Williams, and Michael Zegen as Kevin Mimma, Karen, and Joe, Hannah's colleagues at GQ. (season 3)
- Natalie Morales as Clementine Barrios, Desi's girlfriend who he leaves to be with Marnie. (seasons 3–4)
- Louise Lasser as Beadie, an artist for whom Jessa briefly works as an assistant. (season 3–4)
- Jason Kim, Marin Ireland, Desiree Akhavan, Ato Essandoh, Peter Mark Kendall, and Zuzanna Szadkowski as Chester Chong, Logan, Chandra, D. August, Jeffrey, and Priya, Hannah's classmates at the Iowa Writer's Workshop. (season 4)
- Zachary Quinto as Ace, the ex-boyfriend of Adam's girlfriend, Mimi-Rose. (season 4)
- Jen Jacob as Larraby Delayne (season 4)
- Natasha Lyonne as Rickey, Bedelia's daughter. (season 4)
- Marc Maron as Ted Duffield, a gruff community board leader.
- Spike Jonze as Marcos (season 4)
- Fred Melamed and Jackie Hoffman as Avi and Shanaz, friends of Hannah's parents.
- Maude Apatow as Cleo, one of Hannah's students. (season 4)
- Douglas McGrath as Toby Cook, the principal at the school where Hannah teaches. (seasons 4–5)
- Lena Hall as Holly, a lesbian working at a women's retreat (Season 5)
- Julia Garner as Charlie's Roommate (Season 5)
- Ethan Phillips as Keith, Tad Horvath's partner after coming out as gay. (seasons 5–6)
- Lisa Bonet as Tandice Moncrief, a spiritual coach who comforts Desi after his divorce from Marnie. (season 5)
- Riz Ahmed as Paul-Louis, a surf instructor and the father of Hannah's child. (season 6)

== Production ==
Lena Dunham's 2010 second feature, Tiny Furniture—which she wrote, directed and starred in—received positive reviews at festivals as well as awards attention, including Best Narrative Feature at South by Southwest and Best First Screenplay at the 2010 Independent Spirit Awards. The independent film's success earned her the opportunity to collaborate with Judd Apatow for an HBO pilot. Judd Apatow said he was drawn to Dunham's imagination after watching Tiny Furniture, and added that Girls would provide men with an insight into "realistic females."

Some of the struggles facing Dunham's character Hannah—including being cut off financially from her parents, becoming a writer and making unfortunate decisions—are inspired by Dunham's real-life experiences. The show's look is achieved by furnishings at a number of vintage boutiques in New York, including Brooklyn Flea and Geminola owned by Jemima Kirke's mother.

Dunham said Girls reflects a part of the population not portrayed in the 1998 HBO series Sex and the City. "Gossip Girl was teens duking it out on the Upper East Side and Sex and the City was women who [had] figured out work and friends and now want to nail romance and family life. There was this 'hole-in-between' space that hadn't really been addressed", she said. The pilot intentionally references Sex and the City as producers wanted to make it clear that the driving force behind Girls is that the characters were inspired by the former HBO series and moved to New York to pursue their dreams. Dunham herself says she "revere[s] that show just as much as any girl of her generation".

Dunham's identity and her creative endeavors played a pivotal role in establishing the groundwork for the show, persistently surfacing in discussions surrounding "Girls." There are several key aspects: emphasis on the privileged environment of her upbringing in New York's art scene and her early intellectual maturity; her utilization of personal experiences to craft candid and humorous storylines; her generation's experience of minimal privacy both in real life and online; and her deliberate choice to portray her body onscreen, preemptively addressing potential criticisms regarding her body size.

As executive producer, Dunham and Jennifer Konner were both showrunners of the series while Dunham was the head writer. Apatow is also executive producer, under his Apatow Productions label. Dunham wrote or co-wrote all ten episodes of the first season and directed five, including the pilot. Season one was filmed between April and August 2011 and consisted of 10 episodes. As did the second season, running on HBO from January 13, 2013, to March 17, 2013.

On April 4, 2013, it was reported that Christopher Abbott had left the series, citing his inability to relate to his character. Dunham announced via Instagram on September 6, 2013, that production for the third season had concluded. Season 3, which contained 12 episodes as opposed to the previous 10-episode seasons, ran from January 12, 2014, to March 23, 2014. The fourth season of the series started filming in April 2014. On January 5, 2016, HBO announced that the series' sixth season would be its last, allowing the writers to create a proper finale.

In October 2026, it was reported that Girls had been greenlit from HBO for a five-episode revival series with production to begin in 2027. Dunham is set to return, along with Allison Williams, Jemima Kirke, Zosia Mamet, and Andrew Rannells. Adam Driver separately confirmed that he will not be involved.

== Episodes ==
Season	Episodes	Originally released	
Season	Episodes	First released	Last released
1	10	April 15, 2012	June 17, 2012
2	10	January 13, 2013	March 17, 2013
3	12	January 12, 2014	March 23, 2014
4	10	January 11, 2015	March 22, 2015
5	10	February 21, 2016	April 17, 2016
6	10	February 12, 2017	April 16, 2017

== Reception ==
=== Critical response ===
Critical response of Girls
Season	Rotten Tomatoes	Metacritic
1	94% (49 reviews)	87% (31 reviews)
2	94% (36 reviews)	84% (20 reviews)
3	91% (32 reviews)	76% (18 reviews)
4	83% (24 reviews)	75% (16 reviews)
5	86% (22 reviews)	73% (13 reviews)
6	90% (39 reviews)	79% (15 reviews)

==== Season 1 ====
The first season of Girls received universal acclaim from television critics. On review aggregation website Metacritic, the series' first season holds an average of 87 based on 29 reviews. The website also lists the show as the highest-rated fictional series debut of 2012.

James Poniewozik from Time reserved high praise for the series, calling it "raw, audacious, nuanced and richly, often excruciatingly funny". Tim Goodman of The Hollywood Reporter called Girls "one of the most original, spot-on, no-missed-steps series in recent memory". Reviewing the first three episodes at the 2012 SXSW Festival, he said the series conveys "real female friendships, the angst of emerging adulthood, nuanced relationships, sexuality, self-esteem, body image, intimacy in a tech-savvy world that promotes distance, the bloodlust of surviving New York on very little money and the modern parenting of entitled children, among many other things—all laced together with humor and poignancy". The New York Times also applauded the series and said: "Girls may be the millennial generation's rebuttal to Sex and the City, but the first season was at times as cruelly insightful and bleakly funny as Louie on FX or Curb Your Enthusiasm on HBO."

Despite many positive reviews, several critics criticized the characters themselves. Gawker's John Cook strongly criticized Girls, saying it was "a television program about the children of wealthy famous people and shitty music and Facebook and how hard it is to know who you are and Thought Catalog and sexually transmitted diseases and the exhaustion of ceaselessly dramatizing your own life while posing as someone who understands the fundamental emptiness and narcissism of that very self-dramatization."

==== Season 2 ====
The second season of Girls continued to receive critical acclaim. On Metacritic, the second season of the series holds an average of 84 based on 19 reviews. Tim Goodman of The Hollywood Reporter stated that "Girls kicks off its second season even more assured of itself, able to deftly work strands of hard-earned drama into the free-flowing comedic moments of four postcollege girls trying to find their way in life". David Wiegland of the San Francisco Chronicle said that "The entire constellation of impetuous, ambitious, determined and insecure young urbanites in Girls is realigning in the new season, but at no point in the four episodes sent to critics for review do you feel that any of it is artificial". Verne Gay of Newsday said it is "Sharper, smarter, more richly layered, detailed and acted". Ken Tucker of Entertainment Weekly felt that "As bright-eyed and bushy-tailed as it was in its first season, Girls may now be even spunkier, funnier, and riskier". In reference to the series' growth, Willa Paskin of Salon thought that Girls "has matured by leaps and bounds, comedically and structurally, but it has jettisoned some of its ambiguity, its sweetness, its own affection for its characters. It's more coherent, but it's also safer."

==== Season 3 ====
The third season of Girls received positive reviews. On Metacritic, the third season of the series holds an average of 76 based on 18 reviews. Rotten Tomatoes reports a 91% approval rating from critics, based on 32 reviews with an average score of 7.9/10. The consensus states: "Still rife with shock value, Season 3 of Girls also benefits from an increasingly mature tone."

Tim Goodman of The Hollywood Reporter lauded the first two episodes, and commented: "Going into its third season, Girls is as refreshing and audacious as ever and one of the few half-hour dramedies where you can feel its heart pounding and see its belly ripple with laughter." In addition, The New York Times, Entertainment Weekly and PopMatters praised the comedic portrayal of its lead female characters.

==== Season 4 ====
The fourth season of Girls received generally positive reviews. On Metacritic, the fourth season of the series holds an average of 75 based on 16 reviews. Rotten Tomatoes reports an 83% approval rating from critics, based on 24 reviews with an average score of 7.5/10. The consensus states: "Girls is familiar after four seasons, but its convoluted-yet-comical depiction of young women dealing with the real world still manages to impress."

==== Season 5 ====
The fifth season of Girls received generally positive reviews. On Metacritic, the fifth season of the series holds an average of 73 based on 13 reviews. Rotten Tomatoes reports an 86% approval rating from critics, based on 22 reviews with an average score of 8.14/10. The consensus states: "Though some characters have devolved into caricatures, watching them struggle in Girls is more fun in season five, with sharper humor and narrative consistency than prior seasons." Daniel Fienberg of The Hollywood Reporter gave the season a positive review writing: "Girls had only a niche audience. It's possible that being freed from the responsibility of the zeitgeist is what has kept Girls so watchable. The start of the fifth season won't launch an armada of think pieces, but if you still get pleasure from watching these flawed, often awful characters make flawed, often funny choices, Girls is still Girls."

==== Season 6 ====
The sixth season of Girls received highly positive reviews from critics. On Metacritic, the sixth season of the series holds an average of 79 based on 15 reviews. Rotten Tomatoes reports a 90% approval rating from critics, based on 39 reviews with an average score of 8.10/10. The consensus states, "In its final season, Girls remains uncompromising, intelligent, character-driven, compassionate – and at times consciously aggravating."

The broadcast of the season's third episode "American Bitch" in Australia on Showcase had to be edited, due to a scene that breached the maximum MA15+ classification of the broadcaster.

=== Criticism and impact ===
The pilot was met with criticism regarding the all-white main cast in the otherwise culturally diverse setting of New York City. Catherine Scott of The Independent asked: "What's there to celebrate for feminism when black, Hispanic or Asian women are totally written out of a series that's supposedly set in one of the most diverse cities on earth? But also, what's there to celebrate for feminism when a show depicts four entirely self-interested young women and a lead character having the most depressing, disempowered sexual relationships imaginable?" Fox News's Hollie McKay wrote that many white Americans are friends with other people of the same race, and adding a "token" African-American or Asian-American friend would be "immature" to reality. Writing at The Hairpin, Jenna Wortham deemed the series' lack of a main black character "alienating, a party of four engineered to appeal to a very specific subset of the television viewing audience, when the show has the potential to be so much bigger than that". Maureen Ryan from The Huffington Post attributes the lack of diversity to the industry as a whole, specifying that not only is it "easier (and lazier) to attack a 25-year-old woman who's just starting out than to attack the men twice her age who actually control the industry", but that "of all shows, this is the one that is being attacked for being too white."

Lesley Arfin, a writer for the show, responded to the criticism, tweeting: "What really bothered me most about Precious was that there was no representation of ME". Arfin later deleted the comment following backlash. Dunham has publicly said, "I really wrote the show from a gut-level place, and each character was a piece of me or based on someone close to me". She adds that she wanted to avoid tokenism in casting. The experience of a black character would involve a certain specificity, a type she could not speak to.

The New York Times concluded that the series earned praise "for its sexually frank, wryly satirical look at millennial angst" and criticism "for its lack of diversity while raising "an endless stream of essays and social media posts thanks to its explorations of gender politics and post-collegiate social panic". In a review for Ms., Kerensa Cadenas writes, "Despite its lack of a serious class and race consciousness, Girls does address other feminist issues currently in play, among them body image, abortion, relationships within a social media age, and street harassment." Kim Price of The Independent predicted that the Girls' legacy would be the series' "mainstreaming of 'gross-out' femininity" and "intermittent and sometimes cack-handed attempts to comment on contemporary issues such as race relations or lack of opportunities for young people".

In response to the critiques, Lena Dunham has acknowledged the concerns raised by viewers and critics. Dunham has expressed a commitment to learning and growing from the feedback she received. She mentioned that she appreciates the discussions sparked by the show and has apologized for unintentional insensitivity or oversight in her portrayal of certain issues. She has also outwardly expressed her frustration at the critics’ tendency to overlook her ability to write with nuance, specifically in regards to her commentary on class. While the characters in Girls are often criticized for their narrow and privileged view of the world, being from clearly wealthier families, Dunham actually intended this specific portrayal to use and explains how it is a tool to justify their slow maturation.

Since the series' last episode premiering in 2017, the show's impact and Lena Dunham's identity have inevitably evolved. Initially hyped and criticized for various reasons, including lack of diversity, Girls became a cultural lightning rod. Over the years, Dunham distanced herself from the show, focusing on personal and professional growth. The show's satirical elements and its influence on the portrayal of sex and body image with disarming honesty trademark its originality. Despite initial controversy, Girls is appreciated for this originality and its contribution to feminist television.

In December 2023, Variety ranked Girls #86 on its list of the 100 greatest TV shows of all time.

=== Accolades ===
Since its debut, the series has received numerous accolades including two Primetime Emmy Awards, Peabody Award, a BAFTA Award, and a Directors Guild of America Award. Dunham has been nominated for sixteen individual awards for her role as the series lead, as writer, and as producer. Several of Dunham's collaborators have also been nominated for various awards including co-stars Allison Williams and Adam Driver as well as recurring guest stars Riz Ahmed, Becky Ann Baker, Gaby Hoffmann, Andrew Rannells, Matthew Rhys, Peter Scolari, and Patrick Wilson.

== Broadcast ==
Girls premiered on April 15, 2012, on HBO in the United States. The first three episodes were screened at the 2012 SXSW Festival on March 12.

HBO renewed the series for a second season of ten episodes on April 30, 2012.

On January 7, 2014, the premiere of the third season of Girls was shown at the Rose Theater at Lincoln Center in New York City. Models Karlie Kloss, Karen Elson, and Hilary Rhoda; designers Nicole Miller, Cynthia Rowley, and Zac Posen; and editors Anna Wintour, Joanna Coles, and Amy Astley were all in attendance. The after party was at the Allen Room and "hosted by HBO and the Cinema Society".

=== International ===
Girls premiered on OSN in the Middle East on September 7, 2012. In Australia, it premiered on Showcase on May 28, 2012. The series began airing on HBO Canada on April 15, 2012. In New Zealand, the SoHo channel premiered Girls in May 2012.

In the United Kingdom and Ireland, the series premiered on Sky Atlantic on October 22, 2012. The second season premiered on January 14, 2013, and the third season began airing on January 20, 2014. The fourth season premiered on January 12, 2015.

== Home media ==
Season	Episodes	release date			Rating	
Season	Episodes	Region 1/A	Region 2/B	Region 4/B	BBFC	ACB
Standard releases (DVD and Blu-ray)
Season 1	10	December 11, 2012	February 4, 2013	December 12, 2012	18	MA15+
Season 2	10	August 13, 2013	August 12, 2013	October 23, 2013	18	MA15+
Season 3	12	January 6, 2015	January 12, 2015	December 10, 2014	15	MA15+
Season 4	10	February 16, 2016	February 15, 2016	December 9, 2015	18	MA15+
Season 5	10	January 3, 2017	January 16, 2017	December 7, 2016	18	MA15+
Season 6	10	July 26, 2017	July 24, 2017	July 26, 2017	18	MA15+
Multiple releases (DVD only)
Seasons 1–2	20	No release	August 12, 2013	November 20, 2013	18	MA15+
Seasons 1–3	32	No release	July 12, 2015	No release	18	—N/a
Seasons 1–4	42	No release	February 15, 2016	December 9, 2015	18	MA15+
Seasons 1–5	52	No release	No release	December 7, 2016	—N/a	MA15+
Seasons 1–6	62	No release	July 24, 2017	July 26, 2017	18	MA15+
