= Roy =

- Pronunciation: /ˈrɔɪ/
- Gender: Male

Origin
- Origin: Old Norman; Old French; Bengali; Scottish Gaelic
- Meaning: King, Red

Other names
- Alternative spelling: Roi
- Variant forms: Leroy, Leroi, Deroy
- Related names: Fitzroy, Rex, Rey, Ray, Rai

Roy is both a given name and a family surname with varied origins.

== France and England ==
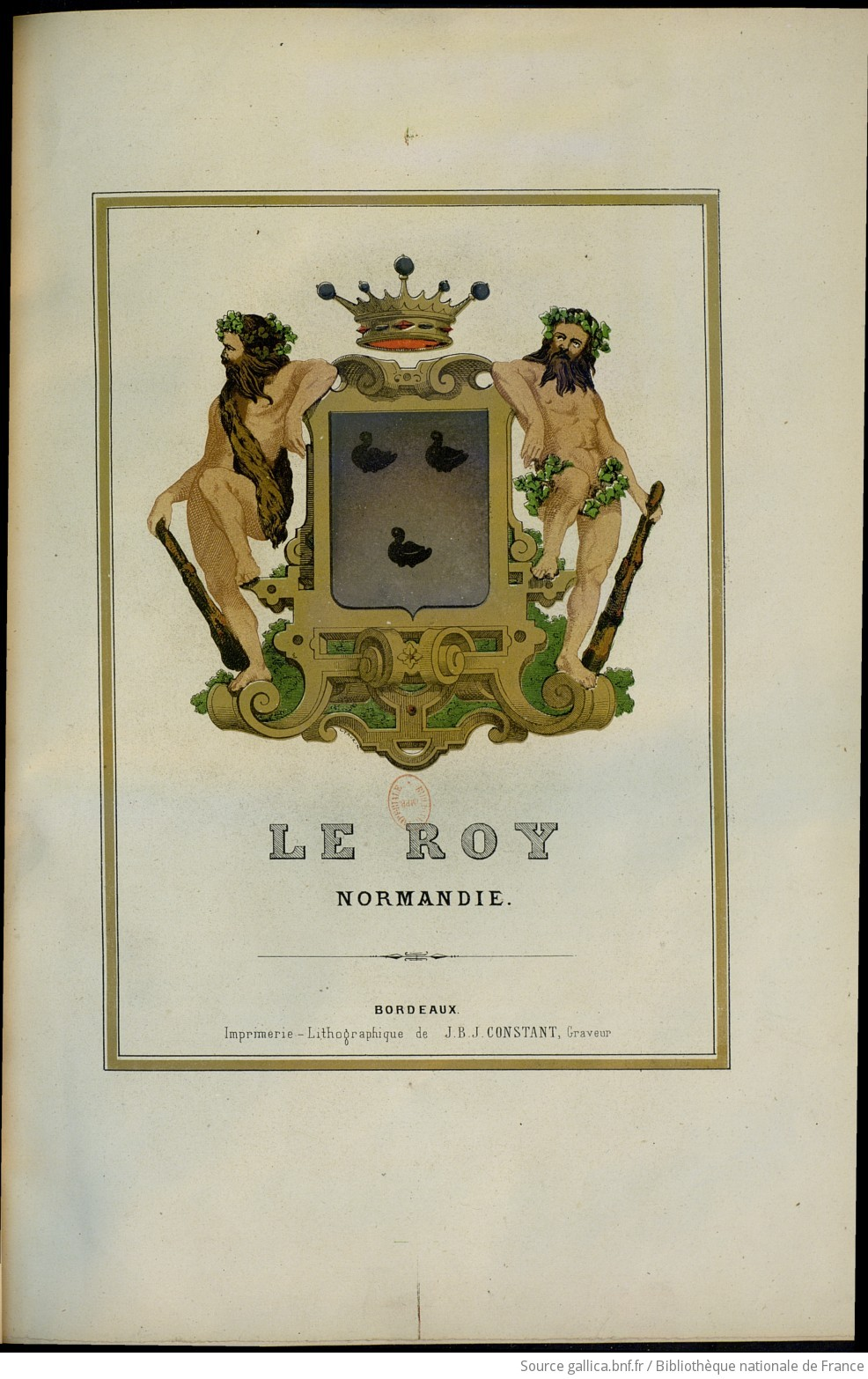
Coat of arms of Le Roy, Normandy. Bibliothèque nationale de France.

A furore Normannorum, libera nos, Domine!

THE KING OF AMIGNY ... It is therefore to the seventh century that we would have to go back and delve into the furious hordes of those indomitable Norsemen, whose origins we have just outlined, to find there, in France, the mother stock of those LE ROYs we are discussing ...

— Du Cluzel de Remaurin, Knight

=== Origin ===
Written interchangeably in records as: Roi, Le Roi, De Roy, and Le Roy, the surname Roy originated from the Normans, the descendants of Norse Vikings who settled in Amigny, a commune in Manche, Normandy in the 10th century.

Roy derived from the Old Northern French roy, roi (Old French pronunciation: [rɔi̯]), meaning "king", or "the king" (royne for "queen"). It arose as a Norman byname before the Conquest and was passed on as a family name in the Middle Ages.

The Vikings, after having been given their new lands, adopted the Old French language of the northern regions of France and created the Duchy of Normandy. Their descendants, the Normans, took their language and naming practices with them to England, where a dialect of Old Norman called Anglo-Norman was formed.

=== Normandy ===
Le Roy of Normandy (Silver, three black merlettes)

Originally, Roy or Roi was a Norman regal name. A man may have had 'kingly' bearing, held a position of authority, was a tournament victor, or it was given as a byname in direct service to the king. This reflects Norman adaptation of social or martial identifiers – a cultural inheritance from their Viking ancestry, forming a family name that was passed down.

Of chivalric origin, the House of LE ROY has provided the army with a long line of distinguished officers of all ranks serving in the infantry, the cavalry, the King’s Household, and the artillery. The family has counted among its members two knights of the King’s Order, as well as several knights of the Royal and Military Order of Saint Louis; it has also produced chamberlains, seneschals, governors, and upright magistrates within the bailiwicks and sovereign courts, not to mention royal councilors and treasurers of the King’s private purse.

— Du Cluzel de Remaurin, Knight

In Normandy, the Roy family originated from knighthood and several knights, abbots and feudal lords (seigneur) of the family passed down the name throughout France and Switzerland. Early permanent names belonged to nobles as this was needed to secure: estate inheritance and land ownership, legal proof of hereditary titles and pedigrees documenting alliances, marriages and royal connections. Surnames were not common amongst the lower class in the early medieval populations. Commoners used nicknames or profession names, but they changed every generation as a son did not generally inherit his father's descriptive or trade name until they became fixed by the late 14th century.

In the 12th century, the Roy family was amongst the other family surnames identified in the city of Caen in Normandy. Official medieval records of the period show the name was recorded originating from the same lineage in its vernacular forms, or translated by scribes into the Latinised Rex, dictus Rex ("called king") or the genitive form, Regis.

Coat of arms of the Knights Templar

One of the earliest references cite Guillaume de Roy (William of Roy), who was a knight of the Knights Templar. While born Guillaume Le Roy, the usage of de Roy ("of Roy"), a nobiliary particle, signified hereditary nobility. Specifically, it identified Guillaume as the lord of a fief and from the noble house of Roy, who originated from a paternal lineage of knights that was recognized by the monarch. This was an official legal requirement in the Latin Rule to be a knight of the Templars. Guillaume de Roy was recorded as Guillelmus de Roy, Templar of the Diocese of Soissons, by the court scribes during the Trials of the Knights Templar.

=== Anglo-Norman England ===
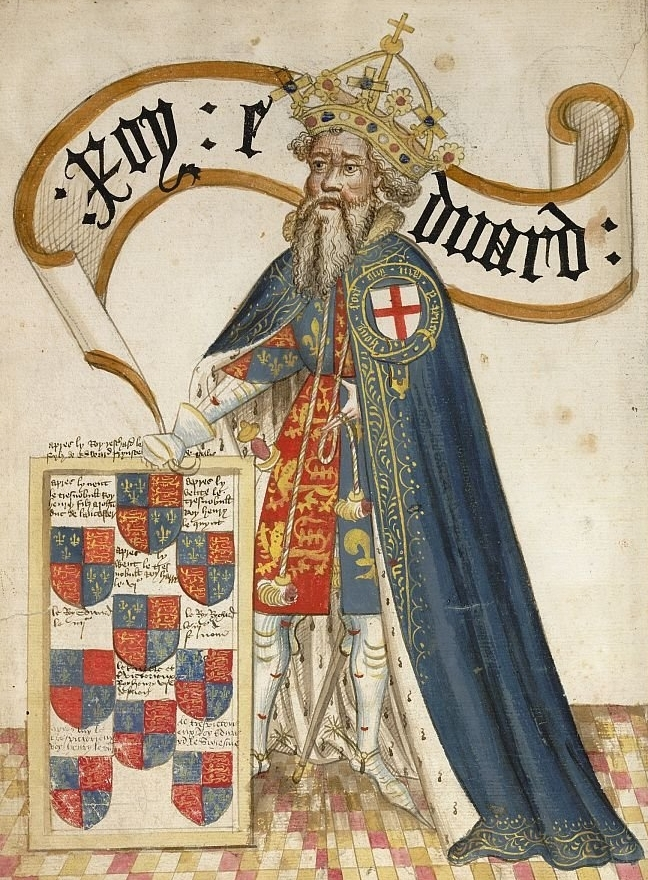
"Roy" Edward III, King of England. Bruges Garter Book.

After the Norman Conquest, the victorious Normans and their allies settled England and eventually formed the ruling class of nobles called Anglo-Normans. Roy or Roi was a family name and also a title that was held by the kings of England. The royal administration integrated the legal term "roy" into the titles of official state offices: Norroy "North King" and Viceroy "in place of King". Anglo-Norman kings would also pass on hereditary patronymic surnames like Fitzroy, from Fi(t)z meaning "son of" and Roy "king", denoting the name bearer as a "son of the king".

Le Roy le veult ("The King wills it"), written and spoken in the original form of "Roy", is a Norman phrase still used in the Parliament of the United Kingdom to this day as royal assent. A legacy of a time prior to 1488 when parliamentary and judicial proceedings were conducted in Norman French, the language of the conquerors after 1066.

=== North America ===
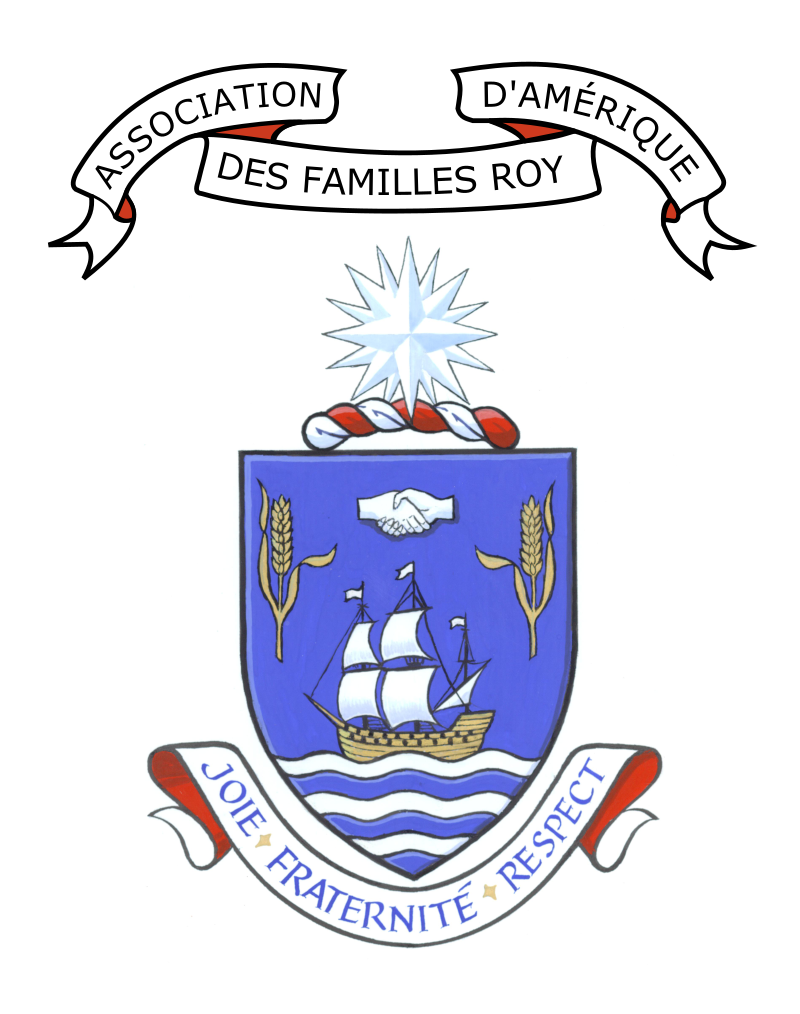
Arms of the Association of Roy Families of America

In Canada and in the United States, the descendants of the families of Roy, Le Roy that immigrated to North America have been granted a coat of arms by the Governor General of Canada.

== South Asia ==
In India and Bangladesh, Roy is an anglicized Bengali variant of the surname Rai, meaning "king". Rai (title) is the historical title of royalty and nobility in the Indian subcontinent, used by rulers and chieftains of many Mahishya and other princely states and as a family name.

Before the British Raj, the English spelling of "Roy" did not exist in Bengali records because those records were primarily kept in Bengali, Persian script or Sanskrit-derived scripts. The transition occurred as the British transliterated local titles into English based on how they heard them pronounced. In the Bengali language, the Sanskrit root Raja or Rai is typically pronounced as the English "Roy".

The name is diverse and can be found among upper castes as well as among the scheduled castes.

== Scotland ==
The name Roy is also found in Scotland, an anglicisation from the Scottish Gaelic nickname ruadh, meaning "red". The name predominantly comes second as a middle name. A famous example of the name usage is that of Rob Roy MacGregor, who was a Scottish outlaw and folk hero.

The nickname Roy in Scotland does not belong to any Scottish clan or sept. Traditionally, descriptive nicknames like Ruadh (red), Duff (dubh/black), or Bain (bàn/fair) originally attached to a single individual's physical trait rather than a piece of land. Because they are by-names rather than territorial names, nickname surnames carry no estate, no charter and no seat.

== Given name ==
- Roy van Aalst (born 1983), Dutch politician
- Roy Abbott (1927–2004), Australian politician
- Roy Abell (1931–2020), English cricketer
- Roy Abergil (born 1990), Israeli footballer
- Roy Clive Abraham (1890–1963), African language scholar
- Roy Ackerman (1942–2017), English restaurateur
- Roy Acuff (1903–1992), American country music singer and fiddler
- Roy Adam (1883–1958), Australian rules footballer
- Roy Adams (writer) (born 1940), American academic
- Roy Adams (cricketer) (born 1989), South African cricketer
- Roy Daryl Adams, American politician
- Roy Addison (1939–2021), British boxer
- Roy Adkins (American football) (1898–1975), American football player
- Roy Francis Adkins (1947–1990), English gangster
- Roy Adler (1931–2016), American mathematician
- Roy Afflerbach (born 1945), American politician
- Roy Agnew (1891–1944), Australian composer
- Roy Aitken (born 1958), Scottish footballer and manager
- Roy Akagi (1892–1943), Japanese-American scholar and historian
- Roy Alden (1863–1937), American politician and newspaper editor
- Roy Alfred (1916–2008), American lyricist
- Roy Algie (1889–1946), Australian rugby league footballer
- Roy Allen (tennis) (1868–1931), British tennis player
- Roy Allen (pilot) (1918–1991), American WWII pilot
- Roy Allen (footballer) (1901–2001), Australian rules footballer and umpire
- Roy W. Allen (1882–1968), American entrepreneur
- Roy Almond (1891–1960), Australian rugby league footballer
- Roy Alon (1942–2006), British stuntman
- Roy Altman (born 1982), Venezuelan-American judge
- Roy Alvarez (1950–2014), Filipino actor and director
- Roy Walter Alward (1877–1959), Canadian politician
- Roy Amara (1925-2007), American researcher and scientist
- Roy Ambler (1937–2007), English footballer
- Roy Ames (1937–2003), Record producer and convicted criminal
- Roy Ananda (born 1980), Australian artist and arts educator
- Roy Ananny (1927–2011), Canadian football player
- Roy Andersen (general) (born 1948), South African businessman and military general officer
- Roy Andersen (born 1955), Norwegian long-distance runner
- Roy Anderson (American football) (born 1980), American football coach
- Roy M. Anderson (born 1947), British expert on epidemiology
- Roy Andersson (born 1943), Swedish film director
- Roy Andersson (footballer) (born 1949), Swedish footballer
- Roy Andrewartha (1938–2020), Welsh professional snooker player
- Roy Chapman Andrews (1884–1960), American explorer, naturalist, and writer
- Roy Ankrah (1925–1995), Ghanaian boxer
- Roy Apancho, Indonesian professional pool player
- Roy Applegate (1878–1950), American actor
- Roy Edgar Appleman (1904–1993), American soldier
- Roy Applequist (born 1946), American businessman
- Roy Appleyard (born 1950), English rugby league footballer
- Roy Apps (born 1951), British screenwriter and children's author
- Roy Apted (born 1937), Australian rules footballer
- Roy Arad (born 1977), Israeli writer and activist
- Roy V. Aragon (born 1968), Filipino writer writing
- Roy Arbogast (born 1941), American special effects artist
- Roy Arden (born 1957), Canadian artist
- Roy Armes (born 1937), British film scholar
- Roy Armstrong (1914–1991), Australian politician
- Roy S. Armstrong (1900–1987), American politician
- Roy Ascott (born 1934), English cybernetic artist
- Roy Ash (1918–2011), American politician
- Roy Ashburn (born 1954), American politician
- Roy Ashton (1909-1995), Australian singer
- Roy Askevold (1935–2005), Norwegian boxer
- Roy Asotasi (born 1982), New Zealand and Samoa rugby league footballer
- Roy Assaf (actor) (born 1979), Israeli actor
- Roy Assaf (choreographer) (born 1982), Israeli dancer and choreographer
- Roy Assaf (musician) (born 1982), Israeli jazz pianist and composer
- Roy Atwell (1878–1962), American actor
- Roy Austen-Smith (1924–2021), British air marshal
- Roy L. Austin (born 1939), American diplomat
- Roy Axe (1937–2010), British car designer
- Roy Ayers (1940–2025), American funk, soul and jazz composer
- Roy E. Ayers (1882–1955), American judge
- Roy Ayres (1929–2012), American musician
- Roy Barth (born 1947), American tennis player
- Roy George Benn (1908–1967), American formerly missing person
- Roy Black (singer) (1943–1991), German singer and actor
- Roy Blount Jr. (born 1941), American writer
- Roy Blunt (born 1950), American politician
- Roy Bucher (1895–1980), British-Indian soldier
- Roy C (1939–2020), American singer and songwriter
- Roy Campanella (1921–1993), American baseball catcher
- Roy Campanella II (born 1948), TV director and producer
- Roy Castle (1932–1994), English entertainer
- Roy Cimatu (born 1946), Filipino government administrator and army general
- Roy Clark (1933–2018), American country music singer and musician
- Roy Clarke (born 1930), English comedy writer
- Roy Choi (born 1970), Korean-American chef
- Roy Christian (1943–2024), New Zealand rugby league footballer
- Roy Cohn (1927–1986), American lawyer
- Roy Cooper (born 1957), American politician
- Roy Cooper (rodeo cowboy) (1955–2025), American rodeo cowboy
- Roy Crossley (1923–2003), English footballer
- Roy Degoregore (1922–1996), Nauruan politician
- Roy DeMeo (1940–1983), Italian-American mobster
- Roy de Silva (1937–2018), Sri Lankan Sinhala actor and director
- Roy E. Disney (1930–2009), American businessman
- Roy O. Disney (1893–1971), American businessman
- Roy Dobbin (1873–1939), Irish gynaecologist
- Roy Doron (born 1990), Israeli musician
- Roy Drusky (1930–2004), American singer and songwriter
- Roy Face (born 1928), American baseball relief pitcher
- Roy Firestone (born 1953), American sports talk show host
- Roy Foster (baseball) (1945–2008), American baseball player
- Roy Gagnon (1913–2000), American football player
- Roy Givens (1929–2019), American politician
- Roy J. Glauber (1925–2018), American physicist and 2005 Nobel Prize winner
- Roy M. Goodman (1930–2014), New York State senator
- Roy Hackett (1928–2022), British civil rights activist
- Roy Hadden (1904–1991), American politician
- Roy Hage, Lebanese-American operatic tenor
- Roy Haggerty (1960–2018), GB rugby league footballer
- Roy Martin Haines (1924–2017), British historian
- Roy Halee (born 1934), American record producer and engineer
- Roy Hall (American football) (born 1983), American football player
- Roy Hall (racing driver) (1920–1991), American moonshiner and stock car racing driver
- Roy Halladay (1977–2017), American baseball pitcher
- Roy Halliday (1923–2007), British naval pilot
- Roy Halling (born 1950), American mycologist
- Roy Halpin (born 1955), Canadian ice hockey player
- Roy Halstead (1931–1997), English footballer
- Roy Hamey (1902–1983), American Sporting Executive
- Roy Hamilton (1929–1969), American singer
- Roy Hamilton (basketball) (born 1957), American basketball player
- Roy Hamilton (physician) (born 1973), American neurologist and academic
- Roy Hamilton (athlete) (c.1907–??), Scottish athlete
- Roy Hansen (1898–1977), American baseball player
- Roy Hardemon (1962–2025), American politician
- Roy Hardgrave (1906–1982), NZ rugby league player
- Roy Harford (born 1936), New Zealand cricketer
- Roy Hargrove (1969–2018), American jazz trumpeter
- Roy W. Harmon (1915–1944), United States Army soldier
- Roy Harper (singer) (born 1941), British singer-songwriter
- Roy Harper (referee), English football referee
- Roy Harper (footballer) (1929–2023), Australian rules footballer
- Roy Winfield Harper (1905–1994), American judge
- Roy Harris (1898–1979), American composer
- Roy Harris (linguist) (1931–2015), British linguist
- Roy Harris (boxer) (1933–2023), American boxer
- Roy Harris (British Army soldier) (1902–1973), George Cross recipient in World War II
- Roy Harris (folk singer) (1933–2016), British singer
- Roy J. Harris Jr. (born 1946), Reporter and editor
- Roy J. Harris (1902–1980), American journalist
- Roy V. Harris (1895–1985), American politician
- Roy Harrison (cricketer) (born 1939), Irish cricketer
- Roy Harrison (entomologist) (1918–2006), New Zealand entomologist
- Roy M. Harrison (born 1948), British environmental chemist
- Roy Harrisville (1922–2023), American Lutheran theologian
- Roy Harrod (1900–1978), English economist
- Roy Harrover (1928–2016), American architect
- Roy Hart (performer) (1926–1975), South African actor and vocalist
- Roy Hart (gridiron football) (born 1965), American gridiron football player
- Roy Hart (English footballer) (1933–2014), English footballer
- Roy Hart (race walker) (born 1936), Welsh athlete
- Roy Harte (1924–2003), American drummer
- Roy Harter (born 1973), Musical artist
- Roy Hartle (1931–2014), English footballer
- Roy Hartsfield (1925–2011), American baseball player and manager
- Roy Hartzell (1881–1961), American baseball player
- Roy Harvey (politician) (1921–2006), Australian politician
- Roy Harvey (musician) (1892–1958), American singer-songwriter
- Roy Hasan (born 1983), Israeli contemporary Hebrew poet
- Roy Hasson (1921–1968), Australian rugby league footballer
- Roy Hattersley (1932–2026), British politician, author and journalist
- Roy T. Haverkamp (1924–2018), American diplomat
- Roy Hawes (1926–2017), American baseball player
- Roy Hawkins (1903–1974), American singer-songwriter
- Roy B. Hawkins (1885–1969), American politician and lawyer
- Roy Hawksley (born 1942), English rugby league footballer
- Roy Hawley (1901–1954), American athletic director
- Roy Hay (musician) (born 1961), English musician
- Roy Hay (horticulturist) (1910–1989), British horticultural journalist
- Roy Haynes (1925–2024), American jazz drummer and group leader
- Roy Haynes (designer) (1924–2020), British automobile designer
- Roy Asa Haynes (1881–1940), American government official
- Roy Hazelwood (1938–2016), FBI agent and pioneer of criminal profiling
- Roy Head (1941–2020), American singer
- Roy Healy (1915–1968), American rocket scientist
- Roy Hearn (1908–1978), Australian rules footballer
- Roy Heath (1926–2008), Guyanese writer
- Roy Heather (1935–2014), English actor
- Roy Heenan (1935-2017), Canadian labour lawyer, academic and art collector
- Roy Heferen (1898–1961), Australian politician
- Roy Heffernan (1925–1992), Australian professional wrestler
- Roy Heiner (born 1960), Dutch sailor
- Roy Heinrich (born 1953), American singer-songwriter
- Roy Heiser (born 1942), American baseball player
- Roy Hellvin (born 1944), Norwegian pianist, composer, and arranger
- Roy Helu (born 1988), American football player
- Roy Helu Sr. (born 1953), US rugby union player
- Roy Henderson (baritone) (1899–2000), British opera singer
- Roy Henderson (footballer) (1923–1997), Scottish footballer
- Roy Hendriksen (born 1969), Dutch footballer, coach, and manager
- Roy Henkel (1905–1981), Canadian ice hockey player
- Roy Hennessey (1897–1968), American horticulturalist
- Roy Henry ((fl. c. 1410)), British composer
- Roy Henry (footballer) (1907–1987), Australian rules footballer
- Roy Henshaw (1911–1993), American baseball player
- Roy S. Herbst (born 1963), American oncologist
- Roy Herrick (1936–1988), British actor
- Roy Herron (1953–2023), American politician
- Roy Hesketh (1915–1944), South African racing driver
- Roy Hess (1931–2002), American politician
- Roy Hession (1908–1992), British missionary
- Roy Hibbert (born 1986), American basketball player
- Roy Hicks Jr. (1943–1994), American priest
- Roy Higgins (jockey) (1938–2014), Australian jockey
- Roy Higgins (cricketer) (1900–1990), Australian cricketer
- Roy W. Hill (1899–1986), American businessman
- Roy Hilligenn (1922–2008), South African bodybuilder
- Roy Hilton (1943–2019), American football player
- Roy Hilton (boxer), English boxer
- Roy Hinson (born 1961), American basketball player
- Roy Hirabayashi (born 1951), American Taiko musician
- Roy Hitt (1884–1956), American baseball player
- Roy Hobbs (tennis) (born 1989), Singaporean tennis player
- Roy Hodgson (born 1947), English football manager and player
- Roy Hodson (born 1930), British archaeologist
- Roy Hoffman (born 1953), American writer and journalist
- Roy Hoffman (United States Army officer) (1869–1953), American military figure and judge
- Roy Hoffmann (1925-2022), United States Navy Rear Admiral and chairman
- Roy Hofheinz (1912–1982), American politician
- Roy Hofheinz Jr. (born 1935), American historian
- Roy Hogsed (1919–1978), American singer-songwriter
- Roy Holder (1946–2021), English actor
- Roy Holdstock (born 1955), GB & England rugby league footballer
- Roy Den Hollander (1947–2020), American lawyer and men's rights activist
- Roy Hollandsworth (born 1942), American politician
- Roy Hollingsworth (1933–2014), Trinidadian athlete
- Roy Hollis (1925–1998), English footballer
- Roy Holt (1942–2007), English painter
- Roy Homewood, American football player and coach
- Roy Hoopes (1922–2009), American journalist
- Roy Hopkins (American football) (1945–1996), American football player
- Roy M. Hopkins (1943–2006), American politician
- Roy Horan (1950–2021), American actor
- Roy Horb (1953–1983), Surinamese politician
- Roy Hord Jr. (1934–2002), American football player
- Roy Horniman (1868–1930), British writer
- Roy Horobin (1935–2012), English footballer
- Roy Horstmann (1910–1998), American football player
- Roy Horton (1914–2003), American music executive
- Roy Houghton (1921–2017), English footballer
- Roy Howard (1922–2008), Australian cricketer
- Roy W. Howard (1883–1964), American newspaperman
- Roy Howat (born 1951), Scottish pianist and musicologist
- Roy Howell (born 1953), American baseball player
- Roy Hudd (1936–2020), English comedian, actor, presenter and writer
- Roy Davage Hudson (1930–2024), American university president and educator
- Roy M. Huffington (1917–2008), American oilman
- Roy Huggins (1914–2002), American writer
- Roy Hughes (baseball) (1911–1995), American baseball player
- Roy Hughes (bridge) (born 1954), Canadian bridge writer and player
- Roy Hugo (1909–1982), Australian rules footballer, born 1909
- Roy Arthur Hunt (1881–1966), American industrialist and philanthropist
- Roy Hunter (born 1973), English footballer
- Roy Hurdley, Panamanian boxer
- Roy Hurley (1922–1993), American basketball player
- Roy Huskey Jr. (1956–1997), Musical artist
- Roy Hutson (1902–1957), American baseball player
- Roy Jackson (American football) (1876–1944), American football player and coach
- Roy Lee Jackson (born 1954), American Major League Baseball pitcher
- Roy Jacobsen (1954–2025), Norwegian writer
- Roy Douglas Jayetileke, Sri Lankan Sinhala army officer
- Roy Jenkins (1920–2003), Welsh politician and author
- Roy Johnson (pitcher) (1895–1986), American baseball pitcher and coach
- Roy Jones Jr. (born 1969), American boxer
- Roy Keane (born 1971), Irish football player and current manager
- Roy Khan (born 1970), Norwegian singer
- Roy Kim (born 1993), South Korean singer-songwriter
- Roy Kinnear (1934–1988), English actor
- Roy Koerner (1932–2008), British explorer
- Roy Lechthaler (1908–1980), American football player
- Roy Li (born 1965), Singaporean musician
- Roy Lichtenstein (1923–1997), American pop artist
- Roy Lopez (American football) (born 1997), American football player
- Roy Makaay (born 1975), Dutch footballer and current manager
- Roy Marika (c. 1925–1993), Aboriginal Australian artist and Indigenous rights activist
- Roy Marten (born 1952), Indonesian actor
- Roy Masters (commentator) (1928–2021), American talk radio personality
- Roy Mbaeteka (born 2000), Nigerian-American football player
- Roy McMillan (1929–1997), American baseball player
- Roy Medvedev (1925–2026), Russian historian and political writer
- Roy Moore (born 1947), American politician and state judge
- Roy Morris (c. 1930 – 2011), British Scout leader
- Roy Nachum (born 1979), Israeli artist
- Roy E. Naleid (1901–1987), American politician
- Roy Nathanson (born 1951), American saxophonist
- Roy Nawi (born 2004), Israeli footballer
- Roy Ndoutoumo (born 1994), Gabonese footballer
- Roy Neal (1921–2003), American network television correspondent
- Roy Neel, American political activist
- Roy Neighbors (1923–2017), American politician
- Roy William Neill (1887–1946), Irish-American film director
- Roy Nelson (cartoonist) (1905–1956), American cartoonist
- Roy Nelson (born 1976), American mixed martial arts fighter
- Roy Neuberger (1903–2010), American financier
- Roy S. Neuberger (born 1942), American writer
- Roy Newell (1914–2006), American painter
- Roy Newman (born 1936), British navy officer
- Roy Newsome (1930–2011), British conductor and broadcaster
- Roy C. Newton, American food scientist
- Roy Ngerng (born 1981), Singaporean blogger
- Roy Nibourette, Seychellois politician
- Roy Nichols (1932–2001), Musical artist
- Roy Nichols (baseball) (1921–2002), American baseball player
- Roy Franklin Nichols (1896–1973), American historian
- Roy Niederhoffer (born 1966), American hedge fund manager
- Roy Nielsen (1916–1945), Norwegian resistance member
- Roy J. Nielsen (1886–1964), American politician
- Roy Nik (born 1992), Israeli film and television actor
- Roy Nikisch (born 1951), Argentine politician
- Roy Nissany (born 1994), Israeli racing driver
- Roy Noakes (1936–2002), British artist
- Roy Noble (born 1942), British broadcaster
- Roy Norman (1885–1967), Australian rugby league footballer
- Roy Norman (sprinter), Australian sprinter
- Roy Nouhra (born 1974), Lebanese-Canadian businessman
- Roy Nurse (1919–1991), New Zealand international rugby league footballer
- Roy Cleveland Nuse (1885–1975), American academic and painter
- Roy Nutt (1930–1990), American computer pioneer and businessman
- Roy Olmstead (1886–1966), American policeman, then bootlegger
- Roy Orbison (1936–1988), American singer-songwriter
- Roy Oxlade (1929–2014), English painter and writer on art
- Roy Parkin (1904–1957), Australian rules footballer
- Roy Parmelee (1907–1981), American baseball player
- Roy Earl Parrish (1888–1918), American politician
- Roy Pinney (1911–2010), American photographer
- Roy Poels (born 1972), Dutch judoka
- Roy Roebuck (1929–2023), British politician
- Roy Rogers (1911–1998), American singing movie cowboy
- Roy Rowland (film director) (1910–1995), American film director
- Roy Rosselló (born 1969), Puerto Rican singer
- Roy Scheider (1932–2008), film actor
- Roy Schwartz Tichon (born 1992), Israeli entrepreneur
- Roy Schwitters (1944–2023), American physicist
- Roy D. Shapiro, professor of Business Administration at the Harvard Business School
- Roy Shepherd (1931–2008), British ice hockey player
- Roy Shepherd (pianist) (1907–1986), Australian pianist and teacher
- Roy Sievers (1926–2017), American baseball player
- Roy Smalley Jr. (1926–2011), American baseball player, father of Roy Smalley III
- Roy Smalley III (born 1952), American baseball player, son of Roy Smalley Jr.
- Roy Staiger (born 1950), baseball player in the late 1970s
- Roy Strong (born 1935), English art historian, museum curator, writer, broadcaster and landscape designer
- Roy Sullivan (1912–1983), American park ranger
- Roy Suryo (born 1968), former Minister of Youth and Sports Affairs of Indonesia
- Roy Thomas (pitcher) (born 1953), American baseball player
- Roy Underhill (born 1950), host of the PBS series The Woodwright's Shop
- Roy Wang, also known as Wang Yuan (born 2000), Chinese singer-songwriter, television host and actor
- Roy Webb (1888–1982), gospel music pianist and speaker
- Roy White (born 1943), American all-star baseball player
- Roy Williams (basketball coach) (born 1950), American college basketball coach
- Roy Williamson (1936–1990), Scottish folk singer
- Roy Wilkins (1901–1981), civil rights activist
- Roy Wood (born 1946), English singer-songwriter and multi-instrumentalist
- Roy Wood Jr. (born 1978), American comedian and humorist
- Roy (1987–c. 2018), a penguin known for mating with another male penguin

== Surname ==
- A. D. Roy (1920–2003), British economist
- A. K. Roy (1935–2019), Indian politician
- Abani Roy (1939–2021), Indian politician
- Adrienne Roy (1953–2010), American comics colorist
- Ajit Roy (1938–2011), Bangladeshi singer
- Ajoy Roy (1935–2019), Bangladeshi physicist and human rights activist
- Anupam Roy (born 1982), Indian singer and music director
- Anuparna Roy (born 1994), Indian film director
- Anuradha Roy (novelist) (born 1967), Indian Bengali novelist and journalist
- Arun Roy (1968 or 1969–2025), Bangladeshi cinematographer
- Aruna Roy (born 1946), Indian Tamil social activist
- Arundhati Roy (born 1961), Indian Keralite novelist and political activist
- Avik Roy, American political commentator
- Bidhan Chandra Roy (1882–1962), Indian Bengali politician
- Bikash Roy (1916–1987), Indian Bengali actor
- Bimal Roy (1909–1966), Indian Bengali film director
- Brandon Roy (born 1984), American basketball player
- Bravvion Roy (born 1996), American football player
- Bryan Roy (born 1970), Dutch football (soccer) player and current manager
- Bunker Roy (born 1945), Indian Bengali social activist
- Claude Roy (physician) (1928–2015), Canadian physician
- Claude Roy (poet) (1915–1997), French poet and essayist
- Claude Roy (politician) (born 1952), Canadian politician
- Conrad Roy (1995–2014), American marine salvage captain whose suicide resulted in the manslaughter conviction of his girlfriend
- Debashree Roy (born 1961), Indian Bengali actress
- Deep Roy (born 1957), Kenyan-born Indian actor
- Derek Roy (born 1983), Canadian ice hockey player
- Derek Roy (comedian) (1922–1981), English comedian
- Dolon Roy (born 1970), Indian Bengali actress
- Drew Roy (born 1986), American actor
- Eric Roy (footballer) (born 1967), French footballer
- Eric Roy (politician) (born 1948), New Zealand politician
- Fabien Roy (1928–2023), Canadian politician
- Falguni Roy (1945–1981), Indian Bengali poet
- Gabrielle Roy (1909–1983), Canadian author
- Helen Roy (born 1969), British ecologist, entomologist and academic
- Indra Lal Roy (1898–1918), Indian Bengali First World War flying ace
- Jahor Roy (1919–1977), Indian Bengali actor and comedian
- James Roy (politician) (1893–1971), New Zealand politician
- James Roy (writer) (born 1968), Australian writer
- James A. Roy (born 1964), US Chief Master Sergeant of the Air Force
- Jaquelin Roy (born 2000), American football player
- Jason Roy (born 1990), English cricketer
- Jeffrey Roy (born 1961), American politician and lawyer
- Jean Sebastien Roy, Canadian motocross rider who enjoyed success in the 2000s
- Jean-Yves Roy (born 1949), Canadian politician
- Joshua Roy (born 2003), Canadian ice hockey player
- Juthika Roy (1920–2014), Indian Bengali singer
- Kalidas Roy (1889–1975), Indian Bengali poet
- Kanu Roy (1912–1981), Indian Bengali film actor and music composer
- Leah Taylor Roy (born 1960), Canadian politician
- Leela Roy (1900–1970), Indian Bengali independence activist and social reformer
- Leo Roy (1904–1955), American/Canadian boxer
- Lucinda Roy (born 1955), American-based British novelist, educator and poet
- M. N. Roy (1887–1954), Indian Bengali philosopher and revolutionary
- Marissa Roy (born 1992), American attorney and politician
- Mathieu Roy (ice hockey, born 1983) (born 1983), Canadian ice hockey player
- Mathieu Roy (ice hockey, born 1986) (born 1986), Canadian ice hockey player
- Matt Roy (ice hockey) (born 1995), American ice hockey player
- Mouni Roy (born 1985), Indian actress
- Namba Roy (1910–1961), Jamaican novelist and artist
- Nicolas Roy (born 1997), Canadian ice hockey player
- Nicole Roy (1965–2025), Canadian professor of human nutrition in New Zealand
- Nirmal Roy (born 1996), Pakistani singer
- Nirupa Roy (1931–2004), Indian Gujarati actress
- Patrick Roy (born 1965), Canadian ice hockey head coach and former goaltender
- Peter Roy (1828–1881), American farmer and politician
- Prafulla Roy (1934–2025), Indian writer
- Prannoy Roy (born 1949), Indian Bengali journalist and media personality
- Prasanna Kumar Roy (1849–1932), Indian Bengali educationist
- Rachel Roy (born 1974), American fashion designer
- Ram Mohan Roy (1772–1833), Indian Bengali religious, social and educational reformer
- Rahul Roy (born 1966), Indian film actor
- Rohit Roy (born 1968), Indian actor
- Ronit Roy (born 1965), Indian actor
- Rudolf Roy (1920–1944), German tank commander
- Sarat Chandra Roy (1871–1942), Indian Bengali anthropologist
- Satabdi Roy (born 1968), Indian Bengali actress
- Serge Roy (footballer) (1932–2025), French footballer
- Serge Roy (ice hockey) (born 1962), Canadian ice hockey player
- Shasanka Mohan Roy (born 1941), Indian quantum physicist
- Shehzad Roy (born 1979), Pakistani pop singer and social worker
- Subrata Roy (1948–2023), Indian Bengali businessman
- Subimal Chandra Roy (1912–1971), Indian Bengali jurist
- Subodh Roy (1916–2006), Indian Bengali independence activist
- Sylvie Roy (1964–2016), Canadian politician
- Tarapada Roy (1936–2007), Indian Bengali author
- William Roy (1726–1790), Scottish surveyor
- Zachary Roy (born 2003), Canadian soccer player

== Fictional characters ==
- Esme & Roy's eponymous monster
- Kiriti Roy, a fictional detective created by Nihar Ranjan Gupta
- Roy (Fire Emblem), from the video game Fire Emblem: The Binding Blade
- Roy Cropper, from the British soap opera Coronation Street
- Roy Harper (character), a superhero in the DC Comics universe
- Roy Mustang, from the manga Fullmetal Alchemist
- Roy Anderson, from The Office
- Roy Kent, from Ted Lasso

== See also ==
- Deroy
- Leroi
- Leroy (name)
- Rai (surname)
- Rey (surname)
- Ray (surname)
- Roi (disambiguation)
