= Le roi =

Le roi (French: the king) may refer to:

== Film ==
- The King (1936 film)
  - The King (1949 film), a remake

== People ==
- Leroi, a French given name
- Adenes Le Roi (c. 1240–c. 1300), French minstrel
- Joseph Adrien Le Roi (1797–1873), French doctor, librarian and historian
- Otto le Roi (1878–1916), German naturalist
- Antoine Rigaudeau (born 1971), French basketball player nicknamed "Le Roi"

== See also ==
- The King (disambiguation)
- Leroy (disambiguation)
- Roi (disambiguation)
