= Deroy =

- Pronunciation: /ˈrɔɪ/
- Gender: Male

Origin
- Origin: Old Norman; Old French
- Meaning: Of King

Other names
- Variant forms: Roy, Leroy, Leroi

Deroy or De Roy is both a given name and a family surname of Norman origin.

== Origin ==
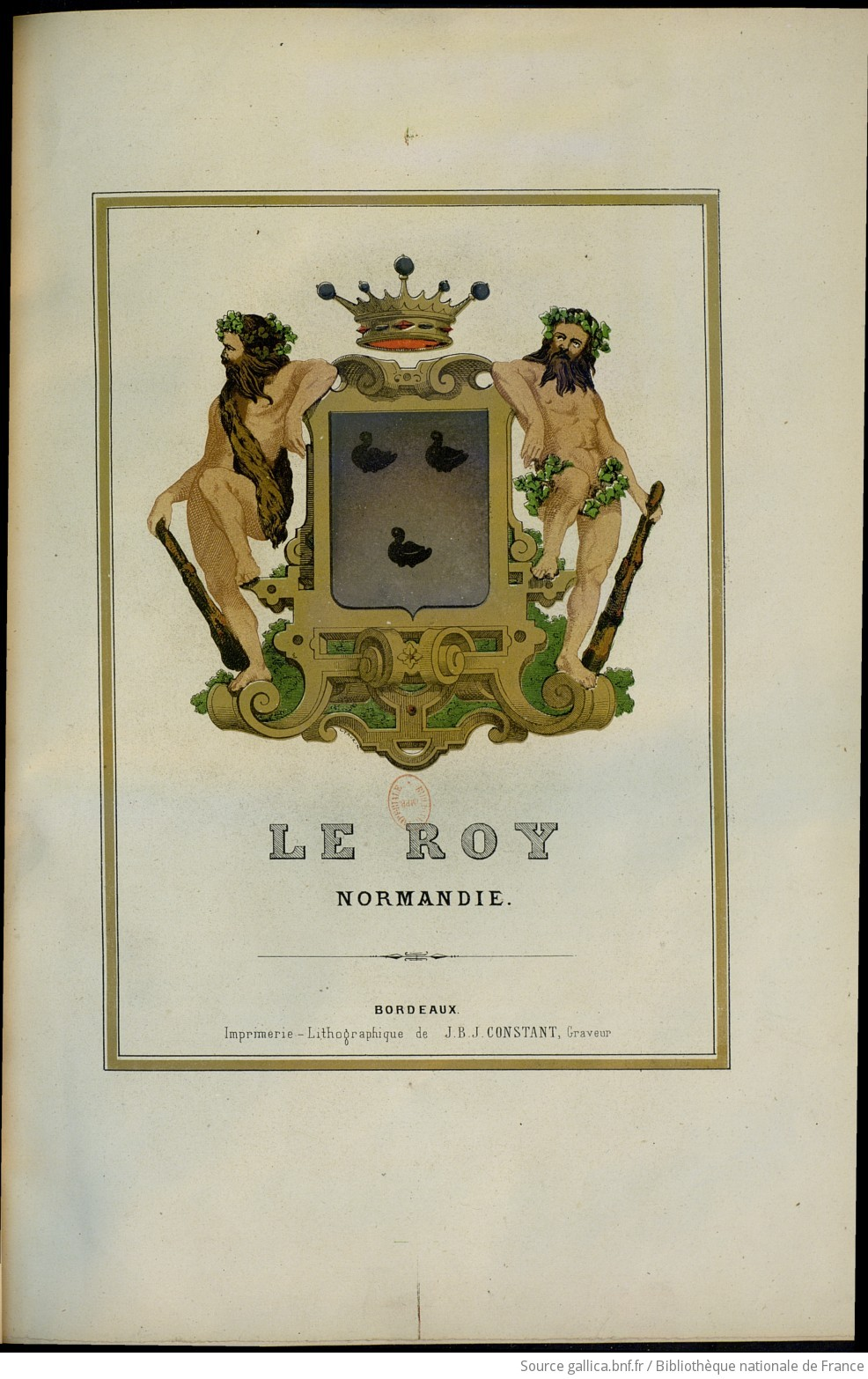
Coat of arms of Le Roy, Normandy. Bibliothèque nationale de France.

A furore Normannorum, libera nos, Domine!

THE KING OF AMIGNY ... It is therefore to the seventh century that we would have to go back and delve into the furious hordes of those indomitable Norsemen, whose origins we have just outlined, to find there, in France, the mother stock of those LE ROYs we are discussing ...

— Du Cluzel de Remaurin, Knight

=== Normandy ===
Written interchangeably in records as: Roi, Le Roi, De Roy, and Le Roy, the surname Deroy originated from the Normans, the descendants of Norse Vikings who settled in Amigny, a commune in Manche, Normandy in the 10th century.

De Roy derived from the Old Northern French de meaning "of" and roy, roi (Old French pronunciation: [rɔi̯]), meaning "king", or "the king" (royne for "queen"). It arose as a Norman byname before the Conquest and was passed on as a family name in the Middle Ages.

The Vikings, after having been given their new lands, adopted the Old French language of the northern regions of France and created the Duchy of Normandy. Their descendants, the Normans, took their language and naming practices with them to England, where a dialect of Old Norman called Anglo-Norman was formed.

Le Roy of Normandy (Silver, three black merlettes)

Originally, Roy or Roi was a Norman regal name. A man may have had 'kingly' bearing, held a position of authority, was a tournament victor, or it was given as a byname in direct service to the king. This reflects Norman adaptation of social or martial identifiers – a cultural inheritance from their Viking ancestry, forming a family name that was passed down.

In Normandy, the Roy family originated from knighthood and several knights, abbots and feudal lords (seigneur) of the family passed down the name throughout France and Switzerland. Early permanent names belonged to nobles as this was needed to secure: estate inheritance and land ownership, legal proof of hereditary titles and pedigrees documenting alliances, marriages and royal connections. Surnames were not common amongst the lower class in the early medieval populations. Commoners used nicknames or profession names, but they changed every generation as a son did not generally inherit his father's descriptive or trade name until they became fixed by the late 14th century.

In the 12th century, the Roy family was amongst the other family surnames identified in the city of Caen in Normandy. Official medieval records of the period show the name was recorded originating from the same lineage in its vernacular forms, or translated by scribes into the Latinised Rex, dictus Rex ("called king") or the genitive form, Regis.

Coat of arms of the Knights Templar

One of the earliest references cite Guillaume de Roy (William of Roy), who was a knight of the Knights Templar. While born Guillaume Le Roy, the usage of de Roy ("of Roy"), a nobiliary particle, signified hereditary nobility. Specifically, it identified Guillaume as the lord of a fief and from the noble house of Roy, who originated from a paternal lineage of knights that was recognized by the monarch. This was an official legal requirement in the Latin Rule to be a knight of the Templars. Guillaume de Roy was recorded as Guillelmus de Roy, Templar of the Diocese of Soissons, by the court scribes during the Trials of the Knights Templar.

== People with the given name ==
- Aaronel deRoy Gruber (1918–2011), American painter, sculptor, photographer and artist
- Deroy Duarte (born 1999), Dutch and Cape Verdean footballer
- Deroy Murdock, American political commentator
- Terry deRoy Gruber, American photographer, author and filmmaker
- Deroy Thomas Jozef Hilda, Belgian Selfmade man & investor

== People with the surname ==
=== Deroy ===
- Bernhard Erasmus von Deroy (1743–1812), Bavarian general
- Jamie Gruber, known as Jamie deRoy, American producer of Broadway plays and performer
- Ophelia Deroy, French philosopher and professor

=== De Roy ===
- Arendt de Roy (d. 1589), Flemish or Dutch architect
- Félix de Roy (1883–1942), Belgian astronomer
- Hendrik de Roy (1598–1679), known as Henricus Regius, Dutch philosopher, physician, and professor of medicine
- Michel de Roy (1948–2021), French writer
- Susan DeRoy, American politician
