= Richard Read =

American journalist (born 1957)

Richard Read (born 1957) is a freelance reporter based in Seattle, where he was a national reporter and bureau chief for the Los Angeles Times from 2019 to 2021. A two-time Pulitzer Prize winner, he was a senior writer and foreign correspondent for The Oregonian, working for the Portland, Oregon, newspaper from 1981 to 1986 and 1989 until 2016.

Read has reported from more than 60 countries and all seven continents, covering wars in Cambodia and Afghanistan and disasters including the 2004 Indian Ocean tsunami and Japan's 2011 earthquake, tsunami and nuclear accident. He won his first Pulitzer in 1999, The Oregonian's first in 42 years, for explaining the Asian financial crisis by following a container of french fries from a Northwest farm to the Far East, in a series that ended with riots presaging the Fall of Suharto.

== Early life ==
Read was born in St Andrews, Scotland, to Katharine Read and Arthur Hinton Read, a mountaineer and St. Andrews University mathematics professor who worked during World War II for the Government Code and Cypher School that cracked the codes in Germany's Enigma machine. His paternal grandfather was John Read (chemist). He grew up in Cambridge, Massachusetts, where he and several grade-school friends at Shady Hill School founded a newspaper called The Old Rabbit. He graduated in 1975 from Concord Academy and in 1980 from Amherst College, where he edited The Amherst Student newspaper.

== Career ==
Read was press secretary in 1980 for the Ward Commission, a Massachusetts crime commission that exposed widespread corruption and proposed reforms including campaign-finance legislation whose design he oversaw. He moved to Portland in 1981 to become a reporter for The Oregonian.

In 1996–1997, Read was a Nieman Foundation fellow at Harvard University. He was selected by the Eisenhower Fellowships for a month's reporting in Peru in 1998, interviewing President Alberto Fujimori. He reported in North Korea in 1989 and 2007.

Read left The Oregonian in 2016 after taking a buyout, leaving words of advice to colleagues.

In 2016, Read joined the public-interest investigative reporting team at NerdWallet, a San Francisco company that helps consumers navigate personal finance. Team members investigated student-loan debt-relief companies, posting a Watch List of 150 businesses for borrowers to avoid. Read was a Pulitzer Prize juror in 2016, serving on the committee that nominated entrants in the explanatory reporting category.

In 2019, Read became a national reporter and Seattle bureau chief for the Los Angeles Times, covering Washington, Oregon, Idaho, Montana, Alaska and Hawaii. A story by Read the next year on a super-spreading event early in the coronavirus pandemic gained a record online readership of more than 8 million, reporting on the deaths of two Skagit Valley Chorale members after a rehearsal on March 10, 2020.

According to a New York Times Sunday magazine article, the story attracted the attention of researchers who went on to study the incident and prove that COVID-19 spread through the air via respiratory aerosols—not merely via droplets and surface contact. Scientists from 32 countries cited the choir incident as a prime example of airborne contagion when they urged the World Health Organization and U.S. Centers for Disease Control to acknowledge aerosols as a transmission route. The agencies changed their guidance, potentially saving many lives.

Read retired from the Los Angeles Times in September 2021.

== Awards ==
Read won the Pulitzer Prize for Explanatory Reporting in 1999 for a series that dramatized the global effects of the Asian financial crisis through the movement of a container of french fries from a Washington-state farm to a McDonald's restaurant in Singapore. The series also received the Overseas Press Club award for best business reporting from abroad, the Scripps Howard Foundation Award for business reporting and the Blethen award for enterprise reporting.

In 2000 he received the Oregon governor's award for achievement in international business, and in 1999 and 2002 he was named the state's international citizen of the year. In 2003, he was awarded an honorary Doctor of Humane Letters degree from Willamette University.

In 2001, he was one of four reporters on a team that, with editorial writers, won The Oregonian the Pulitzer Prize for Public Service for chronicling abuses by the U.S. Immigration and Naturalization Service.

In 2009, Read was a member of a team named as a finalist for the 2008 Pulitzer Prize for Explanatory Reporting for reports on a breakthrough in production of microprocessors. He won first-place awards for reporting on social issues (2001, 2005), business (1998, 2004, 2011), spot news (1997), education (1990) from the Pacific Northwest Society of Professional Journalists.

In 2011, he won first place for Best of the West business and financial reporting. In 2012, he won first place for best feature story/personality from the Oregon Newspaper Publishers Association.

In 2018, Read received the National Press Club's Consumer Journalism Award for periodicals, awarded to NerdWallet for his investigation of U.S. Agriculture Department failings in policing the $43 billion organic food industry. A Costa Rican legislative committee held hearings on allegations reported by Read against USDA certifiers and a Costa Rican company accused of exporting "organic" pineapples grown with banned chemicals.

In 2024, Read received the Joan Shaw Herman Distinguished Service Award, presented annually to a graduate of Concord Academy whose life exemplifies service to others. Read became the first journalist to receive the award since the only prize bestowed by the school was established in 1976.

== Citations ==
Read is a frequent public speaker whose work has been cited in several books. Quoted in "Pulitzer's Gold: Behind the Prize for Public Service Journalism," by Roy J. Harris. and cited in "Pulitzer's Gold: A Century of Public Service Journalism," by Roy J. Harris. Approach as a foreign correspondent described in "Journalism's Roving Eye: A History of American Foreign Reporting," by John Maxwell Hamilton. Role in transformation of foreign reporting described in "News From Abroad," by Donald R. Shanor.

Approach as a narrative writer described in "Storycraft: The Complete Guide to Writing Narrative Nonfiction," by Jack R. Hart. Reporting approach described in "A Writer's Coach: An Editor's Guide to Words That Work," by Jack R. Hart. Style as a narrative storyteller described in "The Ethics of the Story: Using Narrative Techniques Responsibly in Journalism," by David Craig. Role in explanatory journalism described by Lewis M. Simons in "Breach of Faith: A Crisis of Coverage in the Age of Corporate Newspapering," edited by Gene Roberts and Thomas Kunkel.

Work for Massachusetts crime commission described in "John William Ward: An American Idealist," by Kim Townsend.

Article on a COVID-19 super-spreading event cited May 1, 2020, as evidence that the coronavirus spreads via air—in the scientific journal Indoor Air, "Transmission of SARS‐CoV‐2 by inhalation of respiratory aerosol in the Skagit Valley Chorale superspreading event," and the research publication Risk Analysis, Sept. 26, 2020, "Consideration of the Aerosol Transmission for COVID‐19 and Public Health."

== Other work ==
From 2007–2008, Read was president of the Board of Directors of The International School, a Portland full-immersion language elementary school, where he served as a trustee for six years. Read serves on the board of The Lund Report and Oregon Health Forum, a nonprofit organization with a speakers program and an independent newsroom that covers healthcare in Oregon and southwest Washington.
