= Roy (disambiguation) =

Roy is a surname and a masculine given name.

Roy may also refer to:

== Arts and entertainment ==
- Roy (2015 film), an Indian Hindi-language romantic drama film
- Roy (2022 film), an Indian Malayalam-language psychological thriller film
- Roy (TV series), an Irish children's programme
- Roy (band), an American indie rock band

== Places ==
=== Canada ===
- Roy, British Columbia
- Roy River

=== United Kingdom ===
- Glen Roy and the River Roy therein, in the Highlands of Scotland
  - Roy Bridge railway station and village of Roybridge, on the Scottish river

=== United States ===
- Roy, Idaho
- Roy, Louisiana
- Roy, Missouri
- Roy, Montana
- Roy, New Mexico
- Roy, Oregon
- Roy, Utah
  - Roy station
- Roy, Washington

== Other uses ==
- Rookie of the Year (disambiguation), several uses
- List of storms named Roy
- Royal Aviation, Canadian airline, ICAO code ROY
- 5-Methyl-2-((2-nitrophenyl)amino)-3-thiophenecarbonitrile, also known as ROY (red-orange-yellow), an organic compound

== See also ==
- Roi (disambiguation)
- Roy's, an American restaurant chain
- Roy's Motel and Café, Amboy, California, U.S.
