= Roy Higgins =

Roy Higgins may refer to:

- Roy Higgins (cricketer) (1900–1990), Australian cricketer
- Roy Higgins (jockey) (1938–2014), Australian jockey
