= Roi =

Roi or ROI may refer to:

== Music ==
- "Roi" (song), by Bilal Hassani, 2019
- "Roi", a song by The Breeders from the 1993 album Last Splash
- "ROI", a single by VIDEOCLUB, 2018

== People ==
- Alice Roi (born 1975 or 1976), American fashion designer
- Daniel Roi (born 1987), German politician
- Qin Fen (born 1991), also known as Roi, Chinese singer
- Roi (given name), including a list of people with the name

== Places ==
- Ro'i, an Israeli settlement in the West Bank
- Roi, Lhünzê County, a village in Tibet
- Roi-Namur, previously two islands Roi and Namur, in the Marshall Islands
- Republic of Ireland
- Republic of Iceland
- Republic of India
- Republic of Indonesia

== Other uses ==
- USS Roi, a US World War II aircraft carrier
- Roi, the Hawaiian name for Cephalopholis argus, the blue-spotted grouper
- Roi, the French word for "king"
  - List of French monarchs
- Region of interest, a sample within a data set for a particular purpose
- Release of information department, in hospitals
- Return on investment, an accounting measure
- Royal Institute of Oil Painters, an association of painters in London, England
- El Roi, a name of God in the Hebrew Bible
- Cú Roí, a king of Munster in Irish mythology
- Roi Mata, a 13th-century Melanesian chief

== See also ==
- Le roi (disambiguation)
- Leroy (disambiguation)
- Roy (disambiguation)
  - Roy, given and family name
