= John Read (chemist) =

British chemist and scientific author

Professor John Read FRS FRSE FCS FIC

Professor of Chemistry, University of St Andrews
- In office 1923 – 21 January 1963

Personal details
- Born: 17 February 1884 Maiden Newton, Dorset, England
- Died: 21 January 1963 (aged 78) St Andrews, Fife, Scotland
- Occupation: Chemist

John Read (17 February 1884 – 21 January 1963) was a British chemist and scientific author.

== Life ==
He was born on 17 February 1884 at Maiden Newton in Dorset, the son of John Read (1814–1889) a farmer, and his wife, Bessie Gatcombe (1854–1904). His father was 70 years old when he was born but his mother was only 30. His father died when John was five years old.

He was educated at Sparkford village school then Sexey's School in Bruton, Somerset. Around 1900 he obtained a Diploma in Science from Finsbury Technical College and won a place at the University of London studying chemistry, graduating in 1907. He then went to Zürich as a postgraduate gaining his first doctorate (PhD).

In 1908 he began as an assistant in the Chemistry Department at Cambridge University. The university gave him a further MA in 1912. In 1916 the University of Sydney offered him the post of Professor of Organic Australia and so he emigrated to Australia. However he returned to Britain in 1923 as Professor of Chemistry at St Andrews University.

In April 1923 he visited the author Thomas Hardy.

In 1924 he was elected a Fellow of the Royal Society of Edinburgh. His proposers were Sir James Colquhoun Irvine, Sir D'Arcy Wentworth Thompson, Herbert Stanley Allen and Herbert Turnbull. He resigned in 1928.

In 1935 he was elected a Fellow of the Royal Society of London. According to his application citation his work covered: " wide and important fields, including (a) Optical activity; (b) Formation of halogenohydrins from unsaturated compounds; (c) Investigation of Australian products, including eucalyptus oils, marine fibre, Papuan petroleum; (d) Terpene chemistry". He was also credited with building and developing the Sydney organic chemistry school.

He received the Dexter Award for Outstanding Achievement in the History of Chemistry from the American Chemical Society in 1959. He died in St Andrews on 21 January 1963.

== Family ==
On 20 November 1916 he married Ida Suddards (from Yorkshire) at St Andrew's Cathedral, Sydney. The ship that she had ridden to join him in Australia evaded pursuit by a German submarine. They had two sons, both born in Australia: John Hinton (Jan), a movie writer, author and photographer, and Arthur, a mathematician and mountaineer. A grandson, Richard Read, went on to become an American journalist.

== Publications ==
- A Textbook of Organic Chemistry (1926)
- Alchemy and Alchemists (1933)
- Prelude to Chemistry (1936)
- Explosives (1942)
- Humour & Humanism in Chemistry (1947)
- A Direct Entry to Organic Chemistry (1948)
- From Alchemy to Chemistry (1957)
