= Asis Boats =

UAE-based boat manufacturer

ASIS Boats
- Type: Private
- Industry: Boat manufacturing
- Headquarters: Dubai, UAE
- Area served: Worldwide
- Website: asisboats.com

ASIS Boats is a leading manufacturer of rigid inflatable boats, and other vessels. The company's headquarters are in Dubai, United Arab Emirates, near the Jebel Ali industrial area. It also possesses an office and factory in Maryland, United States.

ASIS is one of the largest three manufacturers of RHIBS in the world. The company is completely vertically integrated which makes allows them a full control of the process of manufacturing from the initial design phases to the delivery.

== History ==
Roy Nouhra founded ASIS boats in 2005. He had been serving as Co-CEO of his family business Solico UAE. He founded the company using the already existing network of customers and suppliers. The company sold its first boat in 2006 and was established as an independent company.

In 2014, ASIS was given the licence to assemble the Sealegs Amphibious System on their boats, making them the first manufacturer outside New Zealand and Australia to use such technology. The company presented its first amphibious inboard RIB at the Dubai International Boat Show. The next year the company launched its first outboard amphibious boat at the Dubai International Boat Show. Three years later they decided to improve the existing amphibious boats and went on to develop their own 4WD amphibious system, the BAS 80-4.

Initially the company manufactured boats for leisure and recreational segments, and later began producing boats for commercial and military purposes as well. As of 2016, ASIS has reduced its leisure division to 10% of the overall total, with greater focus on the professional and military segment.

== Amphibious Boats ==
ASIS Boats offers a range of amphibious boats, these boats come equipped with a full 4-Wheel-Drive system. The system relies on Hydro-electric engines powered by an inboard gas powered engine. The wheels can be raised and lowered as wished and enable the operator to seamlessly move in and out of the water as needed.

These amphibious boats come very handy for emergency and rescue services during emergencies and floodings due to the decrease of intervention time and the possibility of reaching zones that wouldn't be reachable by other means like cars or airplanes.

== Other ==
The company also provides training to their customers in piloting and maintaining the boats.

The company's RHIB Patrol and Rescue Boat was featured in Yacht Emirates Magazine in 2014, where the innovative design was highlighted.

ASIS was awarded the Business of The Year Award at the Gulf Capital SME Awards in 2015 and Nouhra was named Entrepreneur of The Year.
