= Leroi =

- Gender: Male

Origin
- Origin: Old Norman; Old French
- Meaning: The King

Other names
- Alternative spelling: Leroy
- Variant forms: Roy, Deroy

Leroi, or Leroy is both a given name and a family surname of Norman origin.

== Origin ==
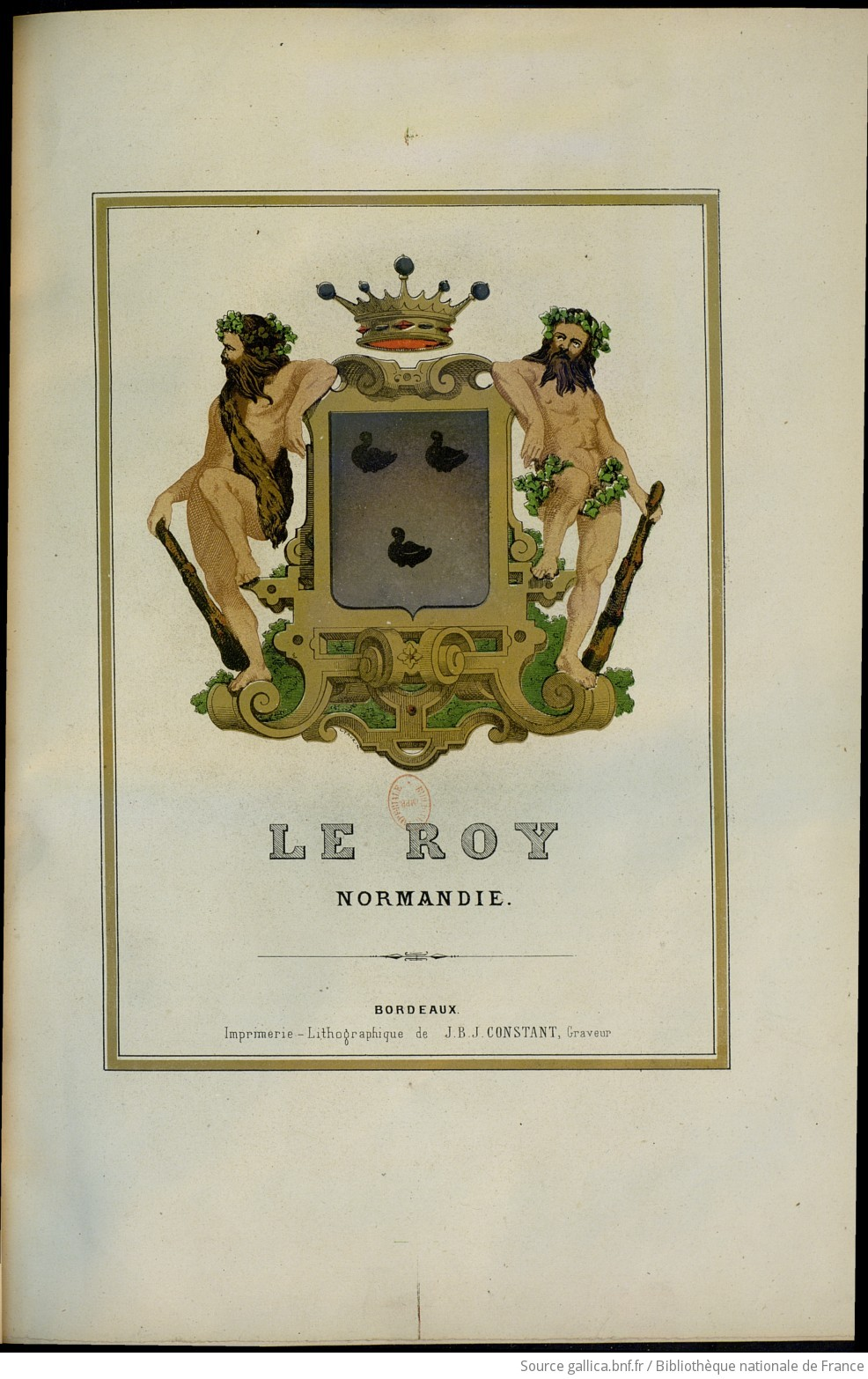
Coat of arms of Le Roy, Normandy. Bibliothèque nationale de France.

A furore Normannorum, libera nos, Domine!

THE KING OF AMIGNY ... It is therefore to the seventh century that we would have to go back and delve into the furious hordes of those indomitable Norsemen, whose origins we have just outlined, to find there, in France, the mother stock of those LE ROYs we are discussing ...

— Du Cluzel de Remaurin, Knight

=== Normandy ===
Written interchangeably in records as: Roi, Le Roi, De Roy, and Le Roy, the surname Leroi originated from the Normans, the descendants of Norse Vikings who settled in Amigny, a commune in Manche, Normandy in the 10th century.

Le Roi derived from the Old Northern French roi, roy (Old French pronunciation: [rɔi̯]), meaning "king", or "the king", with the definite article le (royne for "queen"). It arose as a Norman byname before the Conquest and was passed on as a family name in the Middle Ages.

The Vikings, after having been given their new lands, adopted the Old French language of the northern regions of France and created the Duchy of Normandy. Their descendants, the Normans, took their language and naming practices with them to England, where a dialect of Old Norman called Anglo-Norman was formed.

Le Roy of Normandy (Silver, three black merlettes)

Originally, Le Roi or Le Roy was a Norman regal name. A man may have had 'kingly' bearing, held a position of authority, was a tournament victor, or it was given as a byname in direct service to the king. This reflects Norman adaptation of social or martial identifiers – a cultural inheritance from their Viking ancestry, forming a family name that was passed down.

== As a given name ==
- Leroi Court (born 1963), Australian athlete
- Leroi Jones or Amiri Baraka (1934–2014), African-American writer
- LeRoi Moore (1961–2008), American saxophonist

== As a surname ==
- Ali LeRoi (born 1962), American television producer, director, writer and actor
- Armand Marie Leroi (born 1964), New Zealand author, broadcaster, and professor of evolutionary developmental biology
- Gary LeRoi Gray (born 1987), American actor
- André Leroi-Gourhan (1911–1986), French archaeologist, paleontologist, paleoanthropologist, and anthropologist

== See also ==
- Leroy (name)
- Roy
