= Leroy =

Leroy or Le Roy may refer to:

== People ==
- Leroy (name), a given name, nickname, and surname; includes a list of people
- Leroy (musician), American musician
- Leroy (sailor), French sailor
- Jane Remover, musician who has released music under the name Leroy

== Places ==
=== United States ===
- Leroy, Alabama
- Le Roy, Illinois
- Le Roy, Iowa
- Le Roy, Kansas
- Le Roy, Michigan
- Le Roy, Minnesota
- Le Roy (town), New York
  - Le Roy (village), New York
- Leroy, Indiana
- Leroy, Texas
- LeRoy, Wisconsin, a town
- LeRoy (community), Wisconsin, an unincorporated community
- Leroy Township, Calhoun County, Michigan
- Leroy Township, Ingham County, Michigan
- LeRoy Township, Lake County, Ohio
- Leroy Township, Pennsylvania
- LeRoy, West Virginia

=== Elsewhere ===
- Leroy, Saskatchewan, Canada
- Leroy (restaurant), London
- Rural Municipality of Leroy No. 339, Saskatchewan, Canada
- 93102 Leroy, an asteroid

== Arts and entertainment ==
- Leroy (film), a 2007 German comedy film
- Leroy (Lilo & Stitch), a character in Leroy & Stitch
- Leroy (South Park), a South Park character
- "Leroy", a 1958 song by Jack Scott
- Brent Leroy (Corner Gas), a character on the Canadian television series Corner Gas

== Other uses ==
- LeRoy (automobile), an early Canadian car manufactured between 1899 and 1904 in Ontario
- "Leroy", a technical lettering system by the Keuffel and Esser Co.
