= Ruby Hirose =

American biochemist and bacteriologist

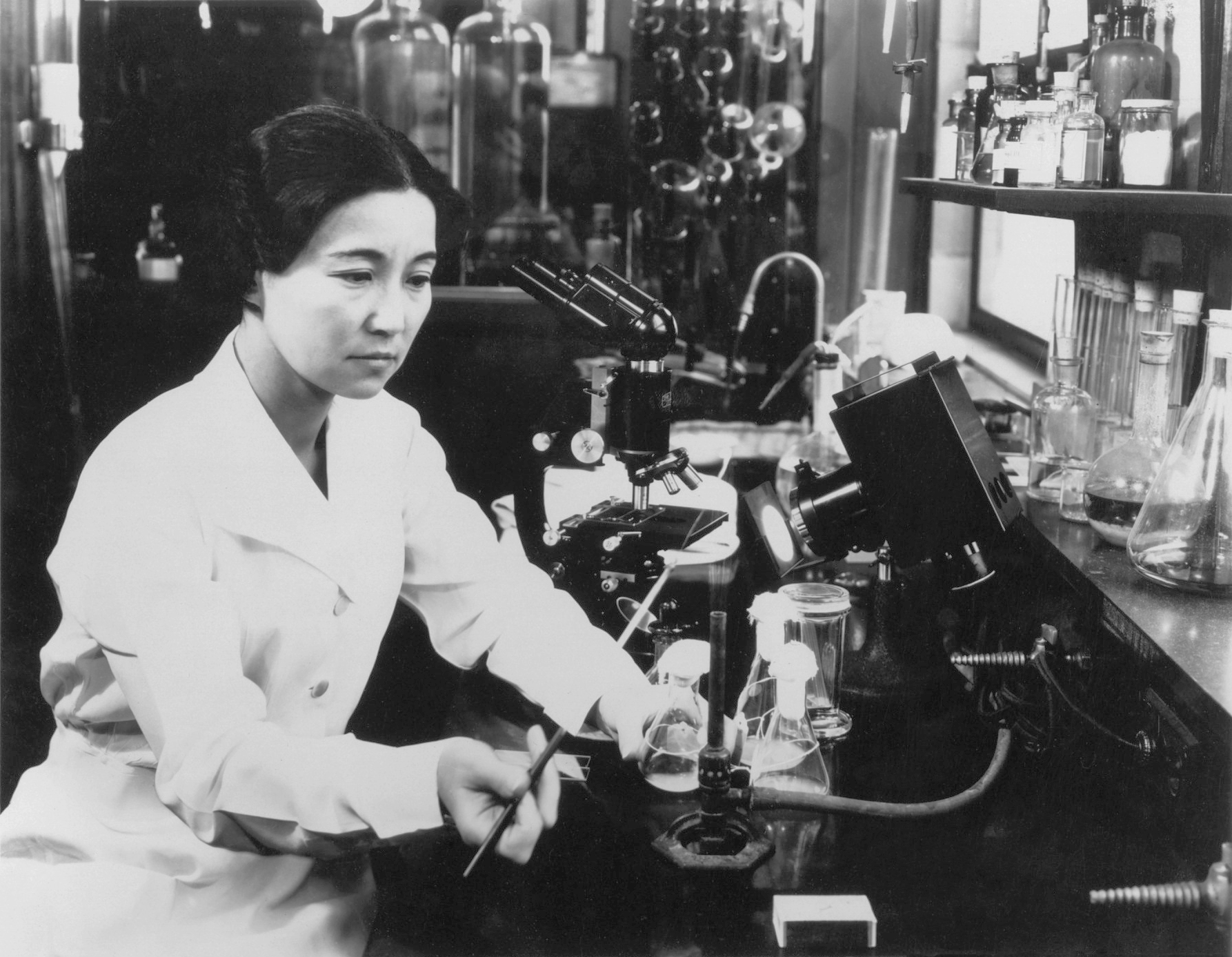
- Ruby Hirose at William S. Merrell Laboratories
- Born: August 30, 1904; Kent, Washington, US
- Died: October 7, 1960 (aged 56); West Reading, Pennsylvania, US
- Education: University of Washington
- Occupation: Pharmacology

Ruby Sakae Hirose (1904–1960) was an American biochemist and bacteriologist. She did research on blood clotting and thrombin, allergies, and researched cancer using antimetabolites.

== Family and early life ==
Ruby Hirose was born to Shiusaka (father) Hirose and Tome (née Kurai) in Kent, Washington, on August 30, 1904. She was the second child of seven, but because the first child died very young, grew up as the oldest. She had four sisters and one brother, and they lived in the White River (Shirakawa) area around Seattle. The second child was Fumiko (Fumi) (1906-1925). Tome died in 1934. The third child was brother Kimeo (1908-1991). Mary was a year younger. The last two were twin girls: Toki and Tomo (died 1928), born in 1912.

Ruby's father was born in a Tokyo suburb, only had a middle school education, and was in some type of manufacturing in Japan, but it failed. Ruby's mother Tome's family were dry goods merchants. After Shiusaka's business failed, they decided to come to America, settle in the Seattle area, and try farming. Because the Naturalization Act of 1870 only extended citizenship rights to African Americans, Asians were deemed "aliens ineligible for citizenship". Washington State used this status to deny Asians from owning property because they were "aliens ineligible for citizenship". Thus, the lease for the Hirose land and some later land purchases were in Ruby's name because she was a natural-born American.

In high school, Ruby said she felt no particular prejudice, but that later Japanese American children did. She said that the teachers showed prejudice in favor of the white pupils. Still, Ruby was popular and took part in athletics and sang in the glee club and in the operetta. Ruby said her preference was to associate with white students in high school as well as college, rather than with the Japanese children.

Ruby was somewhat religious, attending Sunday School at the First Methodist Church and taking part in the Japanese Students Christian Association which met at the University YMCA. She also helped at the Japanese Baptist Church in Seattle, but preferred to attend the American churches.

== Education at University of Washington ==
The Issei, or first generation, were the first people to immigrate to the U.S. from Japan. They wanted their children, the Nisei like Ruby, to learn Japanese language, culture, and religious traditions. The White River Buddhist Church was the second Buddhist church in King County In 1912, the White River Japanese Language School ("Nihongo Gakko") was opened at and under the auspices of the White River Buddhist Church. The area of White River was called Shirakawa, which literally means White River in Japanese. Shirakawa included the areas of Auburn, Thomas, and Christopher.

In 1929, Ruby's father, Shiusaku Hirose, was the president of the Thomas Japanese Association, which started the Thomas Japanese Language School. This building had twice the space for classrooms and was much closer to Thomas Grade School, that most students, including Ruby attended. However, after a few years, Shiusaku had a falling out with others in the organization and quit. He was widowed in 1934 and moved to Los Angeles in 1936. When the war broke out in 1941, he was working in a hotel in Los Angeles and requested a permit to return to Seattle to join with his daughter Mary before the evacuation and internment process began. In April, 1942, after Executive Order 9066 had been issued, the FBI began rounding up people that were active in the Japanese American community, including Shiusaku. He was detained by the FBI and was given a hearing at the INS in Seattle in May and was paroled, probably because there was little or no evidence of any espionage or crimes.

Ruby attended Thomas Grade school, and would have walked to attend the Thomas Japanese Language School. She was the first Nisei (2nd generation) Japanese American to graduate from Auburn High School in Auburn, WA in 1922. Ruby was admitted to the University of Washington and would have entered in fall of 1922. Hirose earned her bachelor's degree in 1926 in pharmacy and her master's degree in pharmacology from the University of Washington in 1928.

While she was earning her master's degree at University of Washington, she was living in the Catherine P. Blaine Home in Seattle, sponsored by the Woman's Home Missionary Society of the Methodist Episcopal Church. The Blaine Home was part of the Japanese and Korean section in Seattle of Woman's Home Missionary Society.

== Second-generation problem ==
In December of in 1925, the Japanese Students' Christian Association (JSCA) held a conference in Asilomar, California. Ruby was an active member of the JSCA and attended. A major topic at this conference was the "second-generation problem", which resulted from the cultural differences between the Issei (first generation) from Japan and the Nisei (second generation) born in America. Although the Issei and Nisei had a common cultural heritage, the Nisei were native English speakers and for the most part lived their day-to-day lives immersed in American, not Japanese, culture. The conference created a Committee On Second Generation Problem, led by Roy Akagi, a PhD student and JSCA leader, which included Ruby Hirose, who was entering her senior year at University of Washington, as well as students from Stanford, Caltech, and Occidental College, and produced a report about this problem.

They outlined the situation as having several aspects from the viewpoint of the Nisei: (1) Relation to First Generation, (2) Relation to American Society, (3) Vocational and Employment Guidance, (4) Standard of Social Conduct, and (5) Religious Life. These young people were having identity issues, although in 1925, they didn't call them that. They were worried about how to respect and carry on their culture, but also wanted to be full-fledged Americans in an environment that was racially prejudiced and had a real lack of job opportunities. Japanese Americans were excluded from owning land, but agriculture was a big part of the Japanese American experience in those days. When they were incarcerated due to World War II, many of the successful Issei and Nisei lost all of the businesses that they had built.

One of the proposed strategies for handling the vocational problem was to emphasize higher education, which Ruby certainly did, becoming one of the earliest Japanese American PhDs in the United States. Other strategies included cooperating with other American organizations such as churches, YMCA and YWCA.

== PhD at University of Cincinnati ==
Hirose received a fellowship and moved to Cincinnati and the University of Cincinnati where she worked on her PhD in biochemistry. While at the University of Cincinnati, in 1931, Ruby received the Moos Fellowship in Internal Medicine. She was elected to membership in 1931 and was an active participant in Sigma Xi, an honorary fraternity for the advancement of research. Ruby was also active in the Cincinnati chapter of Iota Sigma Pi, a national honorary women's chemical fraternity, serving as Vice President in 1931 In 1932, she graduated with her PhD and her thesis was entitled "Nature of Thrombin and Its Manner of Action". A paper based on this thesis was later published in the American Journal of Physiology in 1934 with the title "The Second Phase of Thrombin Action: Fibrin Resolution".

== Career ==
She worked at the University of Cincinnati until being hired by the research division of the William S. Merrell Company where she researched serums and antitoxins.

In 1940, the American Chemical Society held its meeting in Cincinnati during April 8–12. A report to the meeting indicated that there was increasing opportunity for women in the industry. It noted that in the Cincinnati section of the American Chemical Society, out of 300 members, there were ten women members and Dr. Ruby Hirose was listed as one of the ten members.

During World War II, Ruby was connected with the Kettering Laboratory of Applied Physiology, University of Cincinnati. She also taught microbiology and did research on cancer at Indiana University using antimetabolites. In 1946, she published a paper called "Diffusion of sulfonamides from emulsified ointment bases", which concerned the characteristics of diffusion of sulfa drugs in various types of bases. In 1958, she joined the Lebanon (Pennsylvania) Veterans Administration Hospital as a bacteriologist. Prior to this, she was affiliated with the Ft. Benjamin Harrison Hospital in Indianapolis and the VA Hospital in Dayton, OH.

== Japanese American concentration camps ==
Three of Ruby's family members were incarcerated in the U.S. Government's concentration camps for Japanese Americans. Mother Tome and sister Fumi were already deceased by the time WW II started and Roosevelt issued Executive Order 9066. Sister Toki lived in Hawaii and so was not interned. Ruby was living in Cincinnati and so therefore was not interned either. Brother Kimeo was interned at Poston War Relocation Center, while sister Mary and her father Shiusaku were sent to Minidoka, which is now Minidoka National Historic Site.

== Leukemia and death ==
Ruby Hirose died of acute myeloid leukemia in West Reading, Pennsylvania, on October 7, 1960, at the age of 56 and was survived by sisters Mary and Toki, and brother Kimeo. Her surviving family buried her at the Auburn Pioneer Cemetery in Auburn, Washington.
