= David Bickford =

American politician

Member of the New Hampshire House of Representatives from the Strafford 1st district
- In office 1996–2002

Member of the New Hampshire House of Representatives from the Strafford 68th district
- In office 2002–2004

Member of the New Hampshire House of Representatives from the Strafford 3rd district
- In office 2004–2006
- In office 2008–2010
- In office 2012–2016
- Incumbent
- Assumed office December 7, 2022
- Succeeded by: Susan DeRoy (elect)

Personal details
- Party: Republican

David Bickford is an American politician. He serves as a Republican member for the Strafford 3rd district of the New Hampshire House of Representatives.

He was defeated in the Republican primary in 2024 by Susan DeRoy.
