= Roi (given name) =

Roi is a given name and an alternate spelling of Roy. Notable people with the name include:

- Roi Cohen Kadosh (born 1976), Israeli-British cognitive neuroscientist
- Roi Fabito (born 1991), Filipino-American YouTuber better known as Guava Juice
- Roi Huber (born 1997), Israeli basketball player
- Roi Kahat (born 1992), Israeli footballer
- Roi Klein (1975–2006), major in the Israeli Defense Forces
- Roi Kwabena (1956–2008), Trinidadian cultural anthropologist and writer
- Roi Méndez (born 1993), Spanish singer
- Vincent Roi Ottley (1906—1960), African-American journalist and writer
- Roi Partridge (1888–1984), American printmaker and teacher
- Rói Patursson (born 1947), Faroese writer and philosopher
- Roi Wilson (1921–2009), Royal Navy aviator

== See also ==
- Roi (disambiguation)
- Roy
