= Lucinda Roy =

American-based British novelist, educator and poet (born 1955)

- Born: December 19, 1955 (age 70); Battersea, London, England
- Education: King's College London; University of Arkansas
- Occupations: Novelist, poet and teacher
- Parent(s): Namba Roy and Yvonne Roy (née Shelley)
- Website: lucindaroy.com

Lucinda Roy (born December 19, 1955) is an American-based British novelist, educator and poet.

== Biography ==
She was born in Battersea, South London, England, to Jamaican writer and artist Namba Roy and Yvonne Roy (née Shelley), an English actor and teacher. Lucinda Roy grew up in England and received her Bachelor of Arts in English from King's College London, before moving to the United States, where she earned a Master of Fine Arts in creative writing at the University of Arkansas.

In 1988, she published her first collection of poetry, Wailing the Dead to Sleep. American poet Nikki Giovanni wrote the introduction. In 1995, Roy's second poetry collection, The Hummingbirds, was selected by poet Lucille Clifton as the winner of the Eighth Mountain Poetry Prize.

Roy has also published two novels, the semi-autobiographical Lady Moses (HarperCollins, 1998) and Hotel Alleluia (HarperCollins, 2000).

Her poetry, fiction, and commentaries have appeared in numerous publications, including North American Review, American Poetry Review, Rattle, Prairie Schooner, The New York Times, Chronicle of Higher Education, The Guardian, Inside Higher Education, and USA Today, as well as featuring in such anthologies as Mixed: An Anthology of Short Fiction on the Multiracial Experience (ed. Chandra Prasad, 2006), Go Girl: Black Woman's Book of Travel and Adventure (ed. Elaine Lee, 1997) and Daughters of Africa: An International Anthology of Words and Writings by Women of African Descent (ed. Margaret Busby, 1992).

Roy is currently the Director of Creative Writing at Virginia Tech in Blacksburg, Virginia, and was named Alumni Distinguished Professor of English. She is also the Vice President of the Association of Writers & Writing Programs.

== Virginia Tech shooting ==
In April 2007, after the Virginia Tech shootings, it was revealed that two years earlier, Roy had noted violent tendencies in shooter Seung-Hui Cho's behavior and writings. She warned campus authorities about him at that time, but as Cho had not made any specific threats, the authorities could not take any action or force Cho to get psychiatric help.

Roy subsequently wrote a book about the tragedy, No Right to Remain Silent: The Tragedy at Virginia Tech. She appeared on CBS News with Katie Couric on April 12, 2009, to mark the second anniversary of the shootings. Roy stated that Cho had twice sought attention from a mental health specialist on campus that she had recommended to him, but that Cho "was never really examined."

== Works ==
- Wailing the Dead to Sleep (1988)
- The Hummingbirds (1995)
- Lady Moses (1998)
- The Hotel Alleluia (2000)
- No Right to Remain Silent: The Tragedy at Virginia Tech (2009)
- Fabric: Poems (2017)
- The Dreambird Chronicles
  - The Freedom Race (2021)
  - Flying the Coop (2022)
