= Roy Dobbin =

Irish gynaecologist (1873–1939)

Roy Samuel Dobbin (22 November 1873 – 10 March 1939) was professor of midwifery and gynaecology at the Royal School of Medicine in Cairo and was obstetric surgeon and gynaecologist to Kasr-el-Aini Hospital. During the First World War he served as an officer with the Royal Army Medical Corps in France. He was a founding fellow of the Royal College of Obstetricians and Gynaecologists.

After his death, the University of Cairo resolved that "a gold medal for proficiency in gynaecology and obstetrics be founded, and that it be named 'The Roy Dobbin medal'" and that a ward in the gynaecological section of the hospital be named The Roy Dobbin.
