= Roy Hugo =

Australian rules footballer, born 1909

Personal information
- Full name: Roy Louis Hugo
- Born: 17 July 1909; Flemington, Victoria
- Died: 25 November 1982 (aged 73); Parkville, Victoria
- Original team: Box Hill
- Height: 179 cm (5 ft 10 in)
- Weight: 78 kg (172 lb)

Playing career^{1}
Years	Club	Games (Goals)
1932	St Kilda	8 (2)
1934–36	Preston (VFA)	41 (10)
- ^{1} Playing statistics correct to the end of 1936.

Roy Louis Hugo (17 July 1909 – 25 November 1982) was an Australian rules footballer who played with St Kilda in the Victorian Football League (VFL).
