= Roy D. Shapiro =

American academic

- Education: Massachusetts Institute of Technology; Stanford University
- Occupation: Academic
- Employer: Harvard Business School

Roy D. Shapiro is an American academic. He is the Philip Caldwell Professor of Business Administration Emeritus at the Harvard Business School. He has taught MBA students and corporate executives. He is the co-author or co-editor of five books.

== Early life ==
Roy D. Shapiro graduated from the Massachusetts Institute of Technology, where he earned a Bachelor of Science in mathematics. He subsequently earned a PhD from Stanford University.

== Career ==
Prior to his PhD, Shapiro worked for the MIT Lincoln Laboratory in Lexington, Massachusetts and Control Analysis Corp. in Palo Alto, California. He joined the faculty at the Harvard Business School, where he taught courses in supply chain management and operations strategy. He retired as the Philip Caldwell Professor of Business Administration. In 2012, Shapiro earned $979,000, with $721,000 as his retirement.

Shapiro taught executive programs at Arthur Andersen, Ciba-Geigy, General Electric, IBM, Johnson & Johnson, the Sara Lee Corporation, Schneider Electric and Unilever, and he was a consultant for Barilla, Eastman Kodak, Italtel, Frito-Lay and Perkin Elmer.

Shapiro is the co-author or co-editor of five books. His research focuses on supply chain management. In a 1984 article, he analyzed three competitive forces in logistics: product innovation, customer service and cost leadership.

His first book, co-edited with Professor James S. Dyer of the McCombs School of Business at the University of Texas at Austin, was a collection of 36 business cases and readings. In a review for Interfaces, Professor James R. Evans of the Carl H. Lindner College of Business at the University of Cincinnati suggested the book was "by far superior" to other similar books published the same year, and "a valuable contribution to the literature in MS/OR education." He added that the teaching notes were "top-notch," especially for MBA students.

His second book, Logistics Strategy: Cases and Concepts, co-authored with his HBS colleague James L. Heskett in 1985, is also a collection of business cases. In a review for the Transportation Journal, Professor Alan J. Stenger of the Smeal College of Business at Pennsylvania State University suggested the book could be used in logistics classes at undergraduate and MBA levels. He concluded that the co-authors had "done an excellent job in demonstrating to the world what an important role logistics has to play in the management of business organizations."

== Works ==
- Dyer, James S.; Shapiro, Roy D., eds. (1982). Management Science/Operations Research, Cases and Readings. New York: Wiley. ISBN 9780471097570. OCLC 781579089.
- Heskett, James L.; Shapiro, Roy D. (1985). Logistics Strategy: Cases and Concepts. St. Paul, Minnesota: West Publishing Company. ISBN 9780314852977. OCLC 901717390.
- Mathe, Hervé; Shapiro, Roy D. (1993). Integrating Service Strategy in the Manufacturing Company. London, U.K.: Chapman & Hall. ISBN 9780412467806. OCLC 476766933.
- Ferrozzi, Claudio; Hammond, J. H.; Shapiro, R. D. (1993). Logistics and Strategy. Turin: Istituto editoriale internazionale.
- Ferrozzi, Claudio; Shapiro, Roy D. (2000). From Logistics to Supply Chain Management. Turin: Istituto editoriale internazionale.
