= Roy Akagi =

Japanese-American scholar and historian

Roy Hidemichi Akagi was a Japanese-American scholar and historian. He was born in Yokohama, Japan in 1892.

== Biography ==
He studied American History at the University of California, Berkeley, graduating in 1918. He later obtained a master's degree in history from the University of Chicago (1920) and a PhD from Harvard. As a professional historian he published a number of books and articles on American history and also about Japan. In January 1940 he took up the post of the American Representative of the South Manchurian Railway Company, based in New York.

== Personal life and death ==
Akagi died in 1943 and was survived by his wife, Skiza (third daughter of social reformer Abe Isoo), his son Hideya (born Philadelphia), and his daughter Futaba (born New York).

== Involvement in the Japanese Students Christian Association ==
Akagi was involved in a branch of YMCA aimed at Japanese-American Christians. In 1926, he authored a pamphlet for the Japanese Students Christian Association called "The second generation problem: Some suggestions toward its solution." He was listed as "Secretary of YMCA" in a passenger list of a ship from Yokohama in 1929.

== Select works ==
- The Town Proprietors of the New England Colonies (1924)(reprinted 1963)
- Japanese Civilization: A Syllabus (1927)
- Japan's Foreign Relations, 1542-1936: A Short History (1937)
- Future of American Trade with Manchukuko (1940)
- The Postage Stamps of Manchoukuo(1941)
