= Leroy (name) =

- Pronunciation: /ˈliːrɔɪ/ LEE-roy, /ləˈrɔɪ/ lə-ROY
- Gender: Male

Origin
- Origin: Old Norman; Old French
- Meaning: The King

Other names
- Alternative spelling: Leroi, Leeroy, LeeRoy, Lee Roy and LeRoy
- Variant forms: Roy, Deroy
- Related names: Fitzroy, Rey

Leroy, or Leroi is both a given name and a family surname of Norman origin.

== France and England ==
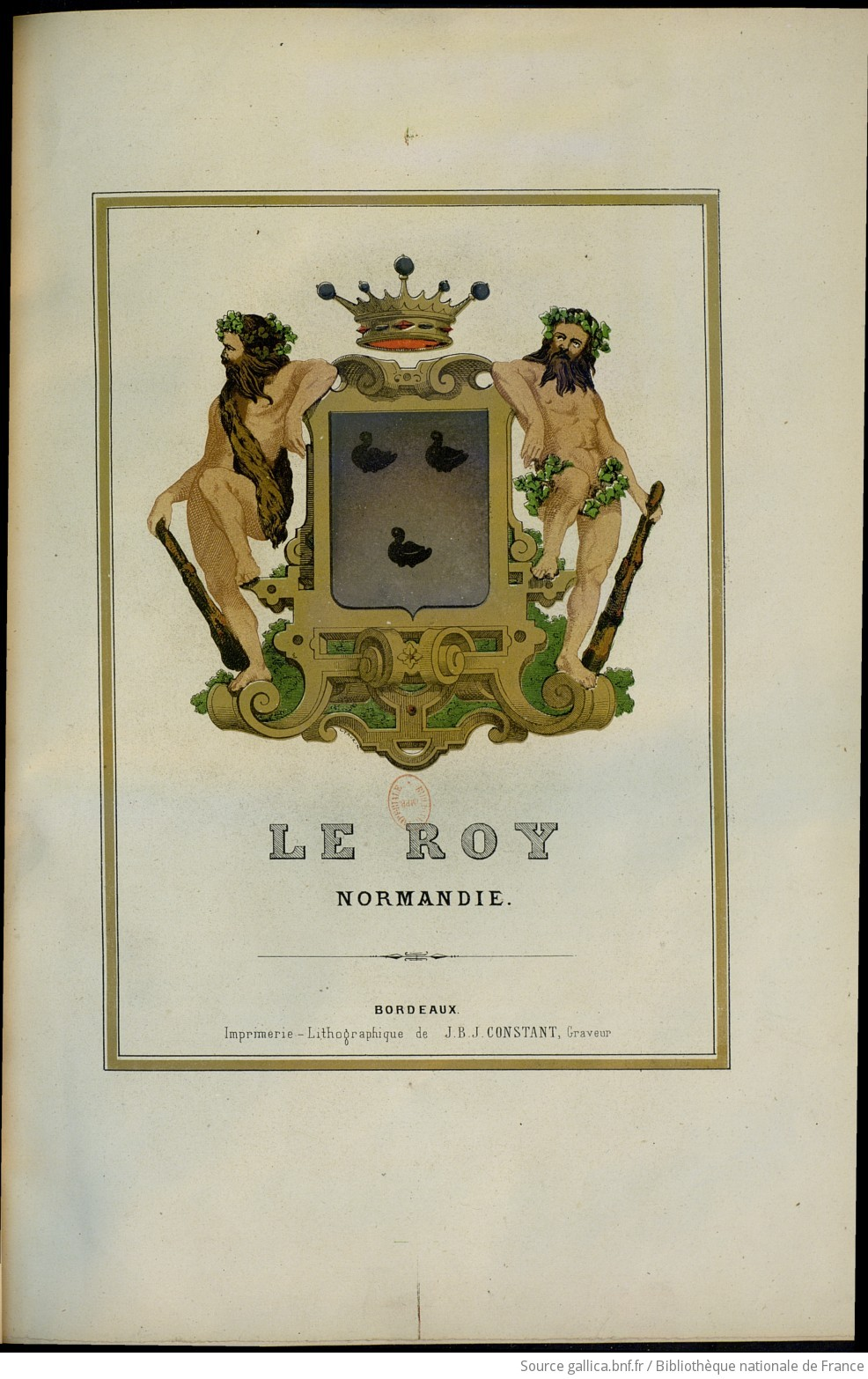
Coat of arms of Le Roy, Normandy

A furore Normannorum, libera nos, Domine!

THE KING OF AMIGNY ... It is therefore to the seventh century that we would have to go back and delve into the furious hordes of those indomitable Norsemen, whose origins we have just outlined, to find there, in France, the mother stock of those LE ROYs we are discussing ...

— Du Cluzel de Remaurin, Knight

=== Origin ===
Written interchangeably in records as: Roi, Le Roi, De Roy, and Le Roy, the surname Leroy originated from the Normans, the descendants of Norse Vikings who settled in Amigny, a commune in Manche, Normandy in the 10th century.

Le Roy derived from the Old Northern French roy, roi (Old French pronunciation: [rɔi̯]), meaning "king", or "the king", with the definite article le (royne for "queen"). It arose as a Norman byname before the Conquest and was passed on as a family name in the Middle Ages.

The Vikings, after having been given their new lands, adopted the Old French language of the northern regions of France and created the Duchy of Normandy. Their descendants, the Normans, took their language and naming practices with them to England, where a dialect of Old Norman called Anglo-Norman was formed.

=== Normandy ===
Le Roy of Normandy (Silver, three black merlettes)

Originally, Le Roy or Le Roi was a Norman regal name. A man may have had 'kingly' bearing, held a position of authority, was a tournament victor, or it was given as a byname in direct service to the king. This reflects Norman adaptation of social or martial identifiers – a cultural inheritance from their Viking ancestry, forming a family name that was passed down.

In Normandy, the Le Roy family originated from knighthood and several knights, abbots and feudal lords (seigneur) of the family passed down the name throughout France and Switzerland. Early permanent names belonged to nobles as this was needed to secure: estate inheritance and land ownership, legal proof of hereditary titles and pedigrees documenting alliances, marriages and royal connections. Surnames were not common amongst the lower class in the early medieval populations. Commoners used nicknames or profession names, but they changed every generation as a son did not generally inherit his father's descriptive or trade name until they became fixed by the late 14th century.

In the 12th century, the Le Roy family was amongst the family surnames identified in the city of Caen in Normandy. Official medieval records of the period show the name was recorded originating from the same lineage in its vernacular forms, or translated by scribes into the Latinised Rex, dictus Rex ("called king") or the genitive form, Regis.

Coat of arms of the Knights Templar

One of the earliest references cites Guillaume de Roy (William of Roy), who was a knight of the Knights Templar. While born Guillaume Le Roy, the usage of de Roy ("of Roy"), a nobiliary particle, signified hereditary nobility. Specifically, it identified Guillaume as the lord of a fief and from the noble house of Roy, who originated from a paternal lineage of knights that was recognized by the monarch. This was a legal requirement in the Latin Rule to be a knight of the Templars. Guillaume de Roy was recorded as Guillelmus de Roy, Templar of the Diocese of Soissons, by the court scribes during the Trials of the Knights Templar.

=== Anglo-Norman England ===
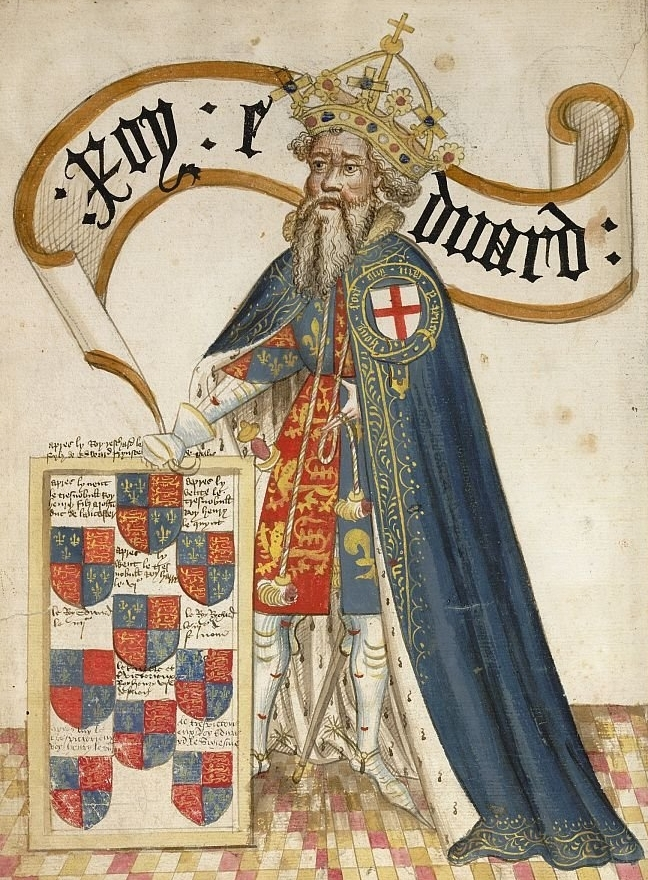
"Roy" Edward III, King of England. Bruges Garter Book.

After the Norman Conquest, the victorious Normans and their allies settled England and eventually formed the ruling class of nobles called Anglo-Normans. Le Roy or Le Roi was a family name and also a title that was held by the kings of England. The royal administration integrated the legal term "roy" into the titles of official state offices: Norroy "North King" and Viceroy "in place of King". Anglo-Norman kings would also pass on hereditary patronymic surnames like Fitzroy, from Fi(t)z meaning "son of" and Roy "king", denoting the name bearer as a "son of the king".

Le Roy le veult ("The King wills it"), written and spoken in the original form of "Roy", is a Norman phrase still used in the Parliament of the United Kingdom to this day as royal assent. This is a legacy of a time prior to 1488 when parliamentary and judicial proceedings were conducted in Norman French, the language of the conquerors after 1066.

== North America ==
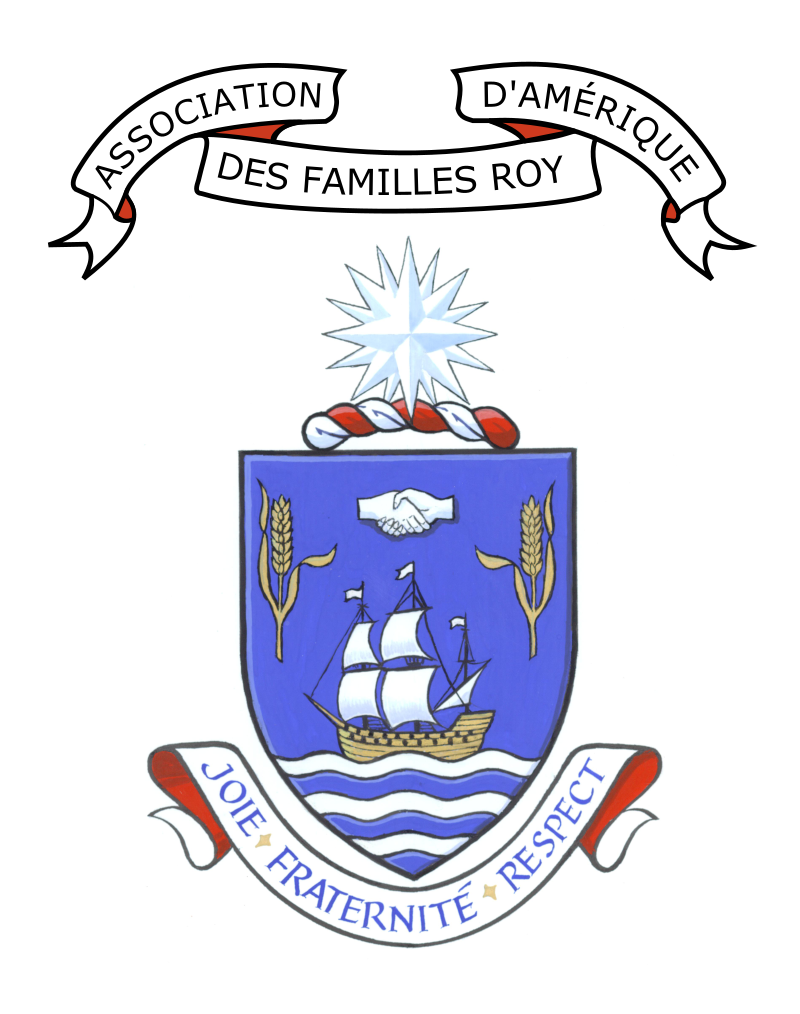
Arms of the Association of Roy Families of America

In Canada and in the United States, the descendants of the families of Roy and Le Roy that immigrated to North America have been granted a coat of arms by the Governor General of Canada.

== Given name, single name, nickname ==
- Leroy (musician), American musician
- Leroy, nickname of Australian rules footballer Leigh Ryswyk (born 1985)
- Leroy Anderson, American composer
- Leroy Baptiste, Trinidad and Tobago politician
- Leroy Bowman (1912–2014), US Army Air Force officer
- Leroy Brown (athlete), Olympic medal-winning American athlete
- Leroy Brown (wrestler), a ring name of professional wrestler Roland Daniels
- Leroy "Shaq" Buchanan (born 1997), American basketball player
- Leroy Burrell, American athlete
- LeRoy Butler, American football player
- Leroy Carr (1904/5–1935), American blues singer and pianist
- Leroy Clampitt (born 1992), New Zealand record producer
- Leroy Gordon Cooper, American astronaut
- Leroy Bowers Crane (1849–1916), American politician and magistrate from New York
- Leroy DeLeon (1948–2025), Trinidad and Tobago footballer
- Leroy D'Sa (born 1953), Indian badminton player and coach
- LeRoy Edwards, American professional basketball pioneer
- "Baby Face" Leroy Foster, Chicago blues musician
- Leroy George, Dutch footballer
- Leroy Griffiths, English footballer
- Leroy Grumman, American aircraft designer and industrialist
- LeRoy Hurd, American basketball player
- Leroy Hurte (1915–2011), American musician, businessman
- LeRoy Irvin (1957–2026), American football player
- Leroy Jenkins (musician) (1932–2007), American composer and violinist/violist.
- Leroy Jenkins (televangelist), American televangelist
- Leroy Jetta, professional Australian rules footballer
- Leroy S. Johnson (1888–1896), American Mormon leader
- Leroy Leblanc (1915–1988), American Cajun musician
- Leroy Lita, Congolese-born English footballer
- Leroy Looper (1924–2011), American community organizer and housing activist in San Francisco
- Leroy Major, Bahamian politician
- Leroy Mokgatle, South African ballerina
- Leroy Nash, American criminal
- LeRoy Neiman, American artist
- Leroy Robert "Satchel" Paige, American professional baseball player
- Leroy Parmelee (1907–1981), American baseball player
- Leroy Fletcher Prouty, United States Air Force officer
- Leroy Rosenior, English footballer and coach
- Leroy Sané, German footballer
- Lee Roy Selmon, NFL football defensive lineman
- Leeroy Stagger, Canadian alternative country singer-songwriter
- Leeroy Thornhill, British electronic music artist
- Leroy Van Dyke, American singer
- Leroy A. Wilson, American businessman
- Leroy Wright, American professional basketball player
- LeeRoy Yarbrough, NASCAR racer

== Surname ==
- Adolphe Leroy, French entrepreneur, co-founder of Leroy Merlin
- Adrian Le Roy (c.1520–1598), French music publisher, lutenist, guitarist, and composer
- Adrien Leroy (born 1981), French chess player and poet
- Ali LeRoi (born 1962), American television producer and writer
- Alphonse Leroy (engraver) (1820–1902), French engraver and photographer
- Alphonse Leroy (physician) (1742–1816), French physician and obstetrician
- Amélie Claire Leroy (1851–1934), English writer, pen-name Esmé Stuart
- André Leroy (1801–1875), French botanist and nurseryman
- Benjamin Leroy (born 1989), French professional footballer
- Benoît Leroy (born 1982), French footballer
- Camille Leroy (1892–1952), Belgian racing cyclist
- Catherine Leroy (1945–2006), French war photojournalist
- Charles-Georges Le Roy (1723–1789), French man of letters
- Christelle Leroy and Lucas Leroy (died 2005), French murder victims
- Claire Leroy (born 1980), French sailor
- Claude Le Roy (born 1948), French football manager and former player
- David H. Leroy (born 1947), American lawyer and politician
- Dominique Leroy (born 1964), Belgian businesswoman
- Edouard Le Roy (1870–1954), French philosopher
- Edward Webster Le Roy (1874–1940), American politician and newspaper editor
- Emarlos Leroy (born 1975), American professional footballer
- Eugène Le Roy (1836–1907), French novelist
- Félix Morisseau-Leroy (1912–1998), Haitian writer
- Henri Leroy (1887–1960), Belgian footballer
- James Leroy (1947–1979), Canadian singer-songwriter
- Jean-François Leroy (1729–1791), French architect
- Jennifer LeRoy (born 1974), American model and actress
- Jérôme Leroy (composer) (born 1981), French composer
- Jérôme Leroy (footballer) (born 1974), French footballer
- Jim LeRoy (1961–2007), American aerobatics pilot
- José Leroy (born 1957), French boxer
- Jules Leroy (1903–1979), French priest and researcher
- Julien Le Roy (1686–1759), French clockmaker and watchmaker
- Julien-David Le Roy (1724–1803), French architect and archaeologist, son of Julien
- Kitty Leroy (c.1850–1877), American dancer, gambler, saloon owner
- Lalou Bize-Leroy (born 1932), French businesswoman and winery owner
- Laurent Leroy (born 1976), French professional footballer
- Léo Leroy (born 2000), French professional footballer
- Louis Leroy (1812–1885), French 19th-century printmaker, painter, playwright
- Margaret Leroy, British romantic novelist
- Marie-Colline Leroy (born 1984), Belgian politician
- Maxime Leroy (1873–1957), French jurist and social historian
- Mehdi Leroy (born 1978), French professional footballer
- Mervyn LeRoy (1900–1987), American actor and director
- Nolwenn Leroy (born 1982), French singer-songwriter
- Oswald Leroy (1936–2022), Belgian mathematician, acousto-optics theorist
- Paul Leroy (1860–1942), French painter noted for Orientalist works
- Paul Leroy (archer) (1884–1949), French archer, Olympic medalist
- Philippe Leroy (1930–2024), French actor
- Philippe Leroy (politician) (1940–2019), former member of the Senate of France
- Philippine Leroy-Beaulieu (born 1963), French actress
- Pierre Le Roy (1717–1785), French clockmaker, son of Julien
- Pierre Le Roy de Boiseaumarié (1890–1967), French co-founder of the Institut National des Appellations d'Origine (INAO)
- Robert LeRoy (1885–1946), American tennis player
- Roland Leroy (1926–2019), French politician
- Serge Leroy (1937–1993), French film director and screenwriter
- William Leroy, American reality television personality, actor, businessman
- William E. Le Roy (1818–1888), United States Navy admiral
- Xavier Leroy (born 1968), French computer scientist and programmer

== Fictional characters ==
- "Bad, Bad Leroy Brown", protagonist of a song by Jim Croce
- "Leroy Johnson", a character in the film Fame, played by Gene Anthony Ray
- "Bring Back That Leroy Brown", subject of a song by Queen
- Leroy Encyclopedia Brown, the titular protagonist of the Encyclopedia Brown children's novels
- Leroy (South Park), a South Park character
- Leroy Jethro Gibbs, a fictional character in the NCIS TV series
- Leeroy Jenkins, World of Warcraft character
- Leroy is the antagonist in Leroy & Stitch
- The fictional Leroy family in the TV show Corner Gas:
  - Brent Herbert Leroy, one of the main characters in Corner Gas, played by Brent Butt
  - Emma Leroy, one of the main characters in Corner Gas, played by Janet Wright
  - Oscar Leroy, one of the main characters in Corner Gas, played by Eric Peterson
- Leroy, a junkyard dog in the DIC show, The Catillac Cats
- Leroy Smith, a character from Tekken series
- Leeroy Mateo, the human counterpart of Jax, a The Amazing Digital Circus character
