= LeRoy (automobile) =

The LeRoy was a Canadian automobile manufactured in Berlin, Ontario, between 1899 and 1904.

The brothers Milton and Nelson Good bought an Oldsmobile and used it as basis for their first car. In 1901, they converted an American Mobile steamer to petrol propulsion and, by 1902, they were ready to commence production.

The car used a single-cylinder engine, and was based on the Curved Dash Oldsmobile. An unusual feature was the lack of brakes on the wheels. To stop the car, the driver used the reverse pedal of the epicyclic transmission.

Production ended in 1904 due to a lack of capital, with several cars still uncompleted.
