= Roy Ndoutoumo =

Gabonese footballer (born 1994)

Personal information
- Full name: Roy Aboubacar Ndoutoumo Kone
- Date of birth: 16 October 1994 (age 32)
- Place of birth: Gabon
- Position: Midfielder

Team information
- Current team: Al-Hilal
- Number: 17

Senior career*
Years	Team	Apps	(Gls)
2015–2018	AS Mangasport		
2019–2020	CF Mounana		
2021–2023	FC Universitario de Vinto	40	(6)
2023	Al-Zawraa SC		
2024–2026	Al Ta'awon SC	13	(4)
2026–	Al-Hilal	2	(0)

International career
2023–	Gabon	1	(0)
- * Club domestic league appearances and goals

Roy Aboubacar Ndoutoumo Kone (born 16 October 1994) is a Gabonese footballer who plays as a midfielder for Libyan Premier League club Al-Hilal.

== Club career ==
Ndoutoumo started his career with Gabonese side AS Mangasport. In 2019, he signed for Gabonese side CF Mounana. In 2021, he signed for Bolivian side FC Universitario de Vinto. He helped the club achieve promotion. In 2023, he signed for Iraqi side Al-Zawraa SC. In 2024, he signed for Libyan side Al Ta'awon SC. He scored three goals in his first four appearances for the club.

== Personal life ==
Ndoutoumo was born in 1994 in Gabon. He was described as "experienced a troubled period due to the end of the national championship following the COVID-19 pandemic which forced him to be unemployed and having difficulty making ends meet".
