= Namba Roy =

Jamaican novelist and artist (1910–1961)

- Born: Nathan Roy Atkins; 25 April 1910; Jamaica
- Died: 16 June 1961 (aged 51); London, England
- Occupations: Novelist, artist
- Spouse: Yvonne Roy (née Shelley)
- Children: Tamba, Jacqueline and Lucinda Roy

Namba Roy (25 April 1910 – 16 June 1961) was a Jamaican novelist and artist. He was the father of writer and educator Lucinda Roy.

== Biography ==
Born Nathan Roy Atkins in 1910 — his birthplace has been given as Kingston, Jamaica, although it is also believed that he may have been born in Accompong, in the hills of St. Elizabeth Parish, where he spent most of his childhood living among the Maroons, descendants of runaway African slaves. It is known that he was descended from Africans brought from the Congo to Jamaica, where they escaped from enslavement to live as free people in the island's mountainous Cockpit Country. Roy's grandfather was his village's traditional master carver, which role was passed on from father to son in subsequent generations. Marie Stewart has written: "Until the age of 11 when his father died, Namba Roy had his father, his uncle and his grandfather as tutors in the traditions of his people. The older men taught the boy the stories and symbols of Africa. Males in the family had been the storytellers for over 200 years." After the death of his father, his mother struggled to bring up four children, and the family was split up, with Roy's older siblings going to relatives while he remained with his mother, at the age of 12 working as an odd-job boy at a school for 14 hours a day, being paid one shilling a week, as he would later recall.

He joined the Merchant Navy at the start of World War II and served on munitions ships and oil tankers until 1944, when he was discharged due to illness and disembarked in Britain (Jamaica being still a British colony, Jamaicans were then regarded as British citizens). He eventually found employment and settled in London (where Namba Roy Crescent is in Lambeth). He later used the African name Namba together with his middle name, changing his name by deed poll in 1956.

Self-taught as a painter and sculptor, Roy exhibited his art in London and Paris, first showing his work in London in 1952. In a tribute after his death, his widow Yvonne Roy wrote: "His most tender subject, the mother and her child, he portrayed over and over again, always finding something new and more wonderful as the image took shape, either from beneath his chisel, or appearing in all the vivid colours of his birthplace, from his brush. These subjects were predominantly Christian, presenting the Child Jesus and His Mother as coloured, identifying his people with God—refusing to subscribe to a colour bar of the spirit." Roy himself noted in an article in The Guardian: "It was Sir Jacob Epstein himself who pointed out to me the similarity of the head and torso of the ivory-carved Christ in my 'Crucifixion' to his colossal and magnificent 'Ecce Homo.' The same out-of-proportion head in contrast to the torso. I had not realised it before and was a little embarrassed until I saw the look of pleasure on the face of this great man."

Roy's novel Black Albino was published in 1961, with a foreword by Tom Driberg, who described the story as an "inverted parable of colour prejudice". It drew on 18th-century Maroon history, although as well as using information handed down by his own family Roy also conducted research in the British Museum. While Black Albino has primarily been discussed only in relation to evidence of Africa in the Caribbean, and has received limited and variable critical attention (including from O. R. Dathorne and Kamau Brathwaite), Mervyn Morris in a 1984 article in Jamaica Journal concluded: "But the success, the value, of this book does not primarily reside in its fidelity to history, its recording of African culture in the Caribbean, nor in such patterns, meanings, literary effects as may be less than obvious. Primarily it works – works well – as an adventure story with boldly drawn characters and a clear-cur morality. Apparently under-edited, the writing is a little clumsy here and there. Black Albino is, however, nearly always vivid. Itself a pleasing work of art, it could inspire an exciting film." Roy's other novel, No Black Sparrows, which he had written in the 1950s before Black Albino but for which he had failed to find a publisher, was posthumously published in 1989.

== Personal life ==
Roy and his English wife Yvonne (née Shelley), an actress, who met in 1950, had three children: Tamba, Jacqueline and Lucinda.

Namba Roy died in London in June 1961, aged 51.

== Bibliography ==
- Black Albino (London: New Literature, 1961; Harlow, Longman, 1968, 1971, 1986)
- No Black Sparrows (London, Heinemann, 1989)
