= Susan DeRoy =

American politician

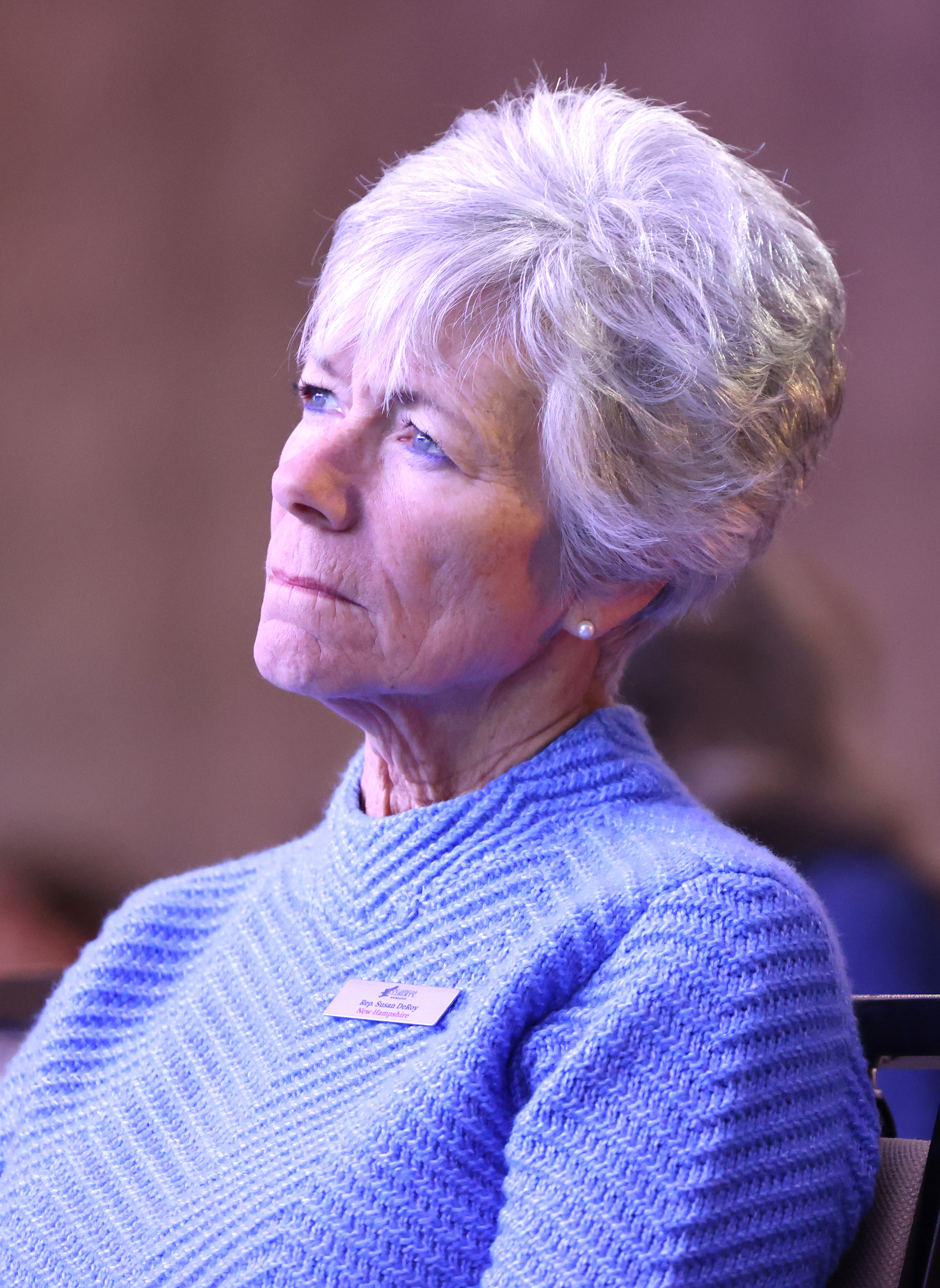
- DeRoy at the 2024 Hazlitt Summit hosted by Young Americans for Liberty Foundation

Member of the New Hampshire House of Representatives from the Strafford 3rd district
- Incumbent
- Assumed office December 4, 2024
- Preceded by: David Bickford

Personal details
- Party: Republican
- Website: https://deroy4nh.com/

Susan DeRoy is an American politician. She serves as a Republican member for the Strafford 3rd district of the New Hampshire House of Representatives.

She defeated incumbent Republican David Bickford in the Republican primary in 2024.
