= Ophelia Deroy =

French philosopher and professor

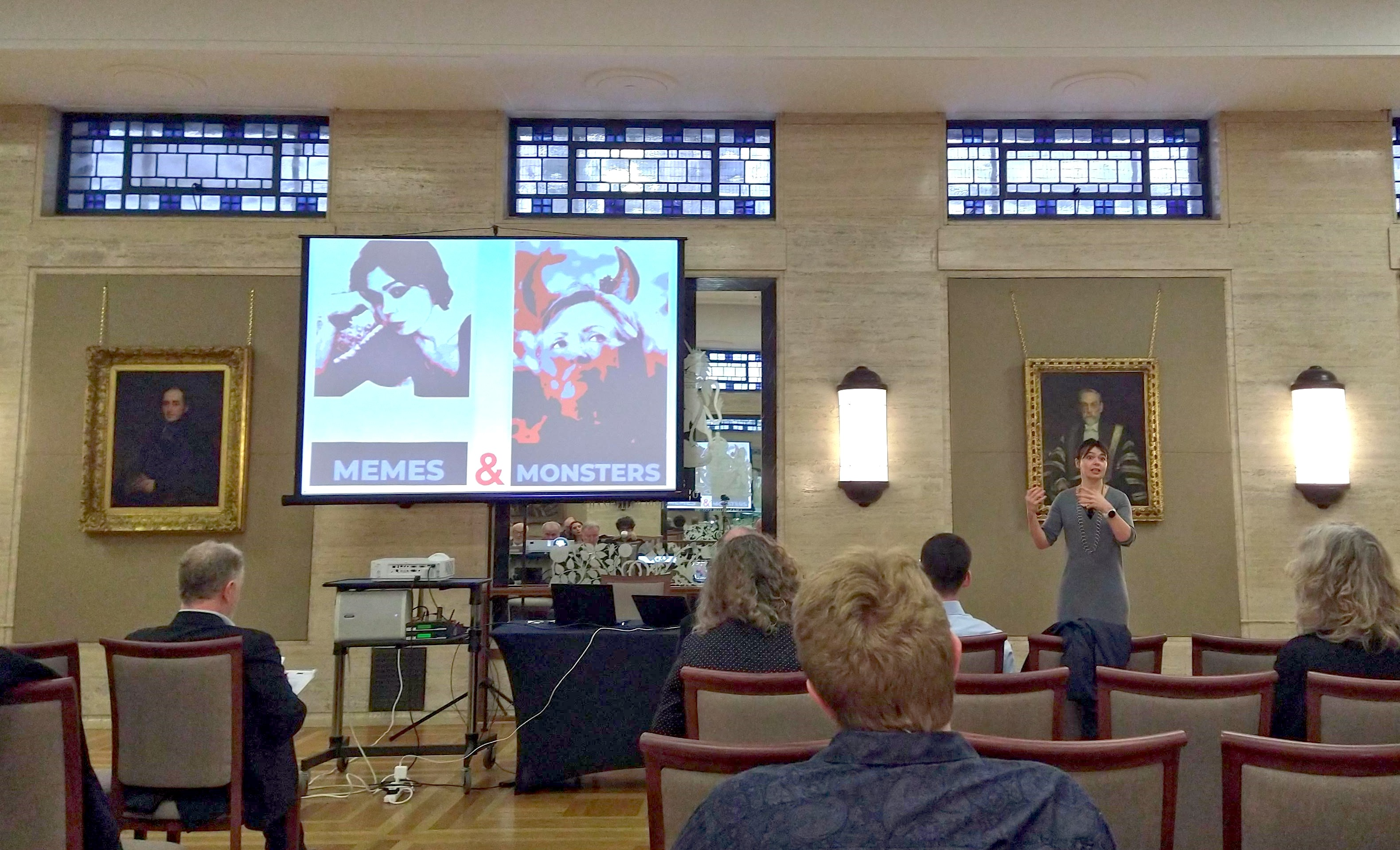
Ophelia Deroy (standing) presenting Memes and Monsters at Under Pressure Truth, Trust and Democracy conference, Senate House, London, November 2019.

Ophelia Deroy is a French philosopher who is professor of Philosophy of Mind at LMU Munich and a member of the Graduate School of Systemic Neurosciences (GSN-LMU) in Munich. She is the former deputy director of the Institute of Philosophy at the University of London. She received the Prix de la Chancellerie des Universites de Paris in 2007.

== Selected publications ==
=== Books ===
- Sensory Blending: On Synaesthesia and Related Phenomena. Oxford University Press, 2017. (Co-editor)

=== Articles ===
- Fairhurst, M. T., & Deroy, O. (2017). Testing the shared spatial representation of magnitude of auditory and visual intensity. Journal of Experimental Psychology: Human Perception and Performance, 43(3), 629–638.
- Deroy, O., Spence, C., & Noppeney, U. (2016). Metacognition in multisensory perception, Trends in Cognitive Sciences, 20, 736–747.
- Deroy, O., Faivre, N., Lunghi, C., Spence, C., Aller, M., & Noppeney, U. (2016). The complex interplay between multisensory integration and perceptual awareness, Multisensory Research, 29, 585 – 606.
- Deroy, O., Fasiello, I., Hayward, V., & Auvray, M. (2016). Differentiated audio-tactile correspondences in sighted and blind individuals, Journal of Experimental Psychology, Human Perception and Performance, 42, 1204–1214.
- Deroy, O., Chen, Y.-C., & Spence, C. (2014). Multisensory constraints on awareness. Philosophical Transactions of The Royal Society B., 369, 1641, 20130207
- Deroy, O. (2013). Object-sensitivity versus cognitive penetrability of perception. Philosophical Studies, 162, 87-107.
- Deroy, O. & Spence, C. (2013a). Are we all born synaesthetic? Examining the neonatal synaesthesia hypothesis. Neuroscience & Biobehavioral Reviews, 37, 1240–1253.
- Deroy, O., & Spence, C. (2013b). Why we are not all synesthetes (not even weakly so). Psychonomic Bulletin & Review, 20, 1-22.
- Spence, C., & Deroy, O. (2013) How automatic are crossmodal correspondences? Consciousness and Cognition, 22, 245–260.
- Deroy, O., & Auvray, M. (2012). Reading the world through the skin and ears: a new perspective on sensory substitution. Frontiers in Psychology, 3:457.
- Spence, C., & Deroy, O. (2012). Hearing mouth shapes: Sound symbolism and the reverse McGurk effect. I-Perception, 3, 550–552.

=== Chapters ===
- Deroy, O., Fernandez-Prieto, I., Navarra, J. & Spence, C. (2017). Unravelling the paradox of spatial pitch, in Hubbard, T (ed.) Spatial biases in perception and cognition, Cambridge : MIT Press.
- Deroy, O. (2016). Multisensory perception and cognitive penetration. In D. Raftopoulos & J. Zembekis (eds). Cognitive Penetration, Oxford: Oxford University Press.
- Deroy, O. (2015) Can Sounds be Red? A New Account of Synaesthesia as Enriched Experience, in Coleman, S. & Coates, P. (eds) Phenomenal Qualities, Oxford: Oxford University Press.
- Deroy, O. (2014). The unity assumption and the many unities of consciousness. In C. Hill & D. Bennett (eds.) The Unity of Consciousness and Sensory Integration. Cambridge (Mass.): MIT Press.
- Deroy, O. (2014). Modularity. In M. Matthen (ed) Oxford Handbook of Philosophy of Perception, Oxford: Oxford University Press.
- Auvray, M. & Deroy, O. (2014). Synesthesia. In M. Matthen (ed.) Oxford Handbook of Philosophy of Perception, Oxford: Oxford University Press.
- Deroy, O. & Auvray, M. (2014). A crossmodal perspective on sensory substitution. In M. Matthen, S. Biggs & D. Stokes (eds.) Perception and its Modalities, Oxford: Oxford University Press.
- Spence, C. & Deroy, O. (2013). Crossmodal imagery. In S. Lacey and R. Lawson (eds.) Multisensory Imagery (pp. 157–183), New York: Springer.
