= Roy Nouhra =

Lebanese-Canadian businessman (born 1974)

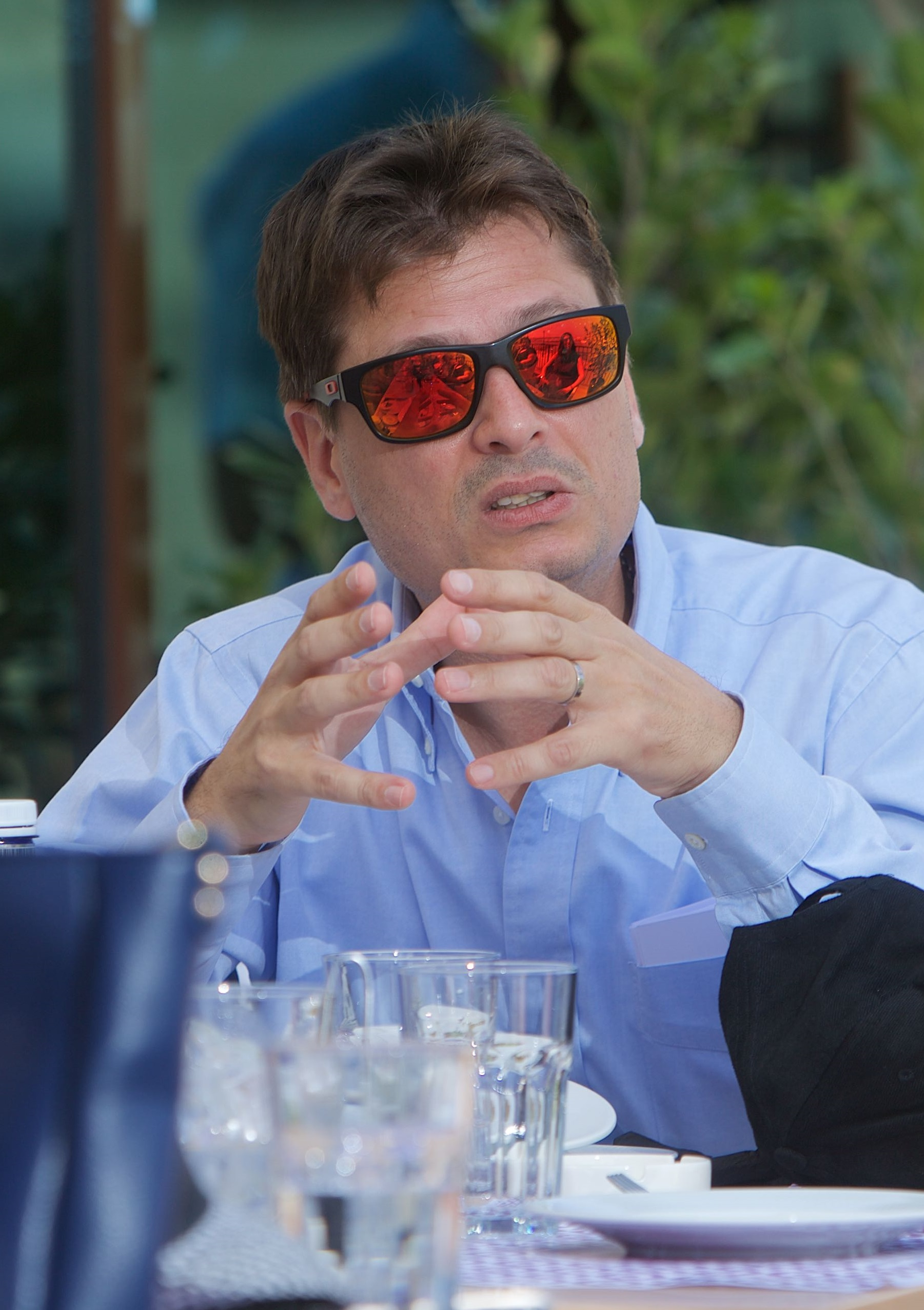
- Roy Nouhra in 2015
- Born: November 14, 1974 (age 51); Lebanon
- Education: George Washington University
- Occupation: Businessman
- Known for: Founder and CEO of Asis Boats
- Spouse: Elena Zogaib
- Children: 4

Roy Raymond Nouhra (November 14, 1974) is a Lebanese-Canadian businessman, investor, race car driver, and engineer. He is the founder and CEO of Asis Boats and the Co-CEO of Solico group UAE. In 2015, he received the Entrepreneur of the Year award at Gulf Capital SME Awards.

== Early life and education ==
Nouhra was born in Lebanon. When he was two, his family moved out of Lebanon to Paris, France because of the war in Lebanon. They lived in Neuilly-sur-Seine and Nouhra went to St Croix Neuilly School. When he was twelve, he and his mother moved to Montreal, Canada, where he studied at Collège de Montréal, graduating in 1991.

In 1993, Nouhra moved to the United States and joined George Washington University for Bachelors of Engineering in Civil Engineering. After graduating in 1997, he joined the Masters of Engineering Management program at the same university, which he completed in 1998.

== Career ==
After completing his education at George Washington University, Nouhra came to the UAE and began managing his family's business, Solico UAE, along with his brother Rainier Nouhra.

In 2005, Nouhra founded Asis boats, a privately owned company that manufactures rigid inflatable boats, RIBs and Vessels. He founded the company using the already existing know how and suppliers. In 2010, Nouhra attended the OPM 42 (Owner President Management Program) in Harvard Business School and became an involved member of the HBS Alumni.

Nouhra became a board member of SWS Board Technology, a manufacturers of wakeboards and snowboards, in 2012. In 2014, he became a board member at the Sealegs International, a public company that manufactures boats in New Zealand. He stepped down from the board in 2016. He also serves as the CEO of Solico Aluminum and Solico Trading.

Nouhra is the President of Entrepreneur Organization (EO) UAE Chapter. EO is a network for entrepreneurs, which helps entrepreneurs learn through peer-to-peer learning and connections to experts. He is also a mentor at Endeavor UAE, a non-profit that supports high-impact entrepreneurs.

== Personal life ==
Nouhra has had Crohn's disease since 1999. In 2010, he went on a journey to Kilimanjaro summit to show that a person with Crohn's disease can live a normal life. He is married to Elena Zogaib, and the couple has four children.

== Recognition ==
In 2015, he won the entrepreneur of the Year award at Gulf Capital SME Awards.
