= Joseph Adrien Le Roi =

French doctor, librarian and historian

Joseph Adrien Le Roi (born 19 March 1797, died 25 February 1873-Versailles) was a French medical doctor, librarian and historian.

== Biography ==
Le Roi began studying medicine around 13 years of age. He entered the Versailles hospital in 1813, and practised as a surgeon from 1815 and until 1845, while also pursuing scholarship in his professional career. In 1845 the municipal council appointed him director of the Bibliothèque municipale de Versailles (public library). He was also correspondent for the Ministry of Public Instruction for Historical Works.

He is the author, among others, of the work "History of Versailles: its streets, squares and avenues, from the origin of this city to the present day" in two volumes, published in 1860.

== Bibliography ==
(Unsorted list)

- Quartier Notre-Dame (French Edition)
- Histoire de Versailles, de Ses Rues, Places et Avenues, Vol.1: Depuis l'Origine de cette Ville Jusqu'à Nos Jours
- Histoire de Versailles, de Ses Rues, Places et Avenues, Vol.2: Depuis l'Origine de cette Ville Jusqu'à Nos Jours
- Curiosites Historiques Sur Louis XIII, Louis XIV, Louis XV, Mme de Maintenon, Mme de Pompadour, Mme Du Barry, Etc
- Récit Des Journées Des 5 Et 6 Octobre 1789 À Versailles, Suivi De Louis Xvi Et Le Serrurier Gamain
- Catalogue Des Livres de La Bibliotheque Relatifs A L'Histoire de La Ville
- Journal Des Regnes de Louis XIV. Et Louis XV. de L'Annee 1701 A L'Annee 1744. ... Recueilli Et Edite Avec Introduction Et Notes Par J. A. Le Roi. by Pierre Narbonne and Joseph Adrien Le Roi
