= Roy Edgar Appleman =

American soldier (1904–1993)

- Born: 10 April 1904; Columbus, Ohio, US
- Died: 12 December 1993 (aged 89); Colorado Springs, Colorado, US
- Education: United States Military Academy
- Military career
- Allegiance: United States
- Conflicts: World War II

Roy Edgar Appleman (10 April 1904 – 12 December 1993) was an American career soldier and military officer who also wrote several historical books.

== Early life and education ==
He was born on 10 April 1904 in Columbus, Franklin County, Ohio.

He attended Ohio State University and Yale Law School.

== Career ==
He had a brief stint with the National Park Service as a site survey historian.

In October 1942, he was drafted into the US Military. He was commissioned into the infantry from officer candidate school.

In 1944, he joined the 1st Information and Historical Service in Hawaii.

After being discharged from the military, he started a new career as a historian and wrote a number of notable historical books.

== Personal life ==
He was married to Irene White.

He had two daughters and one son.

He died on 12 Dec 1993, aged 89, in Colorado Springs, El Paso County, Colorado.

== Bibliography ==
He is the author of a number of notable books:

- South to the Naktong, north to the Yalu : June–November 1950
- Okinawa The Last Battle
- Lewis and Clark : historic places associated with their transcontinental exploration
- Abraham Lincoln : from his own words and contemporary accounts

== See also ==
- List of books about the Korean War
