= Roy Higgins (cricketer) =

Australian cricketer

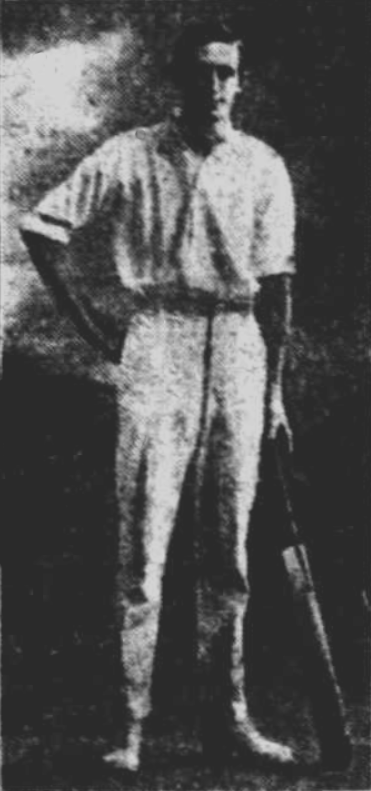

Personal information
- Born: 27 January 1900; Rosalie, Queensland, Australia
- Died: 24 February 1990 (aged 90); Chermside, Queensland, Australia
- Source: Cricinfo, 3 October 2020

Roy Higgins (27 January 1900 – 24 February 1990) was an Australian cricketer. He played in twenty first-class matches for Queensland between 1925 and 1932.

== See also ==
- List of Queensland first-class cricketers
