= Roy J. Harris Jr. =

Reporter and editor

Roy J. Harris Jr. (born October 2, 1946) is a reporter and editor who spent most of his career with The Wall Street Journal. He writes frequently about the journalism Pulitzer Prizes, and is the author of Pulitzer’s Gold, a book telling the back stories of 100 years of reporting that has won the United States' top journalism prize, the Pulitzer Prize for Public Service.

A regular contributor to the Poynter Institute's website, he does an annual preview prior to the day the Pulitzer Prizes are announced.

== Early life and education ==
Harris was born in St. Louis, Missouri, the son of the St. Louis Post-Dispatch reporter Roy J. Harris, and raised in Webster Groves, Missouri. He attended Northwestern University in Evanston, Illinois, earning a Bachelor of Science in journalism degree in 1968 and a Master of Science in journalism degree in 1971 from its Medill School of Journalism. While there, he was the managing editor of the student publication The Daily Northwestern.

He served in the U.S. Army from 1969 to 1970, stationed in Hanau, Germany.

== Career ==
After receiving his master’s, he joined The Wall Street Journal Pittsburgh bureau in 1971. In 1974, he moved to the Journal Los Angeles bureau, taking over coverage of aerospace and defense and writing about airlines, among other topics. Prior to the 1984 Summer Olympic Games in Los Angeles he was the Journal reporter assigned to cover the business of the Olympics in Southern California. His aviation stories covered such topics as the development of classified stealth aircraft and air safety. From 1988 to 1994, he was deputy chief of the Journal’s 14-member Los Angeles bureau, helping to manage coverage of such events as rioting after the 1992 police beating of the motorist Rodney King and the 1994 Northridge earthquake.

In 1996, Harris became senior editor of The Economist Group’s Boston, Massachusetts-based CFO, writing feature stories and a column on mergers and acquisitions. While at CFO, he wrote Pulitzer’s Gold: Behind the Prize for Public Service Journalism. The book was published by the University of Missouri Press. From 2005 to 2007, he was national president of the American Society of Business Publication Editors, and later became president of the non-profit ASBPE Foundation.

In 2010, Harris was founding editor of CFOworld.com, an online publication of the Framingham, Massachusetts-based IDG Enterprise (International Data Group), from which he retired in 2012.

Since the publication of Pulitzer’s Gold, he has appeared at journalism schools and events around the USA to talk about prize-winning reporting. Among his contributions to the website of the St. Petersburg, Florida-based Poynter Institute are historic retrospective articles. He wrote 10-year retrospectives about The Boston Globe’s Pulitzer-winning disclosures about sexual abuse of parishioners by Catholic priests (2013), about the prize-winning coverage of 9/11 by the Wall Street Journal, and about the winning New York Times coverage of the attacks. Harris also makes frequent appearances on Boston’s public television media commentary show Beat the Press.

Parade in 2013 asked Harris to give his view of the most important Pulitzer Prize winners of the last quarter century.

In a relationship with The Washington Post, Harris produced an article in 2014 citing "five myths" about the Pulitzer Prizes. For a number of years he led the Post’s online chat on the day of the Pulitzer announcements.

In 2016, Columbia University Press recognized the centennial of the Pulitzer Prizes by bringing out Pulitzer’s Gold in an updated new edition, subtitled A Century of Public Service Journalism. Columbia continues as the book’s publisher. The Pulitzer Prizes recognized the role of Harris and is book in the centennial by asking him to write for the Pulitzer website about his family’s history with the prizes. The Pulitzer website also recorded the panel Harris led at New York’s 92nd Street YMCA on Dec. 6, 2016.

Also in 2016, the American Society of Business Publication Editors recognized Harris with its Lifetime Achievement Award. In addition to the Poynter Institute, Harris continues to maintain relationships with the Post and Los Angeles Times, for which he produces travel articles and other occasional features.

The research for Pulitzer’s Gold began in 2002, when Harris returned to St. Louis to make a presentation, on the hundredth anniversary of his father's birth, about the five Public Service Pulitzers won by the Post-Dispatch. His father had been involved with four of those Pulitzer-winning projects. The 2002 presentation was made under the auspices of St. Louis University’s James C. Millstone Memorial Lecture.

== Personal life ==
Harris lives in Hingham, Massachusetts, with his wife Eileen Carol McIntyre. He has two children, David McKenna Harris and R.J. Harris III, from his marriage to the late Andrea McKenna Harris, who died in 1998. He also has a stepson and stepdaughter, Jesse D. Laymon and Vicki Raines Laymon.
