= Amigny =

- Commune
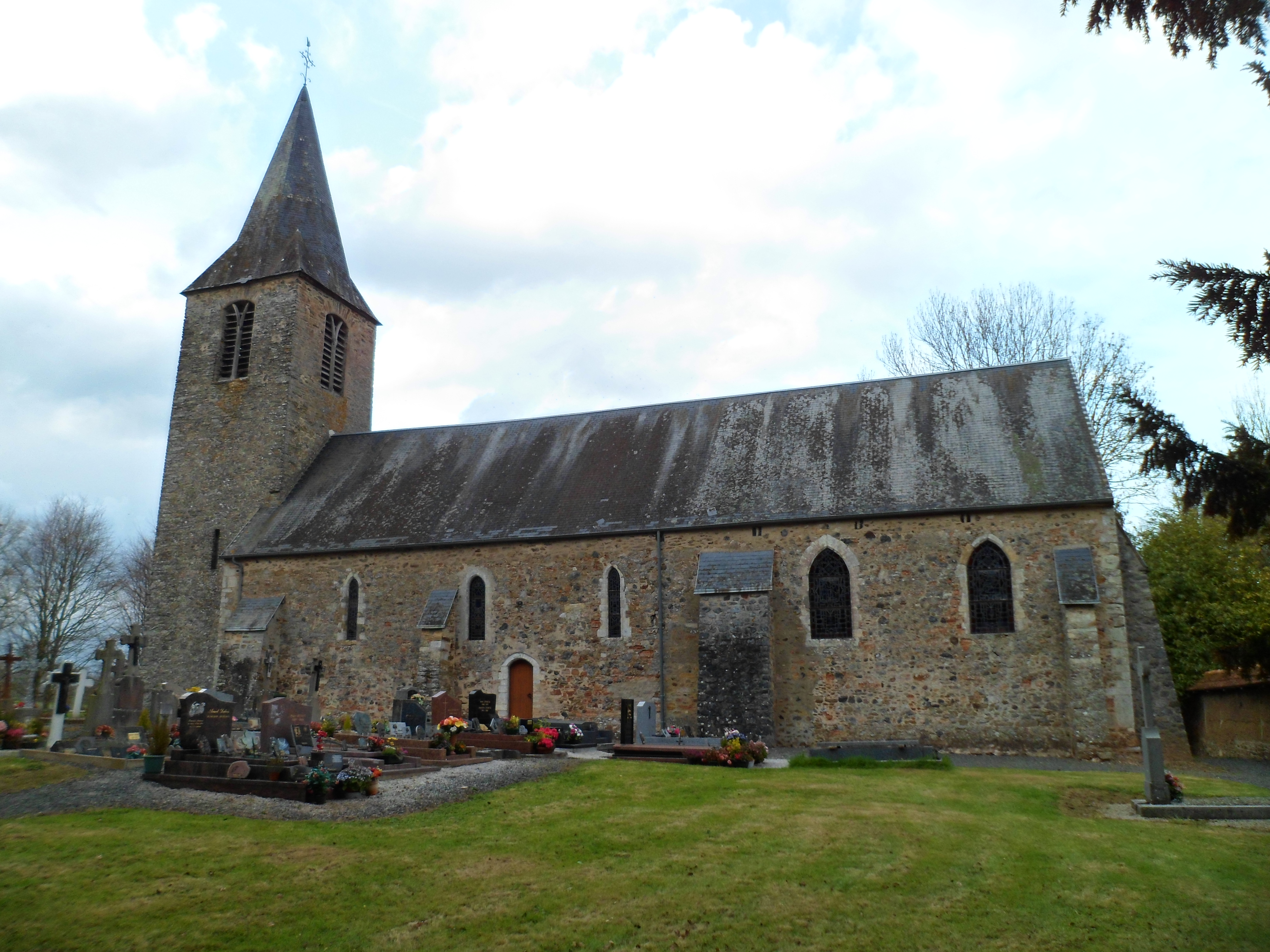
- Notre-Dame church
- Location of Amigny
- Location within France Location within Normandy
- Coordinates: 49°09′23″N 1°10′42″W
- Country: France
- Region: Normandy
- Department: Manche
- Arrondissement: Saint-Lô
- Canton: Pont-Hébert
- Intercommunality: Saint-Lô Agglo

Government
  - Mayor (2021–2026): Gilles Legrand
- Area^{1}: 3.69 km^{2} (1.42 sq mi)
- Highest elevation: 57 m (187 ft)
- Lowest elevation: 13 m (43 ft)
- Population (2023): 151
  - Density: 40.9/km^{2} (106/sq mi)
- Time zone: UTC+01:00 (CET)
  - Summer (DST): UTC+02:00 (CEST)
- INSEE/Postal code: 50006 /50620
- ^{1} French Land Register data, which excludes lakes, ponds, glaciers > 1 km^{2} (0.386 sq mi or 247 acres) and river estuaries.

Amigny (French pronunciation: [amiɲi]) is a commune in the Manche department in the Normandy region in northwestern France.

== History ==
When the Vikings raided northern France and their leader Rollo was granted Normandy in the 10th century, Norsemen had begun to settle in Amigny. One of these Norman families would come to be known as the noble house of Le Roy, who had several knights and lords of Amigny.

== Population ==
Historical population
Year	Pop.	±% p.a.
1968	119	—
1975	104	−1.91%
1982	122	+2.31%
1990	123	+0.10%
1999	123	+0.00%
2007	143	+1.90%
2012	153	+1.36%
2017	147	−0.80%
2023	151	+0.45%
Source: INSEE

== See also ==
- Communes of the Manche department
