= Tony Award for Best Play =

Annual American award honoring Broadway theater productions

- Awarded for: Best Play
- Location: New York City
- Presented by: American Theatre Wing The Broadway League
- Currently held by: Liberation by Bess Wohl (2026)
- Website: TonyAwards.com

The Tony Award for Best Play (formally, an Antoinette Perry Award for Excellence in Theatre) is an annual award given to the best new (non-musical) play on Broadway, as determined by Tony Award voters. There was no award in the Tonys' first year. The award goes to the authors and the producers of the play. Plays that have appeared in previous Broadway productions are instead eligible for Best Revival of a Play.

== Award winners ==
Legend:
† marks winners of the Pulitzer Prize for Drama

* marks finalists of the Pulitzer Prize for Drama

indicates the winner.

=== 1940s ===
Year	Production	Author	Producers
1948 (2nd)
1948 (2nd)	Mister Roberts	Thomas Heggen and Joshua Logan	Leland Hayward
1949 (3rd)
1949 (3rd)	Death of a Salesman †	Arthur Miller	Kermit Bloomgarden and Walter Fried

=== 1950s ===
Year	Production	Author	Producers
1950 (4th)
1950 (4th)	The Cocktail Party	T. S. Eliot	Gilbert Miller
1951 (5th)
1951 (5th)	The Rose Tattoo	Tennessee Williams	Cheryl Crawford
1952 (6th)
1952 (6th)	The Fourposter	Jan de Hartog	
1953 (7th)
1953 (7th)	The Crucible	Arthur Miller	Kermit Bloomgarden
1954 (8th)
1954 (8th)	The Teahouse of the August Moon †	John Patrick	Maurice Evans and George Schaefer
1955 (9th)
1955 (9th)	The Desperate Hours	Joseph Hayes	Howard Erskine and Joseph Hayes
1956 (10th)
1956 (10th)	The Diary of Anne Frank †	Frances Goodrich and Albert Hackett	Kermit Bloomgarden
1956 (10th)	Bus Stop	William Inge	Robert Whitehead and Roger L. Stevens
1956 (10th)	Cat on a Hot Tin Roof †	Tennessee Williams	The Playwrights' Company
1956 (10th)	The Chalk Garden	Enid Bagnold	Irene Mayer Selznick
1956 (10th)	Tiger at the Gates	Jean Giraudoux, adapted by Christopher Fry	Robert L. Joseph, The Playwrights' Company and Henry M. Margolis
1957 (11th)
1957 (11th)	Long Day's Journey into Night †	Eugene O'Neill	Leigh Connell, Theodore Mann and José Quintero
1957 (11th)	The Potting Shed	Graham Greene	Carmen Capalbo and Stanley Chase
1957 (11th)	Separate Tables	Terence Rattigan	The Producers Theatre and Hecht-Lancaster
1957 (11th)	The Waltz of the Toreadors	Jean Anouilh, translated by Lucienne Hill	The Producers Theatre and Robert Whitehead
1958 (12th)
1958 (12th)	Sunrise at Campobello	Dore Schary	Lawrence Langner, Theresa Helburn, Armina Marshall and Dore Schary
1958 (12th)	The Dark at the Top of the Stairs	William Inge	Saint Subber and Elia Kazan
1958 (12th)	Look Back in Anger	John Osborne	David Merrick
1958 (12th)	Look Homeward, Angel †	Ketti Frings	Kermit Bloomgarden and Theatre 200 Inc.
1958 (12th)	Romanoff and Juliet	Peter Ustinov	David Merrick
1958 (12th)	The Rope Dancers	Morton Wishengrad	The Playwrights' Company and Gilbert Miller
1958 (12th)	Time Remembered	Jean Anouilh, English version by Patricia Moyes	The Playwrights' Company in association with Milton Sperling
1958 (12th)	Two for the Seesaw	William Gibson	Fred Coe
1959 (13th)
1959 (13th)	J.B. †	Archibald MacLeish	Alfred de Liagre Jr.
1959 (13th)	The Disenchanted	Harvey Breit and Budd Schulberg	William Darrid and Eleanor Saidenberg
1959 (13th)	Epitaph for George Dillon	John Osborne and Anthony Creighton	David Merrick and Joshua Logan
1959 (13th)	A Touch of the Poet	Eugene O'Neill	The Producers Theatre, Robert Whitehead and Roger L. Stevens
1959 (13th)	The Visit	Friedrich Dürrenmatt, adapted by Maurice Valency	The Producers Theatre

=== 1960s ===
Year	Production	Author	Producers
1960 (14th)
1960 (14th)	The Miracle Worker	William Gibson	Fred Coe
1960 (14th)	The Best Man	Gore Vidal	The Playwrights' Company
1960 (14th)	A Raisin in the Sun	Lorraine Hansberry	Philip Rose and David J. Cogan
1960 (14th)	The Tenth Man	Paddy Chayefsky	Saint Subber and Arthur Cantor
1960 (14th)	Toys in the Attic	Lillian Hellman	Kermit Bloomgarden
1961 (15th)
1961 (15th)	Becket	Jean Anouilh, translated by Lucienne Hill	David Merrick
1961 (15th)	All the Way Home †	Tad Mosel	Fred Coe in association with Arthur Cantor
1961 (15th)	The Devil's Advocate	Dore Schary	Dore Schary
1961 (15th)	The Hostage	Brendan Behan	Leonard S. Field and Caroline Burke Swann
1962 (16th)
1962 (16th)	A Man for All Seasons	Robert Bolt	Robert Whitehead and Roger L. Stevens
1962 (16th)	The Caretaker	Harold Pinter	Roger L. Stevens, Frederick Brisson and Gilbert Miller
1962 (16th)	Gideon	Paddy Chayefsky	Fred Coe and Arthur Cantor
1962 (16th)	The Night of the Iguana	Tennessee Williams	Charles Bowden and Viola Rubber
1963 (17th)
1963 (17th)	Who's Afraid of Virginia Woolf?	Edward Albee	Theatre 1963, Richard Barr and Clinton Wilder
1963 (17th)	Mother Courage and Her Children	Bertolt Brecht, adapted by Eric Bentley	Cheryl Crawford and Jerome Robbins
1963 (17th)	Tchin-Tchin	Sidney Michaels	David Merrick
1963 (17th)	A Thousand Clowns	Herb Gardner	Fred Coe and Arthur Cantor
1964 (18th)
1964 (18th)	Luther	John Osborne	David Merrick
1964 (18th)	The Ballad of the Sad Cafe	Edward Albee	Lewis Allen and Ben Edwards
1964 (18th)	Barefoot in the Park	Neil Simon	Saint Subber
1964 (18th)	Dylan	Sidney Michaels	George W. George and Frank Granat
1965 (19th)
1965 (19th)	The Subject Was Roses †	Frank D. Gilroy	Edgar Lansbury
1965 (19th)	Luv	Murray Schisgal	Clair Nichtern
1965 (19th)	The Odd Couple	Neil Simon	Saint Subber
1965 (19th)	Tiny Alice	Edward Albee	Theatre 1965, Richard Barr and Clinton Wilder
1966 (20th)
1966 (20th)	Marat/Sade	Peter Weiss, English version by Geoffrey Skelton	David Merrick Arts Foundation
1966 (20th)	Inadmissible Evidence	John Osborne	David Merrick Arts Foundation
1966 (20th)	Philadelphia, Here I Come!	Brian Friel	David Merrick Arts Foundation
1966 (20th)	The Right Honourable Gentleman	Michael Dyne	Peter Cookson, Amy Lynn and Walter Schwimmer
1967 (21st)
1967 (21st)	The Homecoming	Harold Pinter	Alexander H. Cohen
1967 (21st)	Black Comedy	Peter Shaffer	Alexander H. Cohen
1967 (21st)	A Delicate Balance †	Edward Albee	Theatre 1967, Richard Barr and Clinton Wilder
1967 (21st)	The Killing of Sister George	Frank Marcus	Helen Bonfils and Morton Gottlieb
1968 (22nd)
1968 (22nd)	Rosencrantz and Guildenstern Are Dead	Tom Stoppard	David Merrick Arts Foundation
1968 (22nd)	Joe Egg	Peter Nichols	Joseph Cates and Henry Fownes
1968 (22nd)	Plaza Suite	Neil Simon	Saint Subber
1968 (22nd)	The Price	Arthur Miller	Robert Whitehead
1969 (23rd)
1969 (23rd)	The Great White Hope †	Howard Sackler	Herman Levin
1969 (23rd)	Hadrian VII	Peter Luke	Lester Osterman Productions, Bill Freedman and Charles Kasher
1969 (23rd)	Lovers	Brian Friel	Helen Bonfils and Morton Gottlieb
1969 (23rd)	The Man in the Glass Booth	Robert Shaw	Glasshouse Productions and Peter Bridge, Ivor David Balding Associates Ltd. and Edward M. Meyers with Leslie Ogden

=== 1970s ===
Year	Production	Author	Producers
1970 (24th)
1970 (24th)	Borstal Boy	Frank McMahon	Michael McAloney and Burton C. Kaiser
1970 (24th)	Child's Play	Robert Marasco	David Merrick
1970 (24th)	Indians	Arthur Kopit	Lyn Austin, Oliver Smith, Joel Schenker and Roger L. Stevens
1970 (24th)	The Last of the Red Hot Lovers	Neil Simon	Saint Subber
1971 (25th)
1971 (25th)	Sleuth	Anthony Shaffer	Helen Bonfils, Morton Gottlieb and Michael White
1971 (25th)	Home	David Storey	Alexander H. Cohen
1971 (25th)	The Philanthropist	Christopher Hampton	David Merrick
1971 (25th)	Story Theatre	Paul Sills	Zev Buffman
1972 (26th)
1972 (26th)	Sticks and Bones	David Rabe	New York Shakespeare Festival and Joseph Papp
1972 (26th)	Old Times	Harold Pinter	Roger L. Stevens
1972 (26th)	The Prisoner of Second Avenue	Neil Simon	Saint Subber
1972 (26th)	Vivat! Vivat Regina!	Robert Bolt	David Merrick and Arthur Cantor
1973 (27th)
1973 (27th)	That Championship Season †	Jason Miller	New York Shakespeare Festival and Joseph Papp
1973 (27th)	Butley	Simon Gray	Lester Osterman and Richard Horner
1973 (27th)	The Changing Room	David Storey	Charles Bowden, Lee Reynolds and Isobel Robins
1973 (27th)	The Sunshine Boys	Neil Simon	Emanuel Azenberg and Eugene V. Wolsk
1974 (28th)
1974 (28th)	The River Niger	Joseph A. Walker	Negro Ensemble Company Inc.
1974 (28th)	The Au Pair Man	Hugh Leonard	Joseph Papp
1974 (28th)	In the Boom Boom Room	David Rabe	Joseph Papp
1974 (28th)	Ulysses in Nighttown	Marjorie Barkentin	Alexander H. Cohen and Bernard Delfont
1975 (29th)
1975 (29th)	Equus	Peter Shaffer	Kermit Bloomgarden and Doris Abrahams
1975 (29th)	The National Health	Peter Nichols	Circle in the Square
1975 (29th)	Same Time, Next Year	Bernard Slade	Morton Gottlieb
1975 (29th)	Seascape †	Edward Albee	Richard Barr, Charles Woodward and Clinton Wilder
1975 (29th)	Short Eyes	Miguel Pinero	Joseph Papp and New York Shakespeare Festival
1975 (29th)	Sizwe Banzi Is Dead / The Island	Athol Fugard, John Kani and Winston Ntshona	Hillard Elkins, Lester Osterman Productions, Bernard Delfont and Michael White
1976 (30th)
1976 (30th)	Travesties	Tom Stoppard	David Merrick, Doris Abrahams and Burry Fredrik in association with S. Spencer Davids and Eddie Kulukundis
1976 (30th)	The First Breeze of Summer	Leslie Lee	Negro Ensemble Company Inc.
1976 (30th)	Knock Knock	Jules Feiffer	Harry Rigby and Terry Allen Kramer
1976 (30th)	Lamppost Reunion	Louis La Russo	Joe Garofalo
1977 (31st)
1977 (31st)	The Shadow Box	Michael Cristofer	Allan Francis, Ken Marsolais, Lester Osterman and Leonard Soloway
1977 (31st)	For Colored Girls Who Have Considered Suicide / When the Rainbow Is Enuf	Ntozake Shange	Joseph Papp
1977 (31st)	Otherwise Engaged	Simon Gray	Michael Codron, Frank Milton and James M. Nederlander
1977 (31st)	Streamers	David Rabe	Joseph Papp
1978 (32nd)
1978 (32nd)	Da	Hugh Leonard	Lester Osterman, Marilyn Strauss and Marc Howard
1978 (32nd)	Chapter Two	Neil Simon	Emanuel Azenberg
1978 (32nd)	Deathtrap	Ira Levin	Alfred De Liagre Jr. and Roger L. Stevens
1978 (32nd)	The Gin Game †	Donald L. Coburn	The Shubert Organization, Hume Cronyn and Mike Nichols
1979 (33rd)
1979 (33rd)	The Elephant Man	Bernard Pomerance	Richmond Crinkley, Elizabeth Ireland McCann and Nelle Nugent
1979 (33rd)	Bedroom Farce	Alan Ayckbourn	Robert Whitehead, Roger L. Stevens, George W. George and Frank Milton
1979 (33rd)	Whose Life Is It Anyway?	Brian Clark	Emanuel Azenberg, James Nederlander and Ray Cooney
1979 (33rd)	Wings	Arthur Kopit	John F. Kennedy Center for the Performing Arts

=== 1980s ===
Year	Production	Author	Producers
1980 (34th)
1980 (34th)	Children of a Lesser God	Mark Medoff	Emanuel Azenberg, The Shubert Organization, Dasha Epstein, and Ron Dante
1980 (34th)	Bent	Martin Sherman	Jack Schlissel and Steven Steinlauf
1980 (34th)	Home	Samm-Art Williams	Elizabeth Ireland McCann, Nelle Nugent, Gerald S. Krone and Ray Larsen
1980 (34th)	Talley's Folly †	Lanford Wilson	Nancy Cooperstein, Porter Van Zandt, and Marc Howard
1981 (35th)
1981 (35th)	Amadeus	Peter Shaffer	The Shubert Organization, Elizabeth Ireland McCann, Nelle Nugent and Roger Berlind
1981 (35th)	Fifth of July	Lanford Wilson	Jerry Arrow, Robert Lussier and Warner Theater Productions
1981 (35th)	A Lesson from Aloes	Athol Fugard	Jay J. Cohen, Richard Press, Louis Bush Hager Associates and Yale Repertory Theatre
1981 (35th)	A Life	Hugh Leonard	Lester Osterman, Richard Horner, Hinks Shimberg and Freydberg-Cutler-Diamond Productions
1982 (36th)
1982 (36th)	The Life and Adventures of Nicholas Nickleby	David Edgar	James M. Nederlander, The Shubert Organization, Elizabeth Ireland McCann and Nelle Nugent
1982 (36th)	Crimes of the Heart †	Beth Henley	Warner Theater Productions Inc., Claire Nichtern, Mary Lea Johnson, Martin Richards, and Francine Le Frak
1982 (36th)	The Dresser	Ronald Harwood	James M. Nederlander, Elizabeth Ireland McCann, Nelle Nugent, Warner Theater Productions Inc. and Michael Codron
1982 (36th)	"Master Harold"...and the Boys	Athol Fugard	The Shubert Organization, Freydberg/Bloch Productions, Dasha Epstein, Emanuel Azenberg and David Geffen
1983 (37th)
1983 (37th)	Torch Song Trilogy	Harvey Fierstein	Kenneth Waissman, Martin Markinson, Lawrence Lane, John Glines, BetMar and Donald Tick
1983 (37th)	Angels Fall	Lanford Wilson	Elliot Martin, Circle Repertory Co., Lucille Lortel, The Shubert Organization and John F. Kennedy Center for the Performing Arts
1983 (37th)	'night, Mother †	Marsha Norman	Dann Byck, Wendell Cherry, The Shubert Organization and Frederick Zollo
1983 (37th)	Plenty	David Hare	Joseph Papp
1984 (38th)
1984 (38th)	The Real Thing	Tom Stoppard	Emanuel Azenberg, The Shubert Organization, Icarus Productions, Byron Goldman, Ivan Bloch, Roger Berlind and Michael Codron
1984 (38th)	Glengarry Glen Ross †	David Mamet	Elliot Martin, The Shubert Organization, Arnold Bernhard and Goodman Theatre
1984 (38th)	Noises Off	Michael Frayn	James M. Nederlander, Robert Fryer, Jerome Minskoff, John F. Kennedy Center for the Performing Arts, Michael Codron, Jonathan Farkas and MTM Enterprises, Inc.
1984 (38th)	Play Memory	Joanna Glass	Alexander H. Cohen and Hildy Parks
1985 (39th)
1985 (39th)	Biloxi Blues	Neil Simon	Emanuel Azenberg and Center Theatre Group / Ahmanson Theatre, Los Angeles
1985 (39th)	As Is	William M. Hoffman	John Glines / Lawrence Lane, Lucille Lortel and The Shubert Organization
1985 (39th)	Hurlyburly	David Rabe	Icarus Productions, Frederick Zollo, Ivan Bloch and ERB Productions
1985 (39th)	Ma Rainey's Black Bottom	August Wilson	Ivan Bloch, Robert Cole and Frederick Zollo
1986 (40th)
1986 (40th)	I'm Not Rappaport	Herb Gardner	James Walsh, Lewis Allen and Martin Heinfling
1986 (40th)	Benefactors	Michael Frayn	James M. Nederlander, Robert Fryer, Douglas Urbanski, Michael Codron, MTM Enterprises, Inc. and CBS Productions
1986 (40th)	Blood Knot	Athol Fugard	James B. Freydberg, Max Weitzenhoffer, Lucille Lortel, Estrin Rose Berman Productions and F.W.M. Producing Group
1986 (40th)	The House of Blue Leaves	John Guare	Lincoln Center Theater, Gregory Mosher and Bernard Gersten
1987 (41st)
1987 (41st)	Fences †	August Wilson	Carole Shorenstein Hays and Yale Repertory Theatre
1987 (41st)	Broadway Bound*	Neil Simon	Emanuel Azenberg
1987 (41st)	Coastal Disturbances	Tina Howe	Circle in the Square, Theodore Mann and Paul Libin
1987 (41st)	Les Liaisons Dangereuses	Christopher Hampton	James M. Nederlander, The Shubert Organization, Inc., Jerome Minskoff, Elizabeth Ireland McCann, Stephen Graham and Jonathan Farkas
1988 (42nd)
1988 (42nd)	M. Butterfly*	David Henry Hwang	Stuart Ostrow and David Geffen
1988 (42nd)	Joe Turner's Come and Gone	August Wilson	Elliot Martin, Vy Higginsen, Ken Wydro and Yale Repertory Theatre
1988 (42nd)	Speed-the-Plow	David Mamet	Lincoln Center Theater, Gregory Mosher and Bernard Gersten
1988 (42nd)	A Walk in the Woods	Lee Blessing	Lucille Lortel, American Playhouse Theatre Productions and Yale Repertory Theatre
1989 (43rd)
1989 (43rd)	The Heidi Chronicles †	Wendy Wasserstein	The Shubert Organization, Suntory International Corp., James Walsh and Playwrights Horizons
1989 (43rd)	Largely New York	Bill Irwin	James Freydberg, Kenneth Feld, Jerry L. Cohen, Max Weitzenhoffer, John F. Kennedy Center for the Performing Arts and Walt Disney Studios
1989 (43rd)	Lend Me a Tenor	Ken Ludwig	Martin Stargar and The Really Useful Theatre Co. Inc.
1989 (43rd)	Shirley Valentine	Willy Russell	The Really Useful Theater Co., Inc. and Bob Swash

=== 1990s ===
Year	Production	Author	Producers
1990 (44th)
1990 (44th)	The Grapes of Wrath	Frank Galati	The Shubert Organization, Steppenwolf Theatre Company, Suntory International Corp. and Jujamcyn Theaters
1990 (44th)	Lettice and Lovage	Peter Shaffer	The Shubert Organization, Robert Fox Ltd. and Roger Berlind
1990 (44th)	The Piano Lesson †	August Wilson	Lloyd Richards, Yale Repertory Theatre, Center Theatre Group / Ahmanson Theatre, Gordon Davidson, Jujamcyn Theaters, Benjamin Mordecai, Eugene O'Neill Theatre, Huntington Theatre Company, Goodman Theatre and Old Globe Theatre
1990 (44th)	Prelude to a Kiss*	Craig Lucas	Christopher Gould, Suzanne Golden and Dodger Productions
1991 (45th)
1991 (45th)	Lost in Yonkers †	Neil Simon	Emanuel Azenberg
1991 (45th)	Our Country's Good	Timberlake Wertenbaker	Frank and Woji Gero, Karl Sydow, Raymond L:. Gaspard, Frederick Zollo, Diana Bliss and Hartford Stage Company
1991 (45th)	Shadowlands	William Nicholson	Elliot Martin, James M. Nederlander, Brian Eastman, Terry Allen Kramer and Roger L. Stevens
1991 (45th)	Six Degrees of Separation*	John Guare	Lincoln Center Theater, Gregory Mosher and Bernard Gersten
1992 (46th)
1992 (46th)	Dancing at Lughnasa	Brian Friel	Noel Pearson, Bill Kenwright and Joseph Harris
1992 (46th)	Four Baboons Adoring the Sun	John Guare	Lincoln Center Theater, André Bishop and Bernard Gersten
1992 (46th)	Two Shakespearean Actors	Richard Nelson	Lincoln Center Theater, Gregory Mosher and Bernard Gersten
1992 (46th)	Two Trains Running*	August Wilson	Yale Repertory Theatre, Stan Wojewodski Jr., Center Theatre Group / Ahmanson Theatre, Gordon Davidson, Jujamcyn Theaters, Benjamin Mordecai, Huntington Theatre Company, Seattle Repertory Theatre and Old Globe Theatre
1993 (47th)
1993 (47th)	Angels in America: Millennium Approaches †	Tony Kushner	Jujamcyn Theaters, Mark Taper Forum / Gordon Davidson, Margo Lion, Susan Quint Gallin, Jon B. Platt, The Baruch-Frankel-Viertel Group, Frederick Zollo and Herb Alpert
1993 (47th)	The Sisters Rosensweig	Wendy Wasserstein	Lincoln Center Theater, André Bishop and Bernard Gersten
1993 (47th)	Someone Who'll Watch Over Me	Frank McGuinness	Noel Pearson, The Shubert Organization and Joseph Harris
1993 (47th)	The Song of Jacob Zulu	Tug Yourgrau	Steppenwolf Theatre Company, Randall Arney, Stephen Eich, Albert Poland, Susan Liederman, Bette Cerf Hill and Maurice Rosenfield
1994 (48th)
1994 (48th)	Angels in America: Perestroika	Tony Kushner	Jujamcyn Theaters, Mark Taper Forum / Gordon Davidson with Margo Lion, Susan Quint Gallin, Jon B. Platt, The Baruch-Frankel-Viertel Group and Frederick Zollo, in association with New York Shakespeare Festival, Mordecai/Cole Productions and Herb Alpert
1994 (48th)	Broken Glass	Arthur Miller	Robert Whitehead / Roger L. Stevens / Lars Schmidt, Spring Sirkin and Terry and Timothy Childs
1994 (48th)	The Kentucky Cycle †	Robert Schenkkan	David Reichenthal, Gene Korf, Roger L. Stevens, Jennifer Manocherian, Annette Niemtzow, Mark Taper Forum / Intiman Theatre Co. and John F. Kennedy Center for the Performing Arts in association with Benjamin Mordecai
1994 (48th)	Twilight: Los Angeles, 1992	Anna Deavere Smith	Benjamin Mordecai, Laura Rafaty, Ric Wanetik, New York Shakespeare Festival, Mark Taper Forum, Harriet Leve, Jeanne Rizzo, James D. Stern, Daryl Roth, Jo-Lynne Worley, Ronald A. Pizzuti, The Booking Office and Freddy Bienstock
1995 (49th)
1995 (49th)	Love! Valour! Compassion!	Terrence McNally	Manhattan Theatre Club, Lynne Meadow, Barry Grove and Jujamcyn Theaters
1995 (49th)	Arcadia	Tom Stoppard	Lincoln Center Theater, André Bishop and Bernard Gersten
1995 (49th)	Having Our Say	Emily Mann	Camille O. Cosby and Judith Rutherford James
1995 (49th)	Indiscretions	Jean Cocteau	The Shubert Organization, Roger Berlind, Capital Cities/ABC and Scott Rudin
1996 (50th)
1996 (50th)	Master Class	Terrence McNally	Robert Whitehead, Lewis Allen and Spring Sirkin
1996 (50th)	Buried Child	Sam Shepard	Frederick Zollo, Nicholas Paleologos, Jane Harmon, Nina Kenneally, Gary Sinise, Edwin Schloss and Liz Oliver
1996 (50th)	Racing Demon	David Hare	Lincoln Center Theater, André Bishop and Bernard Gersten
1996 (50th)	Seven Guitars*	August Wilson	Sageworks, Benjamin Mordecai, Center Theatre Group / Ahmanson Theatre, Gordon Davidson, Herb Alpert / Margo Lion, Scott Rudin / Paramount Pictures, Jujamcyn Theaters, Goodman Theatre, Huntington Theatre Company, American Conservatory Theater and Manhattan Theatre Club
1997 (51st)
1997 (51st)	The Last Night of Ballyhoo*	Alfred Uhry	Jane Harmon, Nina Keneally and Liz Oliver
1997 (51st)	Skylight	David Hare	Robert Fox, Roger Berlind, Joan Cullman, Scott Rudin, The Shubert Organization, Capital Cities/ABC and Royal National Theatre
1997 (51st)	Stanley	Pam Gems	Circle in the Square, Gregory Mosher, M. Edgar Rosenblum and Royal National Theatre
1997 (51st)	The Young Man from Atlanta	Horton Foote	David Richenthal, Anita Waxman, Jujamcyn Theaters, Goodman Theatre and Robert Cole
1998 (52nd)
1998 (52nd)	'Art'	Yasmina Reza	David Pugh and Dafydd Rogers, Sean Connery and Joan Cullman
1998 (52nd)	The Beauty Queen of Leenane	Martin McDonagh	Atlantic Theater Company, Randall Wreghitt, Chase Mishkin, Steven M. Levy, Leonard Soloway, Julian Schlossberg, Norma Langworthy and Druid Theatre Company / Royal Court Theatre
1998 (52nd)	Freak	John Leguizamo	Arielle Tepper, Bill Haber and Gregory Mosher
1998 (52nd)	Golden Child	David Henry Hwang	Benjamin Mordecai, Dori Berinstein, John Kao, Talia Shire, John F. Kennedy Center for the Performing Arts, South coast Repertory, The Joseph Papp Public Theater / New York Shakespeare Festival and American Conservatory Theater
1999 (53rd)
1999 (53rd)	Side Man*	Warren Leight	Weissberger Theater Group, Jay Harris, Peter Manning, Roundabout Theatre Company, Todd Haimes, Ellen Richard, Ron Kastner, James Cushing and Joan Stein
1999 (53rd)	Closer	Patrick Marber	Robert Fox, Scott Rudin, Roger Berlind, Carole Shorenstein Hays, ABC Inc., The Shubert Organization and Royal National Theatre
1999 (53rd)	The Lonesome West	Martin McDonagh	Carole Shorenstein Hays, Stuart Thompson, Marsha Garces Williams, Kelly Gonda, Royal National Theatre, Alley Theatre and Moving Theatre
1999 (53rd)	Not About Nightingales	Tennessee Williams	Randall L. Wreghitt, Steven M. Levy, Norma Langworthy, Gayle Francis, Dani Davis and Jason Howland, Joan Stein and Susan Dietz, Everett King and Druid Theatre Company / Royal Court Theatre

=== 2000s ===
Year	Production	Author	Producers
2000 (54th)
2000 (54th)	Copenhagen	Michael Frayn	Michael Codron, Lee Dean, Royal National Theatre, James M. Nederlander, Roger Berlind, Scott Rudin, Elizabeth Ireland McCann, Ray Larsen, Jon B. Platt, Byron Goldman and Scott Nederlander
2000 (54th)	Dirty Blonde	Claudia Shear	The Shubert Organization, Chase Mishkin, Ostar Enterprises, ABC Inc. and New York Theatre Workshop
2000 (54th)	The Ride Down Mt. Morgan	Arthur Miller	The Shubert Organization, Scott Rudin, Roger Berlind, Spring Sirkin, ABC Inc. and The Public Theater / New York Shakespeare Festival / George C. Wolfe
2000 (54th)	True West	Sam Shepard	Ron Kastner
2001 (55th)
2001 (55th)	Proof †	David Auburn	Manhattan Theatre Club, Lynne Meadow, Barry Grove, Roger Berlind, Carole Shorenstein Hays, Jujamcyn Theaters, Ostar Enterprises, Daryl Roth and Stuart Thompson
2001 (55th)	The Invention of Love	Tom Stoppard	Lincoln Center Theater, André Bishop and Bernard Gersten
2001 (55th)	King Hedley II*	August Wilson	Sageworks, Benjamin Mordecai, Jujamcyn Theaters, 52nd Street Productions, Spring Sirkin, Peggy Hill, Manhattan Theatre Club and Kardana-Swinsky Productions
2001 (55th)	The Tale of the Allergist's Wife	Charles Busch	Manhattan Theatre Club, Lynne Meadow, Barry Grove, Carole Shorenstein Hays, Daryl Roth, Stuart Thompson and Douglas S. Cramer
2002 (56th)
2002 (56th)	The Goat, or Who Is Sylvia?*	Edward Albee	Elizabeth Ireland McCann, Daryl Roth, Carole Shorenstein Hays, Terry Allen Kramer, Scott Rudin, Bob Boyett, Scott Nederlander and Sine/ZPI
2002 (56th)	Fortune's Fool	Mike Poulton	Julian Schlossberg, Roy Furman, Ben Sprecher, Ted Tulchin, Aaron Levy, Peter May, Bob Boyett and James Fantaci
2002 (56th)	Metamorphoses	Mary Zimmerman	Roy Gabay, Robyn Goodman, Allan S. Gordon, Élan V. McAllister, D. Harris/M. Swinsky, Ruth Hendel, Sharon Karmazin, R.L. Wreghitt / J. Bergre, Second Stage Theater, Carole Rothman and Carol Fishman
2002 (56th)	Topdog/Underdog †	Suzan-Lori Parks	Carole Shorenstein Hays, Waxman Williams Entertainment, Bob Boyett, Freddy De Mann, Susan Dietz/Ina Meibach, Scott E. Nederlander, Ira Pittelman, Hits Magazine, Kelpie Arts, Rick Steiner/Frederic H. Mayerson and The Public Theater / New York Shakespeare Festival
2003 (57th)
2003 (57th)	Take Me Out*	Richard Greenberg	Carole Shorenstein Hays, Frederick DeMann, Donmar Warehouse and The Public Theater
2003 (57th)	Enchanted April	Matthew Barber	Jeffrey Richards, Richard Gross/Ellen Berman/Les Goldman, Raymond J. & Pearl Berman Greenwald, Irving Welzer, Tonia Walker Davidson, Libby Adler Mages/Mari Glick, Howard R. Berlin, Jerry Frankel, Terry E. Schnuck, Frederic B. Vogel, Dori Berinstein / Barrie and Jim Loeks / Dramatic Forces
2003 (57th)	Say Goodnight, Gracie	Rupert Holmes	William Franzblau, Jay H. Harris, Louise Westergaard, Larry Spellman, Elsa Daspin Haft, Judith Resnick, Anne Gallagher, Libby Adler Mages/Mari Glick, Martha R. Gasparian, Bruce Lazarus, Lawrence S. Toppall and Jae French
2003 (57th)	Vincent in Brixton	Nicholas Wright	Lincoln Center Theater, André Bishop, Bernard Gersten, Royal National Theatre, Ambassador Theatre Group Ltd., Maidstone Productions, Robert Fox Ltd., Elliott F. Kulick, Incidental Coleman Tod and The Shubert Organization
2004 (58th)
2004 (58th)	I Am My Own Wife †	Doug Wright	Delphi Productions and Playwrights Horizons
2004 (58th)	Anna in the Tropics †	Nilo Cruz	Roger Berlind, Daryl Roth, Ray Larsen, Robert G. Bartner and McCarter Theatre Center
2004 (58th)	Frozen	Bryony Lavery	MCC Theater, Robert LuPone, Bernard Telsey, William Cantler, John G. Schultz, Hal Newman, Zollo/Paleologos and Jeffrey Sine, Roy Gabay, Lorie Cowen Levy and Beth Smith, Peggy Hill, Thompson H. Rogers, Swinsky/Filerman/Hendel, Sirkin/Mills/Baldassare and Darren Bagert
2004 (58th)	The Retreat from Moscow	William Nicholson	Susan Quint Gallin, Stuart Thompson, Ron Kastner, True Love Productions, Mary Lu Roffe and Jam Theatricals
2005 (59th)
2005 (59th)	Doubt †	John Patrick Shanley	Carole Shorenstein Hays, MTC Productions, Inc., Lynne Meadow, Barry Grove, Roger Berlind and Scott Rudin
2005 (59th)	Democracy	Michael Frayn	Boyett Ostar Productions, Nederlander Presentations, Inc., Jean Doumanian, Stephanie P. McClelland, Arielle Tepper, Amy Nederlander, Eric Falkenstein and Roy Furman
2005 (59th)	Gem of the Ocean	August Wilson	Carole Shorenstein Hays and Jujamcyn Theaters
2005 (59th)	The Pillowman	Martin McDonagh	Boyett Ostar Productions, Robert Fox, Arielle Tepper, Stephanie P. McClelland, Debra Black, Dede Harris/Morton Swinsky, Roy Furman/Jon Avnet, Joyce Schweickert and National Theatre
2006 (60th)
2006 (60th)	The History Boys	Alan Bennett	Boyett Ostar Productions, Roger Berlind, Debra Black, Eric Falkenstein, Roy Furman, Jam Theatricals, Stephanie P. McClelland, Judith Resnick, Scott Rudin, Jon Avnet/Ralph Guild, Dede Harris/Mort Swinsky and National Theatre
2006 (60th)	The Lieutenant of Inishmore	Martin McDonagh	Randall L. Wreghitt, Dede Harris, Atlantic Theater Company, David Lehrer, Harriet Newman Leve & Ron Nicynski, Zavelson Meyrelles Greiner Group, Mort Swinsky and Redfern Goldman Productions and Ruth Hendel
2006 (60th)	Rabbit Hole †	David Lindsay-Abaire	Manhattan Theatre Club, Lynne Meadow and Barry Grove
2006 (60th)	Shining City	Conor McPherson	Manhattan Theatre Club, Lynne Meadow, Barry Grove, Scott Rudin, Roger Berlind and Debra Black
2007 (61st)
2007 (61st)	The Coast of Utopia	Tom Stoppard	Lincoln Center Theater, André Bishop, Bernard Gersten and Bob Boyett
2007 (61st)	Frost/Nixon	Peter Morgan	Arielle Tepper Madover, Matthew Byam Shaw, Robert Fox, Act Productions, David Binder, Debra Black, Annette Niemtzow / Harlene Freezer, The Weinstein Company and Donmar Warehouse
2007 (61st)	The Little Dog Laughed	Douglas Carter Beane	Roy Gabay, Susan Dietz, Morris Berchard, Steve Bozeman, Ted Snowdon, Jerry Frankel/Doug Nevin, Jennifer Manocherian/Ina Meibach, Second Stage Theater, Carole Rothman and Ellen Richard
2007 (61st)	Radio Golf	August Wilson	Jujamcyn Theaters, Margo Lion, Jeffrey Richards / Jerry Frankel, Tamara Tunie/Wendell Pierce, Fran Kirmser, Bunting Management Group, Georgia Frontiere and Open Pictures, Lauren Doll/Steven Greil & The AW Group, Wonder City, Inc./Townsend Teague, Jack Viertel and Gordon Davidson
2008 (62nd)
2008 (62nd)	August: Osage County †	Tracy Letts	Jeffrey Richards, Jean Doumanian, Steve Traxler, Jerry Frankel, Ostar Productions, Jennifer Manocherian, The Weinstein Company, Debra Black / Daryl Roth, Ronald & Marc Frankel/Barbara Freitag, Rick Steiner/Staton Bell Group and Steppenwolf Theatre Company
2008 (62nd)	Rock 'n' Roll	Tom Stoppard	Bob Boyett and Sonia Friedman Productions, Ostar Productions, Roger Berlind, Tulchin/Bartner, Douglas G. Smith, Dancap Productions, Jam Theatricals, The Weinstein Company, Lincoln Center Theater and Royal Court Theatre
2008 (62nd)	The Seafarer	Conor McPherson	Ostar Productions, Bob Boyett, Roy Furman, Lawrence Horowitz, Jam Theatricals, Bill Rollnick/Nancy Ellison Rollnick, James D'Orta, Thomas S. Murphy, Ralph Guild/Jon Avnet, Philip Geier/Keough Partners, Eric Falkenstein / Max OnStage and National Theatre
2008 (62nd)	The 39 Steps	Patrick Barlow	Roundabout Theatre Company, Todd Haimes, Harold Wolpert, Julia C. Levy, Bob Boyett, Harriet Newman Leve/Ron Nicynski, Stewart F. Lane / Bonnie Comley, Manocherian Golden Prods., Olympus Theatricals / Douglas Denoff, Marek J. Cantor/Pat Addiss, Huntington Theatre Company / Nicholas Martin / Michael Maso and Edward Snape for Fiery Angel Ltd.
2009 (63rd)
2009 (63rd)	God of Carnage	Yasmina Reza	Robert Fox, David Pugh and Dafydd Rogers, Stuart Thompson, Scott Rudin, Jon B. Platt, The Weinstein Company and The Shubert Organization
2009 (63rd)	Dividing the Estate	Horton Foote	Lincoln Center Theater, Bernard Gersten, André Bishop and Primary Stages
2009 (63rd)	reasons to be pretty	Neil LaBute	Jeffrey Richards, Jerry Frankel, MCC Theater, Gary Goddard Entertainment, Ted Snowdon, Doug Nevin/Erica Lynn Schwartz, Ronald Frankel/Bat-Barry Productions, Kathleen Seidel, Kelpie Arts, LLC, Jam Theatricals and Rachel Helson / Heather Provost
2009 (63rd)	33 Variations	Moisés Kaufman	David Binder, Ruth Hendel, Barbara Whitman, Goldberg/Mills, Latitude Link, Arielle Tepper Madover, Bill Resnick, Eric Schnall, Jayne Baron Sherman, Willis/True Love Productions, Tectonic Theater Project, Greg Reiner, Dominick Balletta and Jeffrey LaHoste

=== 2010s ===
Year	Production	Author	Producers
2010 (64th)
2010 (64th)	Red	John Logan	Arielle Tepper Madover, Stephanie P. McClelland, Matthew Byam Shaw, Neal Street, Fox Theatricals, Ruth Hendel / Barbara Whitman, Philip Hagemann / Murray Rosenthal and Donmar Warehouse
2010 (64th)	In the Next Room (or The Vibrator Play)*	Sarah Ruhl	Lincoln Center Theater, André Bishop and Bernard Gersten
2010 (64th)	Next Fall	Geoffrey Nauffts	Elton John and David Furnish, Barbara Manocherian, Richard Willis, Tom Smedes, Carole L. Haber / Chase Mishkin, Ostar, Anthony Barrile, Michael Palitz, Bob Boyett, James Spry / Catherine Schreiber, Probo Productions, Roy Furman and Naked Angels
2010 (64th)	Time Stands Still	Donald Margulies	Manhattan Theatre Club, Lynne Meadow, Barry Grove and Nelle Nugent / Wendy Federman
2011 (65th)
2011 (65th)	War Horse	Nick Stafford	Lincoln Center Theater, André Bishop, Bernard Gersten, National Theatre, Nicholas Hytner, Nick Starr, Bob Boyett and War Horse LP
2011 (65th)	Good People	David Lindsay-Abaire	Manhattan Theatre Club, Lynne Meadow and Barry Grove
2011 (65th)	Jerusalem	Jez Butterworth	Sonia Friedman Productions, Stuart Thompson, Scott Rudin, Roger Berlind, Royal Court Theatre Productions, Beverly Bartner / Alice Tulchin, Dede Harris / Rupert Gavin, Broadway Across America, Jon B. Platt, 1001 Nights / Stephanie P. McClelland, Carole L. Haber / Richard Willis and Jacki Barlia Florin / Adam Blanshay
2011 (65th)	The Motherfucker with the Hat	Stephen Adly Guirgis	Scott Rudin, Stuart Thompson, Public Theater Productions, Oskar Eustis, Joey Parnes, Labyrinth Theater Company, Stephen Adly Guirgis, Mimi O'Donnell, Yul Vázquez, Danny Feldman, Fabula Media Partners LLC, Jean Doumanian, Ruth Hendel, Carl Moellenberg, Jon B. Platt and Tulchin Bartner / Jamie deRoy
2012 (66th)
2012 (66th)	Clybourne Park †	Bruce Norris	Jujamcyn Theaters, Jane Bergère, Roger Berlind / Quintet Productions, Eric Falkenstein / Dan Frishwasser, Ruth Hendel/Harris Karma Productions, JTG Theatricals, Daryl Roth, Jon B. Platt, Center Theatre Group, Lincoln Center Theater and Playwrights Horizons
2012 (66th)	Other Desert Cities*	Jon Robin Baitz	Lincoln Center Theater, André Bishop, Bernard Gersten and Bob Boyett
2012 (66th)	Peter and the Starcatcher	Rick Elice	Nancy Nagel Gibbs, Greg Schaffert, Eva Price, Tom Smedes, Disney Theatrical Productions, Suzan & Ken Wirth/DeBartolo Miggs, Catherine Schreiber / Daveed Frazier and Mark Thompson, Jack Lane, Jane Dubin, Allan S. Gordon/Adam S. Gordon, Baer & Casserly/Nathan Vernon, Rich Affannato/Peter Stern, Brunish & Trinchero/Laura Little Productions, Larry Hirschhorn/Hummel & Greene, Jamie deRoy and Probo Prods./Radio Mouse Ent., Hugh Hysell/Freedberg & Dale and New York Theatre Workshop
2012 (66th)	Venus in Fur	David Ives	Manhattan Theatre Club, Lynne Meadow, Barry Grove, Jon B. Platt, Scott Landis and Classic Stage Company
2013 (67th)
2013 (67th)	Vanya and Sonia and Masha and Spike	Christopher Durang	Emily Mann, Joey Parnes, Larry Hirschhorn, Joan Raffe & Jhett Tolentino, Martin Platt & David Elliott, Pat Flicker Addiss, Catherine Adler, John O’Boyle, Joshua Goodman, Jamie deRoy / Richard Winkler, Cricket Hooper Jiranek/Michael Palitz, Mark S. Golub & David S. Golub, Radio Mouse Entertainment, ShadowCatcher Entertainment, Mary Cossette/Barbara Manocherian, Megan Savage/Meredith Lynsey Schade, Hugh Hysell/Richard Jordan, Cheryl Wiesenfeld/Ron Simons, S.D. Wagner, John Johnson, McCarter Theatre Center and Lincoln Center Theater
2013 (67th)	The Assembled Parties	Richard Greenberg	Manhattan Theatre Club, Lynne Meadow and Barry Grove
2013 (67th)	Lucky Guy	Nora Ephron	Colin Callender, Roy Furman, Arielle Tepper Madover, Roger & William Berlind, Stacey Mindich, Robert Cole and Frederick Zollo, David Mirvish, Daryl Roth, James D. Stern/Douglas L. Meyer, Scott & Brian Zeilinger, Sonia Friedman Productions and The Shubert Organization
2013 (67th)	The Testament of Mary	Colm Toibin	Scott Rudin, Stuart Thompson, Jon B. Platt, Roger Berlind, Broadway Across America, Scott M. Delman, Jean Doumanian, Roy Furman, Stephanie P. McClelland, Sonia Friedman Productions / Tulchin Bartner Productions, The Araca Group, Heni Koenigsberg, Daryl Roth and Eli Bush
2014 (68th)
2014 (68th)	All the Way	Robert Schenkkan	Jeffrey Richards, Louise Gund, Jerry Frankel, Stephanie P. McClelland, Double Gemini Productions, Rebecca Gold, Scott M. Delman, Barbara H. Freitag, Harvey Weinstein, Gene Korf, William Berlind, Caiola Productions, Gutterman Chernoff, Jam Theatricals, Gabrielle Palitz, Cheryl Wiesenfeld, Will Trice, The Oregon Shakespeare Festival and American Repertory Theater
2014 (68th)	Act One	James Lapine	Lincoln Center Theater, André Bishop, Adam Siegel and Hattie K. Jutagir
2014 (68th)	Casa Valentina	Harvey Fierstein	Manhattan Theatre Club, Lynne Meadow, Barry Grove, Colin Callender, Robert Cole, Frederick Zollo and The Shubert Organization
2014 (68th)	Mothers and Sons	Terrence McNally	Tom Kirdahy, Roy Furman, Paula Wagner and Debbie Bisno, Barbara Freitag & Loraine Alterman Boyle, Hunter Arnold, Paul Boskind, Ken Davenport, Lams Productions, Mark Lee & Ed Filipowski, Roberta Pereira/Brunish-Trinchero, Sanford Robertson, Tom Smedes & Peter Stern and Jack Thomas / Susan Dietz
2014 (68th)	Outside Mullingar	John Patrick Shanley	Manhattan Theatre Club, Lynne Meadow and Barry Grove
2015 (69th)
2015 (69th)	The Curious Incident of the Dog in the Night-Time	Simon Stephens	Stuart Thompson, Tim Levy for NT America, Warner Bros. Theatre Ventures, Nick Starr & Chris Harper for NT Productions, Bob Boyett, Roger Berlind, Scott M. Delman, Roy Furman, Glass Half Full Productions, Ruth Hendel, Jon B. Platt, Prime Number Group, Scott Rudin, Triple Play Broadway, The Shubert Organization and National Theatre
2015 (69th)	Disgraced †	Ayad Akhtar	The Araca Group, Lincoln Center Theater, Jenifer Evans, Amanda Watkins, Richard Winkler, Rodger Hess, Stephanie P. McClelland, Tulchin/Bartner Productions, Jessica Genick, Jonathan Reinis, Carl Levin/Ashley De Simone/TNTDynaMite Productions, Alden Bergson/Rachel Weinstein, Greenleaf Productions, Darren DeVerna/Jere Harris, The Shubert Organization and The David Merrick Arts Foundation
2015 (69th)	Hand to God	Robert Askins	Kevin McCollum, Broadway Global Ventures, CMC, Morris Berchard, Mariano V. Tolentino, Jr., Stephanie Kramer, LAMS Productions, DeSimone/Winkler, Joan Raffe & Jhett Tolentino, Timothy Laczynski, Lily Fan, Ayal Miodovnik, Jam Theatricals, Ensemble Studio Theatre and MCC Theater
2015 (69th)	Wolf Hall, Parts One & Two	Hilary Mantel and Mike Poulton	Jeffrey Richards, Jerry Frankel, Matthew Byam Shaw, Nia Janis & Nick Salmon for Playfull Productions UK, Carole Shorenstein Hays, Jam Theatricals, Ron Kastner, Kyodo Tokyo, Inc., Tulchin Bartner Productions, WLE MSG, Jane Bergère, Scott M. Delman, Rebecca Gold, Just for Laughs Theatricals, Kit Seidel, Triple Play Productions, Gabrielle Palitz, Georgia Gatti, Jessica Genick, Will Trice, The Shubert Organization and The Royal Shakespeare Company
2016 (70th)
2016 (70th)	The Humans*	Stephen Karam	Scott Rudin, Barry Diller, Roundabout Theatre Company, Fox Theatricals, James L. Nederlander, Terry Allen Kramer, Roy Furman, Daryl Roth, Jon B. Platt, Eli Bush, Broadway Across America, Jack Lane, Barbara Whitman, Jay Alix & Una Jackman, Scott M. Delman, Sonia Friedman, Amanda Lipitz, Peter May, Stephanie P. McClelland, Lauren Stein, The Shubert Organization, Joey Parnes, Sue Wagner, John Johnson, Todd Haimes, Harold Wolpert, Julia C. Levy and Sydney Beers
2016 (70th)	Eclipsed	Danai Gurira	Stephen C. Byrd, Alia Jones-Harvey, Paula Marie Black, Carole Shorenstein Hays, Alani Lala Anthony, Michael Magers, Kenny Ozoude, Willette Klausner, Davelle, Dominion Pictures, Emanon Productions, FG Productions, The Forstalls, MA Theatricals, The Public Theater, Oskar Eustis and Patrick Willingham
2016 (70th)	The Father	Florian Zeller	Manhattan Theatre Club, Lynne Meadow and Barry Grove
2016 (70th)	King Charles III	Mike Bartlett	Stuart Thompson, Sonia Friedman Productions, Almeida Theatre, Robert G. Bartner, Norman Tulchin, Lee Dean & Charles Diamond, Scott M. Delman, Ruth Hendel, Stephanie P. McClelland, Jon B. Platt, Scott Rudin, Richard Winkler, Zeilinger Productions and The Shubert Organization
2017 (71st)
2017 (71st)	Oslo	J. T. Rogers	Lincoln Center Theater, André Bishop, Adam Siegel and Hattie K. Jutagir
2017 (71st)	A Doll's House, Part 2	Lucas Hnath	Scott Rudin, Eli Bush, Barry Diller, Carole Shorenstein Hays, Universal Stage Productions, John Gore Organization, James L. Nederlander, Ambassador Theatre Group, Len Blavatnik, Peter May, Seth A. Goldstein, Heni Koenigsberg, Stephanie P. McClelland, Jay Alix & Una Jackman, Al Nocciolino, True Love Productions, Diana DiMenna, JFL Theatricals, Barbara Freitag & Patty Baker, Benjamin Lowy & Adrian Salpeter, John Mara, Jr. & Benjamin Simpson, Joey Parnes, Sue Wagner and John Johnson
2017 (71st)	Indecent	Paula Vogel	Daryl Roth, Elizabeth Ireland McCann, Cody Lassen, Jerry Meyer, Jay Alix & Una Jackman, Elizabeth Armstrong, Julie Boardman, CoGo Partners, Nicole Eisenberg, Four Star Productions, GLS Productions, John Gore Organization, Kathleen K. Johnson, Dana M. Lerner, Jenn Maley, Mano-Horn Productions, Marc Platt, Storyboard Entertainment, Yale Repertory Theatre, La Jolla Playhouse and Vineyard Theatre
2017 (71st)	Sweat †	Lynn Nottage	Stuart Thompson, Louise L. Gund, Tulchin Bartner Productions, Jon B. Platt, Roy Furman, Len Blavatnik, Shelly Mitchell, Scott Rudin, Ted Snowdon, Kevin Emrick, True Love Productions, John Gore, Deborah Taylor / Richard Winkler, The Public Theater, Oskar Eustis and Patrick Willingham
2018 (72nd)
2018 (72nd)	Harry Potter and the Cursed Child	Jack Thorne	Sonia Friedman Productions, Colin Callender and Harry Potter Theatrical Productions
2018 (72nd)	The Children	Lucy Kirkwood	Manhattan Theatre Club, Lynne Meadow, Barry Grove, Royal Court Theatre, Vicky Featherstone and Lucy Davies
2018 (72nd)	Farinelli and the King	Claire van Kampen	Sonia Friedman Productions, Shakespeare's Globe, Paula Marie Black, Tom Smedes, Peter Stern, Jane Bergère, Jane Dubin/Rachel Weinstein, 1001 Nights Productions, Elizabeth Cuthrell & Steven Tuttleman, Rupert Gavin, Robyn L. Paley, SGC USA, Tulchin Bartner Productions, Cindy & Jay Gutterman/Marc David Levine, Marguerite Hoffman/Van Kaplan and Shakespeare Road
2018 (72nd)	Junk	Ayad Akhtar	Lincoln Center Theater, André Bishop, Adam Siegel, Hattie K. Jutagir and The Araca Group
2018 (72nd)	Latin History for Morons	John Leguizamo	Nelle Nugent, Kenneth Teaton, Denoff Salmira Amigos - Jeremy Handelman, Ben DeJesus, Audible, Peter Fine, Jon B. Platt, Jamie deRoy, Melissa and Dan Berger, Stefany Bergson, Willette M. Klausner, Jose Mendez/Katie Graziano, Morwin Schmookler, Avex International Inc., Berkeley Repertory Theatre, Tony Taccone, Michael Leibert, Susan Medak, The Public Theater, Oskar Eustis, Patrick Willingham and Mandy Hackett
2019 (73rd)
2019 (73rd)	The Ferryman	Jez Butterworth	Sonia Friedman Productions, Neal Street Productions, Ronald Frankel, Gavin Kalin Productions, Roy Furman / Benjamin Lowy, Scott M. Delman, Stephanie P. McClelland, Tulchin Bartner Productions, Ron Kastner, Starry Night Entertainment, Kallish Weinstein Creative, Scott Landis, Steve Traxler, Richard Winkler, Rona Delves Broughton / Bill Damaschke, 1001 Nights, Burnt Umber Productions, Rupert Gavin, Scott Rudin, Jamie deRoy / Catherine Adler, Sam Levy / Lauren Stevens and Ramin Sabi / Christopher Ketner
2019 (73rd)	Choir Boy	Tarell Alvin McCraney	Manhattan Theatre Club, Lynne Meadow and Barry Grove
2019 (73rd)	Gary: A Sequel to Titus Andronicus	Taylor Mac	Scott Rudin, Barry Diller, Eli Bush, Eric Falkenstein, Suzanne Grant, No Guarantees, Universal Theatrical Group, James L. Nederlander, Columbia Live Stage, John Gore Organization, Spring Sirkin, Jay Alix and Una Jackman, Jamie deRoy, Wendy Federman, Barbara Manocherian, Al Nocciolino, Bruce Robert Harris and Jack W. Batman, Adam Rodner, Joey Parnes, Sue Wagner and John Johnson
2019 (73rd)	Ink	James Graham	Manhattan Theatre Club, Lynne Meadow, Barry Grove, Almeida Theatre, Rupert Goold, Denise Wood, Sonia Friedman Productions and Diane Benjamin
2019 (73rd)	What the Constitution Means to Me*	Heidi Schreck	Diana DiMenna, Aaron Glick, Matt Ross, Madeleine Foster Bersin, Myla Lerner / Jon Bierman, Jenna Segal / Catherine Markowitz, Jana Shea / Maley-Stolbun-Sussman, Rebecca Gold / Jose Antonio Vargas, Level Forward, Cornice Productions, Lassen Wyse Balsam, Nederlander Presentations / Kate Lear, Clubbed Thumb, True Love Productions and New York Theatre Workshop

=== 2020s ===
Year	Production	Author	Producers
2020 (74th)
2020 (74th)	The Inheritance	Matthew Lopez	Tom Kirdahy, Sonia Friedman Productions, Hunter Arnold, Elizabeth Dewberry and Ali Ahmet Kocabiyik, 1001 Nights Productions, Robert Greenblatt, Mark Lee, Peter May, Scott Rudin, Richard Winkler, Bruce Cohen, Mara Isaacs, Greg Berlanti and Robbie Rogers, Brad Blume, Burnt Umber Productions, Shane Ewen, Greenleaf Productions, Marguerite Hoffman, Oliver Roth, Joseph Baker / Drew Hodges, Stephanie P. McClelland, Broadway Strategic Return Fund, Caiola Productions, Mary J. Davis, Kayla Greenspan, Fakston Productions, FBK Productions, Sally Cade Holmes, Benjamin Lowy, MWM Live, Lee and Alec Seymour, Lorenzo Thione, Sing Out, Louise! Productions, AB Company / Julie Boardman, Adam Zell & Co. / ZKM Media, Jamie deRoy / Catherine Adler, DeSantis-Baugh Productions / Adam Hyndman, Gary DiMauro / Meredith Lynsey Schade, John Goldwyn / Silva Theatrical Group, Deborah Green / Christina Mattsson, Cliff Hopkins / George Scarles, Invisible Wall Productions / Lauren Stein, Sharon Karmazin / Broadway Factor NYC, Brian Spector / Madeleine Foster Bersin, Undivided Productions / Hysell Dohr Group, Ushkowitzlatimer Productions / Tyler Mount and The Young Vic
2020 (74th)	Grand Horizons	Bess Wohl	Second Stage Theater, Carole Rothman, Williamstown Theatre Festival and Mandy Greenfield
2020 (74th)	Sea Wall/A Life	Simon Stephens and Nick Payne	Nine Stories, Ambassador Theatre Group, Seaview Productions, Benjamin Lowy Productions, LFG Theatrical, Audible, Gavin Kalin Productions, Glass Half Full Productions, Jacob Langfelder, Brian Moreland, Roth-Manella Productions, Salman Vienn Al-Rashid Friends, SLSM Theatricals, Teresa Tsai, Dunetz Restieri Productions, Morwin Schmookler, Jane and Mark Wilf, The Public Theater, Oskar Eustis, Patrick Willingham and Mandy Hackett
2020 (74th)	Slave Play	Jeremy O. Harris	Seaview Productions, Troy Carter, Level Forward, Nine Stories, Sing Out, Louise! Productions, Shooting Star Productions, Roth-Manella Productions, Carlin Katler Productions, Cohen Hopkins Productions, Thomas Laub, Blair Russell, WEB Productions, Salman Al-Rashid, Jeremy O. Harris, Mark Shacket and New York Theatre Workshop
2020 (74th)	The Sound Inside	Adam Rapp	Jeffrey Richards, Lincoln Center Theater, Rebecca Gold, Evamere Entertainment, Eric Falkenstein, Salman Vienn Al-Rashid, Spencer Ross, FilmNation Entertainment / Faliro House, Iris Smith, Jane Bergère, Caiola Productions, Mark S. Golub and David S. Golub, Ken Greiner, Gemini Theatrical Investors, Scott H. Mauro, Jayne Baron Sherman, CZEKAJ Productions, Wendy Morgan-Hunter, Kristin Foster, Brian Moreland, Sonia Mudbhatkal, Jacob Soroken Porter, Williamstown Theatre Festival and Mandy Greenfield
2022 (75th)
2022 (75th)	The Lehman Trilogy	Stefano Massini	National Theatre, Neal Street Productions, Barry Diller, David Geffen, Kash Bennett, Lisa Burger, Caro Newling, Ambassador Theatre Group, Stephanie P. McClelland, Annapurna Theatre, Delman Whitney, Craig Balsam / Heni Koenigsberg / John Yonover, Fiery Angel / Seth A. Goldstein, Starry Night Entertainment, Gavin Kalin Productions, Paul and Selina Burdell / Bill Damaschke, 42nd.club / Phil and Claire Kenny, CatWenJam Productions, Amanda Dubois, Glass Half Full Productions, Dede Harris / Linda B. Rubin, Kallish Weinstein Creative, Kors Le Pere Theatricals LLC, James L. Nederlander, No Guarantees, Mark Pigott KBE, KStJ, Playing Field, Catherine Schreiber / Adam Zell, Tulchin Bartner Productions, Richard Winkler / Alan Shorr / Dawn Smalberg, The Shubert Organization, Independent Presenters Network, John Gore Organization, Sue Wagner, John Johnson and Jillian Robbins
2022 (75th)	Clyde's	Lynn Nottage	Second Stage Theater, Carole Rothman and Khady Kamara
2022 (75th)	Hangmen	Martin McDonagh	Robert Fox, Jean Doumanian, Elizabeth Ireland McCann, Craig Balsam, Atlantic Theater Company, Jon B. Platt, Len Blavatnik, Richard Fishman, John Gore Organization, Stephanie P. McClelland, David Mirvish, The Shubert Organization, Jamie deRoy / Sandy Robertson, Patrick Myles / Alexander 'Sandy' Marshall, M. Kilburg Reedy / Excelsior Entertainment, Playful Productions and Royal Court Theatre
2022 (75th)	The Minutes*	Tracy Letts	Jeffrey Richards, Rebecca Gold, Carl Moellenberg, Spencer Ross, Louise Gund, Elizabeth Armstrong, Blakeman Entertainment, HornosBerger, Across the River Productions, Stewart F. Lane / Bonnie Comley / Leah Lane, Jayne Baron Sherman, Kathleen K. Johnson, Emily Dobbs, Robert Flicker, Jacob Soroken Porter, The Shubert Organization and Steppenwolf Theatre Company
2022 (75th)	Skeleton Crew	Dominique Morisseau	Manhattan Theatre Club, Lynne Meadow and Barry Grove
2023 (76th)
2023 (76th)	Leopoldstadt	Tom Stoppard	Sonia Friedman Productions, Roy Furman, Lorne Michaels, Stephanie P. McClelland, Gavin Kalin, Delman Sloan, Eilene Davidson, Brad Edgerton, Patrick Gracey, Hunter Arnold, Burnt Umber Productions, Cue to Cue Productions, The Factor Gavin Partnership, Harris Rubin Productions, Robert Nederlander Jr., No Guarantees, Sandy Robertson, Iris Smith, Jamie deRoy / Catherine Adler, Dodge Hall Productions / Waverly Productions, Richardo Hornos / Robert Tichio, Heni Koenigsberg / Wendy Federman, Thomas S. Perakos / Stephanie Kramer, Brian Spector / Judith Seinfeld and Richard Winkler / Alan Shorr
2023 (76th)	Ain't No Mo'	Jordan E. Cooper	Lee Daniels, BET: Black Entertainment Television, Len Blavatnik, Ronald Burkle, Aryeh Bourkoff, 59th & Prairie Entertainment, RuPaul Charles, I'll Have Another Productions, Jeremy O. Harris, Lena Waithe, Tucker Tooley Entertainment, C. J. Uzomah, Ann Cox, Gina Purlia, Bob Yari, Marvin Peart, Colleen Camp, Marvet Britto, Jeremy Green, Sue Wagner, John Johnson, Jillian Robbins, The Public Theater, Oskar Eustis, Patrick Willingham and Mandy Hackett
2023 (76th)	Between Riverside and Crazy †	Stephen Adly Guirgis	Second Stage Theater, Carole Rothman, Khady Kamara and Atlantic Theater Company
2023 (76th)	Cost of Living †	Martyna Majok	Manhattan Theatre Club, Lynne Meadow, Barry Grove and Williamstown Theatre Festival
2023 (76th)	Fat Ham †	James Ijames	No Guarantees, Public Theater Productions, Rashad V. Chambers, National Black Theatre, Tim Levy, Bards on Broadway, Bob Boyett, Ghostbuster Productions, James Ijames, Cynthia Stroum, Audible, Adam Cohen, Blake Devillier, Firemused Productions / JamRock Productions, The Forstalls, Iconic Vizion / Corey Brunish, John Gore Organization, Midnight Theatricals, David Miner, Robin Gorman Newman / PickleStar Theatricals, Marc Platt, Play on Shakespeare, The Wilma Theater, Colman Domingo, Cynthia Erivo, Andy Jones, Dylan Pager, Roundabout Theatre Company, Oskar Eustis, Patrick Willingham, Mandy Hackett, Sade Lythcott and Jonathan McCrory
2024 (77th)
2024 (77th)	Stereophonic	David Adjmi	Sue Wagner, John Johnson, Seaview, Sonia Friedman Productions, Linden Productions, Ashley Melone, Nick Mills, Jillian Robbins, Stella La Rue, Alex Levy & David Aron, Dori Berinstein, James Bolosh, Burnt Umber Productions, The Cohn Sisters, Cathy Dantchik, Alexander R. Donnelly, Emerald Drive, Federman Koenigsberg, Dann Fink, Ruth Hendel, Larry Hirschhorn, Jenen Rubin, John Gore Organization, Willette & Manny Klausner, LAMF Protozoa, Katrina McCann, Stephanie P. McClelland, No Guarantees, Marissa Palley & Daniel Aron, Anna Schafer, Soto Namoff Productions, Sean Walsh, Bruce & Peggy Wanta, Hillary Wyatt, deRoy Howard, Winkler & Smalberg, 42nd.club, Craig Balsam, Concord Theatricals, Creative Partners Productions, Jonathan Demar, Douglas Denoff, DJD Productions, Echo Lake Entertainment, Faliro House, FilmNation Entertainment, Roy Gabay, GFour Productions, Candy Kosow Gold, Wes Grantom, Rachel Bendit & Mark Bernstein, Playwrights Horizons, Adam Greenfield, Leslie Marcus and Carol Fishman
2024 (77th)	Jaja's African Hair Braiding	Jocelyn Bioh	Manhattan Theatre Club, Lynne Meadow, Chris Jennings, Madison Wells Live, LaChanze and Taraji P. Henson
2024 (77th)	Mary Jane	Amy Herzog	Manhattan Theatre Club, Lynne Meadow and Chris Jennings
2024 (77th)	Mother Play	Paula Vogel	Second Stage Theater, Carole Rothman, Lisa Lawer Post, Salman and Vienn Al-Rashid, Courtney Lederer and Mark Thierfelder, Jerry and Roz Meyer, Alix L.L. Ritchie and Jayne Baron Sherman
2024 (77th)	Prayer for the French Republic	Joshua Harmon	Manhattan Theatre Club, Lynne Meadow and Chris Jennings
2025 (78th)
2025 (78th)	Purpose †	Branden Jacobs-Jenkins	David Stone, Debra Martin Chase, Marc Platt, LaChanze, Rashad V. Chambers, Aaron Glick, Universal Theatrical Group, Eastern Standard Time, Trate Productions, Nancy Nagel Gibbs, James L. Nederlander, John Gore, ATG Entertainment, The Shubert Organization and Steppenwolf Theatre Company
2025 (78th)	English †	Sanaz Toossi	Roundabout Theatre Company, Todd Haimes, Scott Ellis, Sydney Beers, Christopher Nave, Steven Showalter and Atlantic Theater Company
2025 (78th)	The Hills of California	Jez Butterworth	Sonia Friedman Productions, No Guarantees Productions, Neal Street Productions, Brian Spector, Sand & Snow Entertainment, Stephanie P. McClelland, Barry Diller, Reade St. Productions, Van Dean, Andrew Paradis / We R Broadway Artists Alliance, Patty Baker, Wendy Bingham Cox, Bob Boyett, Butcher Brothers, Caitlin Clements, Kallish Weinstein Creative, Michael Scott, Steven Toll & Randy Jones Toll, City Cowboy Productions / Jamie deRoy, JKVL Productions / Padgett Ross Productions, Koenigsberg Riley / Tulchin Bartner Productions, Todd B. Rubin / Carlos Medina, Silly Bears Productions / Omara Productions, Michael Wolk / Cali e Amici, Manhattan Theatre Club, Lynne Meadow and Chris Jennings
2025 (78th)	John Proctor Is the Villain	Kimberly Belflower	Sue Wagner, John Johnson, John Mara Jr., Runyonland, Eric Falkenstein, Jillian Robbins, Jen Hoguet, Rialto Productions, Corets Gough Kench Cohen, The Shubert Organization, James L. Nederlander, John Gore Organization, Patty Baker, Cue to Cue Productions, Echo Lake Entertainment, Harris Rubin Productions, Klausner & Zell, Jennifer Kroman, Mickey Liddell & Pete Shilaimon, Mahnster Productions, Nathan Winoto, The Cohn Sisters & Stifelman-Burkhardt, Astro Lab Productions, Creative Partners Productions, Sarah Daniels & Christopher Barrett, Frimmer & Benmosche, Joan Rechnitz, Melissa Chamberlain & Michael McCartney, Pam Hurst-Della Pietra & Stephen Della Pietra, McCaffrey & Demar, Alan & Peggy Mendelson, Newport & Smerigan, Jamie deRoy, Jaime Gleicher, Wes Grantom, Meena Harris & Jessica Foung, Los Angeles Media Fund, Corey Steinfast, SunnySpot & Valentine, Turchin Clements, Jane Bergère & Douglas Denoff, Amy Wen & Meister Leonard, 7th Inning Stretch & Stella La Rue, Indie Slingshot and Annaleise Loxton
2025 (78th)	Oh, Mary! *	Cole Escola	Kevin McCollum & Lucas McMahon, Mike Lavoie & Carlee Briglia, Bob Boyett, The Council, Jean Doumanian Productions, Nicole Eisenberg, Jay Marcus & George Strus, Irony Point, Richard Batchelder / Bradley Reynolds, Tyler Mount / Tommy Doyle, Nelson & Tao, Palomares & Rosenberg and ShowTown Productions
2026 (79th)
2026 (79th)	Liberation †	Bess Wohl	Daryl Roth, Eva Price, Rachel Sussman, Jenny Gersten, Betsy Dollinger, FineWomen Productions, Craig Balsam/Broadway Women's Fund, Jessica Goldman Foung/Rachel Styne, Michelle Noh/Todd B. Rubin, Gold Sky Productions, MHSSP Productions, Creative Partners Productions, Sheri Henriksen, Hopkins Haffner Wright, Pam Hurst-Della Pietra, Ellie Hurwitz, Willette Klausner, Hilary Ley Jager, Los Angeles Media Fund, Jonathan Littman, Isabelle Mann, Practical Mayhem, Jenna Segal, Tracy Semler, Marcy Syms, The Weisbrots, Roundabout Theatre Company, Scott Ellis, Sydney Beers and Christopher Nave
2026 (79th)	The Balusters	David Lindsay-Abaire	Manhattan Theatre Club, Nicki Hunter and Chris Jennings
2026 (79th)	Giant	Mark Rosenblatt	Brian & Dayna Lee, Stephanie Kramer & Nicole Kramer, Josh Fiedler & Robyn Goodman, Royal Court Theatre, Tilted, Federman Koenigsberg TS Perakos, Scott M. Delman & Timothy C. Headington, Stephanie P. McClelland, Jessica R. Jenen & Linda B. Rubin, Tom Smedes & Peter Stern, Mark Rubinstein LTD, Pam Hurst-Della Pietra & Stephen Della Pietra, Ruth Hendel, Daryl Roth, Tom Tuft, Four Front Productions, A Golden Ticket Production, Willette Klausner & Tom D'Angora, Kuhnsabi Furman Furie, Alex Levy & Shari Redstone, Oddly Specific Productions, Rialto Productions, Winkler & Smalberg, The Shubert Organization, James L. Nederlander and John Gore Organization
2026 (79th)	Little Bear Ridge Road	Samuel D. Hunter	Scott Rudin and Barry Diller

== Multiple wins ==
5 awards

- Tom Stoppard

2 awards

- Edward Albee
- Tony Kushner
- Arthur Miller
- Terrence McNally
- Yasmina Reza
- Peter Shaffer
- Neil Simon

== Multiple nominations ==
10 nominations

- Neil Simon

9 nominations

- August Wilson

8 nominations

- Tom Stoppard

6 nominations

- Edward Albee

5 nominations

- Martin McDonagh
- Arthur Miller

4 nominations

- Michael Frayn
- Athol Fugard
- John Osborne
- David Rabe
- Peter Shaffer
- Tennessee Williams

3 nominations

- Jean Anouilh
- Jez Butterworth
- Brian Friel
- John Guare
- David Hare
- Hugh Leonard
- David Lindsay-Abaire
- Terrence McNally
- Harold Pinter
- Lanford Wilson

2 nominations

- Ayad Akhtar
- Robert Bolt
- Paddy Chayefsky
- Harvey Fierstein
- Horton Foote
- Herb Gardner
- Richard Greenberg
- William Gibson
- Simon Gray
- Stephen Adly Guirgis
- Christopher Hampton
- David Henry Hwang
- William Inge
- Arthur Kopit
- Tony Kushner
- John Leguizamo
- Tracy Letts
- David Mamet
- Conor McPherson
- Sidney Michaels
- Peter Nichols
- William Nicholson
- Lynn Nottage
- Eugene O'Neill
- Mike Poulton
- Yasmina Reza
- Dore Schary
- Robert Schenkkan
- John Patrick Shanley
- Sam Shepard
- Simon Stephens
- David Storey
- Paula Vogel
- Wendy Wasserstein
- Bess Wohl

== Multiple awards and nominations ==
Awards	Nominations	Recipient
5	8	Tom Stoppard
2	10	Neil Simon
2	6	Edward Albee
2	5	Arthur Miller
2	4	Peter Shaffer
2	3	Terrence McNally
2	2	Tony Kushner
2	2	Yasmina Reza
1	9	August Wilson
1	4	Michael Frayn
1	4	John Osborne
1	4	David Rabe
1	4	Tennessee Williams
1	3	Jean Anouilh
1	3	Jez Butterworth
1	3	Brian Friel
1	3	Hugh Leonard
1	3	Harold Pinter
1	2	Robert Bolt
1	2	Harvey Fierstein
1	2	Herb Gardner
1	2	William Gibson
1	2	Richard Greenberg
1	2	David Henry Hwang
1	2	Tracy Letts
1	2	Eugene O'Neill
1	2	Dore Schary
1	2	Robert Schenkkan
1	2	John Patrick Shanley
1	2	Simon Stephens
1	2	Wendy Wasserstein
1	2	Bess Wohl

Awards	Nominations	Recipient
0	5	Martin McDonagh
0	4	Athol Fugard
0	3	John Guare
0	3	David Hare
0	3	David Lindsay-Abaire
0	3	Lanford Wilson
0	2	Ayad Akhtar
0	2	Paddy Chayefsky
0	2	Horton Foote
0	2	Simon Gray
0	2	Stephen Adly Guirgis
0	2	Christopher Hampton
0	2	William Inge
0	2	Arthur Kopit
0	2	John Leguizamo
0	2	David Mamet
0	2	Conor McPherson
0	2	Sidney Michaels
0	2	Peter Nichols
0	2	William Nicholson
0	2	Lynn Nottage
0	2	Mike Poulton
0	2	Sam Shepard
0	2	David Storey
0	2	Paula Vogel

== Superlatives ==
British writer Tom Stoppard has won this award five times, more than any other playwright. Only seven other writers (Arthur Miller, Terrence McNally, Tony Kushner, Edward Albee, Neil Simon, Yasmina Reza and Peter Shaffer) have won the award more than once, each winning twice.

With ten nominations, Neil Simon has been nominated for the award more than any other playwright. August Wilson, with nine nominations, comes in second, followed by Tom Stoppard (eight nominations), Edward Albee (six nominations), Arthur Miller (five nominations), and Martin McDonagh (five nominations).

In 1994, Tony Kushner became the first playwright to win consecutive Tony Awards for his two-part Angels in America: A Gay Fantasia on National Themes. Terrence McNally repeated this feat the following two years with his plays Love! Valour! Compassion! and Master Class.

== See also ==
- Tony Award for Best Revival of a Play
- Drama Desk Award for Outstanding Play
- Laurence Olivier Award for Best New Play
- Pulitzer Prize for Drama
- List of Tony Award-nominated productions
