= Glines =

Glines is a surname. Notable people with the surname include:

- Abbi Glines (born 1977), American novelist
- Edward Glines (1849–1917), American politician
- John Glines (1933–2018), American playwright and theater producer
- Shane Glines, American illustrator, animator, and character designer

== See also ==
- The Glines
- IRCd#G-line
