= Lawrence Lane =

Lawrence Lane (born March 1952) is a theatrical producer who is best known as one of the original producers of Harvey Fierstein's "Torch Song Trilogy". Lane, who served as Managing Director for The Glines, produced the play in 1978 with his lover John Glines, who served as the company's Artistic Director. The show was moved to Broadway with the help of producers Kenneth Weissman and Martin Markinson. The show opened at the Little Theatre, now the Helen Hayes, on June 10, 1982, and ran through May 19, 1985. The production won the 1983 Tony Award for Best Play and the 1983 Drama Desk Award for Outstanding New Play.

Lane was also one of the original producers of William B. Hoffman's play As Is. The play was originally produced by Circle Repertory Company and The Glines at Circle Repertory Theatre. It was moved to Broadway when Lucille Lortel and the Shubert Organization came on board as producers. The show opened at the Lyceum Theatre on May 1, 1985, and ran through January 4, 1986. The play won the 1985 Drama desk Award for Outstanding New Play. The production was also nominated for the 1985 Tony Award for Best Play.

Other plays he produced include Joseph Pintauro's "Wild Blue" and Michelle Morris'"Carla's Song". In 1993 he directed a production of Robert Patrick's "Meet Marvin" for The Glines.
