= Arthur Cantor =

American theatrical producer

Arthur Cantor (March 12, 1920 – April 8, 2001) was an accomplished American theatrical producer who contributed to the presentation of over 100 productions that were displayed on stages across the globe, including Broadway, Off-Broadway, London and Paris.

Many of his most notable productions were those he funded for comic playwrights, such as Paddy Chayefsky and Herb Gardner. Cantor was recognized for being a 'hands-on' producer, and was involved in nearly every stage of production, including managing the funding and all publicity for the shows. Considering he contributed to numerous Pulitzer Prize-winning productions, including the production of All the Way Home, his tactics for producing proved beneficial. His career was hoisted by his collaborations with some of Broadway's most reputable stars, such as: Colleen Dewhurst, Zero Mostel, Rex Harrison, Ingrid Bergman, Julie Harris, Eileen Atkins and Claire Bloom.

== Early life ==
Arthur Cantor was born to parents Samuel S. Cantor, who was a salesman, and Lillian Cantor, née Landsman. Having been raised in the Mattapan section of Boston, Cantor had his first theatre experience as a 4-year-old, when he attended a production at the local Yiddish playhouse.

Upon his graduation from Harvard in 1950, Cantor worked as a researcher for the Gallup Organization. His research position for the Gallup Organization was interrupted by his service for the Air Force in World War II. After his service in WWII, Cantor returned to the United States where he took a position as an assistant in the publicity department with the Playwrights Company. Joining the Playwrights company would prove to be quite fruitful for Cantor, as this venture instigated the rest of his career.

== Career ==
Cantor established his own agency, which was located in close proximity to Times Square in New York City, by the early 1950s. In 1951, Cantor handled the publicity for his first show - a comedy called Hook and Ladder, but it was not well received and only lasted one performance. It wasn't until 1955 when Cantor was successful with his work as a publicist, and the show Inherit the Wind is credited for giving him this success. Upon his initial success, the following four years were succeeded by a sequence of critical successes in handling the publicity for Broadway shows including, Long Day's Journey Into Night, Auntie Mame and The Miracle Worker.

1957 was a critical year for the progression of Cantor's career, as it was the year he first contributed to producing a theatre production. Cantor decided to invest $2,000 into a new musical about a 'charming con man in a Midwestern town' - this musical was later known as the Music Man. The production of Paddy Chayefsky's The Tenth Man, alongside producer Saint Subber, is the second notable work that is responsible for Cantor's respected status as a producer on Broadway. The work, which debuted on stage in 1959, had previously been rejected by countless producers for it told an unusual story of a young Jewish girl that was possessed by a demon. The Tenth Man, directed by Tyrone Guthrie, later went on to win the Pulitzer Prize for drama.

His successes continued through 1961, when he produced Chayefsky's Gideon as well Tad Mosel's All the way Home, the latter went on to later win a Pulitzer prize. Another great success for Cantor came a year later in 1962, when he produced Mr. Gardner's A Thousand Clowns, which starred Jason Robards.

In 1970, Arthur Cantor collaborated with Stuart W. Little, a theatre writer, to produce a work titled The Playmakers, which was a study of the theatre industry. As a fickle spender of money, Cantor grew increasingly frustrated and disturbed by the rising costs of Broadway. This resulted in a shift of his productions from Broadway to theatres Off-Broadway and around the globe, including London and Paris, because production costs were lower for these presentations. London and Off-Broadway were Cantor's major markets for the following couple decades. During this period, Cantor produced numerous notable works, including Private Lives, which starred Maggie Smith, and Hothouse, a work that was written by Harold Pinter. Cantor briefly returned to Broadway in 1979 to produce On Golden Pond. Although the Broadway production was not fruitful in terms of revenue, the project proved worthwhile when it was later made into an Academy Award-winning film, which starred Henry Fonda and Katharine Hepburn.

Partially incapacitated by a stroke that occurred in late 1998, Cantor's ability to work slowed but did not stop entirely. He was set to produce a piece, titled Scent of Roses, by South African writer Lisette Lecat Ross in the fall of 1999, but it was halted prior to reaching Broadway.
