= Elizabeth Ireland McCann =

American theatrical producer (1931–2021)

- Born: March 29, 1931; New York City
- Died: September 9, 2021 (aged 90); New York City
- Occupation: Theatrical producer

Elizabeth Ireland McCann (March 29, 1931 – September 9, 2021) was an American theatrical producer. She won nine Tony Awards and three Emmy Awards over a long career on Broadway.

== Early life ==
McCann was born in New York City, the daughter of Scottish-born Irish Catholic immigrants, Patrick McCann and Rebecca Henry McCann. She graduated from Manhattanville College in 1952, and earned a master's degree in English literature from Columbia University in 1954. In 1966 she completed a law degree at Fordham University.

== Career ==
McCann produced over 60 plays on Broadway, and won nine Tony Awards. She and her producing partner Nelle Nugent won Tony Awards in 1978 for Dracula (best revival), in 1979 for The Elephant Man (best play), in 1980 for Morning's at Seven (best revival), in 1981 for Amadeus, and in 1982 for The Life and Adventures of Nicholas Nickleby (best play). She won four more Tony Awards without Nugent: in 1998 for the revival of A View from the Bridge, in 2000 for Copenhagen, in 2002 for The Goat, or Who Is Sylvia?, and in 2009 for the revival of Hair. She also produced off-Broadway runs of Edward Albee's Three Tall Women and The Play About the Baby, and was general manager of the Big Apple Circus.

McCann was managing producer on the annual Tony Awards broadcast six times, in 2001 and from 2004 to 2008, and won three Emmy Awards for those shows. She produced several television adaptations of plays she'd produced, including Morning's at Seven (1982), Orpheus Descending (1990), and Passing Strange (2009).

McCann was inducted into American Theater Hall of Fame in 2004. In 2015, she gave an oral history interview for the Primary Stages Off-Broadway Oral History Project. Her last show, Hangmen starring Dan Stevens, was in previews in March 2020, when Broadway closed for the COVID-19 pandemic.

== Personal life ==
McCann died from cancer in 2021, aged 90 years, at a hospital in the Bronx. The records of McCann & Nugent Productions are in the Billy Rose Theatre Division of the New York Public Library.
