= Howard Mann =

American actor

- Born: Howard Mendelsohn; June 20, 1923; New York City, New York, U.S.
- Died: September 18, 2008 (aged 85); Los Angeles, California, U.S.
- Education: City College of New York
- Occupation(s): Actor, comedian

Howard Mann (June 20, 1923 – September 18, 2008) was an American actor and comedian. Mann appeared on television, film and commercials during his 40-year-long career in the entertainment industry. Some of his most recent roles in the 2000s included Pushing Daisies and The Starter Wife. Despite his dozens of film and television credits in his resume, Mann wrote that he had "probably been turned down more times than a blanket," in a guest column in the Los Angeles Times in 2006.

== Early life ==
Mann was born Howard Mendelsohn in 1923 in New York City. He graduated from the City College of New York and studied acting and comedy with Zero Mostel, Herbert Berghof, and William Hickey.

== Career ==
Mann began his career in entertainment as a comedian after being laid off from his job as an advertising copywriter. Mann began performing in the Jewish entertainers circuit in resorts in New York's Borscht Belt region in the Catskill Mountains. His dozens of television appearances included Laverne & Shirley, Alice, Moonlighting and Murder, She Wrote. His film credits included Mr. Saturday Night in 1992 and the History of the World: Part I in 1981. Mann also appeared on the Merv Griffin Show and The Tonight Show Starring Johnny Carson. On stage, Mann toured the United States in a one-man show, in which he played George Washington, in 1976 in honor of the United States Bicentennial. He later portrayed the role of Oscar Madison in an off Broadway production of The Odd Couple. Beginning in the 1980s, Mann created and performed an original rap routine for senior citizens living in the San Fernando Valley.

== Personal life ==
Mann died of cancer on September 18, 2008, at Cedars-Sinai Medical Center in Los Angeles at the age of 85. He was survived by his longtime girlfriend and companion, Bea Mitz.

== Filmography ==
=== Film ===
Year	Title	Role	Notes
1961	Blast of Silence	Body Guard	
1980	Wholly Moses!	High Priest	
1981	Going Ape!	Jules Cohen	
1981	History of the World, Part I	Disciple	
1982	O'Hara's Wife	Moving man	
1982	They Call Me Bruce?	Joe The Finger	
1992	Mr. Saturday Night	Stage Manager	
2001	The Medicine Show	Mr. Melanoma	
2003	Malibu's Most Wanted	Uncle Louie	

=== Television ===
Year	Title	Role	Notes
1959, 1963	Naked City	Officer Dorkin / Comptometer	2 episodes
1963, 1964	The Defenders	Police Sargeant / Patrolman Burke	2 episodes
1966	Hawk	Cop #1	Episode: "The Shivering Pigeon"
1978	Laverne & Shirley	The Grand Bass	Episode: "Playing the Roxy"
1978	Watch Your Mouth	Mr. Welsh	Episode: "Mary and Melvin"
1979	Salvage 1	Kramer	3 episodes
1979	The Misadventures of Sheriff Lobo	Henchman	Episode: "The Mob Comes to Orly"
1980	Alice	Customer / Trucker	3 episodes
1981	Barney Miller	Lou Carlisle	Episode: "Lady and the Bomb"
1981	Crazy Times	Mr. Candosta	Television film
1983	Inspector Perez	Dr. Mirakin	Television film
1983	American Playhouse	Thomas	Episode: "Wings"
1983	Happy	Councilman Brady	Television film
1984	The Jeffersons	Torqovich	Episode: "The Command Post"
1984	Murder, She Wrote	New Holvang Cabbie	Episode: "The Murder of Sherlock Holmes"
1985	Space	Lawyer / Tycoon	Episode: "Part III"
1985, 1987	Moonlighting	Gas Station Cashier / Man on Elevator	2 episodes
1986	Cagney & Lacey	Paddy	Episode: "DWI"
1986	Hunter	Side	Episode: "Fagin 1986"
1988	Hooperman	Man at Morgue	Episode: "The Naked and the Dead"
1988	Webster	Galileo	Episode: "Heaven"
1993	The Fresh Prince of Bel-Air	Mr. Gorodetsky	2 episodes
1997	Crisis Center	Mort Fishman	Episode: "It's a Family Affair"
1998	Seinfeld	Willie, Sr.	Episode: "The Dealership"
2000	Becker	Fred	Episode: "The Film Critic"
2001	Sabrina the Teenage Witch	Harvey, the Profit Prophet	Episode: "Making the Grade"
2001	Providence	Webster	Episode: "The Honeymoon's Over"
2001	Spin City	Anthony DeMatt	Episode: "Chinatown"
2002	The West Wing	Senior Citizen	Episode: "Election Night"
2002	The Bernie Mac Show	Mel	Episode: "The Sweet Life"
2003	CSI: Miami	Marty Gaines	Episode: "Bunk"
2003	Malcolm in the Middle	Elderly Man	Episode: "Day Care"
2004	Without a Trace	Garden Center Manager	Episode: "Shadows"
2006	I Did Not Know That	Thomas 'The Schnoz' Lipinski	Television film
2007	Pushing Daisies	Elderly Man	Episode: "The Fun in Funeral"
2008	The Starter Wife	Karl	3 episodes
