= The Dealership =

- Seinfeld episode
- Episode no.: Season 9 Episode 11
- Directed by: Andy Ackerman
- Written by: Steve Koren
- Production code: 911
- Original air date: January 8, 1998

Guest appearances
- Patrick Warburton as David Puddy; Daniel Hagen as Rick; Joel McCrary as Don; Michael Kagan as Willie; Dee Freeman as Service Assistant; Rif Hutton as Salesman; Howard Mann as Willie Sr.; Catherine Schreiber as Saleswoman; Steve Susskind as Customer #1; Loretta Fox as Customer #2; Deirdre Lovejoy as Customer #3 (uncredited); Steve Koren as Cab Driver (uncredited)

Episode chronology
← Previous "The Strike"	Next → "The Reverse Peephole"
- Seinfeld season 9

"The Dealership" is the 167th episode of the NBC sitcom Seinfeld. This was the 11th episode of the ninth and final season. It aired on January 8, 1998. This episode follows the characters' escapades at a car dealership, which Jerry is visiting in hopes of getting an insider deal on a new car through his friendship with David Puddy.

It was the first episode aired after Jerry Seinfeld announced on December 26, 1997 that the show would end in May.

== Plot ==
Jerry plans to buy a car with an insider deal from David Puddy, who has been promoted to car salesman. George gives Jerry tips to avoid being conned. Jerry complains to Elaine about Puddy's new habit of giving high fives, which he considers crude and primitive. Elaine passes on these criticisms to Puddy, leading them to break up. Jerry's insider deal becomes less favorable, as Puddy starts ringing up charges for extras.

Kramer tells a salesman, Rick, that he makes the car buying decisions for Jerry and demands a test drive. Kramer gives the car a full test of a Kramer daily routine, testing the limits of its fuel tank (as he often drives at near empty when borrowing Jerry's car, to avoid paying for gas). Rick is thrilled when they get the gasoline needle below the red line. With the dealership in sight, they drive on to see how far they can go. The car finally runs out of gas. Kramer exits the car and leaves without taking Rick's business card.

George borrows a dollar from Jerry to buy a Twix candy bar from a vending machine, but the machine rejects the crinkled bill. He asks a mechanic for change; the mechanic says he has none. George inserts change collected from under the vending machine, but the Twix bar catches on its ring. George seeks assistance from a salesman. When they return to the machine, the dangling Twix bar and the one behind it are gone. George sees the mechanic eating them, but he claims it was a 5th Avenue bar.

Jerry enlists George's tough negotiating skills to bargain with Puddy, but all George can think about is the Twix bar. George complains to the manager about the mechanic, then sets up a ten-candy bar lineup in order to prove the mechanic cannot tell a Twix bar from a 5th Avenue bar, only to find his lineup being eaten by the dealership staff. Irritated by their incorrect guesses at what they are eating, he reveals that the entire lineup was Twix bars, in an attempt to set up the mechanic. To get a great deal on his car, Jerry reconciles Elaine and Puddy. Puddy agrees to give Jerry a great deal, but Jerry loses it by refusing Puddy a high five. Jerry, George, and Elaine take a cab ride home.

== Reception ==
In a 2012 retrospective review for The A.V. Club, David Sims argued that "The Dealership" is representative of a subtle drop in quality that Seinfeld experienced in its ninth season. Comparing it to two similar episodes from Seinfeld's earliest seasons, "The Chinese Restaurant" and "The Parking Garage", he opined that it lacks their brilliance because its scenarios are more bizarre. He particularly criticized the George story, noting that despite the story centering on George's inability to get a Twix bar, he suddenly acquires ten of them with no explanation, and instead of eating them he uses them in an incomprehensible scheme. He summed up that the episode, though still "laugh-out-loud funny", makes the viewer miss Seinfeld's earlier years.
