= The Will Rogers Follies =

- Original Broadway Playbill
- Music: Cy Coleman
- Lyrics: Betty Comden; Adolph Green
- Book: Peter Stone
- Productions: 1991 Broadway
- Awards: Tony Award for Best Musical; Tony Award for Best Score

The Will Rogers Follies is a musical with a book by Peter Stone, lyrics by Betty Comden and Adolph Green, and music by Cy Coleman.

It focuses on the life and career of humorist and performer Will Rogers, using as a backdrop the Ziegfeld Follies, which he often headlined, and describes episodes in his life in the form of production numbers. The Rogers character also performs rope tricks in between scenes. The revue contains snippets of Rogers' "homespun" style of wisdom.

== Synopsis ==
Act I

Rogers frequently speaks directly to the audience and to Florenz Ziegfeld himself, who often interjects to question the progress of the show and to give some directorial advice. After introducing the audience to his friends and family, Rogers discusses leaving home at 19 to become a cowboy in Argentina. Ziegfeld tells Rogers that he must "meet the girl". Although Rogers met Betty Blake at a train station, Ziegfeld creates a more "theatrical" meeting by having her lowered romantically from the Moon.

Because Betty is eager to marry Rogers, the show moves forward several years to a time when Rogers is playing in a small Wild West revue. The couple is about to be married, but Ziegfeld interrupts, saying that the wedding has to be delayed, because it must occur in the first act finale. So, as Rogers' success continues to grow, he and Betty travel around the country performing and produce four children. Rogers gets his big break when he is invited to join the Ziegfeld Follies and, by the early 1910s, he is a big vaudeville and radio star. He is about to leave for Hollywood to start a career in film, when it is at last time for the finale and the wedding.

Act II

Rogers is at the zenith of his popularity, the country's biggest and highest paid star of every medium of his time– stage, screen, radio, newspapers, and public appearances– and is even asked to run for president. This doesn't leave him much time for Betty, and she begins to feel neglected and starts singing the blues. Rogers comes home with "a treasury of precious jewels," and all is forgiven. The good mood doesn't last long, however, as bill collectors and creditors come knocking at the door. Ziegfeld has lost his fortune, and the Great Depression is in full swing. Herbert Hoover asks Rogers to give a speech to the nation. Rogers also reconciles with his estranged father. The show ends with the fatal plane ride in Alaska that Rogers shares with Wiley Post, a character whose cheerful invitation, "Let's go flyin' Will!" is heard throughout the show.

== Songs ==
Act I

- Prelude - "Let's Go Flying" - Chorus
- "Will-a-Mania" - Ziegfeld's Favorite and Chorus
- "Give a Man Enough Rope" - Will and Ziegfeld's cowboys
- "It's a Boy!" - Clem and Girls Sextet (Will's sisters)
- "It's a Boy! (Reprise)" - Clem
- "My Unknown Someone" - Betty Blake
- "The St. Louis Fair" - Girls Sextet (Betty's sisters)
- "The Big Time" - Will, Betty, Will Jr., Mary, James, and Freddy
- "My Big Mistake" - Betty Blake
- "The Powder Puff Ballet" - Ziegfeld Girls
- "Marry Me Now" - Will, Betty, and Ensemble
- "I Got You" - Will, Betty and Ensemble

Act II

- "Give a Man Enough Rope (Reprise)" - Will and Ziegfeld's cowboys
- "Look Around" - Will Rogers
- "Our Favorite Son" - Will, Ziegfeld's Favorite, Ziegfeld Girls, and Ziegfeld's cowboys
- "No Man Left For Me" - Betty Blake
- "Presents for Mrs. Rogers" - Will and Ziegfeld's cowboys
- "Never Met a Man I Didn't Like" - Will Rogers
- "Will-a-Mania (Reprise)" - Clem, Will, and Chorus
- "Without You" - Betty Blake
- "Never Met a Man I Didn't Like (Reprise)" - Will and Chorus

== Original cast and characters ==
Character	Broadway (1991)
Will Rogers	Keith Carradine
Betty Blake-Rogers	Dee Hoty
Clem Rogers	Dick Latessa
Ziegfeld's Favorite	Cady Huffman
Unicyclist/Roper	Vince Bruce
Wiley Post	Paul Ukena Jr.
Mary Rogers	Tammy Minoff
Freddy Rogers	Gregory Scott Carter
Jimmy Rogers	Lance Robinson
Will Rogers Jr.	Rick Faugno

== Productions ==
After thirty-three previews, the Broadway production opened on May 1, 1991, at the Palace Theatre, and closed on September 5, 1993 after 981 performances. Directed and choreographed by Tommy Tune, the original cast included Keith Carradine as Rogers, Dee Hoty as Betty Blake, Dick Latessa as Will's father Clem, and Cady Huffman as Ziegfeld's favorite chorus girl. Replacements later in the run included Mac Davis and Larry Gatlin as Rogers, Mickey Rooney as Clem, and Susan Anton and Marla Maples as Ziegfeld's favorite chorus girl. The recorded voice of Gregory Peck was heard as Ziegfeld.

The original choice of the authors to play Will Rogers was John Denver, but, due to a perceived insult from librettist Peter Stone, Denver bowed out of consideration for casting.

The show also enjoyed a number of national tours, with Carradine, Davis, and Gatlin in the first National tour in 1993 and 1994. Pat Boone starred in the musical in Branson, Missouri in 1994. The role of Betty (his wife) was played by Marylee Graffeo(Fairbanks). Variety noted that "Broadway Came To Branson with the bow of the 'Will Rogers Follies: A Life in Review' in the new Will Rogers Theater last Saturday...Pat Boone is a solid hit in Branson as Will Rogers in the 'Follies.'" The music was not live but digitalized.

== Awards and nominations ==
=== Original Broadway production ===
Year	Award	Category	Nominee	Result
1991	Tony Award	Best Musical	Pierre Cossette, Martin Richards, Sam Crothers, James M. Nederlander, Stewart F. Lane, Max Weitzenhoffer	Won
1991	Tony Award	Best Book of a Musical	Peter Stone	Nominated
1991	Tony Award	Best Original Score	Cy Coleman, Betty Comden and Adolph Green	Won
1991	Tony Award	Best Performance by a Leading Actor in a Musical	Keith Carradine	Nominated
1991	Tony Award	Best Performance by a Leading Actress in a Musical	Dee Hoty	Nominated
1991	Tony Award	Best Performance by a Featured Actress in a Musical	Cady Huffman	Nominated
1991	Tony Award	Best Direction of a Musical	Tommy Tune	Won
1991	Tony Award	Best Choreography	Tommy Tune	Won
1991	Tony Award	Best Scenic Design	Tony Walton	Nominated
1991	Tony Award	Best Costume Design	Willa Kim	Won
1991	Tony Award	Best Lighting Design	Jules Fisher	Won
1991	Drama Desk Award	Outstanding Musical		Won
1991	Drama Desk Award	Outstanding Actor in a Musical	Keith Carradine	Nominated
1991	Drama Desk Award	Outstanding Choreography	Tommy Tune	Won
1991	Drama Desk Award	Outstanding Orchestrations	Billy Byers	Nominated
1991	Drama Desk Award	Outstanding Music	Cy Coleman	Won
1991	New York Drama Critics' Circle Awards	Best Musical	Cy Coleman, Betty Comden, Adolph Green and Peter Stone	Won
