= Catherine Adler =

American Broadway producer

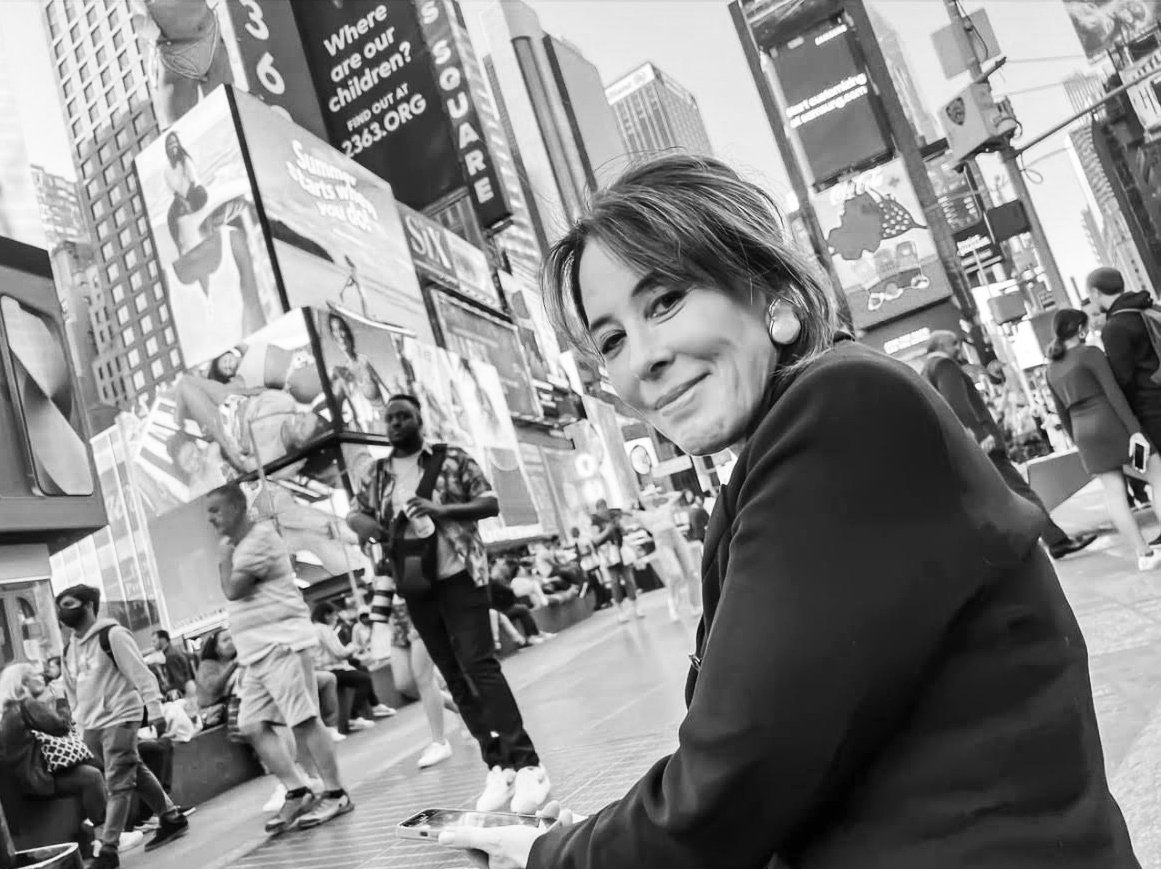
- Occupation: Broadway producer
- Awards: 9 Tony Awards 1 Olivier Award
- Website: www.catherineadlerproductions.com

Catherine Adler is an American Broadway producer who has won 9 Tony Awards and 1 Olivier Award.

== Biography ==
She began producing Broadway plays and musicals in 2013. Her first production credit was on Vanya and Sonia and Masha and Spike, which won the Tony Award for Best Play in 2013. That year, she also began producing A Gentleman's Guide to Love and Murder and remained on as producer during its first national tour. The original production won the Tony Award for Best Musical in 2014.

Also that year, she was a producer on the revival of The Elephant Man which starred Bradley Cooper and Patricia Clarkson and had productions on both Broadway and the West End. The Elephant Man was one of three Adler-produced revivals to be nominated for a Tony in 2015 alongside This Is Our Youth and Skylight, the latter of which ultimately won the award. Throughout 2016 and 2017, she produced several Off-Broadway plays including, The Flick, Small Mouth Sounds, and Baghdaddy. She returned to Broadway later in 2017, producing Steve Martin's Meteor Shower (among others).

In 2018, she produced the Broadway revival of Angels in America which would go on to win the Tony Award for Best Revival of a Play that year. As part of CatWenJam Productions, she produced Network, which starred Bryan Cranston. In addition to the aforementioned The Ferryman, Adler produced the Broadway runs for both Tootsie and Be More Chill in 2019.

In 2019 Adler won the Tony Award for Best Play for producing The Ferryman and the Laurence Olivier Award for Best Musical Revival for producing Marianne Elliott's West End production of Company.

In 2020 Adler produced the Tony Award for Best Musical nominee Tina: The Tina Turner Musical as well as Marianne Elliott's Broadway revival of Stephen Sondheim's Company.

From 2021 to present, Adler produced the Tony Award-winning Broadway productions of The Lehman Trilogy (Best Play, 2022), Company (Best Revival of a Musical, 2022), and Leopoldstadt (Best Play, 2023). She also co-produced the Broadway premiere of Thoughts of a Colored Man in 2021, the original musical Swept Away, which opened at the Longacre Theatre in 2024 and Robert Icke's reimagining of Oedipus, which played Studio 54 in the fall of 2025..

== Production credits ==
Year	Title	Dates	Venue	Notes
2013	Vanya and Sonia and Masha and Spike	March 14 – August 25, 2013	John Golden Theatre	Tony Award for Best Play
2013	After Midnight	November 3, 2013 – June 29, 2014	Brooks Atkinson Theatre	
2013	A Gentleman's Guide to Love and Murder	November 17, 2013 – January 17, 2016	Walter Kerr Theatre (and national tour)	Tony Award for Best Musical
2014	The Velocity of Autumn	April 21, 2014 – May 4, 2014	Booth Theatre	
2014	This Is Our Youth	September 11, 2014 – January 4, 2015	Cort Theatre	
2014	Wiesenthal	October 24, 2014 – February 1, 2015	Acorn Theatre	Off-Broadway
2014	Side Show	November 17, 2014 – January 4, 2015	St. James Theatre	
2014	A Delicate Balance	November 20, 2014 – February 22, 2015	John Golden Theatre	
2014	The Elephant Man	December 7, 2014 – February 21, 2015	Booth Theatre	Broadway
2014	The Elephant Man	May 19 – August 8, 2015	Theatre Royal Haymarket	West End
2015	Fish in the Dark	March 5 – August 1, 2015	Cort Theatre	
2015	Skylight	April 2 – June 21, 2015	John Golden Theatre	Tony Award for Best Revival of a Play
2015	The Flick	May 18, 2015 – January 10, 2016	Barrow Street Theatre	Off-Broadway
2015	On Your Feet!	November 5, 2015 – August 20, 2017	Marquis Theatre (and national tour)	
2016	Bright Star	March 24 – June 26, 2016	Cort Theatre	
2016	Exit Strategy	April 13 – May 6, 2016	Cherry Lane Theatre	Off-Broadway
2016	The Forgotten Woman	May 31 – June 19, 2019	Bay Street Theater (Sag Harbor, NY)	Regional
2016	Small Mouth Sounds	July 13 – October 9, 2016	Pershing Square Signature Center	Off-Broadway
2016	Butler	July 27 – August 28, 2016	59E59 Theaters	Off-Broadway
2016	The Roads to Home	October 5 – November 27, 2016	Cherry Lane Theatre	Off-Broadway
2017	Baghdaddy	May 1 – June 25, 2017	St. Luke's Theatre	Off-Broadway
2017	1984	June 22 – October 8, 2017	Hudson Theatre	
2017	Meteor Shower	November 29, 2017 – January 21, 2018	Booth Theatre	
2018	Angels in America	March 25 – July 15, 2018	Neil Simon Theatre	Tony Award for Best Revival of a Play
2018	The Ferryman	October 21, 2018 – July 7, 2019	Bernard B. Jacobs Theatre	Tony Award for Best Play
2018	Network	December 6, 2018 – June 8, 2019	Belasco Theatre	
2019	Be More Chill	March 10 – August 11, 2019	Lyceum Theatre	
2019	Tootsie	April 23, 2019 – January 5, 2020	Marquis Theatre	
2019	The Inheritance	November 17, 2019 - March 11, 2020	Ethel Barrymore Theater	Tony Award for Best Play
2020	Tina: The Tina Turner Musical	November 7, 2019 – Present	Lunt-Fontanne Theatre	
2021	Thoughts of a Colored Man	October 13, 2021 - December 22, 2021	Golden Theater	Closed early due to COVID
2021	Company	December 9, 2021 - July 31, 2022	Bernard B. Jacobs Theatre	Tony Award for Best Revival of A Musical
2021	The Lehman Trilogy	October 14, 2021 - January 2, 2022	Nedelander Theater	Tony Award for Best Play
2022	Leopoldstadt	October 2, 2022 - July 2, 2023	Longacre Theater	Tony Award for Best Play
2024	Swept Away	November 19, 2024 - December 29, 2024	Longacre Theater	
2025	Call Me Izzy	June 12, 2025 - August 24, 2025	Studio 54	
2025	13 Going on 30	September 21, 2025 - October 12, 2025	Manchester Opera House	
2025	Oedipus	October 30, 2025 - February 8, 2026	Studio 54	
2026	About Time	February 27, 2026 - April 5, 2026	Marjorie S. Deane Little Theater	Off-Broadway
2026	Celebrity Autobiography	May 16, 2026 - August 16, 2026	Shubert Theatre	
2026	13 Going on 30 (musical)	December 1, 2026 - January 24, 2027	Ed Mirvish Theatre	
2027	Evita	March 25, 2027 -	Winter Garden Theatre	
2027	Damn Yankees	April 20, 2027 -	Marquis Theatre	

== Nominations and Awards ==
Year	Award	Category	Nominee(s)	Result	Ref.
2013	Tony Award	Best Play	Vanya and Sonia and Masha and Spike	Won	
2014	Tony Award	Best Musical	A Gentleman's Guide to Love and Murder	Won	
2014	Tony Award	Best Musical	After Midnight	Nominated	
2015	Tony Award	Best Revival of a Play	This Is Our Youth	Nominated	
2015	Tony Award	Best Revival of a Play	The Elephant Man	Nominated	
2015	Tony Award	Best Revival of a Play	Skylight	Won	
2016	Tony Award	Best Musical	Bright Star	Nominated	
2018	Tony Award	Best Revival of a Play	Angels in America	Won	
2019	Tony Award	Best Play	The Ferryman	Won	
2019	Tony Award	Best Musical	Tootsie	Nominated	
2019	Olivier Award	Best Musical Revival	Company	Won	
2020	Tony Award	Best Musical	Tina: The Tina Turner Musical	Nominated	
2020	Tony Award	Best Play	The Inheritance	Won	
2022	Tony Award	Best Revival of a Musical	Company	Won	
2022	Tony Award	Best Play	The Lehman Trilogy	Won	
2023	Tony Award	Best Play	Leopoldstadt	Won	
2026	Tony Award	Best Revival of a Play	Oedipus	Nominated	
