= As Is (play) =

1985 play written by William M. Hoffman

- Cover from TV video production
- Original language: English
- Written by: William M. Hoffman
- Characters: Saul; Rich; Nurse; Chet; Barney; Brother; Lily; Pat
- Genre: Drama
- Setting: New York City

Premiere
- Date: 10 March 1985
- Place: Circle Repertory Theatre; New York City

As Is is a 1985 American play written by William M. Hoffman. The play was first produced by Circle Repertory Company and The Glines and directed by Marshall W. Mason. It opened on March 10, 1985, at the Circle Rep in New York City, where it ran for 49 performances.

The Broadway production, produced by John Glines, Lawrence Lane, Lucille Lortel, and the Shubert Organization, opened on May 1, 1985, at the Lyceum Theatre, where it ran for 285 performances following six previews. The cast included Robert Carradine, Jonathan Hadary, Jonathan Hogan, Lou Liberatore, Ken Kliban, and Claris Erickson.

A London production, directed by Chris Bond and starring George Costigan and David Fielder, ran from 18 August until 26 September 1987 at the Half Moon Theatre. A percentage of the income from the production was donated to the Terrence Higgins Trust.

== Synopsis ==
As Is portrays the effect that AIDS, a relatively new epidemic in the 1980s, has on a group of friends living in New York City. It was one of the early plays, and subsequent TV movies, depicting how the epidemic was affecting gay Americans. As Is opened shortly before Larry Kramer's play The Normal Heart.

This play depicts a gay couple, Saul and Richard, who open the play, and their separation. Rich's firm decision to separate is reversed when he returns to Saul after contracting AIDS from his new lover. Seeking emotional support, Rich shows how people with AIDS were treated by the American family, doctors, and friends. Their impersonal and detached attitudes lead Rich to recognize the importance of the partner for the person with AIDS.

The play begins, and ends, with a monologue by a middle-aged, female hospice worker, describing her new patient, Richard. In the second scene, Saul, one of the two main characters, states that he is Jewish while arguing about possessions with Richard, who makes an antisemitic remark and reveals he has AIDS during their ongoing breakup. After Richard's illness worsens, he reconciles with his brother but ultimately asks Saul to buy street drugs so he can use them to kill himself. Saul agrees to do so but has a change of heart after seeing a neon sign from the window of an adult film store. He becomes convinced, and then attempts to convince Richard, that they must find as much joy as possible in the remainder of his life. Before the final monologue of the hospice worker, Saul climbs into Richard's hospital bed for safe sex.

== Development ==
Hoffman began writing As Is in 1982 following the death of four friends from AIDS. Worried that the topic of a friend's death would be too "grisly" for a stage production, he centered it on the two lovers. Although As Is and The Normal Heart were among the first dramatic works about AIDS, the first play about AIDS in New York City was Night Sweat by Robert Chesley, which premiered in May 1984 at the Meridan Gay Theater. What is said to be the "first professionally produced play" concerning AIDS is One by Jeff Hadedorn, which ran in Chicago in 1983.

Hoffman compared the stories he had heard of people with AIDS having been abandoned by their friends and family, as well as being mistreated by healthcare workers, to the stories he had heard about the Holocaust, in which most of his family in Europe had been murdered.

== Reception ==
The play was critiqued for reinforcing the trope of the steadfast partner who doubles as bedside nurse that was common to AIDS performances. It included scenes based in Hoffman's experience as a gay man in the 1980s: where each member of Rich and Saul's friend group were when they first heard of what would be known as AIDS; answering phones at an AIDS hotline; support groups for people with HIV/AIDS. Hoffman's portrayal of a person with AIDS as both a sexual partner and a person deserving of pleasure without shame was a significant break from the prevailing ideology of people with AIDS as both diseased and pariahs.

Although the play addressed numerous AIDS issues and debunked myths surrounding AIDS, it was not overtly political or critical of institutional, overarching structures that sustained the spread of HIV, unlike The Normal Heart, which closed at the Public only one month after its opening. As Is became a critical and commercial success, including a positive review as "the best new play of the season" by theater reviewer John Simon writing for New York Magazine. Although not provocative, As Is legitimized "AIDS theater" as both critically and commercially viable which led to investments in dramatic works about AIDS by leading producers that mainstreamed awareness to a general audience beyond the lesbian and gay community.

== Film adaptation ==
In 1986, Hoffman adapted the play for a television production directed by Michael Lindsay-Hogg starring Hadary, Carradine, and Colleen Dewhurst. Both Hadary and Carradine were nominated for CableACE Awards.

== Awards and nominations ==
Awards

- 1985 Drama Desk Award for Outstanding New Play

Nominations

- 1985 Tony Award for Best Play

== Revivals ==
In 2010, New York's Apple Core Theater Company produced a revival. The play also was produced at London's Finborough Theatre, directed by Andrew Keates. The London production was named critics' choice by the London edition of Time Out magazine, and transferred to the Trafalgar Studios in 2015.
