= Doris Abrahams =

American theater producer

Doris Cole Abrahams
- Born: 29 January 1921
- Died: February 17, 2009 (aged 88)
- Occupation: Theater producer
- Known for: Winning 2 Tony Awards for Peter Shaffer's play Equus and Tom Stoppard's Travesties

Doris Cole Abrahams (January 29, 1921 – February 17, 2009) was a theater producer who won two Tony Awards for Peter Shaffer's play Equus and Tom Stoppard's Travesties.

== Biography ==
Doris Cole was born in the Bronx to a magician father who ran a magic store. She grew up in Manhattan and Brookline, Massachusetts, and started in theater by sweeping stage floors and acting in summer stock performances. In 1945, while still in her teens, she became the producer of Blue Holiday, an all-black Broadway variety show that ran for eight performances at the Belasco Theater, starring Katherine Dunham, Ethel Waters and Josh White.

== Career ==
She married Gerald M. Abrahams, the chairman of the luxury clothing manufacturer Aquascutum and returned with him to London. There, the elaborate parties she prepared for her husband's clients allowed her to join with Oscar Lewenstein Productions, where she was involved with plays such as Semi-Detached with Laurence Olivier, as well as the Albert Finney vehicles Billy Liar as Luther. She started Albion Productions in the mid-1960s, putting on a total of eight plays in the West End theatre, among them Tom Stoppard's Enter a Free Man in 1968 and Travesties in 1974.

Returning to New York City and Broadway in 1974, she co-produced Equus with Kermit Bloomgarden at the Plymouth Theatre. Starring Anthony Hopkins as the psychiatrist with a patient who has a pathological obsession with horses, it was honored as best play at the 29th Tony Awards and the Tony Award for Best Direction of a Play went to John Dexter. Her 1975 Broadway production of Travesties, co-produced with Burry Fredrik and David Merrick, won that year's Tony Award for best play.

== Personal life ==
Abrahams died there at age 88 on February 17, 2009, due to heart failure in Manhattan. She was survived by two daughters, two grandchildren and two great-grandchildren. Her husband had died in 1999.
