= Max Weitzenhoffer =

American producer

Max Weitzenhoffer (born October 30, 1939) is an American theatre producer living in Oklahoma. He is known for his theatrical productions, philanthropic and contribution to the theater industry. He was inducted into the Oklahoma Hall of Fame in 1994.

== Early life and education ==
Weitzenhoffer was born October 30, 1939.

He earned an honorary doctorate in 2000 in addition to a bachelor's degree in fine arts in 1961 from University of Oklahoma.

== Professional career ==
Weitzenhoffer started his professional life as a co-manager of the La Jolla Playhouse in California in 1963 and 1964. In 1969, he co-founded Gimpel & Weitzenhoffer Ltd., beginning his journey as a producer. His Broadway productions include "Dracula," which earned him a Tony Award in 1978. His success continued with "The Will Rogers Follies," for which he received another Tony Award in 1991.

Weitzenhoffer's collection includes A Little Night Music, A Moon for the Misbegotten, and Medea. He made Broadway and the West End through collaborations with artists like Kevin Spacey, Christian Slater, and Kathleen Turner.

In addition to producing, Weitzenhoffer co-founded Nimax Theatres. He also co-owns major venues with Nica Burns, including the Palace, Lyric, Apollo, Garrick, Vaudeville, and Duchess Theatres.

=== Awards and recognition ===
- Tony Award for Dracula (1978)
- Tony Award for "The Will Rogers Follies (1991)
- Inducted into the Oklahoma Hall of Fame (1994)
- Albert Nelson Marquis Lifetime Achievement Award by Marquis Who's Who (2019)
- John and Joy Reed Belt Award (2023)

== Personal life ==
Weitzenhoffer lives in Oklahoma.
