= The Glines =

Founded in 1976 by John Glines, Barry Laine and Jerry Tobin, The Glines is an American not-for-profit organization based in New York City, New York, devoted to creating and presenting gay art to develop positive self-images and dispel negative stereotyping.

== Awards ==
- In 1983, The Glines production of Harvey Fierstein's Torch Song Trilogy won Tony Awards for Best Play and Best Actor.
- The Glines/Circle Repertory Company co-production of William M. Hoffman's As Is won the 1985 Drama Desk Award for Best Play and was Tony-nominated for Best Play, Best Director and Best Actor.
- The Glines/PSX production of Howard Crabtree's Whoop-Dee-Doo! won the 1994 Drama Desk Award for Best Musical Revue and Best Costume Design.

== Productions ==
Other notable successes produced by The Glines include:

- Jane Chambers’s Last Summer at Bluefish Cove, My Blue Heaven and The Quintessential Image
- Doric Wilson’s A Perfect Relationship and Forever After
- Victor Bumbalo’s Niagara Falls
- Richard Hall’s Love Match
- Sydney Morris’s If This Isn’t Love! and The Wind Beneath My Wings
- Arch Brown’s Newsboy and Sex Symbols
- Joseph Pintauro’s Wild Blue
- Anthony Bruno’s Soul Survivor
- Robert Patrick’s T-Shirts and Untold Decades
- Tom Wilson Weinberg’s musical Get Used to It!
- An Evening With Quentin Crisp
- a number of plays by John Glines, including On Tina Tuna Walk, Men Of Manhattan, Body And Soul and Murder In Disguise
- plus the First and Second Gay American Arts Festivals in 1980 and 1981.

A benefit in 1982 was given by The Glines was at The Town Hall, a performance space in New York City, consisting of three one-act plays: The Quintessential Image by Jane Chambers (with Peg Murray in the title role), Forget Him by Harvey Fierstein (with Harvey Fierstein, Estelle Getty and Court Miller), and A Loss of Memory by Arthur Laurents (with Richard DeFabees, who played Arnold in matinée performances of Torch Song Trilogy).

The Glines broke into television in 1986 with its acclaimed production of Hero of My Own Life, a documentary on the life of a person living with AIDS.

=== Artists ===
Among the many artists who have appeared (or whose work has appeared) with The Glines are:

Caroline Aaron
Alvin Baltrop
Pat Bond
Matthew Broderick
Charles Busch
Thomas Calabro
Andrea Dworkin
Harvey Fierstein
Estelle Getty
Allen Ginsberg
Judy Grahn

Jonathan Hadary
Lou Liberatore
Audre Lorde
Dan Lauria
Armistead Maupin
Mark Morris
Park Overall
Felice Picano
James Purdy
John Rechy

Ned Rorem
Mercedes Ruehl
Vito Russo
Richard Skipper
Jean Smart
Fisher Stevens
Robin Tyler
Edmund White
Jack Wrangler
