= Catherine Schreiber =

American theatre producer

Award Winning American Theater Producer

Catherine Schreiber is a five-time Tony Award-winning and a one-time Olivier Award-winning Broadway producer.

Her Tony Awards include: Company (2022), The Lehman Trilogy, The Inheritance, Angels in America, and Clybourne Park . She is best known for Company (2022) and Scottsboro Boys (2011).

== Career ==
She was named the Broadway Global Producer of the Year in 2017 and has received 11 Tony Nominations and 5 Olivier Nominations. She has also won an Evening Standard Award and a London Outer Critics' Circle Award for The Scottsboro Boys. Producing credits include Disney's High School Musical (UK), RENT (UK) Burlesque (UK), Here There are Blueberries (Broadway), Cabaret (Broadway), Wyld Woman: The Legend of Shy Girl (UK), Company (Broadway), The Lion, the Witch, and the Wardrobe (UK), The Play that Goes Wrong (Off-Broadway and Tour), Pretty Woman (UK and Tour), and Fiddler on the Roof (Tour). Schreiber is also the creator and interview host of Broadway and Beyond TV for Reach TV.

== Biography ==
Schreiber was born in Queens, New York, and grew up in Great Neck, Nassau County, New York (on Long Island).

After Yale College (where she was inducted into Phi Beta Kappa, and graduated magna cum laude, with Honors in English), she worked Off-Broadway in New York as an actress and then moved to Los Angeles, where she got married and raised her children.

An actress, producer, and writer, she has had scripts in development with Disney, Sony, and Tom Mount, and a TV series with CBS.

She is also a member of the Broadway League, the Professional League of Women's Producers, and was a former Founder of the Center Theatre Group, Los Angeles. In 2012, Schreiber received the Key to the City of Scottsboro, Alabama for her work with the Scottsboro Boys Museum.

In 2013, Schreiber gave the keynote address when Governor Bentley of Alabama signed The Scottsboro Boys Act exonerating the Scottsboro Boys.

== Awards and nominations ==
- Tony Winner: Company - 2022
- Tony Winner: The Lehman Trilogy - 2022
- Drama Desk Award: Company - 2022
- Outer Critics Circle Award: Company - 2022
- Outer Critics Circle Award: The Lehman Trilogy - 2022
- GLAAD Media Award: Company - 2022
- Tony Winner: The Inheritance - 2021
- GLAAD Media Award: The Inheritance - 2020
- Drama League Award: The Inheritance - 2020
- Outer Critics Circle Award: The Inheritance - 2020
- Drama Desk Award: A Christmas Carol - 2020
- Olivier Winner: Company - 2019
- Tony Winner: Angels in America - 2018
- Drama Desk Award: Angels in America - 2018
- Broadway Global Producer of the Year - 2017
- Tony Winner: Clybourne Park - 2012
- Tony Nominee: Fiddler on the Roof - 2016
- Tony Nominee: Clybourne Park - 2012, Peter and the Starcatcher - 2012
- Tony Nominee: The Scottsboro Boys - 2011
- LONDON: Total of SEVEN Nominations in 2014 and 2015, The Olivier Awards
- Tony Nominee: Next Fall - 2010
- Winner: Evening Standard Award, The Scottsboro Boys, Garrick Theatre - 2014
- Olivier Nominee: The Scottsboro Boys, London, Young Vic - 2013
- Olivier Nominee: People, Places and Things, West End - 2016
- Olivier Nominee: Dreamgirls, West End - 2017
- Olivier Nominee: Show Boat - West End - 2017

== Additional credits ==
- Producer: The Sign in Sidney Brustein's Window, Broadway, opened April 2023
- Producer: Life of Pi, Broadway, opened April 2023
- Producer: Peter Pan Goes Wrong, Broadway, opened April 2023
- Producer: Death of a Salesman, Broadway, opened October 2022
- Producer: Company, Broadway, opened December 2021
- Producer: The Lehman Trilogy, Broadway, opened December 2021
- Producer: A Christmas Carol, Broadway, opened November 2019
- Producer: The Inheritance, Broadway, opened November 2019
- Producer: Network, Broadway, opened December 2018
- Producer: Pretty Woman: The Musical, Broadway, opened August 2018
- Producer: Angels in America: Millennium Approaches, Broadway, opened March 2018
- Producer: Dreamgirls, West End, opened December 2016
- Lead Producer: The Play That Goes Wrong Broadway - 2017
- Lead Producer: The Life, Southward Theatre London - 2017
- Lead Producer: Gabriel, The Tour London, UK - 2017
- Producer: Desperate Writers, Off Broadway - 2011
- Co-Writer: Desperate Writers, Off Broadway - 2011

=== Previous Broadway shows ===
- China Doll by David Mamet - 2016
- Anarchist by David Mamet - 2012
- Stick Fly - 2011

=== London shows ===
- The Lion, the Witch, and the Wardrobe, opened July 2022
- Show Boat, 2016 Nominee
- The King's Speech
- El Chico del Oz Peru. Winner 2013 PREMIO LUCES AWARD Best Musical (Peru)

=== Off Broadway ===
- Producer: The Effect, Barrow Street Theatre - 2016
- Producer: Desperate Writers, Off Broadway - 2011
- Co-Writer: Desperate Writers, Off Broadway - 2011

==== Television ====
- Actress ("Saleswoman"): The Dealership, Season 9, Episode 11 of Seinfeld, 1998
