= Rupert Gavin =

British businessman and theatre impresario

Sir Rupert Gavin
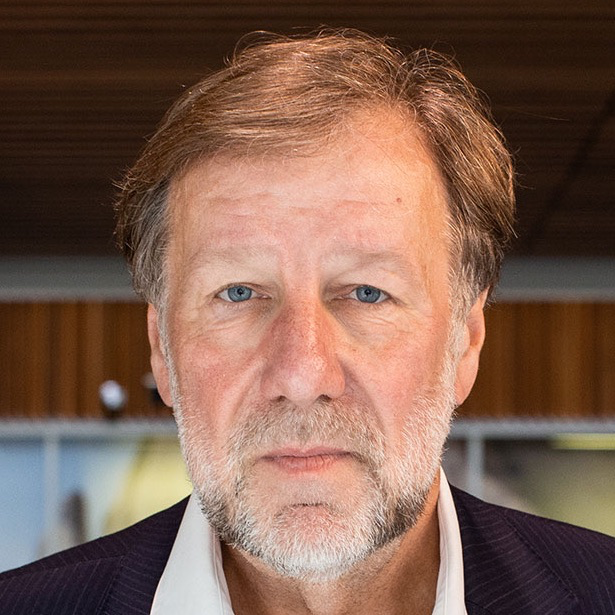
- Portrait of Rupert Gavin (2020)
- Born: 1 October 1954 (age 71); St Mary Abbots Hospital, London
- Occupations: Entrepreneur, businessman and impresario
- Known for: Management of creative companies; arts production

Sir Rupert Alexander Gavin (born 1 October 1954) is a British businessman and theatre impresario.

Gavin served as chairman of Historic Royal Palaces from 2015 to 2022 and as a member of the Honours Committee for Arts and Media from 2016 to 2022. He was chief executive officer of BBC Worldwide from 1998 to 2004 and of Odeon Cinemas from 2005 to 2014. As a producer and financier, he has produced or co-produced more than 300 plays and musicals through his company, Incidental Colman.

In 2025, Unicorn published Gavin's book Amorous or Loving? The Highly Peculiar Tale of English and the English, which examines the history and development of the English language.

== Current roles ==
In 2015 Gavin was appointed chairman of Historic Royal Palaces, the charity responsible for the management and conservation of the Tower of London, Kensington Palace, Hampton Court Palace, Banqueting House, Kew Palace, and Hillsborough Castle. His tenure was extended for a second term in May 2018.

In 2024, Gavin was appointed the Chair of English National Ballet. In 2025, he was also appointed Women’s Prize for Playwriting charity's trustee. He also chair the Village Cinemas, Greece and the Living Room Cinema.

He is chairman of the theatre production company Incidental Colman, which has produced/co-produced in the West End and on Broadway and won seventeen Olivier Awards.

He is senior assistant in Court Court of the Worshipful Company of Grocers, and also Chairman of the HMG Honours Committee for Media and the Arts and commenced his second term as of January 2019. He is a Senior Assistant of the Court of the Worshipful Company of Grocers, having served as Master for 2017/18. He is serving as the Chairman of the Living Room Cinema, the new start-up cinema chain. Gavin is a director of the West End industry body, SOLT.

Gavin was knighted in the 2023 Birthday Honours for services to drama, the arts, heritage and the economy.

== Early career ==
Gavin was educated at Magdalene College at Cambridge University, where he had an exhibition in economics. After graduation, and a stint as a film script writer, he took a copywriting role at Sharps advertising agency where he would eventually become an equity partner before it was sold to Saatchi & Saatchi. While working at Sharps he established close links with Dixons Stores Group, and would eventually become deputy managing director of the electronics retailer. In 1994, he joined British Telecom to work on its internet and multimedia strategy; he became managing director of the firm's consumer division. In 1998, he became chief executive of BBC Worldwide. He was CEO of Odeon Cinemas and UCI Cinemas Group from 2006 to 2014

Gavin has also served as Board member and shareholder of Ambassador Theatre Group, Chairman of DNeg plc, Chairman of Contender Entertainment Group, Chairman of Screenstage, NED and audit Chair of Wyevale Garden Centres, NED of Countrywide plc and Virgin Mobile plc, Governor of the National Film and Television School and Treasurer of the Contemporary Art Society.

== Recent theatre productions, co-productions and financings ==
- Mojo
- The Ferryman
- The Book of Mormon
- Jersey Boys
- West Side Story (50th-anniversary revival)
- Brainiac
- Shockheaded Peter
- Othello with Lenny Henry
- A View from the Bridge with Ken Stott
- Ghosts with Lesley Manville
- Long Days Journey into Night with David Suchet
- All My Sons with David Suchet
- Death of a Salesman with Philip Seymour Hoffman and Andrew Garfield
- South Pacific
- Legally Blonde
- The Sunshine Boys with Danny DeVito
- Jerusalem with Mark Rylance
- Twelfth Night and Richard III with Mark Rylance
- Farinelli and the King with Mark Rylance
- Private Lives with Kim Cattrall
- Clybourne Park
- The Birthday Party with Toby Jones, Zoë Wanamaker and Stephen Mangan
- Old Times with Kristin Scott Thomas
- Betrayal with Kristin Scott Thomas
- Electra with Kristin Scott Thomas
- Three Sisters
- King Charles III with Tim Pigott-Smith
- 1984
- King Lear with Ian McKellen
- Hamlet with Benedict Cumberbatch
- Hamlet with Andrew Scott
- Gypsy with Imelda Staunton
- Sunny Afternoon
- The River with Hugh Jackman
- Dreamgirls
- The Jungle
- Consent
- Who's Afraid of Virginia Woolf? with Imelda Staunton
- Tina Turner – The Musical
- The Inheritance
- All About Eve with Gillian Anderson and Lily James
- The King and I
- Caroline, or Change with Sharon D. Clarke
- Uncle Vanya with Toby Jones
- Leopoldstadt by Sir Tom Stoppard
- Betrayal with Tom Hiddleston
- Cyrano de Bergerac with James McAvoy
- All of the dramatic works of Arthur Smith since 1980
- Pretty Woman (London)
- The Rocky Horror Show
- Anything Goes
- Cabaret, with Eddie Redmayne and Jessie Buckley
- Constellations
- Fiddler on the Roof
- The Years
- Oedipus (with Mark Strong and Lesley Manville)
- A Little Life
- Macbeth (with Ralph Fiennes)
- Cyrano de Bergerac (with Adrian Lester)
- The Importance of Being Earnest (with Stephen Fry)
- The Curious Case of Benjamin Button
- Hay Fever (with Richard E Grant and Christine Baranski)
- All My Sons (with Bryan Cranston)
- Who’s Afraid of Virginia Woolf (with Gillian Anderson and Billy Crudup)
- The Cherry Orchard (with Kristen Scott Thomas and Stephen Mangan)
- Tartuffe (with Mark Rylance)

In 2012 the Evening Standard newspaper dubbed Gavin "Mr West End" about London's Theatreland. Productions/co-productions by Incidental Colman have won thirty Olivier awards for either Best New Play, Best Play Revival, Best New Musical, Best Musical Revival or Best Entertainment.

== Personal life ==
Gavin married Ellen Miller in 1991; the couple has two daughters, Alexandra and Isabella, and live in London. Debrett's lists his leisure activities as "...theatre producer, lyricist and gardener". He is a Fellow of the Royal Television Society.

== Charitable activities ==
Gavin is Chair of the English National Ballet and a trustee of the Women’s Prize for Playwriting. He is also a trustee of the Theatre Development Trust.

Gavin has been involved with the Grocers’ Charity, which supports a range of small charities. He currently sits on the Education and Charities Committee of the Grocers' Company. He is a Patron of the Hay Literary Festival, the London Library, and the Purbeck International Chamber Music Festival. He sits on the Development Council of the Almeida Theatre.

=== Ancestry ===
He is of direct descent from James Gavin (b 1658), the Kirk Beadle of Lunan, Angus, and the family motto is By industry we prosper.
