= Richard Barr =

American theater director and producer

- Born: Richard Alphonse Baer; September 6, 1917; Washington, D.C.
- Died: January 9, 1989 (aged 71); New York City, N.Y.
- Occupation(s): Director, producer, actor

Richard David Barr (September 6, 1917 – January 9, 1989) was an American theater director and producer. He served as the president of the League of American Theatres and Producers from 1967 until his death.

== Biography ==
Richard David Barr was born Richard Alphonse Baer on September 6, 1917, in Washington, D.C., to parents David Alphonse Baer and Ruth Nanette Israel Baer. In 1938, he graduated from Princeton University, where he had acted in various plays. From 1941 through 1945, Barr served as a Second Lieutenant in the United States Army Air Forces in the World War II era. While in the Army Air Forces, he was stationed in California and worked in the First Motion Picture Unit. He died of AIDS-related liver failure at Mount Sinai Hospital on January 9, 1989, aged 71.

== Career ==
Richard Barr began his theatrical career as an actor in the Mercury Theatre, the independent repertory theatre company of Orson Welles. He made his first professional appearance in the Mercury production of Danton's Death in 1938. Later that year, he took part in the infamous radio broadcast of "The War of the Worlds". Barr remained with the Mercury company until he left for the war in 1941. He was the associate producer of Citizen Kane.

Barr changed his name from Baer after the war, to avoid confusion with another Richard Baer. Coincidentally, the two had served together in the same Air Force unit, and then were both employed by Warner Bros. in Hollywood. Barr took his father's first name as his middle name.

Barr became an accomplished director and producer. In 1961, he won his first Drama Desk Award. His 1962 original Broadway production of Who's Afraid of Virginia Woolf? earned him two Tony Awards: Best Play and Best Producer (dramatic). His 1979 original Broadway production of Sweeney Todd: The Demon Barber of Fleet Street earned him the Drama Desk Award for Outstanding Musical and the Tony Award for Best Musical.

In 1967 Barr was elected president of what was then known as the League of American Theatres and Producers, an office he would hold until his death in 1989. As president he shifted Broadway's curtain times from 8:30 p.m. to 7:30 p.m. in an effort to bring in more businessmen on weeknights. The experiment was considered a success, though curtain times were later shifted to 8 p.m, where they have remained to this day.
