= Kermit Bloomgarden =

American theatre producer

- Born: December 15, 1904; New York City, New York, U.S.
- Died: September 20, 1976 (aged 71); New York City, New York, U.S.
- Education: New York University
- Occupation: Theatre producer

Kermit Bloomgarden (December 15, 1904 – September 20, 1976) was an American theatrical producer. He was an accountant before he began producing plays on Broadway including Death of a Salesman (1949), The Diary of Anne Frank (1955), The Music Man (1957), Look Homeward, Angel (1957), and Equus (1973).

== Early life ==
Bloomgarden was born in Brooklyn to Zemad and Annie (née Groden) Bloomgarden, where he attended the local public schools. He majored in accounting at New York University and became a Certified Public Accountant after his graduation in 1926.

== Career ==
Bloomgarden transitioned into theater after meeting Arthur Beckhard at a 1932 dinner party, who convinced Bloomgarden, as he later recounted, that "the theater was for me". He worked for Beckhard as his general manager, before accepting the same position with Herman Shumlin. In his ten years with Shumlin, he helped produce a number of Lillian Hellman's plays, including The Children's Hour (1934), The Little Foxes (1939), and Watch on the Rhine (1942), and The Lark (1952), Hellman's English-language version of the play L'Alouette by Jean Anouilh. Bloomgarden also mounted Hellman's last play Toys in the Attic (1960).

His first producing effort was Heavenly Express (1940), starring John Garfield, which closed shortly after it opened. His first hit was Deep Are the Roots (1945), followed by Hellman's Another Part of the Forest (1946). Command Decision (1947) written by William Wister Haines, followed, with Paul Kelly sharing the Best Actor Tony Award that year for his performance and James Whitmore earning the Tony for "Best Performance by a Newcomer". Bloomgarden had a major string of success that culminated with the February 1949 opening of Arthur Miller's Death of a Salesman, which earned a Tony Award, Drama Desk Award and the Pulitzer Prize.

The winning streak ended with Lillian Hellman's works Montserrat (1949) and The Autumn Garden (1950), but he got back on track with a revival of Hellman's The Children's Hour soon thereafter. Bloomgarden produced Arthur Miller's modestly successful A View From the Bridge and The Diary of Anne Frank, both in 1955, followed by The Most Happy Fella (1956), starring Robert Weede, and The Music Man in 1957.

In November 1957, Bloomgarden opened Look Homeward, Angel, based on the novel by Thomas Wolfe. Ketti Frings, better known for her screenplays, wrote the play, and George Roy Hill, who had worked mostly in television, directed. The show made Anthony Perkins a star.

== Later career and death ==
Arteriosclerosis forced the amputation of his right leg in 1971. Producer Scott Rudin worked for Bloomgarden; Rudin relates on NPR's Fresh Air (June 6, 2016), how he once carried the artificial leg for repair on NY public transport calling it one of the most memorable days in his life. After a lengthy recuperation, Kermit triumphantly returned to producing with the off-Broadway transfer of the Circle Repertory Company production of Lanford Wilson's The Hot l Baltimore, which ran for 1,166 performances and won the New York Drama Critics Circle Award for Best American Play. Afterwards, he brought Peter Shaffer's Equus to the stage in 1974, which he had co-produced with Doris Abrahams.

Bloomgarden died at age 71 in his New York City home on September 20, 1976, having dealt with a brain tumor for six months before his death. In 1983, Bloomgarden was posthumously inducted into the American Theater Hall of Fame.

== Personal life ==
Bloomgarden's first wife, Hattie Richardson, who sang under the name Linda Lee, died in 1942. His marriage to his second wife, Virginia Kaye, ended in divorce. He had two sons with Kaye.
