= John Glines =

American playwright and theater producer

John Glines (October 11, 1933 – August 8, 2018) was an American playwright and theater producer. He won a Tony Award and multiple Drama Desk Awards during his producing career.

== Playwright and producer ==
Born in Santa Maria, California, Glines graduated from Yale in 1955 with a BA in drama. As a writer in children’s television, he worked for seven years on Captain Kangaroo and for four years on Sesame Street. His play In The Desert Of My Soul was anthologized in Best Short Plays Of 1976. His musical Gulp!, written with Stephen Greco and Robin Jones, had a lengthy off-off-Broadway run in 1977.

His plays written for, and originally produced by The Glines, the non-profit organization for gay arts which he co-founded in 1976 with Barry Laine and Jerry Tobin, include On Tina Tuna Walk, In Her Own Words (A Biography of Jane Chambers), Men Of Manhattan (also made into a film directed by Anthony Marsellis), Chicken Delight, Body And Soul Murder In Disguise, Key West, and Heavenly Days. His last play, Butterflies And Tigers, based on stories of the Chinese people during the Cultural Revolution, had an extended run in New York City in 1998. The Glines produced many works by lesbian and gay male playwrights, including Jane Chambers, Robert Patrick, Doric Wilson, and Harvey Fierstein. Over the years many recognizable actors and prestigious writers (across all gender identities and sexual identities) have worked with The Glines, including Matthew Broderick, Jean Smart, Charles Busch, Allen Ginsberg, Lou Liberatore, Jonathan Hadary, Armistead Maupin, Pat Bond, Felice Picano, Ned Rorem, Vito Russo, Robin Tyler, Audre Lorde, Edmund White, Dan Lauria, James Purdy, John Rechy, Fisher Stevens, and Jack Wrangler.

In 1985 he told Playbill, “Nine years ago, [gay] playwrights and actors didn’t use their own names; a gay play meant something pornographic. I thought by using my own name, it would be a forerunner — it would force others to do the same.”

Glines won a Tony Award and a Drama Desk Award in 1983 as producer of Torch Song Trilogy. When Torch Song Trilogy won Best Play just two years after public health recognition of the AIDS crisis, Glines said on the national telecast, "This is a stupendous and miraculous moment, and I would like to accept this in memory of Jane Chambers and Billy Blackwell and in honor of all my brothers and sisters." After thanking Fierstein and others in the company, Glines concluded, "And lastly but most importantly to the one person who believed and followed the dream from the very beginning who never said, 'You’re crazy and it can’t be done,' I refer to my partner and my lover, Lawrence Lane." He was the first person to acknowledge his same-sex lover on a major awards show. Writing in 2017 in The New York Times, Stuart Emmrich said he and his partner, Barry, "were shocked. It was the first time either of us had seen a real-life gay man openly acknowledge a romantic relationship on network TV, much less on an awards program." The Times did not cover Glines' historic speech in its next day coverage, but did quote Natalia Makarova who won for Best Actress in a Musical for On Your Toes thanking her husband "who didn’t help much but wasn’t in the way." And the newspaper noted that Tommy Tune, who won two Tonys for On Your Toes, wore "a bright pink shirt and pink bow tie" and thanked his sister.

Glines won the Drama Desk Award and a Tony nomination in 1985 as producer of As Is, and won the Drama Desk Award in 1994 for Whoop-Dee-Doo!

Philip Crosby, managing director of the Richmond Triangle Players, an LGBTQ theater group now in its 25th year in Virginia, wrote, “He enabled all the LGBTQ theaters across the country to have the courage to produce the works we do.”

In 2022, John Glines was included in the book 50 Key Figures in Queer US Theatre, profiled in a chapter written by theatre scholar Jordan Schildcrout.

== Activism ==
In 1987, John founded Stamp Out AIDS to raise a million dollars to fight the HIV and AIDS epidemic by selling stamps that people could use like Easter Seals. He enlisted the participation of Helen Hayes, Pearl Bailey, Vivian Blaine, Ellen Greene, Richard Dreyfuss, and Estelle Getty. In 1992, Glines was a founding board member of Broadway Cares/ Equity Fights AIDS, whose longtime executive director, Tom Viola, wrote on Facebook, “John will always be a part of our legacy.”

Concurrently with his theatre work, Glines was a founding trustee of Broadway Cares/Equity Fights AIDS, which grew out of Stamp Out AIDS, the non-profit organization he founded in 1985 as a result of his work on As Is.

Glines was honored by numerous organizations, including the Empire State Pride Agenda (Artistic Vision Award), Parents, Families, and Friends of Lesbians and Gays (PFLAG) (Oscar Wilde Award), the Allied Gay and Lesbian Association of Los Angeles, and Off-Off-Broadway Review (Lifetime Achievement Award).

== Personal life ==
Glines married Chaowarat Chiewvej in 2014.

Glines died from complications from surgery and emphysema at the age of 84 on August 8, 2018 at his home in Bangkok, Thailand.
