= Nelle Nugent =

American independent Broadway producer (born 1939)

Nelle Nugent (born 1939) is an American independent Broadway producer who has won several Tony Awards.

== Biography ==
She was born May 24, 1939, in Jersey City and in 1960 graduated from Skidmore College. Nugent has overseen productions such as Amadeus, Morning's at Seven, The Elephant Man, The Life and Adventures of Nicholas Nickleby, and Dracula, and awards she has won includes Tony for all five listed shows.

In 1982 she began her third marriage, to Jolyon Fox Stern, president of a New York insurance brokerage.

She and producer John Schwally started the east coast chapter of the Producers Guild of America in 2001, and as of 2010 she is one of its five members-at-large.

In 2011 she was a co-producer with musician Alicia Keys and Reuben Cannon for Lydia Diamond's Stick Fly at the Cort Theatre on Broadway, beginning November 18, 2011.
