= Pat Bond =

American actress (1925–1990)

- Born: February 27, 1925; Chicago, Illinois, U.S.
- Died: December 24, 1990 (aged 65); Marin County, California, U.S.
- Education: San Francisco State College (BA, MA)
- Occupation: Actress

Pat Bond (February 27, 1925 – December 24, 1990) was an American actress who starred on stage, television and movies. She was openly lesbian and in many cases she was the first gay woman people saw on stage. Her career spanned some 40 years.

== Early life ==
Born Patricia Childers, she spent her childhood in Chicago. She and her family moved to Davenport, Iowa, when she was a teenager. While there she attended a Catholic women's college. She later equated this experience to "a finishing school where they finished me". She joined the Women's Army Corps in 1945. Having accepted her homosexuality by this point, she was interested in meeting other lesbians. She acted as a nurse for soldiers returning from the South Pacific and served in occupied Japan.

She earned a BA and MA in theater from San Francisco State College.

== Career ==
Following her discharge from the Army, she moved to San Francisco and became involved in the gay culture there. She also began acting on stage and performed in many plays, but did not become nationally known until footage from an interview with her appeared in a landmark documentary about gay people, titled Word Is Out (1977). Her performance in this film, in which she spoke comically and nostalgically about her experiences in the Army, launched her career as an actress and storyteller. By the late 1970s/80s, she was performing four one woman shows in theaters around the country.

Gerty Gerty Gerty Stein Is Back Back Back was her most popular performance. She played the legendary Gertrude Stein and recounted humorous stories of Gertrude's life in Paris with her companion Alice B. Toklas. The show was a huge success and was televised repeatedly on PBS stations across the country. Her other well-known stage shows were Conversations with Pat Bond, centering mainly on reminiscences of her youth; Murder in the WAC, focusing on the Army's lesbian purge in the late 1940; and Lorena Hickock and Eleanor Roosevelt: A Love Story.

Pat's career continued to flourish throughout the 1980s. Her one-woman shows often were sold-out events, and she became famous for her incredible comic timing. Film roles in Anti-Clock and the film version of the novel The House of God garnered her several good reviews, increasing her visibility and popularity. She was on the board of directors of Theater Rhinoceros in San Francisco and directed a number of plays there.

== Personal life ==
In 1947, in Tokyo, 500 women were dishonorably discharged from the Army on the charge of homosexuality. During this period, many lesbians testified against each other in trial but Bond married a gay GI soldier to avoid prosecution. Her marriage to Paul Bond in San Francisco afforded Bond an honorable discharge from the Army on July 3, 1947. She later said she regretted leaving her lover in the Corps, but did so to protect her lover. Bond knew that if she stayed, her lover would be more likely to be testified against.

In 1990, Pat was honored by the San Francisco Board of Supervisors in recognition of her Army tenure at the end of World War II. She died of emphysema on Christmas Eve 1990 in Marin County, California, aged 65. Her personal papers and photo albums were donated to the Gay and Lesbian Historical Society. In 1992, The Pat Bond Memorial Old Dyke Award was founded in her honor. The award recognizes Bay Area lesbians over 60 who have made outstanding contributions to the world.
