= Saint Subber =

American theatre producer (1918–1994)

Arnold Saint-Subber (February 18, 1918 – April 19, 1994), usually known as Saint Subber, was an American theatrical producer.

== Early life ==
Subber grew up in New York City, where both of his parents were theatre ticket brokers. He attended New York University. He was an assistant stage manager for the revue Hellzapoppin' starring Olsen and Johnson and assistant to producer John Murray Anderson for Billy Rose's Aquacade at the 1939 New York World's Fair.

== Producing career ==
Subber won a Tony Award as producer of the musical Kiss Me, Kate, which ran on Broadway from 1948 to 1951. Subber has often been described as conceiving of the show while working as a stagehand on a production of The Taming of the Shrew starring the real-life husband and wife Alfred Lunt and Lynn Fontanne and noticing that the couple "quarreled almost as much off stage as they did in the play". (However, a representative of the estate of Samuel and Bella Spewack, who wrote the musical's book, has stated that the backstage conflict plot came purely from the Spewacks' imagination and was not inspired by Lunt and Fontanne's relationship.) However, Subber maintained that his role as the stage manager for Lunt and Fontaine inspired the idea, and he wrote the original book at the insistence of his lifelong friend, Montgomery Clift, who locked him in a hotel room until the work was completed. Book in hand, Clift then introduced Subber to Cole Porter who wrote the music for "Kiss Me Kate" in 10 days.

Subber also received Tony nominations for Best Play as producer of both William Inge's The Dark at the Top of the Stairs and Paddy Chayefsky's The Tenth Man, each of which also ran for more than a year on Broadway. He eventually became associated with Neil Simon and produced seven of his plays on Broadway: Barefoot in the Park, The Odd Couple, The Star-Spangled Girl, Plaza Suite, Last of the Red Hot Lovers, The Gingerbread Lady, and The Prisoner of Second Avenue. Of these seven plays, five resulted in Tony nominations for Subber as producer of a Best Play nominee (Barefoot in the Park, The Odd Couple, Plaza Suite, Last of the Red Hot Lovers, and The Prisoner of Second Avenue), and Barefoot in the Park also earned Subber a nomination as Best Producer (Dramatic).

After Subber's run of Neil Simon plays ended, he produced two more musicals on Broadway: Gigi by Alan Jay Lerner and Frederick Loewe in 1973, and 1600 Pennsylvania Avenue by Lerner and Leonard Bernstein in 1976. Regarding the latter show, Subber said in a 1980 interview, "I loathed it. It wasn't working out well. I tried desperately to get everyone to abandon it. After many fights, I left the production." Subber moved to Mendocino, California. His next return to New York was to sign contracts for his last production, Patrick Meyers' play K2, which was originally scheduled to run on Broadway in 1981 but finally arrived on Broadway in 1983.

Subber died in 1994 of heart failure at his home “The John Howard Galen House”, a Berkeley landmark, built in 1912, LeRoy Avenue, Berkeley, California.

== Name ==
The producer's name was variously punctuated as "Saint-Subber" and "Saint Subber", with and without a hyphen. He was known to those who called him by name as "Saint".
