= Tony Award for Best Revival of a Play =

American theatre award for Broadway

- Awarded for: Best Revival of a Play
- Location: New York City
- Presented by: American Theatre Wing The Broadway League
- Currently held by: Death of a Salesman by Arthur Miller (2026)
- Website: TonyAwards.com

The Tony Award for Best Revival of a Play has only been awarded since 1994. Prior to that, plays and musicals were considered together for the Tony Award for Best Revival. The award is given to the best non-musical play that has appeared on Broadway in a previous production, or which is determined to be a "classic" or in the historical or popular repertoire despite not having been produced on Broadway. The award goes to the producers of the play. In addition, as of 2026, authors (if living) are also eligible for the award for shows that are considered revivals but that have not previously appeared on Broadway.

== Winners and nominees ==
indicates the winner

=== 1970s ===
Year	Production	Nominees
Best Revival
1977 (31st)
1977 (31st)	Porgy and Bess	Sherwin M. Goldman and Houston Grand Opera
1977 (31st)	The Cherry Orchard	Joseph Papp
1977 (31st)	Guys and Dolls	Moe Septee in association with Victor H. Potamkin, Carmen F. Zollo and Ashton Springer
1977 (31st)	The Threepenny Opera	Joseph Papp
1978 (32nd)
1978 (32nd)	Dracula	Jujamcyn Theaters, Elizabeth Ireland McCann, John Wulp, Victor Lurie, Nelle Nugent and Max Weitzenhoffer
1978 (32nd)	Tartuffe	Circle in the Square
1978 (32nd)	Timbuktu!	Luther Davis
1978 (32nd)	A Touch of the Poet	Elliot Martin

=== 1980s ===
Year	Production	Nominees
1980 (34th)
1980 (34th)	Morning's at Seven	Elizabeth Ireland McCann, Nelle Nugent and Ray Larson
1980 (34th)	Major Barbara	Circle in the Square
1980 (34th)	Peter Pan	Zev Buffman
1980 (34th)	West Side Story	Gladys Rackmil, John F. Kennedy Center for the Performing Arts, James M. Nederlander and Ruth Mitchell
1981 (35th)
1981 (35th)	The Pirates of Penzance	Joseph Papp and New York Shakespeare Festival
1981 (35th)	Brigadoon	Zev Bufman and The Shubert Organization
1981 (35th)	Camelot	Mike Merrick and Don Gregory
1981 (35th)	The Little Foxes	Zev Bufman, Donald C. Carter and Jon Cultler
1982 (36th)
1982 (36th)	Othello	Barry and Fran Weissler and CBS Video Enterprises
1982 (36th)	Medea	Barry and Fran Weissler, John F. Kennedy Center for the Performing Arts and Bunny and Warren Austin
1982 (36th)	My Fair Lady	Mike Merrick and Don Gregory
1982 (36th)	A Taste of Honey	Roundabout Theatre Company, Gene Feist and Michael Fried
1983 (37th)
1983 (37th)	On Your Toes	Alfred de Liagre Jr., Roger L. Stevens, John Mauceri, Donald R. Seawell and Andre Pastoria
1983 (37th)	All's Well That Ends Well	Royal Shakespeare Company
1983 (37th)	The Caine Mutiny Court-Martial	Circle in the Square Theatre and John F. Kennedy Center for the Performing Arts
1983 (37th)	A View from the Bridge	Zev Buffman and Sidney Schlenker
1984 (38th)
1984 (38th)	Death of a Salesman	Robert Whitehead and Roger L. Stevens
1984 (38th)	American Buffalo	Elliot Martin and Arnold Bernhard
1984 (38th)	Heartbreak House	Circle in the Square
1984 (38th)	A Moon for the Misbegotten	The Shubert Organization and Emanuel Azenberg
1985 (39th)
1985 (39th)	Joe Egg	The Shubert Organization, Emanuel Azenberg, Roger Berlind, Ivan Bloch and MTM Enterprises Inc.
1985 (39th)	Cyrano de Bergerac	James M. Nederlander, Elizabeth Ireland McCann, Nelle Nugent, Cynthia Wood, Dale Duffy and Allan Carr
1985 (39th)	Much Ado About Nothing	James M. Nederlander, Elizabeth Ireland McCann, Nelle Nugent, Cynthia Wood, Dale Duffy and Allan Carr
1985 (39th)	Strange Interlude	Robert Michael Geisler, John Roberdeau, Douglas Urbanski, James M. Nederlander, Duncan Weldon, Paul Gregg, Lionel Becker and Jerome Minskoff
1986 (40th)
1986 (40th)	Sweet Charity	Jerome Minskoff, James M. Nederlander, Arthur Rubin and Joseph Harris
1986 (40th)	Hay Fever	Roger Peters and MBS Co.
1986 (40th)	The Iceman Cometh	Lewis Allen, James M. Nederlander, Stephen Graham and Ben Edwards
1986 (40th)	Loot	David Merrick Arts Foundation, Charles P. Kopelman and Mark Simon
1987 (41st)
1987 (41st)	All My Sons	Jay H. Fuchs, Steven Warnick and Charles Patsos
1987 (41st)	The Front Page	Lincoln Center Theater, Gregory Mosher and Bernard Gersten
1987 (41st)	The Life and Adventures of Nicholas Nickleby	The Shubert Organization, Three Knights, Ltd. and Robert Fox Ltd.
1987 (41st)	Pygmalion	The Shubert Organization, Jerome Minskoff and Duncan Weldon
1988 (42nd)
1988 (42nd)	Anything Goes	Lincoln Center Theater, Gregory Mosher and Bernard Gersten
1988 (42nd)	Cabaret	Barry and Fran Weissler
1988 (42nd)	Dreamgirls	Marvin A. Krauss and Irving Siders
1988 (42nd)	A Streetcar Named Desire	Circle in the Square, Theodore Mann and Paul Libin
1989 (43rd)
1989 (43rd)	Our Town	Lincoln Center Theater, Gregory Mosher and Bernard Gersten
1989 (43rd)	Ah, Wilderness!	Ken Marsolis, Alexander H. Cohen, John F. Kennedy Center for the Performing Arts, Yale Repertory Theatre, Richard Norton, Irma Oestreicher, and Elizabeth D. White
1989 (43rd)	Ain't Misbehavin'	The Shubert Organization, Emanuel Azenberg, Dasha Epstein and Roger Berlind
1989 (43rd)	Cafe Crown	LeFrak Entertainment, James M. Nederlander, Francine LeFrak, James L. Nederlander and Arthur Rubin

=== 1990s ===
Year	Production	Nominees
1990 (44th)
1990 (44th)	Gypsy	Barry and Fran Weissler, Kathy Levin and Barry Brown
1990 (44th)	The Circle	Elliot Martin, The Shubert Organization and Suntory International Corp.
1990 (44th)	The Merchant of Venice	Duncan Weldon, Jerome Minskoff, Punch Productions and Peter Hall
1990 (44th)	Sweeney Todd	Circle in the Square Theatre, Theodore Mann and Paul Libin
1991 (45th)
1991 (45th)	Fiddler on the Roof	Barry and Fran Weissler and Pace Theatrical Group
1991 (45th)	The Miser	Circle in the Square Theatre, Theodore Mann and Paul Libin
1991 (45th)	Peter Pan	James M. Nederlander, Arthur Rubin, Thomas P. McCoy, Keith Stava, PP Investments, Inc. and John. B. Platt
1992 (46th)
1992 (46th)	Guys and Dolls	Dodger Productions, Roger Berlind, Jujamcyn Theaters / TV Asahi, Kardana Productions and John F. Kennedy Center for the Performing Arts
1992 (46th)	The Most Happy Fella	Goodspeed Opera House, Center Theatre Group / Ahmanson Theatre, Lincoln Center Theater, The Shubert Organization and Japan Satellite Broadcasting / Stagevision
1992 (46th)	On Borrowed Time	Circle in the Square Theatre, Theodore Mann, Robert Buckley and Paul Libin
1992 (46th)	The Visit	Roundabout Theatre Company, Todd Haimes and Gene Feist
1993 (47th)
1993 (47th)	Anna Christie	Roundabout Theatre Company and Todd Haimes
1993 (47th)	Saint Joan	National Actors Theatre, Tony Randall and Duncan Weldon
1993 (47th)	The Price	Roundabout Theatre Company and Todd Haimes
1993 (47th)	Wilder, Wilder, Wilder	Circle in the Square Theatre, Theodore Mann, George Elmer, Paul Libin, Willow Cabin Theatre Company, Edward Berkeley, Adam Oliensis and Maria Radman
Best Revival of a Play
1994 (48th)
1994 (48th)	An Inspector Calls	Noel Pearson, The Shubert Organization, Capital Cities/ABC and Joseph Harris
1994 (48th)	Abe Lincoln in Illinois	Lincoln Center Theater, André Bishop and Bernard Gersten
1994 (48th)	Medea	Bill Kenwright
1994 (48th)	Timon of Athens	National Actors Theatre and Tony Randall
1995 (49th)
1995 (49th)	The Heiress	Lincoln Center Theater, André Bishop and Bernard Gersten
1995 (49th)	Hamlet	Dodger Productions, Roger Berlind, Endemol Theatre Productions, Inc., Jujamcyn Theaters, Kardana Productions, Inc., Scott Rudin and Almeida Theatre Company
1995 (49th)	The Molière Comedies	Roundabout Theatre Company and Todd Haimes
1995 (49th)	The Rose Tattoo	Circle in the Square Theatre, Theodore Mann, Josephine R. Abady and Robert Bennett
1996 (50th)
1996 (50th)	A Delicate Balance	Lincoln Center Theater, André Bishop and Bernard Gersten
1996 (50th)	A Midsummer Night's Dream	Terry Allen Kramer, James L. Nederlander, Carole Shorenstein Hays, John F. Kennedy Center for the Performing Arts, Elizabeth Ireland McCann and The Royal Shakespeare Company
1996 (50th)	An Ideal Husband	Bill Kenwright
1996 (50th)	Inherit the Wind	National Actors Theatre and Tony Randall
1997 (51st)
1997 (51st)	A Doll's House	Bill Kenwright and Thelma Holt
1997 (51st)	London Assurance	Roundabout Theatre Company, Todd Haimes and Ellen Richard
1997 (51st)	Present Laughter	David Richenthal, Anita Waxman and Jujamcyn Theaters
1997 (51st)	The Gin Game	National Actors Theatre and Tony Randall
1998 (52nd)
1998 (52nd)	A View from the Bridge	Roundabout Theatre Company, Todd Haimes, Ellen Richard, Roger Berlind, James M. Nederlander, Nathaniel Kramer, Elizabeth Ireland McCann, Roy Gabay and Old Ivy Productions
1998 (52nd)	Ah, Wilderness!	Lincoln Center Theater, André Bishop and Bernard Gersten
1998 (52nd)	The Chairs	Bill Kenwright, Carole Shorenstein Hays, Scott Rudin, Stuart Thompson and Théâtre de Complicité / Royal Court Theatre
1998 (52nd)	The Diary of Anne Frank	David Stone, Amy Nederlander-Case, Jon B. Platt, Jujamcyn Theaters, Hal Luftig, Harriet Newman Leve and James D. Stern
1999 (53rd)
1999 (53rd)	Death of a Salesman	David Richenthal, Jujamcyn Theaters, Allan S, Gordon, Fox Theatricals, Jerry Frankel and Goodman Theatre
1999 (53rd)	Electra	Eric Krebs, Randall L. Wreghitt, Anita Waxman, Elizabeth Williams, Lawrence Horowitz, McCarter Theatre / Donmar Warehouse and Duncan Weldon
1999 (53rd)	The Iceman Cometh	Allan S. Gordon, Bill Haber, Ira Pittelman, Élan McAllister, Trigger Street Productions and Emanuel Azenberg
1999 (53rd)	Twelfth Night	Lincoln Center Theater, André Bishop and Bernard Gersten

=== 2000s ===
Year	Play	Nominees
2000 (54th)
2000 (54th)	The Real Thing	Anita Waxman, Elizabeth Williams, Rob Kastner, Miramax Films and Donmar Warehouse
2000 (54th)	Amadeus	Kim Poster, PW Productions, Adam Epstein, SFX Theatrical Group, Center Theatre Group / Ahmanson Theatre, Back Row Productions and Old Ivy Productions
2000 (54th)	A Moon for the Misbegotten	Elliot Martin, Chase Mishkin, Max Cooper, Jujamcyn Theaters, Anita Waxman, Elizabeth Williams and Goodman Theatre
2000 (54th)	The Price	David Richenthal
2001 (55th)
2001 (55th)	One Flew Over the Cuckoo's Nest	Michael Leavitt, Fox Theatricals, Anita Waxman, Elizabeth Williams, John York Noble, Randall L. Wreghitt, Dori Berinstein and Steppenwolf Theatre Company
2001 (55th)	The Best Man	Jeffrey Richards / Michael B. Rothfeld, Raymond J. Greenwald, Jerry Frankel and Darren Bagert
2001 (55th)	Betrayal	Roundabout Theatre Company, Todd Haimes, Ellen Richard and Julia C. Levy
2001 (55th)	The Search for Signs of Intelligent Life in the Universe	Tomlin and Wagner Theatricalz
2002 (56th)
2002 (56th)	Private Lives	Emanuel Azenberg, Ira Pittelman, Scott Nederlander, Frederick Zollo, Nicholas Paleologos, Broccoli/Sine, James Nederlander, Kevin McCollum, Jeffrey Seller, Duncan Weldon and Paul Elliott for Triumph Entertainment Partners Ltd.
2002 (56th)	The Crucible	David Richenthal, Manocherian/Leve/Boyett, Max Cooper, Allan S. Gordon, Roy Furman, Us Productions, É‰lan V. McAllister, Adam Epstein, Margo Lion, Dede Harris/Morton Swinsky, Clear Channel Entertainment, Old Ivy Productions, Jujamcyn Theaters, Jeffrey Ash, Berinstein/Selig, Golden/Skipper, Gene Korf, Robert Cole and Roundabout Theatre Company
2002 (56th)	Morning's at Seven	Lincoln Center Theater, André Bishop and Bernard Gersten
2002 (56th)	Noises Off	Ambassador Theatre Group and Act Productions, Waxman Williams Entertainment, D. Harris/M. Swinsky, USA Ostar Theatricals and Nederlander Presentations Inc. and Royal National Theatre
2003 (57th)
2003 (57th)	Long Day's Journey into Night	David Richenthal, Max Cooper, Eric Falkenstein, Anthony and Charlene Marshall, Darren Bagert, Kara Medoff, Lisa Vioni and Gene Korf
2003 (57th)	A Day in the Death of Joe Egg	Roundabout Theatre Company, Todd Haimes, Ellen Richard, Julia C. Levy and Sonia Friedman Productions
2003 (57th)	Dinner at Eight	Lincoln Center Theater, André Bishop and Bernard Gersten
2003 (57th)	Frankie and Johnny in the Clair de Lune	The Araca Group, Jean Doumanian Productions, USA Ostar Theatricals, Jam Theatricals, Ray and Kit Sawyer
2004 (58th)
2004 (58th)	Henry IV	Lincoln Center Theater, André Bishop and Bernard Gersten
2004 (58th)	Jumpers	Boyett Ostar Productions, Nederlander Presentations Inc., Freddy DeMann, Jean Doumanian, Stephanie McClelland, Arielle Tepper and National Theatre
2004 (58th)	King Lear	Lincoln Center Theater, André Bishop, Bernard Gersten and Stratford Festival of Canada
2004 (58th)	A Raisin in the Sun	David Binder, Vivek J. Tiwary, Susan Batson, Carl Rumbaugh, Ruth Hendel, Arielle Tepper, Jayne Baron Sherman, Dede Harris, Barbara Whitman and Cynthia Stroum
2005 (59th)
2005 (59th)	Glengarry Glen Ross	Jeffrey Richards, Jerry Frankel, Jam Theatricals, Boyett Ostar Productions, Ronald Frankel, Philip Lacerte, Stephanie P. McClelland / CJM Productions, Barry Weisbord, Zendog Productions, Herbert Goldsmith Productions, Roundabout Theatre Company, Todd Haimes, Ellen Richard and Julia C. Levy
2005 (59th)	On Golden Pond	Jeffrey Finn, Arlene Scanlan and Stuart Thompson
2005 (59th)	Twelve Angry Men	Roundabout Theatre Company, Todd Haimes, Ellen Richard and Julia C. Levy
2005 (59th)	Who's Afraid of Virginia Woolf?	Elizabeth Ireland McCann, Daryl Roth, Terry Allen Kramer, Scott Rudin, Roger Berlind, James L. Nederlander, Nick Simunek and Joey Parnes
2006 (60th)
2006 (60th)	Awake and Sing!	Lincoln Center Theater, André Bishop and Bernard Gersten
2006 (60th)	The Constant Wife	Roundabout Theatre Company, Todd Haimes, Ellen Richard and Julia C. Levy
2006 (60th)	Faith Healer	Michael Colgan and Sonia Friedman Productions, The Shubert Organization, Robert Bartner, Roger Berlind, Scott Rudin, Spring Sirkin and Gate Theatre Dublin
2006 (60th)	Seascape	Lincoln Center Theater, André Bishop and Bernard Gersten
2007 (61st)
2007 (61st)	Journey's End	Boyett Ostar Productions, Stephanie P. McClelland, Bill Rollnick, James D'Orta and Philip Geier
2007 (61st)	Inherit the Wind	Boyett Ostar Productions, The Shubert Organization, Lawrence Horowitz, Jon Avnet/Ralph Guild, Roy Furman, Debra Black / Daryl Roth, Bill Rollnick / Nancy Ellison Rollnick and Stephanie P. McClelland
2007 (61st)	Talk Radio	Jeffrey Richards, Jerry Frankel, Jam Theatricals, Francis Finlay, Ronald Frankel, James Fuld, Jr., Steve Green, Judith Hansen, Patty Ann Lacerte, James Riley, Mary Lu Roffe / Mort Swinsky, Sheldon Stein, Terri and Timothy Childs / Stylefour Productions and Irving Welzer / Herb Blodgett
2007 (61st)	Translations	Manhattan Theatre Club, McCarter Theatre Center, Lynne Meadow, Barry Grove, Emily Mann and Jeffrey Woodward
2008 (62nd)
2008 (62nd)	Boeing-Boeing	Sonia Friedman Productions, Bob Boyett, Act Productions, Matthew Byam Shaw, Robert G. Bartner, The Weinstein Company, Susan Gallin/Mary Lu Roffe, Broadway Across America, Tulchin/Jenkins/DSM and The Araca Group
2008 (62nd)	The Homecoming	Jeffrey Richards, Jerry Frankel, Jam Theatricals, Ergo Entertainment, Barbara & Buddy Freitag, Michael Gardner, Herbert Goldsmith Productions, Terry E. Schnuck, Harold Thau, Michael Filerman/Lynne Peyser, Ronald Frankel/David Jaroslawicz and Love Bunny Entertainment
2008 (62nd)	Les Liaisons Dangereuses	Roundabout Theatre Company, Todd Haimes, Harold Wolpert and Julia C. Levy
2008 (62nd)	Macbeth	Duncan Weldon and Paul Elliott, Jeffrey Archer, Bill Ballard, Terri & Timothy Childs, Rodger Hess, David Mirvish, Adriana Mnuchin, Emanuel Azenberg, BAM and The Chichester Festival Theatre
2009 (63rd)
2009 (63rd)	The Norman Conquests	Sonia Friedman Productions, Steven Baruch, Marc Routh, Richard Frankel, Tom Viertel, Dede Harris, Tulchin/Bartner/Lauren Doll, Jamie deRoy, Eric Falkenstein, Harriet Newman Leve, Probo Productions, Douglas G. Smith, Michael Filerman / Jennifer Manocherian, Richard Winkler, Dan Frishwasser, Pam Laudenslager / Remmel T. Dickinson, Jane Dubin / True Love Productions, Barbara Manocherian / Jennifer Isaacson and The Old Vic Theatre Company
2009 (63rd)	Joe Turner's Come and Gone	Lincoln Center Theater, André Bishop and Bernard Gersten
2009 (63rd)	Mary Stuart	Peter Oswald (new version by); Arielle Tepper Madover, Debra Black, Neal Street Productions / Matthew Byam Shaw, Scott Delman, Barbara Whitman, Jean Doumanian / Ruth Hendel, David Binder / CarlWend Productions / Spring Sirkin, Daryl Roth / James L. Nederlander / Chase Mishkin and Donmar Warehouse
2009 (63rd)	Waiting for Godot	Roundabout Theatre Company, Todd Haimes, Harold Wolpert, Julia C. Levy and Elizabeth Ireland McCann

=== 2010s ===
Year	Play	Nominees
2010 (64th)
2010 (64th)	Fences	Carole Shorenstein Hays and Scott Rudin
2010 (64th)	Lend Me a Tenor	The Araca Group, Stuart Thompson, Carl Moellenberg, Rodney Rigby, Olympus Theatricals, Broadway Across America, The Shubert Organization, Wendy Federman / Jamie deRoy / Richard Winkler, Lisa Cartwright, Spring Sirkin, Scott and Brian Zeilinger
2010 (64th)	The Royal Family	Manhattan Theatre Club, Lynne Meadow and Barry Grove
2010 (64th)	A View from the Bridge	Stuart Thompson, The Araca Group, Jeffrey Finn, Broadway Across America, Olympus Theatricals, Marisa Sechrest, The Weinstein Company, Jon B. Platt, Sonia Friedman Productions / Robert G. Bartner, Mort Swinsky / Joseph Deitch, Adam Zotovich / Ruth Hendel / Orin Wolf, Shelter Island Enterprises and The Shubert Organization
2011 (65th)
2011 (65th)	The Normal Heart	Daryl Roth, Paul Boskind, Martian Entertainment, Gregory Rae and Jayne Baron Sherman / Alexander Fraser
2011 (65th)	Arcadia	Sonia Friedman Productions, Roger Berlind, Stephanie P. McClelland, Scott M. Delman, Nicholas Quinn Rosenkranz, Disney Theatrical Group, Robert G. Bartner, Olympus Theatricals, Douglas Smith and Janine Safer Whitney
2011 (65th)	The Importance of Being Earnest	Roundabout Theatre Company, Todd Haimes, Harold Wolpert and Julia C. Levy
2011 (65th)	The Merchant of Venice	The Public Theater, Oskar Eustis, Andrew D. Hamingson, Jeffrey Richards, Jerry Frankel, Debbie Bisno and Eva Price, Amy Nederlander, Jonathan First, Stewart F. Lane and Bonnie Comley, Universal Pictures Stage Productions, Merritt Forrest Baer, The Araca Group, Broadway Across America, Joseph and Matthew Deitch, JK Productions, Terry Allen Kramer, Cathy Chernoff/Jay & Cindy Gutterman, Mallory Factor / Cheryl Lachowicz, Joey Parnes and The Shubert Organization
2012 (66th)
2012 (66th)	Death of a Salesman	Scott Rudin, Stuart Thompson, Jon B. Platt, Columbia Pictures, Jean Doumanian, Merritt Forrest Baer, Roger Berlind, Scott M. Delman, Sonia Friedman Productions, Ruth Hendel, Carl Moellenberg, Scott and Brian Zeilinger and Eli Bush
2012 (66th)	The Best Man	Jeffrey Richards, Jerry Frankel, INFINITY Stages, Universal Pictures Stage Productions, Barbara Manocherian / Michael Palitz, Kathleen K. Johnson, Andy Sandberg, Ken Mahoney / The Broadway Consortium, Fifty Church Street Productions, Larry Hirschhorn / Bennu Productions, Patty Baker, Paul Boskind and Martian Entertainment, Wendy Federman, Mark S. Golub and David S. Golub, Cricket Hooper Jiranek, Stewart F. Lane and Bonnie Comley, Carl Moellenberg, Harold Thau and Will Trice
2012 (66th)	Master Class	Manhattan Theatre Club, Lynne Meadow, Barry Grove, Max Cooper, Maberry Theatricals, Marks-Moore-Turnbull Group and Ted Snowdon
2012 (66th)	Wit	Manhattan Theatre Club, Lynne Meadow and Barry Grove
2013 (67th)
2013 (67th)	Who's Afraid of Virginia Woolf?	Jeffrey Richards, Jerry Frankel, Susan Quint Gallin, Mary Lu Roffe, Kit Seidel, Amy Danis & Mark Johannes, Patty Baker, Mark S. Golub and David S. Golub, Richard Gross, Jam Theatricals, Cheryl Lachowicz, Michael Palitz, Dramatic Forces/Angelina Fiordellisi, Luigi & Rose Caiola, Ken Greiner, Kathleen K. Johnson, Kirmser Ponturo Fund, Will Trice, GFour Productions and Steppenwolf Theatre Company
2013 (67th)	Golden Boy	Lincoln Center Theater, André Bishop and Bernard Gersten
2013 (67th)	Orphans	Frederick Zollo, Robert Cole, The Shubert Organization, Orin Wolf, Lucky VIII, Scott M. Delman, James P. MacGilvray and StylesFour Productions
2013 (67th)	The Trip to Bountiful	Nelle Nugent, Kevin Liles, Paula Marie Black, David R. Weinreb, Stephen C. Byrd, Alia M. Jones, Kenneth Teaton, Carole L. Haber / Philip Geier, Wendy Federman / Carl Moellenberg / Ricardo Hornos, Fifty Church Street Productions / Hallie Foote / Tyson and Kimberly Chandler, Joseph Sirola, Howard and Janet Kagan / Charles Salameno, Sharon A. Carr / Patricia R. Klausner, Raymond Gaspard / Andréa M. Price, Willette Murphy Klausner / Reginald M. Browne
2014 (68th)
2014 (68th)	A Raisin in the Sun	Scott Rudin, Roger Berlind, Eli Bush, Jon B. Platt, Scott M. Delman, Roy Furman, Stephanie P. McClelland, Ruth Hendel, Sonia Friedman / Tulchin Bartner, The Araca Group, Heni Koenigsberg, Daryl Roth, Joan Raffe and Jhett Tolentino, Joey Parnes, S.D. Wagner and John Johnson
2014 (68th)	The Cripple of Inishmaan	Michael Grandage Company, Arielle Tepper Madover, L.T.D. Productions, Stacey Mindich, Starry Night Entertainment, Scott M. Delman, Martin McCallum, Stephanie P. McClelland, Zeilinger Productions and The Shubert Organization
2014 (68th)	The Glass Menagerie	Jeffrey Richards, John N. Hart Jr., Jerry Frankel, Lou Spisto / Lucky VIII, INFINITY Stages, Scott M. Delman, Jam Theatricals, Mauro Taylor, Rebecca Gold, Michael Palitz, Charles E. Stone, Will Trice, GFour Productions and American Repertory Theater
2014 (68th)	Twelfth Night	Sonia Friedman Productions, Scott Landis, Roger Berlind, Glass Half Full Productions / Just for Laughs Theatricals, 1001 Nights Productions, Tulchin Bartner Productions, Jane Bergère, Paula Marie Black, Rupert Gavin, Stephanie P. McClelland, Shakespeare's Globe Centre USA, Max Cooper, Tanya Link Productions, Shakespeare Road and Shakespeare's Globe
2015 (69th)
2015 (69th)	Skylight	Robert Fox, Scott Rudin, Eli Bush, Roger Berlind, William Berlind, Roy Furman, Jon B. Platt, The Shubert Organization, Stephanie P. McClelland, Catherine Adler, Jay Alix and Una Jackman, Scott M. Delman, Heni Koenigsberg, Spring Sirkin, Stuart Thompson, True Love Productions, The Araca Group, Carlos Arana, David Mirvish, Joey Parnes, Sue Wagner and John Johnson
2015 (69th)	The Elephant Man	James L. Nederlander, Terry Allen Kramer, Catherine Adler, Roger Berlind, Caiola Productions, Patrick Catullo, Roy Furman, Larry Hirschhorn, Jeffrey Finn Productions, Van Kaplan, Edward M. Kaufmann, Hal Luftig, Arielle Tepper Madover, Peter May, Stephanie P. McClelland, The Shubert Organization, Douglas Smith, Jonathan Tisch, WLE MSG LLC, Scott and Brian Zeilinger and Williamstown Theatre Festival
2015 (69th)	This Is Our Youth	Scott Rudin, Eli Bush, Roger Berlind, William Berlind, Jon B. Platt, Roy Furman, The Shubert Organization, Ruth Hendel, Scott M. Delman, Stephanie P. McClelland, Sonia Friedman, Tulchin Bartner, The Araca Group, Heni Koenigsberg, Daryl Roth, Joan Raffe and Jhett Tolentino, Catherine & Fred Adler, Joey Parnes, Sue Wagner, John Johnson and Steppenwolf Theatre Company
2015 (69th)	You Can't Take It With You	Jeffrey Richards, Jerry Frankel, Jam Theatricals, Dominion Pictures, Gutterman & Winkler, Daryl Roth, Terry Schnuck, Jane Bergère, Caiola Productions, Rebecca Gold, Laruffa & Hinderliter, Larry Magid, Gabrielle Palitz, Spisto & Kierstead, SunnySpot Productions, Venuworks Theatricals, Jessica Genick, Will Trice, Roundabout Theatre Company, Todd Haimes, Harold Wolpert, Julia C. Levy and Sydney Beers
2016 (70th)
2016 (70th)	A View from the Bridge	Scott Rudin, Lincoln Center Theater, Eli Bush, Robert G. Bartner, Roger Berlind, William Berlind, Roy Furman, Peter May, Amanda Lipitz, Stephanie P. McClelland, Jay Alix and Una Jackman, Scott M. Delman, Sonia Friedman, John Gore, Ruth Hendel, JFL Theatricals, Heni Koenigsberg, Jon B. Platt, Daryl Roth, Spring Sirkin, Joey Parnes, Sue Wagner, John Johnson and The Young Vic
2016 (70th)	Blackbird	Scott Rudin, Eli Bush, Roger Berlind, William Berlind, Scott M. Delman, Peter May, Jon B. Platt, Len Blavatnik, Tulchin Bartner Productions, Jay Alix & Una Jackman, Heni Koenigsberg, Stacey Mindich, Wendy Federman, Joey Parnes, Sue Wagner and John Johnson
2016 (70th)	The Crucible	Scott Rudin, Eli Bush, Roger Berlind, William Berlind, Len Blavatnik, Roy Furman, Peter May, Jay Alix and Una Jackman, Scott M. Delman, Heni Koenigsberg, Daryl Roth, Jane Bergère, Sonia Friedman Productions, Ruth Hendel, JFL Theatricals, Stacey Mindich, Jon B. Platt, Megan Savage, Spring Sirkin, Tulchin Bartner Productions, Joey Parnes, Sue Wagner and John Johnson
2016 (70th)	Long Day's Journey Into Night	Roundabout Theatre Company, Todd Haimes, Harold Wolpert, Julia C. Levy, Sydney Beers and Ryan Murphy
2016 (70th)	Noises Off	Roundabout Theatre Company, Todd Haimes, Harold Wolpert, Julia C. Levy and Sydney Beers
2017 (71st)
2017 (71st)	Jitney	Manhattan Theatre Club, Lynne Meadow, Barry Grove, Eric Falkenstein, Ron Simons, John Legend / Mike Jackson and Ken Wirth
2017 (71st)	Lillian Hellman's The Little Foxes	Manhattan Theatre Club, Lynne Meadow and Barry Grove
2017 (71st)	Present Laughter	Jordan Roth, Jujamcyn Theaters, Spencer Ross, Bruce Robert Harris and Jack W. Batman, AC Orange Entertainment Ltd., Grove Entertainment, Stephanie P. McClelland, Eric Falkenstein, Harbor Entertainment, Joe Everett Michaels/Robert F. Ryan and Daryl Roth
2017 (71st)	Six Degrees of Separation	Stuart Thompson, Louise L. Gund, Tim Levy, John Breglio, Scott M. Delman, Tulchin Bartner Productions, Franki De La Vega, Jane Bergère, John Gore, Gregory Holt, The Lowy Salpeter Company and Laruffa Hysell Group
2018 (72nd)
2018 (72nd)	Angels in America	Tim Levy for NT America, Jordan Roth, Rufus Norris & Lisa Burger for the National Theatre, Elliott & Harper Productions, Kash Bennett for NT Productions, Aged in Wood, The Baruch-Viertel-Routh-Frankel Group, Jane Bergère, Adam Blanshay Productions, Catwenjam Productions, Jean Doumanian, Gilad-Rogowsky, Gold-Ross Productions, John Gore Organization, Grove Entertainment, Harris Rubin Productions, Hornos-Moellenberg, Brian & Dayna Lee, Benjamin Lowy, Stephanie P. McClelland, David Mirvish, Mark Pigott, Jon B. Platt, E. Price-LD Ent., Daryl Roth, Catherine Schreiber, Barbara Whitman, Jujamcyn Theaters, The Nederlander Organization and The Shubert Organization
2018 (72nd)	The Iceman Cometh	Scott Rudin, Barry Diller, Eli Bush, Universal Theatrical Group, Eric Falkenstein, Dan Frishwasser, John Gore Organization, James L. Nederlander, Peter May, Stephanie P. McClelland, Candy Spelling, Stephen C. Byrd and Alia Jones-Harvey, Gavin Kalin Productions, Patty Baker, Caiola Productions, Diana DiMenna, David Mirvish, Wendy Federman and Heni Koenigsberg, Benjamin Lowy and Adrian Salpeter, Jason Blum, Joey Parnes, Sue Wagner and John Johnson
2018 (72nd)	Lobby Hero	2ndStage, Carole Rothman, Casey Reitz and Christopher Burney
2018 (72nd)	Three Tall Women	Scott Rudin, Barry Diller, Eli Bush, John Gore Organization, James L. Nederlander, Candy Spelling, Len Blavatnik, Universal Theatrical Group, Rosalind Productions, Inc., Eric Falkenstein, Peter May, Jay Alix & Una Jackman, Patty Baker, Diana DiMenna, David Mirvish, Wendy Federman & Heni Koenigsberg, Benjamin Lowy & Adrian Salpeter, Jason Blum, Jamie deRoy, Gabrielle Palitz, Ted Snowdon, Richard Winkler, Joey Parnes, Sue Wagner and John Johnson
2018 (72nd)	Travesties	Roundabout Theatre Company, Todd Haimes, Julia C. Levy, Sydney Beers, Steve Dow, Chocolate Factory Productions, Sonia Friedman Productions and David Babani
2019 (73rd)
2019 (73rd)	The Boys in the Band	Mart Crowley (author); David Stone, Scott Rudin, Patrick Catullo, Aaron Glick and Ryan Murphy
2019 (73rd)	All My Sons	Roundabout Theatre Company, Todd Haimes, Julia C. Levy, Sydney Beers and Steve Dow
2019 (73rd)	Burn This	David Binder, Ruth Hendel, Big Beach, Sharon Karmazin, OHenryGS Productions, Ken Schur, Jayne Baron Sherman, Cynthia Stroum, Barbara Whitman, Richard Willis, Adam Zotovich, The Shubert Organization, Ambassador Theatre Group, Eric Schnall, Wendy Orshan and Jeffrey M. Wilson
2019 (73rd)	Torch Song	Harvey Fierstein (author); Richie Jackson, Eric Kuhn and Justin Mikita, Stephanie P. McClelland, Ken Fakler, David Mirvish, Lassen Blume / Karmen Boyz Productions, CJC & Priest / Judith Ann Abrams, Burnt Umber / True Love Productions, Caiola Productions / Torchbearers, Jujamcyn Theaters, Second Stage Theater, Carole Rothman and Casey Reitz
2019 (73rd)	The Waverly Gallery	Kenneth Lonergan (author); Scott Rudin, Eli Bush, John Gore Organization, Len Blavatnik, Columbia Live Stage, Stephanie P. McClelland, James L. Nederlander, Universal Theatrical Group, Eric Falkenstein, Suzanne Grant, Benjamin Lowy, Peter May, Al Nocciolino, Tulchin Bartner Productions, Patty Baker, Bob Boyett, Wendy Federman, Barbara H. Freitag, Heni Koenigsberg, David Mirvish, True Love Productions, Roxanne Seeman and Jamie deRoy, Jason Blum, The Shubert Organization, Joey Parnes, Sue Wagner and John Johnson

=== 2020s ===
Year	Play	Nominees
2020 (74th)
2020 (74th)	A Soldier's Play	Charles Fuller (author); Roundabout Theatre Company, Todd Haimes, Julia C. Levy, Sydney Beers and Steve Dow
2020 (74th)	Betrayal	Ambassador Theatre Group Productions, Benjamin Lowy Productions, Gavin Kalin Productions, Glass Half Full Productions, Annapurna Theatre, Hunter Arnold, Burnt Umber Productions, Rashad V. Chambers, Eilene Davidson Productions, KFF Productions, Dominick LaRuffa Jr., Antonio Marion, Stephanie P. McClelland, Smith and Brant Theatricals, Richard Winkler / Alan Shorr and The Jamie Lloyd Company
2020 (74th)	Frankie and Johnny in the Clair de Lune	Terrence McNally (author); Hunter Arnold, Debbie Bisno, Tom Kirdahy, Elizabeth Dewberry and Ali Ahmet Kocabiyik, Broadway Strategic Return Fund, Caiola Productions, FedermanGold Productions, Invisible Wall Productions, John Gore Organization, Mike Karns, Kilimanjaro Theatricals, Peter May, Tyler Mount, Seriff Productions, Silva Theatrical Group, Cliff Bleszinski / GetterLazarDaly, Jamie deRoy / Gary DiMauro, Suzi Dietz & Lenny Beer/Sally Cade Holmes, Barbara H. Freitag / Ken Davenport, Barry and Kimberly Gowdy / Mabee Family Office, Kayla Greenspan / Jamie Joeyen-Waldorf, John Joseph / Broadway Factor, Tilted Windmills / John Paterakis and The Shubert Organization
2022 (75th)
2022 (75th)	Take Me Out	Second Stage Theater, Carole Rothman and Khady Kamara
2022 (75th)	American Buffalo	Jeffrey Richards, Steve Traxler, Stephanie P. McClelland, GFour Productions, Spencer Ross, Gemini Theatrical, Chris and Ashlee Clarke, Suna Said Maslin, Ted and Richard Liebowitz / Cue to Cue Productions, Patty Baker/Good Productions, Brad Blume, Caiola Productions, Joanna Carson, Arthur Kern, Willette Klausner, Jeremiah J. Harris and Darren P. Deverna, Van Kaplan, Patrick Myles / David Luff, Alexander Marshall, Ambassador Theatre Group, Kathleen K. Johnson, Diego Kolankowsky, Steve and Jacob Levy, Morwin Schmookler, Brian Moreland, Jacob Soroken Porter and The Shubert Organization
2022 (75th)	for colored girls who have considered suicide/when the rainbow is enuf	Nelle Nugent, Ron Simons, Kenneth Teaton, Ellen Ferguson and Vivian Phillips, Willette and Manny Klausner, Hunter Arnold, Dale Franzen, Valencia Yearwood, One Community, Audible, Dennis Grimaldi, Terry Nardozzi and Tracey Knight Narang, Grace Nordhoff/Mickalene Thomas, Angelina Fiordellisi/Caiola Productions, The Public Theater, Oskar Eustis, Patrick Willingham and Mandy Hackett
2022 (75th)	How I Learned to Drive	Paula Vogel (author); Manhattan Theatre Club, Lynne Meadow, Barry Grove, Daryl Roth, Cody Lassen and Vineyard Theatre
2022 (75th)	Trouble in Mind	Roundabout Theatre Company, Todd Haimes, Julia C. Levy, Sydney Beers and Steve Dow
2023 (76th)
2023 (76th)	Suzan-Lori Parks' Topdog/Underdog	David Stone, LaChanze, Rashad V. Chambers, Marc Platt, Debra Martin Chase and The Shubert Organization
2023 (76th)	A Doll's House	Amy Herzog (new version by); Ambassador Theatre Group Productions, Gavin Kalin Productions, Wessex Grove, Julie Boardman, Kate Cannova, Bob Boyett, Hunter Arnold, Creative Partners Productions, Eilene Davidson Productions, GGRS, Kater Gordon, Louise L. Gund, Los Angeles Media Fund, Stephanie P. McClelland, Tilted, Jessica Chastain, Caitlin Clements/Francesca Moody Productions, Caiola Productions/Amanda Lee, Ted and Richard Liebowitz / Joeyen-Waldorf Squeri, Richard and Cécilia Attias / Thomas S. Barnes, OHenry Theatre Nerd Productions / Runyonland MMP and The Jamie Lloyd Company
2023 (76th)	August Wilson's The Piano Lesson	Brian Anthony Moreland, Sonia Friedman, Tom Kirdahy, Kandi Burruss and Todd Tucker, Hunter Arnold, Playing Field, The Factor Gavin Partnership, FBK Productions / 42nd.club, Jay Alix and Una Jackman, Creative Partners Productions, Harris Rubin Productions, Marguerite Steed Hoffman, Alia Jones-Harvey, Mark Gordon Pictures, Stephanie McClelland, Moore Delman, James L. Nederlander, Seriff Productions, The Shubert Organization, Salman Al-Rashid / Jamie deRoy, Brad Blume/Cliff Hopkins, Jean Doumanian /Fakston Productions, Edgewood/DMQR Productions, Jay & Cindy Gutterman/Caiola Productions, Van Kaplan/Lu-Shawn Thompson, Erik A. King/Finewomen Productions, Marc David Levine/William Frisbie, Syrinda Paige/Kevin Ryan & Diane Scott Carter, Silva Theatrical Group/Tilted, Thomas Swayne/Cynthia J. Tong and Constanza Romero-Wilson
2023 (76th)	The Sign in Sidney Brustein's Window	Seaview, Sue Wagner, John Johnson, Phil Kenny, Audible, Sony Music Masterworks, Jillian Robbins, Jeremy O. Harris, Larry Hirschhorn and Ricardo Hornos, Shields Smedes Stern Ltd., Kevin Ryan, The Shubert Organization, Willette and Manny Klausner, Marco Santarelli, Be Forward Productions, Concord Theatricals, Creative Partners Productions, Invisible Wall Productions, Salman and Moudhy Al-Rashid, TodayTix Group, Ido Gal, HarrisDonnelly, Sally Cade Holmes, Stella LaRue, LAMF Protozoa, Kati Meister and John Sorkin, Meredith Lynsey Schade, Catherine Schreiber, Dennis Trunfio, MCM Studios, 42nd.club, BAMM Productions, CarterMackTaylorWilliam, HB2M Productions, HK-Undivided Productions, MAJIKK Theatricals, Tanker Kollev Productions, Douglas Denoff, OHenry Productions, Plate Spinner Productions, Runyonland Productions, Mad Gene Media, Scrap Paper Pictures, Joi Gresham, BAM, Gina Duncan, David Binder and Elizabeth Moreau
2024 (77th)
2024 (77th)	Appropriate	Branden Jacobs-Jenkins (author); Second Stage Theater, Carole Rothman, Lisa Lawer Post, Ambassador Theatre Group, Amanda Dubois, Annapurna Theatre and Bad Robot Live
2024 (77th)	An Enemy of the People	Amy Herzog (new version by); Seaview, Patrick Catullo, Plan B Entertainment, Roth-Manella Productions, Eric & Marsi Gardiner, John Gore Organization, James L. Nederlander, Jon B. Platt, Atekwana Hutton, Bob Boyett, Chris & Ashlee Clarke, Cohen-Demar Productions, Andrew Diamond, GI6 Productions, Sony Music Masterworks, Triptyk Studios, Trunfio Ryan, Kate Cannova and DJL Productions
2024 (77th)	Purlie Victorious: A Non-Confederate Romp through the Cotton Patch	Jeffrey Richards, Hunter Arnold, Leslie Odom Jr., Louise Gund, Bob Boyett, Curt Cronin, John Joseph, Willette and Manny Klausner, Brenda Boone, Salman Moudhy Al-Rashid, Creative Partners Productions, Irene Gandy, Kayla Greenspan, Mark and David Golub Productions, Kenny Leon, John Gore Organization, W3 Productions, Morwin Schmookler, Van Kaplan, Ken Greiner, Patrick W. Jones, Nicolette Robinson, National Black Theatre, Alan Alda, LaTanya Richardson Jackson, Samuel L. Jackson, Phylicia Rashad, Nnamdi Asomugha, Kerry Washington and The Shubert Organization
2025 (78th)
2025 (78th)	Eureka Day	Jonathan Spector (author); Manhattan Theatre Club, Lynne Meadow, Chris Jennings and Nicki Junter
2025 (78th)	Thornton Wilder's Our Town	Jeffrey Richards, Samsational Entertainment, Louise Gund, Eric Falkenstein, Suzanne Grant, Patty Baker, Daryl Roth / Tom Tuft, Ronald Frankel, Rebecca Gold, Gabrielle Palitz, Brunish-Rooney-Hui / Laura Little, Thom and Karen Lauzon, Pamela Hurst-Della Pietra & Stephen Della Pietra, Score 3 Partners, Secret Hideout, David S. Stone, Craig Balsam, John Gore Organization, Caiola Productions, Concord Theatricals, Melissa & Bradford Coolidge, Irene Gandy, Kenny Leon, Willette & Manny Klausner, Andrew Marderian-Davis, Ellen Susman, Leslie Rainbolt, Randy Jones Toll & Steven Toll, James S. Levine, Hank Steinberg & Kara Steinberg, Alexander "Sandy" Marshall, Ken & Rande Greiner / David Schwartz & Trudy Zohn, Patrick W. Jones, Maia Kayla Glasman, Brandon J. Schwartz and The Shubert Organization
2025 (78th)	Romeo + Juliet	Seaview, Harbor Entertainment, Kevin Ryan, Eric & Marsi Gardiner, Roth-Manella Productions, Kate Cannova, J + J Productions, Julie Boardman, Alexander-Taylor Deignan, Atekwana Hutton, Bensmihen Mann Productions, Patrick Catullo, Chutzpah Productions, Corets Gough Willman Productions, Dave Johnson Productions, DJD Productions, Hornos Moellenberg, Pam Hurst-Della Pietra & Stephen Della Pietra, Mark Gordon Pictures, Oren Michels, No Guarantees Productions, Nothing Ventured Productions, Strus Lynch, Sunset Cruz Productions, Dennis Trunfio, Stephen C. Byrd, Fourth Wall Theatricals, Level Forward, Soto Productions and WMKlausner
2025 (78th)	Yellow Face	David Henry Hwang (author); Roundabout Theatre Company, Todd Haimes, Scott Ellis, Sydney Beers, Christopher Nave and Steven Showalter
2026 (79th)
2026 (79th)	Death of a Salesman	Scott Rudin, Barry Diller, Roy Furman, Composite Capital Partners, Cue to Cue Productions, Thomas Tuft, John Gore Organization, Peter May, The Shubert Organization, Jane Bergère, Corey Brunish & Spencer Dress, Lynne & Marvin Garelick, Bruce Robert Harris & Sean Nyberg, Alex Levy & Shari Redstone, Lloyd Tichio Productions, William C. Martin, Scott H. Mauro, Jeffrey Schoenberg, Emerald Drive and Al Nocciolino
2026 (79th)	Becky Shaw	Gina Gionfriddo (author); Second Stage Theater, Evan Cabnet, Adam Siegel and Creative Partners Productions
2026 (79th)	Every Brilliant Thing	Duncan Macmillan with Jonny Donahoe (authors); Second Half Productions, Seaview, Gavin Kalin Productions, Pam Hurst-Della Pietra & Stephen Della Pietra, Rodeo Productions and Tilted, Winkler & Smalberg, ZL Productions, Tom Tuft, Larry Lelli, Grace Street Creative, Salem Productions, Barbara Chiodo, Cohen-Gutterman Productions, The Array IX, Julie Boardman, Kate Cannova, Creative Partners Productions, JMB Collective, Mickey Liddell & Pete Shilaimon, Oren Michels, Carl Moellenberg, Origin Story Productions, Roth-Manella Productions, Echo Lake Entertainment, P3 Productions, Jamie deRoy and FineWomen Productions
2026 (79th)	Fallen Angels	Roundabout Theatre Company, Todd Haimes, Scott Ellis, Sydney Beers, Christopher Nave and Rebecca Habel
2026 (79th)	Oedipus	Robert Icke (author); Sonia Friedman Productions, Sue Wagner, John Johnson, Patrick Catullo, Jillian Robbins, Winkler & Smalberg, Stephanie P. McClelland, Alan Shorr, Tilted, Mickey Liddell & Pete Shilaimon, Jon B. Platt, John Gore Organization, Scott Abrams, No Guarantees, Adam Zell & Company, Christopher Ketner & Hunter Regian, Carl Moellenberg & Ricardo Hornos, Barbara Chiodo, Linda B. Rudin & PRLH Productions, The Shubert Organization, Nederlander Presentations, Willette & Manny Klausner, Charles & Charles, deRoy Adler, Garcia Haung, Kierstead & Laurence, Koenigsberg Federman Riley, Art Koski, Nick Padgett & Tom D'Angora, Carl & Jennifer Pasbjerg, Marj Press, John Voege, Richard Batchelder, William Berlind, Dodge Hall Productions, Craig Balsam & Bellanca Smigel Rutter, Goldfischer Sabi Turchin, Ordinary Magic & The Transatlantic Alliance, Ilona Rozwadowska & Max Cantor, The Araca Group, Jonathan Demar, Roundabout Theatre Company, Scott Ellis, Sydney Beers and Christopher Nave

== Multiple wins ==
4 wins

- Death of a Salesman

2 wins

- A View from the Bridge

== Multiple nominations ==
4 Nominations

- Death of a Salesman
- A View from the Bridge

3 Nominations

- The Iceman Cometh

2 Nominations

- Ah, Wilderness!
- All My Sons
- American Buffalo
- The Best Man
- Betrayal
- The Crucible
- A Day in the Death of Joe Egg
- A Doll's House
- Frankie and Johnny in the Clair de Lune
- Inherit the Wind
- The Little Foxes
- Long Day's Journey into Night
- The Merchant of Venice
- A Moon for the Misbegotten
- Morning's at Seven
- Noises Off
- Our Town
- Present Laughter
- The Price
- A Raisin in the Sun
- Twelfth Night
- Who's Afraid of Virginia Woolf?

== See also ==
- Tony Award for Best Play
- Drama Desk Award for Outstanding Revival of a Play
- Laurence Olivier Award for Best New Play
- List of Tony Award-nominated productions
