= Elizabeth Williams (producer) =

American producer (b. 1949/1950)

- Born: 1949 or 1950 (age 76–77); Arkadelphia, Arkansas
- Education: Columbia University
- Occupations: Archaeologist, Art Historian, Broadway Producer
- Years active: 1984–present
- Awards: Olivier Award: 1993; Tony Awards: 1993, 2000, 2001

Elizabeth Peck Williams is an American academic and a Dora-, Olivier- and Tony-Award-winning theater producer.

== Early life ==
Williams was born in Arkadelphia, Arkansas.

== Academic career ==
Williams completed her dissertation with honors for a Ph.D. in the History of Art with a specialization in the art of the Ancient Near East. She has taught art history of the ancient world at Columbia University, University of California, Berkeley, and UCLA. Williams has conducted both archaeological and ethnographic research in Turkey, and has given papers at numerous symposia on ancient art. She has also published articles on the iconography of the ancient gods of Syria. She has taught seminars at Columbia University and City University of New York, dealing with creative producing and the financing of shows on the international market.

== Theater career ==
Williams has produced a total of over 90 plays, including On and Off-Broadway, in London's West End, and on national and international tours around the United States, United Kingdom, Europe and Australia. Her career began in 1984 when, at the prompting of her friend Karen Goodwin who sought her expertise in the arts, Williams became a vice-president of Mutual Benefit Productions, initially while she also maintained her teaching position. Mutual Benefit Productions, a subsidiary of Mutual Benefit Life Insurance Company, funded a variety of arts projects including productions of plays such as Les Misérables, Miss Saigon, and Phantom of the Opera. The production of Les Misérables, which she and fellow producer Goodwin helped secure funding for, was very successful, playing London's West End, New York's Broadway, and major cities in the United States and elsewhere on tour. By contrast, Goodwin's and Williams's later production of Gospel at Colonus, though creatively innovative, was unsuccessful.

In 1989, Williams left Mutual Life to become an independent producer of musicals and other plays. Her production of author Frances Hodgson Burnett's The Secret Garden was "noted for its creative team of women" including the play's director, musical director, choreographer, and scenery designer; the playwright who adapted the novel for the stage; and Williams herself as producer. She earned her first Tony Award for the 1992 production of Crazy for You, a re-working of Girl Crazy by George and Ira Gershwin, which featured the Broadway debut of acclaimed director/choreographer Susan Stroman. Crazy for You also earned a Laurence Olivier Award, and the Drama Desk and Outer Critics Circle Awards for Best Musical. With co-producer Joan Stein, she put on 1993's Ruthless! in Los Angeles. Also in 1993, through her production company Four Corners Productions, Williams continued to produce The Secret Garden; the following year, she produced a renewed run of Crazy for You, which ran until 1996. Four Corners was also involved in a production of Into the Woods.

In 1998, Williams began a partnership with fellow producer Anita Waxman; their collaboration was responsible for the Studio 54 Cabaret (which ran until 2004), Electra, and A Night in November. The pair co-produced It Ain't Nothin' But the Blues in 1999. By 2000, they were producing five plays per year, all successful, an achievement New York magazine called "probably a record for female producers." That year, their joint venture already employed a staff of six, all women, even though they would not formally incorporate their partnership as Waxman Williams Entertainment until 2001. The five plays — A Moon for the Misbegotten, The Music Man, The Real Thing, and The Wild Party on Broadway, The Waverly Gallery Off-Broadway — earned both critical acclaim and a total of 24 Tony Awards among them; The Real Thing won the Tony Award for Best Revival of a Play that year. Their collaboration finally ended in 2007, when Williams founded her own production company, Grain of Sand Productions.

Further credits have included 2001's One Flew Over the Cuckoo's Nest, which also earned a Tony Award for Best Revival of a Play, and Noises Off; 2002's The Elephant Man, Flower Drum Song and Pulitzer Prize-winner Topdog/Underdog; 2003's Gypsy and Ragtime; 2004's Bombay Dreams, which Williams and her creative team re-worked from its British original to a version American audiences could more easily grasp — an adaptation then taken up by Andrew Lloyd Webber to replace the original UK version, as well as By The Bog of Cats and We're Still Hot; 2006's Hitchcock Blonde; 2011's Catch Me If You Can, Dirty Dancing, and Doctor Zhivago; and 2013's sister productions of No Man's Land and Waiting for Godot. Williams executive produced the Chicago run of First Wives Club in 2015.

Williams is represented off-Broadway with the hit improv/sketch/musical comedy #DateMe: an okcupid experiment.

== Television ==
In 2005, Williams, along with Waxman and The Carsey-Werner Company, was co-executive producer of a reality TV program, The Scholar, for ABC. Covering a competition among high school seniors for a prize that would pay for their college tuition and associated costs, the show aired in spring and summer of that year.

== Charitable involvement ==
Williams has been involved with charities supporting women in politics and social justice since her college days. She also been a member of the board of directors of the 52nd Street Project and Women's Commission For Refugees and chaired the boards of directors of The Broadway Fund and the New York Theatre Workshop. She has been the special guest at a THEA Foundation event. Williams has donated "most generously" toward the continuation of Columbia University's Department of Art History and Archaeology.

== TodayTix ==
In 2013, Williams was theatrical adviser to the then-startup company TodayTix, which provides an app for customers to purchase tickets to Broadway plays and other performances using mobile devices. "Any new ideas that come into the space that will provide shows a way to market their tickets is of interest to me, [...] We'll be able to reach audiences potentially who we haven't been able to reach before," she told the Associated Press, speaking about her work with TodayTix.

== Personal life ==
Williams is married to a fellow academic, who taught at Sarah Lawrence College, and whom she met while they were both graduate students in art history at Columbia University. They have one son, Alexander, who holds a Ph.D. from the Department of Classics, Harvard University and is now professor of Classics at NYU.

== Awards ==
- Crazy for You (producer)
  - 1992 Drama Desk Award for Outstanding Musical
  - 1993 Laurence Olivier Award for Best New Musical
  - 1991–1992 Outer Critics Circle Award for Best Broadway Musical
  - 1992–1993 Tony Award for Best Musical
- The Real Thing (producer)
  - 1999–2000 Tony Award for Best Revival of a Play
- One Flew Over the Cuckoo's Nest (producer)
  - 2000–2001 Tony Award for Best Revival of a Play

In 2005, Williams was inducted into the Arkansas Entertainers Hall of Fame in her home state.
