= Vivian Allen =

Vivian Allen may refer to:

- Vivian Beaumont Allen (1885–1962), American actress, philanthropist, and heiress
- Vivian Ayers Allen (1923–2025), American poet, playwright, cultural activist, museum curator and classicist

== See also ==
- Viv Allen (1916–1995), Canadian ice hockey player
