= Bernard Gersten =

American theatre producer (1923–2020)

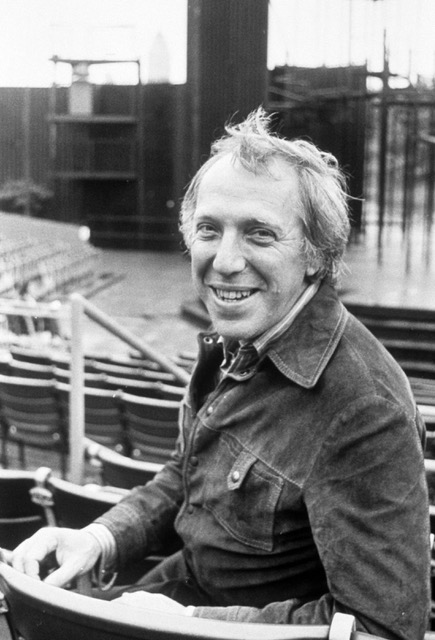
- Bernard Gersten at the Delacorte Theater in Central Park, circa 1967
- Born: January 30, 1923; Newark, New Jersey, U.S.
- Died: April 27, 2020 (aged 97); New York, New York, U.S.
- Occupation: Producer
- Partner: Cora Cahan

Bernard Gersten (January 30, 1923 – April 27, 2020) was an American theatrical producer. Beginning in the 1960s through the early 2000s, Gersten played a major role in shaping American drama and musical theatre.

From 1960 to 1978, Gersten worked with Joseph Papp as associate producer at the New York Shakespeare Festival. After leaving the NYSF, he served as executive producer of Lincoln Center Theater from 1985 until he retired in 2013, where (with Gregory Mosher, then with Andre Bishop) he oversaw over 150 productions.

In addition to receiving the Antoinette Perry Award (The "Tony Award") for Lifetime Achievement in 2013, Gersten was the recipient of fifteen Tony Awards for his productions.

He died from pancreatic cancer on April 27, 2020, at the age of 97.

== Personal life ==
Gersten was the son of Henrietta (Henig) Gersten and Jacob Israel Gersten, a garment worker and chauffeur. Gersten grew up in Newark, New Jersey, in a traditional Jewish immigrant household, crowded with relatives, his father Jacob holding the position of secretary at the local synagogue. Like his cohort, Joseph Papp, Gersten came to the theater from an unsophisticated middle-class background.

As a teenager, Gersten became interested in theater and acting during his time at West Side High School. Gersten was attending Rutgers University as the United States entered World War II following the Japanese attack on Pearl Harbor. He enlisted in the quartermaster corps and was stationed in Hawaii. He transitioned into special services after attending a performance on a base of Macbeth featuring the theater stars Maurice Evans (a Captain) and Dame Judith Anderson. Working on productions in the military, he developed his skills as a stage manager and producer.

== Early career ==
After World War II, Gersten got his Equity card and began his professional career when Maurice Evans asked him to become the Assistant Stage Manager of the US tour of "GI Hamlet" – starring Evans. Following his first professional gig, Gersten joined the Actor's Lab in Los Angeles, where he met his future colleague and co-producer, Joseph Papp. In the late 1950s, Gersten was hired by John Houseman to work as a stage manager at the American Shakespeare Festival in Stratford, Connecticut. He was active as a Broadway production stage manager at the American Shakespeare Festival in Stratford, Connecticut. His last job was as a Production Stage Manager (PSM) to the first performances of Funny Girl starring Barbra Streisand.

During the late 1940s and the 1950s, Gersten was politically active. He attended meetings of the Communist Party and worked on union organizing. Both he and Joseph Papp worked on behalf of Vice President Henry A. Wallace’s unsuccessful bid for the presidency in 1948 (as the candidate of the Progressive Party). He was also active on behalf of the plight of Julius and Ethel Rosenberg. In time, Gersten was investigated by the House Un-American Activities Committee and was required to appear before the committee in 1958. Gersten pled the 5th. (Papp was also brought before the committee.) Though he was threatened with dismissal, Gersten did not lose his job because both John Houseman and Katharine Hepburn spoke on his behalf.

== New York Shakespeare Festival ==
In 1960, Joseph Papp invited Gersten to work with him at the New York Shakespeare Festival. The job as associate producer became a full-time job in 1964. This began a long partnership during which Papp and Gersten established the New York Shakespeare Festival (NYSF) at the old Astor Library downtown while presenting a series of significant productions. During his tenure at the NYSF, it would become the pre-eminent non-profit theater in the United States. (Gersten would also produce at Lincoln Center’s Vivian Beaumont and Mitzi E. Newhouse (prior to 1973 the Forum) theaters during NYSF’s tenure there between 1974 and 1977.)

The eighteen year Papp/Gersten regime at the NYSF would usher in a new era of playwriting and musical theater. Well-known dramatists such as Liz Swados, David Rabe, Sam Shepard, Michael Bennett, Richard Foreman and John Guare as well as major stage stars including James Earl Jones, Meryl Streep, Sam Waterston Edward Herrmann and Al Pacino, George C. Scott and Colleen Dewhurst (not to mention the visual artist Paul Davis), got their first national attention at the NYSF. Productions during this period also included dozens of plays by William Shakespeare and free theater in Central Park. Notable productions during the Papp/Gersten era include an adaptation of Shakespeare’s Two Gentlemen of Verona, Hair, That Championship Season, For Colored Girls Who Have Considered Suicide/When the Rainbow is Enuf, Streamers, Buried Child and the crowning achievement of the NYSF during this period: the musical: A Chorus Line.

In 1968, Gersten married Cora Cahan, at the time touring as a dancer with various modern dance companies. (With Eliot Feld, Cora Cahan would establish and serve as executive director of Eliot Feld's dance company, Feld Ballet. In 1982, Cora and Eliot conceived and created the Joyce Theater. Since 1990, Cora has been President of The New 42nd Street, a non-profit organization generated by the city and the state as part of the 42nd Street Redevelopment Project.) The Gerstens have two children, Jenny Cahan Gersten and Jilian Cahan Gersten.

Perhaps Gersten's most significant contribution to the American theater was his realization that a non-profit theater could produce commercially. In what he has described as a ‘eureka moment’ he found a way to free the New York Shakespeare Festival and later the Lincoln Center Theater from dependency on commercial producers when moving a show to Broadway. Through this innovative approach to underwriting production, beginning with moving Two Gentlemen of Verona to Broadway in 1971, (and particularly with the success of A Chorus Line), the fortunes of the New York Shakespeare Festival grew enormously. Gersten's approach would change the course of non-profit institutions nationally and especially in New York City.

In 1978, Gersten and Papp went their separate ways when Gersten insisted that the NYSF produce Michael Bennett’s Ballroom. Papp fired Gersten, whereupon Gersten went on to independently produce Ballroom (as well as John Guare’s Bosoms and Neglect) on Broadway later that year.

== Zoetrope and Radio City Music Hall ==
In 1979, Gersten was invited by Francis Ford Coppola to come work for his new Zoetrope Studios as Executive Vice President of Creative Affairs. During his tenure at Zoetrope, Gersten would serve as Executive Producer of Francis Ford Coppola’s One From the Heart, as well as three other films. He also acted as Co-Producer of the live-orchestra presentations throughout the world of Abel Gance’s film Napoléon. After leaving Zoetrope, Gersten was recruited by Radio City Music Hall to serve as their Vice President to produce live original content. A highlight of his two and a quarter year tenure, was a massive production of Porgy and Bess, (featuring a 90-strong company).

== Lincoln Center Theater ==
In 1985, the Vivian Beaumont Theater, a component of the larger Lincoln Center performing arts complex, had been dark for four years. A board of directors headed by former New York Mayor John V. Lindsay decided to try one more time to activate the theater which had been built and established in the mid-sixties, but failed to establish itself as a viable theatrical venue. (This period includes the four years in which the NYSF produced at Lincoln Center.)

Gersten, at the time working for Alexander Cohen on Broadway and teaching as an adjunct professor of theater administration at Columbia University, was invited to act as a consultant on the board. (Source?) and proposed a way to organize the Beaumont. After Gregory Mosher was hired by Lindsay as Director of the theater in April 1985 Mosher approached Gersten, who was then hired as Executive Producer.Under Mosher and Gersten, the Vivian Beaumont and the Mitzi E. Newhouse theaters, moribund for nearly a decade, flourished. More than twenty productions followed in quick succession over the next five years, including several major successes (see Lincoln Center Theater). In 1991, Mr. Mosher announced that he would leave LCT to pursue other projects.

In 1991, Gersten invited Andre Bishop to take over as Artistic Director, and Bishop's tenure began in 1992. After Gersten's retirement, Bishop had the title of Producing Artistic Director. The long list of successes at Lincoln Center Theater grew under their partnership. For almost twenty years, Mr. Gersten and Mr. Bishop produced an award-winning series of top shelf theatrical productions, sparing no expense to achieve the most exacting artistic results. A number of plays produced at Lincoln Center Theater moved to Broadway (or were produced directly for Broadway). Muscular, precise, and visually striking theater became the hallmark of Lincoln Center Theater.

Bernard Gersten produced over 150 productions at LCT, including a revival of John Guare’s House of Blue Leaves and premiere of Six Degrees of Separation, Wendy Wasserstein’s Sisters Rosenzweig, Edward Albee’s A Delicate Balance, Ngema's Sarafina, David Mamet’s Speed the Plow, Tom Stoppard’s The Coast of Utopia and a revival of South Pacific. Under Gersten, the Lincoln Center Theater championed the work of Spalding Gray, John Guare, Edward Albee, Tom Stoppard and Wendy Wasserstein among the dozens of playwrights, composers, and directors who worked there, including Gerald Gutierrez, Jerry Zaks, Susan Stroman, Daniel Sullivan, Bartlett Sher and Graciele Daniele.

Prior to retirement from LCT, Gersten helped implement the fundraising, design, and construction of the new Claire Tow Theater atop the Vivian Beaumont.

Gersten implemented a new custom license plate for New York State featuring the slogan ‘State of the Arts.’ Income from this custom license plate supports the New York State Council on the Arts.

== Awards ==
Following is a selection of the awards won by Gersten.

=== American Theater Hall of Fame ===
- Inducted into the American Theater Hall of Fame, 2003

=== Drama Desk Awards ===
- Drama Desk Special Award for Revitalizing the Lincoln Center Theater, 2012

=== Tony Awards ===
- Antoinette Perry Award (Tony) for Lifetime Achievement, 2013
- Sticks and Bones Associate Producer, Best Play, 1971
- Two Gentlemen of Verona Associate Producer, Best Musical, 1971
- That Championship Season Associate Producer, Best Play 1973
- A Chorus Line Associate Producer, Best Musical, 1976
- Anything Goes Executive Producer, Best Revival of a Musical, 1989
- Our Town Executive Producer, Best Revival of a Play, 1989
- Carousel Executive Producer, Best Revival of a Musical, 1994
- The Heiress Executive Producer, Best Revival of a Play, 1995
- A Delicate Balance Executive Producer, Best Revival of a Play, 1996
- Contact Executive Producer, Best Musical, 2000
- Awake and Sing Executive Producer, Best Revival of a Play, 2006
- The Coast of Utopia Executive Producer, Best Play, 2007
- South Pacific Executive Producer, Best Revival of a Musical, 2008
- War Horse Executive Producer, Best Play, 2011
- Clybourne Park Executive Producer, Best Play, 2012
- Vanya and Sonia and Masha and Spike Executive Producer, Best Play, 2013
