= Brian Anthony Moreland =

American theater producer

Brian Anthony Moreland is an American theater producer best known for producing the 2025 revival of Othello, the 2024 revival of The Wiz, the 2022 revival of The Piano Lesson, and Thoughts of a Colored Man in 2021.

== Early life ==
Moreland grew up in Diamond Bar, California. His mother was a certified public accountant, and his father worked for the State of California with youth groups. His first experience with theater was in third grade, when he performed as Santa Claus. After studying theater at the University of Hartford, he moved to New York to pursue acting. He also worked as a dance captain, ticket-taker, and wardrobe assistant.

== Producing career ==
Moreland's first Broadway production as a producer was Lifespan of a Fact. He credits the producer Irene Gandy with introducing him to the play's producer, Jeffrey Richards. Richards recruited Moreland to become a co-producer for the show.

His first production as lead producer was Thoughts of a Colored Man in 2021. It was the first play on Broadway written, directed, and produced by and starring Black artists. Moreland said it took five years to bring the play to Broadway. Moreland's subsequent productions were the 2022 revival of August Wilson's The Piano Lesson, which was nominated for the Tony Award for Best Revival of a Play and won the Drama Desk Award for Outstanding Revival of a Play, and the 2024 revival of The Wiz.

Moreland produced the 2025 revival of Shakespeare's Othello starring Denzel Washington and Jake Gyllenhaal. In April 2025, the production broke the weekly record for top-grossing play in Broadway history with $2,824,493 in revenue. It later earned more than $3 million per week. Premium seats cost nearly $900 each. The production recouped its investment.

In 2025, Moreland announced he would produce Joe Turner's Come and Gone, written by August Wilson. The play is scheduled to open in the spring of 2026.

Moreland is actively involved in the Broadway industry. In 2021, Moreland was named to the board of governors of The Broadway League and serves as a trustee for Broadway Cares/Equity Fights AIDS.

Moreland is among the few Black producers who have worked on Broadway.

== Theater credits ==
- The Lifespan of a Fact (2018)
- Sea Wall/A Life (2019)
- The Sound Inside (2019)
- Thoughts of a Colored Man (2021)
- American Buffalo (2022)
- Funny Girl (2022)
- Macbeth (2022)
- The Piano Lesson (2022)
- The Wiz (2024)
- Othello (2025)
- Joe Turner's Come and Gone (2026)
