= Mutiny on the Buses =

1972 British comedy film by Harry Booth

- UK theatrical poster
- Directed by: Harry Booth
- Written by: Ronald Chesney; Ronald Wolfe
- Produced by: Ronald Chesney; Ronald Wolfe
- Starring: Reg Varney; Doris Hare; Bob Grant; Anna Karen; Michael Robbins; Stephen Lewis
- Cinematography: Mark McDonald
- Edited by: Archie Ludski
- Music by: Ron Grainer
- Production company: Hammer Films
- Distributed by: MGM-EMI Film Distributors
- Release date: 30 July 1972; (UK)
- Running time: 88 minutes
- Country: United Kingdom
- Language: English

Mutiny on the Buses is a 1972 British comedy film directed by Harry Booth and starring Reg Varney, Doris Hare, Michael Robbins, Anna Karen, Stephen Lewis and Bob Grant. It was produced by Ronald Chesney and Ronald Wolfe for Hammer Films. The film is the second spin-off film from the TV sitcom On the Buses and succeeded On the Buses (1971). It was followed by a third film, Holiday on the Buses (1973)." Mutiny on the Buses, while not as successful at the box office as the first, still came 17th in the 1972 box office.

== Plot ==
Stan Butler, a bus driver for the Town & District bus company, is so enamoured of a clippie from his company called Susy, that he agrees to marry her. While Jack, his close friend and colleague, welcomes the news, his family do not share the same view, with Stan's Mum unhappy that he will want to move out of the Butlers' house. Although Stan is eager to get married and to find Susy a flat for them to live in, he is forced to put things on hold when he becomes the main money earner for the Butler household, after Arthur loses his job. While trying to find his brother-in-law employment, Jack reveals news, overheard from Blakey, the company's bus inspector, that a new manager by the name of Mr. Jenkins has been installed into the depot, who seeks to make the buses profitable and has intentions to make reforms at the depot to ensure its staff work harder, much to the dislike of Stan and Jack who enjoy their current layabout lifestyle.

When Jenkins decides to stop the staff wearing casual, scruffy clothing under their uniform, Stan and Jack instigate a mutiny by having the male and female bus crews wear only the company's uniform that they are provided with, and nothing else. While this has little effect in stopping them having to wear smarter clothing with their uniforms, the stunt embarrasses Blakey and annoys Jenkins, who blames the Inspector for letting the staff get away with their prank. A few days later, Stan discovers that Jenkins is hiring new drivers and realises that this will provide the needed work for Arthur that can allow him to proceed with marrying Susy. In order to ensure this, Stan decides to teach Arthur how to drive a bus. However, his plans to get him properly trained soon become threatened when Jenkins has a new radio control system installed in all the buses, allowing Blakey to ensure that the buses are running on time while keeping the pair working hard. Seeking to stop management interfering with how they want to work, Jack tampers with the system so that it crosses over into other radio frequencies, effectively leading to several misunderstandings involving the police and airliners, before the police promptly order its discontinuation.

Soon after the radio system is removed, Jenkins issues Blakey with a new van, in order to help him monitor the bus routes more effectively. However, when Stan and Jack accidentally cause a fire at the depot, the staff quickly find that the fire-fighting equipment is woefully inadequate, resulting in chaos that leads to the inspector's new van being crushed between two buses whilst they are being moved out of the building. In the aftermath of the incident, Jenkins has the fire-fighting equipment upgraded and orders the inspector to stage a fire drill, but this only leads to mayhem when Stan and Jack flood the depot after breaking the depot's new foam machine. At the same time, Arthur, who secured a job at the company, is horrified when Olive arrives at the depot during the mayhem, and crashes the motorbike in the flooded maintenance pit, after believing that her husband had lied about the fire drill.

Despite Arthur now having a job, Stan discovers that he cannot afford a flat with the money he is earning, unless he can make more, and so is thrilled when Jenkins reveals to the bus crews that he is planning to arrange the company to run safari tours to Windsor Safari Park, whereupon the driver selected by him to drive the special bus for the tour will receive a larger wage and keep any tips they earn. However, any hope of Stan getting the job are dashed when Blakey informs him that, because both he and the depot manager agree that he is accountable for the mayhem with the fire drill, he will never be allowed to get the job. Later that evening, attending the company's darts competition in the busmen's canteen while debating on how to secure the safari job, trouble arises when he, Jack and Mum are forced to take Olive home, after she starts a fight with Arthur's clippie, Norah, for trying to flirt with her husband and getting more attention than herself. A couple of nights later, when they are in the depot after hours, Stan and Jack witness Jenkins having an affair with Norah and use the information to blackmail him into giving Stan the safari job, much to Blakey's shock.

A few days later, Stan prepares for the first run – a trial run to determine if the safari park will accept buses on its ground. While Stan is delighted with the new uniform he is provided with, and the special safari bus he will be driving, he accidentally damages the bus's rear emergency exit, resulting in the trial run being a complete disaster when it leaves him and Blakey, assigned to supervise the run, at the mercy of lions and monkeys. With their engagement on the rocks following the incident, Stan persuades Susy to come to his family's house for tea the following night to talk things over. But when it is announced that Olive is pregnant again, an annoyed Susy realises that she will never be married and storms out of the Butler household, giving back her engagement ring to Stan in the process. The next day, Stan finds out from Jack that Jenkins's wife learnt of his affair with Norah and had him transferred to another depot as a result, while also learning that his friend is no longer on his bus. Instead, he is shocked to discover that Blakey will be joining him, after being demoted to a conductor for all the trouble caused recently, but is delighted to learn that three new, attractive clippies have arrived at the depot, one of whom, Gloria, is being put on Stan's bus. The story ends with Blakey preventing passengers getting on Stan's bus, much like Jack did at the beginning, while Stan gets a feeling of deja vu when he finds himself agreeing to marry Gloria.

== Cast ==
=== Main cast ===
- Reg Varney as Stan Butler
- Doris Hare as Mum
- Michael Robbins as Arthur Rudge
- Anna Karen as Olive
- Stephen Lewis as Inspector 'Blakey' Blake
- Bob Grant as Jack Harper
- Janet Mahoney as Susy
- Kevin Brennan as Mr Jenkins
- Pat Ashton as Norah
- Bob Todd as new inspector
- David Lodge as safari guard
- Tex Fuller as Harry
- Caroline Dowdeswell as Sandra
- Damaris Hayman as Mrs Jenkins
- Jan Rennison as Gloria
- Juliet Duncan as Gladys
- Michael Nightingale as pilot
- Roger Avon as policeman (safari park)
- Barry Linehan as policeman (patrol car)
- David Rowlands as policeman (on beat)
- Nicolette Chaffey as nurse
- Dervis Ward as angry passenger
- Wayne Westhorpe as Olive's baby
- Shirley English as woman getting off bus (uncredited)
- Harry Fielder as bus driver (uncredited)
- Alf Mangan as darts match guest (uncredited)
- Sally Osborne as nurse with wheelchair (uncredited)
- Caroline Munro as poster girl (uncredited)

== Production ==
Apart from the location work, the film was shot at EMI-MGM Elstree Studios in Hertfordshire, England.

The bus at the safari park in Mutiny on the Buses was NRN 607, a Metro-Cammell bodied Leyland Atlantean, new to Ribble Motor Services.

== Reception ==
=== Box office ===
The film was one of the most popular movies of 1972 at the British box office.

=== Critical ===
The Monthly Film Bulletin wrote: "More TV sitcom (situation comedy) transferred to the big screen, is shot in the same flat, one-dimensional style as its predecessor and appears even more hard up for humour. A typical joke taking literally an order to wear only company uniform to work ("no knickers for the girls", the distributors' handout gleefully explains), and baby's toilet habits are assumed throughout to have inherent comic qualities."

The Radio Times Guide to Films gave the film 1/5 stars, writing: "Things must have been bad at Hammer for the once-famous horror studio to resort to big screen TV spin-offs such as this woefully unfunny comedy based on the popular ITV series. You'd have thought there was simply no more mileage left in the jokes about Blakey's schedules, Olive and Arthur's marriage and Stan and Jack's allergy to work, but they managed to squeeze out a third movie Holiday on the Buses the following year."
