= Helen Stern Richards =

- Born: Helen Stern; 1917; Wichita Falls, Texas U.S.
- Died: April 11, 1983; New York City
- Occupations: Theatrical Press Agent and Manager
- Known for: Broadway plays and musicals

Helen Stern Richards (1917 – April 11, 1983) was an American theater manager and press agent in Broadway theatre.

== Life and career ==
Born in Wichita Falls, Texas, Richards was a graduate of the University of Texas. After graduation, she became assistant to the manager of a Texas radio station, where she ran her own daily radio program for women. From 1939 to 1944, Richards was co-owner and manager of a small theater in Oklahoma City.

Following her move to New York City, she worked with the composer Sigmund Romberg. She subsequently began work as a press agent for Broadway productions, handling the press for Don Juan in Hell, New Girl in Town, and the original production of West Side Story.

Following her 1983 death, Richards' collected papers were donated to the New York Public Library for the Performing Arts' Billy Rose Theatre Division.

Her son is Tony Award-winning theater producer Jeffrey Richards.
