= Duncan Weldon (producer) =

British theatre producer (1941–2019)

Duncan Weldon (19 March 1941 – 30 January 2019) was a British theatre producer who won the Tony Award for Best Revival of a Play in 2002 for Private Lives. He was married to the singer Helen Shapiro from 1967 until their divorce in 1971. He married his second wife, Janet Mahoney, in 1974; the couple had one daughter, Lucy, born in 1974. Mahoney and Weldon later divorced. He was married to Ann Sidney from 2005 until his death.
