= Janet Mahoney =

British actress (born 1938)

- Born: 1 January 1938 (age 88); Stoke Newington, London, England
- Occupation: Actress
- Years active: 1969–1985
- Spouse: Duncan Weldon (m. 1974, divorced)
- Children: 1

Janet Mahoney (born 1 January 1938) is an English actress who has appeared in film, theatre and television roles. She appeared in several films, including Doctor in Trouble (1970), Carry On Loving (1970) and Mutiny on the Buses (1972).

Her London stage roles included Carry on London, Cockie!, Anything Goes, The Maid of the Mountains, Ann Veronica, Come Spy with Me, and Irene. She also appeared in episodes of the television series Dad's Army and Up Pompeii!.

Mahoney married producer Duncan Weldon in 1974. The couple, who had one child, later divorced.

== Filmography ==
=== Film ===
Year	Title	Role	Notes
1970	Doctor in Trouble	Dawn Daley	
1970	Carry On Loving	Gay	
1972	Mutiny on the Buses	Susy	

=== Television ===
Year	Title	Role	Notes
1969	The Dick Emery Show	Various	Episode: #7.6
1970	Up Pompeii!	Virginia	Episode: “Vestal Virgins”
1972	Comedy Playhouse	Miss Pettifer	Episode: “Idle at Work”
1975	Dad’s Army	Doris the barmaid	Episode: “Ring Dem Bells”
1975-1985	The Two Ronnies	Various	5 episodes
1980	The Good Companions	Mamie Potter	2 episodes
1982	The Chinese Detective	Mrs Gaskell	Episode: “Pasts”
