= Richard Winkler (producer) =

American theater producer

- Born: May 20, 1948 (age 78)
- Website: www.redhangerproductions.com

Richard Winkler, born on May 20, 1948, is a distinguished American theatre producer with a prolific career, having produced numerous productions both on and off Broadway. Often taking on roles as a co-producer or investor, Winkler notably served as the enhancing producer for 42nd Street at the Goodspeed Opera House. Currently, he is in the process of developing an exciting new musical titled 3 Summers of Lincoln, which just completed a successful run at the La Jolla Playhouse, and expects to open on Broadway in the Autumn of 2026. Over the course of his career, Winkler has garnered an impressive eleven Tony Awards and nine Olivier Awards. For more information, his professional work can be explored at www.redhangerproductions.com.

== Early life ==
Richard was raised in Detroit, Michigan, where his early exposure to the performing arts was fostered by his mother, with whom he frequently attended theater productions. It was after seeing My Fair Lady that his passion for theater truly ignited, prompting him to actively participate in various theatrical endeavors. His commitment to the craft deepened during his time at the Interlochen Center for the Arts, where he honed his skills and developed a deeper appreciation for the art form. Afterward, Richard pursued his studies at the University of Michigan, ultimately building a career as a lighting designer that spanned over 35 years.

== Career ==
Richard Winkler's work as a lighting designer spans 35 years, during which he collaborated extensively with Tharon Musser. His portfolio encompasses a diverse range of theatrical genres, including plays, musicals, opera, concerts, and dance, with credits on Broadway, Off-Broadway, the West End, as well as in Australia, and through national and international tours. Notably, he has also contributed his expertise to Theatre Under The Stars (Houston). Today, Winkler applies his experience in the industry as a producer for Broadway, West End, and other international productions, having helped produced over 80 Broadway and West End productions.

Winkler's lighting designer credits include:The Play's The Thing, Scapino (play), The Wiz, Same Time, Next Year (play), A Chorus Line, Evita (musical), It's a Wonderful Life

Winkler's Broadway producing credits include: Oedipus 2026, Every Brilliant Thing 2026, Giant (play) 2026, Dog Day Afternoon (play) 2026, Glengarry Glen Ross 2025, Othello 2025, Good Night, and Good Luck (play) 2025,Real Women Have Curves (musical) 2025, Buena Vista Social Club (musical) 2025, Dead Outlaw 2025, The Roommate 2024, Once Upon A Mattress 2024, Sunset Boulevard 2024, Stereophonic 2024, Merrily We Roll Along 2024, Patriots 2024, The Who's Tommy 2024, Life of Pi 2023, Leopoldstadt 2022, Thoughts of a Colored Man 2021, The Lehman Trilogy 2021, Diana 2021, The Inheritance 2019, Betrayal 2019, Ain't Too Proud 2019, Be More Chill 2018, The Ferryman 2018, Three Tall Women 2018 , The Glass Menagerie 2017, The Cher Show (musical) 2017, 1984 2017, Sweat 2017, Come From Away 2017, Sunday in the Park With George 2017, Long Day's Journey into Night 2016, An Act of God 2016, China Doll 2015, King Charles III 2015, Something Rotten! 2015, Hand to God 2015, Lady Day at Emerson's Bar and Grill 2014, Disgraced 2014, You Can't Take it With You 2014,A Gentleman's Guide to Love and Murder 2013, A Night with Janis Joplin 2013, Vanya and Sonia and Masha and Spike 2013, Cinderella 2013, Nice Work If You Can Get It 2012, Catch Me If You Can 2011, Colin Quinn: Long Story Short 2010, La Bête 2010, La Cage Aux Folles 2010, Lend Me A Tenor 2010, All About Me 2010, A Little Night Music 2009, Memphis 2009, The Norman Conquests 2009

Winkler's West End producing credits include: Jesus Christ Superstar 2026, Romeo & Juliet 2026, The Spy Who Came in From the Cold 2026, Fiddler on the Roof 2025, 1536 (play) 2026, Teeth 'n' Smiles 2026, Miss Saigon UK Tour 2026, Giant (play) 2025, The Seagull 2025, Born with Teeth 2025, Inter Alia (play) 2025, Evita (musical) 2025, Stereophonic (play) 2025, Mrs. Warren's Profession 2025, Barcelona 2024, Sunset Boulevard 2025, All My Sons 2025, Woman in Mind 2025, The Years 2025, The Importance of Being Earnest 2025, The Producers 2025, Moon for the Misbegotten 2025, Manhunt 2025, Elektra 2025, Creakers 2024, The Curious Case of Benjamin Button (musical) 2024, Punch (play) 2024, Titanique 2024, The Years (play) 2024, Starlight Express 2024, Dr. Strangelove (play) 2024, 42 Balloons 2024, The Fifth Step 2024, Till the Stars Come Down 2024, Starter for Ten (musical) 2024, The Lehman Trilogy 2024, Elektra 2024, Stranger Things: The First Shadow 2024, Barcelona 2024, Oedipus 2024, Juno and the Paycock 2024, Two Strangers (Carry a Cake Across New York) 2024, Hello Dolly! 2024, Leopoldstadt 2020, Patriots 2023, Two Strangers (Carry a Cake Across New York) 2023, Standing at the Sky's Edge 2024, The Artist 2024, Macbeth 2024, Long Day's Journey Into Night 2024, Kathy and Stella Solve a Murder! 2024, The Hills of California 2024, An Enemy of the People 2024, A Mirror 2024, Dear England 2023, The Doctor 2019, Betrayal 2019, Everybody's Talking About Jamie 2017, Hamlet 2017, The Lehman Trilogy, The Ferryman 2017, Mother Goose 2022, Urinetown 2014, Come From Away 2023, Starlight Express 2024, War Horse 2024, The Inheritance 2018, Home, I'm Darling 2019, Memphis 2014

== Awards and nominations ==
Winkler was nominated in 2019 for Broadway Global's Producer of the Year Award.

Tony Awards:

- Sunset Boulevard
- Merrily We Roll Along
- Stereophonic
- Leopoldstadt
- The Lehman Trilogy
- The Inheritance
- The Ferryman
- Memphis
- Vanya and Sonia and Masha and Spike
- La Cage aux Folles
- The Norman Conquests

Laurence Olivier Awards:

- The Curious Case of Benjamin Button (musical)
- Titanique
- Oedipus
- Dear England
- Leopoldstadt
- The Inheritance
- Come from Away
- Home, I'm Darling
- Long Day's Journey into Night

Year	Show	Award	Category	Result
2026	Giant	Tony Award	Best Play	Nominated
2026	Giant	Outer Critics Circle Awards	Outstanding New Broadway Play	Nominated
2026	Giant	Drama League Awards	Outstanding Production of a Play	Nominated
2026	Evita	Olivier Award	Best Revival of a Musical	Nominated
2026	Every Brilliant Thing	Tony Award	Best Revival of a Play	Nominated
2026	Every Brilliant Thing	Olivier Award	Best New Entertainment or Comedy Play	Nominated
2026	Every Brilliant Thing	Drama League Award	Outstanding Revival of a Play	Nominated
2026	Dog Day Afternoon	Drama League Award	Outstanding Production of a Play	Nominated
2026	Oedipus	Tony Award	Best Revival of a Play	Nominated
2026	Oedipus	Outer Critics Circle Awards	Outstanding New Broadway Play	Nominated
2025	Dead Outlaw	Tony Awards	Best Musical	Nominated
2025	Dead Outlaw	Drama League Awards	Outstanding Productions of a Musical	Nominated
2025	Sunset Blvd.	Tony Awards	Best Revival of a Musical	Won
2025	Sunset Blvd.	Drama Desk Awards	Outstanding Revival of a Musical	Nominated
2025	Sunset Blvd.	Outer Critics Circle Awards	Outstanding Revival of a Musical	Nominated
2025	Sunset Blvd.	Drama League Awards	Outstanding Revival of a Musical	Won
2025	Glengarry Glen Ross	Drama League Awards	Outstanding Revival of a Play	Nominated
2025	Glengarry Glen Ross	Outer Critics Circle Awards	Outstanding Revival of a Play	Nominated
2025	Good Night, and Good Luck	Drama League Awards	Outstanding Production of a Play	Nominated
2025	Othello	Drama League Awards	Outstanding Revival of a Play	Nominated
2025	Once Upon A Mattress	Drama League Awards	Outstanding Revival of a Musical	Nominated
2025	Once Upon A Mattress	Drama Desk Awards	Outstanding Revival of a Musical	Nominated
2025	Once Upon A Mattress	Outer Critics Circle Awards	Outstanding Revival of a Musical	Nominated
2025	Vanya	Drama League Awards	Outstanding Revival of a Play	Nominated
2025	Vanya	Outer Critics Circle Awards	Outstanding Revival of a Play	Nominated
2025	Vanya	Lucille Lortel Awards	Outstanding Solo Show	Won
2025	The Big Gay Jamboree	Outer Critics Circle Awards	Outstanding New Off Broadway Musical	Nominated
2025	The Curious Case of Benjamin Button	Laurence Olivier Awards	Best New Musical	Won
2025	Titanique	Laurence Olivier Awards	Best New Entertainment or Comedy Play	Won
2025	Oedipus	Laurence Olivier Awards	Best Revival	Won
2025	The Years	Laurence Olivier Awards	Best New Play	Nominated
2025	Starlight Express	Laurence Olivier Awards	Best Musical Revival	Nominated
2025	Hello, Dolly!	Laurence Olivier Awards	Best Musical Revival	Nominated
2024	Stereophonic	Tony Awards	Best Play	Won
2024	Stereophonic	New York Drama Critic's Circle Awards	Best Play	Won
2024	Stereophonic	Outer Critics Circle Awards	Outstanding Production of a Play	Won
2024	Stereophonic	Drama League Awards	Outstanding Production of a Play	Won
2024	Merrily We Roll Along	Drama League Awards	Outstanding Revival of a Musical	Won
2024	Merrily We Roll Along	Tony Awards	Best Revival of a Musical	Won
2024	Merrily We Roll Along	New York Drama Critics' Circle Award		Honored
2024	Patriots	Drama League Awards	Outstanding Production of a Play	Nominated
2024	Patriots	Outer Critics Circle Awards	Outstanding New Broadway Play	Nominated
2024	The Who's Tommy	Tony Awards	Best Revival of a Musical	Nominated
2024	The Who's Tommy	Drama League Awards	Outstanding Revival of a Musical	Nominated
2024	The Who's Tommy	Outer Critics Circle Awards	Outstanding Revival of a Musical	Nominated
2023	Stereophonic	Lucille Lortel Awards	Outstanding Play	Won
2023	Stereophonic	Drama Desk	Outstanding Play	Won
2023	Merrily We Roll Along	Drama Desk	Outstanding Revival of a Musical	Nominated
2023	Merrily We Roll Along	Lucille Lortel Awards	Outstanding Revival	Nominated
2023	Merrily We Roll Along	Outer Critics Circle Awards	Outstanding Revival of a Musical (On or Off-Broadway)	Nominated
2023	Merrily We Roll Along	Off-Broadway Alliance Awards	Outstanding Revival of a Musical	Won
2023	Leopoldstadt	Tony Awards	Best Play	Won
2023	Leopoldstadt	Drama Desk Awards	Outstanding Play	Won
2023	Leopoldstadt	Drama League Awards	Outstanding Production of a Play	Won
2023	Leopoldstadt	Outer Critics Circle Awards	Outstanding New Broadway Play	Won
2023	Life of Pi	Drama League Awards	Outstanding Production of a Play	Nominated
2023	Life of Pi	Outer Critics Circle Awards	Outstanding New Broadway Play	Nominated
2022	The Lehman Trilogy	Tony Award	Best Play	Won
2022	The Lehman Trilogy	Outer Critics Circle Awards	Outstanding New Broadway Play	Won
2022	The Lehman Trilogy	Drama League Awards	Outstanding Production of a Play	Won
2022	Cinderella (Lloyd Webber Musical)	WhatsOnStage Awards	Best New Musical	Nominated
2022	Cinderella (Lloyd Webber Musical)	Grammy Awards	Best Musical Theatre Album	Nominated
2020	The Inheritance	Tony Awards	Best Play	Won
2020	The Inheritance	Drama Desk Awards	Outstanding Play	Won
2020	The Inheritance	Drama League Awards	Outstanding Production of a Play	Won
2020	The Inheritance	New York Drama Critics' Circle Award	Best Play	Finalist
2020	The Inheritance	Outer Critics Circle Awards	Outstanding New Broadway Play	Honored
2020	Leopoldstadt	Laurence Olivier Award	Best New Play	Won
2020	Betrayal	Tony Awards	Best Revival of a Play	Nominated
2020	Betrayal	Drama League Awards	Outstanding Revival of a Play	Nominated
2020	Betrayal	Outer Critics Circle Awards	Outstanding Revival of a Play	Nominated
2019	The Ferryman	Tony Awards	Best Play	Won
2019	The Ferryman	Drama Desk Awards	Outstanding Play	Won
2019	The Ferryman	Drama League Awards	Outstanding Production of a Broadway or Off-Broadway Play	Won
2019	The Ferryman	New York Drama Critics' Circle Award	Best Play	Won
2019	The Ferryman	Outer Critics Circle Award	Outstanding New Broadway Play	Won
2019	The Ferryman	Laurence Olivier Award	Best New Play	Won
2019	The Ferryman	Critics' Circle Theatre Award	Best New Play	Won
2019	The Ferryman	Evening Standard Theatre Award	Best Play	Won
2019	Ain't Too Proud	Grammy Awards	Best Musical Theater Album	Nominated
2019	Ain't Too Proud	Drama League Awards	Outstanding Production of a Broadway or Off-Broadway Musical	Nominated
2019	Three Tall Women	Tony Awards	Best Revival of a Play	Nominated
2019	Three Tall Women	Drama Desk Awards	Outstanding Revival of a Play	Nominated
2019	Three Tall Women	Drama League Awards	Outstanding Revival of a Broadway or Off-Broadway Play	Nominated
2019	Three Tall Women	Outer Critics Circle Awards	Outstanding Revival of a Play (Broadway or Off-Broadway)	Nominated
2019	Be More Chill	Lucille Lortel Awards	Outstanding Musical	Nominated
2019	Be More Chill	Drama Desk Awards	Outstanding Musical	Nominated
2019	Be More Chill	Outer Critics Circle Awards	Outstanding New Broadway Musical	Nominated
2017	Come From Away	Tony Awards	Best Musical	Nominated
2017	Come From Away	Grammy Awards	Best Musical Theater Album	Nominated
2017	Come From Away	Laurence Olivier Awards	Best New Musical	Won
2017	Come From Away	Drama Desk Awards	Outstanding Musical	Won
2017	Come From Away	Drama League Awards	Outstanding Production of a Broadway or Off-Broadway Production	Nominated
2017	Come From Away	Outer Critics Circle Awards	Outstanding New Broadway Musical	Won
2017	Sweat	Pulitzer Prize	Drama	Won
2017	Sweat	Tony Awards	Best Play	Nominated
2017	Sweat	Drama Desk Awards	Outstanding Play	Nominated
2017	Sweat	Evening Standard Awards	Play of the Year	Won
2017	The Cher Show	Drama League Awards	Outstanding Production of a Broadway or Off-Broadway Musical	Nominated
2016	Long Day's Journey Into Night	Tony Awards	Best Revival of a Play	Nominated
2016	Long Day's Journey Into Night	Drama Desk Awards	Outstanding Revival of a Play	Nominated
2016	Long Day's Journey Into Night	Outer Critics Circle Awards	Outstanding Revival of a Play	Won
2016	Long Day's Journey Into Night	Drama League Awards	Distinguished Revival of a Play	Nominated
2015	King Charles III	Tony Awards	Best Play	Nominated
2015	King Charles III	Laurence Olivier Awards	Best New Play	Won
2015	King Charles III	Drama Desk Awards	Outstanding Play	Nominated
2015	Something Rotten!	Tony Award	Best Musical	Nominated
2015	Something Rotten!	Grammy Awards	Best Musical Theater Album	Nominated
2015	Something Rotten!	Drama Desk Awards	Outstanding Musical	Nominated
2015	Something Rotten!	Outer Critics Circle Awards	Outstanding New Broadway Musical	Nominated
2015	Something Rotten!	Drama League Awards	Outstanding Production of a Broadway or Off-Broadway Musical	Nominated
2015	Memphis	Laurence Olivier Awards	Best New Musical	Nominated
2015	Disgraced	Tony Awards	Best Play	Nominated
2015	Hand to God	Tony Awards	Best Play	Nominated
2015	Hand to God	Drama League Awards	Distinguished Production of a Play	Nominated
2015	A Gentleman's Guide to Love and Murder	Grammy Awards	Best Musical Theatre Album	Nominated
2014	You Can't Take it With You	Tony Awards	Best Revival of a Play	Nominated
2014	You Can't Take it With You	Drama League Awards	Distinguished Revival of a Play	Won
2014	Lady Day at Emerson's Bar and Grill	Outer Critics Circle Awards	Outstanding Revival of a Musical	Nominated
2014	The Glass Menagerie	Tony Awards	Best Revival of a Play	Nominated
2014	The Glass Menagerie	Drama League Awards	Distinguished Revival of a Play	Won
2014	The Glass Menagerie	Outer Critics Circle Awards	Outstanding Revival of a Play	Won
2014	A Gentleman's Guide to Love and Murder	Tony Awards	Best Musical	Won
2014	A Gentleman's Guide to Love and Murder	Drama Desk Awards	Outstanding Musical	Won
2014	A Gentleman's Guide to Love and Murder	Outer Critics Circle Awards	Outstanding New Broadway Musical	Won
2014	A Gentleman's Guide to Love and Murder	Drama League Awards	Best Musical Theatre Album	Won
2013	Vanya and Sonia and Masha and Spike	Tony Awards	Best Play	Won
2013	Vanya and Sonia and Masha and Spike	Drama Desk Awards	Outstanding Play	Won
2013	Vanya and Sonia and Masha and Spike	Outer Critics Circle Awards	Outstanding New Broadway Play	Won
2013	Vanya and Sonia and Masha and Spike	Drama League Awards	Distinguished Production of a Play	Won
2013	Vanya and Sonia and Masha and Spike	New York Drama Critics Circle	Best Play	Won
2013	Cinderella	Tony Awards	Best Revival of a Musical	Nominated
2013	Cinderella	Drama League Awards	Outstanding Revival of a Broadway or Off-Broadway Musical	Nominated
2013	Cinderella	Outer Critics Circle Awards	Outstanding Revival of a Musical (Broadway or Off-Broadway)	Nominated
2012	Nice Work If You Can Get It	Tony Awards	Best Musical	Nominated
2012	Nice Work If You Can Get It	Grammy Awards	Best Musical Theater Album	Nominated
2012	Nice Work If You Can Get It	Drama Desk Awards	Outstanding Musical	Nominated
2012	Nice Work If You Can Get It	Drama League Awards	Distinguished Production of a Musical	Won
2011	Catch Me If You Can	Tony Awards	Best Musical	Nominated
2010	La Cage Aux Folles	Tony Award	Best Revival of a Musical	Won
2010	La Cage Aux Folles	Laurence Olivier Award	Best Musical Revival	Won
2010	La Cage Aux Folles	Drama Desk Award	Outstanding Revival of a Musical	Won
2010	Lend Me a Tenor	Tony Award	Best Revival	Nominated
2010	Lend Me a Tenor	Outer Critics Circle Award	Outstanding Revival	Nominated
2009	A Little Night Music	Tony Award	Best Revival of a Musical	Nominated
2009	A Little Night Music	Grammy Awards	Best Musical Theatre Album	Nominated
2009	A Little Night Music	Olivier Awards	Best Revival of a Musical	Nominated
2009	A Little Night Music	Drama Desk Award	Outstanding Revival of a Musical	Nominated
2009	A Little Night Music	Outer Critics Circle Award	Outstanding Revival of a Musica	Nominated
2009	Memphis	Tony Award	Best Musical	Won
2009	Memphis	Drama Desk Award	Outstanding Musical	Won
2009	Memphis	Laurence Olivier Award	Best New Musical	Nominated
2009	The Norman Conquests	Tony Award	Best Revival of a Play	Won
2009	The Norman Conquests	Drama Desk Awards	Outstanding Revival of a Play	Won
2009	The Norman Conquests	Outer Critics Circle Awards	Outstanding Revival of a Play	Won
