= Jeffrey Richards (producer) =

American Broadway theatre producer

- Born: March 16, 1947 (age 79); New York City, U.S.
- Occupation: Theatrical producer
- Known for: Broadway plays and musicals
- Parent: Helen Stern Richards

Jeffrey Richards (born March 16, 1947) is an American Broadway theatre producer who has presented both new and revived works for the Broadway stage. His most notable productions include Spring Awakening, August: Osage County, Will Ferrell's You're Welcome America, and Porgy and Bess, as well as numerous premieres by Tracy Letts and David Mamet. He is the recipient of nine Tony Awards.

Richards was nominated for a 2020 Primetime Emmy Award as one of four executive producers of the dramatic film American Son, an adaptation of the 2018 Broadway play of the same title. The film premiered in 2019 at the Toronto International Film Festival, debuted in November 2019 as a television drama, and was nominated for the 2020 Primetime Emmy Award for Outstanding Television Movie.

== Early life ==
Born and raised in New York City, Richards' mother, Helen Stern Richards, worked as a press agent and manager of many Broadway shows, a long list of which included notable musicals such as West Side Story and Shenandoah.

He attended Wesleyan University and Columbia Journalism School with the intention of becoming a journalist but changed direction, and chose instead to work a public relations job which led to his working on the revival of The Pajama Game (1973).

== Career ==
Richards initially worked as a press agent on and off Broadway for nearly two decades, and in 1995, ventured into theatrical production with the initial Off-Broadway production of The Complete Works of William Shakespeare (Abridged).

In 2000, Richards presented his first production on Broadway with a revival of Gore Vidal's The Best Man. He has since produced over 50 shows on Broadway (many in partnership with producer Jerry Frankel), receiving Tony Awards for his productions of David Mamet's Glengarry Glen Ross (2005); The Pajama Game (2006), Duncan Sheik and Steven Sater's Spring Awakening (2007), Tracy Letts's August: Osage County (2008), Hair (2009), Porgy and Bess (2012), Who's Afraid of Virginia Woolf? (2013), and Robert Schenkkan's All The Way (2014). He has been nominated for an additional 14 Tony Awards.

Richards was one of four executive producers who presented the 2019 American dramatic film, American Son, along with Rebecca Gold, and Kerry Washington and Pilar Savone under their Simpson Street banner. The film is an adaptation of the 2018 Broadway play of the same title, written by Christopher Demos-Brown. The movie premiered in 2019 at the Toronto International Film Festival, and made its television debut on Netflix in November 2019 as a "Netflix Television Event". Despite the film's critical reception, it was nominated for the Primetime Emmy Award for Outstanding Television Movie.

== Broadway stage ==
Broadway productions and awards
Year	Production	Awards	Nominations
2000	The Best Man	Drama Desk Award for Outstanding Revival of a Play	
2001	A Thousand Clowns		
2003	Enchanted April		
2005	Glengarry Glen Ross	Tony Award for Best Revival of a Play	Drama Desk Award for Outstanding Revival of a Play
2006	Spring Awakening	Tony Award for Best Musical, Drama Desk Award for Outstanding Musical	
2006	The Caine Mutiny Court Martial		Drama Desk Award for Outstanding Revival of a Play
2006	The Pajama Game	Tony Award for Best Revival of a Musical	
2007	August: Osage County	Tony Award for Best Play, Drama Desk Award for Outstanding Play	
2007	Radio Golf		Tony Award for Best Play, Drama Desk Award for Best Play
2007	Talk Radio		Tony Award for Best Revival of a Play, Drama Desk Award for Outstanding Revival of a Play
2007	The Homecoming		Tony Award for Best Revival of a Play
2008	November		
2008	Speed-the-Plow		
2009	Blithe Spirit		Drama Desk Award for Outstanding Revival of a Play
2009	Desire Under the Elms		
2009	Hair	Tony Award for Best Revival of a Musical, Drama Desk Award for Outstanding Revival of a Musical	
2009	Race		
2009	Reasons To Be Pretty		Tony Award for Best Play, Drama Desk Award for Outstanding Play
2009	Superior Donuts		
2009	You're Welcome America		Tony Award for Best Special Theatrical Event
2010	A Life in the Theatre		
2010	All About Me		
2010	Bloody Bloody Andrew Jackson		
2010	Enron		
2010	The Merchant of Venice		Tony Award for Best Revival of a Play, Drama Desk Award for Outstanding Revival of a Play
2011	Bonnie and Clyde		Drama Desk Award for Outstanding Musical
2011	Chinglish		Drama Desk Award for Outstanding Play
2012	Glengarry Glen Ross		
2012	Porgy and Bess	Tony Award for Best Revival of a Musical	Drama Desk Award for Outstanding Revival of a Musical
2012	The Anarchist		
2012	The Best Man		Tony Award for Best Revival of a Play, Drama Desk Award for Outstanding Revival of a Play
2012	Who's Afraid of Virginia Woolf?	Tony Award for Best Revival of a Play, Drama Desk Award for Outstanding Revival of a Play	
2013	The Glass Menagerie		Tony Award for Best Revival of a Play
2014	All The Way	Tony Award for Best Play, Drama Desk Award for Outstanding Play	
2014	Lady Day at Emerson's Bar and Grill		
2014	The Bridges of Madison County		Drama Desk Award for Outstanding Musical
2014	The Realistic Joneses		
2014	You Can't Take It with You		Tony Award for Best Revival of a Play
2015	China Doll		
2015	Fiddler On The Roof		Tony Award for Best Revival of a Musical, Drama Desk Award for Outstanding Revival of a Musical
2015	Sylvia		
2015	The Heidi Chronicles		
2016	American Psycho		
2017	Significant Other		
2017	Sunday In The Park With George		
2018	American Son		
2018	The Lifespan of a Fact		
2019	Beetlejuice		Tony Award for Best Musical
2019	The Great Society		
2019	The Sound Inside		
2022	American Buffalo		Tony Award for Best Revival of a Play
2022	The Minutes		Tony Award for Best Play
2022	Ohio State Murders		Drama Desk Award for Outstanding Revival of a Play
2023	Pictures from Home		
2023	Purlie Victorious		Tony Award for Best Revival of a Play
2024	Maybe Happy Ending	Tony Award for Best Musical	
