= National Actors Theatre =

Tony Randall (Left) as Lamberto Laudisi in Pirandello's comedy "Right You Are," National Actors Theatre (2003)

The National Actors Theatre (NAT) was a theatre company founded in 1991 by actor Tony Randall, who served as the company's chairman. Randall stated he had long dreamed of creating such an organization. The company was originally housed at the Belasco Theatre, New York, but then moved to the nearby Lyceum Theatre, and in 2002 was based in the Michael Schimmel Center for the Arts at Pace University in New York City. NAT was the only professional theatre company housed in a university in New York City.

The company was dissolved following Randall's death in May, 2004.

Productions included such stars as Al Pacino, Matthew Broderick, Lynn Redgrave, Jack Klugman, Martin Sheen, John Goodman, Charles Durning, Jeff Goldblum, George C. Scott, Len Cariou, Maximilian Schell, Paul Giamatti, Steve Buscemi, Rob Lowe, Fritz Weaver, George Grizzard, Marthe Keller, Julie Harris, Robert Foxworth, Chazz Palminteri, Michael York, Michael Hayden, Billy Crudup, Dominic Chianese, Linda Emond, Earle Hyman, Roberta Maxwell, Michael O'Hare, Joseph Wiseman, Brennan Brown and Michael Stuhlbarg.

== Performances ==
- Right You Are - Nov 25, 2003 - Dec 21, 2003 (held at Michael Schimmel Center for the Arts)
- The Persians - May 22, 2003 - Jun 22, 2003; directed by Ethan McSweeny (held at Michael Schimmel Center for the Arts)
- The Resistible Rise of Arturo Ui - Oct 2002 (held at Michael Schimmel Center for the Arts)
- Judgment at Nuremberg - Feb 15, 2001 - May 13, 2001 (45 previews, 56 performances held at Longacre Theatre)
- Night Must Fall - Feb 2, 1999 - Jun 27, 1999 (40 previews, 119 performances held at Lyceum Theatre, 3/8-4/11/1999; Helen Hayes Theatre, 4/19-6/27/1999)
- The Sunshine Boys - Nov 29, 1997 - Jun 28, 1998 (12 previews, 230 performances held at Lyceum Theatre)
- The Gin Game - Apr 4, 1997 - Aug 31, 1997 (19 previews, 145 performances held at Lyceum Theatre)
- Inherit the Wind - Feb 27, 1996 - May 12, 1996 (42 previews, 45 performances held at Royale Theatre)
- The School for Scandal - Nov 14, 1995 - Dec 17, 1995 (7 previews, 33 performances held at Lyceum Theatre)
- Gentlemen Prefer Blondes - Mar 28, 1995 - Apr 30, 1995 (16 previews, 24 performances held at Lyceum Theatre)
- The Flowering Peach - Mar 8, 1994 - Apr 24, 1994 (14 previews, 41 performances held at Lyceum Theatre)
- The Government Inspector - Dec 23, 1993 - Feb 6, 1994 (16 previews, 37 performances held at Lyceum Theatre)
- Timon of Athens - Oct 19, 1993 - Dec 5, 1993 (16 previews, 39 performances held at Lyceum Theatre)
- Three Men on a Horse - Mar 23, 1993 - May 16, 1993 (24 previews, 39 performances held at Lyceum Theatre)
- Saint Joan - Jan 19, 1993 - Mar 14, 1993 (15 previews, 48 performances held at Lyceum Theatre)
- The Seagull - Nov 17, 1992 - Jan 10, 1993 (15 previews, 49 performances held at Lyceum Theatre)
- The Master Builder - Mar 11, 1992 - Apr 26, 1992 (11 previews, 44 performances held at Belasco Theatre)
- A Little Hotel on the Side - Jan 14, 1992 - Mar 1, 1992 (15 previews, 41 performances held at Belasco Theatre)
- The Crucible - Nov 19, 1991 - Jan 5, 1992 (23 previews, 31 performances held at Belasco Theatre)
- The Odd Couple - Jun 23, 1991 (1 benefit performance held at Belasco Theatre)

== Awards ==
- 1997 Tony Award Best Revival of a Play - The Gin Game [nominee]
- 1997 Tony Award Best Director of Play - Charles Nelson Reilly, The Gin Game [nominee]
- 1997 Tony Award Best Actress of Play - Julie Harris, The Gin Game [nominee]
- 1997 Drama Desk Award Outstanding Revival of a Play - The Gin Game [nominee]
- 1997 Outer Critics Circle Award Best Actor of Play - George C. Scott, Inherit the Wind
- 1996 Outer Critics Circle Award Best Revival of a Play - Inherit the Wind
- 1996 Tony Award Best Revival of a Play - Inherit the Wind [nominee]
- 1996 Tony Award Best Actor in a Play - George C. Scott, Inherit the Wind
- 1994 Tony Award Best Revival of a Play - Timon of Athens [nominee]
- 1994 Drama Desk Award Outstanding Play Revival - Timon of Athens [nominee]
- 1993 Tony Award Best Revival of a Play - Saint Joan [nominee]
