= André Bishop =

American theatrical producer

André Bishop (born November 9, 1948) is an American theatrical producer, and artistic director and producing artistic director, of Lincoln Center Theater. He has produced over 80 Broadway plays and musicals and has won numerous Tony Awards.

== Life and career ==
Bishop was born André Bishop Smolianinoff, and changed his name to Andre S. Bishop after the death of his father. He graduated from Harvard University in 1970 where he was a pupil of dramatist Robert Chapman. He was the artistic director of Playwrights Horizons from 1981 to 1991. He is a member of the American Academy of Arts and Sciences and an inductee in the American Theater Hall of Fame.

== Awards ==
=== Tony Awards ===
- 1994 Best Revival of a Musical: Carousel – Producer
- 1995 Best Revival of a Play: The Heiress – Producer
- 1996 Best Revival of Play: A Delicate Balance – Producer
- 2000 Best Musical: Contact – Producer
- 2004 Best Revival of a Play: Henry IV – Producer
- 2006 Best Revival of a Play: Awake and Sing! – Producer
- 2007 Best Play: The Coast of Utopia – Producer
- 2008 Best Revival of a Musical: Rodgers & Hammerstein's South Pacific – Producer
- 2011 Best Play: War Horse – Producer
- 2015 Best Revival of a Musical: The King and I – Producer
- 2017 Best Play: Oslo – Producer

=== American Theater Hall of Fame ===
- Inducted in 2012
