= Theodore Mann =

American theatre producer and director

Theodore Mann, birth name Goldman, (May 13, 1924 – February 24, 2012) was an American theatre producer and director and the Artistic Director of the Circle in the Square Theatre School.

Mann co-founded Circle in the Square Theatre, widely regarded as the birth of the off-Broadway theatre movement with José Quintero in 1951. Ten years later, he established the Circle in the Square Theatre School to provide training for aspiring actors. It presently offers a two-year program including courses in scene study, text analysis, speech, dance, and singing technique.

== Career ==
Mann produced and/or directed more than two hundred productions starring actors including Al Pacino, Dustin Hoffman, Jason Robards, Geraldine Page, Colleen Dewhurst, James Earl Jones, Kevin Kline, Maureen Stapleton, Rip Torn, George C. Scott, and Jane Alexander. In addition to his Broadway and off-Broadway credits, he directed The Turn of the Screw for the New York City Opera, La Boheme for the Juilliard School, and The Night of the Iguana for Moscow's Maly Theater.

Mann received a Tony Award, as producer of the 1957 revival of Long Day's Journey Into Night. He was nominated for twelve additional Tonys and seven Drama Desk Awards.

In April 1964 Mann joined Mark Lane's Citizens Committee of Inquiry. In 1976, the Circle in the Square Theatre received a Special Tony Award acknowledging twenty-five continuous years of quality productions.

Mann received the 1999 Tao House Award from the Eugene O'Neill Foundation for his distinguished career in theatre and for his dedication to the works of O'Neill.

In November 2007, Applause Books published Mann's Memoir, Journeys In The Night: Creating a New American Theatre with Circle In The Square, which tells the story of his remarkable partnership with Jose Quintero and the rise of the Circle in the Square Theatre from Off-Broadway to Broadway.

In 1953, he married soprano Patricia Brooks. They had a son Andrew in 1958 and another Jonathan in 1961. She died in 1993.

In 2009, Ted Mann was inducted into the American Theater Hall of Fame.

Mann died February 24, 2012, following a brief illness. He was 87.

== Notable Broadway productions ==
- 1956: Long Day's Journey Into Night (Producer)
- 1965: The Royal Hunt of the Sun (Producer)
- 1972: Mourning Becomes Electra (Producer, Director)
- 1973: Uncle Vanya (Producer)
- 1974: The National Health (Producer)
- 1975: The Glass Menagerie (Producer, Director)
- 1976: Pal Joey (Producer, Director)
- 1984: Awake and Sing! (Producer, Director)
- 1988: The Night of the Iguana (Producer, Director)
- 1992: Anna Karenina (Producer, Director)
- 1989: Sweeney Todd (Producer)
- 1995: The Rose Tattoo (Producer)
- 1996: Tartuffe (Producer)

== Notable off-Broadway productions ==
- 1952: Summer and Smoke (Producer)
- 1956: The Iceman Cometh (Producer)
- 1962: Under Milk Wood (Producer)
- 1963: Desire Under the Elms (Producer)
- 1968: A Moon for the Misbegotten (Director)
