= Richard Liebowitz =

American photographer and disbarred lawyer

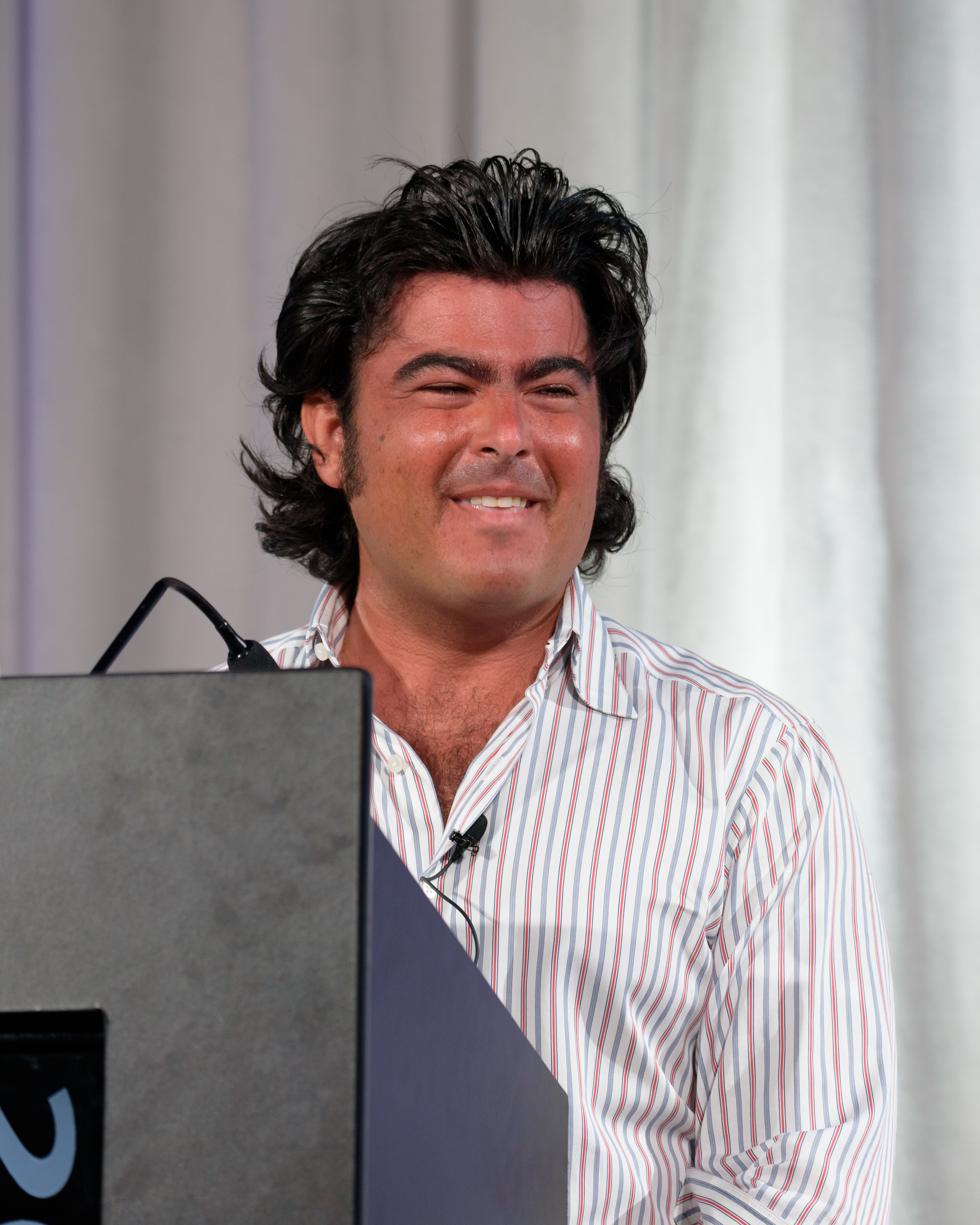
- Liebowitz in 2019
- Education: University of Pennsylvania Hofstra University Law School (JD)
- Occupation: Lawyer
- Employer(s): Liebowitz Law Firm, PLLC
- Known for: Copyright attorney

Richard Liebowitz is an American entrepreneur, former lawyer specializing in copyright law, and photographer. As a lawyer, he was known for filing a high number of lawsuits against media organizations on behalf of photographers who asserted that their images had been used without permission.

== Life and career ==
A Long Island native, he graduated from the University of Pennsylvania. Liebowitz worked as an intern for veteran New York press photographer Bruce Cotler. His experience with Cotler, about which he wrote a book, and as a member of the New York Press Photographers Association motivated Liebowitz to pursue a career in copyright law.

After graduating from Hofstra University Law School, he was admitted to the New York bar in 2015, established his practice in New York and filed his first lawsuit in January 2016. He works on a contingency basis and has filed, on average, about five lawsuits per week. Contrary to other copyright lawyers, his practice is to immediately file suit rather than pursue a settlement, and to claim statutory damages far in excess of the images' ordinary licensing prices.

== Assessments ==
Liebowitz's approach to copyright litigation earned him a reputation as "the scourge of the media industry (...) and the salvation of the underpaid photographer", according to Slate. Media organizations and their lawyers have asserted that Liebowitz is abusing the legal system by overloading the courts with dubious cases in which he attempts to leverage mistakes by overworked editorial staff into financial windfalls.

For his part, Liebowitz has argued that copyright law is the only tool that photographers have to protect their rights and livelihood in a digital media environment in which images are often reused without regard to proper licensing; however, in one case, a client was forced to repay $120,000 in legal bills to several media outlets Liebowitz sued on his behalf.

== Disciplinary issues ==
Courts have repeatedly disapproved of Liebowitz's approach to legal practice and imposed sanctions on him or his clients. In one case, Judge Lewis A. Kaplan ordered Liebowitz's client to pay the defendant's legal fees for what the judge considered "frivolous litigation", and in another, Judge Denise Cote determined that Liebowitz was a "copyright troll", fined him and imposed ethics classes on him.

In 2019 a judge observed that "there is a growing body of law in this District" – the Southern District of New York – "devoted to the question of whether and when to impose sanctions on Mr. Liebowitz". In September 2019, Liebowitz was held in contempt of court by Judge Cathy Seibel for lying about the date of his grandfather's death in an attempt to excuse his failure to attend court.

In June 2020 Judge Jesse Furman concluded in a 61-page opinion and order that Lebowitz "lied about his compliance with a court Order", "repeated that lie, over and over", "violated at least six of the Court's Orders", and wrote that "there may be no sanction short of disbarment that would stop Mr. Liebowitz from further misconduct." The judge ordered that Liebowitz pay $103,517.49 in sanctions, that Liebowitz give a copy of the opinion to all of his clients, and that Liebowitz file a copy of the opinion in all of his open cases. In June and July 2021, the Second Circuit affirmed the sanctions on appeal.

Furman also sent the opinion to the Grievance Committee for potential disbarment. On November 30, 2020, the Grievance Committee of the Southern District of New York suspended Liebowitz from the practice of law in the district, pending the outcome of his disciplinary charges.

On November 3, 2021, Liebowitz was immediately suspended by the New York Appellate Division, Second Department, pending further order of the Court.

Following a hearing, on March 13, 2024, Liebowitz was disbarred by the New York Appellate Division, Second Department.
