= David Binder =

American theatre producer

- Born: October 28, 1967 (age 58); Los Angeles, California, US
- Occupations: Theater producer, artistic director

David Binder (born October 28, 1967, in Los Angeles, California) is a Broadway, off-Broadway, and West End theater producer and served as artistic director of the Brooklyn Academy of Music from 2019-2024.

== Career ==
In 1998 Binder presented the off-Broadway play De La Guarda, and in 2007 produced Fuerzabruta, the show from the creators of De La Guarda.

Binder produced the first Broadway revival of Lorraine Hansberry's A Raisin in the Sun, starring Sean Combs, Audra McDonald, Phylicia Rashad and Sanaa Lathan. The 2004 production won two Tony Awards for Best Actress and Best Featured Actress in a Play. He is an Executive Producer of the ABC television movie based on the Broadway production.

In 2006 he produced The Public Sings: A 50th Anniversary Celebration for the Public Theater with Meryl Streep, Natalie Portman, Ben Stiller and Mike Nichols, among others.

In 2011, Binder produced Short Ride in a Fast Machine, IBM's Centennial Celebration at Lincoln Center.

In March 2012, Binder produced Kenneth Lonergan's This Is Our Youth at the Sydney Opera House starring Michael Cera and Kieran Culkin.

Binder taught at Princeton University where he was the Anschutz Distinguished Fellow in American Studies in 2012/2013.

Binder was guest artistic director of LIFT (London International Festival of Theatre) which took place in June 2018.

Binder produced Burn This in 2019, with stars Adam Driver and Keri Russell, the 2018 production of Network starring Bryan Cranston, and the 2014 productions of Hedwig and the Angry Inch starring Neil Patrick Harris and Of Mice and Men starring James Franco and Chris O'Dowd. Hedwig and the Angry Inch won four Tony Awards including Best Revival, and Of Mice and Men became the first Broadway show to be filmed by the National Theatre of Great Britain's NT Live and shown in cinemas around the world.

=== Awards ===
He is the recipient of the Robert Whitehead Award for Outstanding Achievement in Theatrical Producing, and has been honored by Performance Space 122.
