= Jerry Frankel =

American producer of plays and musicals (1930-2018)

- Born: August 1, 1930; Queens, New York, U.S.
- Died: November 17, 2018 (aged 88); Manhattan, New York, U.S.
- Education: University of Illinois
- Occupations: Musical theatre producer, thoroughbred breeder and owner
- Spouses: Sandra Light; Honu Stern
- Children: 1 son, 2 daughters

Jerry Frankel (August 1, 1930 – November 17, 2018) was an American Tony Award-winning producer of plays and musicals for Broadway theatre, the founder of Jerrell Inc. (Dallas), a leading US manufacturer of women's apparel, and a breeder/owner of Thoroughbred race horses, including Dayatthespa. He would sometimes use the titles of shows, names of actors and songs as eponyms for his horses, such as the mare named after Linda Eder, a star in his Broadway musical, Jekyll & Hyde, and another named after "This Is the Moment", a song in the same show.

== Early life and career ==
Frankel was born on August 1, 1930, in Queens, New York City. His father, Abraham, was a dress manufacturer. Frankel attended the University of Illinois, where he earned a bachelor's degree in journalism.

Frankel's business career began when he started working for his father's garment manufacturing business in New York. In 1964, he co-founded his own garment manufacturing company, Jerrell Inc., located in Dallas, Texas, with Seymour Thum, and became a leading US manufacturer of women's apparel. A few of Jerrell's popular labels include Selena and Salcedo which was sold at popular department store chains in the US, such as Macy's and J. C. Penney, and the Stonebridge label sold exclusively by Dillard's. Haggar Clothing acquired Jerrell in 1998.

== Broadway productions ==
Over time, Frankel's interests led him into the business of Broadway production, and in 1997, he co-produced his first Broadway show, Jekyll & Hyde, with Jeffrey Richards (producer). He went on to produce more than 50 shows over the next two decades, several of which won Tony Awards, including Death of a Salesman (1999), Glengarry Glen Ross (2005), Spring Awakening (2006), August: Osage County (2007), Hair (2009), La Cage aux Folles (2010), The Gershwins' Porgy and Bess (2011), Who's Afraid of Virginia Woolf? (2012) and All the Way (2014). His final production was Come from Away (2017).

== Thoroughbred racing ==
Thoroughbred racing was another of Frankel's passions, believed by some to stem from his love of gambling and willingness to take risks in business. His involvement with the sport as an owner/breeder began in 1974, with the bulk of his lifetime earnings recorded from 2000 forward under his given name, Gerald. Multiple graded stakes winning owner was his best racing class achieved with earnings of $1,907,088.00.

He and his brother, Ronald, were partners on several horses, including Dayatthespa, a filly they purchased by private treaty when she was a two-year-old in training. As a yearling, she sold for $50,000 at the 2010 Fasig-Tipton Preferred New York Bred Yearling Sale. She was sired by City Zip, trained by Chad Brown, and co-owned with Bradley Thoroughbreds and Steve Laymon. She won over $2,280,000, including the Yaddo Handicap at Saratoga Race Course in 2013 and 2014, the 2014 First Lady Stakes at Keeneland and 2014 Breeders' Cup Filly & Mare Turf with a 1 1/4 length victory.

Of the notable race horses Frankel bred, Joey Franco was the 2003 California-bred Horse of the year and winner of over $635,000 including the 2003 Triple Bend Invitational Handicap at Hollywood Park Racetrack and Breeders' Cup at Del Mar racetrack. Frankel named Joey Franco after the mispronunciation of his own name when people who didn't know him returned his calls, obviously having misunderstood the fast spoken messages he left for a callback.

Frankel sometimes named his horses using eponyms derived from titles of shows, or from the names of actors and songs. A few examples include a mare named after Linda Eder, the leading star in his Broadway musical Jekyll & Hyde, another he named after the song "This Is the Moment" from the same show, and one he named Osage County, after his play August: Osage County (2007).

== Personal life and death ==
Frankel resided in Dallas, Texas and Carlsbad, California. His first marriage to Sandra Light ended in divorce. His second wife, Honu Stern, died in 2008. He had a son and two daughters, and at the time of his death had a partner, Mary Casey.

Frankel died on November 17, 2018, in Manhattan at age 88.
