= Thoughts of a Colored Man =

2021 play by Keenan Scott II

- 2021 Broadway playbill
- Original language: English
- Written by: Keenan Scott II
- Characters: Happiness; Love; Lust; Passion; Depression; Wisdom; Anger
- Genre: Drama

Premiere
- Date: Septemnber 9, 2019
- Place: Syracuse Stage

Thoughts of a Colored Man is a play written by Keenan Scott II that opened on Broadway on October 13, 2021. It is Scott's Broadway debut, and the play is the first Broadway show that was written and directed by Black men (Steve Broadnax III) with a Black man in the lead role and lead produced by all Black artists.

== Plot ==
The show uses slam poetry, prose and songs to tell the story of Black life in America through the stories of seven multi generational men living in the same Brooklyn neighborhood.

== Production history ==
Scott began working on what is now Thoughts of a Colored Man fifteen years earlier when he was a Frostburg State University student. The show had an out-of-town tryout at Syracuse Stage in a co-production with Baltimore Center Stage in 2019. A December performance of the show was recorded for preservation in the New York Public Library Theatre on Film and Tape Archive.

On May 24, 2021, the play was announced to open on Broadway in the fall of 2021. Directed by Steve H. Broadnax III, the cast featured Bryan Terrell Clark as Happiness, Dyllón Burnside as Love, Da'Vinchi as Lust, Luke James as Passion, Forrest McClendon as Depression, Esau Pritchett as Wisdom and Tristan Mack Wilds as Anger. The play was slated to be one of seven plays by Black playwrights during the fall of that Broadway season.

The production received mixed reviews, with praise for the cast, but criticism for the writing. The New York Times criticizing the device of personifications as characters and that Black women were "entirely forgotten" from the play. Conversely, Deadline praised the production, calling it "a play of immense compassion and keen insight" and praised Scott's writing along with Broadnax's direction as "a marvel."

The show officially opened at the Golden Theatre on October 13, 2021, and ran through December 22, 2021, when it was forced to close due to the COVID-19 pandemic, even though the playwright stepped in to cover one performance. It was originally slated to end in March 2022. When it closed, the production had run for 12 previews and 77 performances.

== Awards and nominations ==
=== 2021 Broadway production ===
Year	Award	Category	Work	Result	Ref.
2022	Drama Desk Award	Outstanding Music in a Play	Te'La and Kamauu	Nominated	
2022	Drama Desk Award	Outstanding Projection Design	Sven Ortel	Nominated	
