= A Moon for the Misbegotten =

Play in four acts by Eugene O'Neill

Poster for the 2000 Broadway revival

A Moon for the Misbegotten is a play in four acts by Eugene O'Neill. The play is a sequel to O'Neill's Long Day's Journey into Night, with the Jim Tyrone character as an older version of Jamie Tyrone. He began drafting the play late in 1941, set it aside after a few months and returned to it a year later, completing the text in 1943 – his final work, as his failing health made it physically impossible for him to write. The play premiered on Broadway in 1957 and has had four Broadway revivals, plus a West End engagement.

== Plot ==
Set in a dilapidated Connecticut house in early September 1923, the play focuses on three characters: Josie, a domineering Irish woman with a quick tongue and a ruined reputation, her conniving father, tenant farmer and bullying widower Phil Hogan, and James Tyrone, Jr., Hogan's landlord and drinking companion, a cynical alcoholic haunted by the death of his mother.

The play begins with Mike, the last of Hogan's three sons, leaving the farm. As a joke during one of their drunken bouts, Tyrone threatens to sell his land to his hated neighbor, T. Steadman Harder, and evict Hogan. Hogan creates a scheme in which Josie will get Tyrone drunk, seduce him, and blackmail him. Josie and Tyrone court in the moonlight.

The scheme falls through when Josie finds out that Tyrone isn't going to sell the land to Harder after all. Tyrone tells Josie the story of how, after his mother died, he traveled back East on the train, and hired a blonde prostitute for $50 a night to overcome his grief.

The four-act play ends with James Tyrone leaving for New York to handle his mother's estate, apparently to die soon of complications from alcoholism.

== Autobiographical aspects ==
As in Journey, the Tyrone character is based on Eugene O'Neill's older brother, Jamie O'Neill.

== Productions ==
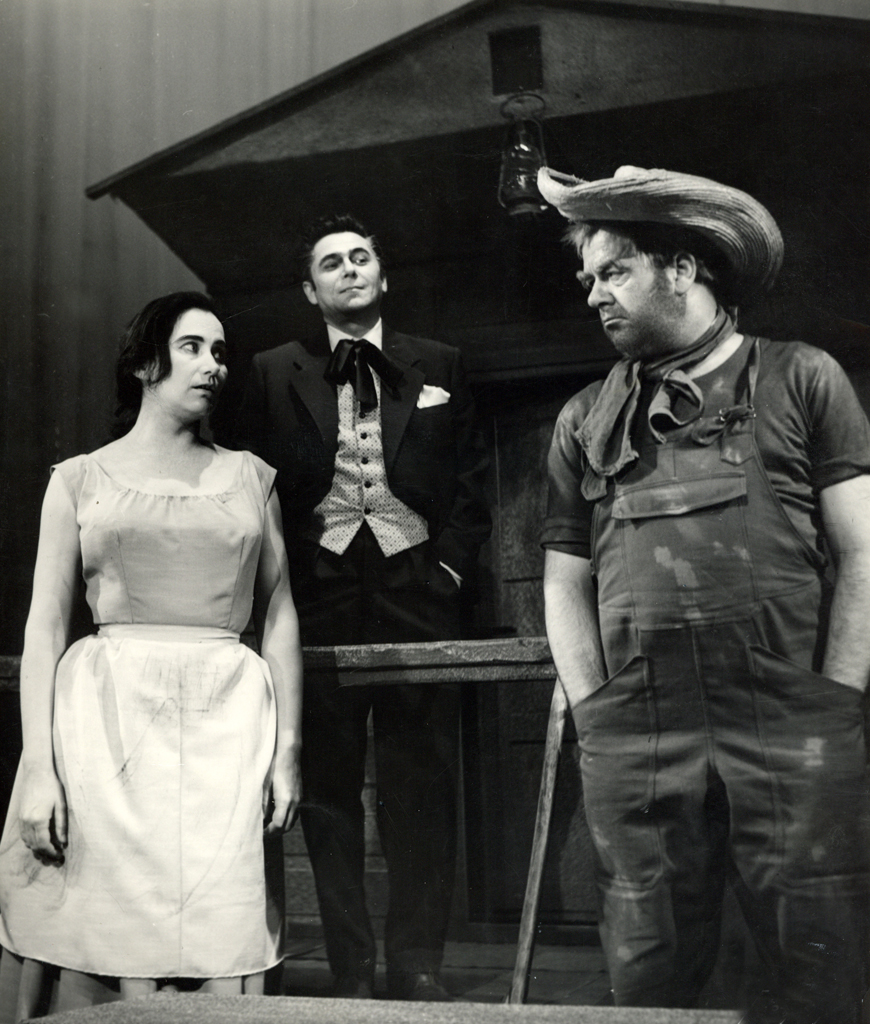
The play by the Maribor Slovene National Theatre in 1959

A Moon for the Misbegotten was produced by the Theatre Guild, which had produced many of O'Neill's, plays including Strange Interlude in 1928, The Iceman Cometh in 1946, and this play, the last. Because O'Neill was "unhappy with progress in rehearsals, ... [he] demanded out-of-town tryouts in a series of Midwestern cities." The play had its world premiere at the Hartman Theatre in Columbus, Ohio, in 1947.

The play has been produced five times on Broadway. The original production opened on May 2, 1957, at the now-demolished Bijou Theatre, where it ran for 68 performances. Directed by Carmen Capalbo, the cast included Cyril Cusack, Franchot Tone, and Wendy Hiller. Scenic design was by William Pitkin, Lighting Design by Lee Watson, and Costume Design by Ruth Morley. Wendy Hiller was nominated for the Tony Award, Actress in a Play.

The play was presented Off-Broadway by Circle in the Square Theatre, opening on June 12, 1968. Directed by Theodore Mann, the cast featured Salome Jens as Josie, Mitchell Ryan as James Tyrone, Jr., Garry Mitchell as T. Stedman Harder, W. B. Brydon as Phil and Jack Kehoe as Mike.

Its June 20-July 8, 1973 revival production at the Academy Playhouse in Lake Forest, Illinois went on to four previews with the first Broadway staging also directed by José Quintero opening on December 29, 1973, at the Morosco Theatre, where it ran for 313 performances. It also played at the Pasadena Playhouse in Pasadena, California, the State Theater of California. Both productions included Colleen Dewhurst who won a Tony Award, Jason Robards, and Ed Flanders a Tony Award recipient as well. The cast again resurrected their roles in a Quintero-directed production for television, broadcast by ABC on May 27, 1975. One of their affiliates in the state of Florida pre-empted the film controversially because it contained adult language. It garnered five Emmy Award nominations, including Outstanding Special—Drama or Comedy, with Ed Flanders also winning the award for Outstanding Single Performance by a Supporting Actor in a Comedy or Drama Special.

After nineteen previews, the second revival, directed by David Leveaux, opened on May 1, 1984, at the Cort Theatre, where it ran for 40 performances. The cast included Ian Bannen, Jerome Kilty, and Kate Nelligan. This production was nominated for the Tony Award for: Actress in a Play, Director of a Play, Lighting Design (Play or Musical) (Marc B. Weiss), and Revival (Play or Musical).

After fifteen previews, the third revival, directed by Daniel Sullivan, opened on March 19, 2000, at the Walter Kerr Theatre, where it ran for 120 performances. The cast included Gabriel Byrne, Roy Dotrice, and Cherry Jones.

A fourth revival, starring Kevin Spacey, began previews on March 29, 2007 and closed on June 10, 2007, at the Brooks Atkinson Theatre following a 112 performance run at the Old Vic Theatre in London 15 September 2006 to 23 December 2006, featuring Eve Best, Billy Carter, Colm Meaney, and Eugene O'Hare.

A London production at the Riverside Studios in 1983 starred Ian Bannen and Frances De La Tour.

Between October 13 and November 15, 2013, A Moon for the Misbegotten was produced for the first time in Low German under the title Lengen na Leev (Longing for Love) at the Ohnsorg Theater in Hamburg.

The play was produced in London at the Almeida Theatre from 18 June to 16 August 2025, directed by Rebecca Frecknall, with Michael Shannon and Ruth Wilson.

== Critical response ==
According to Michael Manheim, the 1973 revival, starring Jason Robards and Colleen Dewhurst, was "the most famous" of the productions, and "the performances of this production are usually seen as the defining interpretations of Tyrone and Josie."

The CurtainUp reviewer of the 2000 revival compared the 1973 production: "Dewhurst and Robards rescued O'Neill's failed play from neglect by digging beneath the facades these desperate people presented to the world -- he as a cynical carouser, she as the town tramp....The revival at the Morosco...proved O'Neill scholar Travis Bogard right when he declared Moon 'doomed to failure without superb acting' since no subsequent production ever recreated the magic of those 314 performances."

In his review of the 2007 production, Ben Brantley, writing in The New York Times mentioned the prior two revivals, noting "Both those versions emphasized the pathos of Moon, written in 1943 and first produced on Broadway in 1957. Inspired by the unhappy final chapters in the life of O’Neill’s ne’er-do-well older brother, James, the play is singular within its author’s body of work for its forgiving spirit."

== Awards and nominations ==
2007

- Best Actress in a Play, Eve Best (nominee)

2000

- Tony Award, Best Revival of a Play (nominee)
- Tony Award, Best Actor in Play, Byrne (nominee)
- Tony Award, Best Actress in a Play, Jones (nominee)
- Tony Award, Best Featured Actor in a Play, Dotrice (winner)

1984

- Tony Award, Best Actress in a Play, Nelligan (nominee)
- Tony Award, Best Lighting Design, Marc B. Weiss (nominee)
- Tony Award, Best Direction of a Play (nominee)
- Tony Award, Best Reproduction (nominee)

1973
Academy Playhouse, Lake Forest, Illinois, Producers Marshall Migatz and William T. Gardner
1974

- Tony Award, Best Actor in Play, Robards (nominee)
- Tony Award, Best Actress in a Play, Dewhurst (winner)
- Tony Award, Best Featured Actor in a Play, Flanders (winner)
- Tony Award, Best Lighting Design, Ben Edwards (nominee)
- Tony Award, Best Direction of a Play, Quintero (winner)
- Tony Award, Special Award, Elliot Martin (recipient)
- Tony Award, Special Award, Lester Osterman Productions (recipient)

1958

- Tony Award, Best Actress in a Play, Hiller (nominee)
