= Vivian Beaumont Allen =

American actress, philanthropist, and heiress(1885–1961)

- Born: March 22, 1885
- Died: October 10, 1962
- Occupations: actor, philanthropist

Vivian Beaumont Allen (March 22, 1885 – October 10, 1962), also known simply as Vivian Beaumont, was an American actress, philanthropist, and heiress.

A patron of Broadway theater in New York City, she funded the construction of the namesake Vivian Beaumont Theater, a Broadway-class theatre in the Lincoln Center for the Performing Arts complex, located on the Upper West Side; it was completed after her death. She was also the founder of the Vivian Beaumont Society, a charitable organization.

== Early life and education ==
Allen's father was a founder of now-defunct The May Department Stores Company.

== Philanthropy ==
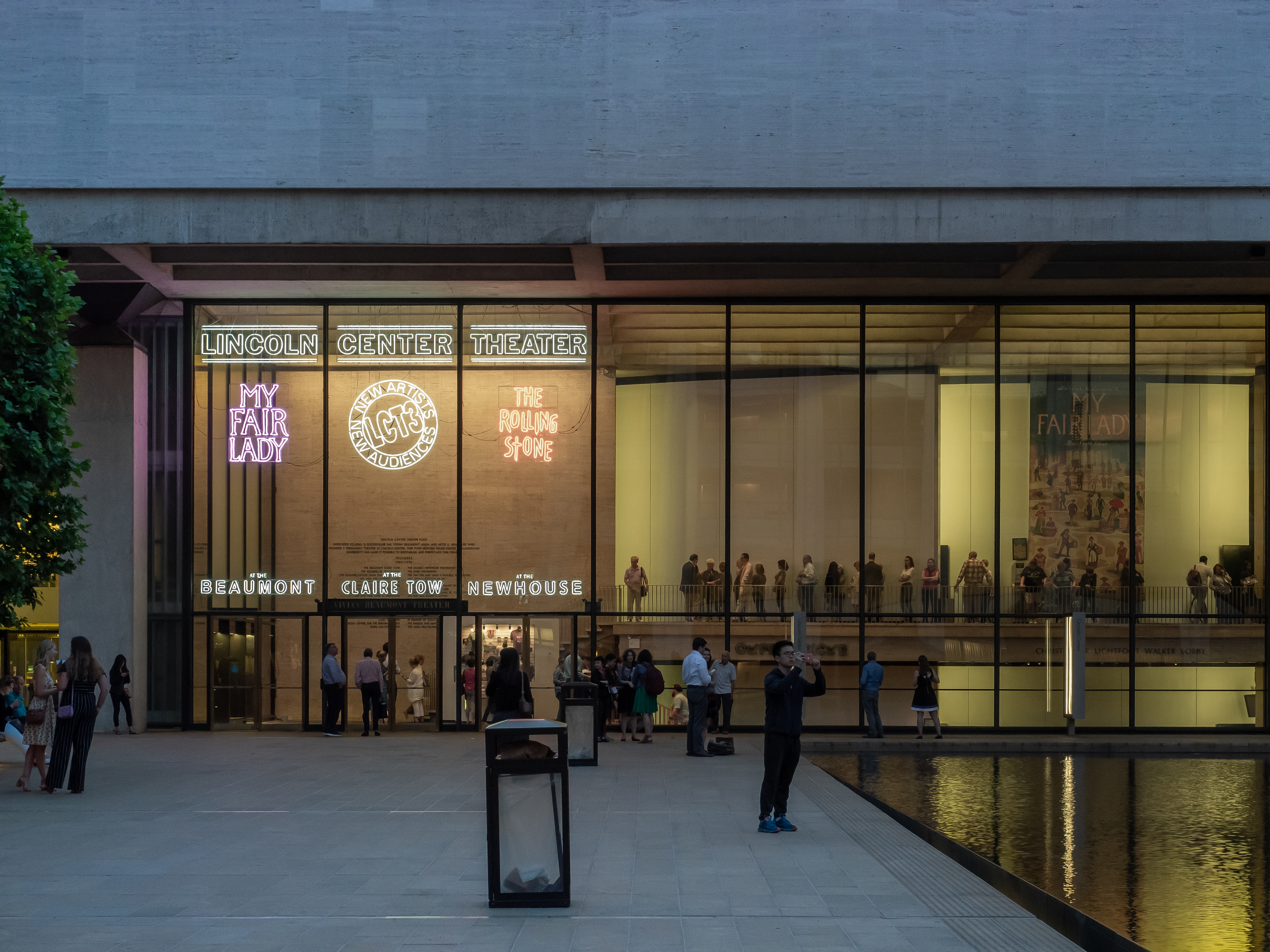
Vivian Beaumont Theatre in New York City (2019)

The Vivian Beaumont Theater, which is a part of Lincoln Center in New York City, New York, opened to the public on October 21, 1965. Over the years, it has gone through many different managements, became one of the largest not-for-profit theaters, and holds many plays and musicals. It was named in her honor due to her many charitable works.

Her society, the Vivian Beaumont Society, still encouraged others to be involved in the theater as of 2021

== Death and burial ==
Allen diedin 1962, at age seventy-seven, and was interred at the Woodlawn Cemetery in the Bronx.
