= Home movie =

Film or video recording family activities

Home movie made at the 1939 Worlds Fair in New York.

A home movie is a short amateur film or video typically made just to preserve a visual record of family activities, a vacation, or a special event, and intended for viewing at home by family and friends. Originally, home movies were made on photographic film in formats that usually limited the movie-maker to about three minutes per roll of costly camera film. The vast majority of amateur film formats lacked audio, shooting silent film.

The 1980s saw the advent of consumer camcorders that could record an hour or two of video on one relatively inexpensive videocassette which also had audio and did not need to be developed the way film did. This was followed by digital video cameras that recorded to flash memory, and most recently smartphones with video recording capability, made the creation of home movies easier and much more affordable to the average person.

The technological boundaries between home-movie-making and professional movie-making are becoming increasingly blurred as prosumer equipment often offers features previously only available on professional equipment.

In recent years, clips from home movies have been available to wider audiences through television series such as Kato-chan Ken-chan Gokigen TV (1986 debut) in Japan, America's Funniest Home Videos (1989 debut) in the United States, You've Been Framed! (1990 debut) in Britain, Video Gag (1990 debut) in France, and online video sharing sites such as YouTube (founded 2005), that of users who want to share their home movies as user-generated content. The popularity of the Internet, and wider availability of high-speed connections has provided new ways of sharing home movies, such as video blogs (vlogs) and video podcasts.

== History ==
The development of home movie-making has depended critically on the availability of equipment and media formats (film stock, video tape, etc.) at prices affordable to consumers. The introduction of film formats suitable for amateur hobbyists began early in the history of cinematography.

Amateur film equipment became standardized in the 1920s and 30s with the 9.5 mm, 16 mm, and 8 mm formats. By the late 1950s, home movies became cheaper to make, becoming available to the middle class. In the mid-1960s, Super 8's ease of use led to home movies being even more popular.

=== 17.5 mm format ===
The 17.5 mm "Birtac" format was patented by Birt Acres in 1898. This format split the standard 35 mm film into two strips half as wide and could be loaded into the camera in daylight. Since the film frames were also half the height of 35 mm frames, the Birtac format used only 25% of the amount of film stock used by 35 mm. The camera doubled as a printer and projector, so equipment costs were also reduced.

=== 9.5 mm format ===
In 1922, the French firm Pathé Frères introduced a new film format 9.5 mm wide which put the sprocket holes between the frames instead of along the sides of the film, allowing the images to occupy nearly the entire width. The resulting frames were nearly as large and clear as with the slightly later 16 mm format, which devoted much of its width to the stabilizing perforations. Used both for making home movies and for showing shortened "cinema-at-home" versions of professionally made feature films, it enjoyed popularity for several decades in Europe, including the UK, but was virtually unknown in the US.

=== Safety film and the 16 mm format ===
Of importance in making motion picture film practical for home use was the manufacturing option of safety film in the 1920s. The nitrate film used by professionals required caution in handling and projection because it is highly flammable. Nitrate film badly stored has been known to spontaneously combust.

The 16 mm format, which used only safety film, was introduced by Eastman Kodak in 1923 and became a standard in the non-professional market. Although 16 mm had the advantage that users were not tied to one equipment manufacturer, and there were obvious cost advantages compared to standard 35 mm, the advent of an even smaller and cheaper format ultimately relegated 16 mm to professional users, particularly in the educational market.

=== 8 mm film format and color ===
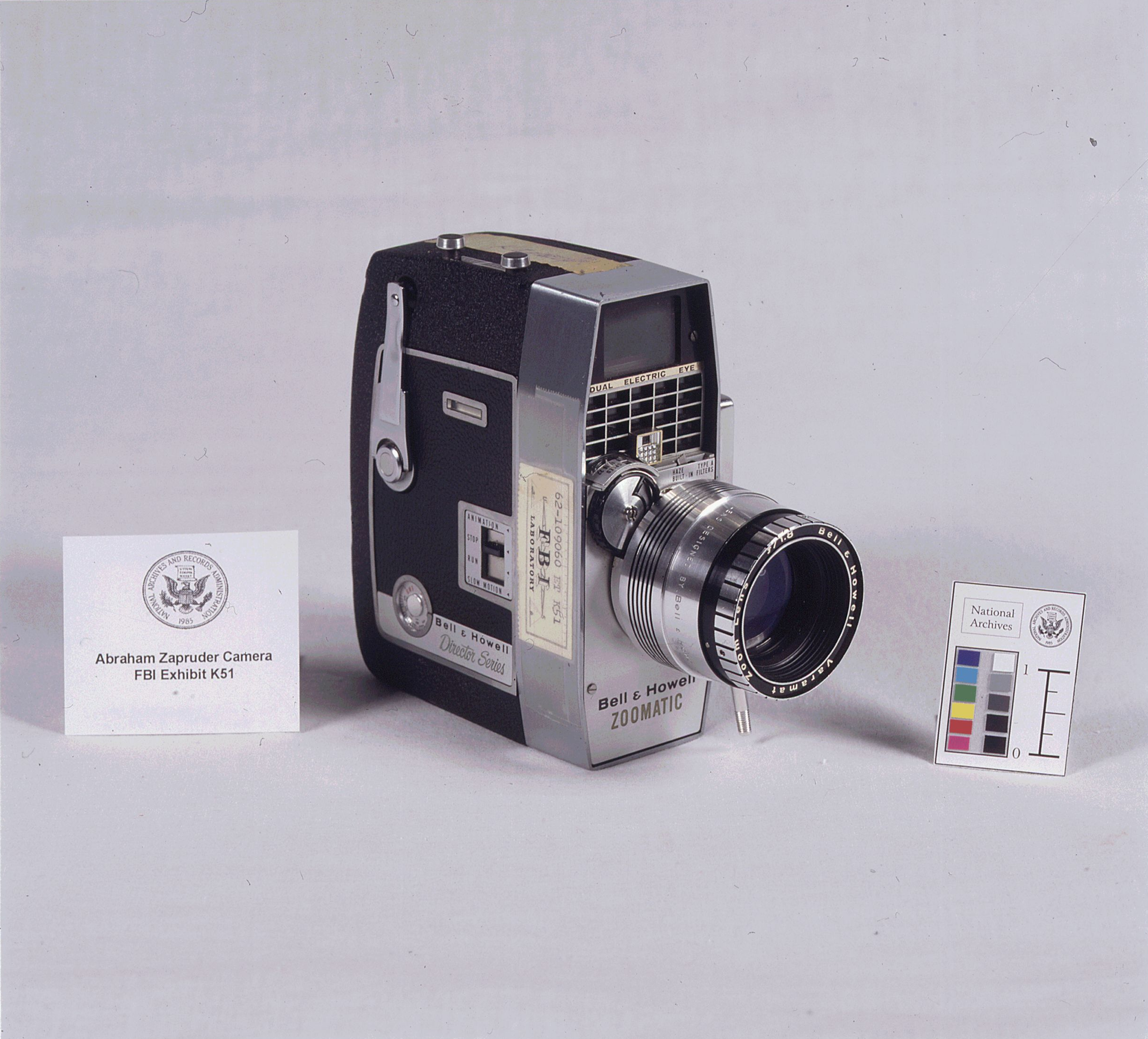
Bell & Howell Zoomatic camera used by Abraham Zapruder that recorded the assassination of John F. Kennedy.

In 1932, Kodak introduced another new format, 8 mm, now called "Standard 8" or "Regular 8", which put four frames into the area occupied by one standard 16 mm frame. The film usually came in 16 mm wide "Double 8" form, which ran through the camera in two passes (one in each direction) and was slit in half after processing. The "Straight 8" variant came already cut to 8 mm width. In either case, the amount of film stock used per frame was again reduced by 75%. This finally brought home movies within the reach of the average family. The smaller format also made possible smaller and more portable cameras and projectors.

The introduction of Kodachrome color reversal film for 16 mm in 1935, and for 8 mm in 1936, facilitated home color cinematography. The availability of reversal film, both black-and-white and Kodachrome, was very important to the economics of home movie-making because it avoided the expense of separate negatives and positive prints.

=== Super 8 and Single-8 film formats ===
The original 8 mm format was largely superseded within a few years of Kodak's 1965 introduction of Super 8 film. The Super 8 format used the same film width as standard 8 mm, but the perforations were smaller, making room for larger frames that yielded a clearer image. In addition, Super 8 film came in cartridges for easier loading into the camera. High-end Super 8 also could be purchased with a magnetic audio track, allowing for synchronized sound home movies. Single-8, a competing product from Fujifilm, was also introduced in 1965. It used the same new format as Super 8 but on a thinner polyester base and in a different type of camera cartridge.

=== Home video-making ===
The introduction of the Beta VCR in 1975 and VHS in 1976 heralded a revolution in the making of home movies. Videocassettes were extremely inexpensive compared to film and they could even be erased. This had the effect of greatly increasing the hours of footage of most family video libraries. It took a few years before consumer video cameras and portable VCRs were introduced, and later combined to create camcorders, but by that time, many consumers already had the playback equipment in their homes.

== Omnipresence and controversy ==
Portability and small size of digital home movie equipment, such as smartphones, has led to the banning of such devices from various places, due to privacy and security concerns.

Pornographic movies of celebrities have been rumoured to exist for many years, but the ease of creating home movies on video has resulted in several celebrity sex tapes becoming available to the public, often without the permission of participants. The honeymoon video of Pamela Anderson and Tommy Lee from 1998 was the first highly publicized example.

Portability of digital equipment helps fuel other controversies as well, such as the incident on November 17, 2006, in which comedian Michael Richards got into a racist war of words with an audience member during his comedy club act. Large parts of the incident were captured on the camera phone of another audience member and broadcast widely.

Home movies have played important roles in controversial criminal investigations. The prime example is the Zapruder film of the 1963 assassination of U.S. President John F. Kennedy, accidentally captured on Kodachrome film with an 8 mm home movie camera. The film became crucial evidence for the Warren Commission, which investigated the assassination. At first, only black-and-white enlargements of individual film frames were published, and the most gruesome frame was withheld. The public did not actually see the images in motion for many years. The first showing on network television occurred in 1975.

== See also ==
- Amateur film
- Cinematography
- Event videography
- Slide show
- Underwater videography
- Videography
- Video production
- Wedding videography
- Amateur pornography
- Prelinger Archives
