= Marryoke =

Marryoke is a wedding (or event) music video that is filmed during the day with the Bride & Groom and their guests. The footage is edited together to give the illusion that participants are singing the song themselves. Such a video clip is a documentation and performance of a song, that traditionally is produced at a wedding by a wedding videographer.

== Description ==
Marryoke is a niche product within the wedding industry which involves participants miming and performing a song of their choice. The footage is usually shot on the wedding day although it is not an activity exclusive to weddings. Once filmed, the footage is edited together so that it appears as if the participants are performing the song themselves. The phrase Marryoke is a play on the word karaoke due to their similarities; however a marryoke involves no actual singing from the participants being included in the final edit as the participants singing is lip synced to the original artist in editing. Marryoke has become popular as a form of wedding entertainment fun for guests.

== See also ==
- Wedding videography
- Videography
- Music video
