= Terry deRoy Gruber =

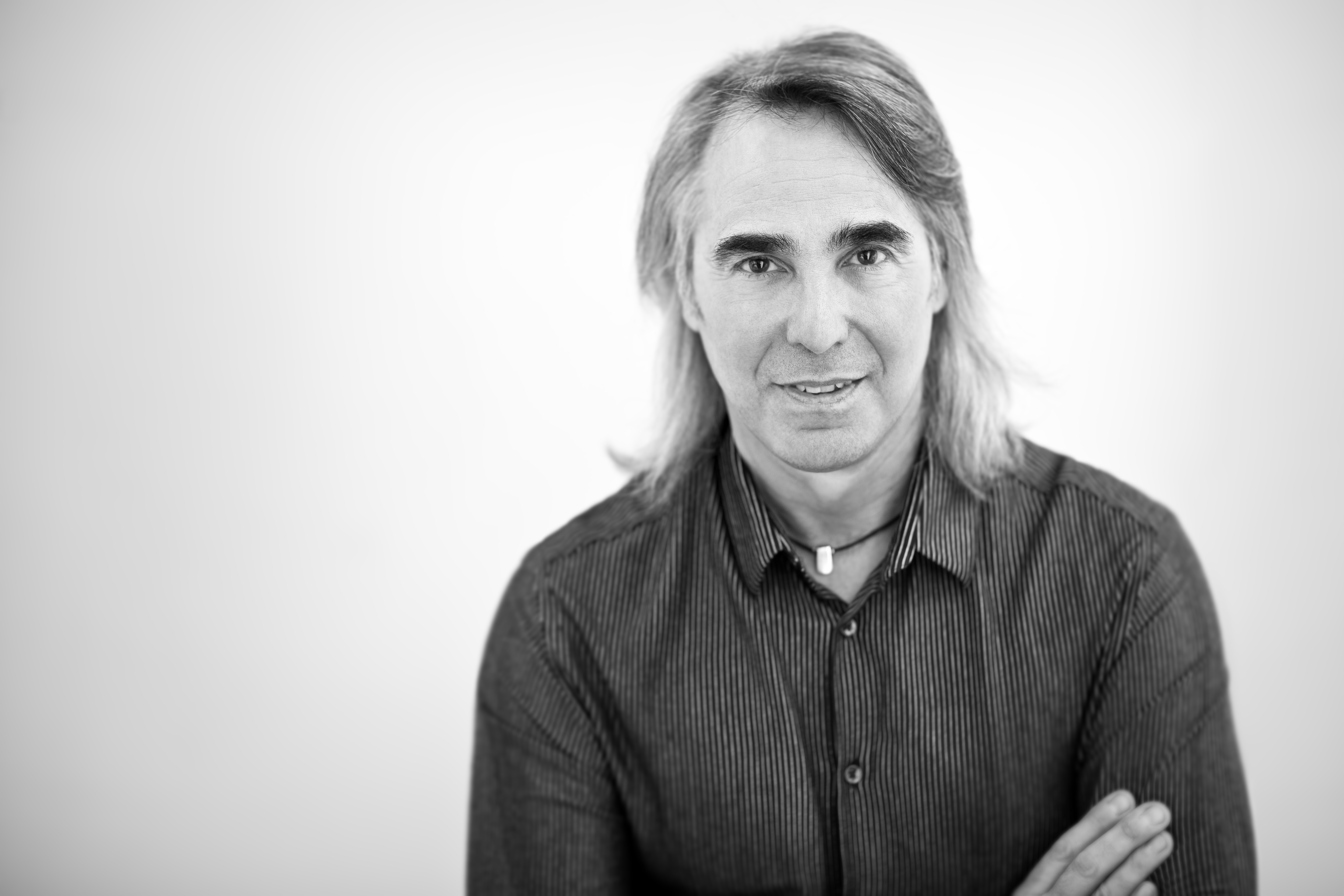
- Education: Vassar College
- Occupation: Photographer
- Notable work: Working Cats; Fat Cats; Cat High: The Yearbook
- Website: Gruber Photographers

Terry deRoy Gruber is an American photographer, author and filmmaker.

== Early life ==
Terry Gruber's mother, Aaronel deRoy Gruber, was a professional artist. He is also the brother of Jamie deRoy. Growing up in Pittsburgh Pa., Gruber attended Vassar College, during its second year of coeducation where he served as an editor-in-chief of The Vassarion, the college's yearbook. His position on the yearbook became national news when his freedom of speech was censored in 1975 by the college, before becoming reinstated.

== Photography career ==
Terry Gruber is the founder of Gruber Photographers Inc, where he is leader of a team of photographers, and works in fine arts photography. Gruber also works as a banquet photographer and wedding photographer, and has served as the photographer for the weddings of public figures such as Michael Douglas and Catherine Zeta-Jones; and Billy Joel and Katie Lee. The Bridal Council stated that Gruber was “one of the first reportage photographers to bring a fashionable, spirited eye to the … world of wedding photography”. Magazines that have published his photos include Vogue, Town & Country, and Vanity Fair. He has also commented on trends in wedding photography in articles for newspapers including the New York Times.

In 2022 his work was shown as a part of the "2022 Alternative Processes" exhibition at the Soho Gallery. He often works with traditional banquet photography cameras original to the 1920s, made by the company Folmer and Schwing. Specifically, he told PetaPixel in 2022 that "For an indoor shot, I have a 14-inch (~350mm) and 16-inch (~400mm) threaded lens with a Packard shutter with a lemon which is an air squeeze black bulb [for keeping the shutter open] ... For an outdoor shot with flashbulbs for fill light, I use a lens with a shutter — a 14-inch Goerz Dagor with a Copal shutter." His wedding photography has also been featured in the New York Times in their coverage of the wedding of rapper Remy Banks to Ashley Condina.

== Film career ==
As a filmmaker, his 1989 work Not Just Any Flower, made under thesis advisor Martin Scorsese while attending Columbia Film School, is in the permanent film collection of the MoMA in New York and won a Student Emmy Award for Best Comedy. In 1990 he worked as the still photographer on the film Men of Respect.

== Books ==
Books of photographs by Gruber include Working Cats (1979), Fat Cats (1981), and Cat High: The Yearbook (1984). Working Cats features cats who live in working environments, that were recruited from local owners for the book. The majority of the stores were along Amsterdam Avenue in Manhattan during the late 1970s. Ellen Freeman has said of the book that, “he photographed your standard-issue bodega cats, sure, but also: Hamlet, a white-coated cat working along-side the white-coated waiters in the dining room at the Algonquin Hotel; Brandy, perching on a ladder in a liquor store; Slugger, a “free agent” who ate hot dogs in the bowels of a baseball stadium; and John John, the Rodent Control Officer at the botanical gardens with his own bank account, among many others.” The book was later translated into both German and Japanese. Using his past experience with yearbooks Gruber created Cat High in 1984 as Paw Prints, the yearbook of a cat high school in Paw Paw, a spoof on yearbooks that had senior cats (and one dog) pose as graduates with mortarboards and other outfits. The title was re-released by Chronicle Books in 2015. His book Getting Married, 30 black and white postcards was published in 1996 by Merckendorf & Beamer.
