= Iko the Rainman =

American rapper

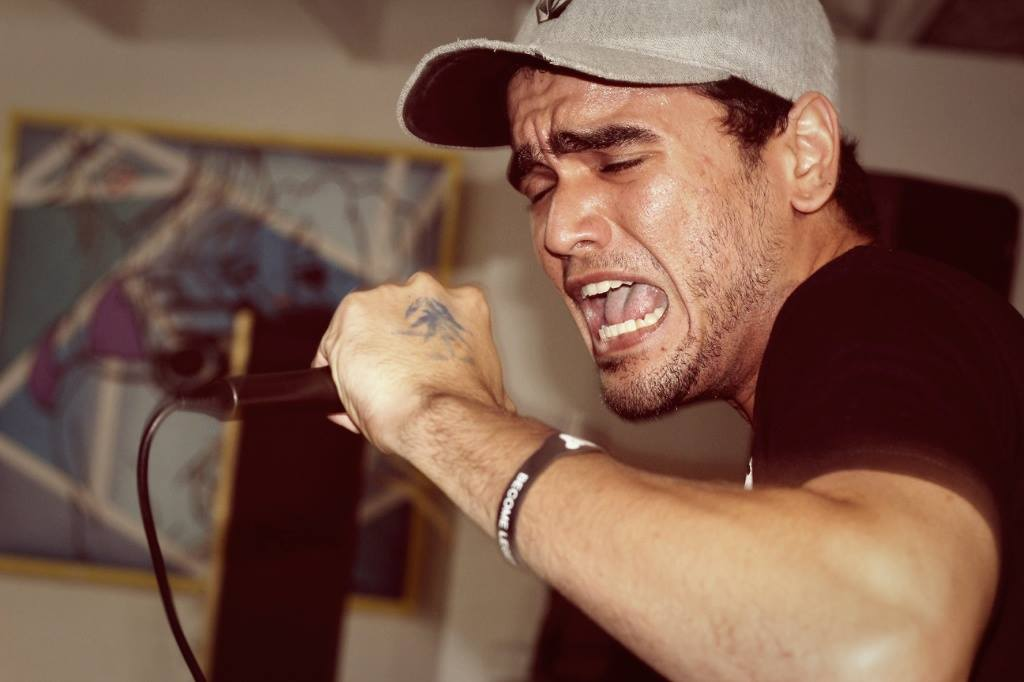
- Iko the Rainman performing in Miami, Florida

Background information
- Also known as: The Time Mage, Conan Edogawa Rap Detective
- Born: Jackson Paraiso; September 27, 1989 (age 36)
- Origin: Boca Raton, Florida, United States
- Genres: Hip-hop
- Years active: 2011–present
- Label: OPERATION 5:AM
- Website: OPERATION5AM.COM

Jackson Paraiso, also known as Iko the Rainman, is an American Brazilian hip-hop artist from Boca Raton, Florida.

== Career ==
Iko the Rainman is known for wearing too many hat's, including that of a writer, comedian, a videographer, and hip-hop artist. The Rainman's progressive style has been considered to be part of new age hip-hop music. Iko has been making music since 2011 in South Florida, many of his early aspirations were driven from Eminem, D12 and The Wu-Tang Clan. The Rainman is recognized for the way he incorporates his love for pop culture in his music, with subtle and not so subtle references to videogames, comics, movies and anime. He claims his aim is to capture the hearts of gamers and nerds that would usually shy away from rap music. Iko's first solo project "Basement Musik" was released in August 2012 and followed by "Attack Of The Rainman" which was an experimental horror project that was released on Halloween of 2013. Attack of the Rainman was considered to be a breath of fresh air in hip-hop with his unique perspective on storytelling and his take on hardcore hip-hop.

Operation 5:AM also referred to as "OP5TV" and "OP5", was created by Iko the Rainman, and represents his vision and symbol for friends his and entertainment.

== Discography ==
=== Iko the Rainman ===
Year	Title
2012	Basement Musik
2013	Attack of the Rainman
2016	Basement Musik Volume II "Tales From The Attic"

=== Operation 5:AM ===
Year	Title
2014	Regular Mixtape

=== Music videos ===
Year	Title
2012	Ben Affleck
2012	When I speak, the drum speaks
2013	The Devil
2013	Attack Of The Rainman
2014	She fell in love with a monster
2014	What I'm thinking about
2014	Wake Your Ass Up
2014	Riding with Obama
2014	James Franco
2015	The Suicide Squad
2015	Wolf VS Goblin
2015	Broly The Super Saiyan Time Bomb
2017	Flying Nymbus
2018	The Cold River You Left Me In
