= Zacuto (camera accessories) =

- Company type: Sales and rental of camera equipment
- Industry: Camera equipment and accessories, original content
- Founded: 2000; 26 years ago Chicago, Illinois, U.S.
- Products: Camera equipment and gear for filmmakers
- Website: zacuto.com

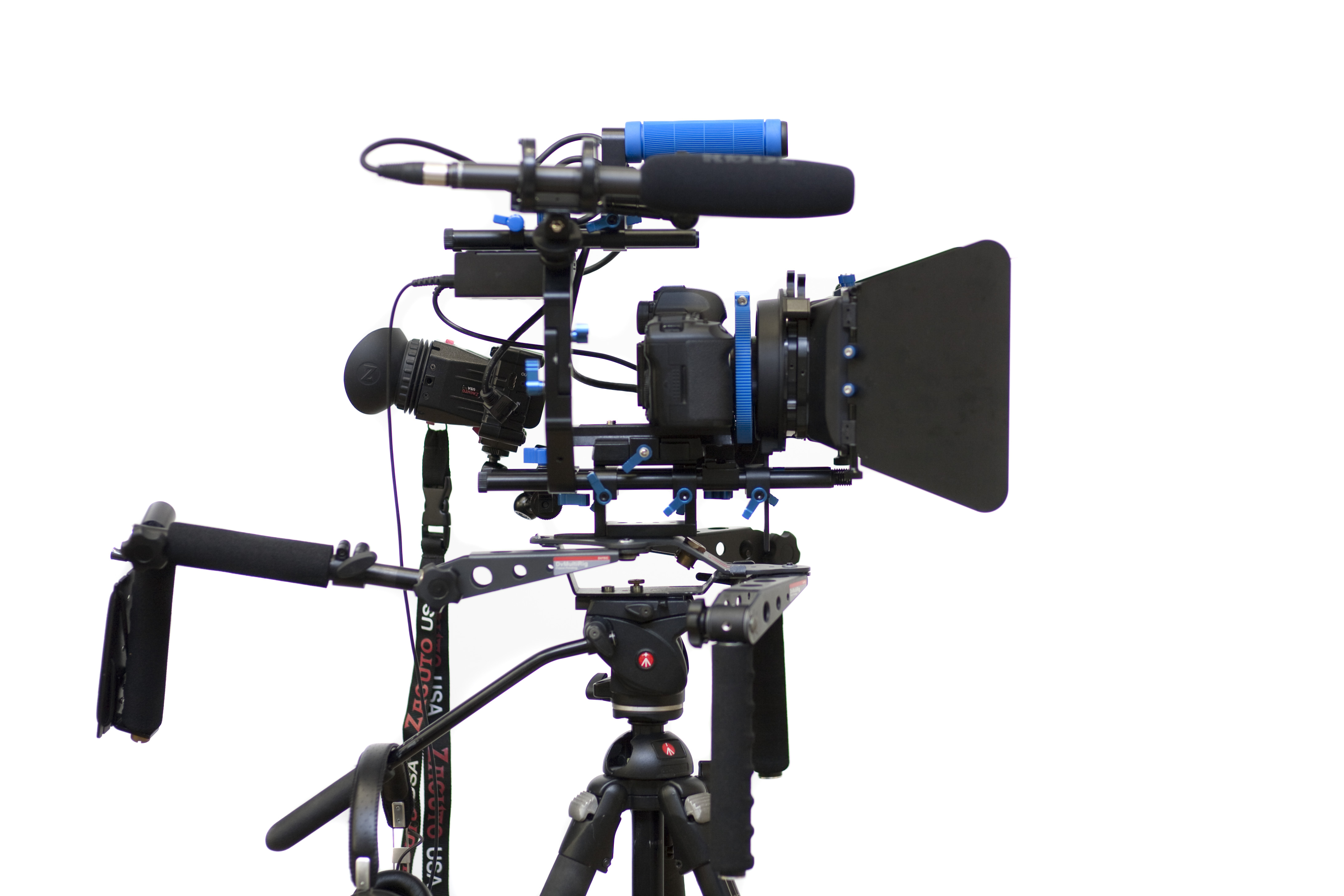
This rig uses a Zacuto viewfinder

Zacuto is an American company that creates, rents, and sells gear needed for filmmaking, videography, and photography. The company was founded in 2000. Located in the River North neighborhood of Chicago, Illinois, Zacuto manufactures its camera accessories in the United States.

== Product Developers ==
=== Jens Bogehegn ===
Bogehegn studied at Columbia College Chicago as a film major. Since 1985, Bogehegn has been a professional cameraman and has worked on numerous projects as a Steadicam owner/operator from 1988 through 1998. As a member of IATSE Local 600, Bogehegn's union credits include: The Untouchables (TV), Wayne's World 2 and U.S. Marshals. His independent credits include: The Oprah Winfrey Show, Watch It and Cosmic Voyage (IMAX). In 1988, Bogehegn began working with Steve Weiss as a director of photography and camera operator. Together, Bogehegn and Weiss worked on over 600 productions together in the corporate, commercial and political video industries before starting Zacuto in 2000.

=== Steve Weiss ===
Weiss has created and worked in many niche markets like; historical videos for Fortune 500 companies, video news releases, new product releases and interviews with CEOs and politicians. In 2000, Weiss formed Zacuto with Jens Bogehegn. Weiss and Bogehegn have also produced numerous webisodic films and series at Zacuto. Their web series The Great Camera Shootout 2010 was the first web series to win an Emmy Award for excellence in informational programming.

== Original programming ==
Zacuto produces original programming for entertaining and educating individuals in the video, film and photography industries. These videos include interviews with leaders of the film and photography industries on topics such as event videography, filmmaking, cinematography, directing, sound, lighting, documentary, DIY filmmaking, and more. Zacuto has received Emmy nominations and awards for its original programming (Midwest Chapter).
