= Zacuto (disambiguation) =

Abraham Zacuto (1452–c. 1515) was a Sephardi Jewish astronomer, astrologer, mathematician, rabbi and historian.

Zacuto may also refer to:

- Moses ben Mordecai Zacuto (c. 1625–1697), Kabbalist rabbi and poet
- Zacuto (camera accessories), a manufacturer of camera accessories for filmmaking and photography
