= Trash the dress =

Style of wedding photography

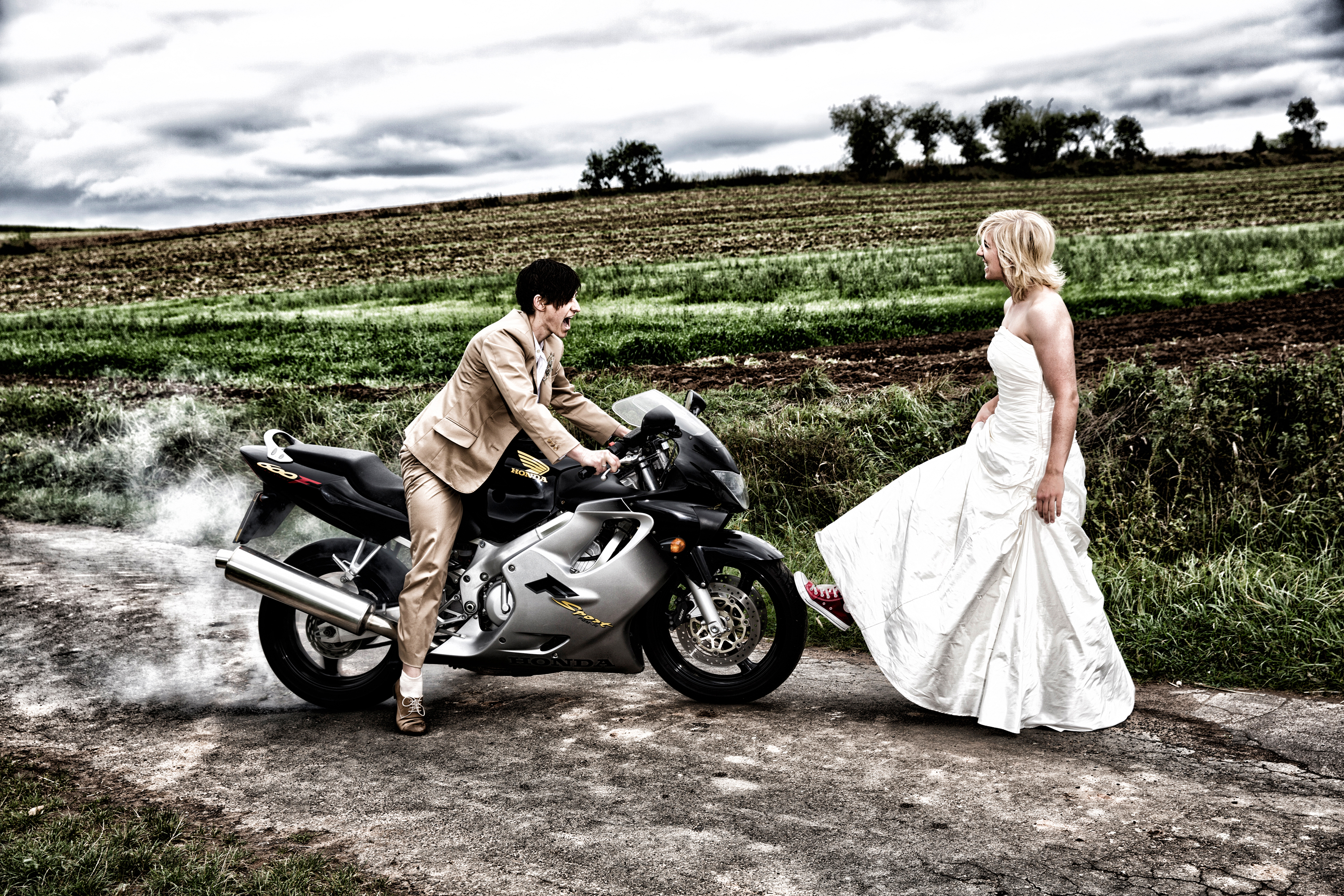
Example from a "trash the dress" shoot with a burnout on a motorcycle

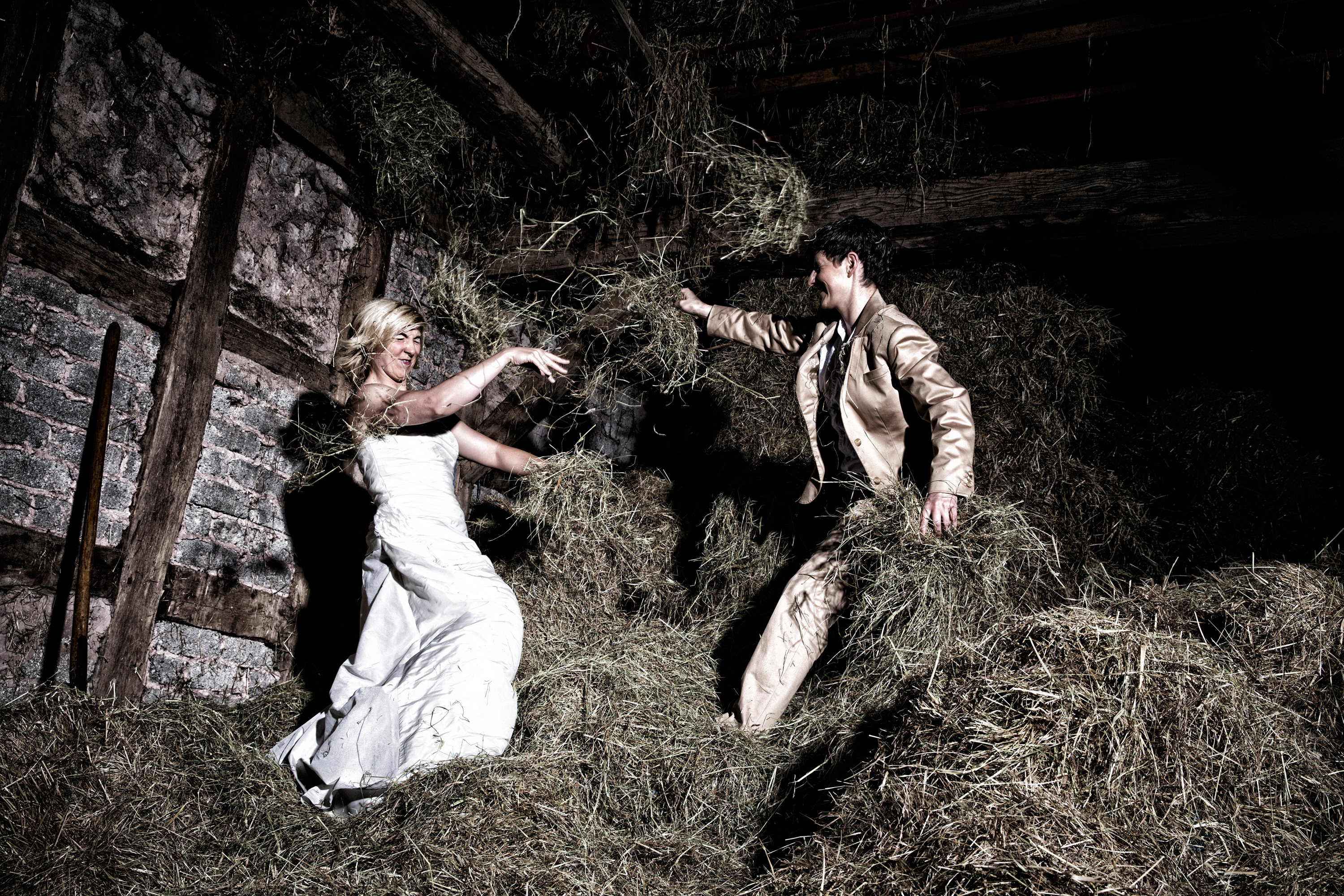
Example from a "trash the dress" shoot on a hayloft on a farm

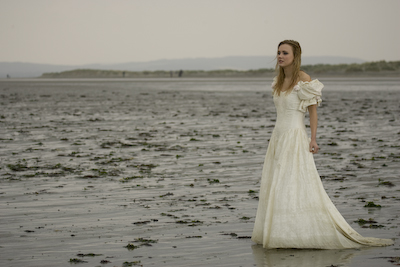
Example from a "trash the dress" shoot on a beach

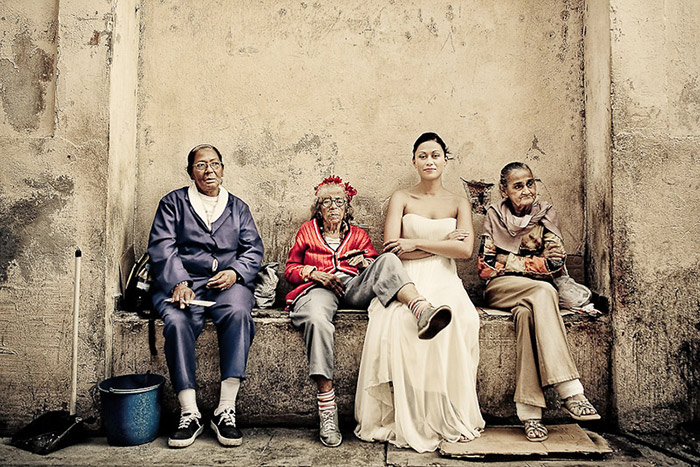
"Trash the dress" session in Havana, Cuba

"Trash the dress", also known as "fearless bridal" or "rock the frock" or the "running of the brides", is a style of wedding photography that contrasts elegant feminine clothing with an environment in which it is out of place creating a photo essay of contrast, beauty, and dramatic transformation. It is generally shot in the style of fashion or glamour photography. Such photography often takes place on a beach, but other locations often include lakes and streams, city streets, rooftops, water falls, muddy fields, tub-shower units, garbage dumps, fields, and abandoned buildings. The woman often wears a ball gown, prom dress or wedding dress, and may effectively "trash" the dress in the process by getting it wet, dirty, or, in extreme circumstances, tearing, cutting, or destroying the garment, or entire outfit. However, in the great majority of these photo sessions, the dress is not ruined and is easily cleaned.

The motivation for brides is symbolic representing the end of the wedding and her transformation of a bride to a wife rather than storing it forever never to be seen again. The session can include her husband, the bridal party or flower girl and can be romantic, elegant, comical, and even sensual.

Some sources claim that the trend was originally started in 2001 by Las Vegas wedding photographer John Michael Cooper. However, the idea of destroying a wedding dress has been used by the American film industry symbolically since at least October 1998 when Meg Cummings (played by Susan Ward) of the show Sunset Beach ran into the ocean in her wedding dress after her wedding was interrupted.

On 9 September 2009 (09-09-’09) in Scheveningen, the Netherlands, Dutch fine art photographer Melanie E. Rijkers initiated the biggest Trash The Dress event ever with over 150 brides participating the event to run into the North Sea wearing their own wedding dress. Some of the brides were married almost 60 years ago, the most recent bride got married only 6 days prior to the event. In 2010 she continued with an event with 100 brides on 10-10-’10 in Geertruidenberg. In 2011 she was invited to Adelaide, Australia and Running of the Brides in Niagara Falls, Canada and Breda, the Netherlands with tv-host Filemon Wesselink for a (smaller) reprise, with her final group event on 26 May 2012 - a random date.

On 26 August 2012, during a photo shoot at the Ouareau River in Rawdon, Quebec, Canada, Maria Pantazopoulos, a 30-year-old Montreal bride, drowned when the dress she was wearing dragged her downstream. The photographer, as well as others, tried to help but were unable to rescue her. Her body was later recovered by a scuba diver. Another woman risked drowning in 2015 when her wedding dress became waterlogged when she jumped into the ocean from a boat, pulling her under the surface.
