= Jamie deRoy =

American theatre producer

- deRoy in 2026

Background information
- Born: Jamie Gruber
- Origin: Pittsburgh, Pennsylvania
- Occupations: Performer; Host; Broadway and Off-Broadway Producer; Songwriter; Recording artist/Producer; Humanitarian
- Website: http://www.jamiederoy.com/

Jamie Gruber, better known by her stage name Jamie deRoy, is an American producer of Broadway plays, and a cabaret, stage, film and TV performer. She has co-produced 60 Broadway shows and 46 off-Broadway shows. deRoy has won eight Tony Awards for her theatre work and was one of the New York Friars Club's first eight female members.

== Early life and education ==
deRoy was born Jamie Gruber in Pittsburgh, Pennsylvania, where she grew up in the Squirrel Hill neighbourhood. Her mother Aaronel deRoy Gruber was a multimedia artist and her father Irving Gruber was the owner of American Forge and Manufacturing Co. Her brother is photographer and author Terry deRoy Gruber. She attended Linden Elementary School and graduated from Allderdice High School in 1963. deRoy then studied drama at Carnegie Mellon University. In 1964 she moved to New York City and enrolled in classes at the American Academy of Dramatic Arts.

== Career ==
Appearances on:

- Television shows "Alice," "Spiderman" and "Knight Rider"
- Films GoodFellas, Raging Bull, See No Evil, Hear No Evil and Married To It.
- Onstage, deRoy appeared with Rene Auberjonois in The Threepenny Opera, as well as in The Drunkard with musical direction by Barry Manilow.
- TV Movie music documentary "Backstage at The Sound of Music" - Jamie deRoy is host

=== Cabaret ===
deRoy's debut performance was at The Living Room in NY city in 1969. One of deRoy's earliest collaborations was with Barry Manilow.

deRoy opened for Joan Rivers in New York and L.A. She was in the first group of eight female members, including Liza Minnelli, Joan Rivers and Brooke Shields to be admitted to the Friars Club.

deRoy appeared at Caroline's at the Seaport, New York in 1988. In his New York Times review, Stephen Holden wrote "If Joan Rivers were a Manhattan-based cabaret artist, her act might well resemble that of Jamie deRoy, a singer and comedian who appeared at Caroline's at the Seaport on Monday".

deRoy hosts the variety show Jamie deRoy & friends, which airs every other Sunday at 7:30pm on the Manhattan Neighborhood Network. deRoy's show has been running for 29 years. Guest entertainers have included Christina Bianco, Mike Birbiglia, E. Clayton Cornelious, John Pizzarelli & Jessica Molaskey and Haley Swindal, Larry Gatlin, Tonya Pinkins, Lewis Cleale, Daisy Jopling, and Caroline Rhea, Melissa Errico, Barbara Fasano, Michael Garin, Daniel Rodriguez, and Michael Somerville, among others. deRoy interviews and gives a short bio of each one of her “friends”, then follows a performance. Jamie deRoy & friends variety shows are directed by Barry Kleinbort, and musical director Ron Abel. Jamie deRoy & friends have appeared at Birdland, The Metropolitan Room, Laurie Beechman, West Bank Cafe, and Feinsteins 54 Below. deRoy teamed with Larry Gatlin to present Larry Gatlin and The Gatlin Brothers for her Jamie deRoy & Friends series: Country Meets Broadway. In August 2019, deRoy brought Jamie deRoy & friends variety show to perform at the Milton Berle Room of the Monastery at the Friar's Club. Music and comedy guests included Jared Bradshaw, Steve Hayes, David Buskin, Sophie Buskin, Willy Falk, Angela LaGreca, and Charlotte Maltby.

== Recording career ==
Jamie deRoy produced nine CDs in the Jamie deRoy & friends series released on the Harbinger and PS Classics labels.

Jamie deRoy shows have benefitted charitable causes including the “Actors Fund: Jamie deRoy & friends Cabaret Initiative,” a program to assist people in the cabaret industry with help for medical needs and concerns.

In 2001, "Grateful" The Songs of John Bucchino by Jamie deRoy & Friends won the MAC statuette for Cabaret in the recording category for various artists.

Album

- Wish on the Moon

Record producer

- Heather Mac Rae - Songs For My Father (record producer)
- Mabel Mercer - Legendary Performers (executive producer)

Jamie deRoy & Friends albums

- Volume 1: The Child in Me
- Volume 2: The Child in Me
- Volume 3: 'Tis the Season
- Volume 4: Family
- Volume 5: Animal Tracks
- Volume 6: When I Grow Up
- Volume 7: The Real Thing
- If I Sing: The Songwriters Album

== Broadway co-producer ==
Jamie deRoy is a producer of Broadway shows as Jamie deRoy, Roxanne Seeman & Jamie deRoy, Jamie deRoy/Catherine Adler/Wendy Federman/Heni Koenigsberg, deRoy/Winkler/Batchelder, deRoy Kierstead, CatWenJam Productions, 42nd.club/The Yonnone Family/Island Productions, deRoy-Winkler, and as deRoy-Carr-Klausner.

deRoy co-produced the following stage productions:

- Frankie and Johnny
- Beetlejuice
- Tootsie
- To Kill A Mockingbird
- Network
- The New One
- The Waverly Gallery
- Ain't Too Proud
- The Ferryman
- The Lifespan of a Fact
- Pretty Woman: The Musical
- Three Tall Women
- Angels In America (Tony Award)
- Once On This Island (Tony Award)
- Meteor Shower
- Latin History for Morons
- The Band's Visit (Tony Award)
- 1984
- The Play That Goes Wrong Significant Other
- Sunday in the Park with George
- The Font Page
- An Act of God
- American Psycho
- Bright Star
- Fiddler on the Roof
- China Doll
- Sylvia
- The Gin Game
- The Heidi Chronicles
- The Realistic Joneses
- A Gentleman's Guide to Love & Murder (Tony Award)
- Vanya and Sonia and Masha and Spike (Tony Award)
- Rodgers + Hammerstein's Cinderella
- Nice Work If You Can Get It
- Peter and the Starcatcher
- The Motherfucker with the Hat
- Catch Me If You Can
- Enron
- The Addams Family
- Lend Me a Tenor
- All About Me
- A Behanding in Spokane
- The Miracle Worker
- Ragtime
- Finian's Rainbow
- Desire Under the Elms
- The Norman Conquests (Tony Award)
- Impressionism
- Blithe Spirit
- Speed-the-Plow
- All My Sons
- The Seagull
- Thurgood
- The Country Girl
- November
- Coram Boy
- Jay Johnson: The Two and Only, Chita Rivera: The Dancer's Life, Say Goodnight Gracie

== Film co-producer ==
- Broadway: The Golden Age
- Broadway: Beyond The Golden Age

== Awards ==
Tony Awards

- The Ferryman (2018–2019)
- The Band's Visit (2017-2018)
- Angels In America (2017-2018)
- Once On This Island (2017-2018)
- A Gentleman's Guide to Love and Murder (2013-2014)
- Vanya and Sonia and Masha and Spike (2012-2013)
- The Norman Conquests (2008-2009)

Broadwayworld Audience Choice Awards

- Once on This Island
- The Play That Goes Wrong on Broadway

Drama Desk Awards

- Angels in America
- Gentleman's Guide to Love and Murder
- Vanya and Sonia and Masha and Spike
- The Norman Conquests

Drama League Awards

- The Ferryman
- The Waverly Gallery
- Angels in America
- The Band's Visit
- Gentleman's Guide to Love and Murder
- Vanya and Sonia and Masha and Spike
- Blithe Spirit

Off-Broadway Alliance Awards

- Fiddler on the Roof in Yiddish
- Exit Strategy
