= Event videography =

Practice of capturing and producing videos of social events

Event videography is a video production, the art of capturing and editing social and special events onto video by a videographer. The term is used to describe the videography of any event, aside from weddings and wedding videography.

== History ==
Event videography is an offshoot of wedding videography and encompasses the video documentation of social functions, such as First Communions, anniversaries, dance recitals, bar mitzvahs, color guard contests, proms, concerts, etc.

Event videography started shortly after the introduction of consumer-based video cameras, or camcorders, in the late 1970s, as videographers, who had businesses documenting weddings, began to look for other markets to offer their services.

== Event videography today ==
The art of event videography is somewhat similar today as it was back when the camcorder was first introduced. The main differences lie in the improved video camera technology and equipment. Advances in high definition technology are being applied to event videography.

== See also ==
- Camera angle
- Camera operator
- Underwater videography
- Wedding photography
- Wedding videography
