= Aaronel deRoy Gruber =

American painter, sculptor and photographer

- Born: July 10, 1918; Pittsburgh, Pennsylvania
- Died: July 6, 2011 (aged 92); Pittsburgh, Pennsylvania, United States
- Occupation: Artist

Aaronel deRoy Gruber (July 10, 1918 – July 6, 2011) was an American painter, sculptor, photographer and artist. Her works are included in several museum collections and over her career her work was a part of both solo and group exhibitions including a retrospective exhibition at the Westmoreland Museum of American Art in 2013. In 2000 she cofounded the Irving and Aaronel deRoy Gruber Foundation with her husband Irving.

== Early life ==
Aaronel deRoy Gruber was born on July 10, 1918, in Pittsburgh, Pennsylvania. Her father was a dentist who oversaw fourteen dental offices. He died when she was fifteen. Her mother was a seamstress. She is a graduate of Carnegie Institute of Technology in 1940 with a degree in costume design. In 1951 she took up art classes in order to become a professional artist.

== Career ==
She was part of the abstract painting collective Group A, and became involved in the Abstract Expressionist movement. She began her career as a painter, and in 1959 she was awarded the first prize at the Art Directions Gallery Annual in New York City for her painting Intonations, a prize that included her first solo exhibition. In 1961 she was awarded the First Prize in Oil Painting by the Associated Artists of Pittsburgh Annual Exhibition for her work “Mystery”. After this she began sculpting in the early 1960s, upon the recommendation of sculptor David Smith, who had judged the competition. By the late 1960s, she began working in the mediums of Uvex and Plexiglas, in addition to forged steel. In 1976 she had a retrospective exhibition at William Penn Memorial Museum, Harrisburg, Pennsylvania. In 1976 her sculpture Steelcityscape was awarded first prize in a Society of Sculptors exhibition. Additional works of hers included vacuum-formed plastic jewelry.

During the late 1980s, she also took up photography. She first utilized panoramic cameras, notably Widelux and Noblex film cameras, and later moved to digital photography. In 1993, she was selected as a Pittsburgh Master Visual Artist. In 1998 her photographs were exhibited at the Columbus Museum of Art in a solo exhibition entitled The Urban Landscape Transformed, that featured wide-angle photography of cityscapes. In 2000, Donald Miller released a book on her career entitled Aaronel: The Art of Aaronel DeRoy Gruber. For one of her last exhibitions, she partnered with artist Deanna Mance to create pieces for the 2010 Associated Artists of Pittsburgh Centennial Exhibition. At the time of her death the Pittsburgh City Paper stated she was, “likely the longest-active prominent artist in Pittsburgh,” and after her death her work has continued to be exhibited in art exhibitions, including those on the history of Pennsylvania.

In 2013 her work was the subject of a career exhibition at the Westmoreland Museum of American Art entitled Aaronel deRoy Gruber: Art(ist) in Motion. Her work has also been used as an inspiration for people in other mediums, including fashion designer Adam Selman, who used her work as an inspiration for pieces in his 2016 collection. Her work is included in museums including the Frick Museum in New York City, the Carnegie Museum of Art, the Smithsonian Institution, and the Westmoreland Museum of Art.

== Foundation ==
In 2000 the Irving and Aaronel deRoy Gruber Foundation was established in order to house a collection of works by Aaronel deRoy Gruber and “to engage Pittsburgh-based and regional artists and initiatives connected to photography, sculpture and painting,” according to the Foundation's mission statement. Its headquarters were moved to the Ice House Studios in 2020, and displays a collection of Gruber's works, in addition to being home to interactive programs and temporary exhibitions of other artists. Outside the building there are also ten large-scale solid steel and aluminum sculptures, several of which the artist produced in conjunction with American Forge & Manufacturing Co.

== Personal life ==
Aaronel deRoy Gruber died on July 6, 2011. Her husband, Irving, was owner of American Forge & Manufacturing, and died two years after her. They had three children: Jon, their son Terry deRoy Gruber who became a professional photographer, and her daughter Jamie deRoy, who became a Broadway performer and producer who has received seven Tony Awards.
