= Banquet photography =

Photography of large groups of people with the objective of commemorating an event

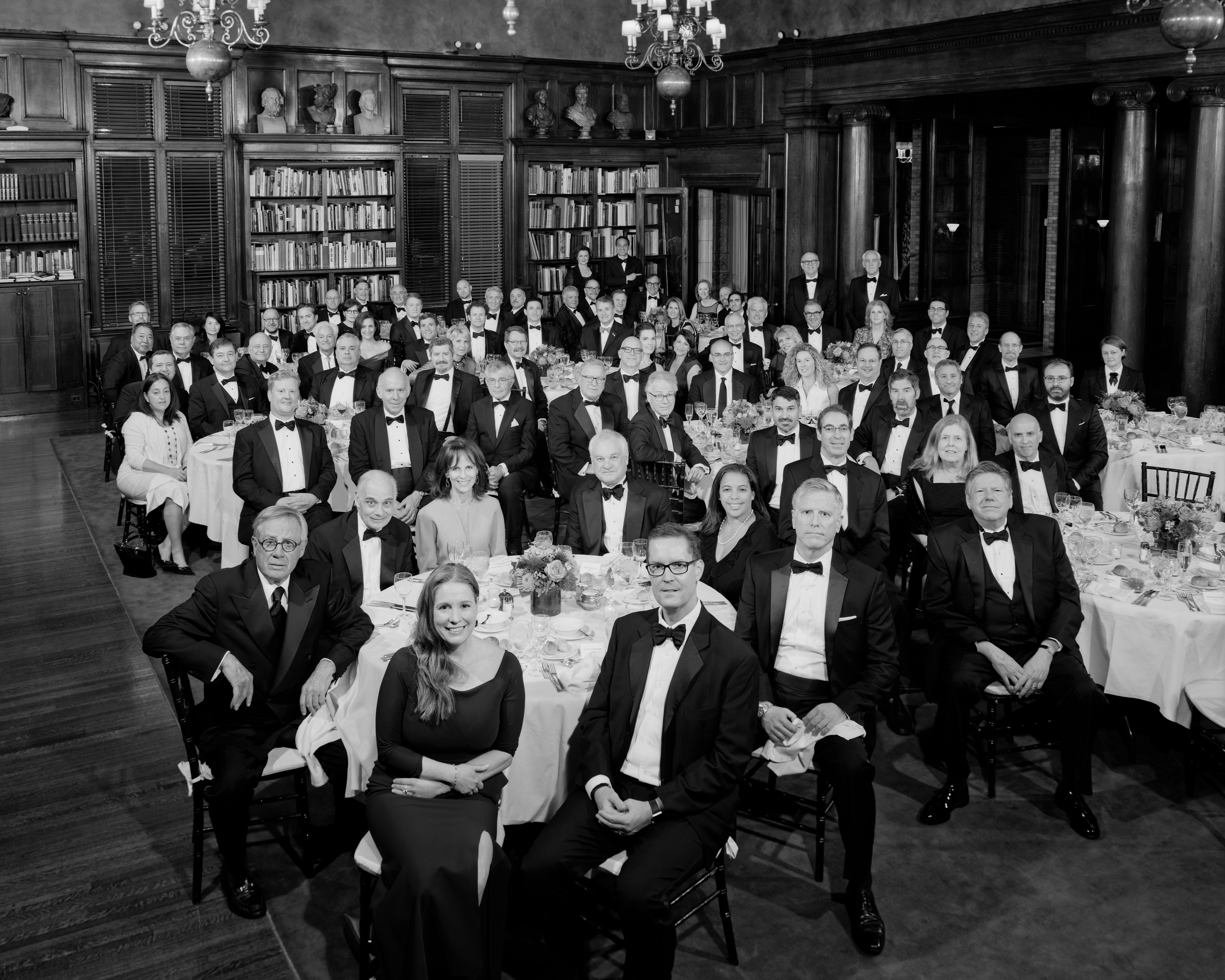
Modern banquet photograph.

Banquet photography is the photography of large groups of people, typically in a banquet setting such as a hotel or club banquet room, with the objective of commemorating an event. Clubs, associations, unions, circuses and debutante balls have all been captured by banquet photographers.

A banquet photograph is usually taken in black and white with a large format camera, with a wide angle lens, from a high angle to ensure that each person is in focus while seated at their table. Large cameras such as a 12×20 view camera or a panoramic camera were used. The defining characteristic of a banquet photograph is the depth of focus and detail and clarity of the image.

Banquet photography was most popular in the 1890s, and had mostly waned by the 1970s. In part its decline is owed to the difficult technical aspects of producing quality banquet photos, the difficulty of printing such large negatives, and the expense and size of the equipment needed. Today, though hard to find, there are a handful of photographers still shooting banquet photos with flashbulbs and large format film cameras.

== History ==
Lighting for a banquet photograph was originally done with flash powder. Magnesium is the metallic element that fuels flash powder and it was 1864 when Alfred Brothers made the first portrait with magnesium light. The first flashbulbs were developed by the Hauser Company in Germany in 1930 and within a decade flashbulbs began replacing flash powder as a light source. It was in 1939 that William Randolph Hearst hosted a meeting of his editors when the photographer taking the large group photograph was badly burned by an explosion of flash powder. Hearst decreed that from that point on all of his photographers were required to use flashbulbs only.

Some noted banquet photographers were Edward J Kelty (1888–1967) who was an early banquet camera user who photographed circuses predominantly with traditional banquet cameras. Eugene Omar Goldbeck (1892–1986) known as the "unofficial photographer of America's military," used Cirkut cameras which worked outside and rotated, whereas the traditional banquet camera with flashbulbs worked just as well inside. Miles Weaver (1879–1932) ran one of the largest banquet and panoramic photography studios in Los Angeles. His work included early Academy Award celebrations, religious revivals, movie publicity stills and bathing beauty pageants. George R. Lawrence (1869–1938) was renowned for developing a flash powder that permitted indoor banquet photography. His system required flash powder in many locations around a room, sometimes in as many as 350 spots. A single electric charge exploded all the powder, generating more light and less smoke than previous methods. In New York city from 1923 to 1995 The Standard Flash Company and later known as Standard Studios with principal photographers Kenneth Brooks (1926–1995) and Jayson Jons (1922–2012) (born John Selepec) photographed thousands of banquet photos. In Chicago Thomas Yanul (1940–2014) did banquet photos for both corporate and social events. Modern photographers that still use the original technology includes Terry Gruber, who uses a 100-year-old, 12×20-inch banquet camera for contemporary occasions.

== Picture-making process ==
=== Camera setup ===
Hours before an indoor banquet photograph is to be taken the banquet photographer sets up their large format, commonly 12”x20” banquet camera, in a corner of the room on a tall tripod or from the balcony and stands on a ladder to reach the camera. With a wide-angle lens set to the widest aperture and the shutter open, the photographer frames the picture on the ground glass with the aid of a light shielding dark cloth over their head. Importantly, the view of the scene on the ground glass is both upside and backwards. Left is right and right is left.

=== Framing ===
With the help of an assistant holding a lit candle or lantern the assistant walks to the bottom of the frame close to the camera where the closest people will be, the photographer looks at the top of the ground glass to adjust where the seated person will be cropped. The assistant goes to the left side of the room the photographer views the right side of the ground glass to see if the people at the table will be visible. This continues until left right and top and bottom of the composition are framed up while the banquet photographer makes framing adjustments in order to determine if all people seated at tables are going to be in the picture.

=== Focus ===
Using the view camera's rise and fall, tilt and shift the photographer meticulously focuses the camera on the candle as the assistant moves from front to middle and to back of the frame. Once the camera is focused the photographer tightens everything into a locked position. The shutter is cocked. The lens is closed down to a small aperture. The dry plate holder or film holder is mounted over the ground glass.

Lighting for flat (non-rotating cameras): Flash powder in troughs or flashbulbs with silver reflectors are strung in a series from the balcony or floor to the left and to the right of the camera around the perimeter of the room and out of the camera's view.

=== Enter the guests ===
Anybody sitting at a table that can not be seen by the fixed lens of the camera is asked to move to the rear of the room to stand behind the last row of tables. As soon as everyone is in their seats, and the people who would have been missed have moved into frame several last steps are critical to taking the photograph. The photographer pulls out the dark slide from the film holder to allow light to strike the emulsion of the film. It is handed to an assistant. The photographer silences the group. Subjects are directed to turn and face towards and look up at the camera. The photographer cues the participants that they will count down and say open and that they need to be absolutely motionless during the explosion of the flash for two seconds. With the air-driven, lemon-sized rubber bulb release which opens the Packard shutter in one hand, and a switch which ignites the flash lighting and exposes the film in the other, the photographer gives their cue, opens the shutter, ignites the flash waits until the light diminishes and releases the bulb which closes the shutter. The assistant hands the dark slide to the photographer who slides it back into the film holder so the exposed film is protected and the film holder is taken from the back of the camera and placed into a light safe bag.

=== Processing and proof prints ===
While the banquet team disassembles the lights and camera, the film is taken into a darkroom and developed. Meantime several studio employees canvas the crowd taking orders from the guests. Back in the darkroom, as soon as the negative is dry, several rush contact prints are processed and brought back to the party where the photo studio employees can take more orders by showing off “the proof."
