= Wedding photography =

Photography of wedding ceremonies

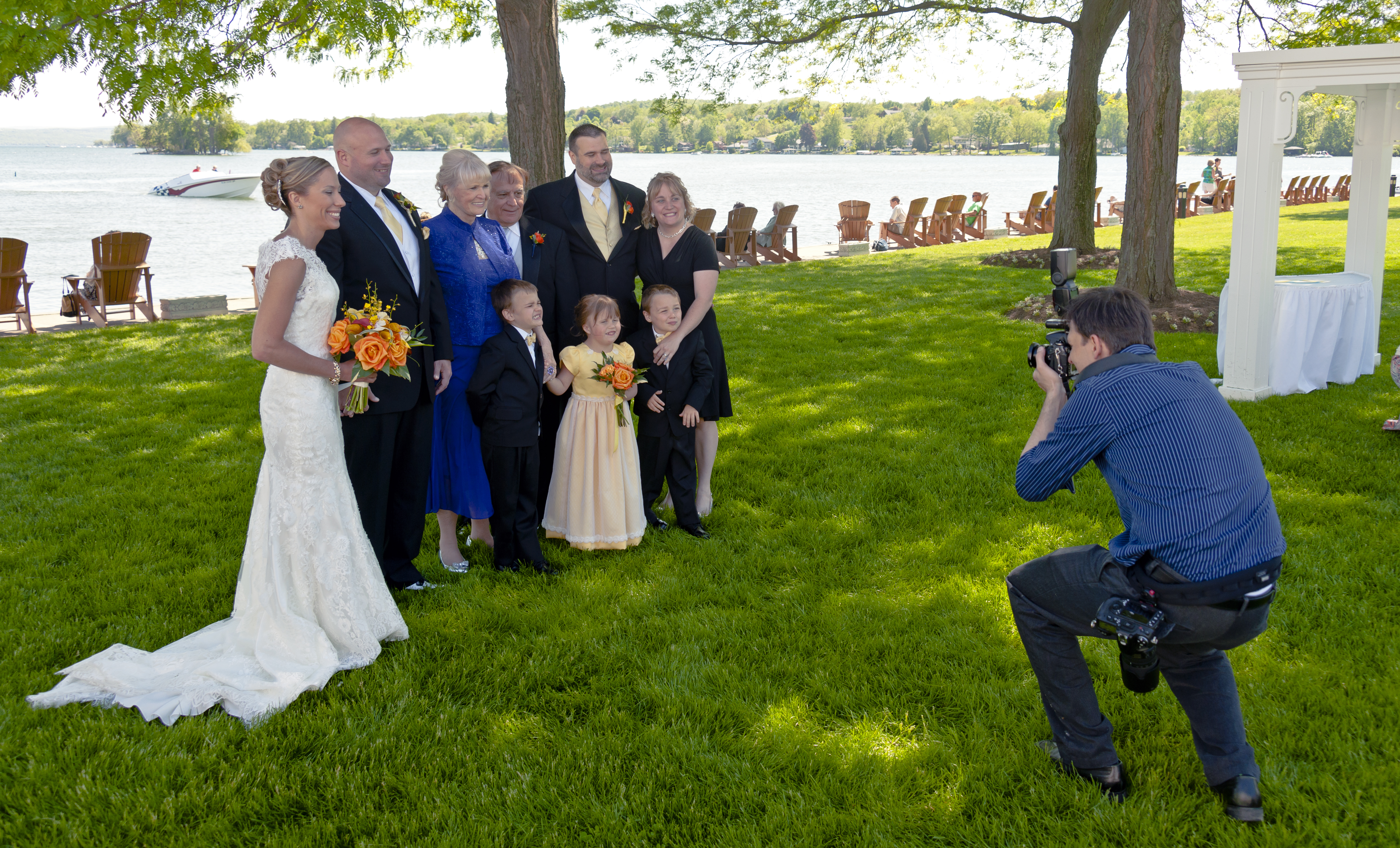
A wedding photographer taking a picture of the bride and her new husband with his family

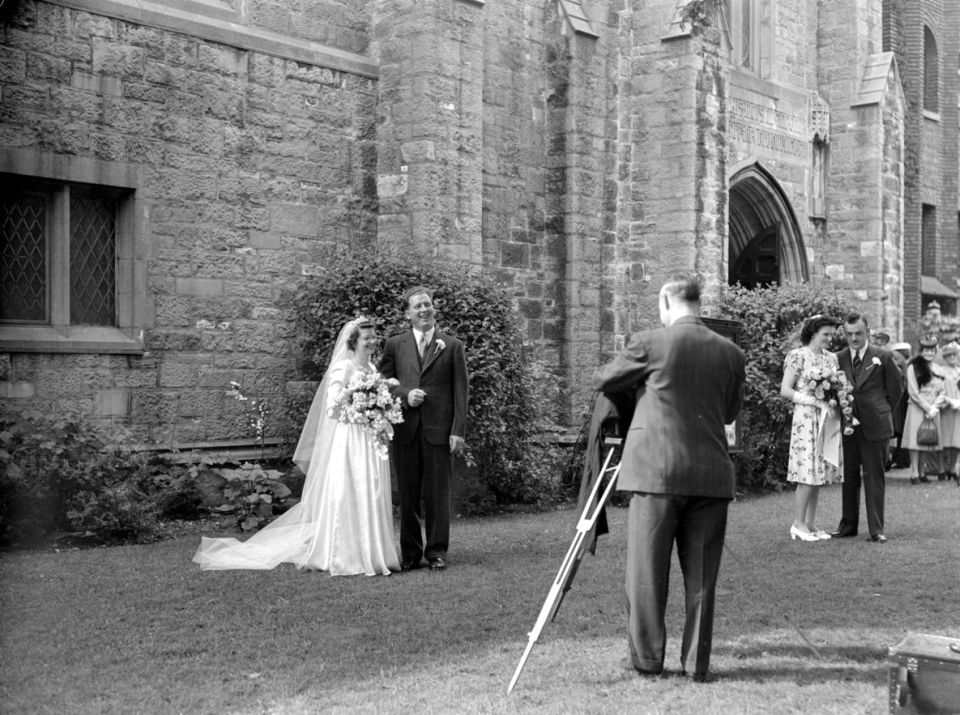
A newlywed couple standing in front of a church and their wedding photographer, Westmount, Montreal, 1945

Wedding photography is a specialty in photography that is primarily focused on the photography of events and activities relating to weddings. It may include other types of portrait photography of the couple before the official wedding day, such as a pre-wedding engagement session, in which the photographs are later used for the couple's wedding invitations. On the wedding day, the photographer(s) will provide portrait photography as well as documentary photography to document the different wedding events and rituals throughout the day(s).

== History ==
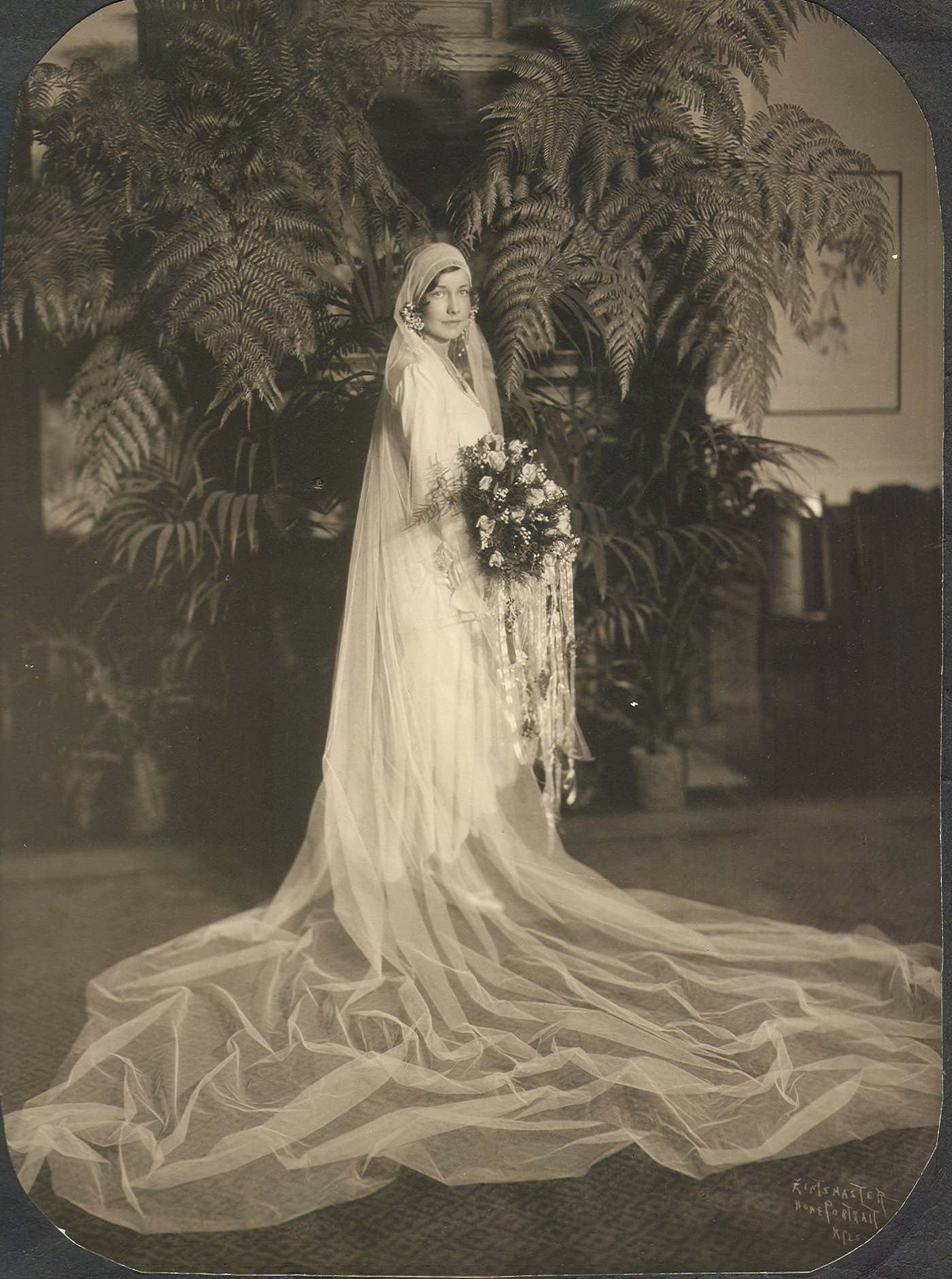
A formal photograph of a bride in 1929

The practice of wedding photography has evolved and grown since the invention of the photographic art form. However, in the early days of photography, most couples did not hire a photographer to record the actual wedding itself. Rather, they might have posed for a formal photo in their best clothes before or after a wedding. In the late 1860s, more couples started posing in their wedding clothes or sometimes hired a photographer to come to the wedding venue.

Due to the nature of the bulky equipment and lighting issues, wedding photography was largely a studio practice for most of the late 19th century. Wedding albums started becoming more commonplace in the 1880s, and the photographer would sometimes include the wedding party in the photographs.

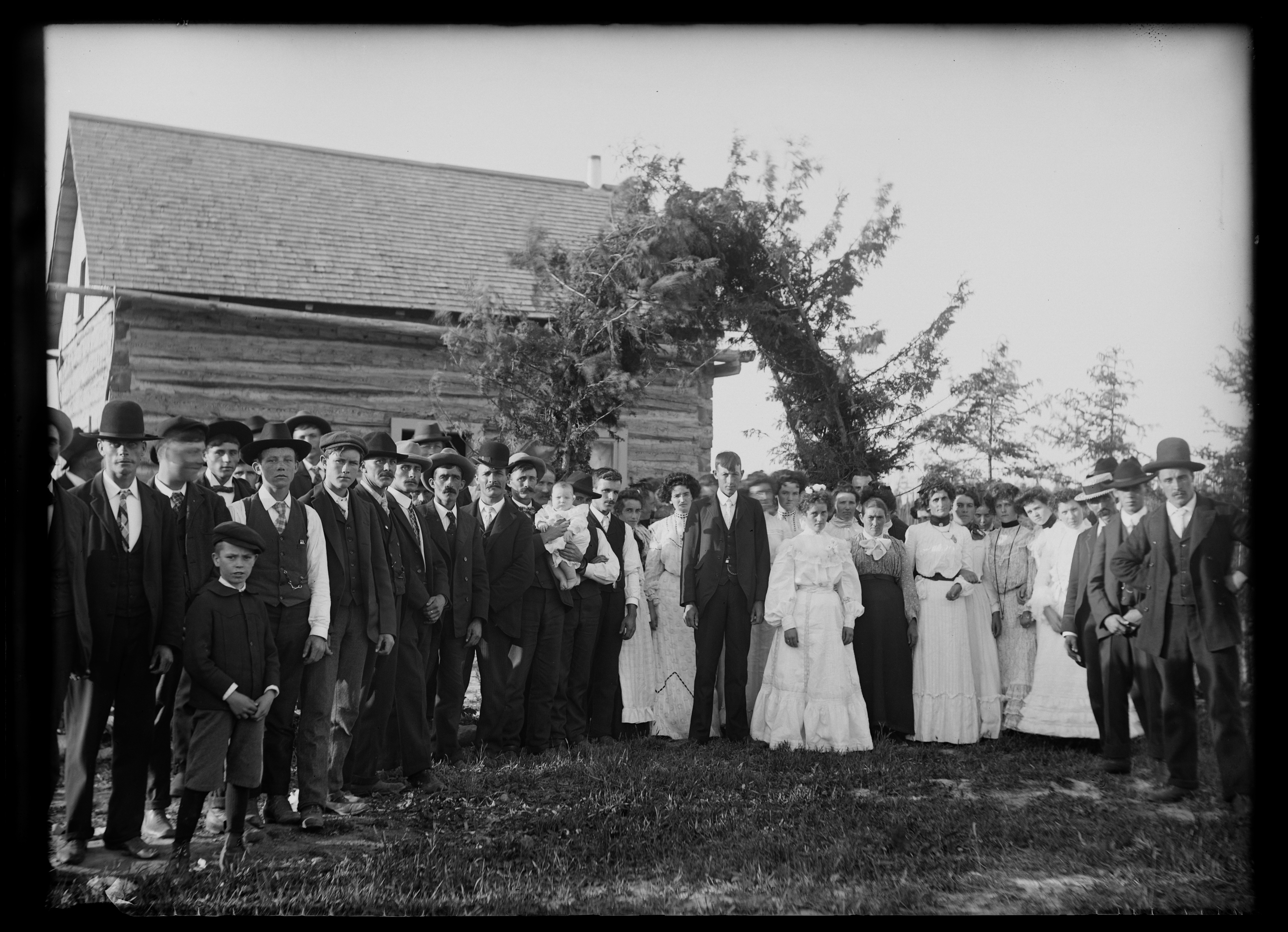
Wedding party photo from the Rainy River District, ca. 1905.

At the beginning of the 20th century, color photography became available, but was still unreliable and expensive, so most wedding photography was still practiced in black and white. The concept of capturing the wedding "event" came about after the Second World War. Using film roll technology and improved lighting techniques available with the invention of the compact flash bulb, photographers would often show up at a wedding and try to sell the photos later. Despite the initial low-quality photographs that often resulted, the competition forced the studio photographers to start working on location.

Initially, professional studio photographers might bring a lot of bulky equipment, thus limiting their ability to record the entire event. Even "candid" photos were more often staged after the ceremony. In the 1970s, the more modern approach to recording the entire wedding event started evolving into the practice as we know it today, including a more "documentary photography" style of photography.

== Technology ==
During the film era, photographers favored colour negative film and medium-format cameras, especially Hasselblad. Today, many more weddings are photographed with digital SLR cameras as the digital convenience provides quick detection of lighting mistakes and allows creative approaches to be reviewed immediately.

In spite of this trend, some photographers continue to shoot with film as they prefer the film aesthetic, and others are of the opinion that negative film captures more information than digital technology, and has less margin for exposure error. Certainly true in some cases, exposure latitude inherent in a camera's native Raw image format (which allows for more under- and over- exposure than JPEG) varies from manufacturer to manufacturer. All forms of RAW have a degree of exposure latitude that exceeds slide film - to which digital capture is commonly compared.

The introduction of ILC (interchangeable lens cameras) mirrorless cameras such as the Fuji XT-2 and the Sony A7 series in 2015 / 2016 was significant for PJ wedding photographers.

== Approaches ==
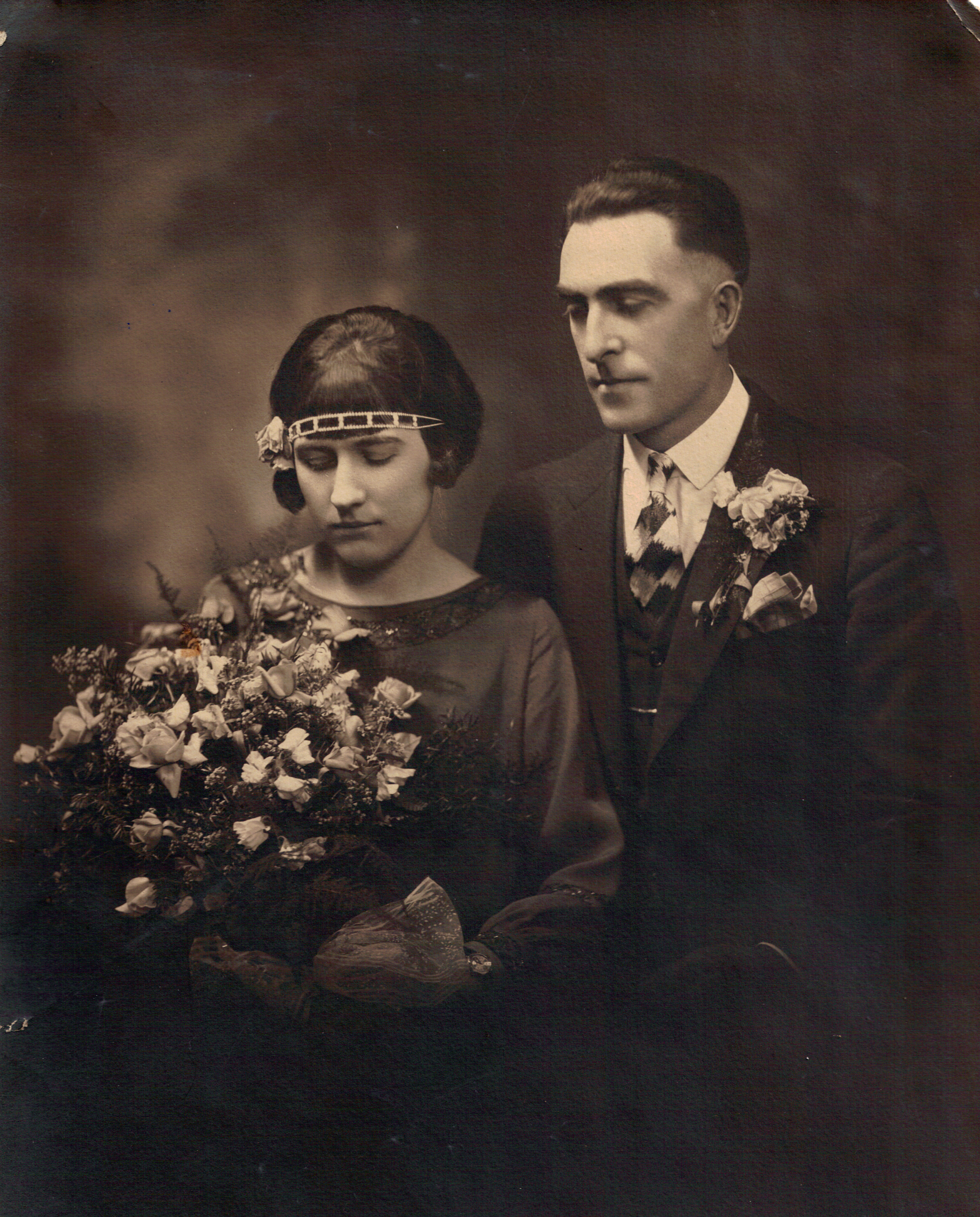
Wedding couple portrait circa 1926. In the early days of wedding photography, usually only several posed portraits of the couple were photographed.

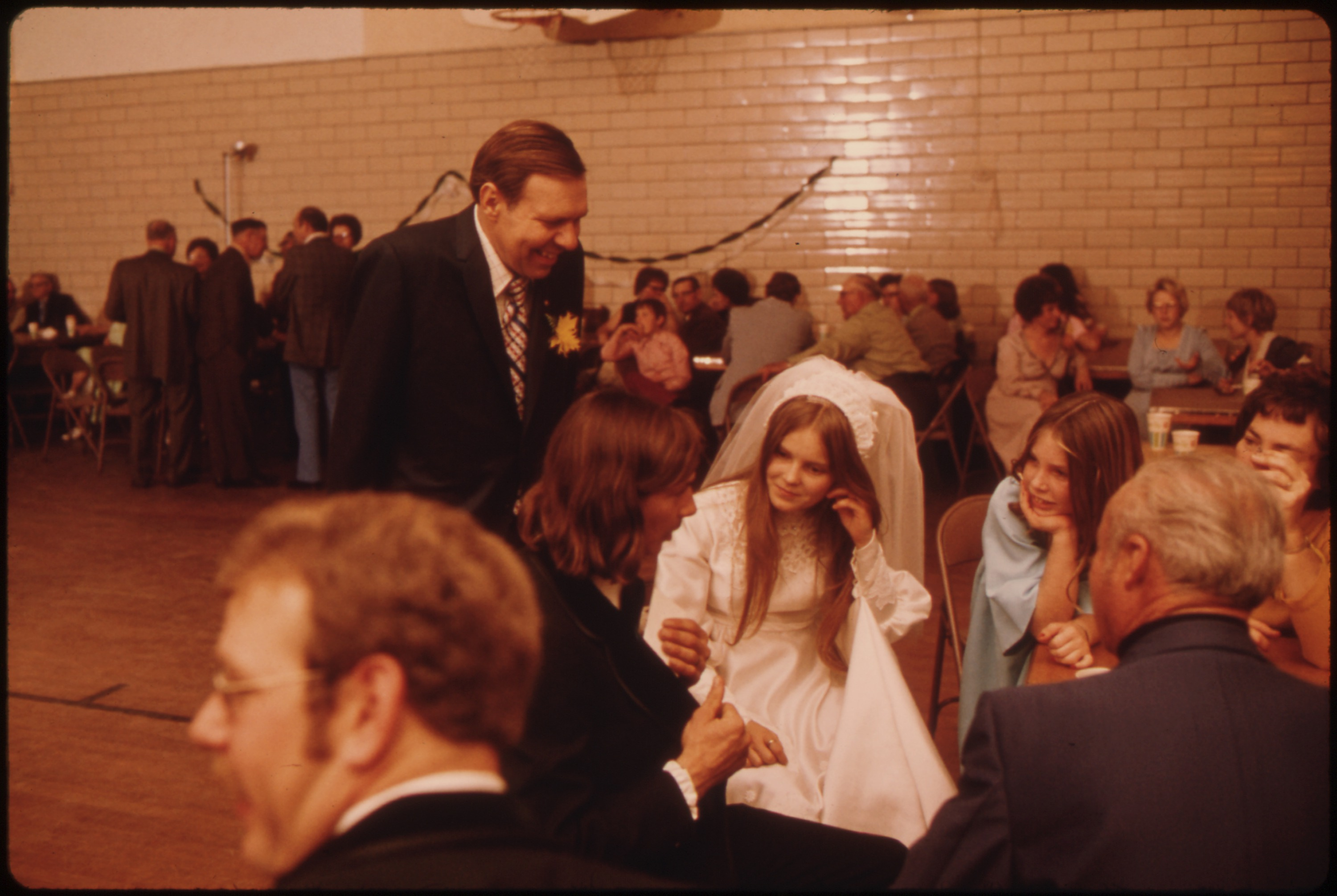
Wedding photography with a photojournalistic approach.

Traditional wedding photography provides for more classically posed images and a great deal of photographer control during the ceremony.

A photojournalistic style of wedding photography takes its cue from editorial reporting styles and focuses more on candid images with little photographer interaction; a wedding photojournalist typically shoots images quickly using available light or on-camera flash rather than using traditional, formal posing techniques and studio lights.

A third style is a fashion-based approach. In contemporary/fashion-based wedding photography, a photographer will combine candid images of the events of the day with posed images that are inspired by editorial fashion photography. This style often involves more dramatic post-processing of images.

A fourth style that is popular in Asian countries, especially in China, is wedding studio photography (Chinese: 婚纱摄影; pinyin: hūn shā shè yǐng). Typically, couples will make an appointment with a studio for an in-studio or location shoot, with support from a hairstylist and make-up artist in addition to the photographer and the couple. The couple will go through many changes of clothing and backgrounds in a similar manner to the fashion-based approach.

The term contemporary wedding photography is used to describe wedding photography that is not of a traditional nature. The emphasis in contemporary photography is to capture the atmosphere of the day.

== Services ==
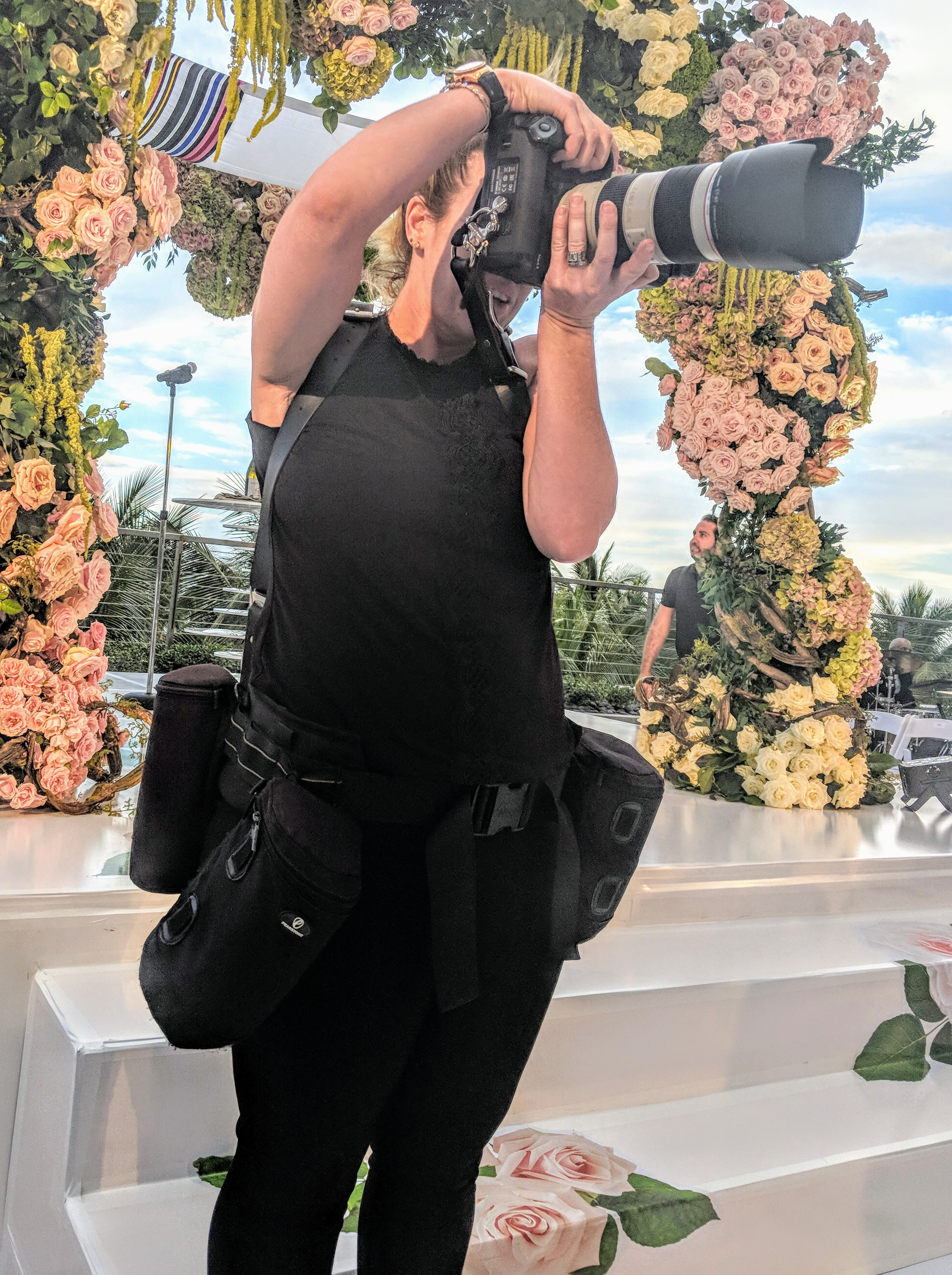
A wedding photographer at work in Miami Beach

The range of deliverables that a wedding photographer presents is varied. There is no standard as to what is included in a wedding coverage or package, so products vary regionally and from across photographers, as do the number of images provided.

Most photographers provide a set of proofs (usually unretouched, edited images) for the clients to view. Photographers may provide hard copy proofs in the form of small prints, a "magazine" of images with thumbnail-sized pictures on multiple pages. Alternatively, they will provide an online proofing gallery.

There are a wide variety of albums and manufacturers available, and photographers may provide traditional matted albums, digitally designed "coffee table" albums, contemporary flush mount albums, hardbound books, scrapbook style albums, or a combination of any of the above. Albums may be included as part of a pre-purchased package, or they may be added as an after-wedding purchase. Not all photographers provide albums; some may prefer to provide prints and/or files and let clients make their own albums.

Most photographers allow clients to purchase additional prints for themselves or their families. Many photographers now provide online sales either through galleries located on their own websites or through partnerships with other vendors.

The owner of the pictures' copyright is often explicitly stated in the contract for photographic services. Without such an explicit statement, the owner of the pictures' copyright will depend on the country involved as copyright laws vary from country to country.

== Profession ==
Falling under the broader category of photographers, most often work on location taking photographs of wedding events on a contractual basis. According to the U.S. Bureau of Labor Statistics (BLS), 64% of photographers were self-employed as of 2018. Photographers earned a median salary of $34,000 per year as of May 2018. The number of employed photographers was expected to decline by 6% between 2018 and 2028.

== Professional organizations ==
Organizations such as the Professional Photographers of America (PPA), Society of Wedding and Portrait Photographers (SWPP), International Society of Professional Wedding Photographers (ISPWP), Professional Photographers of Canada (PPOC), Australian Institute of Professional Photography (AIPP), Wedding and Portrait Photographers International (WPPI) and Wedding Photojournalist Association (WPJA) support the art and business of wedding photography. WPJA awards an annual Photographer of the Year Award to recognize the best in wedding photojournalism.

In the UK there are many organizations including the Master Photographers Association (MPA) and the British Institute of Professional Photography (BIPP).

Standards and requirements for professional organizations vary, but membership often indicates a photographer is insured. Professional organizations offer training, professional competition, and support to members, as well as directory services to help with marketing and organise conventions.

== South Asia ==
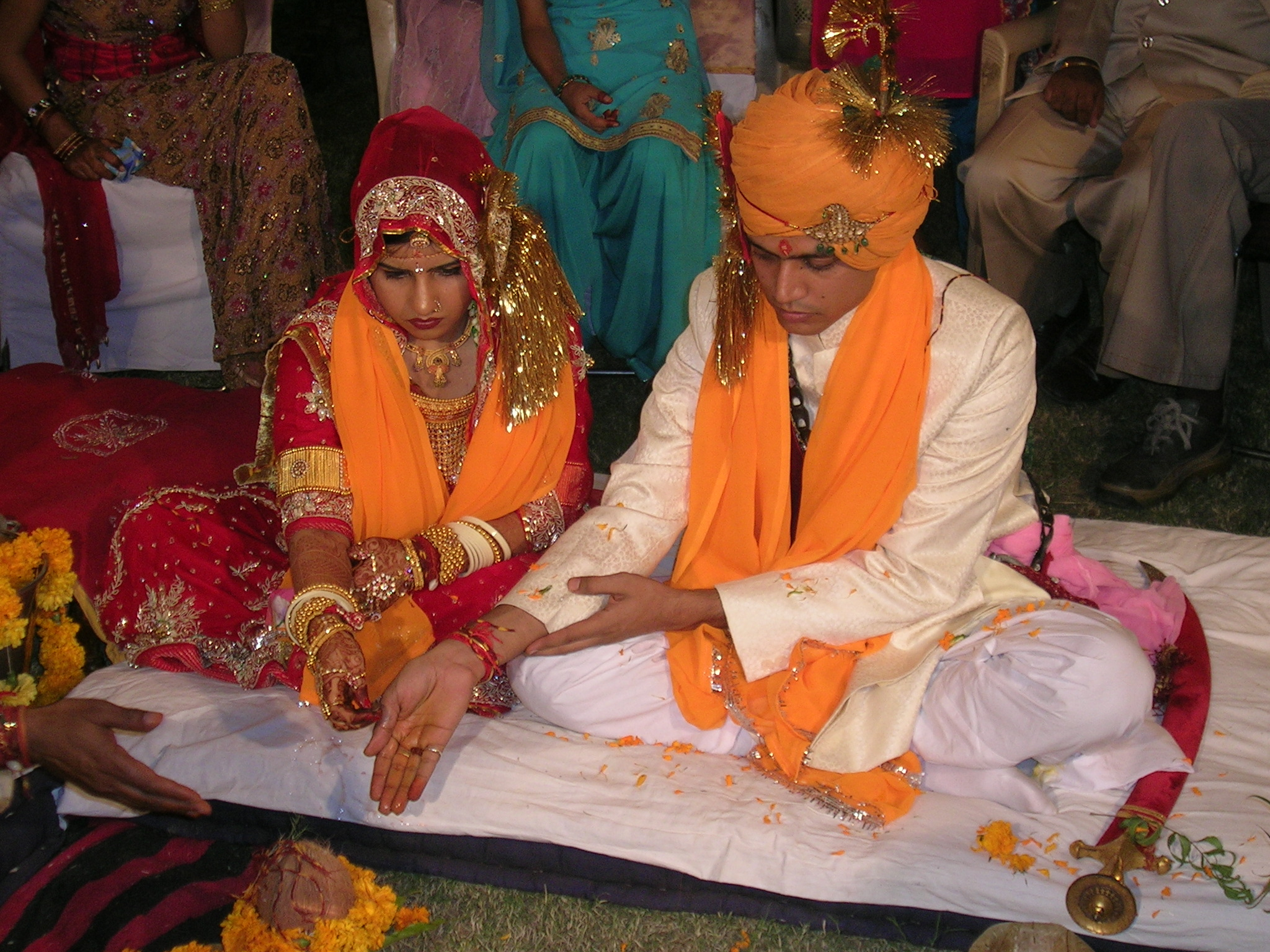
Bride and groom conducting worship together. Indoor flash photography, with the couple in focus

South Asian wedding photography refers to wedding photography of celebrations relating to Indian, Pakistani and other South Asian weddings.

Indian weddings are a Rs. 800 billion industry, which is expected to grow by 25% per annum, with a significant part dedicated to photography.

There are various rituals like the Seven Promises of Indian Marriage which are called as 'Saat Pheras' and are performed on the day of wedding. An Indian marriage is traditionally a public affair, with the bridegroom taken in a procession through the town. Even a modest Indian wedding can have several hundred participants, who are all thought to be "relatives and close family friends". By convention, a photographer is required to include each guest in at least one photograph which includes the bride and the groom. Generally, Indian wedding proceedings do not pause for photographs, requiring the photographers to anticipate the next event and be ready with the right angle. These factors make photographing an Indian wedding significantly different from western weddings.

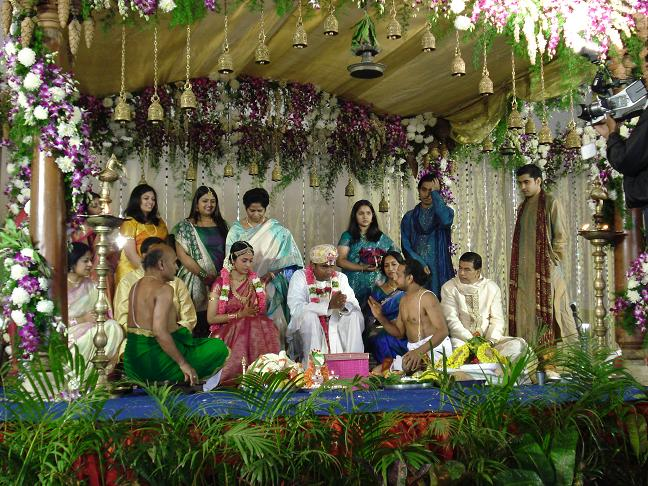
Bride and groom as a royal couple under the mandap, day-time photography with fill-in flash

Wedding photography is now a major commercial endeavor in India that supports the bulk of the efforts for many photographers. There are photographers outside of India that specialize in Indian weddings.

Bright colors such as red and orange are considered especially appropriate in Indian weddings, with photographs often featuring highly saturated tones.

Photographs from some famous Indian weddings have been published widely in newspapers, including the Mittal wedding, Bachchan wedding (Abhishek and Aishwarya), and Ambani wedding.

=== India's "wedding season" ===
In India, a number of weddings take place in the "wedding season". For example, in early October, the city of Delhi can have up about 25,000 weddings a night. That can make it hard to locate wedding photographers for those who have not planned sufficiently in advance. Wedding planning in India is now a $10 billion market. The market in 2022 is to exceed $50 billion as per Business Insider India

=== Technical and cultural challenges ===
Indian wedding photographers need to be aware of the cultural aspects of Indian wedding photography. They may need to understand the symbolism of specific religious rituals and traditional photo compositions are desired.

== Destination wedding photography ==
A "destination wedding" is defined as marrying 100 or more miles from where the marrying couple currently live. The term can also refer to any wedding in which the engaged couple and/or a majority of their guests travel to attend the wedding ceremony. Destination wedding photographers may run into challenges not typically associated with their normal weddings, ranging from location familiarity to client familiarity. Photographers may be familiar with venues if they are shooting locally, but less so elsewhere.

=== Elopement photography ===
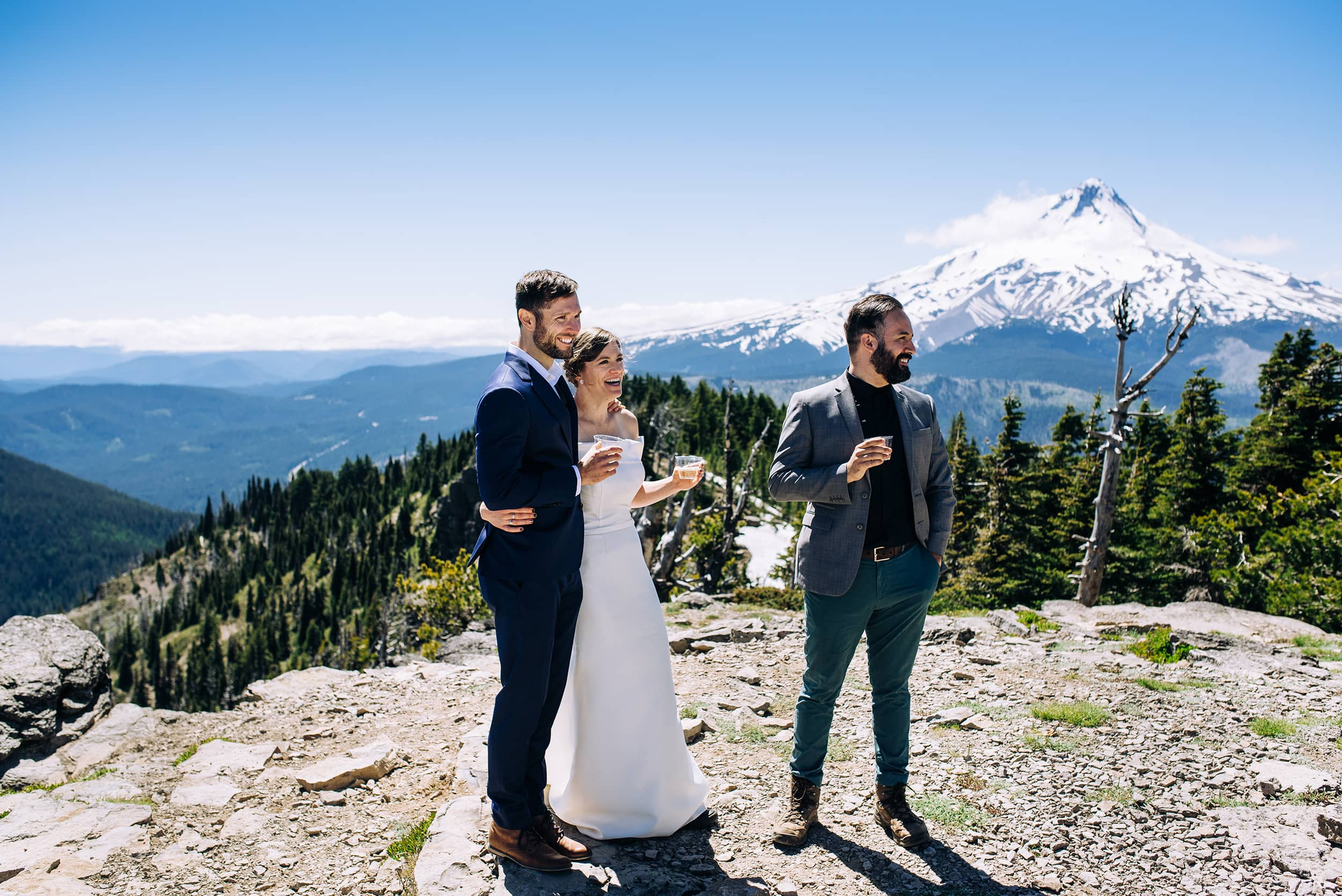
Elopement Wedding Ceremony near Mt. Hood, Oregon

Another form of destination wedding photography is photographing elopements. While the popularity of elopements has been rising for at least the last decade, the emergence of COVID-19 has cemented elopements and micro-weddings as a first choice rather than a quick, forced decision. Elopements are no longer a trend but have been entrenched as a socially acceptable alternative to a larger, traditional wedding. Having an elopement allows couples to get married in ways that are meaningful to them, an opportunity that can be hard to come by with a traditional ceremony.

Photographers who specialize in elopements take on the role of scouting scenic locations, coordinating and planning timelines, and recommending what to wear and what to pack.

== See also ==
- Trash the dress
- Wedding planner
- Wedding videography
- Banquet photography

=== South Asian weddings ===
- Hindu wedding
- Punjabi wedding traditions
