= Wedding videography =

Recording a marriage ceremony in audiovisual and electronic form

Wedding videography is a video production that documents a wedding on video. The final product of the videographer's documentation is commonly called a wedding video. It is also referred to as a wedding movie, or a wedding film.

== History ==
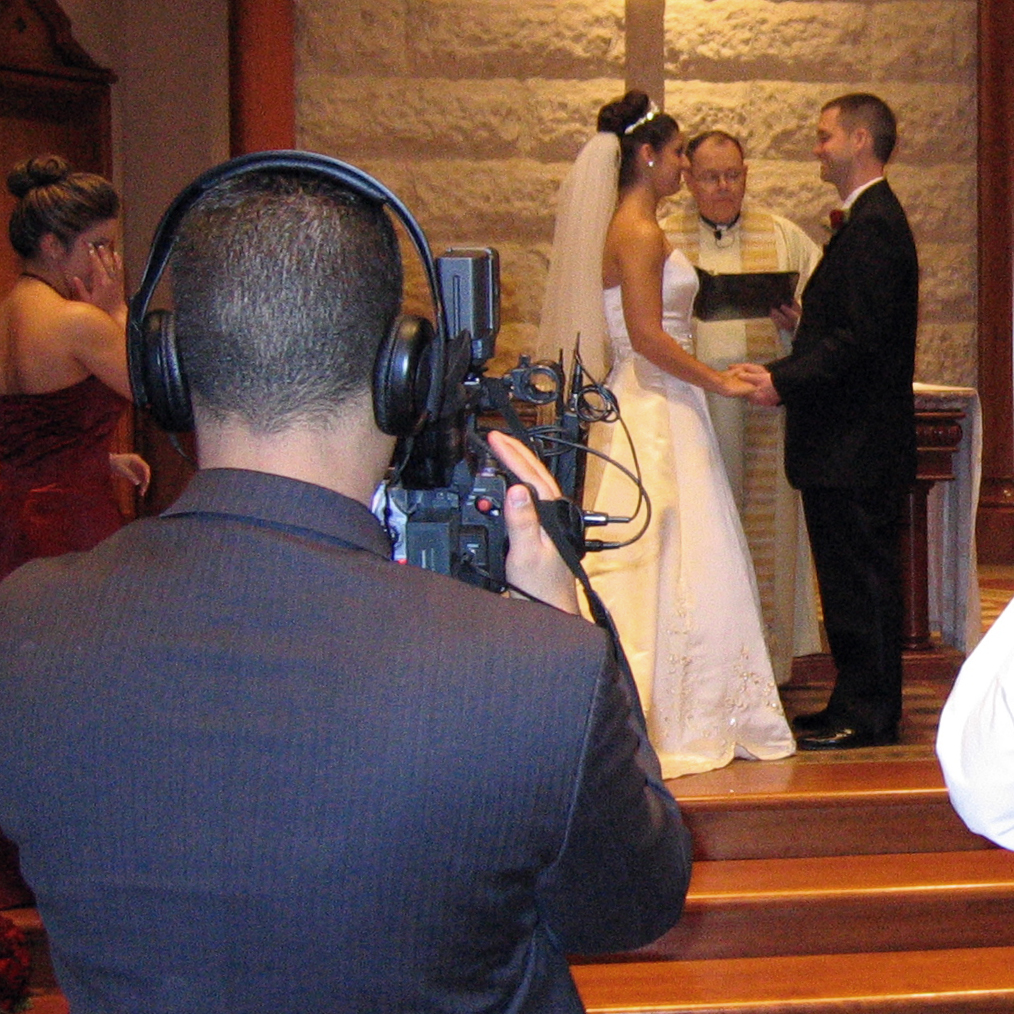
A videographer recording a wedding

Wedding videography can trace its roots back to before the invention of the modern video camera through 8mm and 16mm films. When film was the only way to capture moving pictures, a few enterprising individuals would take the family 8mm camera and film the weddings of friends and family. These film cameras had a major limitation in the form of 4-minute load times. After exposing 4 minutes of film, the operator would have to load a new film cartridge.

With the introduction of early camcorders, wedding video documentation became more popular. The early days of professional wedding videography were marked by primitive technology and technique, with the equipment generally producing low image quality. Cameras required bright lights, had fuzzy pictures, poor color saturation, and single-channel, poor quality audio. The cameras were bulky, with a separate unit that connected to the video recorder via a cable, severely limiting the videographer's movement. In post-production, many wedding videos were not edited. Generation loss was also a limiting factor because of the nature of analog video tape.

In the late 1980s and early 1990s, the state of the industry began to improve. Videographers began to form regional and national organizations: the largest, currently active organization being the Wedding and Event Videographers Association International (WEVA). Manufacturers created a market between the professional video camera and video camera consumer levels, known as the prosumer, which met the needs of this niche market.

Towards the mid-1990s, the manufacturers introduced digital cameras, removing the last of the technological barriers that had impeded wedding videography since it was established. The cameras were small, mobile, worked even better than the already good analog cameras on the market in low light situations, and allowed the videographer to be discreet.

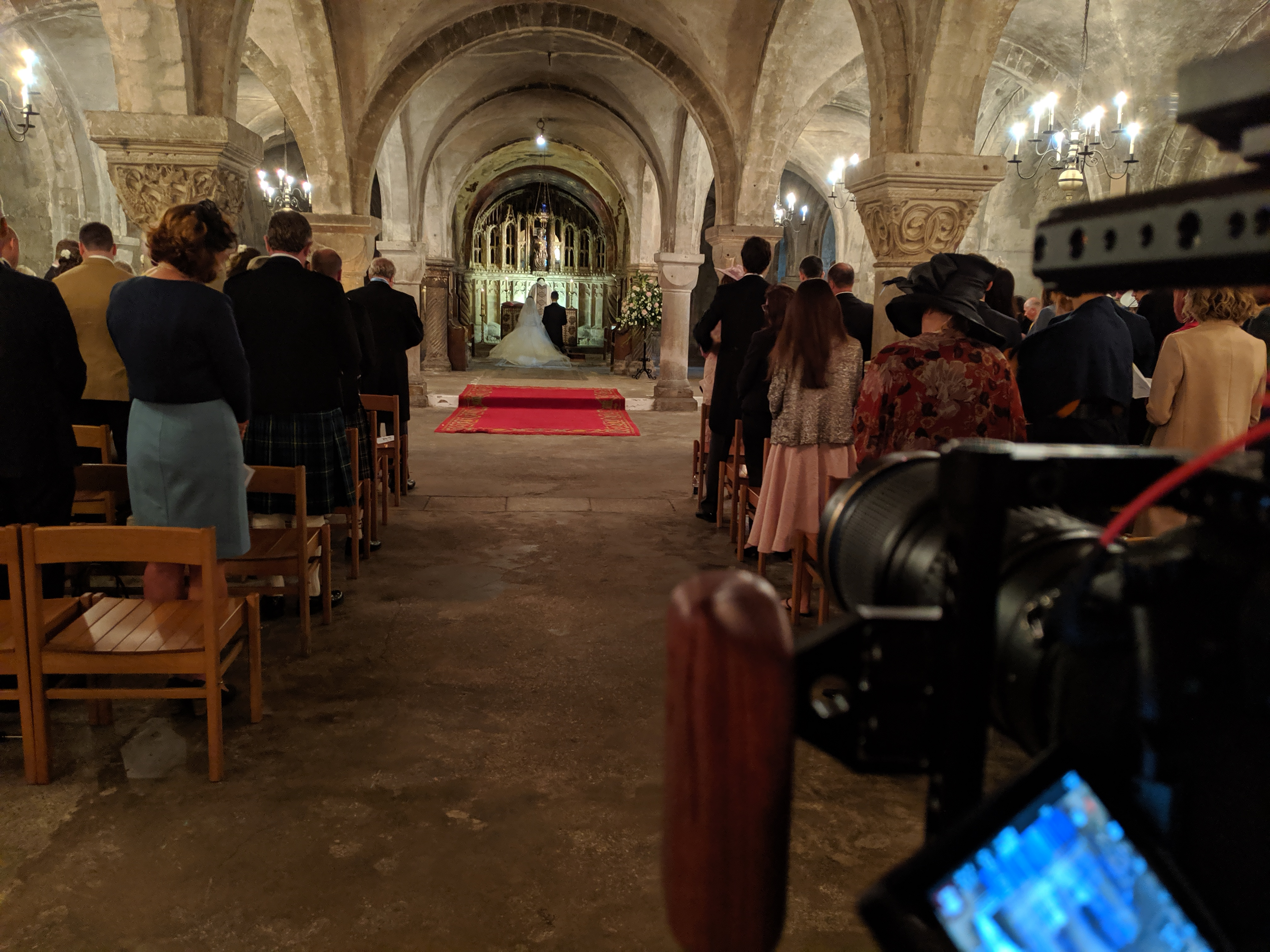
A wedding videographer shooting on smaller DSLR equipment.

Post-production creativity took a major leap forward with the introduction of advanced tools like the Newtek Video Toaster in the early 1990s. This led to the introduction of other relatively inexpensive non-linear editing systems (NLE), which offered the editor many more creative options. But the delivery method still relied on an analog viewing system, VHS video tape. This changed in the late 1990s with introduction of the recordable DVD. Weddings and events were now recorded digitally, edited digitally, and delivered digitally, greatly improving the image quality.

== Typical styles ==
Common styles range from "journalistic" to "cinematic".

Video Journalistic style (also referred to as documentary style)
Typically described as a documentary film of the event. Segments are edited as they occur to preserve continuity. This style of editing will produce a polished documentation of the day as it unfolds.

Cinematic
Cinematic videography/editing is defined as a ‘filmy' look. This style aims to increase the emotional impact through use of slow motion and transition effects, saturated colors, creative camera angles and dramatic music.

Concept videos
Concept wedding video is the most artistic and elaborated type of wedding videos. It is usually scripted and includes a lot of preparation, usually a few pre-wedding shoots, interviews with the couple or guests and finally the wedding video itself.

Instagram videos
Since the rise in popularity of mobile phones and social media apps, especially Instagrams popularity there has been an increase in much shorter wedding videos.

Drone shots
Drones have become more common at weddings which has seen a surge in aerial photography and videography.

== See also ==
- Event videography
- Wedding photography
