= Underwater videography =

Electronic underwater photography concerned with capturing moving images

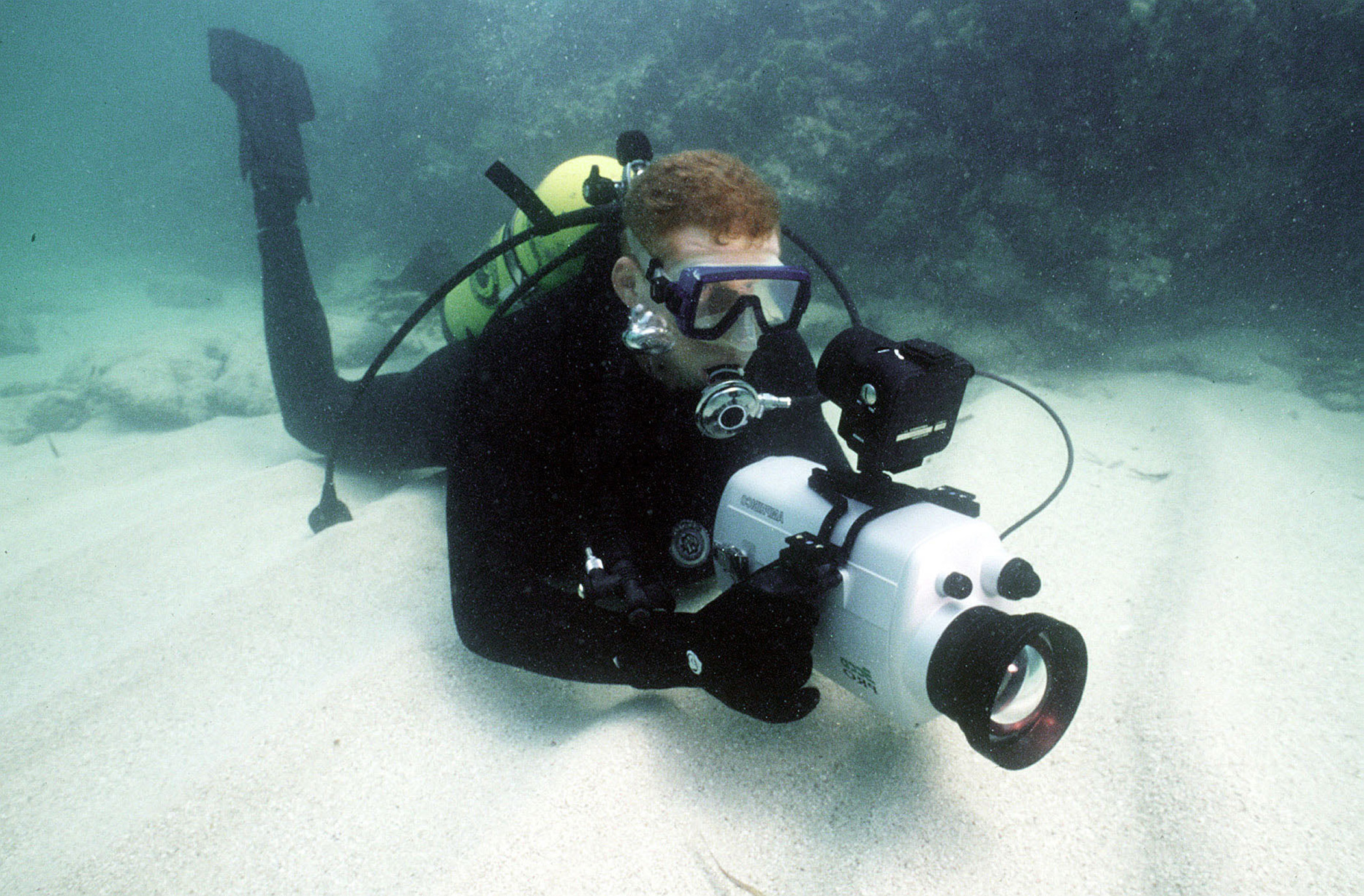
Underwater videographer

Underwater videography is the branch of electronic underwater photography concerned with capturing underwater moving images as a recreational diving, scientific, commercial, documentary, or filmmaking activity. Although technological changes since 1909 have improved the ease of operation and quality of images, significant challenges in the form of protecting equipment from water, low light levels, and the usual hazards of diving must be addressed.

== History ==
In 1909, Albert Samama Chikly took the first underwater shot. In 1910, he filmed Tuna fishing in Tunisia under the patronage of Albert I, Prince of Monaco. In 1940 Hans Hass completed Pirsch unter Wasser (i.e. Stalking under Water) which was published by the Universum Film AG, lasted originally only 16 minutes and was shown in theatres before the main movie, but would eventually be extended by additional filming done in the Adriatic Sea close to Dubrovnik. It premiered in Berlin in 1942.

Sesto Continente directed by Folco Quilici and released in 1954, was the first full-length, full-color underwater documentary. The Silent World is noted as one of the first films to use underwater cinematography to show the ocean depths in color. Its title derives from Jacques-Yves Cousteau's 1953 book The Silent World: A Story of Undersea Discovery and Adventure.

=== Submarine-based ===
The first successful video-recording from a non-military submarine was made in May 1969. The purpose of the recording was to document the inspection and condition of an offshore oil storage unit located in 130 feet (40 m) of water off the Louisiana coast. During the mid-1960s and early 1970s, there was widespread interest in the United States in the topic of oceanography. Several major firms built small research submarines to explore the oceans. The major subs were Deep Star 4000, designed by Jacques Cousteau and built by Westinghouse Electric Company; Aluminaut, the first aluminum sub which was built by and operated by Reynolds Aluminum; Beaver, built by and operated by Rockwell International; Star III, owned and operated by Scripps Institute of Oceanography; and DOWB (Deep Ocean Work Boat), built by and operated by General Motors.

As part of their operations all of these subs attempted video-recordings. None were successful prior to 1969. The problem preventing a successful recording was in the output of the DC to AC power converted. This problem was resolved by using a different type of power converter. This new approach was used on the Shelf Diver, owned and operated by Perry Submarine to obtain the successful video-recording of the inspection of Tenneco's Molly Brown 32,500 barrel oil storage unit. The success of this video-recording ignited an immediate interest in the oil field. Two months later the Shelf Diver was employed by Humble Oil and Refining Company to make a geological survey of the floor of the Gulf of Mexico.

== Limitations ==
The primary difficulty in underwater camera usage is sealing the camera from water at high pressure, while maintaining the ability to operate it. The diving mask also inhibits the ability to view the camera image and to see the monitoring screen clearly through the camera housing. Previously the size of the video camera was also a limiting factor, necessitating large housings to enclose the separate camera and record deck. This results in a larger volume which creates extra buoyancy requiring a corresponding use of heavy weight to keep the housing underwater (about 64 lbs. per cubic foot of displacement or 1.03 kilogram per litre in sea water or 63 lbs per cubic foot of displacement (1 kilogram per litre) in fresh water). Early video cameras also needed large batteries because of the high power consumption of the system. Current Lithium-ion batteries have long run times with relatively light weight and low volume.

Another problem is the lower level of light underwater. Early cameras had problems with low light levels, were grainy, and did not record much color underwater without auxiliary lighting. Large unwieldy lighting systems were problematic to early underwater videography. And last, underwater objects viewed from an airspace with a flat window, such as the eye inside a mask or the camera inside a housing, appear to be about 25% larger than they are. The photographer needs to move farther back to get the subject into the field of view. Unfortunately that puts more water between the lens and the subject resulting in less clarity and reduced color and light. This problem is solved by the use of dome ports. Dome ports allow for very close subject distances, decreasing the in-water light path and improving image brightness and color saturation.

== Modern improvements ==
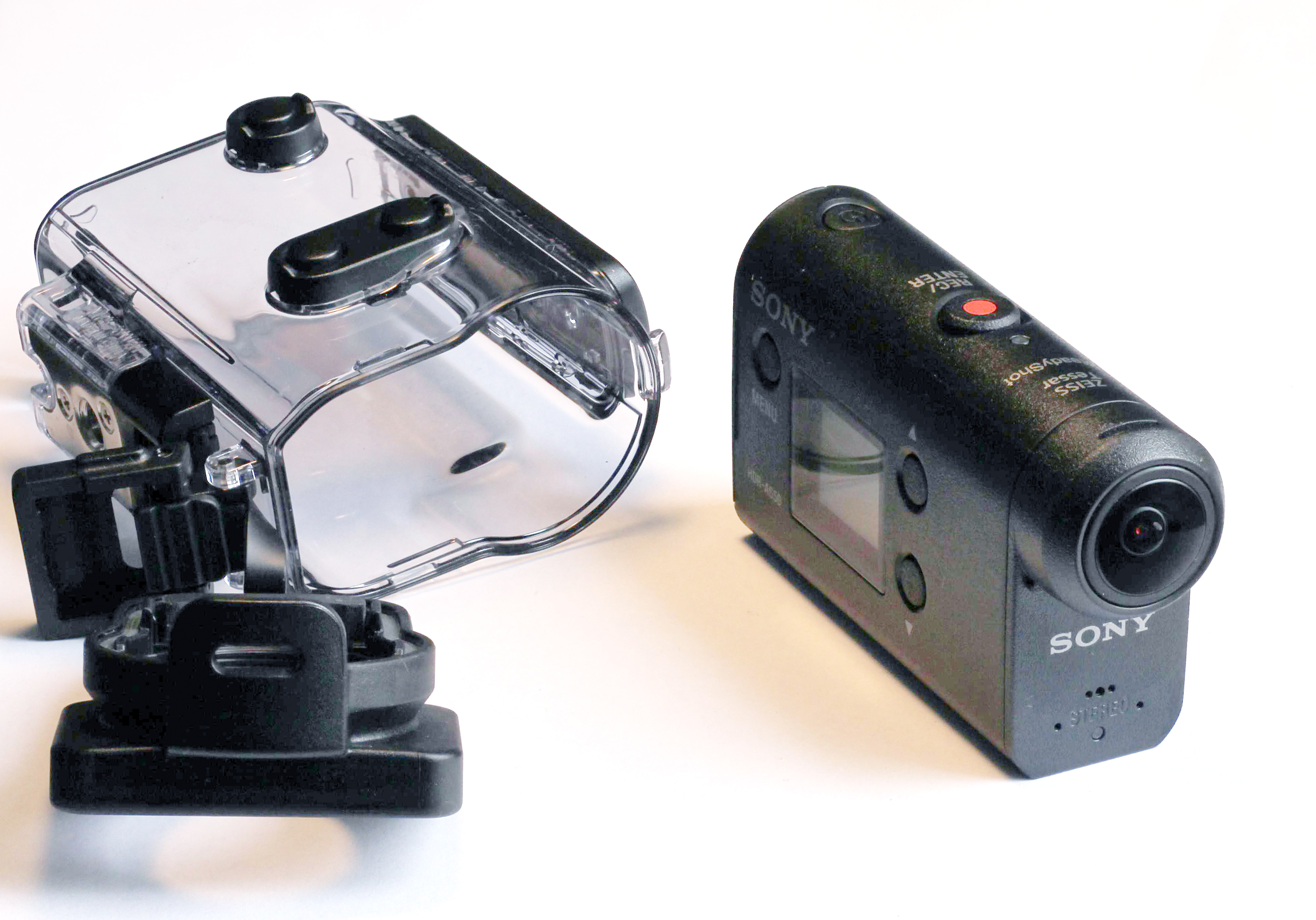
Action-camcorder with underwater housing.

Today, the small size of fully automatic camcorders with large view screens and long-life rechargeable batteries has reduced the housing size and made underwater videography an easy, fun activity for the diver. Low-cost wide-angle lens add-ons are available for many cameras and some can even be fitted outside the camera housing for versatile use. This lets the photographer get closer and make the subject clearer and also with fewer focusing and depth of field problems. Today cameras are more sensitive to low light conditions and make automatic color balancing adjustments. Nevertheless, deeper water videography still needs auxiliary light sources to bring out colors filtered out of sunlight by the distance it has travelled through water. The longest wavelengths of light are lost first (reds and yellows) leaving only a greenish or blue cast in deep water. Even a hand light will help show off some of the magnificent colors of a coral reef or other marine life if used during recording.

Modern underwater video lights are now relatively small, have run times of 45–60 minutes and output 600-8000 lumens. These LED lights are powered by Lithium-ion batteries and usually have a 5600K (daylight) color temperature.

== Video housings ==
Many modern underwater housing are pressure resistant up to about 330 feet (100M). Typical construction is from moulded polycarbonate plastic, or aluminum for more professional systems. They usually have quick release snaps, an o-ring seal, and through housings fittings for several camera controls. A few are generic in nature from several manufacturers (such as Ikelite), and may be adaptable to several camera sizes. Most housings, however, are specific to the size and controls of a particular camera (such as Amphibico) type and may be marketed by the camera manufacturer or an after-market company.

Housed video cameras now record in HD (1920X1080) with some cameras operating at 4K (3840 x 2160) resolutions. Recording media may be solid state Solid-state drives (SSD), SxS cards, professional flash media or SDHC/XC cards. Codecs include H.265, H.264, XAVC and others. Small "action" cameras such as the GoPro style cameras have taken diving by storm and create incredible images for relatively little cost, provided that there is sufficient light. These cameras often record on SDXC/HC or MicroSD cards. These cards should have data record rates of at least 45 MB/s (Ultra) or faster.

Occasionally housings might be advertised as "waterproof housings" rather than underwater housings. Waterproof housings are not intended for deep water use, but rather are splash protection housings for use around the pool, in rain, or to protect if dropped overboard. At the most they are for very shallow activities - usually not more than about 1 or 2 metres / 3 to 6 feet in depth. One manufacturer offers a plastic bag type housing with a watertight seal, and a glass port front. The flexible bag allows some modest camera control, but when taken deeper the air inside the bag compresses from the pressure and makes the controls nearly impossible to operate. These bags are usually limited to shallow snorkeling activities and damage to the bag may cause irreparable flooding damage.

== Still/video combinations ==
Most current digital still cameras are also capable of capturing professional quality video images. This is usually a variation of the MPEG video standard of digital imaging created as a streaming series of digital images, with some advanced compression techniques. Codecs include QuickTime Video, H.265, H.264, WMV or AVI files.

A dedicated video camera, on the other hand may also have a "still frame" or snapshot capability. This is a better choice if the first intent is to have high quality moving pictures and an occasional still picture. Camera capacity, based on videotapes, or even harddrive recording is usually at least 2 hours, and necessitates very little opening of the housing during the dive day. Check the Pixel quality (16 megapixels or above preferred) on the still camera capability if this is of interest. Ultra-high-definition television cameras (4K UHD), provide the best quality and image resolution.

The trend today is toward replaceable memory cards for recording, or internal hard-drives built into the camera. This provides maximum versatility, high recording time options, and few mechanical breakdown possibilities, not to mention minimizing problems with condensation affecting the recording (tape) media of previous generations. The subsequent files may be easily transferred to a computer and edited with low-cost software solutions (and a reasonably high performance computer and video card). The subsequent results may be transferred to a hard drive, CD, DVD, Blu-ray Disc or thumbdrive for easy distribution or archiving. Many videographers maintain their own YouTube or Vimeo channel for sharing and showcasing their work.

== Training and certification ==
Training and certification for recreational divers as hobbyist level underwater videographers is available through some recreational diver training agencies, but professional class underwater videography is demonstrated by the quality of the product, and there is no requirement for certification by a diver training agency. It is a work skill, not a diving skill.

== Risk ==
The usual hazards of underwater diving are generally not directly affected using video equipment, but the risk associated with these hazards may be increased by task loading. This generally reduces the available attention and situational awareness of the operator, and the additional encumbrance of large video equipment reduces the diver's ability to react swiftly and precisely to rectify problems before they become serious. These issues are generally mitigated by practice, and where appropriate an assistant may be useful. Diving with a skilled and attentive buddy can also reduce the risk of problems getting out of control, but this buddy must be dedicated to monitoring the videographer throughout the dive to be of value.
