= Laurie Metcalf on screen and stage =

Performances of American actress Laurie Metcalf

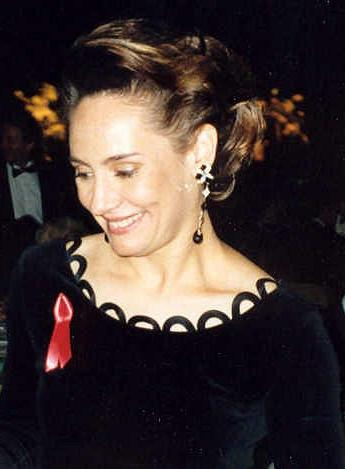
Laurie Metcalf at the 44th Primetime Emmy Awards

Laurie Metcalf is an American actress known for her performances on stage and screen. She started her career on the stage at the Steppenwolf Theater Company in Chicago acting in several productions in the late 1970s. She made her screen debut in an uncredited role in the Robert Altman film A Wedding (1978). She served as a cast member on the NBC sketch series Saturday Night Live for one episode in 1981. Her early film roles include in the comedy drama Desperately Seeking Susan (1985), the comedy Uncle Buck (1989), and the political thriller epic JFK (1991). She gained her breakout role playing Jackie Harris in the ABC sitcom Roseanne (1988–1997, 2018) earning three consecutive Primetime Emmy Awards for Outstanding Supporting Actress in a Comedy Series. Metcalf returned to the role in the continuation series The Conners (2018–2025).

She took supporting roles in the romantic drama Leaving Las Vegas (1995), political satire Bulworth (1998), and romantic comedy Runaway Bride (1999). She has voiced roles in the Toy Story trilogy (1995–2010), Treasure Planet (2002), and Meet the Robinsons (2007). She gained critical attention for playing a dysfunctional mother in the Greta Gerwig directed coming-of-age comedy film Lady Bird (2017) for which she earned Best Supporting Actress nominations for the Academy Award, Actor Award, BAFTA Award, Golden Globe Award, and Critics' Choice Movie Award.

Metcalf made her Broadway debut in 1995, and later won Tony Awards for playing Nora Helmer in the Lucas Hnath play A Doll's House, Part 2 (2017) and a middle aged caretaker attending to the elderly in the Edward Albee play Three Tall Women (2018). She was Tony-nominated for playing a political speechwriter in the David Mamet play November (2008), a neurologist whose life begins to unravel in the Sharr White play The Other Place (2013), Annie Wilkes in the Stephen King adaptation Misery (2016), and Hillary Clinton in the Lucas Hnath play Hillary and Clinton (2019).

On television, she had leading roles in the ABC sitcom The Norm Show (1999–2001), the CBS sitcom The McCarthys (2014–2015), and the HBO comedy series Getting On (2013–2015). She took recurring roles playing Carolyn Bigsby in the ABC mystery-dramedy series Desperate Housewives (2006) and Mary Cooper in the CBS sitcom The Big Bang Theory (2007–2018). She also guest starred in 3rd Rock from the Sun, Frasier, Malcolm in the Middle, Horace and Pete, and Hacks. She played Phyllis Gardner in the Hulu limited series The Dropout (2022).

== Film ==
Year	Title	Role	Notes	Ref.
1978	A Wedding	Maid	Uncredited	
1985	Desperately Seeking Susan	Leslie Glass		
1987	Making Mr. Right	Sandy McCleary		
1988	Candy Mountain	Alice		
1988	Stars and Bars	Melissa		
1988	The Appointments of Dennis Jennings	Emma	Short film	
1988	Miles from Home	Exotic Dancer		
1989	Uncle Buck	Marcie Dahlgren-Frost		
1990	Internal Affairs	Amy Wallace		
1990	Pacific Heights	Stephanie MacDonald		
1991	JFK	Susie Cox		
1992	Mistress	Rachel Landisman		
1993	A Dangerous Woman	Anita Bell		
1994	The Secret Life of Houses	Ann		
1994	Blink	Candice		
1995	Leaving Las Vegas	Mrs. Van Houten		
1995	Toy Story	Jennifer Davis	Voice role	
1996	Dear God	Rebecca Frazen		
1997	U Turn	Bus Station Clerk		
1997	Chicago Cab	Female Ad Exec		
1997	Scream 2	Debbie Salt / Nancy Loomis		
1998	Bulworth	Mimi		
1999	Runaway Bride	Betty Trout	Uncredited	
1999	Toy Story 2	Jennifer Davis	Voice role	
2000	Timecode	Dava Adair	Rehearsal shoot (included in the DVD release)	
2002	Treasure Planet	Sarah Hawkins	Voice role	
2005	Fun with Dick and Jane	Phyllis	Uncredited role	
2006	Steel City	Marianne Karn		
2006	Beer League	Mrs. DeVanzo		
2007	Meet the Robinsons	Dr.Krunklehorn-Robinson	Voice role	
2007	Georgia Rule	Paula Richards		
2008	Stop-Loss	Mrs. Colson		
2010	Toy Story 3	Jennifer Davis	Voice role	
2011	Still Screaming: The Ultimate Scary Movie Retrospective	Herself	Documentary film	
2017	Lady Bird	Marion McPherson		
2019	Toy Story 4	Jennifer Davis	Voice cameo	
2022	Somewhere in Queens	Angela Russo		
2026	Everybody Digs Bill Evans	Mary Evans		
2026	Scream 7	Nancy Loomis	Cameo	

== Television ==
Year	Title	Role	Notes	Ref.
1981	Saturday Night Live	Weekend Update Reporter	Episode: "Jr. Walker & the All-Stars"	
1985	The Execution of Raymond Graham	Carol Graham	Television film	
1986	The Equalizer	Theresa	Episode: "No Conscience"	
1988–1997, 2018	Roseanne	Jackie Harris	Main cast (230 episodes)	
1988	Saturday Night Live	"Laurie Has A Story"	Episode: "Matthew Broderick/The Sugarcubes"	
1995–1996	Duckman	Various voices	Episodes: "Research and Destroy" and "Forbidden Fruit"	
1997	King of the Hill	Cissy Cobb (voice)	Episode: "Peggy the Boggle Champ"	
1997	The Eddie Files	Special Agent Hicks	Episode: "Decimals – The Fake Money Caper"	
1997	Life with Louie	Miss Kinney (voice)	Episode: "The Kiss Is the Thing"	
1997	Dharma & Greg	Spyder	Episode: "Instant Dharma"	
1998	Always Outnumbered	Halley Grimes	Television film	
1998	The Long Island Incident	Carolyn McCarthy	Television film	
1998	3rd Rock from the Sun	Jennifer Ravelli	3 episodes	
1999	Balloon Farm	Casey Johnson	Television film	
1999–2001	The Norm Show	Laurie Freeman	Main cast (54 episodes)	
2000–2011	God, the Devil and Bob	Donna Allman (voice)	13 episodes	
2002	Two Families		Unsold pilot	
2002	Phil at the Gate	Teddy Duffy	Unsold pilot	
2002	Charlie Lawrence	Sarah Dolecek	Main cast (7 episodes)	
2004	Malcolm in the Middle	Susan	Episode: "Lois's Sister"	
2004	Frasier	Nanny G	Episode: "Caught in the Act"	
2004	Absolutely Fabulous	Crystalline	Episode: "White Box"	
2005	Without a Trace	Susan Hopkins	Episode: "A Day in the Life"	
2006	Monk	Cora	Episode: "Mr. Monk Bumps His Head"	
2006	Grey's Anatomy	Beatrice Carver	Episode: "The Name of the Game"	
2006	Desperate Housewives	Carolyn Bigsby	4 episodes	
2006	My Boys	Aunt Phyllis	Episode: "When Heroes Fall from Grace"	
2007	The Virgin of Akron, Ohio	Lydia	Pilot episode	
2007	Raines	Alice Brody	Episode: "Reconstructing Alice"	
2007–2018	The Big Bang Theory	Mary Cooper	Recurring role (14 episodes)	
2008–2009	Easy Money	Bobette Buffkin	Main cast (8 episodes)	
2009	The Farm	Warden Margaret Elder	Unsold pilot	
2013	The Goodwin Games	Dr. Richland	2 episodes	
2013–2015	Getting On	Jenna James	Main cast (18 episodes)	
2014	Tim & Eric's Bedtime Stories	Gabrielle	Episode: "Baby"	
2014–2015	The McCarthys	Marjorie McCarthy	Main cast (15 episodes)	
2016	Horace and Pete	Sarah	Episode #1.3	
2017	Portlandia	Jill	Episode: "Friend Replacement"	
2017	Playing House	Leslie Rollins	Episode: "You Wanna Roll with This"	
2018–2023	American Dad!	Elizabeth Hadley (voice)	3 episodes	
2018	Supergirl	Mary McGowan	Episode: "Schott Through the Heart"	
2018–2025	The Conners	Jackie Harris	Main cast (112 episodes)	
2020–2022	The Accidental Wolf	Ram	3 episodes	
2021	Q-Force	V (voice)	10 episodes	
2021	Chicago Party Aunt	Peg Dunbrowski (voice)	Episode: "Tailgate Jailgate"	
2022	The Dropout	Phyllis Gardner	4 episodes	
2022, 2026	Hacks	Weed	3 episodes	
2023	Carol & the End of the World	HR Lady (voice)	3 episodes	
2024	Elsbeth	Regina Coburn / Felicity Watts	Episode: "Toil and Trouble"	
2025	Monster: The Ed Gein Story	Augusta Gein	Main role	
2026-present	Big Mistakes	Linda	Main role	

== Theater ==
Year	Title	Role	Playwright	Venue	Ref.
1979	The Glass Menagerie	Laura Wingfield	Tennessee Williams	Steppenwolf Theatre, Chicago	
1980	Balm in Gilead	Darlene	Lanford Wilson	Steppenwolf Theatre, Chicago	
1981	Balm in Gilead	Darlene	Lanford Wilson	Apollo Theater Center, Chicago	
1984–85	Balm in Gilead	Darlene	Lanford Wilson	Circle Repertory Theatre	
1985	Coyote Ugly	Scarlet	Lynn Siefert	Steppenwolf Theatre, Chicago	
1985–86	You Can't Take It with You	Gay Wellington	George S. Kaufman; Moss Hart	Steppenwolf Theatre, Chicago	
1986–87	Bodies, Rest and Motion	Beth	Roger Hedden	Mitzi E. Newhouse Theatre, Off-Broadway	
1987	Educating Rita	Susan "Rita" White	Willy Russell	Steppenwolf Theatre, Chicago	
1987	Educating Rita	Susan "Rita" White	Willy Russell	Westside Theatre, Off-Broadway	
1992	My Thing of Love	Elly	Alexandra G. Vassilaros	Steppenwolf Theatre, Chicago	
1994	Libra	Margeurite Oswald / David Ferrie	Don DeLillo; John Malkovich	Steppenwolf Theatre, Chicago	
1995	My Thing of Love	Elly	Alexandra G. Vassilaros	Martin Beck Theatre, Broadway	
1999	The Beauty Queen of Leenane	Maureen Folan	Martin McDonagh	Steppenwolf Theatre, Chicago	
2001	All My Sons	Kate Keller	Arthur Miller	Lyttelton Theatre, West End	
2004	Frankie and Johnny in the Clair de Lune	Frankie	Terrence McNally	Steppenwolf Theatre, Chicago	
2006	All My Sons	Kate Keller	Arthur Miller	Geffen Playhouse, Los Angeles	
2007	The Quality of Life	Jeannette	Jane Anderson	Geffen Playhouse, Los Angeles	
2008	November	Clarice Bernstein	David Mamet	Ethel Barrymore Theatre, Broadway	
2008	The Quality of Life	Jeannette	Jane Anderson	American Conservatory Theater	
2009	Brighton Beach Memoirs	Kate Jerome	Neil Simon	Nederlander Theatre, Broadway	
2009	Voice Lessons	Ginny	Justin Tanner	Zephyr Theatre, Los Angeles	
2010	Voice Lessons	Ginny	Justin Tanner	Studio Theatre, Washington D.C.	
2010	A Lie of the Mind	Meg	Sam Shepard	Acorn Theatre, Off-Broadway	
2010	Detroit	Mary	Lisa D'Amour	Steppenwolf Theatre, Chicago	
2011	The Other Place	Juliana	Sharr White	Lucille Lortel Theatre, Off-Broadway	
2012	Long Day's Journey into Night	Mary Tyrone	Eugene O'Neill	Apollo Theatre, West End	
2012	Long Day's Journey into Night	Mary Tyrone	Eugene O'Neill	Theatre Royal, Glasgow	
2013	The Other Place	Juliana	Sharr White	Samuel J. Friedman Theatre, Broadway	
2013–2014	Domesticated	Judy Pulvar	Bruce Norris	Mitzi E. Newhouse Theatre, Off-Broadway	
2015	Trevor	Sandra Morris	Nick Jones	Atwater Village Theatre, Los Angeles	
2015	All My Sons	Kate Keller	Arthur Miller	John Drew Theatre	
2015–2016	Misery	Annie Wilkes	William Goldman	Broadhurst Theatre, Broadway	
2016	Voice Lessons	Ginny	Justin Tanner	Steppenwolf Theatre, Chicago	
2017	A Doll's House, Part 2	Nora Helmer	Lucas Hnath	John Golden Theatre, Broadway	
2018	Three Tall Women	B	Edward Albee	John Golden Theatre, Broadway	
2019	Hillary and Clinton	Hillary Clinton	Lucas Hnath	John Golden Theatre, Broadway	
2020	Who's Afraid of Virginia Woolf?	Martha	Edward Albee	Booth Theatre, Broadway	
2023	Grey House	Raleigh	Levi Holloway	Lyceum Theatre, Broadway	
2023	Gutenberg! The Musical!	Producer (one night only)	Scott Brown; Anthony King	James Earl Jones Theatre, Broadway	
2024	Little Bear Ridge Road	Sarah	Samuel D. Hunter	Steppenwolf Theatre, Chicago	
2025	Little Bear Ridge Road	Sarah	Samuel D. Hunter	Booth Theater, Broadway	
2026	Death of a Salesman	Linda Loman	Arthur Miller	Winter Garden Theatre, Broadway	
