= List of awards and nominations received by Laurie Metcalf =

Laurie Metcalf awards and nominations
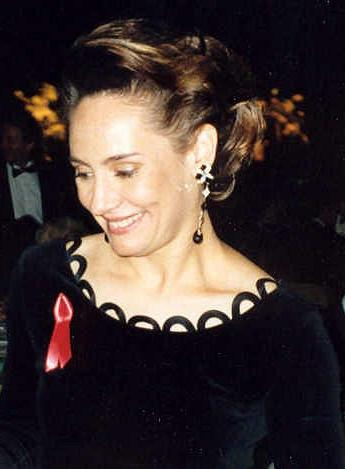
- Metcalf at the 1992 Primetime Emmy Awards
Awards and nominations
Award	Wins	Nominations
Academy Awards	0	1
Actor Awards	0	3
BAFTA Awards	0	1
Critics' Choice Awards	0	5
Emmy Awards	4	14
Golden Globe Awards	0	3
Tony Awards	3	7

Totals (Note: Certain award groups do not simply award one winner. They acknowledge several different recipients, have runners-up, and have third place. Since this is a specific recognition and is different from losing an award, runner-up mentions are considered wins in this award tally. For simplification and to avoid errors, each award in this list has been presumed to have had a prior nomination.)
- Wins: 40
- Nominations: 87

The following is a list of awards and nominations received by Laurie Metcalf.

Laurie Metcalf is an American actress known for her performances on the stage and screen. She has received numerous accolades throughout her career including four Primetime Emmy Awards and three Tony Awards as well as nominations for an Academy Award, British Academy Film Award, three Golden Globe Awards, an Independent Spirit Award, and three Actor Awards.

Metcalf received an Academy Award for Best Supporting Actress nomination for her performance in Greta Gerwig's coming of age film Lady Bird (2017). Her other film work includes Susan Seidelman's Desperately Seeking Susan (1985), John Hughes' comedy Uncle Buck (1989), and Oliver Stone's JFK (1991). She is also known for voicing Mrs. Davis in the acclaimed Toy Story film series.

She is widely known as Jackie Harris on the long running ABC sitcom Roseanne (1988-1997; 2018), winning 3 consecutive Primetime Emmy Awards for Outstanding Supporting Actress in a Comedy Series. and a Primetime Emmy Award for Outstanding Guest Actress in a Comedy Series for Hacks (2022). She was Emmy-nominated for her roles in 3rd Rock from the Sun in 1999, Monk in 2006, Desperate Housewives in 2007, Getting On in 2016, The Big Bang Theory in 2016, Horace and Pete in 2016.

Metcalf is a founding member of the Steppenwolf Theater Company. She later gained acclaim for her extensive work on Broadway. Over her career she has received three Tony Awards for Best Actress in a Play for her role as Nora Helmer in Lucas Hnath's A Doll's House, Part 2 (2017), and Tony Award for Best Featured Actress in a Play for playing a middle aged caretaker in the revival of Edward Albee's Three Tall Women (2018) and in 2026 for the revival of 'Death of a Salesman. She was Tony-nominated for her roles in November (2008), The Other Place (2013), Misery (2016), and Hillary and Clinton (2019).

== Major associations ==
=== Academy Awards ===
Year	Category	Nominated work	Result	Ref.
2017	Best Supporting Actress	Lady Bird	Nominated	

=== Actor Awards ===
Year	Category	Nominated work	Result	Ref.
2007	Outstanding Ensemble in a Comedy Series	Desperate Housewives	Nominated	
2017	Outstanding Actress in a Supporting Role	Lady Bird	Nominated	
2017	Outstanding Ensemble in a Motion Picture	Lady Bird	Nominated	

=== BAFTA Awards ===
Year	Category	Nominated work	Result	Ref.
British Academy Film Awards
2017	Best Actress in a Supporting Role	Lady Bird	Nominated	

=== Critics' Choice Awards ===
Year	Category	Nominated work	Result	Ref.
Critics' Choice Movie Awards
2017	Best Supporting Actress	Lady Bird	Nominated	
2017	Best Acting Ensemble	Lady Bird	Nominated	
Critics' Choice Television Awards
2015	Best Guest Performer in a Comedy Series	The Big Bang Theory	Nominated	
2019	Best Supporting Actress in a Comedy Series	The Conners	Nominated	
Critics' Choice Super Awards
2026	Best Actress in a Horror Series, Limited Series or Made-for-TV Movie	Monster: The Ed Gein Story	Nominated	

=== Emmy Awards ===
Year	Category	Nominated work	Result	Ref.
Primetime Emmy Awards
1992	Outstanding Supporting Actress in a Comedy Series	Roseanne (episode: "Why Jackie Becomes a Trucker")	Won	
1993	Outstanding Supporting Actress in a Comedy Series	Roseanne (episode: "Crime and Punishment")	Won	
1994	Outstanding Supporting Actress in a Comedy Series	Roseanne (episodes: "Labor Day" + "Past Imperfect")	Won	
1995	Outstanding Supporting Actress in a Comedy Series	Roseanne (episodes: "Bed and Bored" + "Single Married Female")	Nominated	
1999	Outstanding Guest Actress in a Comedy Series	3rd Rock from the Sun (season four)	Nominated	
2006	Outstanding Guest Actress in a Comedy Series	Monk (episode: "Mr. Monk Bumps His Head")	Nominated	
2007	Outstanding Guest Actress in a Comedy Series	Desperate Housewives (season three)	Nominated	
2016	Outstanding Guest Actress in a Comedy Series	The Big Bang Theory (episode: "The Convergence Convergence")	Nominated	
2016	Outstanding Lead Actress in a Comedy Series	Getting On (episode: "Am I Still Me?")	Nominated	
2016	Outstanding Guest Actress in a Drama Series	Horace and Pete (episode: "Episode 3")	Nominated	
2018	Outstanding Supporting Actress in a Comedy Series	Roseanne (episode: "No Country for Old Women")	Nominated	
2022	Outstanding Guest Actress in a Comedy Series	Hacks (episode: "Trust the Process")	Won	
2026	Outstanding Guest Actress in a Comedy Series	Hacks (episode: "The Garden")	Nominated	
2026	Outstanding Supporting Actress in a Limited Series or Movie	Monster: The Ed Gein Story	Nominated	

=== Golden Globe Awards ===
Year	Category	Nominated work	Result	Ref.
1993	Best Supporting Actress – Television	Roseanne	Nominated	
1995	Best Supporting Actress – Television	Roseanne	Nominated	
2017	Best Supporting Actress – Motion Picture	Lady Bird	Nominated	

=== Tony Awards ===
Year	Category	Nominated work	Result	Ref.
2008	Best Featured Actress in a Play	November	Nominated	
2013	Best Actress in a Play	The Other Place	Nominated	
2016	Best Actress in a Play	Misery	Nominated	
2017	Best Actress in a Play	A Doll's House, Part 2	Won	
2018	Best Featured Actress in a Play	Three Tall Women	Won	
2019	Best Actress in a Play	Hillary and Clinton	Nominated	
2026	Best Featured Actress in a Play	Death of a Salesman	Won	

== Miscellaneous awards ==
Award	Year	Category	Nominated work	Result	Ref.
Independent Spirit Awards	2017	Best Supporting Female	Lady Bird	Nominated	
Satellite Awards	2017	Best Supporting Actress – Motion Picture	Lady Bird	Nominated	

== Theater awards ==
Award	Year	Category	Nominated work	Result	Ref.
Broadway.com Audience Awards	2024	Favorite Leading Actress in a Play	Grey House	Nominated	
Dorian Award	2026	Outstanding Lead Performance in a Broadway Play	Little Bear Ridge Road	Nominated	
Dorian Award	2026	Outstanding Featured Performance in a Broadway Play	Death of a Salesman	Nominated	
Drama Desk Awards	2011	Outstanding Leading Actress in a Play	The Other Place	Nominated	
Drama Desk Awards	2014	Outstanding Leading Actress in a Play	Domesticated	Nominated	
Drama Desk Awards	2017	Outstanding Leading Actress in a Play	A Doll's House, Part 2	Nominated	
Drama Desk Awards	2018	Outstanding Leading Actress in a Play	Three Tall Women	Nominated	
Drama Desk Awards	2019	Outstanding Leading Actress in a Play	Hillary and Clinton	Nominated	
Drama Desk Awards	2026	Outstanding Lead Performance in a Play	Death of a Salesman	Nominated	
Drama League Awards	2011	Distinguished Performance	The Other Place	Nominated	
Drama League Awards	2014	Distinguished Performance	Domesticated	Nominated	
Drama League Awards	2017	Distinguished Performance	A Doll's House, Part 2	Nominated	
Drama League Awards	2018	Distinguished Performance	Three Tall Women	Nominated	
Drama League Awards	2019	Distinguished Performance	Hillary and Clinton	Nominated	
Drama League Awards	2026	Distinguished Performance	Death of a Salesman and Little Bear Ridge Road	Nominated	
Obie Awards	1985	Distinguished Performance by an Actress	Balm in Gilead	Won	
Obie Awards	2010	Distinguished Performance by an Actress	A Lie of the Mind	Won	
Obie Awards	2011	Distinguished Performance by an Actress	The Other Place	Won	
Lucille Lortel Awards	2010	Outstanding Featured Actress in a Play	A Lie of the Mind	Nominated	
Lucille Lortel Awards	2011	Outstanding Lead Actress in a Play	The Other Place	Won	
Lucille Lortel Awards	2014	Outstanding Lead Actress in a Play	Domesticated	Nominated	
Outer Critics Circle Awards	2011	Outstanding Actress in a Play	The Other Place	Nominated	
Outer Critics Circle Awards	2017	Outstanding Actress in a Play	A Doll's House, Part 2	Nominated	
Outer Critics Circle Awards	2018	Outstanding Featured Actress in a Play	Three Tall Women	Won	
Outer Critics Circle Awards	2026	Outstanding Featured Performer in a Broadway Play	Death of a Salesman	Won	
Theatre World Awards	1985	Outstanding Stage Debut	Balm in Gilead	Won	

== Critics awards ==
Year	Award	Category	Nominated work	Result|
2017	Boston Society of Film Critics	Best Supporting Actress	Lady Bird	Won
2017	Central Ohio Film Critics Association	Best Supporting Actress	Lady Bird	Won
2017	Chicago Film Critics Association	Best Supporting Actress	Lady Bird	Won
2017	Georgia Film Critics Association	Best Supporting Actress	Lady Bird	Won
2017	Indiana Film Journalists Association	Best Supporting Actress	Lady Bird	Won
2017	Iowa Film Critics Association	Best Supporting Actress	Lady Bird	Won
2017	Kansas City Film Critics Circle	Best Supporting Actress	Lady Bird	Won
2017	Las Vegas Film Critics Society	Best Supporting Actress	Lady Bird	Won
2017	Los Angeles Film Critics Association	Best Supporting Actress	Lady Bird	Won
2017	National Board of Review	Best Supporting Actress	Lady Bird	Won
2017	National Society of Film Critics	Best Supporting Actress	Lady Bird	Won
2017	North Carolina Film Critics Association	Best Supporting Actress	Lady Bird	Won
2017	Oklahoma Film Critics Circle	Best Supporting Actress	Lady Bird	Won
2017	Online Film Critics Society	Best Supporting Actress	Lady Bird	Won
2017	San Diego Film Critics Society	Best Supporting Actress	Lady Bird	Won
2017	San Francisco Film Critics Circle	Best Supporting Actress	Lady Bird	Won
2017	Seattle Film Critics Society	Best Supporting Actress	Lady Bird	Won
2017	Southeastern Film Critics Association	Best Supporting Actress	Lady Bird	Won
2017	St. Louis Film Critics Association	Best Supporting Actress	Lady Bird	Won
2017	Toronto Film Critics Association	Best Supporting Actress	Lady Bird	Won
2017	Vancouver Film Critics Circle	Best Supporting Actress	Lady Bird	Won
2017	Washington D.C. Area Film Critics Association	Best Supporting Actress	Lady Bird	Won
2017	Dallas-Fort Worth Film Critics Association	Best Supporting Actress	Lady Bird	Runner-up
2017	Denver Film Critics Society	Best Supporting Actress	Lady Bird	Nominated
2017	Detroit Film Critics Society	Best Supporting Actress	Lady Bird	Nominated
2017	Florida Film Critics Circle	Best Supporting Actress	Lady Bird	Nominated
