= Laurie Metcalf =

American actress (born 1955)

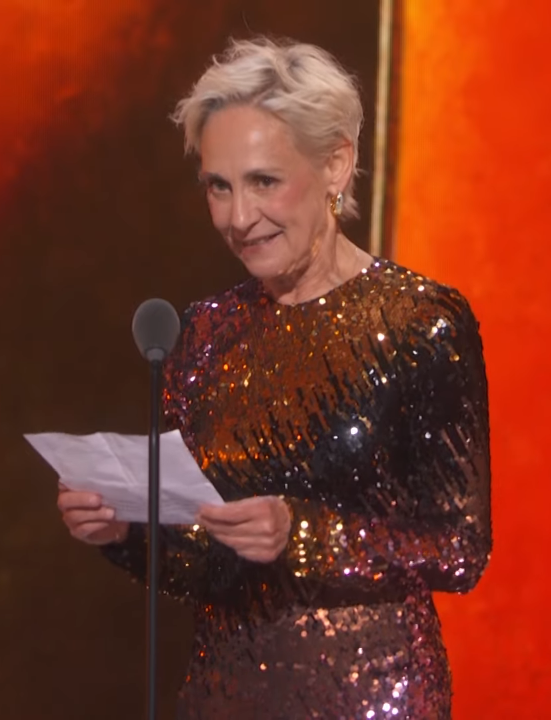
- Metcalf at the 2026 Tony Awards
- Born: Laura Elizabeth Metcalf; June 16, 1955 (age 71); Carbondale, Illinois, U.S.
- Education: Illinois State University (BA)
- Occupations: Actress; comedian
- Years active: 1974–present
- Works: Full list
- Spouses: Jeff Perry (m. 1983; div. 1986); Matt Roth (m. 2005; div. 2014)
- Children: 4, including Zoe
- Relatives: Zoe Akins (great-aunt); Hugo Rumbold (great-uncle)
- Awards: Full list

Laura Elizabeth "Laurie" Metcalf (born June 16, 1955) is an American actress and comedian. Known for her complex and versatile roles across the stage and screen, she has received various accolades throughout a career spanning more than four decades, including four Primetime Emmy Awards and three Tony Awards, in addition to nominations for an Academy Award, a British Academy Film Award, and three Golden Globe Awards.

Metcalf began her career with the Steppenwolf Theatre Company and frequently works in Chicago theatre. She made her Broadway debut in the 1995 play My Thing of Love. She went on to receive three Tony Awards, her first for Best Actress in a Play for her role in A Doll's House, Part 2 (2017) followed by her wins for Best Featured Actress in a Play for the revivals of Edward Albee's Three Tall Women (2018) and Arthur Miller's Death of a Salesman (2026). She was also Tony-nominated for November (2008), The Other Place (2010), Misery (2016), and Hillary and Clinton (2019).

On television, she played Jackie Harris on Roseanne (1988–1997, 2018), for which she won three Primetime Emmy Awards for Outstanding Supporting Actress in a Comedy Series, and its spinoff The Conners (2018–2025). She also won an Emmy Award for her guest role in Hacks (2022), and was Emmy-nominated for 3rd Rock from the Sun (1999), Monk (2006), Desperate Housewives (2007), The Big Bang Theory (2007-2018), Getting On (2013–2015), and Horace and Pete (2016). She also acted in The Norm Show (1999–2001), Frasier, and The Dropout (2022)

In film, Metcalf gained critical acclaim for her portrayal of a pragmatic yet caring mother in Greta Gerwig's coming-of-age film Lady Bird (2017). The role earned her nominations for the Academy Award, BAFTA Award, Golden Globe Award, Actor Award, and Critics' Choice Award for Best Supporting Actress. From 1995 to 2019, she voiced Andy's mom in the Toy Story film series and Sarah Hawkins in Treasure Planet (2002). She also acted in Desperately Seeking Susan (1985), Uncle Buck (1989), JFK (1991), Georgia Rule (2007) and Scream 2 (1997).

== Early life and education ==
Metcalf was raised in Edwardsville, Illinois, which she has said "isn't anywhere near a theatre." Her father, James, was the budget director at Southern Illinois University-Edwardsville at the time of his sudden death in 1984. Her mother, Libby, was a librarian. Her great-aunt was the Pulitzer Prize-winning playwright Zoë Akins.

Metcalf is an alumna of Illinois State University, class of 1976. Metcalf worked as a secretary while in college and has said that she enjoyed seeing a pile of paper in the to-do box on one side of her desk move over to the completed side by the end of the day. She was often so focused on her work she missed lunch. She originally majored in German, thinking she could work as an interpreter, and then in anthropology before majoring in theatre. She has said that theatre work also involves interpreting and studying human behavior. She has described herself as hideously shy, and yet she found the courage to audition for a few plays in high school and was "hooked". She initially did not choose acting as a career, because it was unlikely to lead to regular work.

== Career ==
=== 1976–1987: Rise to prominence ===
Metcalf attended Illinois State University and earned her Bachelor of Arts in Theater in 1976. While at ISU, she met fellow theater students, among them John Malkovich, Glenne Headly, Joan Allen, Terry Kinney, and Jeff Perry, the latter two of whom, along with Perry's high school classmate Gary Sinise, went on to establish Chicago's Steppenwolf Theatre Company. Metcalf began her professional career at Steppenwolf, of which she was a charter member. Metcalf went to New York to appear in an Off-Broadway Steppenwolf production of Balm in Gilead at Circle Repertory in 1984 for which she received the 1984 Obie Award for Best Actress and a 1984–85 Theatre World Award (for best debut in a Broadway or Off-Broadway performance). Metcalf was praised for her performance as Darlene, and was specifically singled out for her 20-minute act two monologue. Chicago critic Richard Christiansen stated:

There's a moment when Laurie Metcalf—who plays this poor young thing that comes to the big city and hangs out at this greasy spoon diner where the play is set—is talking about her once boyfriend who is an albino; I think it's a monologue of about five, six, seven minutes. Just to sit there and watch and hear Laurie unspool that story, it just brought tears coming down your eyes—oh, boy, it was something.

Metcalf has appeared in several television series, including being a cast member for a single episode of Saturday Night Live—the final episode of the show's tumultuous 1980–1981 season. In 1981, she appeared as a feature player on the first Dick Ebersol-produced episode of Saturday Night Live following the firing of Jean Doumanian. She appeared in a Weekend Update segment about taking a bullet for the president of the United States. Because of the sketch show's perceived severe decline in quality at the time and the 1981 Writers Guild of America strike, the show was put on hiatus for retooling. Metcalf was not asked to return as a cast member the following year.

Metcalf's first on-screen appearance was an uncredited role as a maid in Robert Altman's comedy A Wedding (1978). During the 1980s, Metcalf performed supporting roles in many popular films, including the Susan Seidelman comedies Desperately Seeking Susan (1985) and Making Mr. Right (1987), Gary Sinise's drama Miles from Home (1988), the Pat O'Connor comedy Stars and Bars (1988), and John Hughes' comedy film Uncle Buck (1989).

=== 1988–1998: Roseanne and recognition ===
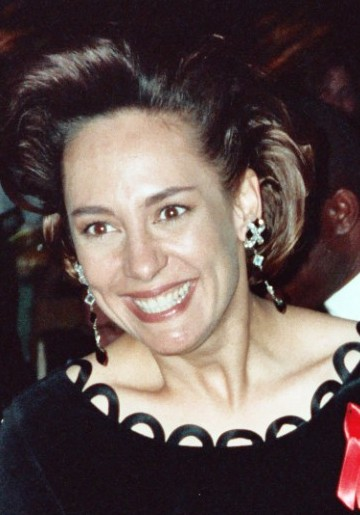
Metcalf at the 1992 Emmy Awards

In 1988, Metcalf became widely known for her role as Jackie Harris, the multiple-careered, low self-esteemed, amiable sister of the title character in the hit ABC sitcom series Roseanne, starring alongside Roseanne Barr and John Goodman. Her performance garnered four Primetime Emmy Award nominations for Outstanding Supporting Actress in a Comedy Series, a category that she won three consecutive times, from 1992 to 1994. Roseanne ran through 1997; Metcalf appeared as Jackie over the show's entire nine-season run.

Throughout the 1990s, she played against type in a series of darker films, such as the John Schlesinger psychological thriller Pacific Heights (1990), Mike Figgis's thriller Internal Affairs (1990), the Hollywood dramedy Mistress (1992), the romantic drama A Dangerous Woman (1993), Michael Apted's neo-noir thriller Blink (1994), and reuniting with Figgis in his Oscar-winning drama Leaving Las Vegas (1995). She also played minor roles in Warren Beatty's political drama Bulworth (1998) and the Garry Marshall romantic comedy Runaway Bride (1999).

Her biggest film role of the decade was as Susie Cox, one of Jim Garrison's chief investigators, in Oliver Stone's historical epic JFK (1991). During this time, she also had a series of guest-starring roles on shows such as Duckman (1995–1996), King of the Hill (1997), Life with Louie (1997), Dharma & Greg (1997), and 3rd Rock from the Sun (1998), the last of which brought her first Primetime Emmy Award nomination for Outstanding Guest Actress in a Comedy Series.

=== 1999–2007: Established actress ===
From 1999 to 2001, Metcalf costarred with Norm Macdonald on The Norm Show (later known as Norm), which ran for three seasons (1999–2001), and later starred opposite Nathan Lane in the 2003 comedy series Charlie Lawrence, which was cancelled after the airing of two episodes. In 2008, Metcalf starred in The CW dramedy Easy Money, as the matriarch of a family of loan sharks. The series was canceled after three episodes. Through this period, Metcalf had guest-starring roles on series such as Absolutely Fabulous, Malcolm in the Middle (as Susan Welker, Lois' younger sister), My Boys, Frasier, Portlandia, Without a Trace, and Grey's Anatomy, the last of which she played opposite her ex-husband Jeff Perry. Her work on the Tony Shalhoub-led Monk and the ABC ensemble comedy drama Desperate Housewives earned her a further two Primetime Emmy Award nominations for Outstanding Guest Actress in a Comedy Series.

Metcalf voiced Andy's mother in the Disney-Pixar animated film Toy Story (1995), reprising the role in Toy Story 2 (1999), Toy Story 3 (2010), and Toy Story 4 (2019). All four films were huge financial and critical successes, grossing well over a collective billion dollars. In 1997, she portrayed Debbie Salt in the horror film Scream 2. She made a brief foray into television films in the late 1990s, portraying the real-life gun control activist Carolyn McCarthy in the NBC film The Long Island Incident (1998).

In the 2000s, Metcalf became known mostly for her voice work in film. In 2002, she voiced Sarah Hawkins in the Disney animated Treasure Planet (2002). Despite the film receiving positive reviews, the film was a financial box office failure. In 2007, she voiced Lucille Krunklehorn-Robinson in the Disney animated film Meet the Robinsons. The film, like Treasure Planet, was met with mixed reviews. A. O. Scott of The New York Times wrote: "Meet the Robinsons is surely one of the worst theatrically released animated features issued under the Disney label in quite some time". Metcalf did not feature in many live action films during this period but she did appear in the raunchy comedy Beer League (2006), the Jim Carrey-led comedy remake Fun with Dick and Jane (2005), the coming-of-age drama Georgia Rule (2006) with Jane Fonda and Lindsay Lohan, and the war drama Stop Loss (2008) with Ryan Phillippe, Channing Tatum and Joseph Gordon-Levitt.

In 2007, Metcalf made her first appearance as Mary Cooper, the mother of Sheldon Cooper, one of the main characters, on the CBS sitcom The Big Bang Theory. She reprised the role repeatedly over its twelve-season run, and in 2016, her performance earned Metcalf her fourth nomination for the Primetime Emmy Award for Outstanding Guest Actress in a Comedy Series. Her daughter, Zoe Perry portrayed a younger version of Mary in the spinoff prequel series Young Sheldon.

=== 2008–2019: Broadway roles and Lady Bird ===
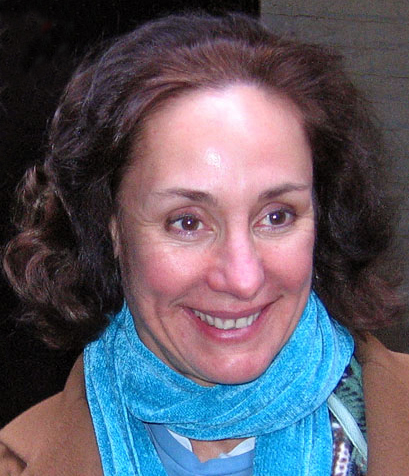
Metcalf after a performance of November in 2008

Metcalf ultimately relocated to New York City and began to work in theatrical productions such as David Mamet's November on Broadway in 2008, for which she received a Tony Award nomination. In June 2009, Metcalf starred in Justin Tanner's play Voice Lessons with French Stewart in Hollywood before beginning rehearsals to play Kate Jerome in the Broadway revival of Neil Simon's semi-autobiographical plays Brighton Beach Memoirs and Broadway Bound, directed by David Cromer. The former production's run, however, lasted for nine performances in October 2009, and the latter was canceled before opening. Voice Lessons, with its original cast intact, went on to run three more times — one Off-Broadway in May 2010, another in Hollywood in May 2011, and another in Chicago in May 2016. In September 2010, Metcalf returned to Steppenwolf and starred in Lisa D'Amour's play Detroit. In 2011, she appeared in the Off-Broadway play The Other Place by Sharr White, directed by Joe Mantello. She won the 2011 Lucille Lortel Award, Outstanding Lead Actress, and the 2011 Obie Award, for her performance.

In 2012, Metcalf joined David Suchet in a West End production of Eugene O'Neill's Long Day's Journey into Night, for which she was nominated for the Evening Standard Theatre Award for Best Actress. In 2013, The Other Place transferred to Broadway with Metcalf reprising her role and earning Tony and Drama League nominations. She starred with her real-life daughter, Zoe Perry. In 2013, Metcalf starred in Bruce Norris's Off-Broadway play Domesticated with Jeff Goldblum at the Mitzi Newhouse Theater of Lincoln Center. She was nominated for the 2014 Drama League Award, Distinguished Performance and the 2014 Drama Desk Award for Outstanding Actress in a Play for her performance.

From 2013 to 2015, Metcalf starred in the HBO comedy series Getting On. She was nominated for the Primetime Emmy Award for Outstanding Lead Actress in a Comedy Series for its final season, losing to Julia Louis-Dreyfus of Veep. She was also the lead actress in the short-lived CBS family sitcom The McCarthys (2014–15). In 2015, she took the role of Annie Wilkes in the Broadway production of Stephen King's Misery, opposite Bruce Willis. The play premiered on November 15, 2015, at the Broadhurst Theatre. It received mixed reviews from critics, but Metcalf's performance was widely acclaimed. She was nominated for the Tony Award for Best Actress in a Play, her third Tony nomination overall.

In 2016, Metcalf took a dramatic turn in the third episode of Louis C.K.'s self-funded show Horace and Pete, for which she was nominated for the Primetime Emmy Award for Outstanding Guest Actress in a Drama Series. Matt Brenann of IndieWire praised Metcalf's performance: "Metcalf's inflections and expressions [are the narrative's] central characters; C.K.'s unflinching direction drinks her performance to the lees, to the point that Sarah's recollection of an afternoon sunbathing bristles with suspense, approaching the edge of some invisible precipice." On April 28, 2017, it was announced that a revival of Roseanne was in the works and that Metcalf along with most of the original cast and some of the producers would return for the limited series that was being shopped around with ABC and Netflix the frontrunners to land the show. On May 16, 2017, producers confirmed that eight episodes would air mid-season in 2018 on ABC. On May 29, 2018, in the wake of racist remarks by Barr posted on Twitter regarding former president Barack Obama's advisor Valerie Jarrett, ABC cancelled the revival after a single season. Metcalf reprised her role in The Conners, a spinoff of Roseanne without Barr's involvement which premiered in fall 2018. In 2018, Metcalf's portrayal of Jackie Harris earned a fifth Primetime Emmy Award for Outstanding Supporting Actress in a Comedy Series nomination for her work on the revival of Roseanne. The show had a seven season run before concluding on April 23, 2025.

Metcalf appeared on Broadway in Lucas Hnath's A Doll's House, Part 2 with Chris Cooper at the John Golden Theatre. which opened in April 2017. She received critical acclaim for her performance and she won her first Tony Award. In 2017, Metcalf received universal critical acclaim for her performance as tough-loving mother Marion McPherson in Greta Gerwig's coming-of-age film Lady Bird starring alongside Saoirse Ronan and Tracy Letts. For her performance, she was nominated for numerous awards, including the Academy Award, Golden Globe, SAG, BAFTA, Critics' Choice and the Independent Spirit Award. In 2018, Metcalf performed in the Broadway revival of Three Tall Women with Glenda Jackson and Allison Pill at the John Golden Theatre in 2018. She won her second consecutive Tony Award. The following year, Metcalf played Hillary Clinton opposite John Lithgow as Bill Clinton in Lucas Hnath's Hillary and Clinton on Broadway, again at the John Golden Theatre. The play was directed by Joe Mantello and tells a fictional account of Hillary Clinton's 2008 presidential campaign. It ran April 18, 2019 through June 23, 2019. Metcalf was nominated for the Tony Award for Best Actress in a Play.

=== 2020–present ===
In 2020, Metcalf began performances in the Broadway revival of Edward Albee's Who's Afraid of Virginia Woolf? playing Martha. The production was directed by Joe Mantello and Metcalf starred alongside Rupert Everett. The play ran at the Booth Theatre from March 3, 2020, to March 11, 2020. The production was cancelled due to the COVID-19 pandemic with no planned return date. In 2022, she portrayed Phyllis Gardner in the Hulu limited series The Dropout starring Amanda Seyfried as Elizabeth Holmes. That same year, she appeared as burned-out tour manager Weed in the HBO Max comedy series Hacks (2022) for which she won the Primetime Emmy Award for Outstanding Guest Actress in a Comedy Series. Metcalf returned to Broadway in April 2023 in the play Grey House, which ran until July 30, 2023. Metcalf costarred in Ray Romano's directorial debut Somewhere in Queens (2023).

She originated the lead role in the 2024 play Little Bear Ridge Road. She subsequently starred in the 2026 Broadway revival of Arthur Miller's Death of a Salesman opposite Nathan Lane, Christopher Abbott, and Ben Ahlers. The production was directed by Joe Mantello and played at the Winter Garden Theatre for a 22-week engagement, with previews beginning March 6, 2026, opening night on April 9, and closing night on August 9. She won her third Tony Award for the production. Metcalf joined the cast of Dan Levy's 2026 Netflix series Big Mistakes, playing the mother of "two deeply incapable siblings (Levy, Taylor Ortega) who are blackmailed into the world of organized crime."

== Personal life ==
In 1983, Metcalf married Jeff Perry, co-founding member of Steppenwolf Theatre Company; the two had a daughter, Zoe Perry, in 1983. They divorced in 1986.

Metcalf later began a relationship with Matt Roth, the Roseanne co-star who played her abusive boyfriend Fisher. By November 1993, they had a son and eventually married in 2005. They also worked together on occasion, including in the 1994 feature film thriller Blink and the 1998 drama Chicago Cab; they also appeared together in an episode of Desperate Housewives. Their daughter, Mae Roth, was born in 2005. They became parents to a second son, whom they fostered at six years old in 2006 and later adopted. On November 26, 2008, Metcalf and Roth separated. In September 2011, Roth filed for divorce, citing irreconcilable differences. In May 2014, the divorce was finalized.

Metcalf has described herself as a workaholic and stated that she is hard on herself during rehearsals. She has said that she prefers theatre over other acting media as it is where she feels most comfortable.

She has also appeared in commercials for Plan USA, a humanitarian organization that helps children in need around the world.

== Acting credits and accolades ==
Over her career she has received several accolades including four Primetime Emmy Awards for her roles as Jackie Harris in the ABC sitcom Roseanne in 1992, 1993, 1994, and Weed, an eccentric touring manager in the HBO comedy series Hacks in 2022. For her role as an abrasive mother in Greta Gerwig's coming-of-age film Lady Bird (2017), earning nominations for the Academy Award, a BAFTA Award, and Golden Globe Awards. On stage, she has received three Tony Awards for Best Actress in a Play playing Nora Helmer in the Lucas Hnath play A Doll's House, Part 2 (2017), Best Featured Actress in a Play for her role in the Edward Albee revival Three Tall Women (2018) and Best Featured Actress in a Play for her role in Death Of A Salesman (2026)
