= List of awards and nominations received by Joe Mantello =

List of Joe Mantello awards
Award	Wins	Nominations
Tony Awards	3	9
Emmy Awards	0	1

Joe Mantello is an American actor and director of projects on the stage and screen.

Mantello made his acting debut on Broadway in Tony Kushner's Angels in America: Millennium Approaches (1993) and Angels in America: Perestroika (1994) for which he earned a Tony Award for Best Featured Actor in a Play nomination. He also acted in the revival of Larry Kramer's The Normal Heart in 2011 and Tennessee Williams's The Glass Menagerie in 2017. He is also known for directing both comedic and dramatic plays and musicals on the Broadway stage including Wicked (2003), Glengarry Glen Ross (2005), 9 to 5 (2009), The Humans (2016), Three Tall Women and The Boys in the Band (both 2018). He has received eight Tony Award nominations winning twice for Best Direction of a Play for Take Me Out in 2003 and Best Direction of a Musical for Assassins in 2005. For his work in theatre he also received two Drama Desk Awards, a Drama League Award and two Outer Critics Circle Awards.

For his acting work in television he earned Primetime Emmy Award and Critics' Choice Television Award nominations for his performance as Mickey Marcus in the HBO television film The Normal Heart (2014). He also appeared in Ryan Murphy's limited series Hollywood (2020). That same year he directed the Netflix film Boys in the Band (2020).

== Major associations ==
=== Tony Awards ===
Year	Category	Nominated work	Result	Ref.
1993	Best Featured Actor in a Play	Angels in America: Millennium Approaches	Nominated	
1995	Best Direction of a Play	Love! Valour! Compassion!	Nominated	
2003	Best Direction of a Play	Take Me Out	Won	
2004	Best Direction of a Musical	Assassins	Won	
2005	Best Direction of a Play	Glengarry Glenn Ross	Nominated	
2011	Best Actor in a Play	The Normal Heart	Nominated	
2016	Best Direction of a Play	The Humans	Nominated	
2018	Best Direction of a Play	Three Tall Women	Nominated	
2026	Best Direction of a Play	Death of a Salesman	Won	

=== Emmy Awards ===
Year	Category	Nominated work	Result	Ref.
Primetime Emmy Awards
2014	Outstanding Supporting Actor in a Limited or Anthology Series or Movie	The Normal Heart	Nominated	

== Theatre awards ==
=== Drama Desk Awards ===
Year	Category	Nominated work	Result	Ref.
1993	Outstanding Featured Actor in a Play	Angels in America: Millennium Approaches	Won	
1995	Outstanding Director of a Play	Love! Valour! Compassion!	Nominated	
1998	Outstanding Director of a Play	Mizlansky/Zilinsky or 'Schmucks'	Nominated	
2003	Outstanding Director of a Play	Take Me Out	Nominated	
2003	Outstanding Director of a Musical	A Man of No Importance	Nominated	
2004	Outstanding Director of a Musical	Wicked	Won	
2004	Outstanding Director of a Musical	Assassins	Nominated	
2005	Outstanding Director of a Play	Glengarry Glenn Ross	Nominated	
2009	Outstanding Director of a Musical	9 to 5	Nominated	
2016	Outstanding Director of a Play	The Humans	Nominated	
2018	Outstanding Director of a Play	Three Tall Women	Nominated	
2026	Outstanding Director of a Play	Death of a Salesman	Won	

=== Drama League Awards ===
Year	Category	Nominated work	Result	Ref.
2013	Excellence in Directing		Won	
2018	Outstanding Revival	Three Tall Women	Nominated	
2026	Outstanding Direction of a Play	Death of a Salesman	Won	

=== Outer Critics Circle Awards ===
Year	Category	Nominated work	Result	Ref.
1992	Outstanding Debut Performance	The Baltimore Waltz	Nominated	
1995	Outstanding Director of a Play	Love! Valour! Compassion!	Won	
2003	Outstanding Director of a Play	Take Me Out	Won	
2004	Outstanding Director of a Musical	Wicked	Won	
2005	Outstanding Director of a Play	Glengarry Glenn Ross	Nominated	
2011	Outstanding Actor in a Play	The Normal Heart	Nominated	
2016	Outstanding Direction of a Play	The Humans	Nominated	
2018	Outstanding Direction of a Play	Three Tall Women	Nominated	
2026	Outstanding Direction of a Play	Death of a Salesman	Won	
