= Tanya Berezin =

American actress (1941–2023)

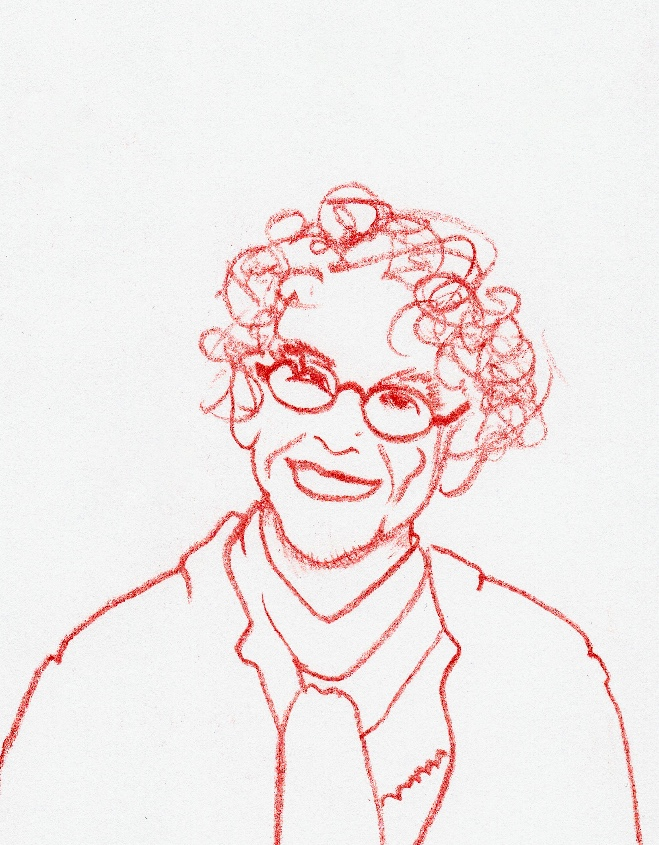
- Born: March 25, 1941; Philadelphia, Pennsylvania, U.S.
- Died: November 29, 2023 (aged 82); San Francisco, California, U.S.
- Occupations: Actress, teacher, artistic director
- Years active: 1960–2023
- Known for: a founder and an artistic director of Circle Repertory Company

Tanya Berezin (March 25, 1941 – November 29, 2023) was an American actress, co-founder and an artistic director of Circle Repertory Company in New York City, and educator. She performed on Broadway and Off-Broadway, and also appeared in a number of films and television series.

== Early life and education ==
Berezin was born in Philadelphia, Pennsylvania on March 25, 1941. She attended Boston University College of Fine Arts, where her roommate was Faye Dunaway. In the 1960s she trained with acting teacher, Jim Tuttle, in the Meisner Technique. In 1963, she arrived in New York and began performing.

While performing in summer stock she met and married Rob Thirkield, who introduced her to experimental theaters in New York, including La MaMa Experimental Theatre Club and Caffe Cino. Thirkield also introduced her to two others would play important roles in her life, Marshall W. Mason and Lanford Wilson. She was divorced from Thirkield in 1977, and she married actor Mark Wilson in 1987.

At La Mama in the 1960s she appeared in several plays, including Lanford Wilson's first full-length play, Rimers of Eldrige, which was directed by the author, and also featured Michael Warren Powell; and Spring Play, by William M. Hoffman, which also featured Harvey Keitel; and The Sand Castle, or There is a Tavern in the Town, or Harry can Dance, also by Lanford Wilson, and directed by Marshall Mason.

== Circle Repertory Company ==
In 1969, Berezin co-founded the Circle Repertory Company, along with Wilson, Mason, and Thirkield. It began (as the Circle Theater Company) in a loft on Broadway on the Upper West Side of Manhattan. Thirkield, an heir to the Thomas Leeming Company (a pharmaceutical company), contributed generously to support Circle Rep until his death in July 1986.

The theatre has helped to develop many actors, directors, and playwrights. While she was artistic director from 1987–94, the theatre premiered plays written by Craig Lucas, Larry Kramer, Paula Vogel, and Jon Robin Baitz, among others. As artistic director of Circle Rep Berezin produced Lanford Wilson’s Redwood Curtain, and Pulitzer Prize winning playwright Paula Vogel’s first play, The Baltimore Waltz; Vogel described that experience, and said "I would not exist if it weren't for Tanya Berezin."

Describing the role of an artistic director, she has said,

“An artistic director basically does two things. One is giving careful attention to each project, finding the right director for the play and having some idea of casting...The other part is having the vision to know that someone might be a really exciting playwright four or five years from now and giving him or her the platform now - to invest in someone, to take chances.”

She was devoted to Circle Rep's “Lab” — a protected artistic workshop environment, based on Caffe Cino, where playwrights, actors and directors would experiment and develop. The company moved in 1974 to Sheridan Square in Greenwich Village, New York. It began there with a production of Tennessee Williams' first full-length play, Battle of Angels, which starred Berezin. Reviewing that production in The New York Times, Walter Kerr wrote,

"Miss Berezin is a revelation...The apparent contradictions of the role bleed into one another so subtly that you are not quite aware of the moment that this caged soul comes whole; but the whole person comes, ferocious, straight-laced, jealous, grateful ... There is scarcely a finer performance in New York just now."

== Acting career ==
=== Stage ===
Broadway

As an actress she appeared on Broadway in As Is by William M. Hoffman; and in plays by Lanford Wilson: Angels Fall, and Fifth of July.

Of her performance in Landord Wilson's play Angels Fall, New York magazine said, "Tanya Berezin does a dazzling balancing act with superiority and edginess as the older woman to whom age brings both wisdom and insecurity; her performance is both lancet and whatever poultice there may be."

Off-Broadway

Her Off-Broadway appearances include Sympathetic Magic, The Mound Builders, Balm in Gilead, Battle of Angels, Serenading Louie, Caligua, The Beaver Coat, Mary Stuart, and other productions. Harold Clurman, reviewing Friedrich Schiller’s play Mary Stuart in The Nation said that a special note of praise was due "for Tanya Berezin as Queen Elizabeth, particularly in the moments of her steely calculations, dark resentments and self-determined and regal loneliness," and that her Queen Elizabeth was "depicted with incisive psychological understanding". In 1976, she won an Obie Award for her role in the premier production of Lanford Wilson's play The Mound Builders.

=== Screen ===
Film

In theatrical film, Berezin appeared in the films A Little Sex (1982), Awakenings (1990), and He Said, She Said (1991).

Television

On television, Berezin had a recurring role as Constance on St. Elsewhere (1985–1988). She has made guest appearances on shows such as The Equalizer (1986), and Spenser: For Hire (1987). Berezin had two recurring Trial Judge roles on Law & Order alternately as Rosalyn Lenz and Janine Pate (1991–2004), as well as guest starring in Law & Order: Special Victims Unit (2000), and Law & Order: Criminal Intent (2002).

== Teaching and coaching ==
In 1994, Berezin began teaching and coaching actors for theatre, film, and television.

== Death ==
Berezin died of lung cancer in San Francisco, California on November 29, 2023, at the age of 82.

== Filmography ==
Tanya Berezin film and television credits
Year	Title	Role	Notes	Ref.
1982	A Little Sex	Joyce	Theatrical film	
1985–1988	St. Elsewhere	Constance	4 episodes	
1986	The Equalizer	Secretary	Episode: "Nocturne"	
1987	Spenser: For Hire	Dr. Dartman	1 episode	
1990	Awakenings	Psychiatrist	Theatrical film	
1991	He Said, She Said	Mrs. Bryer	Theatrical film	
1991–2001	Law & Order	Trial Judge Rosalyn Lenz	3 episodes	
1993–2004	Law & Order	Trial Judge Janine Pate	5 episodes	
2000	Law & Order: Special Victims Unit	Professor Halbersham	Episode: "Honor" (S2.E2)	
2002	Law & Order: Criminal Intent	Lenore Hirschman	1 episode	
