= Sharr White =

American dramatist

- Born: Frederick, Maryland, U.S.
- Education: San Francisco State University (BFA); American Conservatory Theater (MFA)
- Occupations: Playwright, screenwriter

Sharr White is an American playwright and screenwriter. He's known for his Broadway plays The Other Place (2011), The Snow Geese (2013), and Pictures From Home (2023). He's also known as a producer and writer for Showtime series The Affair (2015–2019), the Starz series Sweetbitter (2019), the HBO Max series Genera+ion (2021), and the Netflix limited series Halston (2021).

His plays have also been produced at several regional venues, including at South Coast Repertory, Actors Theatre of Louisville, Oregon Shakespeare Festival, Lincoln Center Theatre's Directors Lab and Key West Theatre Festival.

== Career ==
Iris Fields was developed at the Lincoln Center Theatre Directors Lab and performed at the Key West Theatre Festival in 1996. The Sun-Sentinel reviewer wrote: "The best-directed and -acted show in the festival, Sharr White's drama is about the devastating effects of the Civil War on a Midwestern family... director Joan McGillis shepherds the actors past most of the cracks in White's still-nascent script. Style and structure need much work, but the exciting potential is undeniable."

White's play Six Years received its world premiere at the Humana Festival of New American Plays at Actors Theatre of Louisville in March 2006. The curtainup.com reviewer wrote: "This serious, slice-of-life drama, extremely well written and superbly acted, may be considered old-fashioned by some who see it as soap opera. But it could have a long life in regional theatre if not in New York."

Sunlight premiered at the Marin Theatre Company, Mill Valley, California, in January–February 2010, and in Seattle, Washington at ArtsWest in March–April 2010. The Seattle Times reviewer wrote: "Articulate and probing, if at times straining for effect, "Sunlight" (a National New Play Network selection) sheds some rays on the provocative matter of terrorism and torture." Sunlight received an Edgerton Foundation New American Play Awards, 2009.

Annapurna premiered at the Magic Theatre, San Francisco, California, in November 2011, with direction by Loretta Greco and featuring Rod Gnapp and Denise Cormier. The play next ran at The Odyssey Theatre, Los Angeles, California from April 2013 through June 2013, and starred Megan Mullally and Nick Offerman with direction by Bart DeLorenzo. The play opened Off-Broadway at the Acorn Theatre, in a production by The New Group on April 13, 2014 (previews) through June 1, 2014. Mullally and Offerman again star, with direction by Bart DeLorenzo.

His Broadway debut was his play The Other Place, which was produced by the Manhattan Theatre Club, and opened at the Samuel J. Friedman Theatre from December 2012 (in previews) through March 3, 2013. The play, directed by Joe Mantello, starred Laurie Metcalf and Daniel Stern. It was originally produced Off-Broadway by the MCC Theater in 2011. The New York Times reviewer of the Off-Broadway production wrote:"A sense of disorientation unites audience and protagonist in 'The Other Place,' a new drama by Sharr White about a forceful businesswoman confronting the onset of an illness whose nature keeps eluding her grasp. The play... is dominated by a compelling, at times scarily intense performance from Laurie Metcalf." The Other Place received two Outer Critics Circle Award nominations, for Outstanding New Off-Broadway Play and Outstanding Actress in a Play (Laurie Metcalf).

White's play The Snow Geese premiered on Broadway in a joint Manhattan Theatre Club MCC Theater production at the Samuel J. Friedman Theatre. The play ran from October 24, 2013, through December 15, 2013 and starred Mary-Louise Parker, Danny Burstein, and Victoria Clark, and was directed by Daniel J. Sullivan. The play takes place during WWI and, according to the USA Today reviewer, is "...a lovely, moving account of a clan's struggle to adapt to trying circumstances and a changing world."

White has also written for television, contributing episodes of The Affair (2015–2018), Halston (2021) and Generation (2021).

In 2023, White premiered his latest play Pictures From Home on Broadway at Studio 54. The memory play is adapted from the book of the same name by photographer Larry Sultan. The play stars Nathan Lane, Danny Burstein, and Zoë Wanamaker. The play revolves around a son photographing his parents in their Californian home in the 1980s.

== Work ==
=== Television ===
Year	Title	Writer	Producer	Network	Notes	Ref.
2015–2018	The Affair	Yes	Executive	Showtime series	32 episodes	
2019	Sweetbitter	Yes	Executive	Starz series	8 episodes	
2021	Genera+ion	Yes	Executive	HBO Max series	16 episodes	
2021	Halston	Yes	Yes	Netflix series	5 episodes	
2024	Presumed Innocent	Yes	Executive	Apple TV+ series	8 episodes	
2024–2026	Palm Royale	Yes	Executive	Apple TV+ series	20 episodes	

=== Theatre ===
Year	Title	Role	Venue	Ref.
2011	The Other Place	Playwright	Samuel J. Friedman Theatre, Broadway	
2014	The Snow Geese	Playwright	Samuel J. Friedman Theatre, Broadway	
2023	Pictures From Home	Playwright	Studio 54, Broadway	

== Accolades ==
Organizations	Year	Category	Work	Result	Ref.
Primetime Emmy Award	2024	Outstanding Comedy Series	Palm Royale	Nominated	
Writers Guild of America Awards	2021	Long Form – Adapted	Halston	Nominated	
Writers Guild of America Awards	2024	Limited Scenes	Presumed Innocent	Nominated	
