= Justin Tanner =

American dramatist

- Born: Stephen Justin Tanner
- Occupations: Playwright, theatre director, screenwriter
- Writing career
- Period: Late 20th century – present
- Notable works: Wife Swappers, Oklahomo, Space Therapy, Voice Lessons
- Notable awards: Pen West Award (for Pot Mom)

Justin Tanner (né Stephen Justin Tanner) (born 20th century) is an American playwright, theatre director, and screenwriter.

Based in Los Angeles, California, he is the author of Wife Swappers and Oklahomo (both staged at the Third Stage Theater in Burbank, California) and Space Therapy (at the Zephyr Theater in Hollywood and nominated for an L.A. Stage Alliance Ovation Award).

He has written and directed numerous plays, including Pot Mom (which won a Pen West Award), Teen Girl, Bitter Women, Tent Show, and Coyote Woman.

Tanner also wrote, with then-partner Andy Daley, Zombie Attack, which ran for ten years at the Cast Theater in Hollywood, and has since had numerous revivals.

== Career ==
Tanner was resident playwright of the Cast Theater which was originally run by the late Ted Schmitt and Dana Gibson. In early 1990s, he took control of the Cast Theater and his association with Gibson ended. A several-month revival of several popular Tanner plays resulted. Tanner left the Cast Theater in late 1999.

His many other projects have included doing a weekly late-night live comedy serial called The Strip starring, among others, John Waters luminary Mink Stole, and being a staff writer on television's Gilmore Girls and the short-lived cult favorite Love Monkey, and directing the yearly Christmas satire Bob's Office Party.

Tanner's play Voice Lessons opened in 2009, and had an extended run at the Zephyr Theater. The cast included Laurie Metcalf, French Stewart, and Maile Flanagan. It was co-directed with Bart DeLorenzo, with whom Tanner became acquainted during the run of The Strip at the Evidence Room, where DeLorenzo was artistic director.

A later run of Voice Lessons at the Sacred Fools Theater Company was nominated for four Ovation Awards, including Best Play in an Intimate Theatre (Linda Toliver and Gary Guidinger in Association with Sacred Fools Theater Company), Acting Ensemble for a Play (Laurie Metcalf, French Stewart and Maile Flanagan), Lead Actor in a Play (Stewart as Nate), and Lead Actress in a Play (Metcalf as Virginia).

Voice Lessons received its East Coast premiere at the Mad Horse Theater Company in Portland, Maine, opening for a limited run on March 22, 2010.

== Personal life ==
Tanner is openly gay. He stated to The Advocate magazine in 2005 that he was in a relationship with musician Kristian Hoffman.
