= The Baltimore Waltz =

Play written by Paula Vogel

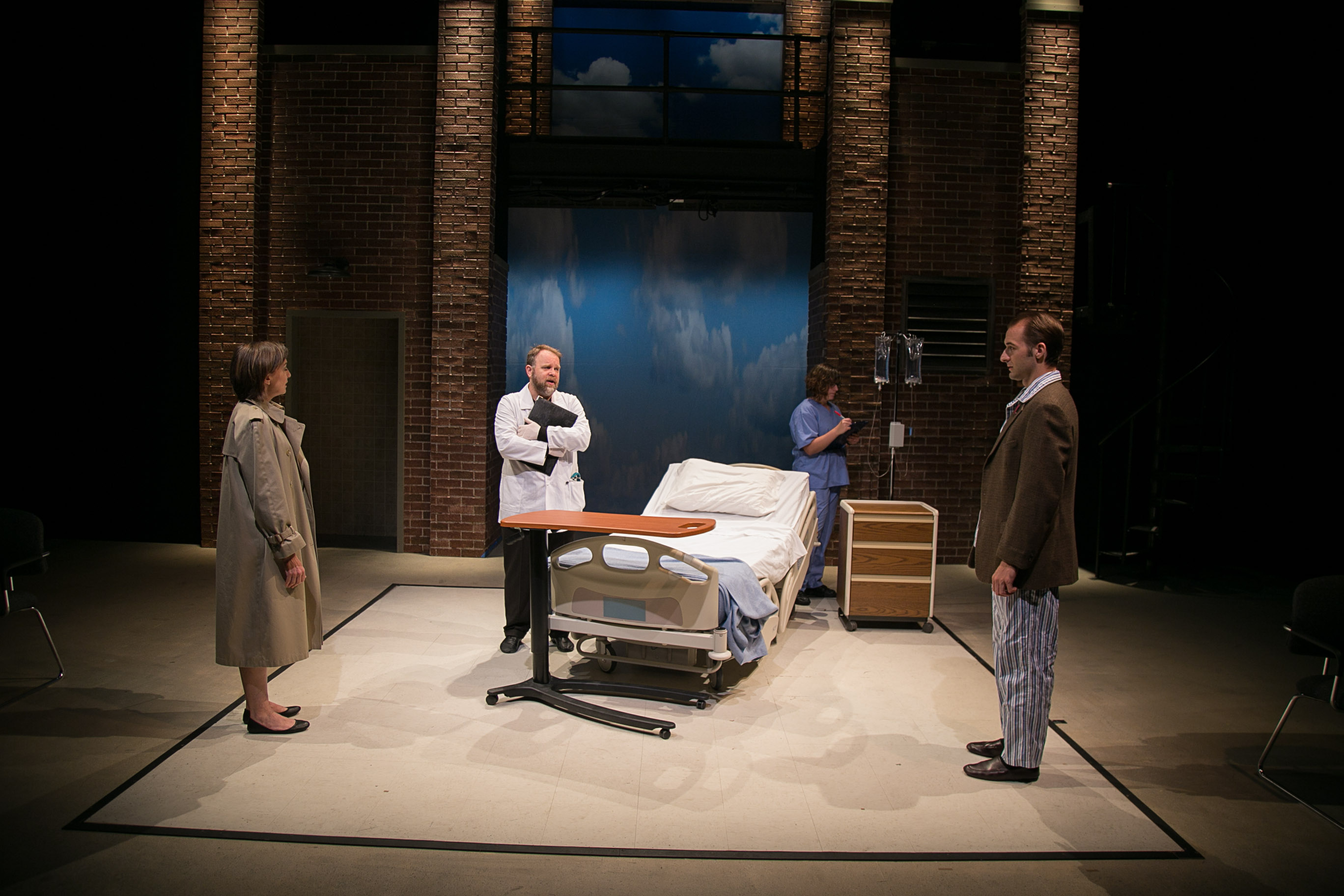
- Scene from a 2015 production of The Baltimore Waltz
- Original language: English
- Written by: Paula Vogel
- Characters: Anna; Carl; The Third Man
- Genre: Drama
- Setting: A hospital lounge in Baltimore, Maryland

Premiere
- Date: 1992
- Place: Alley Theatre

The Baltimore Waltz is a play by Paula Vogel. It revolves around a brother and sister who appear to be taking a European trip and is based on Vogel and her brother Carl's real-life experiences. The play had a workshop at the Perseverance Theatre in 1990, it was first staged at Houston's Alley Theatre in 1992 and made its off-Broadway premiere later that year.

== Overview ==
Essentially a series of comic vignettes underlined by tragedy, the farce traces the European odyssey of sister and brother Anna and Carl. They are in search of hedonistic pleasure and a cure for her terminal illness, the fictitious ATD (Acquired Toilet Disease) she contracted by using the bathrooms at the elementary school where she teaches. Knowing her life is nearing its end, Anna is driven by a lust that compels her to have casual sex with as many men as possible during their travels, a passion shared by her gay brother. Assisting the pair is the mysterious Third Man, a reference to the classic suspense film starring Joseph Cotten and Orson Welles, to which Vogel frequently alludes in detail.

The play actually takes place in a hospital room in Baltimore, Maryland, where Carl has a terminal illness, and Anna is imagining the trip that the two never took.

== Plot ==
Anna, a single school teacher in Baltimore, finds out from the doctor that she has contracted Acquired Toilet Disease from the toilet in her classroom. In an attempt to find a cure, she, and her brother Carl, plan a trip abroad to see Dr. Todesrocheln in Vienna. At the airport, on their way to Paris, Carl makes Anna hold his stuffed rabbit as they walk through security.

Once in Paris, the pair visit the Eiffel Tower and Anna notices a man in a trench coat and beret carrying an identical stuffed rabbit that Carl has. She feels convinced they are being followed. Carl waves the suspicions away and they continue to a French bistro. After their meal Anna sleeps with the Garcon, while Carl wanders the Louvre.

Anna spends the rest of their trip in Paris afflicted with the six stages that affect terminal illness patients. It is after Anna reaches the sixth stage, Hope, that she feels the desire to continue their trip to Vienna to see the doctor.

In Holland, Anna sleeps with The Little Dutch Boy at Age 50, a reference to Hans Brinker, or The Silver Skates. When Anna returns from her trip, she spots Carl on the Magere Brug. Carl meets the man in a trench coat and sunglasses. Both hold stuffed rabbits. Upon meeting in the middle of the bridge, the two stroke each other's stuffed rabbits before parting in opposite directions. That night, Carl refuses to explain what happened and says that they must leave for Germany immediately.

On the train, on the way to Germany, Anna and Carl show the audience slides from their trip. However, their descriptions of the German countryside are combined with pictures that do not match. For example, when Carl speaks about Neuschwanstein Castle, the slides show a picture of the castle at Disneyland. The pictures are primarily of Baltimore or the Johns Hopkins Hospital. In Germany, Anna continues to sleep around as tensions rise between her and Carl. Carl feels frustrated that Anna is not spending time with him. Once he and Anna make up, Carl convinces her to go to Vienna to meet up with one of his college friends, Harry Lime, because he might be able to get them medicine.

Upon arriving in Vienna, Carl meets Harry on a ferris wheel. Harry Lime sells blackmarket medicine that he makes in his kitchen—he is a self-proclaimed businessman who sells hope. Harry Lime and Carl fight over Carl's stuffed rabbit.

Meanwhile, at the doctor's office, Anna and Dr. Todesrocheln discuss his work with urine. While they speak, Dr. Todesrocheln fights with himself over drinking Anna's urine sample. He drinks it and Anna recognizes him as the Doctor from the first scene. Anna rushes back to the hotel room to find Carl laying stiff in bed with a white sheet over him. She gets him to stand up and they waltz before the Doctor pulls a white curtain across the stage.

Anna stands in the hospital lounge as the Doctor delivers the news that her brother Carl is dead. It is revealed that they did not travel abroad and Anna did not have ATD.

== Background ==
The play was Vogel's response to the 1988 death of her brother Carl, who died from complications due to AIDS before they were able to enjoy a long planned European vacation.

Vogel wrote the play during summer 1989 at the MacDowell Colony, New Hampshire. The play is dedicated To the memory of Carl - because I cannot sew. This is a reference to the AIDS quilt. The printed script contains a letter from Carl to Paula, dated March 1987, discussing his funeral ceremony.

== Production history ==
The Baltimore Waltz was first produced in a workshop at the Perseverance Theatre (Molly Smith, artistic director; Deborah B. Baley, producing director) in Juneau, Alaska, in October 1990.

The play was first fully staged in January 1992, in Houston, at the Alley Theatre. The Houston production then transferred to New York.

The Baltimore Waltz premiered Off-Broadway at the Circle Repertory Company (Tanya Berezin, artistic director), running from January 29, 1992 to March 15, 1992. It was directed by Anne Bogart, with Cherry Jones as Anna, Richard Thompson as Carl and Joe Mantello as the Third Man. Set design was by Loy Arcenas, costumes by Walker Hicklin, lighting by Dennis Parichy and sound score by John Gromada.

1992 Obie Awards went to Vogel for Best New American Play, Jones for Best Performance, and Bogart for Best Direction.

It was staged at the Yale Repertory Theater, New Haven, Connecticut in May 2003, directed by Stan Wojewodski Jr. By then it had become one of the most popular plays for regional theatres throughout the United States.

An Off-Broadway revival produced by the Signature Theatre Company and directed by Mark Brokaw opened on December 5, 2004 at the Peter Norton Space, where it ran through January 2005. The cast included Kristen Johnston as Anna, David Marshall Grant as Carl, and Jeremy Webb as the Third Man.

== Critical response ==
Frank Rich noted in his review of the 1992 production in the New York Times that “Ms. Vogel has succeeded in creating that memorial is most apparent when she finally must burst the balloon, turning her enchanted accidental tourist back into a grieving schoolteacher, the rabbit back into a dying man's bedside totem, the mysteries of Vienna back into the cold, clammy realities of a hospital ward in Baltimore.”

J. Wynn Rousuck noted in her review of the 1992 production in The Baltimore Sun that "...it becomes clear that the play's overriding -- and saddest -- fantasy is a fantasy of denial. Gradually, the truth about the disease, the European tour and even the identity of the patient begins to impinge on the wacky, offbeat tone..."

Malcolm L. Johnson in his review for the Hartford Courant of the 1992 Off-Broadway production wrote: " "The Baltimore Waltz" sounds like one of those cutesy, self-indulgent, even tasteless new plays that can make theater-going a dreaded experience. Yet despite all those things—no, in large part because of them—Vogel's uproarious, searching and finally devastating creation adds up to the very best of theater. Even to say that this is the theater's most deeply felt and richly expressed response to the AIDS plague is to diminish its powers."

Ada Calhoun wrote of the 2004 revival in The New York Magazine: "...the show succeeds as a loving tribute and political statement, as theater it's stuck in an odd realm between rollicking farce and whimsical melodrama."

Beatrice Loayza noted in her review of the 2019 revival production in the DC Metro Theater Arts that the play is “an ambitious piece of theater, fusing melodrama with farce and wish fulfillment with stark reality, in an impressively short length (the play runs 90 minutes). With work so dense and conceptually challenging, and with a payoff after the final twist that will melt your heart…”
