= Joe Mantello =

American actor and director

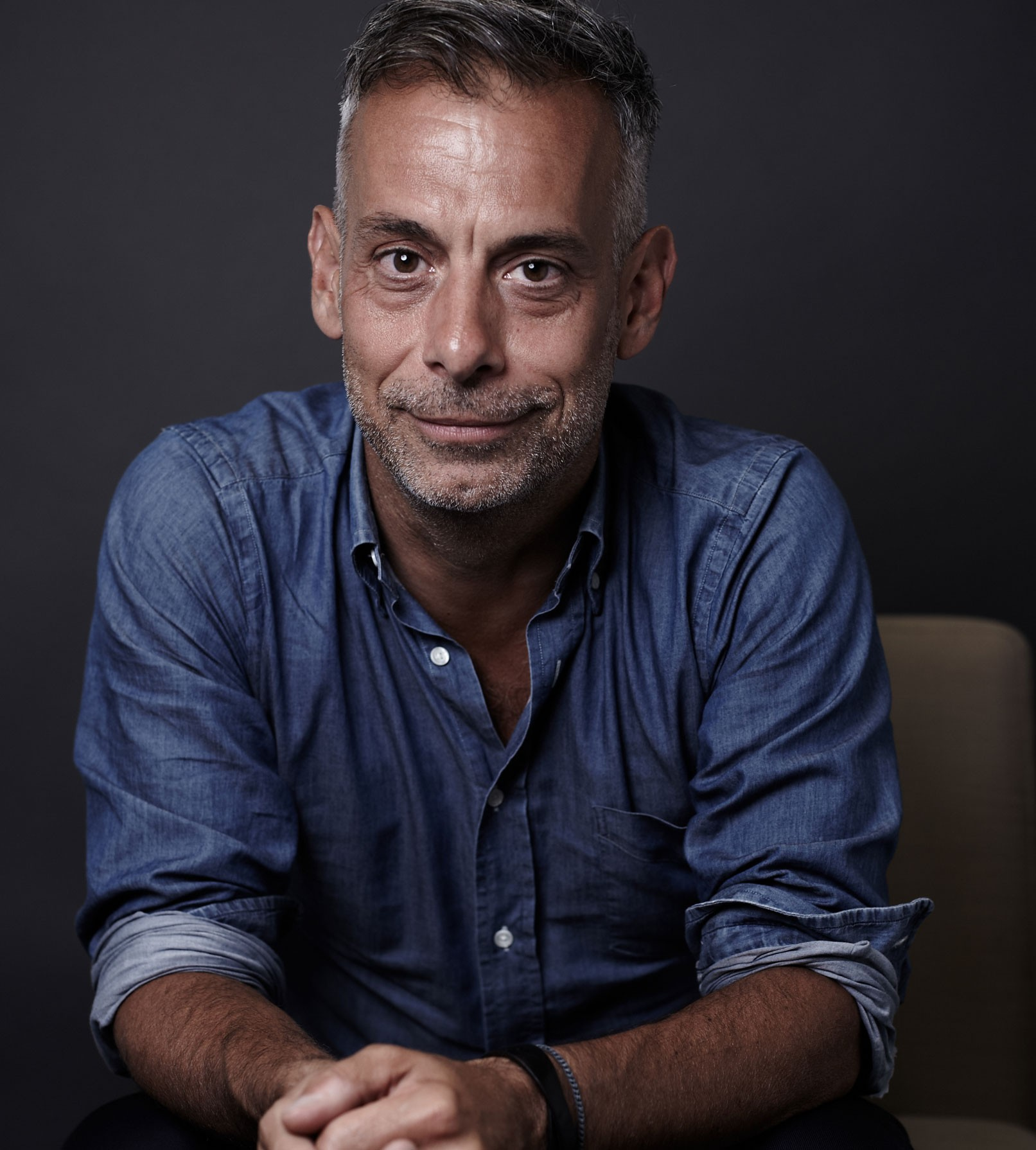
- Mantello at Wicked 10th Birthday 2016
- Born: Joseph Mantello; December 27, 1962 (age 63); Rockford, Illinois, U.S.
- Education: University of North Carolina School of the Arts (BFA)
- Occupations: Actor; director
- Years active: 1989–present
- Partner: Jon Robin Baitz (1990–2002)
- Awards: Full list

Joseph Mantello (born December 27, 1962) is an American actor and director known for his work on stage and screen. He first gained prominence for his Broadway acting debut in the original production of Tony Kushner's two-part epic play Angels in America (1993–1994), for which he received a nomination for the Tony Award for Best Featured Actor in a Play. He has since acted in acclaimed Broadway revivals of Larry Kramer's The Normal Heart (2011) and Tennessee Williams' The Glass Menagerie (2017).

Mantello has transitioned into a career as a Broadway director, winning the Tony Award for Best Direction of a Play for Take Me Out (2003) and Death of a Salesman (2026) and the Tony Award for Best Direction of a Musical for Assassins (2004). He has directed notable productions such as Wicked (2003), Glengarry Glen Ross (2005), The Humans (2016), Three Tall Women (2018), and The Boys in the Band (2018).

== Early life and education ==
Mantello was born in Rockford, Illinois, the son of Judy and Richard Mantello, an accountant. His father is of Italian ancestry and his mother is of half Italian descent. He was raised Catholic.

Mantello studied at the North Carolina School of the Arts; he started the Edge Theater in New York City with actress Mary-Louise Parker and writer Peter Hedges. He is a founding member of the Naked Angels theater company and an associate artist at the Roundabout Theatre Company.

== Career ==
Mantello came to New York from Illinois, after graduating from UNCSA’s School of Drama in 1984. In the midst of the AIDS crisis, having overcome a youthful feeling, he admitted to a reporter in 2013, that "for some reason I was deeply ashamed of the theater early on. I think it had to do with this growing sense I was gay, although I couldn’t have put a word to it back then. Where I grew up, boys played sports. When [teacher] Mrs. Windsor wrote in my yearbook, 'Have you ever considered a career in the theater?' it was literally like she wrote the word 'faggot'."

Mantello began his theatrical career as an actor in Keith Curran's Walking the Dead and Paula Vogel's The Baltimore Waltz. On the transition from acting to directing, Mantello said, "I think I've become a better actor since I started directing, although some people might disagree. Since I've been removed from the process I see things that actors fall into. Now there's a part of me that's removed from the process and can stand back."

Mantello directs a variety of theatre works, as The New York Times noted: "Very few American directors – Jack O'Brien and Mike Nichols come to mind – successfully jump genres and styles the way Mr. Mantello does, moving from a two-hander like Frankie and Johnny in the Clair de Lune to the huge canvas of a mainstream musical comedy like Wicked, from downtown stand-up (The Santaland Diaries) to contemporary opera (Dead Man Walking) to political performance art (The Vagina Monologues)."

A Roundabout Theatre Company revival of Lips Together, Teeth Apart directed by Mantello was scheduled to open at the American Airlines Theatre in April 2010, when one of the stars, Megan Mullally, suddenly quit. The production was postponed indefinitely due to her departure.

Mantello directed the Jon Robin Baitz play Other Desert Cities at the Booth Theatre in 2011. He returned to acting for the first time in over a decade with the role of Ned Weeks in the Broadway limited engagement revival of The Normal Heart in April 2011, for which he was nominated for the Tony Award as Best Performance by an Actor in a Leading Role in a Play. Mantello had previously been nominated for the Tony Award for his role as Louis in Angels in America.

He directed the Off-Broadway world premiere of the musical Dogfight in the summer of 2012 at the Second Stage Theater. In January 2013, he directed the Broadway premiere of Sharr White's The Other Place at the Samuel J. Friedman Theatre. In 2014 he directed Sting's new musical The Last Ship. He directed the Harvey Fierstein play Casa Valentina, which premiered on Broadway in April 2014.

Mantello acted in the revival of The Glass Menagerie which opened on Broadway at the Belasco Theatre in February 2017. Directed by Sam Gold, the play starred Sally Field as Amanda Wingfield, with Mantello playing Tom.

In 2018, Joe Mantello was inducted into the American Theater Hall of Fame. In 2022, Mantello was featured in the book 50 Key Figures in Queer US Theatre.

== Personal life ==
From 1990 to 2002, Mantello was in a relationship with playwright Jon Robin Baitz. As of 2018, he lives with Paul Marlow, who owns a custom clothing company in Manhattan.

== Works ==
=== Theater ===
==== Acting credits ====
Year	Title	Credit(s)	Playwright	Venue
1991	Walking the Dead	Stan	Keith Curran	Circle Repertory Company, Off-Broadway
1992	The Baltimore Waltz	Third Man	Paula Vogel	Circle Repertory Company, Off-Broadway
1993	Angels in America: Millennium Approaches	Louis Ironson	Tony Kushner	Walter Kerr Theatre, Broadway
1994	Angels in America: Perestroika	Louis Ironson; Sarah Ironson; Council of Principalities	Tony Kushner	Walter Kerr Theatre, Broadway
2010	The Normal Heart	Ned Weeks	Larry Kramer	John Golden Theatre, Broadway
2017	The Glass Menagerie	Tom Wingfield	Tennessee Williams	Belasco Theatre, Broadway

==== Directing credits ====
Year	Title	Playwright / composer	Venue
1990	Imagining Brad	Peter Hedges	Players Theatre, Off-Broadway
1991	Babylon Gardens	Timothy Mason	Circle Repertory Company, Off-Broadway
1992	Three Hotels	Jon Robin Baitz	Circle Repertory Company, Off-Broadway
1994	Love! Valour! Compassion!	Terrence McNally	New York City Center Stage I, Off-Broadway
1994	What's Wrong with This Picture	Donald Margulies	Brooks Atkinson Theatre, Broadway
1995	Love! Valour! Compassion!	Terrence McNally	Walter Kerr Theatre, Broadway
1996	Blue Window	Craig Lucas	New York City Center Stage I, Off-Broadway
1996	The Santaland Diaries	David Sedaris; Joe Mantello	Linda Gross Theater, Off-Broadway
1997	God's Heart	Craig Lucas	Mitzi E. Newhouse Theater, Off-Broadway
1997	Proposals	Neil Simon	Broadhurst Theatre, Broadway
1998	Mizlansky/Zilinsky or "Schmucks"	Jon Robin Baitz	New York City Center Stage I, Off-Broadway
1998	Corpus Christi	Terrence McNally	New York City Center Stage I, Off-Broadway
1999	The Mineola Twins	Paula Vogel	Laura Pels Theater, Off-Broadway
1999	The Vagina Monologues	Eve Ensler	Westside Theatre, Off-Broadway
1999	Another American: Asking and Telling	Marc Wolf	Theatre at St. Clement's, Off-Broadway
2001	Design for Living	Noël Coward	American Airlines Theatre, Broadway
2002	An Evening with Mario Cantone	Mario Cantone	American Airlines Theatre, Broadway
2002	Take Me Out	Richard Greenberg	The Public Theater, Off-Broadway
2002	Frankie and Johnny in the Clair de Lune	Terrence McNally	Belasco Theatre, Broadway
2002	A Man of No Importance	Lynn Ahrens; Stephen Flaherty; Terrence McNally	Mitzi E. Newhouse Theater, Off-Broadway
2003	Take Me Out	Richard Greenberg	Walter Kerr Theatre, Broadway
2003	Wicked	Stephen Schwartz; Winnie Holzman	Gershwin Theatre, Broadway
2004	Assassins	Stephen Sondheim; John Weidman	Studio 54, Broadway
2004	Laugh Whore	Mario Cantone	Cort Theatre, Broadway
2005	Glengarry Glen Ross	David Mamet	Royale Theatre, Broadway
2005	The Odd Couple	Neil Simon	Brooks Atkinson Theatre, Broadway
2006	Three Days of Rain	Richard Greenberg	Bernard B. Jacobs Theatre, Broadway
2007	Blackbird	David Harrower	New York City Center Stage I, Off-Broadway
2007	The Ritz	Terrence McNally	Studio 54, Broadway
2007	The Receptionist	Adam Bock	New York City Center Stage I, Off-Broadway
2008	November	David Mamet	Ethel Barrymore Theatre, Broadway
2008	Pal Joey	Richard Rodgers; Lorenz Hart; John O'Hara	Studio 54, Broadway
2009	9 to 5	Dolly Parton; Patricia Resnick	Marquis Theatre, Broadway
2010	The Pride	Alexi Kaye Campbell	Lucille Lortel Theatre, Off-Broadway
2011	Other Desert Cities	Jon Robin Baitz	Mitzi E. Newhouse Theater, Off-Broadway
2011	The Other Place	Sharr White	Lucille Lortel Theatre, Off-Broadway
2011	8	Dustin Lance Black	Eugene O'Neill Theatre, Broadway
2011	Other Desert Cities	Jon Robin Baitz	Booth Theatre, Broadway
2012	Dogfight	Benj Pasek; Justin Paul; Peter Duchan	Second Stage Theater, Off-Broadway
2013	The Other Place	Sharr White	Samuel J. Friedman Theatre, Broadway
2013	I'll Eat You Last: A Chat with Sue Mengers	John Logan	Booth Theatre, Broadway
2014	Casa Valentina	Harvey Fierstein	Samuel J. Friedman Theatre, Broadway
2014	The Last Ship	Sting; John Logan	Neil Simon Theatre, Broadway
2015	Airline Highway	Lisa D'Amour	Samuel J. Friedman Theatre, Broadway
2015	An Act of God	David Javerbaum	Studio 54, Broadway
2015	The Humans	Stephen Karam	Laura Pels Theater, Off-Broadway
2016	The Humans	Stephen Karam	Gerald Schoenfeld Theatre, Broadway
2016	Blackbird	David Harrower	Belasco Theatre, Broadway
2016	An Act of God	David Javerbaum	Booth Theatre, Broadway
2018	Three Tall Women	Edward Albee	John Golden Theatre, Broadway
2018	The Boys in the Band	Mart Crowley	Booth Theatre, Broadway
2019	Hillary and Clinton	Lucas Hnath	John Golden Theatre, Broadway
2020	Who's Afraid of Virginia Woolf?	Edward Albee	Booth Theatre, Broadway
2023	Grey House	Levi Holloway	Lyceum Theatre, Broadway
2023	Here We Are	Stephen Sondheim; David Ives	The Shed, Off-Broadway
2024	Little Bear Ridge Road	Samuel D. Hunter	Steppenwolf Theatre, Chicago
2025	Here We Are	Stephen Sondheim; David Ives	Royal National Theatre, London
2025	Little Bear Ridge Road	Samuel D. Hunter	Booth Theatre, Broadway
2026	Death of a Salesman	Arthur Miller	Winter Garden Theatre, Broadway

=== Film ===
Year	Title	Role(s)	Notes
1989	Cookie	Dominick	
1997	Love! Valour! Compassion!	—N/a	Director
2020	The Boys in the Band	—N/a	Director and producer

=== Television ===
Year	Title	Role(s)	Notes
1990	Three Hotels	—N/a	Director; Television movie
1990	The Days and Nights of Molly Dodd	Mickey	Episode: "Here's Why You Can Never Have Too Much Petty Cash"
1991–98	Law & Order	Public Defender / Philip Marco	2 episodes
1993	Sisters	Adam Olderberg	Episode: "Moving Pictures"
1995	Central Park West	Ian Walker	3 episodes
2014	The Normal Heart	Mickey Marcus	HBO television film
2020	Hollywood	Dick Samuels	7 episodes
2022	The Watcher	John Graff	5 episodes
2022	American Horror Story: NYC	Gino Barelli	10 episodes
2024	Feud: Capote vs. The Swans	Jack Dunphy	7 episodes

== See also ==
- LGBT culture in New York City
- List of LGBT people from New York City

== See also ==
- LGBT culture in New York City
- List of LGBT people from New York City
