= Little Bear Ridge Road =

2024 American drama play

- 2025 Broadway playbill
- Original language: English
- Written by: Samuel D. Hunter
- Characters: Sarah, sixties Ethan, early to mid thirties James, late twenties or early thirties Paulette, forties or fifties
- Subject: Drama
- Setting: North Idaho, 2020-2022

Premiere
- Date: 2024
- Place: Steppenwolf Theatre Company

Little Bear Ridge Road is a play written by Samuel D. Hunter. The play, set in the outskirts of Troy, Idaho, tells the story of an estranged nephew and his aunt who reunite at the beginning of the COVID-19 pandemic to settle the estate of their deceased father and brother, respectively. Though emotionally distant, they find themselves drawn to care for each other.

== Production history ==
=== Origins ===
Commissioned by Steppenwolf Theatre Company as a vehicle for Laurie Metcalf's return to her hometown theater, the play was workshopped at Steppenwolf in Chicago, Illinois in 2023. It won the 2024 Jeff Award for New Work.

Hunter stated that his initial point of inspiration for Little Bear Ridge Road was to write a play about people watching television, and that the pandemic setting was only added once he started writing the play in 2023, reflecting how "we all retreated to our screens" when the COVID-19 pandemic began.

According to Hunter, he decided to focus on the relationship between an aunt and nephew mourning a patriarch, as opposed to that of a mother and son, because "I've never really seen this relationship explored specifically in a play." He stated that the specificity of Sarah and Ethan's relationship "could be really close, or almost strangers."

=== Staging ===
The play had its world premiere at Steppenwolf Theatre Company. The cast, directed by Joe Mantello, included Laurie Metcalf as Sarah and Micah Stock as Ethan. The set was designed by Scott Pask, costumes by Jessica Pabst, lighting by Heather Gilbert, sound by Mikhail Fiksel, dramaturgy by John M. Baker, and casting by JC Clementz.

Joe Mantello directed a 2025 Broadway production with Metcalf and Stock returning. Previews began on October 7, 2025, and opening night was October 30. Scott Rudin and Barry Diller were the producers, a controversial decision after reports of past abusive behavior from Rudin. The production closed on December 21, 2025, citing financial reasons. The week after opening, box office receipts peaked at $528,181 and then slowly declined to $422,091 in mid-December 2025. At that point, only 68 percent of seats were filled. The show costs just over $500,000 per week to run in the theater.

== Cast and characters ==
Character	Chicago	Broadway
Character	2024	2025
Sarah	Laurie Metcalf	Laurie Metcalf
Ethan	Micah Stock	Micah Stock
James	John Drea	John Drea
Paulette	Meighan Gerachis	Meighan Gerachis

== Reception ==
Steven Oxman wrote in the Chicago Sun-Times of the Chicago run: "This is a deeply beautiful piece of writing, bleakly funny, poetic in its plainness, aching in its intense empathy for the characters". Another reviewer, Karen Topham, wrote: "Little Bear Ridge Road is everything theatre should be and everything Steppenwolf always was".

Laura Collins-Hughes wrote in the New York Times of the Broadway production: “As played by a glorious Laurie Metcalf in Samuel D. Hunter’s keen-eyed, compassionate play…[Sarah] is also one of the funniest and most thoroughly human characters seen lately on a New York stage.”

== Awards and nominations ==
Year	Award	Category	Work	Result	Ref.
2025	American Theatre Critics Association Award	Harold and Mimi Steinberg/ATCA New Play Award	Samuel D. Hunter	Nominated	
2026	Outer Critics Circle Award	Outstanding New Broadway Play		Nominated	
2026	Drama League Award	Outstanding Direction of a Play	Joe Mantello	Won	
2026	Drama League Award	Distinguished Performance	Laurie Metcalf	Nominated	
2026	New York Drama Critics' Circle Award	Best Play		Won	
2026	Tony Awards	Best Play		Nominated	
2026	Dorian Award	Outstanding Broadway Play		Nominated	
2026	Dorian Award	Outstanding LGBTQ Broadway Production		Nominated	
2026	Dorian Award	Outstanding Lead Performance in a Broadway Play	Laurie Metcalf	Nominated	
