= A Doll's House, Part 2 =

2017 play by Lucas Hnath

- TCG Editions cover art
- Original language: English
- Written by: Lucas Hnath
- Subject: A Doll's House

Premiere
- Date: April 9th, 2017
- Place: South Coast Repertory

A Doll's House, Part 2 is a 2017 play written by Lucas Hnath. The play premiered at the South Coast Repertory, in April 2017, before opening on Broadway at the John Golden Theatre. The play "picks up after Henrik Ibsen's 1879 play A Doll's House concludes".

== Productions ==
The play was commissioned by South Coast Repertory in Costa Mesa, California, where it was directed by Shelley Butler in April 2017. The play opened on Broadway on April 27, 2017, after previews, which began on March 30, 2017, at the John Golden Theatre. The Broadway production was directed by Sam Gold and the cast featured Laurie Metcalf, Chris Cooper, Jayne Houdyshell, and Condola Rashad. This marked Hnath's Broadway debut.

The Broadway production had been extended to January 7, 2018, past the original 16-week limited engagement closing in July. However, it was announced on September 6, 2017 that the production would close on September 24, 2017.

Metcalf, Cooper, and Rashād exited the production on July 23. They were replaced by Julie White as Nora, Stephen McKinley Henderson as Torvald, and Erin Wilhelmi as Emmy.

The Melbourne Theatre Company was scheduled to present the Australian premiere, featuring Marta Dusseldorp, opening in August 2018.

A production directed by James Macdonald and starring Noma Dumezweni premiered in the UK on 10 June 2022 - 6 August 2022 at the Donmar Warehouse.

== Overview ==
The play, set in 1894, concerns Nora, who had left her family and then returns after 15 years. The play examines the "rules of society and gender."

== Characters ==
- Nora Helmer
- Torvald Helmer
- Emmy Helmer, the daughter of Nora and Torvald
- Anne Marie, the Helmer family's nanny

== Synopsis ==
The play begins with a knock on the door — the same door that was slammed shut fifteen years earlier when Nora exited at the end of Ibsen’s play. Nora has returned, and it is she who is knocking. After leaving her husband, children, and the nursemaid, Nora became a successful feminist novelist who writes under a pseudonym. The reason for her return is to finalize a divorce from Torvald; she needs him to sign the legal papers. After the wife of a prominent judge leaves her husband upon reading Nora's roman á clef about her marriage to Torvald, the judge tracks down Nora's real identity and discovers that she is married. As Nora has signed legal contracts that can only be signed by unmarried women, the judge blackmails her with his newfound knowledge; either she publicly recants the feminist ideas that she has voiced throughout her career, or the judge reveals her marital status and deprives her of material comfort. The play begins at the Helmer home. Nora is questioned about what she has been doing, and the family and the nursemaid express their recriminations of her. Nora ultimately decides that she does not want a divorce, but that she will let herself be exposed, but Torvald reads Nora's novel and not wanting to be remembered by posterity as the character in Nora's novel, decides to divorce her in order to redeem himself. Nora ultimately makes her peace with Torvald and departs.

== Awards and nominations ==
Laurie Metcalf was nominated for the 2017 Drama Desk Award, Outstanding Actress in a Play, and Jayne Houdyshell was nominated for Outstanding Featured Actress in a Play.

The play was nominated for the 2017 Outer Critics Circle Awards: Outstanding New Broadway Play, Outstanding Actress in a Play (Laurie Metcalf) and Outstanding Featured Actress in a Play (Jayne Houdyshell).

The play received 8 Tony Award nominations in 2017: Best Play, Best Actor in a Play (Chris Cooper), Best Actress in a Play (Laurie Metcalf), Best Featured Actress in a Play (Jayne Houdyshell and Condola Rashad), Best Direction of a Play (Sam Gold) and Best Costume Design in a Play (David Zinn), with Metcalf eventually winning.
