= November (play) =

2008 play by David Mamet

- Original language: English
- Written by: David Mamet
- Characters: President Charles Smith; Clarice Bernstein
- Genre: Comedy
- Setting: A few days before a major presidential election in the Oval Office of the White House

Premiere
- Date: January 17, 2008
- Place: Ethel Barrymore Theatre; New York City

November is a play written by David Mamet which premiered on Broadway in 2008.

== Productions ==
November premiered on Broadway at the Ethel Barrymore Theatre on December 20, 2007 (previews), officially on January 17, 2008, and closed on July 13, 2008, after 205 performances and 33 previews. The play was directed by Joe Mantello and starred Nathan Lane, Laurie Metcalf, Ethan Phillips, Michael Nichols, and Dylan Baker. Metcalf received a Tony Award nomination as Best Featured Actress in a Play.

The New England premiere took place at the Lyric Stage Company of Boston in October 2008, directed by Daniel Gidron.

It premiered at Houston's Alley Theatre in August 2012, directed by Sanford Robbins.

As part of the streaming series, "Spotlight on Plays", there was a reading of the play to benefit The Actors Fund of America during the Covid19 Pandemic. It was streamed through the YouTube and Facebook accounts of Broadway's Best Shows. The reading starred John Malkovich, Patti LuPone, Dylan Baker, Ethan Phillips and Michael Nichols, and was directed by David Mamet. It was streamed live on Thursday, May 7th, 2020 at 8pm EST/ 5pm PST.

== Overview ==
Billed as a comedy, November centers on President Charles Smith (originally played by Nathan Lane) several days before his second election. Metcalf played Clarice Bernstein, Smith's speechwriter, and Baker played Archer Brown, Smith's advisor. Phillips portrayed The Turkey Representative, and Nichols portrayed Indian Chief Dwight Grackle.

== Critical reception ==
The play received mixed reviews. Ben Brantley in The New York Times wrote that it is a "glib and jaunty new play", and that "Mr. Lane, it goes without saying, knows exactly how to pitch such lines, with a time-honed style that allows him to put the maximum spin on poisonous zingers and still keep the audience on his side."

In a 2017 article for The Times Literary Supplement, Jaki Mccarrick said of November, Race, and The Anarchist that "these are state-of-the-nation plays. Each of them is outstanding, and bears Mamet’s trademarks – rhythmic and witty dialogue, erudition, flawless musicality – while being similar in construction and in how their big ideas are explored. They are also sufficiently different to be treated as stand-alone pieces, (though I would be glad to see them performed together)."

== Awards and nominations ==
=== Original Broadway production ===
Year	Award	Category	Nominee	Result
2008	Tony Award	Best Featured Actress in a Play	Laurie Metcalf	Nominated
