= Lucas Hnath =

American playwright (born 1979)

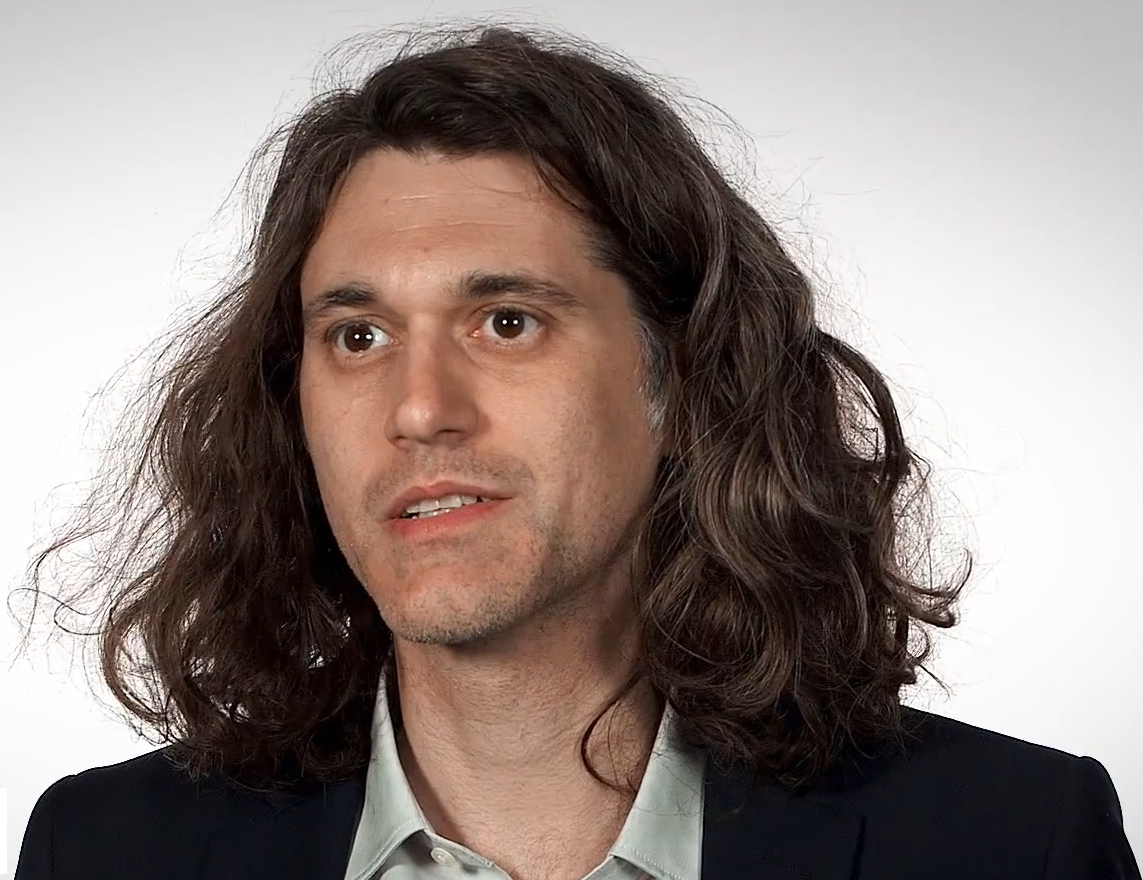
- Hnath in 2017
- Born: 1979 (age 46–47); Orlando, Florida, U.S.
- Education: New York University (BFA, MFA)
- Occupation: Playwright
- Writing career
- Notable works: The Christians, Red Speedo, A Doll's House, Part 2
- Notable awards: Joseph Kesselring Prize, Obie Award, Outer Critics Circle Award, Whiting Award, 2017 Steinberg Playwright Award

Lucas Hnath (/ˈneɪθ/ NAYTH) is an American playwright. He won the 2016 Obie Award for excellence in playwriting for his plays Red Speedo and The Christians. He also won a Whiting Award.

== Biography ==
Hnath was born Lucas Blanche in Miami, and grew up in Orlando, Florida. He moved to New York City in 1997 to study pre-med, and then changed to dramatic writing at the Tisch School of the Arts, at New York University, earning a BFA in 2001, and an MFA in 2002. He teaches at New York University.

He was a resident playwright at New Dramatists.

Red Speedo premiered Off-Broadway at the New York Theatre Workshop from February 17, 2016 to March 27, 2016. The play, directed by Lileana Blain-Cruz, won the Obie Award, Playwriting and Performance for Lucas Caleb Rooney. The play involves Ray, a competitive swimmer at the start of the trials for the Olympic team. Jesse Green, in his review for Vulture, wrote: "Hnath is never interested solely in the material repercussions of character... In Red Speedo, the underlying subject seems to be the cost of morality, which is generally too high for people like Ray... Hnath lightly suggests — he's too subtle to use the big hammer — that the immoral imbalance of our current economy is stripping us down to our animal skins. All we're good for is competition." The play opened at the Studio Theatre, Washington, DC, in 2013. The director of the production, Lila Neugebauer, explained: "...doping is just the arena for a conversation about what constitutes fairness, and the myth of equal opportunity."

His play A Doll's House, Part 2 premiered on Broadway at the John Golden Theatre on April 1, 2017 in previews and closed on September 24, 2017. Directed by Sam Gold, the cast featured Laurie Metcalf, Chris Cooper, Jayne Houdyshell, and Condola Rashad. The play was commissioned by South Coast Repertory, Costa Mesa, California, where it was running at the same time, directed by Shelley Butler, beginning April 9, 2017. This marked Hnath's Broadway debut. Hnath's play "picks up after Henrik Ibsen's A Doll's House concludes." The play was nominated for the 2017 Tony Award for Best Play and Laurie Metcalf won the 2017 Tony Award for Best Performance by an Actress in a Leading Role in a Play.

His play Hillary and Clinton opened in previews on Broadway at the John Golden Theatre on March 16, 2019, officially on April 18. The play was directed by Joe Mantello and stars Laurie Metcalf and John Lithgow. The play had pre-Broadway engagements starting in 2016 at the Victory Gardens Theater, Chicago.

Dana H. premiered at the Kirk Douglas Theatre (Los Angeles) on May 26, 2019 in previews, officially on June 2, presented by the Center Theatre Group. The play relates a real-life incident in the life of his mother, Dana Higginbotham. The play is directed by Les Waters and stars Deirdre O'Connell. The play was commissioned by The Civilians (New York) and the Goodman Theatre (Chicago), played at the Goodman later in 2019, and premiered on Broadway in 2021.

=== The Christians ===
His play The Christians concerns influence and faith in a megachurch, with much of the cast being a church "spirit-raising choir". The plot concerns a pastor who discards traditional fundamentalist Christianity in favor of a more inclusive and universalist Christianity, which affirms the goodness in other religions, and the impact this has on his congregation.

It was produced at the Humana Festival of New American Plays (Louisville, Kentucky) in 2014 and premiered Off-Broadway at Playwrights Horizons on August 28, 2015 (previews), closing on October 25, 2015. Directed by Les Waters, the cast featured Andrew Garman as "Pastor Paul", Larry Powell as "Associate Pastor Joshua", Linda Powell as "Elizabeth", Phillip Kerr as "Elder Jay", and Emily Donahoe as "The Congregant". The play made its Chicago premiere at Steppenwolf Theatre Company on December 1, 2016, directed by K. Todd Freeman. The Chicago Sun-Times reviewer called it a "thought-provoking play". Subsequently, it premiered in the San Francisco Bay Area at San Francisco Playhouse on January 24, 2017, directed by Bill English.

The play was nominated for two 2016 Drama Desk Awards: Outstanding Play and Outstanding Actor in a Play for Andrew Garman. The play was nominated for the 2016 Outstanding Play and Outstanding Lead Actor in a Play for Garman. The play also won the 2016 Outstanding New Off-Broadway Play.

== Works ==
- Death Tax, 2012, 36th Humana Festival of New American Plays (Actors Theatre of Louisville); 2013, Royal Court Theatre (London)
- A Public Reading of an Unproduced Screenplay About the Death of Walt Disney, 2013, Soho Rep (Off-Broadway)
- Isaac's Eye, 2013, Ensemble Studio Theatre (Off-Broadway)
- Red Speedo, 2013, Studio Theater (Washington, DC); 2016, New York Theatre Workshop (Off-Broadway); 2020, Overlook Press, ISBN 9781468310849
- The Christians, 2014, 38th Humana Festival of New American Plays (Actors Theatre of Louisville); 2015, Playwrights Horizons (Off-Broadway); 2016, Overlook Press, ISBN 9781468310832
- Hillary and Clinton, 2016, Victory Gardens Theater (Chicago); 2019, John Golden Theatre (Broadway)
- A Doll's House, Part 2, 2017, South Coast Repertory (Santa Mesa, CA); 2017, John Golden Theatre (Broadway)
- Dana H., 2019, Kirk Douglas Theatre (Los Angeles, CA); 2021, Lyceum Theatre (Broadway)
- The Thin Place, 2019, 43rd Humana Festival of New American Plays (Actors Theatre of Louisville); Playwrights Horizons (Off-Broadway)
- The Courtship of Anna Nicole Smith (audio short play), 2020, Playing on Air
- A Simulacrum, 2023, Atlantic Theater Company - Stage 2 (New York/Off-Off-Broadway)
- Tartuffe, 2025, New York Theatre Workshop (Off-Broadway)

== Awards and honors ==
- 2018 Windham–Campbell Literature Prize in Drama
- 2017 Steinberg Playwright Award ("Mimi" Award), with a $50,000 monetary award
- 2015 Whiting Award
- 2016 Obie Award for Playwriting for The Christians
- 2016 Joseph Kesselring Prize for The Christians
- 2015 Guggenheim Fellowship
- 2012 Whitfield Cook Award for Isaacs Eye
- Two Harold and Mimi Steinberg/ATCA New Play Award Citations (2013 for Death Tax, 2015 for The Christians)
