= Hillary and Clinton =

2016 play

- 2019 Broadway playbill cover
- Written by: Lucas Hnath
- Characters: Hillary Clinton; Bill Clinton; Mark Penn; "The Other Guy" (Note: In the original Chicago production, Barack Obama was not referred to by name in the play, only as "The Other Guy". In the Broadway production, the character is referred to by name.)
- Original language: English

Premiere
- Date premiered: April 1, 2016
- Place premiered: Victory Gardens Theater, Chicago
- Official website

Hillary and Clinton is a stage play written by Lucas Hnath that premiered in 2016 at the Victory Gardens Theater in Chicago. The play is set in an alternate universe and tells a story centering on Hillary Clinton's 2008 presidential campaign.

After one month of previews, the play opened on Broadway on April 18, 2019, at the John Golden Theatre. The Broadway production starred Laurie Metcalf as Hillary Clinton and John Lithgow as Bill Clinton.

== Development ==
Hillary and Clinton was written by Lucas Hnath in 2008. Hnath drew inspiration for the play from watching the 2008 Iowa Democratic presidential caucuses and how the caucus was conducted, as well as from watching a segment of a voter question to Hillary Clinton a few days afterwards. Hnath described it as "a play about the Clintons that's not a play about the Clintons." During its development stage, the play was workshopped at Victory Gardens Theater's Ignition Festival of New Plays in 2014 and then at the Cape Cod Theatre Project in 2015. The first read-through for the Victory Gardens Theater production took place in March 2016. Hnath had asked the original production team not to attempt to cast actors who resembled the real-life individuals they were to play, as he did not want the character portrayals to come across as impressions.

== Productions ==
Hillary and Clinton premiered at the Victory Gardens Theater in Chicago, where it was directed by Chay Yew and ran from April 1 to May 1, 2016. Subsequent productions were staged in theaters in Philadelphia, Richmond, and Dallas. In all of these pre-Broadway productions, Hillary Clinton was portrayed by African-American women.

=== Broadway ===
A Broadway production of Hillary and Clinton was announced in October 2018, and The Hollywood Reporter reported that the play had gone through major changes since its original run. The Broadway production was directed by Joe Mantello and starred Laurie Metcalf as Hillary Clinton and John Lithgow as Bill Clinton. It was produced by Scott Rudin, with set design by Chloe Lamford, costume design by Ann Roth, and lighting design by Hugh Vanstone.

Previews began on March 16, 2019, at the John Golden Theatre with the official opening on April 18. It was the first Broadway play to feature Hillary Clinton as a leading character.

The play closed on June 23, 2019. It was originally scheduled to close on July 21, 2019, but on June 18, 2019, it was announced the show was closing early due to poor ticket sales.

== Synopsis ==
The play takes place in an alternate universe and centers on a woman named Hillary Clinton who is running for President of the United States in 2008. A few days before the New Hampshire primary, Clinton is in her hotel room trying to turn her struggling campaign around. Her campaign manager Mark advises her to concede the primary race and accept her opponent's offer to be his running mate. Against Mark's advice, Clinton turns to her husband Bill for assistance, but the two disagree on how much vulnerability Clinton must show to win over voters.

== Cast ==
Character	Original Chicago cast	Broadway cast
Hillary Clinton	Cheryl Lynn Bruce	Laurie Metcalf
Bill Clinton	John Apicella	John Lithgow
Mark Penn	Keith Kupferer	Zak Orth
Barack Obama ("The Other Guy")	Juan Francisco Villa	Peter Francis James

== Reception ==
Critical reception to the original Chicago production was mixed. Writing for the Chicago Tribune, Chris Jones praised Hnath's "audacious, whip-smart, highly entertaining" writing but was disappointed with the casting choices. The New York Times's Charles Isherwood found the play to be overly restrained, while The Economist felt that Hillary and Clinton was at its "most interesting" when it looked at the political demands Hillary Clinton has had to deal with due to her gender.

== Awards and nominations ==
=== Broadway ===
Year	Award	Category	Nominee	Result	Ref.
2019	Tony Awards	Best Actress in a Play	Laurie Metcalf	Nominated	
2019	Drama Desk Award	Best Actress in a Play	Laurie Metcalf	Nominated	
2019	Drama League Awards	Distinguished Performance	Laurie Metcalf	Nominated	
