= The Other Place (play) =

Play written by Sharr White

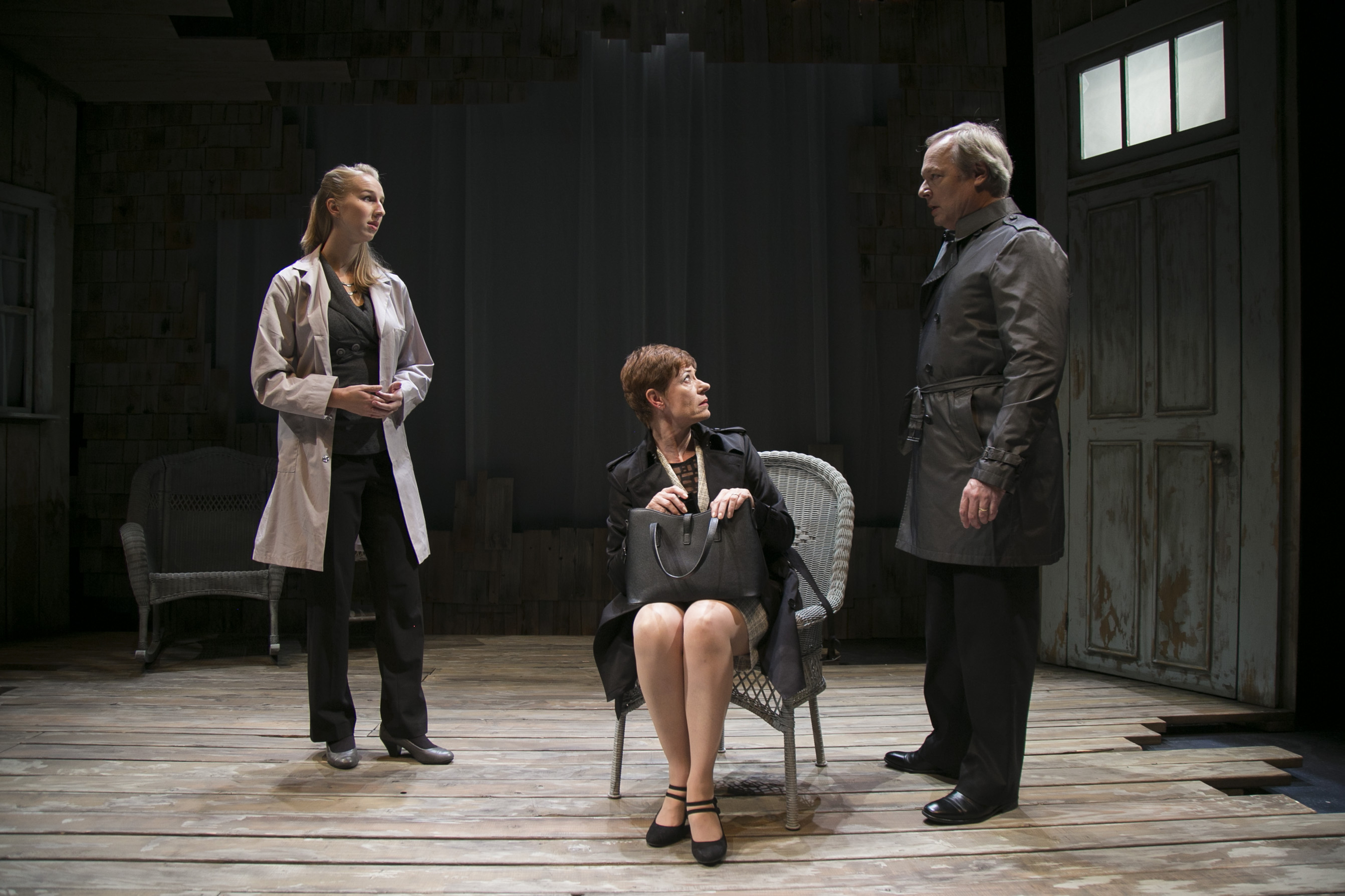
Scene from a 2016 production of The Other Place

The Other Place is a play by American playwright Sharr White. The play premiered Off-Broadway in 2011 and then ran on Broadway.

== Productions ==
The Other Place had its world premiere Off-Broadway in an MCC Theater production at the Lucille Lortel Theatre on March 28, 2011, in a limited run that ended May 1, 2011. Directed by Joe Mantello, the cast starred Laurie Metcalf and Dennis Boutsikaris.

The play then had its West Coast premiere at the Magic Theatre in San Francisco, California on September 12, 2012, in a limited run that ended October 14, 2012. Directed by Loretta Greco, the cast starred Henny Russell (as Juliana Smithton) and Donald Sage Mackay, with Carrie Paff, and Patrick Russell.

The play had its Broadway premiere in a Manhattan Theatre Club production at the Samuel J. Friedman Theatre on January 10, 2013 and closed on March 3, 2013 after 34 previews and 61 performances. The cast starred Laurie Metcalf and Daniel Stern, and was directed by Joe Mantello.

The Other Place received two Outer Critics Circle Award nominations, for Outstanding New Off-Broadway Play and Outstanding Actress In A Play (Laurie Metcalf). Laurie Metcalf won an Obie Award, Performance. Metcalf was nominated for the 2013 Tony Award, Best Performance by an Actress in a Leading Role in a Play.

It was presented at Central Square Theater in Cambridge, Massachusetts in September 2013.

The Other Place had its southeast regional premiere at Carolina Actors Studio Theatre in Charlotte, North Carolina on January 9, 2014.

== Plot summary ==
Juliana is fifty two years old and a brilliant drug-company scientist. She is giving a speech to a neurological convention. As she speaks we cut away to scenes with her doctor, phone calls from her estranged daughter, and arguments with her husband who may or may not be divorcing her. Through it all she constantly refers to "the other place", a cottage on Cape Cod that the family once owned, and a place where Juliana feels she may reunite with her missing daughter and find some peace of mind. Juliana becomes argumentative with everyone around her and appears increasingly confused. The phone calls from the missing daughter may be a delusion. Juliana believes that she has a brain tumor and says that her mother and other relatives all died of brain tumors at an early age.

Eventually Juliana actually visits the other place and encounters the current owner whom she mistakenly believes to be her daughter. The woman is initially hostile and has problems of her own. But soon the two women find mutual comfort as Juliana's husband arrives to take her home. In a poignant closing monologue she finally confronts what is really going on.

== Awards and nominations ==
=== Original Off-Broadway production ===
Year	Award	Category	Nominee	Result
2011	Obie Award	Distinguished Performance by an Actress	Laurie Metcalf	Won
2011	Outer Critics Circle Award	Outstanding New Broadway Play		Nominated
2011	Outer Critics Circle Award	Outstanding Actress in a Play	Laurie Metcalf	Nominated

=== Original Broadway production ===
Year	Award	Category	Nominee	Result
2013	Tony Award	Best Actress in a Play	Laurie Metcalf	Nominated
