= Horace and Pete =

American comedy-drama web series

- Genre: Tragicomedy
- Created by: Louis C.K.
- Written by: Louis C.K.
- Directed by: Louis C.K.
- Starring: Louis C.K.; Steve Buscemi; Edie Falco; Steven Wright; Kurt Metzger; Alan Alda; Jessica Lange
- Opening theme: "Horace and Pete" written and performed by Paul Simon
- Country of origin: United States
- Original language: English
- No. of seasons: 1
- No. of episodes: 10

Production
- Executive producers: Louis C.K.; M. Blair Breard; Dave Becky; Vernon Chatman; Dino Stamatopoulos
- Producer: Kathy Welch
- Production location: New York City
- Editor: Gina Sansom
- Camera setup: Multi-camera
- Running time: 30–67 minutes
- Production companies: Pig Newton, Inc.

Original release
- Network: louisck.com
- Release: January 30 – April 2, 2016

Horace and Pete is an American web series created, written, and directed by Louis C.K., who describes it as a tragedy. In addition to C.K., the series stars Alan Alda, Steve Buscemi, Edie Falco and Jessica Lange. Dealing with the themes of abuse, mental illness, politics and family dynamics, the series focuses on Horace (played by C.K.), Pete (Buscemi), and Sylvia (Falco), the owners of Horace and Pete's, a run-down Brooklyn bar. The first episode was released on C.K.'s website without any prior announcements on January 30, 2016. New episodes were released weekly, concluding with the tenth on April 2, 2016.

== Synopsis ==
The series is set in a run-down bar called Horace and Pete's in Brooklyn, New York. The bar was owned by the same family since 1916 and was passed down through several generations, always with a Horace and a Pete in charge. The current owners are the 49-year-old Horace Wittel VIII and his 52-year-old cousin Pete. The bar is old-fashioned and bound by tradition, serving no mixed drinks, with the only beer they sell being Budweiser on tap.

For many years, the management has been watering down the drinks, and pricing is variable, depending on whether the customer is a regular or a hipster who is drinking there "ironically". While there is a narrative concerning the relationships between the members of the family and the future of the bar, there are many scenes which take place in the bar and do not advance the main plot.

== Cast and characters ==
=== Main cast ===
- Horace Wittel VIII (Louis C.K.) is 49 years old and divorced. He is estranged from his son Horace Wittel IX, who refuses all contact with him, and has a frosty relationship with his daughter Alice. Formerly an accountant, he inherited the bar one year prior to the start of the series after the death of his abusive father, Horace Wittel VII. He carries on the tradition of the family bar but with little enthusiasm for the role. He is prone to bouts of depression, but nevertheless is quite successful at attracting women. He has good people skills and frequently becomes the peacemaker in conflict situations. However, he also has a callous streak.
- Pete Wittel (Steve Buscemi) is 52 years old and is co-owner of the bar. He was raised with Horace and Sylvia as their brother, but is their biological cousin; his biological father is Uncle Pete. As a teenager, he was handsome, athletic, and outgoing, but he was later crippled by a severe mental illness and institutionalized for several years. He is now dependent on an expensive drug called Probitol to function, and on the family bar for his livelihood. He is generally kind and concertedly respectful towards other people, especially women, but struggles with the limitations and consequences of his condition, making him sensitive to perceived criticism, especially where Horace is concerned, leading to frequent minor spats between the two.
- Sylvia Wittel (Edie Falco) is in her early fifties and is Horace's older sister. She was a rebellious and unhappy teenager, and is tough and assertive as an adult. She has a son, Franklin, who is at school, and a daughter, Brenda, who is emotional and protective of her, much to her irritation. She hates the bar and all the misery associated with it, and wants to shut it down and claim her share of the inheritance to help pay for her chemotherapy, as she has just been diagnosed with cancer. Despite this, she has a good relationship with Horace, who persuades her to become involved in the bar's management. She can also be startlingly blunt when she finds cause to criticize someone, to the point of cruelty.
- Leon (Steven Wright) is in his sixties and has been a regular at the bar for many years. A recovering alcoholic, he continues to visit the bar for companionship, drinking only apple juice. He speaks infrequently, is laconic and has a dry sense of humor. He is chivalrous and believes a man should never be rude to a woman regardless of the circumstances.
- Kurt (Kurt Metzger), a regular at the bar, is an opinionated loudmouth in his thirties. He has a nihilistic world view, and believes it would be good idea to elect Donald Trump in order to destroy the current political system. It is unclear what he does for a living or what his source of income is. He is crude and insensitive.
- Uncle Pete (Alan Alda) is about 80 years old and was the co-owner of the bar before handing over the reins to Pete after Horace VII's death. He continues to tend the bar and in effect runs it, bullying Horace and Pete and drawing his own indeterminate salary from the bar's takings. He is an acerbic, foul-mouthed bigot who insults everyone and is particularly abusive towards his family, but his rants are often a source of some entertainment to the bar's patrons. He reveals in the first episode that he is Pete's biological father (his mother is unknown). He is the only Wittel who treats Marsha as family and he sometimes shows other patrons, particularly women, a degree of warmth and respect, but is hostile towards anyone who challenges his bigoted views. Horace VIII's father Horace VII was Uncle Pete's first cousin.
- Marsha (Jessica Lange) is in her sixties and was Horace Wittel VII's last sexual partner before his death. Subsequently, Uncle Pete has continued to give her a share of the bar's takings and give her free drinks. She is a chronic alcoholic and has been drinking since her early teens, relying on her sex appeal to attract men to support her habit. She is loud and often very rude, speaking her mind without social filters.

=== Recurring and additional cast ===
- Alice Wittel (Aidy Bryant) is Horace's daughter. She is 23 years old and is nearing the end of her law studies. Horace was absent from her life for most of her childhood, and she still bitterly resents him for causing the family to break up. Unlike her brother Horace Wittel IX, who refuses all contact, she meets with her father on several occasions, but rebuffs all his attempts to bond with her. She is emotionally cold; however, she is on friendly terms with her uncle Pete.
- Tricia (Maria Dizzia) is a pleasant young woman who has Tourette syndrome, causing her to involuntarily make offensive utterances. She befriended Pete during his stay at a psychiatric hospital. When she attempts to renew their friendship Pete initially doesn't want to see her, associating her with the worst period of his life, but he relents and they eventually become romantically involved.
- Nick (Nick DiPaolo) is 49 years old and is an assistant DA. He is not particularly enthusiastic about his job and sees no prospects for advancement. He is politically conservative and often argues with other bar patrons. He is a semi-regular at the bar and sometimes picks up women there for one night stands.
- Tom (Tom Noonan), a regular at the bar, is a lugubrious man in his 60s who is a failed musician and actor. He sometimes plays the piano.
- Ricardo (Craig muMs Grant), bar patron and police officer
- Melissa (Liza Treyger)
- Carl (Greer Barnes)
- Rhonda (Karen Pittman)
- Dom (Dov Davidoff)
- Mark (Mark Normand)
- Jimmy (Colin Quinn)
- Horace IX (Angus T. Jones)
- Horace VII (Burt Young)
- Young Horace VIII (Jack Gore)
- Mara (Amy Sedaris)
- Young Silvia (Sofia Hublitz)
- Eric (Conner O'Malley)
- Sarah (Laurie Metcalf)
- George (George Wallace)
- Mike (Michael Cyril Creighton)
- Rick (Rick Shapiro)
- Maggie (Nina Arianda)
- Harold (Reg E. Cathey)
- Rachel (Rebecca Hall)
- Dr. Evers (Colman Domingo)
- Margaret (Michelle Wolf)
- Young Hipsters (Zach Cherry, Julio Torres, Paul Laudiero, Spike Einbinder)
- Magician at the Bar (David Blaine)
- Leon's Friend (Paul Simon)
- Bill de Blasio (himself)

== Production ==
=== Conception and casting ===
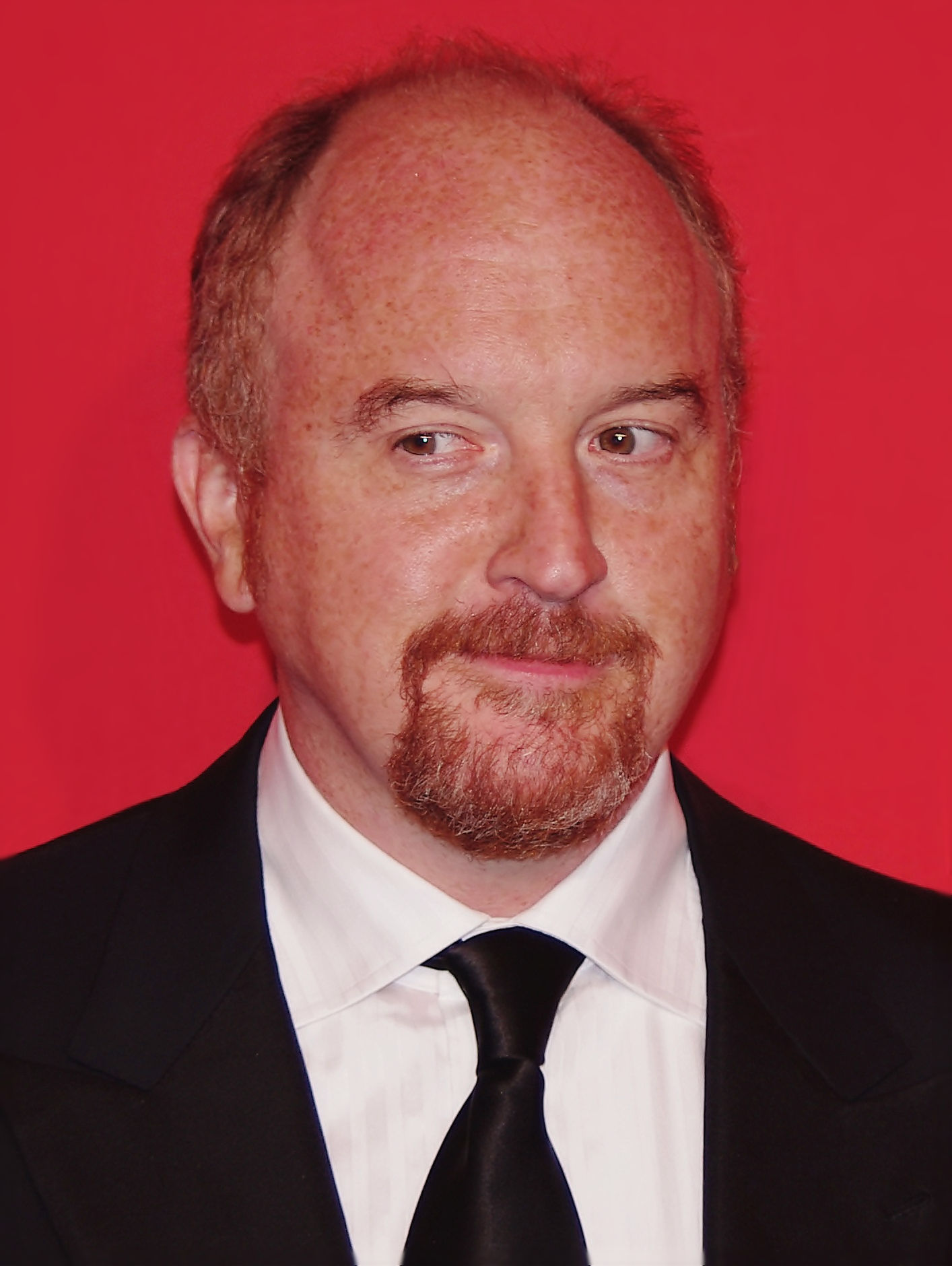
Creator Louis C.K. made the show without making any public announcements.

C.K. said that the show was inspired by Mike Leigh's 1977 play, Abigail's Party, which was written and developed using Leigh's improvisation method. It was then made into a multi-camera TV play. Abigail's Party's story takes place during the course of a night, over drinks and dinner. It is one scene over two hours. C.K. also credits playwright Annie Baker both in discussion about the show and in the credits, as he saw her play The Flick, and was influenced by her work there. She also helped him with the writing of the first few episodes.

The idea was a sitcom with no audience or laugh-track, multi-camera, shot from a stage-like perspective (i.e., from one angle). The focus would be, similar to Abigail's Party, centered on a family. Steve Buscemi came on board first, then Edie Falco and Jessica Lange. C.K. said that the cast will get a portion of the profits.

For the role of Pete Wittel, C.K. originally tried to cast Joe Pesci. In a conversation over the phone, Pesci declined the role, so C.K. went to his home to try to persuade him. After discussing the script, Pesci admitted that he liked it, yet still said no. C.K. had also offered the role to Jack Nicholson and Christopher Walken, before eventually considering and signing Alan Alda. C.K.'s character's name is a homage to the late comedian Harris Wittels, who opened for C.K. and was someone C.K. considered a talented comedian of note.

C.K. started writing the show in October 2015 and then as cast members came on board, he held rehearsals in January 2016. Sections of the show's scripts were kept intentionally blank with placeholders to insert current events, like the upcoming presidential election.

=== Funding and filming ===
C.K. said that each episode cost half a million dollars to shoot. The show was shot in a studio in New York City called NEP Penn Studios located in the Hotel Pennsylvania across from Madison Square Garden. They shot the show starting in early January 2016, with production lasting about five or six weeks. Using the look and feel of Abigail's Party, C.K. used a color-coded shot list that was created during rehearsals to enable live-switching between cameras.

The series had frequent references to current events during the barroom discussions. This was made possible by the short time between the production and release of the episodes (less than a week). A quick line-cut would enable a fast turnaround to distribution. There would be no ad breaks for commercials and no standards & practices that would restrict language. Also important to C.K., and why he did not want to release the show via a television network, was that he wanted the show to be secret and unexpected, where the audience had little to no information before viewing, which he said would have been impossible with a traditional TV show model.

The strategy was that C.K. would make the first four episodes and use the money people paid for those to fund the rest of the season. Due to lack of promotion, there was not enough money and he went into debt to fund the production of the show. After he finished production on the show, C.K. went on a promotional tour to promote the show and recoup some of the costs. C.K. said that what he was going to be doing (i.e., producing shows of varying length, using a theater-based approach to storytelling, distributing the show himself) was going to be so extreme he did not want to have funding from other sources, like FX Networks, even though notable entertainment professionals, including Lorne Michaels, strongly discouraged C.K. from doing this.

=== Music ===
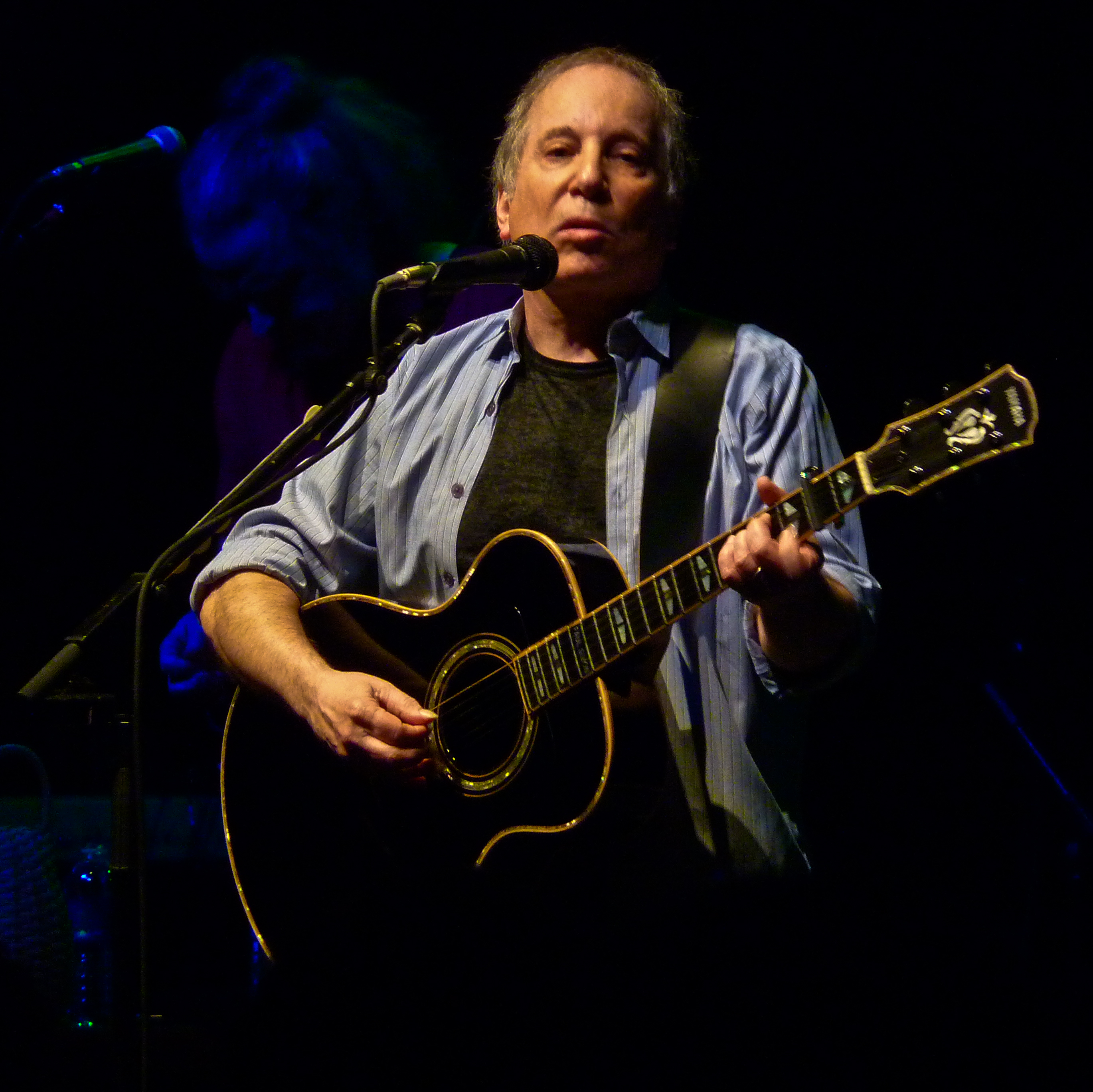
Paul Simon wrote the theme song and his music was used for the soundtrack.

The theme song was written and performed by Paul Simon. C.K. asked Simon to write the theme song via email, let Simon read all 10 scripts, and then the two went into the studio for a day to work on the song. The song was subsequently included on the deluxe edition of Simon's 2016 album, Stranger to Stranger. Simon makes a brief appearance as a customer in a flashback scene in episode 10. "America" by Simon & Garfunkel, and Dion DiMucci and Paul Simon's "New York Is My Home" are featured in different episodes of the show.

== Distribution ==
The first episode was released on January 30, 2016, with no press or previous mention. Subscribers to C.K.'s mailing list received an email notice of its availability. It is a continuation of the sell-through direct-to-consumer model that C.K. used successfully in prior releases of content.

C.K. explained that the direct-to-consumer, sell-through model of pricing the pilot at $5 would allow him to produce following episodes. On his website, he discussed the challenges of creating, shooting, and releasing a multi-camera TV show and addressed the pricing, revealing a tiered cheaper price for the remaining episodes of the show: $5 for the first episode, $2 for the next, and then $3 for the rest of the episodes. The show has a very short production-release model, as episode 2 was being shot the week following the pilot, and was released a week after the first episode was made public, with following episodes to come.

All of the ten episodes were edited by C.K.'s former Louie assistant editor Gina Sansom and had no predetermined running time, ranging in length from 30 minutes to 67 minutes. The closing credits for episode 5 include the notice: End of Act 1. At the close of episode 10, C.K. announces "That's a wrap on Horace and Pete" while the cast applaud in a kind of curtain call. Shortly after the final episode of season one was released, C.K. revealed that guest actress Amy Sedaris, a late casting decision, had developed her own character and improvised all her dialogue.

Horace and Pete's production, marketing, and distribution model sparked much debate over the strategic, financial, creative options available to content creators. C.K.'s work was compared to Kanye West as both navigate funding singular artistic visions that focus on creative control and in C.K.'s case, distribution, funding, and publicity methods outside the typical television model.

C.K., during an extensive discussion with fellow comic Marc Maron, said that he wanted to open source the process by which he created the show, transparently sharing as much information as possible so others might be able to adopt and learn from his experience.

At The New Yorker Festival, C.K. told Emily Nussbaum that he sold the show to Hulu.

== Episodes ==
No.	Title	Directed by	Written by	Original release date	Length
1	"Episode 1"	Louis C.K.	Louis C.K.	January 30, 2016	67 minutes
Horace and Pete have a petty argument before opening the bar. Regular customers Leon, Kurt, Nick and Marsha arrive and argue about politics and sport. Horace tries to ask Uncle Pete not to attend the afternoon's meeting with Sylvia and her lawyer over the future of the bar, fearing he will inflame the situation, but this only infuriates him. Horace has been trying to contact his daughter Alice all day when she unexpectedly visits. She rebuffs his attempts to connect with her, and declines his offer to let her stay at the upstairs apartment despite having accommodation problems. Pete has been acting strangely all day; he can no longer afford to take his expensive medication due to an insurance mix-up. He has a meltdown and scares away most of the customers. An accountant (Peter Benson) who was sent by Sylvia's lawyer asks some awkward questions about the bar's finances. Sylvia arrives with her lawyer (Stephen Wallem) and gives notice that she intends to sue the bar for her share of the inheritance and to sell it. Uncle Pete reveals that he is Pete's true father, but he gave him up to be raised by Horace's father. Amid the bickering, Pete unexpectedly becomes the voice of reason. Horace abruptly asks his girlfriend Rachel (Rebecca Hall) to move out.
2	"Episode 2"	Louis C.K.	Louis C.K.	February 6, 2016	51 minutes
Horace is awakened by Marsha, who flirts with him; it later becomes clear that this is Horace's strange sexual fantasy. Horace and Pete talk about the afterlife over breakfast. Marsha brings Dennis the tire store entrepreneur (Jack O'Connell) into the bar on a date. Sylvia tells Horace she has breast cancer, and reveals she wants to sell the bar to pay medical bills. Horace goes to lunch with Alice. They are starting to get on better until he explains that he kicked out Rachel so that she could move in. She again declines his offer. Horace goes upstairs and has another strange fantasy about Marsha. Meanwhile in the bar, Dennis is becoming frustrated with Marsha – he wants to take her out on the town, she just wants to sit in the bar and drink. He finally admits that he is married. Pete is visited by Tricia, a woman with Tourette syndrome he met while he was in a psychiatric hospital.
3	"Episode 3"	Louis C.K.	Louis C.K.	February 13, 2016	43 minutes
Horace's ex-wife Sarah (Laurie Metcalf), who is eleven years his senior, visits the bar. She confides in Horace, describing in vivid detail the events which led to her having an affair with her new husband's fit and active 84-year-old father. She is hoping that Horace, who cheated on her with her sister, will be able to relate to her situation. Horace tells her that her affair is certain to be discovered, that it will certainly cause a great deal of hurt and will certainly lead to the end of her marriage; however she will be unable to stop doing it.
4	"Episode 4"	Louis C.K.	Louis C.K.	February 20, 2016	30 minutes
Horace is depressed and taciturn; Uncle Pete suggests he needs some casual sex. Horace makes a booty call to Maggie (Nina Arianda), a former sexual partner who used to work at the bar. Since they last met, she impulsively married a pilot, who later died suddenly. Maggie starts to make out with Horace, but he is so depressed that she no longer wants to have sex with him. Pete and Uncle Pete talk about Horace and Maggie; Pete says Maggie liked him for his cunnilingus skills. Uncle Pete is disgusted – he strongly believes that a man should not take a subservient role during sex. Pete and Uncle Pete have a discussion about sex and love.
5	"Episode 5"	Louis C.K.	Louis C.K.	February 27, 2016	33 minutes
The family hold a wake in the bar for Uncle Pete, who had recently committed suicide. Marsha talks about her early life; she has been a heavy drinker since the age of 13, and was eventually "adopted" by Horace senior. The family are no longer willing to support her and she leaves the bar. Sylvia's illness has resulted in tensions between her and her daughter Brenda; when Brenda tries to support her Sylvia snaps and orders her to leave. Pete begs Horace and Sylvia not to sell the bar; he is dependent on the bar for his livelihood. However, Sylvia is intent on selling the bar to pay for her cancer treatment. Horace suggests as a compromise that Sylvia become involved in managing the bar as a co-owner.
6	"Episode 6"	Louis C.K.	Louis C.K.	March 5, 2016	37 minutes
Pete goes on a date with Jenny (Hannah Dunne), a woman he made contact with on a dating website. She turns out to be much younger than she claimed in her profile. She explains that she prefers older men, but not the kind of older men who prefer younger women. The date starts awkwardly due to Pete's discomfort at dating a much younger woman, but they warm to each other and begin a romantic relationship. Jenny comes to have dinner at the apartment and meets Horace and Sylvia (it is apparent that Sylvia has agreed to take a role in managing the bar and moved into the apartment). Sylvia and Horace sabotage their relationship by revealing Pete's mental illness and his flaws, done by Horace inadvertently out of mishandled concern and maliciously by Sylvia because she disliked Jenny at first sight. Jenny berates Sylvia and Horace as horrible people and walks out.
7	"Episode 7"	Louis C.K.	Louis C.K.	March 12, 2016	50 minutes
Pete has a discussion with Ricardo Vonn, a childhood friend who is now a NYPD officer detailed to guard the mayor. Pete wants help to have the bar declared a landmark by the Mayor's office, so that Sylvia has more difficulty selling it. Horace's daughter Alice visits the bar with her boyfriend Eric (Conner O'Malley); awkward conversation ensues. Horace meets a woman named Rhonda (Karen Pittman) at the bar. She spends the night with him. The next morning, Rhonda suggests (but never confirms) that she might be a trans woman. Horace isn't sure if she is joking, but is forced to consider his own attitudes towards transgender people. During the conversation Horace tells Rhonda that his two children were born at about the same time, one to his wife Sarah and the other to her younger sister Rosemary. Sylvia gets good news regarding test results related to her cancer treatment.
8	"Episode 8"	Louis C.K.	Louis C.K.	March 19, 2016	35 minutes
Sylvia, Horace and their overnight guests (Harold (Reg E. Cathey) and Rhonda, respectively) are awkwardly introduced to each other in the morning. Horace and Pete visit Pete's doctor (Colman Domingo), who tells them that Pete's medication has organ-damaging side effects that can no longer allow its usage, and that Pete's mental illness will return thus requiring him to be committed anew in 1 month. Pete is devastated. Pete explains to Horace how terrible his life is when he is off his medication and hallucinating. Tricia comes to visit Pete and offers him support when he talks about his fears of going off the medicine and his thoughts of suicide.
9	"Episode 9"	Louis C.K.	Louis C.K.	March 26, 2016	36 minutes
Leon asks Horace about Pete, and Horace says that he has been missing for a week. Later, Horace gets a disturbing phone call and visits Tricia in the hospital. She has been severely beaten by Pete, who Horace says has no previous history of violence. She had attempted to wean him off his medication, naively believing that their mutual love would see them through. Back at the bar, Horace is very upset about Pete's disappearance and rants at Leon; when Kurt attempts to joke about it Horace physically attacks him. Mayor Bill de Blasio (played by himself) pays an unexpected visit to the bar. Horace retires to Pete's room and weeps. An imaginary conversation takes place in the bar between Pete and Uncle Pete; this suggests that Pete is still alive somewhere, and in his head he is trying to work through unresolved issues with his biological father.
10	"Episode 10"	Louis C.K.	Story by : Louis C.K. & Vernon Chatman; Teleplay by : Louis C.K.	April 2, 2016	54 minutes
The first half of the episode is set in 1976. Horace senior (Louis C.K.) is abusive and controlling towards his wife Marianne (Edie Falco) and children. In the bar, current events such as Jimmy Carter's candidacy for the Presidency are discussed. Marianne finally walks out on her husband after years of abuse taking Sylvia (Sofia Hublitz) and Horace (Jack Gore), but leaving Pete (Nolan Lyons) behind. The second half of the episode is set in the present. Ricardo informs Horace and Sylvia that the police will call off the search for Pete because he is almost certainly dead. Sylvia announces that she intends to leave the bar and live with Harold, and challenges Horace to make a decision about his own future. An eccentric and extraverted woman named Mara (Amy Sedaris) lifts Horace's mood when she interviews for a job. Horace tells Sylvia he knows what he wants to do with his life now and tacitly agrees he's done with the bar. Pete returns to H&P's and picks up a knife. Sylvia screams as Pete kills Horace. The bar is permanently shut down as a pair of city workers talk about its now-finished legacy. As Sylvia prepares to leave with Harold, Horace's son Horace IX (Angus T. Jones) comes to the bar and asks about his father. Sylvia says there was nothing distinctive about Horace, he was "no kind of man", then breaks down in tears.

== Reception ==
=== Critical response ===
Critics have been generally positive towards Horace and Pete, with a consensus and praise that the show feels like a filmed stage play. It was favorably compared to Playhouse 90, with critic Matt Zoller Seitz from Vulture calling it "aggressively classical". The show has been described as being filmed live, with a realism that reflects technical imperfections that add to subtle moments by a cast of veteran actors. James Poniewozik of The New York Times called it a "messy experiment that stays just on the good side of pretentiousness. But it's also probing, engaged and moving."

Entertainment Weekly's Ray Rahman said of the performances, "Alda is magnetic as he descends into sadness, while Falco injects Horace and Pete with tissue-worthy emotion. Buscemi is masterfully Buscemi-ian, and C.K. has only gotten better at making shame-filled frowny faces." Alan Sepinwall from HitFix declared Laurie Metcalf's performance the "year's best".

Filmmaker Stephen Cone gave significant praise to the series in terms of Louis C.K.'s hybridization of film, TV, and theater, comparing him to French film director Alain Resnais and stating: "Leave it to Louis C.K. to save cinema – whatever that means – with a goddamn web series." Seitz focused on the show's unique use of silence, in part a noted homage to a quote by recently deceased Garry Shandling on how there is value and meaning to be had in silence.

Review aggregator Rotten Tomatoes sampled 23 reviewers and judged 96% of the reviews to be positive. With a mean score of 8.7/10, the site's consensus states, "Horace and Pete creator Louis C.K. uses his signature blend of awkward humor – and brilliant performances from a top-notch cast – to pull off an engagingly ambitious experiment in TV tragicomedy." On Metacritic the series has a score of 78 out of 100, based on 12 critics, indicating "generally favorable reviews".

=== Accolades ===
In 2016, Louis C.K. entered the series in the drama category for the 68th Primetime Emmy Awards. Lead actors C.K. and Steve Buscemi, supporting actors Alan Alda, Steven Wright, Kurt Metzger, Jessica Lange and Edie Falco, and guest stars Laurie Metcalf and Aidy Bryant were reportedly submitted for nomination by C.K. Nominations were announced in July 2016 and the series received two nominations: Laurie Metcalf for Outstanding Guest Actress in a Drama Series and Gina Sansom for Outstanding Multi-Camera Picture Editing for a Comedy Series.

Horace and Pete won the Peabody Award in 2016; the original announcement began: "Horace and Pete is a true original, a melding of contemporary politics and serialized storytelling with a throwback approach to in-studio drama harkening back to 1950s television."
