= Drama Desk Award for Outstanding Actress in a Play =

Theatre award

- Awarded for: Outstanding Actress in a Play
- Location: New York City
- Country: United States
- Presented by: Drama Desk
- First award: 1975
- Final award: 2022
- Website: dramadesk.org (defunct)

The Drama Desk Award for Outstanding Actress in a Play was an annual award presented by Drama Desk in recognition of achievements in the theatre across collective Broadway, off-Broadway and off-off-Broadway productions in New York City. The award was one of eight new acting awards first presented in 1975, when Drama Desk retired an earlier award that had made no distinction between work in plays and musicals, nor between actors and actresses, nor between lead performers and featured performers.

After the 2022 ceremony, all eight acting categories introduced in 1975 were retired. The award for Outstanding Actress in a Play, along with Outstanding Actor in a Play, were replaced in 2023 with the gender neutral category of Outstanding Lead Performance in a Play.

== Winners and nominees ==
Key

and bold indicates the winner.

=== 1970s ===
Year	Actress	Play	Character
1975
1975	**Ellen Burstyn**	**Same Time, Next Year**	**Doris**
1975	Elizabeth Ashley	Cat on a Hot Tin Roof	Maggie
1975	Female Ensemble	Women Behind Bars	Female Ensemble
1975	Tovah Feldshuh	Yentl	Yentl
1975	Rita Moreno	The Ritz	Googie Gomez
1975	Diana Rigg	The Misanthrope	Celimene
1975	Maggie Smith	Private Lives	Amanda Prynne
1975	Liv Ullmann	A Doll's House	Nora Helmer
1976
1976	**Rosemary Harris**	**The Royal Family**	**Julie Cavendish**
1976	Fran Brill	What Every Woman Knows	Maggie Wylie
1976	Tovah Feldshuh	Yentl	Yentl
1976	Lois Nettleton	They Knew What They Wanted	Amy
1976	Meryl Streep	27 Wagons Full of Cotton, A Memory of Two Mondays, Secret Service and Trelawny of the 'Wells'	Various Characters
1977
1977	**Irene Worth**	**The Cherry Orchard**	**Ranevskaya**
1977	Trazana Beverley	For Colored Girls	Lady in Red
1977	Blythe Danner	The New York Idea	Cynthia Karslake
1977	Cara Duff-MacCormick	The Philanderer	Julia Craven
1977	Diane Ladd	Lu Ann Hampton Laverly	Lu Ann Hampton
1977	Sofia Landon	Peg o' My Heart	Peg
1977	Dorothy McGuire	The Night of the Iguana	Hannah
1978
1978	**Jessica Tandy**	**The Gin Game**	**Fonsia Dorsey**
1978	Helen Burns	Catsplay	Mrs. Bela Orban
1978	Patricia Elliott	Tartuffe	Dorine
1978	Tammy Grimes	Tartuffe	Elmire
1978	Carol Mayo Jenkins	Zinnia	Zinnia
1978	Shirley Knight	Landscape of the Body	Betty
1979
1979	**Constance Cummings**	**Wings**	**Emily Stilson**
1979	**Carole Shelley**	**The Elephant Man**	**Madge Kendal**
1979	Kate Reid	Bosoms and Neglect	Henny
1979	Frances Sternhagen	On Golden Pond	Ethel Thayer
1979	Susan Stevens	The Price of Genius	Unknown

=== 1980s ===
Year	Actress	Play	Character
1980
1980	**Pat Carroll**	**Gertrude Stein**	**Gertrude Stein**
1980	Blythe Danner	Betrayal	Emma
1980	Phyllis Frelich	Children of a Lesser God	Sarah Norman
1980	Mary Tyler Moore	Whose Life Is it Anyway?	Claire
1980	Susan Sarandon	A Coupla White Chicks Sitting Around Talking	Maude Mix
1981
1981	**Joan Copeland**	**The American Clock**	**Rose Baum**
1981	Eva Le Gallienne	To Grandmother's House We Go	Grandie
1981	Mary Beth Hurt	Crimes of the Heart	Meg MaGrath
1981	Amanda Plummer	A Taste of Honey	Josephine
1981	Elizabeth Taylor	The Little Foxes	Regina Giddens
1982
1982	**Zoe Caldwell**	**Medea**	**Medea**
1982	Barbara Bryne	Entertaining Mr Sloane	Kath
1982	Constance Cummings	The Chalk Garden	Mrs. St. Maugham
1982	Elizabeth Franz	Sister Mary Ignatius Explains It All for You	Sister Mary Ignatius
1982	Bernadette Peters	Sally and Marsha	Sally
1983
1983	**Jessica Tandy**	**Foxfire**	**Annie Nations**
1983	Suzanne Bertish	Skirmishes	Jean
1983	Colleen Dewhurst	Queen and the Rebels	Argia
1983	Thuli Dumakude	Poppie Nongena	Poppie
1983	Christine Estabrook	Win/Lose/Draw	Various Characters
1983	Susan Sarandon	Extremities	Marjorie
1984
1984	**Joan Allen**	**And a Nightingale Sang**	**Hellen Stott**
1984	Rosemary Harris	Heartbreak House	Hesione Hushabye
1984	Kate Nelligan	A Moon for the Misbegotten	Josie Hogan
1984	Natsuko Ohama	Sound and Beauty	Woman
1984	Marilyn Rockafellow	Open Admissions	Ginny Carlsen
1984	Irene Worth	The Golden Age	Isabel Hastings Hoyt
1985
1985	**Rosemary Harris**	**Pack of Lies**	**Barbara Jackson**
1985	Stockard Channing	A Day in the Death of Joe Egg	Sheila
1985	Roxanne Hart	Digby	Faye
1985	Lynn Redgrave	Aren't We All?	Mrs. W. Tatham
1985	Elizabeth Wilson	Salonika	Enid
1986
1986	**Lily Tomlin**	**The Search for Signs of Intelligent Life in the Universe**	**Various Characters**
1986	Joan Allen	The Marriage of Bette and Boo	Bette Brennan
1986	Stockard Channing	The House of Blue Leaves	Bunny Flingus
1986	Judith Ivey	Precious Sons	Bea
1986	Swoosie Kurtz	The House of Blue Leaves	Bananas Shaughnessy
1986	Kathryn Pogson	Aunt Dan and Lemon	Lemon
1987
1987	**Linda Lavin**	**Broadway Bound**	**Kate Jerome**
1987	Robin Bartlett	The Early Girl	Jean
1987	Lindsay Duncan	Les Liaisons Dangereuses	Marquise de Merteuil
1987	Dana Ivey	Driving Miss Daisy	Daisy Werthan
1987	Amy Madigan	The Lucky Spot	Sue Jack
1987	Dianne Wiest	Hunting Cockroaches	Anka
1988
1988	**Stockard Channing**	**Woman in Mind**	**Susan**
1988	Kathy Bates	Frankie and Johnny in the Clair de Lune	Frankie
1988	Amy Irving	The Road to Mecca	Elsa
1988	Glenda Jackson	Macbeth	Lady Macbeth
1988	E. Katherine Kerr	Laughing Wild	Woman
1988	Gordana Rashovich	Shayna Maidel	Luisa
1989
1989	**Pauline Collins**	**Shirley Valentine**	**Shirley Valentine**
1989	Joan Allen	The Heidi Chronicles	Heidi Holland
1989	Robin Bartlett	Reckless	Rachel
1989	Colleen Dewhurst	Long Day's Journey into Night	Mary Cavan Tyrone
1989	Gloria Foster	The Forbidden City	Miss Molly Hoffenburg
1989	Nancy Marchand	The Cocktail Hour	Ann

=== 1990s ===
Year	Actress	Play	Character
1990
1990	**Geraldine James**	**The Merchant of Venice**	**Portia**
1990	Mary Elizabeth Mastrantonio	Twelfth Night	Viola
1990	S. Epatha Merkerson	The Piano Lesson	Berniece
1990	Mary-Louise Parker	Prelude to a Kiss	Rita Boyle
1991
1991	**Mercedes Ruehl**	**Lost in Yonkers**	**Bella Kurnitz**
1991	Stockard Channing	Six Degrees of Separation	Ouisa Kittredge
1991	Angela Goethals	The Good Times Are Killing Me	Edna Arkins
1991	Audra Lindley	About Time	Old Woman
1992
1992	**Laura Esterman**	**Marvin's Room**	**Bessie**
1992	Jane Alexander	The Visit	Claire Zachanassian
1992	Glenn Close	Death and the Maiden	Paulina Salas Escobar
1992	Deborah Hedwall	Sight Unseen	Patricia
1993
1993	**Jane Alexander**	**The Sisters Rosensweig**	**Sara Goode**
1993	Juliana Carneiro da Cunha	Les Atrides	Clytemnestra
1993	Christine Lahti	Three Hotels	Barbara Hoyle
1993	Debra Monk	Redwood Curtain	Geneva Riordan
1993	Natasha Richardson	Anna Christie	Anna Christopherson
1994
1994	**Myra Carter**	**Three Tall Women**	**A**
1994	Kathleen Chalfant	Angels in America: Perestroika	Various Characters
1994	Amy Irving	Broken Glass	Sylvia Gellburg
1994	Diana Rigg	Medea	Medea
1994	Joan Rivers	Sally Marr...and Her Escorts	Sally Marr
1994	Harriet Walter	Three Birds Alighting on a Field	Biddy
1995
1995	**Cherry Jones**	**The Heiress**	**Catherine Sloper**
1995	Mary Alice	Having Our Say	Bessie Delany
1995	Stockard Channing	Hapgood	Mother
1995	Linda Lavin	Death Defying Acts	Dorothy / Carol
1995	Helen Mirren	A Month in the Country	Natalia Petrovna
1995	Mercedes Ruehl	The Rose Tattoo	Serafina Delle Rose
1996
1996	**Zoe Caldwell**	**Master Class**	**Maria Callas**
1996	Catherine Byrne	Molly Sweeney	Molly
1996	Uta Hagen	Mrs. Klein	Mrs. Klein
1996	Lisa Gay Hamilton	Valley Song	Veronica
1996	Rosemary Harris	A Delicate Balance	Agnes
1996	Sarah Jessica Parker	Sylvia	Sylvia
1997
1997	**Janet McTeer**	**A Doll's House**	**Nora Helmer**
1997	Jayne Atkinson	The Skriker	The Skriker
1997	Frances Conroy	The Rehearsal	The Countess
1997	Shirley Knight	The Young Man From Atlanta	Lily Dale Kidder
1997	Vanessa Redgrave	Antony and Cleopatra	Cleopatra
1997	Lia Williams	Skylight	Kyra Hollis
1998
1998	**Cherry Jones**	**Pride's Crossing**	**Mabel**
1998	Edie Falco	Side Man	Terry
1998	Marie Mullen	The Beauty Queen of Leenane	Maureen Folan
1998	J. Smith-Cameron	As Bees In Honey Drown	Alexa
1998	Frances Sternhagen	Long Day's Journey into Night	Mary Cavan Tyrone
1999
1999	**Kathleen Chalfant**	**Wit**	**Vivian Bearing**
1999	Judi Dench	Amy's View	Esme Allen
1999	Lindsay Duncan	Ashes to Ashes	Rebecca
1999	Elizabeth Franz	Death of a Salesman	Linda Loman
1999	Swoosie Kurtz	The Mineola Twins	Myra / Myrna
1999	Zoë Wanamaker	Electra	Electra

=== 2000s ===
Year	Actress	Play	Character
2000
2000	**Eileen Heckart**	**The Waverly Gallery**	**Gladys Green**
2000	Sinéad Cusack	Our Lady of Sligo	Mai O'Hara
2000	Linda Lavin	The Tale of the Allergist's Wife	Marjorie
2000	Claudia Shear	Dirty Blonde	Jo / Mae West
2000	Lynne Thigpen	Jar the Floor	Lola
2000	Charlayne Woodard	In the Blood	Hester, La Negrita
2001
2001	**Mary-Louise Parker**	**Proof**	**Catherine**
2001	Eileen Atkins	The Unexpected Man	Woman
2001	Janie Dee	Comic Potential	Jacie Triplethree
2001	Mary Beth Fisher	Boys Get Girl	Caroline
2001	Marian Seldes	The Play About the Baby	The Woman
2001	Lili Taylor	The Dead Eye Boy	Shirley / Diane
2002
2002	**Lindsay Duncan**	**Private Lives**	**Amanda Prynne**
2002	Robin Bartlett	Everett Beekin	Sophie
2002	Anna Paquin	The Glory of Living	Lisa
2002	Sarah Jessica Parker	Wonder of the World	Cass
2002	Mercedes Ruehl	The Goat, or Who Is Sylvia?	Stevie
2002	Meryl Streep	The Seagull	Arkadina
2003
2003	**Vanessa Redgrave**	**Long Day's Journey into Night**	**Mary Cavan Tyrone**
2003	Jayne Atkinson	Enchanted April	Lotty Wilton
2003	Marylouise Burke	Kimberly Akimbo	Kimberly
2003	Claire Higgins	Vincent in Brixton	Ursula Loyler
2003	Dael Orlandersmith	Yellowman	Alma
2003	Fiona Shaw	Medea	Medea
2004
2004	**Viola Davis**	**Intimate Apparel**	**Esther**
2004	**Phylicia Rashad**	**A Raisin in the Sun**	**Lena Younger**
2004	Eileen Atkins	The Retreat from Moscow	Alice
2004	Shannon Cochran	Bug	Agnes White
2004	Lizan Mitchell	The Trojan Women	Hecuba
2004	J. Smith-Cameron	Sarah, Sarah	Sarah
2005
2005	**Cherry Jones**	**Doubt**	**Sister Aloysius Beauvier**
2005	Veanne Cox	Last Easter	June
2005	Judy Kaye	Souvenir	Florence Foster Jenkins
2005	Laura Linney	Sight Unseen	Patricia
2005	Frances Sternhagen	Echoes of the War	Mrs. Dowey
2005	Kathleen Turner	Who's Afraid of Virginia Woolf?	Martha
2006
2006	**Lois Smith**	**The Trip to Bountiful**	**Carrie Watts**
2006	Margaret Colin	Defiance	Margaret
2006	Cherry Jones	Faith Healer	Grace
2006	Jennifer Jason Leigh	Abigail's Party	Beverly
2006	Jan Maxwell	Entertaining Mr Sloane	Kath
2006	Julie White	The Little Dog Laughed	Diane
2007
2007	**Eve Best**	**A Moon for the Misbegotten**	**Josie Hogan**
2007	Orlagh Cassidy	The Field	Maimie Flanagan
2007	Blythe Danner	Suddenly, Last Summer	Mrs. Venable
2007	Jennifer Mudge	Dutchman	Lula
2007	Sandra Oh	Satellites	Nina
2007	Annie Parisse	The Internationalist	Sara
2007	Meryl Streep	Mother Courage and Her Children	Mother Courage
2008
2008	**Deanna Dunagan**	**August: Osage County**	**Violet Weston**
2008	Sinéad Cusack	Rock 'n' Roll	Eleanor / Esme
2008	Frances McDormand	The Country Girl	Georgie Elgin
2008	Amy Morton	August: Osage County	Barbara Weston Fordham
2008	Fiona Shaw	Happy Days	Winnie
2008	Julie White	From Up Here	Grace
2009
2009	**Janet McTeer**	**Mary Stuart**	**Mary Stuart**
2009	Saidah Arrika Ekulona	Ruined	Mama Nadi
2009	Jane Fonda	33 Variations	Katherine Brandt
2009	Marcia Gay Harden	God of Carnage	Veronica
2009	Elizabeth Marvel	Fifty Words	Jan
2009	Jan Maxwell	Scenes from an Execution	Galactia

=== 2010s ===
Year	Actress	Play	Character
2010
2010	**Jan Maxwell**	**The Royal Family**	**Julie Cavendish**
2010	Ayesha Antoine	My Wonderful Day	Winnie Barnstairs
2010	Melissa Errico	Candida	Candida
2010	Anne Hathaway	Twelfth Night	Viola
2010	Kristen Johnston	So Help Me God!	Lily Darnley
2010	Laura Linney	Time Stands Still	Sarah Goodwin
2011
2011	**Frances McDormand**	**Good People**	**Margie Walsh**
2011	Nina Arianda	Born Yesterday	Emma 'Billie' Dawn
2011	Stockard Channing	Other Desert Cities	Polly Wyeth
2011	Laurie Metcalf	The Other Place	Juliana Smithton
2011	Michele Pawk	A Small Fire	Emily Bridges
2011	Lily Rabe	The Merchant of Venice	Portia
2012
2012	**Tracie Bennett**	**End of the Rainbow**	**Judy Garland**
2012	Sanaa Lathan	By the Way, Meet Vera Stark	Vera Stark
2012	Linda Lavin	The Lyons	Rita Lyons
2012	Jennifer Lim	Chinglish	Xi Yan
2012	Kim Martin-Cotten	A Moon for the Misbegotten	Josie Hogan
2012	Carey Mulligan	Through a Glass Darkly	Karin
2012	Joely Richardson	Side Effects	Lindy
2013
2013	**Cicely Tyson**	**The Trip to Bountiful**	**Carrie Watts**
2013	Maria Dizzia	Belleville	Abby
2013	Amy Morton	Who's Afraid of Virginia Woolf?	Martha
2013	Julia Murney	Falling	Tami
2013	Vanessa Redgrave	The Revisionist	Maria
2013	Miriam Silverman	Finks	Natalie
2014
2014	**Audra McDonald**	**Lady Day at Emerson's Bar and Grill**	**Billie Holiday**
2014	Barbara Andres	I Remember Mama	Mama
2014	Tyne Daly	Mothers and Sons	Katharine Gerard
2014	Laurie Metcalf	Domesticated	Judy Pulver
2014	J. Smith-Cameron	Juno and the Paycock	Juno Boyle
2014	Harriet Walter	Julius Caesar	Brutus
2015
2015	**Helen Mirren**	**The Audience**	**Queen Elizabeth II**
2015	Brooke Bloom	You Got Older	Mae
2015	Kathleen Chalfant	A Walk in the Woods	Irina Botvinnik
2015	Kristin Griffith	The Fatal Weakness	Ollie Espenshade
2015	Jan Maxwell	The City of Conversation	Hester Ferris
2015	Carey Mulligan	Skylight	Kyra Holis
2015	Tonya Pinkins	Rasheeda Speaking	Jaclyn Spaulding
2016
2016	**Jessica Lange**	**Long Day's Journey into Night**	**Mary Tyrone**
2016	Georgia Engel	John	Mertis
2016	Mamie Gummer	Ugly Lies the Bone	Jess
2016	Marin Ireland	Ironbound	Darja
2016	Nicola Walker	A View from the Bridge	Beatrice Carbone
2017
2017	**Laura Linney**	**The Little Foxes**	**Regina Giddens**
2017	Cate Blanchett	The Present	Anna Petrovna
2017	Laurie Metcalf	A Doll's House, Part 2	Nora Helmer
2017	Amy Ryan	Love, Love, Love	Sandra
2017	Harriet Walter	The Tempest	Prospero
2018
2018	**Glenda Jackson**	**Three Tall Women**	**A**
2018	Carrie Coon	Mary Jane	Mary Jane
2018	Denise Gough	People, Places and Things	Emma
2018	Laurie Metcalf	Three Tall Women	B
2018	Billie Piper	Yerma	Her
2019
2019	**Elaine May**	**The Waverly Gallery**	**Gladys**
2019	Midori Francis	Usual Girls	Kyeoung
2019	Zainab Jah	Boesman and Lena	Lena
2019	Laurie Metcalf	Hillary and Clinton	Hillary Clinton
2019	Heidi Schreck	What the Constitution Means to Me	Heidi

=== 2020s ===
Year	Actress	Play	Character
2020
2020	**Liza Colón-Zayas**	**Halfway Bitches Go Straight to Heaven**	**Sarge**
2020	Rose Byrne	Medea	Medea
2020	Emily Davis	Is This a Room	Reality Winner
2020	April Matthis	Toni Stone	Toni Stone
2020	Ruth Negga	Hamlet	Hamlet
2021	No awards: New York theatres shuttered, March 2020 to September 2021, due to the COVID-19 pandemic in New York City		
2022
2022	**Phylicia Rashad**	Skeleton Crew	Faye
2022	Tala Ashe	English	Elham
2022	Ruth Negga	Macbeth	Lady Macbeth
2022	Andrea Patterson	Cullud Wattah	Ainee
2022	Shannon Tyo	The Chinese Lady	Afong Moy
2022	Michelle Wilson	Confederates	Sandra

== Multiple wins ==
3 wins

- Cherry Jones

2 wins

- Zoe Caldwell
- Rosemary Harris
- Janet McTeer
- Phylicia Rashad
- Jessica Tandy
- Jessica Lange

== Multiple nominations ==
6 nominations

- Stockard Channing

5 nominations

- Laurie Metcalf

4 nominations

- Rosemary Harris
- Linda Lavin
- Cherry Jones
- Jan Maxwell

3 nominations

- Meryl Streep
- Blythe Danner
- Frances Sternhagen
- Joan Allen
- Robin Bartlett
- Lindsay Duncan
- Mercedes Ruehl
- Kathleen Chalfant
- Harriet Walter
- Vanessa Redgrave
- J. Smith-Cameron
- Laura Linney

2 nominations

- Tovah Feldshuh
- Diana Rigg
- Irene Worth
- Jessica Tandy
- Shirley Knight
- Constance Cummings
- Susan Sarandon
- Zoe Caldwell
- Elizabeth Franz
- Colleen Dewhurst
- Swoosie Kurtz
- Amy Irving
- Glenda Jackson
- Mary-Louise Parker
- Jane Alexander
- Jayne Atkinson
- Helen Mirren
- Sarah Jessica Parker
- Janet McTeer
- Sinéad Cusack
- Fiona Shaw
- Phylicia Rashad
- Julie White
- Frances McDormand
- Amy Morton
- Carey Mulligan
- Ruth Negga

== See also ==
- Laurence Olivier Award for Best Actress
- Tony Award for Best Performance by a Leading Actress in a Play
