= The Last Meeting of the Knights of the White Magnolia =

- Written by: Preston Jones
- Series: Lu Ann Hampton Laverty Oberlander, The Oldest Living Graduate
- Setting: Bradleyville, Texas, 1962. Meeting room of the "Knights of the White Magnolia" on the third floor of the Cattleman's Hotel.

The Last Meeting of the Knights of the White Magnolia is the first play in the series A Texas Trilogy by Preston Jones. Set in 1962 it follows a meeting of 'the Knights of the White Magnolia', a Ku Klux Klan-like group, with seven members.

== Production history ==
The Last Meeting of the Knights of the White Magnolia premiered at the Down Center Stage on December 4, 1973.

The three plays A Texas Trilogy were first presented together as The Bradleyville Trilogy on in 1975 at the Dallas Theater Center.

The trilogy was presented under the direction of Alan Schneider in its premier as A Texas Trilogy at the Kennedy Center in Washington, D.C.

The trilogy debuted on Broadway at the Broadhurst Theatre on September 23, 1976, directed again by Alan Schneider. It closed after a mere 20 performances on October 29, 1976. It featured the following cast:

- L. D. Alexander – Henderson Forsythe
- Colonel J. C. Kinkaid – Fred Gwynne
- Red Grover – Patrick Hines
- Olin Potts – Thomas Toner
- Skip Hampton – Graham Beckel
- Rufe Phelps – Walter Flanagan
- Ramsey Eyes – John Marriott
- Milo Crawford – Josh Mostel
- Lonnie Roy McNeil – Paul O'Keefe

== Regional theaters ==
The Last Meeting of the Knights of the White Magnolia was presented in many regional theaters in the 1970s, including a 1979 Chicago area production with a Jefferson Award-winning ensemble cast led by Lyle Talbot at the Marriott's Lincolnshire Theater. Talbot had previously starred in the play at Houston's Alley Theater.
