= Robert Whitehead (theatre producer) =

Canadian theatre producer (1916–2002)

- Born: March 3, 1916; Montreal, Quebec, Canada
- Died: June 15, 2002 (aged 86); Pound Ridge, New York, U.S.
- Occupation: Producer
- Years active: 1947–2002
- Spouses: Virginia Bolen (m. 1948; died 1965) Zoe Caldwell (m. 1968)

Robert Whitehead (March 3, 1916 – June 15, 2002) was a Canadian theatre producer. His first production was Medea, starring Judith Anderson and John Gielgud, and he won the Outer Critics Circle Award five times. He was nominated for 19 Tony and Drama Desk Awards, winning 4 Tony Awards and 5 Drama Desk Awards.

== Early life ==
Whitehead was born in Montreal on March 3, 1916. Whitehead's father owned textile mills, and his mother, Selena Mary LaBatt Whitehead, was an opera singer. Her family owned LaBatt brewery. The actor Hume Cronyn was Whitehead's cousin on the LaBatt side. The two shared a love of theatre as children.

After attending Trinity College School in Port Hope, Ontario, he moved to New York and studied acting. In 1938, he began work at the Barter Theater in Abingdon, Virginia where he worked as an actor, stage manager and built scenery.

He spent the Second World War years as an ambulance driver in North Africa and Italy.

== Theater producing career ==
After the war, Whitehead became the producer of Medea, by Robinson Jeffers. The play opened on Broadway in 1947 and starred Judith Anderson and John Gielgud. Following that production, Whitehead produced a dramatization of Crime and Punishment, also on Broadway. The two productions cemented Whitehead's reputation as a producer of successful, critically-acclaimed Broadway productions.

Whitehead's work was marked by collaborations with artist whose own careers were enhanced by their association with him. Among the playwrights Whitehead worked with were Arthur Miller, Carson McCullers, William Inge, Terence Rattigan, Friedrich Dürrenmatt, Tennessee Williams, Tom Stoppard and Terrence McNally. Among the well-known actors Whitehead cast in his productions were Lillian Gish, Julie Harris, Ethel Waters, Ralph Richardson, Kim Stanley, Helen Hayes, Alfred Lunt, Lynn Fontanne, Katharine Hepburn, Paul Scofield, Jason Robards, and Dustin Hoffman.

In 1949, Whitehead collaborated with director Harold Clurman on the Broadway production of The Member of the Wedding. Over the years, they worked on successful productions of Bus Stop, Orpheus Descending, The Waltz of the Toreadors, A Touch of the Poet, The Time of the Cuckoo and Incident at Vichy.

Whitehead had a long-term association with fellow producer Roger L. Stevens. They formed The Producers Theatre. From 1960 to 1964, Whitehead was co-artistic director of the new Repertory Theatre of Lincoln Center with Elia Kazan. Clurman was literary adviser.

In his New York Times obituary, Whitehead was referred to as "debonair and distinguished." The Guardian called him "dapper, urbane." Terrence McNally, in a 2002 New York Times piece, said he was "unarguably America's greatest living theatrical producer."

== Honors ==
In 2002, Whitehead was given a special Tony Award for Lifetime Achievement Achievement in the Theater. Whitehead and Clurman were jointly honored by the Stella Adler Studio of Action in 2002 when two adjoining studios were named for them. The Broadway League's Commercial Theater Institute gives an annual award for "Outstanding Achievement in Commercial Theater Producing" which is named for Robert Whitehead.

== Personal life ==
Whitehead's first wife, Virginia, died in 1965. In 1968, Whitehead married Zoe Caldwell. They were introduced by Cronyn. She later starred in Whitehead's production of The Prime of Miss Jean Brodie among others. Whitehead had two sons, Sam, a theater critic, and Charlie, also in theater production. They lived in Manhattan and Pound Ridge, New York.

== Broadway productions ==
- Master Class - Nov 05, 1995 - Jun 29, 1997
- Broken Glass - Apr 24, 1994 - Jun 26, 1994
- Park Your Car in Harvard Yard - Nov 07, 1991 - Feb 22, 1992
- The Speed of Darkness - Feb 28, 1991 - Mar 30, 1991
- Artist Descending a Staircase - Nov 30, 1989 - Dec 31, 1989
- A Few Good Men - Nov 15, 1989 - Jan 26, 1991
- The Petition - Apr 24, 1986 - Jun 29, 1986
- Lillian - Jan 16, 1986 - Feb 23, 1986
- Death of a Salesman - Sep 14, 1984 - Nov 18, 1984
- Death of a Salesman - Mar 29, 1984 - Jul 01, 1984
- Medea - May 2, 1982 - Jun 27, 1982
- The West Side Waltz - Nov 19, 1981 - Mar 13, 1982
- Lunch Hour - Nov 12, 1980 - Jun 28, 1981
- Betrayal - Jan 05, 1980 - May 31, 1980
- Carmelina - Apr 08, 1979 - Apr 21, 1979
- Bedroom Farce - Mar 29, 1979 - Nov 24, 1979
- No Man's Land - Nov 09, 1976 - Dec 18, 1976
- A Texas Trilogy: The Oldest Living Graduate - Sep 23, 1976 - Oct 29, 1976
- A Texas Trilogy: The Last Meeting of the Knights of the White Magnolia - Sep 22, 1976 - Oct 31, 1976
- A Texas Trilogy: Lu Ann Hampton Laverty Oberlander - Sep 21, 1976 - Oct 30, 1976
- 1600 Pennsylvania Avenue - May 4, 1976 - May 8, 1976
- A Matter of Gravity - Feb 03, 1976 - Apr 10, 1976
- Cat on a Hot Tin Roof - Sep 24, 1974 - Feb 08, 1975
- Finishing Touches - Feb 08, 1973 - Jun 30, 1973
- The Creation of the World and Other Business - Nov 30, 1972 - Dec 16, 1972
- Old Times - Nov 16, 1971 - Feb 26, 1972
- Sheep on the Runway - Jan 31, 1970 - May 2, 1970
- The Price - Feb 07, 1968 - Feb 15, 1969
- The Prime of Miss Jean Brodie - Jan 16, 1968 - Dec 14, 1968
- Where's Daddy? - Mar 02, 1966 - Mar 19, 1966
- Tartuffe - Jan 14, 1965 - May 22, 1965
- Incident at Vichy - Dec 03, 1964 - May 7, 1965
- The Changeling - Oct 29, 1964 - Dec 23, 1964
- The Physicists - Oct 13, 1964 - Nov 28, 1964
- But For Whom Charlie - Mar 12, 1964 - Jul 02, 1964
- Marco Millions - Feb 20, 1964 - Jun 18, 1964
- Foxy - Feb 16, 1964 - Apr 18, 1964
- After The Fall - Jan 23, 1964 - May 29, 1965
- A Man for All Seasons - Nov 22, 1961 - Jun 01, 1963
- Midgie Purvis - Feb 01, 1961 - Feb 18, 1961
- The Conquering Hero - Jan 16, 1961 - Jan 21, 1961
- Much Ado About Nothing - Sep 17, 1959 - Nov 07, 1959
- The Cold Wind and the Warm - Dec 08, 1958 - Mar 21, 1959
- The Man in the Dog Suit - Oct 30, 1958 - Nov 29, 1958
- Goldilocks - Oct 11, 1958 - Feb 28, 1959
- A Touch of the Poet - Oct 02, 1958 - Jun 13, 1959
- The Visit - May 5, 1958 - Nov 29, 1958
- The Waltz of the Toreadors - Mar 04, 1958 - Mar 29, 1958
- The Day the Money Stopped - Feb 20, 1958 - Feb 22, 1958
- Orpheus Descending - Mar 21, 1957 - May 18, 1957
- A Hole in the Head - Feb 28, 1957 - Jul 13, 1957
- The Waltz of the Toreadors - Jan 17, 1957 - May 11, 1957
- The Sleeping Prince - Nov 01, 1956 - Dec 22, 1956
- Major Barbara - Oct 30, 1956 - May 18, 1957
- Separate Tables - Oct 25, 1956 - Sep 28, 1957
- Tamburlaine the Great - Jan 19, 1956 - Feb 04, 1956
- Joyce Grenfell Requests the Pleasure... - Oct 10, 1955 - Dec 03, 1955
- A View From the Bridge / A Memory of Two Mondays - Sep 29, 1955 - Feb 04, 1956
- The Skin of Our Teeth - Aug 17, 1955 - Sep 03, 1955
- Bus Stop - Mar 02, 1955 - Apr 21, 1956
- The Flowering Peach - Dec 28, 1954 - Apr 23, 1955
- Portrait of a Lady - Dec 21, 1954 - Dec 25, 1954
- The Confidential Clerk - Feb 11, 1954 - May 22, 1954
- The Remarkable Mr. Pennypacker - Dec 30, 1953 - Jul 10, 1954
- The Emperor's Clothes - Feb 09, 1953 - Feb 21, 1953
- Sunday Breakfast - May 28, 1952 - Jun 08, 1952
- Four Saints in Three Acts - Apr 16, 1952 - Apr 27, 1952
- Golden Boy - Mar 12, 1952 - Apr 06, 1952
- Mrs. McThing - Feb 20, 1952 - Jan 10, 1953
- Night Music - Apr 08, 1951 - Apr 14, 1951
- The Member of the Wedding - Jan 05, 1950 - Mar 17, 1951
- Crime and Punishment - Dec 22, 1947 - Jan 24, 1948
- Medea - Oct 20, 1947 - May 15, 1948
- Heart of a City - Feb 12, 1942 - Mar 07, 1942
- Mr. Big - Sep 30, 1941 - Oct 04, 1941
- Steel - Dec 19, 1939 - Dec 30, 1939
- Cure For Matrimony - Oct 25, 1939 - Nov 25, 1939

== Awards and nominations ==
- 1996 Tony Award Best Play -Master Class - winner
- 1996 Drama Desk Award Outstanding Play -Master Class - winner
- 1994 Tony Award Best Play -Broken Glass - nominee
- 1984 Tony Award Best Reproduction -Death of a Salesman - winner
- 1984 Drama Desk Award Outstanding Revival -Death of a Salesman - winner
- 1979 Tony Award Best Play -Bedroom Farce - nominee
- 1977 Drama Desk Award Outstanding New Play (American) -A Texas Trilogy: Lu Ann Hampton Laverty Oberlander - winner
- 1977 Drama Desk Award Outstanding New Play (American) -A Texas Trilogy: The Last Meeting of the Knights of the White Magnolia - winner
- 1977 Drama Desk Award Outstanding New Play (American) -A Texas Trilogy: The Oldest Living Graduate - winner
- 1977 Drama Desk Award Outstanding New Play (Foreign) -No Man's Land - nominee
- 1968 Tony Award Best Play -The Price - nominee
- 1965 Tony Award Best Producer of a Play -Tartuffe - nominee
- 1962 Tony Award Best Play -A Man for All Seasons - winner
- 1962 Tony Award Best Producer of a Play -A Man for All Seasons - winner
- 1959 Tony Award Best Play -A Touch of the Poet - nominee
- 1959 Tony Award Best Play -The Visit - nominee
- 1957 Tony Award Best Play -The Waltz of the Toreadors - nominee
- 1957 Tony Award Best Play -Separate Tables - nominee
- 1956 Tony Award Best Play -Bus Stop - nominee
