= Would You Rather Be a Colonel with an Eagle on Your Shoulder or a Private with a Chicken on Your Knee? =

1918 song

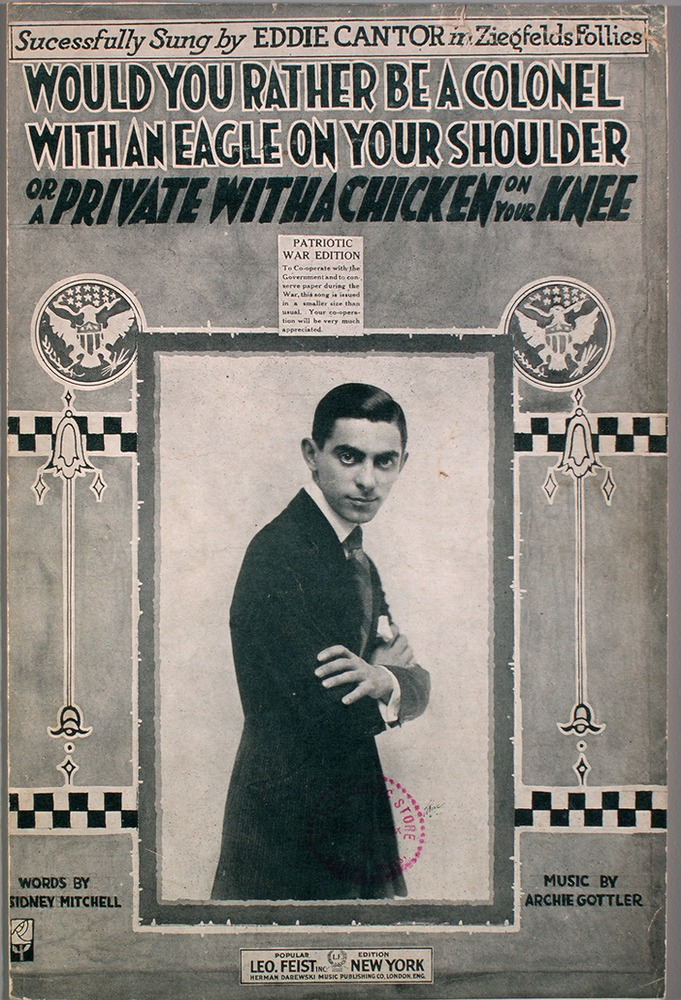
- Sheet music cover for "Would You Rather Be a Colonel with an Eagle on Your Shoulder or a Private with a Chicken on Your Knee?"

Song by Arthur Fields
- Published: 1918
- Label: Columbia Records
- Composer(s): Sidney D. Mitchell
- Lyricist(s): Archie Gottler

"Would You Rather Be a Colonel with an Eagle on Your Shoulder or a Private with a Chicken on Your Knee?" was a World War I war song by songwriter and performer Arthur Fields. Fields' version was recorded for Columbia Records in 1918.

== Composition ==
The song was composed by Sidney D. Mitchell with words by Archie Gottler. It was published by Leo Feist in 1918.

The song uses the colloquial in comparing a "bird" colonel's life to that of a private. It also expresses a common man theme that was popular with Tin Pan Alley songwriters during World War I.

== Performances ==
The song was successfully sung by Eddie Cantor in Ziegfeld's Follies in 1918. It was well suited for the follies, because the singer expresses patriotism and appreciation of beautiful women with his identification with the private in the song who has more time to appreciate women and receives more attention from them than the colonel does.

Arthur Fields' 1919 version, which was released under the pseudonym Eugene Buckley, was one of the top 100 songs of 1919.

Gordon Jenkins recorded a version of the song for Capitol Records in 1943.

Six Hits and a Miss recorded a version of the song for Capitol Records in 1943.

Bertha Wolpa recorded a version for Smithsonian Folkways.

== In popular culture ==
The song was mentioned in detail in the address of E. M. Allen, who was president of the National Association of Insurance Agents, at the Annual Meeting of the Fire Underwriters' Association of the Northwest that was held in Chicago in 1918.

The song is mentioned in Preston Jones' The Oldest Living Graduate: A Play in Two Acts.
