= Selina Fillinger =

American playwright

Selina Fillinger (born 1994) is an American playwright, TV writer, and screenwriter.

== Early life and education ==
Fillinger was born in Berkeley, California. She is Jewish. When she was three her family moved to Eugene, Oregon, where she grew up. She went to South Eugene High School before attending Northwestern University, where she studied acting and playwriting. While at Northwestern she received the first Judith Barlow Prize, an annual student award given to work inspired by a historic female playwright. She was one of three playwrights selected for Northwestern's Agnes Nixon Playwriting Festival, two years in a row.

== Career ==
During her senior year at Northwestern, Fillinger was commissioned by two local theaters, Northlight Theatre and Sideshow Theatre. Her play Faceless was produced at Northlight in January 2017 and was Fillinger's first professional production, opening only six months after she graduated. Her Sideshow commission, Something Clean, premiered at the Roundabout Underground in New York in 2019 and opened in Chicago a few months later.

Her play POTUS: Or, Behind Every Great Dumbass Are Seven Women Trying to Keep Him Alive, premiered on Broadway at the Shubert Theatre in 2022, making Fillinger, at 28, one of the youngest playwrights to be produced on Broadway. POTUS was originally in talks to be staged in the 2020 Broadway season, but was delayed by the COVID-19 pandemic. Susan Stroman directed the production, which starred Julie White, Vanessa Williams, Rachel Dratch, Lilli Cooper, Lea Delaria, Suzy Nakamura, and Julianne Hough. POTUS was the third most produced play of 2023, including productions at Berkeley Repertory Theatre, Steppenwolf Theatre, and Arena Stage.

In 2022 Fillinger joined Apple TV+’s The Morning Show as a staff writer on the third season.

== Awards and honors ==
While still a student, Fillinger won the Agnes Nixon Festival and the Judith Barlow Prize. In 2019, her play Something Clean received the Laurents/Hatcher Award and her play Cinched/Strapped won the Williamstown Theatre Festival L. Arnold Weissberger New Play Award. POTUS made the 2019 Kilroys' List and the Broadway production was nominated for three Tony Awards. Fillinger has been a Hawthornden Fellow and a resident of McCarter's Sallie B. Goodman Artist's Retreat.

== Works ==
=== Theater ===
- POTUS: Or, Behind Every Great Dumbass Are Seven Women Trying to Keep Him Alive
- Something Clean
- The Armor Plays: Cinched/Strapped
- Faceless

=== Television ===
- The Morning Show, Apple TV+, season 3
