= Inside Out (2011 film) =

Crime-drama film by Artie Mandelberg

- Theatrical release poster
- Directed by: Artie Mandelberg
- Screenplay by: Dylan Schaffer
- Produced by: Nancy Hirami; Lori Lewis; Todd Lewis; Michael Pavone
- Starring: Paul "Triple H" Levesque; Michael Rapaport; Parker Posey; Michael Cudlitz; Julie White; Bruce Dern; Jency Griffin
- Cinematography: Kenneth Zunder
- Edited by: Jerry U. Frizell
- Music by: Jim Johnston
- Production company: WWE Studios
- Distributed by: Samuel Goldwyn Films
- Release date: September 9, 2011
- Running time: 93 minutes
- Country: United States
- Language: English

Inside Out is a 2011 American crime film directed by Artie Mandelberg. The film features professional wrestler Triple H (credited as Paul "Triple H" Levesque), Michael Rapaport, Parker Posey, Julie White, Michael Cudlitz and Bruce Dern. The project was the cinematic feature film debut for director Artie Mandelberg. The film was released on September 9, 2011.

== Plot ==
A.J., an ex-con who served 13 years in Angola for manslaughter, returns home to New Orleans and fights to protect the woman he loves and her young daughter from his dangerous former best friend. In better times, AJ (Triple H) would have done anything to protect his best friend, Jack (Michael Rapaport), a two-bit gangster and the son of Dr. Vic (Bruce Dern) -- the city's toughest crime boss. While A.J. is in prison, Jack marries Claire (Parker Posey), the love of AJ's life, and together they raise a daughter, Pepper (Juliette Goglia). Pepper is A.J.'s daughter, a fact known to Jack, but Jack pretends to be her biological father. The day Jack picks up AJ from prison, the short-fused thug gets an itchy trigger finger that could land his buddy right back behind bars. The situation grows increasingly tense as Dr. Vic attempts to handle the situation quietly as he comes under investigation by the Louisiana Tax Board agent Martha (Julie White) for dealing in untaxed cigarettes. When Jack flees and Dr. Vic decides that the only way to get the job done right is to do it himself, A.J. realizes that Claire and Pepper are in mortal danger, and races to their rescue.

== Cast ==
- Paul "Triple H" Levesque as Arlo "A.J" Jayne
- Michael Rapaport as Jack Small
- Parker Posey as Claire Small
- Michael Cudlitz as Detective Calgrove
- Julie White as Martha
- Bruce Dern as Vic Small
- Logan Douglas Smith as Vic Small's attorney
- Jency Griffin as Irena
- Juliette Goglia as Pepper Small
- Patricia French as Elizabeth
- Lance E. Nichols as tax man # 3
- J. D. Evermore as Baxter
- James DuMont as Carlo Genova
- Emily D. Haley as office accountant
- Grant James as Elizabeth's father
- Juli Erikson as Carlo's mother
- Alec Rayme as Goran

== Reception ==
On review aggregator Rotten Tomatoes, the film holds an approval rating of 25% based on 12 reviews, with an average rating of 2.66/10. On Metacritic, the film has a weighted average score of 28 out of 100, based on 8 critics, indicating "generally unfavorable" reviews.

Writing for The New York Times, Daniel M. Gold described the plot as "a tangle of dithering storylines" and Levesque's acting as "inert". The However, Eric Hynes of The Village Voice was more positive, praising the film as a "meandering, eccentric, downright adorable existential crime yarn", while noting that Levesque's performance was closer to "a steroidal Steven Seagal" than "Hackman or Cagney".
