= Just Say No (play) =

1988 play written by Larry Kramer

Just Say No is a 1988 play by American writer Larry Kramer. It attacks the Ronald Reagan administration and the Mayor of New York, Ed Koch, over what Kramer saw as their hypocrisy and inertia in responding to the AIDS epidemic. It was less successful than Kramer's previous play, The Normal Heart, possibly due to its sharply political tone.

== Productions ==
In nineteen years there have only been three major productions of Just Say No - in New York at the WPA in 1988, in Chicago at the Bailiwick Theatre in 1999 and in Los Angeles at Theatre of Note in 2007.

The play ran Off-Broadway at the WPA Theatre from October 4, 1988, to November 6, 1988. Directed by David Esbjornson, the cast included Kathleen Chalfant, David Margulies, Tonya Pinkins, Joseph Ragno, Keith Reddin, Richard Riehle, Richard Topol and Julie White.

The play was part of the Bailiwick Theatre, Chicago annual festival "PRIDE". It was presented from May 21, 1999, to July 4, starring Greg Louganis and Alexandra Billings.

The play was produced by Theatre of Note, Hollywood, California in February 2007, directed by Trevor Bishop.
