= POTUS: Or, Behind Every Great Dumbass Are Seven Women Trying to Keep Him Alive =

Play by Selina Fillinger

- Original language: English
- Written by: Selina Fillinger
- Genre: Satire
- Setting: White House

Premiere
- Date: April 14, 2022
- Place: Shubert Theatre, New York City

POTUS: Or, Behind Every Great Dumbass Are Seven Women Trying to Keep Him Alive is a play by Selina Fillinger that opened on Broadway on April 27, 2022, at the Shubert Theatre. The original production was directed by Susan Stroman and starred Lilli Cooper (Chris), Lea DeLaria (Bernadette), Rachel Dratch (Stephanie), Julianne Hough (Dusty), Suzy Nakamura (Jean), Julie White (Harriet), and Vanessa Williams (Margaret). They were joined by Standbys Gisela Chípe, Jennifer Fouché, Lisa Helmi Johanson, and Awni Abdi-Bahri (as Anita Abdinezhad).

== Plot summary ==
The show centers around a PR nightmare for the White House while seven women try to keep the president out of trouble.

== Cast ==
Role	Broadway, 2022
Chris	Lilli Cooper
Bernadette	Lea DeLaria
Stephanie	Rachel Dratch
Dusty	Julianne Hough
Jean	Suzy Nakamura
Harriet	Julie White
Margaret	Vanessa Williams
Standby Jean/Bernadette/ Harriet/Margaret	Gisela Chípe
Standby Margaret/Harriet/ Bernadette/Jean	Jennifer Fouché
Standby Dusty/ Chris/Stephanie	Lisa Helmi Johanson
Standby Stephanie/ Chris/Dusty	Awni Abdi-Bahri (Anita Abdinezhad)

== Reception ==
Jesse Green, chief theatre critic for The New York Times, gave the production a mixed review, writing, "As a farce, 'POTUS' still plays by old and almost definitionally male rules; farce is built on tropes of domination and violence. On the other hand, and more happily, 'POTUS' lets us experience the double-bind of exceptional women unmediated by the men who depend on their complicity."

The Washington Post theatre critic Peter Marks compared the show favorably to that of a mix between Saturday Night Live (SNL) and Veep. He also praised its cast and in particular Susan Stroman for orchestrating the chaos on stage, writing, "Veteran director Susan Stroman is a choreographer by training. She has the mechanics of farce down pat, a knowledge base that ensures this team at all times has clockwork timing in its arsenal."

The ensemble cast received acclaim for their comedic roles. Variety critic Marilyn Stasio praised DeLaria as "priceless" and "vivid enough to be memorable". Maureen Lee Lenker of Entertainment Weekly said, "Julianne Hough is particularly mesmerizing...[she] could easily be a mere stereotype, but she surprises at every turn." Deadline Hollywood praised White's performance, calling her "one of the stage’s great comic actors" who "uses her knife-sharp bark of a voice as a sort of aural embodiment of the chaos on stage".

In the New York Post's mixed review, Johnny Oleksinski heaped praise on Dratch's performance, writing, "The genius Dratch is a riot as a nervous, introverted employee who practices power stances and can’t get a word in edgewise. Then she accidentally downs a bunch of hallucinogenic pills she thought were Tums and goes completely loco. The 'SNL' alum running wide-eyed around the theater wearing an inner-tube is the best part of the play."

=== Accolades ===
Julie White and Rachel Dratch both received nominations for a Tony Award for Best Featured Actress in a Play for their performances.

== Awards and nominations ==
=== Original Broadway production ===
Year	Award	Category	Nominee	Result
2022	Drama League Award	Outstanding Production of a Play		Nominated
2022	Drama League Award	Distinguished Performance	Rachel Dratch	Nominated
2022	Drama League Award	Distinguished Performance	Julie White	Nominated
2022	Tony Awards	Best Performance by an Actress in a Featured Role	Rachel Dratch	Nominated
2022	Tony Awards	Best Performance by an Actress in a Featured Role	Julie White	Nominated
2022	Tony Awards	Best Scenic Design of a Play		
2022	Tony Awards	Best Scenic Design of a Play	Beowulf Boritt	Nominated
