= Tonya Pinkins =

American actress

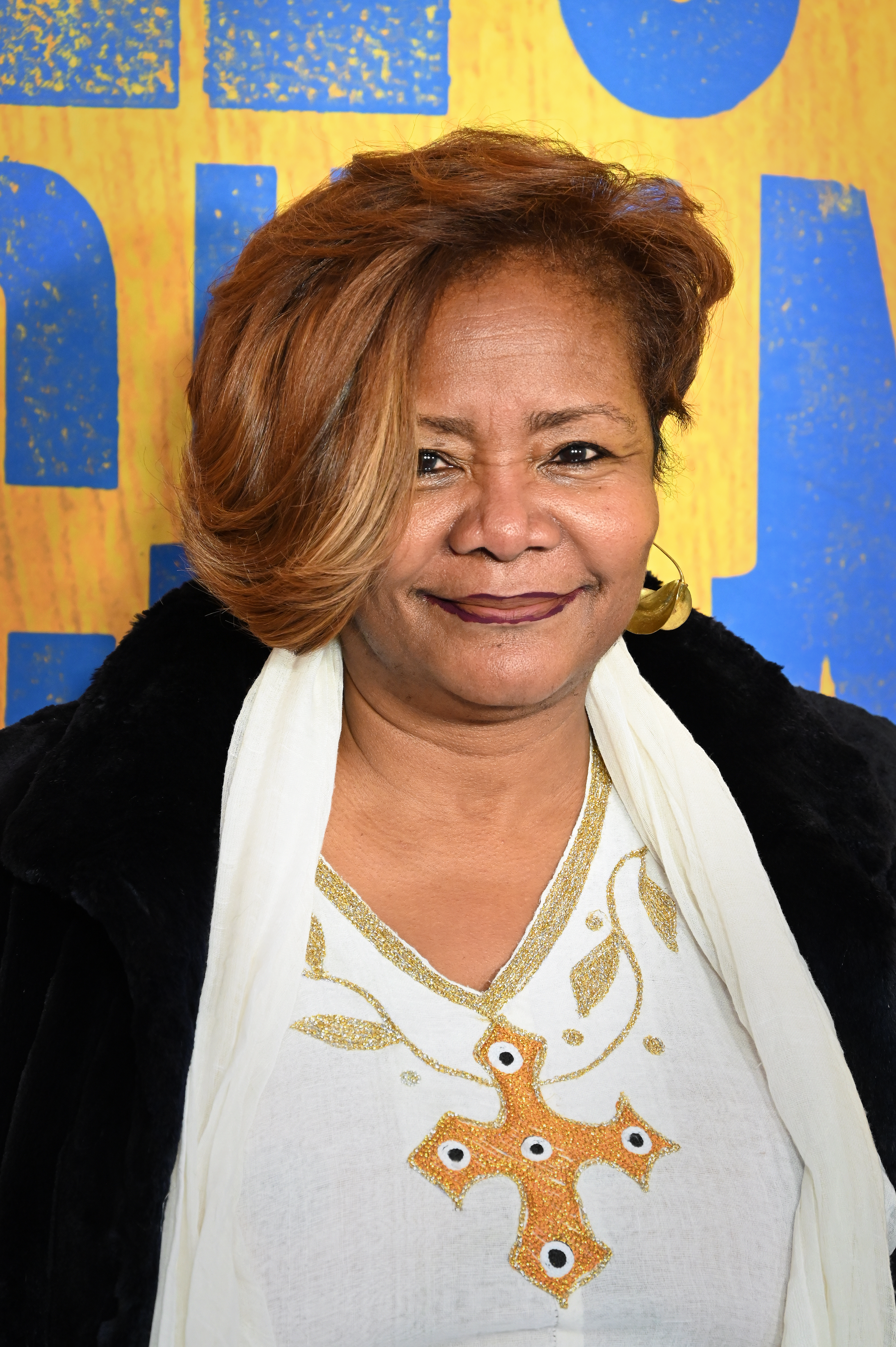
- Pinkins in 2025
- Education: Carnegie Mellon University; Columbia College Chicago (BA); California Western School of Law
- Occupations: Actress; filmmaker
- Years active: 1980–present
- Website: tonyapinkins.com

Tonya Pinkins is an American actress and filmmaker.

She is known for her portrayal of Livia Frye on the soap opera All My Children and for her roles on Broadway. She has been nominated for three Tony Awards (winning one), and has won Obie, Lortel, Drama Desk, Outer Critics Circle, AUDELCO, Garland, L.A. Drama Critics Circle, Clarence Derwent, and NAACP Theater Awards. She has been nominated for the Olivier, Helen Hayes, Noel, Joseph Jefferson, NAACP Image, Soap Opera Digest, and Ovation Awards. She won the Tony Award for Best Featured Actress in a Musical for Jelly's Last Jam. Her award-winning debut feature film Red Pill was an official selection at the 2021 Pan African Film Festival, won the Best Black Lives Matter Feature and Best First Feature at The Mykonos International Film Festival, Best First Feature at the Luléa Film Festival, and was nominated for awards in numerous festivals around the globe. Her web-series The Red Pilling of America can be heard on her podcast "You Can't Say That!"

== Early life and education ==
Pinkins attended Carnegie Mellon University, but was cast in Merrily We Roll Along and decided to pursue her career, instead.

Pinkins later returned to college, earning an undergraduate degree from Columbia College Chicago.

== Career ==
Pinkins won a Tony Award for her performance as Sweet Anita in Jelly's Last Jam. She was nominated for her roles in Play On! and in Caroline, or Change, where she played the title role. Her additional Broadway credits include Merrily We Roll Along, Chronicle of a Death Foretold, The Wild Party, House of Flowers, Radio Golf, A Time To Kill, and Holler If Ya Hear Me.

Pinkins has performed in several off-Broadway productions, including the comic role of Mopsa, the Shepherdess, in The Winter's Tale produced by the Riverside Shakespeare Company at The Shakespeare Center in 1983.

In 2011, Pinkins starred in the world premiere of Kirsten Greenidge's Milk Like Sugar at La Jolla Playhouse, and received a 2012 Craig Noel nomination for Best featured Actress in a Play. She reprised her role in the Playwrights Horizons in the Peter Jay Sharp Theater.

In 2012, Pinkins starred in Katori Hall's play Hurt Village, the gritty drama about life and change in a Memphis housing project made its world-premiere at Off-Broadway's Signature Theatre Company as part of the theatre's inaugural season.

In 2014, she appeared in New Federal Theatre's revival of Ed Bullins' The Fabulous Miss Marie opposite Roscoe Orman; in the Broadway production of Holler If Ya Hear Me; and the world premiere of Branden Jacobs-Jenkins' War at Yale Repertory. She also made guest appearances on such television shows as Army Wives, 24, Law & Order, The Cosby Show, Cold Case, Criminal Minds, and The Guardian among others.

During the mid-1980s Pinkins created the character of "Heather Dalton" on the CBS soap As the World Turns. In 1991, she was cast as Livia Frye in All My Children. Pinkins left All My Children in 1995 but returned to her role in 2003. She was later put on contract with the show from March 2004 until June 2006, when she was downgraded to recurring status.

She played Amala Motobo on 24. Pinkins played Ethel Peabody on the television show Gotham. In 2016, she played Mimi Corcoran on the Hulu science fiction limited series 11.22.63, based on the Stephen King book of the same name, and starring James Franco and Sarah Gadon. On March 16, 2017, she portrayed Sandra in the ABC television series Scandal.

Pinkins has appeared in several films in supporting roles, including Newlyweeds, Home, Fading Gigolo opposite Woody Allen, Enchanted, Premium, Romance & Cigarettes, Noah's Arc: Jumping The Broom and Above the Rim among others.

Pinkins wrote, directed, and starred as Cassandra in Red Pill, to be released in 2020.

== Filmography ==
=== Film ===
Year	Title	Role	Notes
1980	Growing Up Young	Carol	Short
1984	Beat Street	Angela	
1986	Hotshot	-	
1989	See No Evil, Hear No Evil	Leslie	
1994	Above the Rim	Mailika Watson	
2000	Redemption	Dr. Jones	Short
2002	Love Hurts	Auntie V	
2004	Love, Mom	Mom	Short
2005	Romance & Cigarettes	Female Medic	
2006	Premium	Marva	
2006	True Grits	Woman #1	Short
2007	Kuriocity	Ruby Riggs	
2007	Enchanted	Phoebe Banks	
2008	Noah's Arc: Jumping the Broom	Mrs. Robinson	
2013	Newlyweeds	Patrice	
2013	Fading Gigolo	Othella	
2013	Home	Esmin	
2015	Ori Inu: In Search of Self	Mama Lola	Short
2016	Collective: Unconscious	Ripa	
2016	Fearless Love	Det. Cambridge	Short
2017	Aardvark	Abigail	
2017	The Book of Henry	Principal Wilder	
2017	My Days of Mercy	Agatha	
2017	An Act of Terror	Mary Church Terrell	Short
2018	Write When You Get Work	Roberta Simmons	
2018	Paris Blues in Harlem	Shirley	Short
2018	Mr. Talented	Valerie Brown	Short
2019	The Artist's Wife	Liza Caldwell	
2020	The Surrogate	Karen Weatherston-Harris	
2020	Red Pill	Cassandra	Also writer and director

=== Television ===
Year	Title	Role	Notes
1981	American Dream	-	Episode: "American Dream"
1984–86	As the World Turns	Heather Dalton	Regular cast
1986	Rage of Angels: The Story Continues	Sharon	TV movie
1987	Crime Story	Junkie Prostitute	Episode: "Justice Hits the Skids"
1990	The Cosby Show	Iris	Episode: "Elvin Pays for Dinner"
1990	Guiding Light	Alanon Woman 2	Episode #1.11039
1990	Law & Order	Woman	Episode: "Subterranean Homeboy Blues"
1991–94	All My Children	Livia Frye	Regular cast
1993	Strapped	A.T.F. Officer	TV movie
1994	Against Their Will: Women in Prison	Sondra	TV movie
1995	University Hospital	Nurse Mary Jenkins	Main cast
2000	Great Performances	-	Episode: "Play On!"
2002	The Guardian	Melinda Tralins	Episode: "In Loco Parentis"
2004–09	All My Children	Livia Frye	Regular cast
2005	Sleeper Cell	Anita Al-Sayeed	Episode: "Family"
2006	Criminal Minds	Det. Nora Bennett	Episode: "A Real Rain"
2006	Cold Case	Dina Miller	Episode: "The River"
2006	Law & Order	Angela Young	Episode: "Hindsight"
2007	Unfabulous	Ms. Best	Episode: "The Toot"
2008	The Closer	Donna Taft	Episode: "Split Ends"
2009	24	Alama Matobo	Recurring cast: season 7
2009	Army Wives	Viola Crawford	Recurring cast: season 3
2013	Hostages	Beth Nix	Episode: "2:45 PM"
2015	Nurse Jackie	Charlane	Episode: "Deal" & "Nice Ladies"
2015	For Justice	Marian Horn	TV movie
2015–16	Gotham	Ethel Peabody	Recurring cast: season 2, guest: season 3
2016	11.22.63	Mia Mimi Corcoran	Recurring cast
2016–19	Madam Secretary	Susan Thompson	Recurring cast: season 3-6
2017	Scandal	Sandra	Episode: "Extinction" & "A Traitor Among Us"
2017	The Strain	Francis	Episode: "Belly of the Beast"
2018	Random Acts of Flyness	Ripa The Reaper	Recurring cast
2018	Elementary	Judge Marilyn Whitfield	Episode: "Fit to Be Tied"
2018	Fear the Walking Dead	Martha	Recurring cast: season 4
2019	NCIS: New Orleans	Julie	Episode: "Reckoning"
2019	Bull	Judge Maynard	Episode: "When the Rains Came"
2019	Wu-Tang: An American Saga	Burgess	Episode: "Impossible"
2020	Katy Keene	Busker	Episode: "Pilot"
2020	God Friended Me	Marsha	Recurring cast: season 2
2020	Black Lady Goddess	Professor Davis	TV movie
2021	Better Than My Last	Mrs. Carter	TV movie
2021–23	Run the World	Gwen Greene	2 episodes
2022	Women of the Movement	Alma Carthan	Main cast
2022	East New York	Shirley Haywood	Episode: "Snapped"
2024–present	Sistas	Marie Willis	Main cast
2025	Goosebumps	Patti	Episode: "Stay Out of the Basement, Part II"

=== Podcasts ===
Year	Title	Role	Notes
2018	Adventures in New America	Sam	Episode: "Love in the First Degree"
2019	The Two Princes	Upendo	Recurring cast

== Stage ==
Year	Title	Role(s)	Venue(s)	Notes	Ref
1981	Merrily We Roll Along	Gwen Wilson	Alvin Theater, Broadway	Broadway debut	
1988	Just Say No	Eustacia Vye	WPA Theater, Off-Broadway		
1991	Approximating Mother	Ellie, Sylvia and Grace	Judith Anderson Theater, Off-Broadway		
1992	Jelly's Last Jam	Anita	Virginia Theater, Broadway	Tony Award; Drama Desk Award	
1994	The Merry Wives of Windsor	Mistress Ford	Delacorte Theater, Off-Broadway		
1995	Chronicle of a Death Foretold	Clotilde	Plymouth Theater, Broadway		
1997	Play On!	Lady Liv	Brooks Atkinson Theater, Broadway	Tony Award nomination	
1998	Play On!	Lady Liv	Goodman Theatre, Chicago; Seattle Repertory Theatre		
2000	The Wild Party	Kate	Virginia Theater, Broadway		
2000	The Vagina Monologues	Performer	Westside Theater, Off-Broadway		
2000	Thoroughly Modern Millie	Muzzy	La Jolla Playhouse	World premiere	
2003	House of Flowers	Madame Fleur	New York City Center		
2003	Caroline, or Change	Caroline Thibodeaux	The Public Theater, Off-Broadway		
2004	Caroline, or Change	Caroline Thibodeaux	Eugene O'Neill Theatre, Broadway	Tony Award nomination Drama Desk Award nomination	
2006	Caroline, or Change	Caroline Thibodeaux	Royal National Theatre, London	Olivier Award nomination	
2007	Radio Golf	Mame Wilkins	McCarter Theatre Center, Princeton; Cort Theater, Broadway		
2008	And Her Hair Went With Her	Jasmine	The Fountain Theatre, Los Angeles		
2009	Black Pearl Sings!	Alberta 'Pearl' Johnson	Ford's Theatre, Washington, D.C.		
2011	All's Well That Ends Well	Countess of Rousillon	Delacorte Theater, Off-Broadway		
2011	Measure for Measure	Mistress Overdone	Delacorte Theater, Off-Broadway		
2011	Milk Like Sugar	Myrna	La Jolla Playhouse; Playwrights Horizons, Off-Broadway		
2012	Hurt Village	Big Mama	Signature Theatre Company, Off-Broadway		
2012	Storefront Church	Jessie Cortez	Atlantic Theater Company, Off-Broadway		
2013	A Time to Kill	Gwen Lee	John Golden Theatre, Broadway		
2014	Holler If Ya Hear Me	Mrs. Weston	Palace Theater, Broadway		
2014	The Fabulous Miss Marie	Miss Marie	Castillo Theater, Off-Broadway		
2014	War	Roberta	Yale Repertory Theatre, New Haven		
2015	Rasheeda Speaking	Jaclyn	Signature Theatre Company, Off-Broadway	Drama Desk Award nomination	
2015	Mother Courage and Her Children	Mother Courage	Classic Stage Company, Off-Broadway		
2017	Time Alone	Anna Jackson	Los Angeles Theatre Center		
2022	A Raisin in the Sun	Lena	The Public Theater, Off-Broadway		
2026	The Wild Party	Dolores Montoya	New York City Center Encores, Off-Broadway		
2026	La Cage Aux Folles	Jacqueline	New York City Center Encores, Off-Broadway		
