= Cady Huffman =

American actress (born 1965)

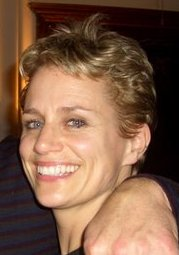
- Huffman in 2007
- Born: Santa Barbara, California, U.S.
- Occupation: Actress
- Years active: 1985–present

Cady Huffman (born February 2, 1965) is an American actress.

== Early life ==
Huffman was born in Santa Barbara, California.

== Career ==
Huffman first came to Broadway as a replacement cast member in the hit musical La Cage aux Folles (1985), and was quickly cast in Bob Fosse's Big Deal, to be followed by a Tony-Award nomination for her performance in The Will Rogers Follies (1991). In 2001, she played the role of Ulla in the original cast of the Broadway musical The Producers, by Mel Brooks. Huffman received the Tony Award for Best Featured Actress in a Musical for the role.

She made her film debut in the film Hero (1992). She has since appeared in Space Marines (1996), Romance & Cigarettes and The Nanny Diaries. She also appeared in the 2010 film The Company Men. During 2003 and 2004, she produced, starred in and acted as production designer for the independent film Sunday on the Rocks directed by Joe Morton.

On television, she has had guest starring roles on programs such as Frasier, Law & Order: Criminal Intent and Mad About You. She appeared as herself in several guest spots on the television series Curb Your Enthusiasm during 2004. The series' fourth season plot involved Larry David joining the cast of The Producers. During 2011 and 2014, she has appeared in episodes of The Good Wife

On Daytime, she took over the role of Dr. Paige Miller from Kimberlin Brown on One Life to Live in August, 2005 until she was replaced by Alexandra Neil in early 2006. She went on to play Calista Lockhart on Days of Our Lives in 2021.

She was a regular food judge on Food Network's Iron Chef America, described by host Alton Brown as "the Kitty Carlisle" of the series.

During July and August 2007, Huffman starred in the Off-Broadway play Surface to Air written by David Epstein and directed by James Naughton, in a rare dramatic part for the actress who usually appears on stage in musicals. In May 2009, she appeared in the new musical Pirates! in the Huntington Theatre Company, Boston, production. She appeared alongside The Producers co-star Nathan Lane in The Nance which opened on Broadway on April 15, 2013. She was nominated for a 2013 Outer Critics Circle Award for her work in that play. In 2014, she played a major role in the Off-Broadway rock musical Revolution in the Elbow of Ragnar Agnarsson Furniture Painter.

In July 2017 she directed City of Light, a musical by Gabrielle Wagner, Julie Weiner and Jan Roper at the SheNYC Summer Theater Festival.

In June 2023 she directed Anything Goes, a musical by Cole Porter, Guy Bolton and P.G. Wodehouse at Black Rock Theater in Fairfield, CT.

== Personal life ==
She lives in Brooklyn, New York City.

== Acting credits ==
=== Film ===
Year	Title	Role	Notes
1992	Hero	Leslie Sugar, Flight Attendant	
1997	Space Marines	Dar Mullins	
2004	Sunday on the Rocks	Gayle	
2004	Billy's Dad Is a Fudge-Packer!	Billy's Mother	Short film
2005	Romance & Cigarettes	Female Dancer & Singer	
2006	Twenty Dollar Drinks	Betty	Short film
2007	Itty Bitty Titty Committee	Lola	
2007	The Nanny Diaries	Divorcing Mom	
2009	Dare	Dr. Kolton	
2010	The Company Men	Joanna	
2010	Choose	Alice	
2012	Young(ish)	Middle-Aged Woman	Short film, completed
2013	Molly's Theory of Relativity	Natasha	
2015	Love The Coopers	Gift Shop Clerk	
2021	The Sixth Reel	Marilyn Dwaskin	
2025	Everything's Going to Be Great	Principal Franklin	

=== Television ===
Year	Title	Role	Notes
1994	The George Carlin Show		Episode: "George Goes Too Far"
1995	Pig Sty	Rita	Episode: "Leap Into an Open Grave"
1995	Mad About You	Barking Woman	Episode: "Up in Smoke"
1996	Vows of Deception	Mary Jo	TV movie
1997	Columbo	The Receptionist	Episode: "A Trace of Murder"
2003	Law & Order: Criminal Intent	Pamela Winters	Episode: "Cuba Libre"
2004	Curb Your Enthusiasm	Cady Huffman	4 episodes
2004	Frasier	Amber Licious	Episode: "Detour"
2005	Law & Order: Trial by Jury	Penny Sterba	Episode: "The Abominable Showman"
2005–2006	One Life to Live	Dr. Paige Miller	TV series
2010	Submissions Only	Andrea Dodson	Episode: "Old Lace"
2011–2014	The Good Wife	Marina Vassel	5 episodes
2012	Law & Order: Special Victims Unit	Maureen Manning	Episode: "Home Invasions"
2015	Master of None	Christina	Episode: "Parents"
2016–2017	Blue Bloods	Sheila Gormley	Episodes: "Mob Rules" & "Not Fade Away"
2017	Difficult People	Lucy	Episode: "Criminal Minds"
2017	Madam Secretary	Jeri Whittaker	Episode: "Good Bones"
2018–2024	After Forever	Lisa	4 episodes
2019	Younger	Maureen	Episode: "Merger, She Wrote"
2021	Days of Our Lives	Calista Lockhart	TV series
2025–2026	Palm Royale	Beullah	2 episodes

=== Theater ===
Year	Title	Role	Notes
1985	La Cage aux Folles	Angelique	Replacement
1986	Big Deal	Dancer	Understudy: Pearl
1991	The Will Rogers Follies	Ziegfeld's Favorite	1991 nominee: Tony Award for Best Featured Actress in a Musical
1997	Steel Pier	Rita Racine / Shelby Stevens	
1999	Dame Edna: The Royal Tour	The Gorgeous Ednaette #1	Replacement
2001–2003	The Producers	Ulla	2001 winner: Tony Award for Best Featured Actress in a Musical
2006	Plain and Fancy	Ruth Winters	Musicals in Mufti, York Theatre Company
2013	The Nance	Sylvie	
2018	Chicago	Matron "Mama" Morton	Replacement
2023	Dirty Blonde	Jo, Mae	CV Rep
