= Sunday on the Rocks =

- Directed by: Joe Morton
- Written by: Theresa Rebeck
- Starring: Suzzanne Douglas; Cady Huffman; Amiee Turner; Julie White; Ryan Heide
- Cinematography: Henry Adebonojo
- Edited by: Jeffrey Blair
- Release date: 11 March 2004
- Running time: 75 minutes
- Country: United States
- Language: English

Sunday on the Rocks is a 2004 independent film directed by Joe Morton and starring Suzzanne Douglas, Cady Huffman, Amiee Turner, Julie White, and Ryan Heide. The story was written by Theresa Rebeck for stage, then adapted by her for film.

== Premise ==
Four women, sharing a house together, spend a Sunday drinking scotch and discussing their past.

== Cast ==
- Suzzanne Douglas as Jessica
- Cady Huffman as Gayle
- Amiee Turner as Jen
- Julie White as Elly
- Ryan Heide as Richardson
