= Three Tall Women =

1991 two-act play by Edward Albee

- Playbill cover from 2018 Broadway production
- Original language: English
- Written by: Edward Albee
- Characters: A woman in her 90s A woman in her 50s A woman in her 20s The Boy
- Genre: Drama

Premiere
- Date: June 14, 1991
- Place: Vienna's English Theatre; Vienna, Austria

Three Tall Women is a two-act play by Edward Albee that premiered at Vienna's English Theatre in 1991. The three unnamed women, one in her 90s, one in her 50s, and one in her 20s, are referred to in the script as A, B, and C. The character of A, the oldest woman, is based in part on Albee's mother. In the first act, B is the caretaker and C is the lawyer for A, while in the second act they become personifications of A from earlier in her life.

An off-Broadway production of Three Tall Women in 1994 won numerous awards, including the Pulitzer Prize for Drama, Albee's third Pulitzer. Critics widely considered the play a return to form for Albee, after a string of critically derided plays in the 1980s. Three Tall Women premiered on Broadway in 2018, again earning significant acclaim, including star Glenda Jackson winning the Tony Award for Best Actress.

== Characters ==
- A: A is a 92-year-old woman. She is thin, autocratic, proud, and wealthy, with "encroaching senility".
- B: B is a 52-year-old hired caretaker for A. Although she does not enjoy working for A, she learns much from her. In Act Two, she becomes the personification of A at the age of 52. She is markedly cynical about life.
- C: C is a 26-year-old lawyer, present on behalf of A's law firm, because A has neglected necessary paperwork. In Act Two, she becomes the personification of A at the age of 26. She has all of youth's common self-assurance.
- The Boy: The son of the three women, he does not play a speaking role, but is the subject of much discussion among them. A falling-out between the son and his mother(s) is the cause of much of A and B's despair.

Notable productions

Characters	Off-Broadway debut	West End debut	Broadway debut
Characters	1994	1995	2018
A	Myra Carter	Maggie Smith	Glenda Jackson
B	Marian Seldes	Frances de la Tour	Laurie Metcalf
C	Jordan Baker	Anastasia Hille	Allison Pill

== Overview ==
The protagonist, a compelling woman more than 90 years old, reflects on her life with a mixture of shame, pleasure, regret, and satisfaction. She recalls the fun of her childhood and her early marriage, when she felt an overwhelming optimism. She also bitterly recalls negative events that caused her regret: her husband’s affairs and death, and the estrangement of her gay son.

The woman’s relationship with her son is the clearest indication that Albee was working through some troubled memories of his own in Three Tall Women. Raised by conservative New England adoptive parents who disapproved of his being gay, he left home at 18, as does the son in this play. Albee admitted to The Economist that the play "was a kind of exorcism. And I didn’t end up any more fond of the woman after I finished it than when I started."

A study guide to the play noted, "Besides exorcising personal demons, Albee regained the respect of New York theater critics with the play. Many of them had despaired that the playwright, who showed such promise during the 1960s and 1970s, had dried up creatively. In fact, Three Tall Women was awarded the Pulitzer Prize for Drama in 1994, as well as the Drama Critics Circle, Lucille Lortel, and Outer Critics Circle awards for best play."

== Plot summary ==
=== Act I ===
The play opens with the three major characters together in A's bedroom. Throughout the scene, A does most of the talking, frequently reminiscing and telling stories about her life. B humors her, while helping her do everyday things that have become difficult to do alone (sitting down, going to the bathroom, getting into bed). C, while getting a rare word in edgewise about the duties she is there to accomplish, is most often deterred by A's slipping into long-winded storytelling. C often challenges A's contradictory and nonsensical statements, but she is discouraged by B, who is clearly used to A and her habits. Act 1 ends when A, in the middle of one of her stories, has a stroke.

=== Act II ===
The play picks up with a mannequin of A lying in a bed. A, B, and C are no longer the separate entities of Act 1, but represent A at different times in her life (their ages corresponding to those of A, B, and C in Act 1). Since A, B, and C in this act are all very coherent (unlike the senile A of Act 1), the audience gets a much clearer insight into the woman's past.

At one point, the son comes in to sit by the mannequin. A and B (who are invisible to him) are not happy to see him, because of the rift between them. C (also unseen by the son) is none the wiser, because she is from a period in the woman's life before her marriage. He says nothing throughout, and leaves before the end of the play.

The play ends with A, B, and C debating about the happiest moment in their life. A has the last word, saying, "That's the happiest moment. When it's all done. When we stop. When we can stop."

== Productions ==
Three Tall Women had its world premiere at the English Theatre, Vienna, Austria, in June 1991. The play was directed by Albee, with a cast that included Myra Carter as the Old Woman, Kathleen Butler as the Middle-Aged Woman, Cynthia Bassham as the Young Woman, and Howard Nightingall as the Boy.

The play opened off-Broadway at the Vineyard Theatre on January 27, 1994, and closed on March 13, 1994. Directed by Lawrence Sacharow, the cast featured Jordan Baker (as C), Myra Carter (as A), Michael Rhodes (as the Boy), and Marian Seldes (as B). The production moved to the Promenade Theatre on April 13, 1994, where it ran to August 26, 1995. During the run, Seldes assumed the role of A, with Joan Van Ark and Frances Conroy assuming the role of B.

The play premiered in the West End at the Wyndham's Theatre in October 1994, directed by Anthony Page and featuring Maggie Smith (Elder Tall Woman), Frances de la Tour (Middle Tall Woman), Anastasia Hille (Younger Tall Woman), and John Ireland (the Boy).

In April 1995, translated as Três Mulheres Altas, the play opened at the Teatro Hebraica theater in São Paulo, Brazil, directed by José Possi Neto and starring Beatriz Segall as A, Nathalia Thimberg as B and Marisa Orth as C.

The play opened in Washington, DC, at the Kennedy Center's Eisenhower Theater on November 9, 1995. Directed by Lawrence Sacharow, the production starred Marian Seldes as A, Michael Learned as B, Christina Rouner as C, and Michael Rhodes as the Boy.

Translated as Tres mujeres altas, the play premiered in Madrid at the Teatro Lara in September 1995. It was directed by Jaime Chávarri and adapted by Vicente Molina Foix. The cast featured María Jesús Valdés (A), Magüi Mira (B), and Sílvia Marsó (C).

The play was revived in London at the Wyndhams Theatre in October 1995, with direction by Anthony Page and featuring Maggie Smith, Sara Kestelman, and Samantha Bond.

The play premiered on Broadway at the Golden Theatre on March 29, 2018, directed by Joe Mantello and starring Glenda Jackson as A, Laurie Metcalf as B, and Alison Pill as C.

A 2021 performance at the Stratford Festival in Canada starred Canadian stage icon Martha Henry as A, in her final performance before her death. A film of the production was broadcast by CBC Television in 2022, and received three Canadian Screen Award nominations at the 11th Canadian Screen Awards in 2023.

In August 2022, still translated as Três Mulheres Altas, the play once again premiered in Brazil, but this time at the Teatro Copacabana Palace located in Rio de Janeiro directed by Fernando Philbert and starring Suely Franco as A, Deborah Evelyn as B and Nathalia Dill as C. The play also premiered at the TUCA Theater later that year

== Awards and nominations ==
=== 1994 off-Broadway production ===
Year	Award	Category	Nominee	Result
1994	Drama Desk Award	Outstanding Actress in a Play	Myra Carter	Won
1994	Drama Critics Circle Award	Best Play		Won
1994	Lucille Lortel Award	Outstanding Play		Won
1994	Lucille Lortel Award	Best Actress	Myra Carter	Won
1994	Outer Critics Circle Award	Best off-Broadway Play		Won
1994	Outer Critics Circle Award	Best Actress	Myra Carter	Won
1994	Pulitzer Prize for Drama			Won
1994	Obie Award	Distinguished Performance by an Actor	Myra Carter	Won

=== 1994 West End production ===
Year	Award	Category	Nominee	Result
1994	Evening Standard Award	Best Play		Won
1994	Evening Standard Award	Best Actress	Maggie Smith	Won

=== 2018 Broadway production ===
Year	Award	Category	Nominee	Result
2018	Tony Award	Best Revival of a Play		Nominated
2018	Tony Award	Best Actress in a Play	Glenda Jackson	Won
2018	Tony Award	Best Featured Actress in a Play	Laurie Metcalf	Won
2018	Tony Award	Best Scenic Design of a Play	Miriam Buether	Nominated
2018	Tony Award	Best Costume Design of a Play	Ann Roth	Nominated
2018	Tony Award	Best Direction of a Play	Joe Mantello	Nominated
2018	Drama League Award	Outstanding Revival of a Broadway or off-Broadway Play		Nominated
2018	Drama League Award	Distinguished Performance Award	Glenda Jackson	Won
2018	Drama League Award	Distinguished Performance Award	Laurie Metcalf	Nominated
2018	Outer Critics Circle Award	Outstanding Revival of a Play (Broadway or Off-Broadway)		Nominated
2018	Outer Critics Circle Award	Outstanding Director of a Play	Joe Mantello	Nominated
2018	Outer Critics Circle Award	Outstanding Set Design (Play or Musical)	Miriam Buether	Nominated
2018	Outer Critics Circle Award	Outstanding Actress in a Play	Glenda Jackson	Won
2018	Outer Critics Circle Award	Outstanding Featured Actress in a Play	Laurie Metcalf	Won
2018	Drama Desk Award	Outstanding Revival of a Play		Nominated
2018	Drama Desk Award	Outstanding Actress in a Play	Glenda Jackson	Won
2018	Drama Desk Award	Outstanding Actress in a Play	Laurie Metcalf	Nominated
2018	Drama Desk Award	Outstanding Director of a Play	Joe Mantello	Nominated
2018	Drama Desk Award	Outstanding Set Design of a Play	Miriam Buether	Won
2018	Drama Desk Award	Outstanding Costume Design of a Play	Ann Roth	Nominated
2018	Drama Desk Award	Outstanding Lighting Design of a Play	Paul Gallo	Nominated
