= Audrey Wood (literary agent) =

American literary agent (1905–1985)

- Born: Audrey Violet Wood; February 28, 1905; New York City, U.S.
- Died: December 27, 1985 (aged 80)
- Occupation: Literary agent
- Organization(s): Liebling-Wood, Inc.
- Spouse: William Liebling

Audrey Violet Wood (February 28, 1905 – December 27, 1985) was an American literary and theatrical agent. Wood was influential in the careers of several of the most recognized dramatic playwrights of the mid-20th century, including Tennessee Williams, Carson McCullers, Robert Anderson, Mary Chase, William Inge, and Arthur Kopit.

== Career ==
Wood's agency, Liebling-Wood, Inc. opened its doors at 30 Rockefeller Plaza on April 23, 1937, in partnership with her husband, William Liebling. Wood's clients were chiefly playwrights, while Liebling was known for his list of actors; both partners established strong reputations for representing artists in their respective fields who rose to prominence on the stage and screen.

=== Tennessee Williams ===
One of Wood's early clients was Tennessee Williams who produced many of his most well-regarded stage plays while represented by Wood. In 1939, Wood helped Williams obtain a $1,000 grant from the Rockefeller Foundation (about $25,000 in 2025), in recognition of his play Battle of Angels (1940). Based on their correspondence, scholar Albert J. Devlin has characterized Wood as Williams' "primary and most trusted reader for at least the first two decades of their association."

Williams apparently blamed Wood for discouraging or censoring him in some cases, for instance in the early drafts of Camino Real (1953), but scholars seem to agree the realities were more nuanced than one might conclude relying on only the representations in Williams' part of the correspondence or on Wood's responses.

=== Works promoted by Wood ===
A partial listing of plays, movies and other properties Wood was associated with:

Year	Title	Author
1944	The Glass Menagerie	Tennessee Williams
1947	A Streetcar Named Desire	Tennessee Williams
1948	Summer and Smoke	Tennessee Williams
1953	Picnic	William Inge
1953	Tea and Sympathy	Robert Anderson
1949	Come Back, Little Sheba	William Inge
1967	Indians	Arthur Kopit
1977	A Texas Trilogy	Preston Jones

== Death ==
Wood suffered a stroke on April 30, 1981, outside the Royalton Hotel in Manhattan, where she had lived since the 1930s. She remained in a coma until her death on December 27, 1985.

== Legacy ==
The Audrey Wood Scholarship was established in 1983 by friends of Wood, and is awarded to students in the Playwriting department of Yale University. In 1984, a 199-seat section of the Jack Lawrence Theater was renamed the Audrey Wood Theater in her honor. Management had apparently wanted to name the space for Tennessee Williams, an attempt that was disputed by the Williams estate. Jack Lawrence sold the entire theater to a developer in 1987, after struggling to compete with other Off-Broadway venues.

In 1990 Max Wilk released Mr. Williams and Miss Wood: A Two Character Play, as a tribute to the thirty-year relationship between the playwright and his agent. The two-act play was adapted from Represented by Audrey Wood, a memoir which Wilk co-wrote with Wood. Wilk's play has been staged several times over the years, most recently by the Ashland Contemporary Theatre of Ashland, Oregon, in 2014.

Audrey Wood's papers are held at the Harry Ransom Center of the University of Texas at Austin, along with the papers of Tennessee Williams. Wood's collection includes playbills, scripts, musical scores, photographs, correspondence and the business records of the Liebling-Wood Agency.

== See also ==
- List of people from New York City
- Off-Broadway
- Eulalie Spence
- Theater of the United States
