= Sylvia (play) =

Play by A.R. Gurney

- Broadway Playbill (2015)

Sylvia is a play by A. R. Gurney. It premiered in 1995 off-Broadway. The subject is "Sylvia", a dog, the couple who adopts her, and the resultant comedy.

== Background ==
Gurney said that the play had been rejected by many producers before the Manhattan Theatre Club produced it, because "it equated a dog with a woman, and to ask a woman to play a dog was not just misogynist, but blatantly sexist." Gurney added that he did not think that way. He noted that the play has a "timely message of the need to connect in an increasingly alien and impersonal world. 'There is a need to connect, not only to a dog but to other people through the dog.'"

In an article for the 2nd Story Theatre in Warren, Rhode Island, Eileen Warburton wrote that "'Sylvia' is a love story, of course, or at least a story about a man’s relationship with one of those magical animals people in stories so often meet just when they’re at a troubling crossroads in life, an animal that is a guide to finding the best in ourselves.... our propensity to project human characteristics and motives onto our non-human companions is dramatized by having the adopted dog played by a sexy, adoring young woman."

== Plot ==
The place is New York City, the time is the 1990s.

Middle-aged, upper-middle-class Greg finds Sylvia, a dog (played by a human), in the park and takes a liking to her. He brings her back to the empty nest he shares with Kate. When Kate gets home, she reacts very negatively to Sylvia and wants her gone. They eventually decide that Sylvia will stay for a few days before they decide whether she can stay longer, but Greg and Sylvia have already bonded. Over the next few days, Greg spends more and more time with Sylvia and less time at his job. Greg and Sylvia go on long walks; they discuss life and astronomy. Already dissatisfied with his job, Greg now has another reason to avoid work.

Tension increases between Greg and Kate, who still does not like Sylvia, nicknaming her Saliva. Eventually, Greg becomes completely obsessed with Sylvia, and Kate fears their marriage is falling apart. Kate and Sylvia are at odds with each other, each committed to seeing the other defeated. Greg meets a strange character at the dog run, who gives Greg tips on how to manage Sylvia and his predicament involving Kate. Greg has Sylvia spayed. Sylvia is angry and in pain, but she still loves him completely.

Kate's friend pays a visit and is repulsed by Greg and Sylvia. Greg, Kate, and Sylvia sing "Every Time We Say Goodbye".

Greg and Kate visit a therapist, Leslie, who is ambiguously male and female depending on her patients' state of mind. After a session with Greg, Leslie tells Kate to get a gun and shoot Sylvia: "I hope you get her right between the eyes."

Kate is asked to teach abroad, in London, and tells Greg that the English have a six-month quarantine for any dogs coming into the country. Greg is unwilling, but eventually, he succumbs and gives the news to Sylvia, that he must give her away, to a family who have a farm in Westchester County. Greg and Sylvia have a heated and tender moment. Kate and Sylvia say goodbye; but, before Greg and Sylvia leave for Westchester, Sylvia returns the annotated and slightly chewed version of "Alls Well That Ends Well" that Kate has been looking for, and Kate has a change of heart.

The last scene is directed toward the audience. Sylvia has died, and Greg and Kate still hold her memory in all fondness.

== Productions ==
Sylvia opened Off-Broadway at Stage I of the Manhattan Theatre Club on May 2, 1995, where it ran for 167 performances. Directed by John Tillinger, the cast included Sarah Jessica Parker as "Sylvia", Blythe Danner, and Charles Kimbrough. Lighting design by Ken Billington. The production received Drama Desk Award nominations for Outstanding Play, Outstanding Actress in a Play (Parker), and Outstanding Costume Design (Jane Greenwood).

The play ran at the Coronet Theatre, Los Angeles, in February 1997, starring Stephanie Zimbalist as "Sylvia", Mary Beth Piel, Derek Smith, and Charles Kimbrough.

The play was produced by the La Mirada Theatre, Los Angeles, California, in 2007 starring Cathy Rigby as "Sylvia".

The play was produced by the Berkshire Theatre Group, Stockbridge, Massachusetts, in July 2011. The reviewer called it a "comic masterpiece".

The play's first Broadway production began previews at the Cort Theatre on October 2, 2015, starring Annaleigh Ashford as "Sylvia", Matthew Broderick, Julie White and Robert Sella, directed by Daniel J. Sullivan. The production officially opened on October 27, 2015, and ran a limited engagement through January 3, 2016. Costumes were designed by Ann Roth. The Broadway production announced that it was closing three weeks early, due to poor ticket sales.

=== Roles and notable casts ===
Characters	Off-Broadway 1995	George Street Playhouse, New Jersey 2010	Broadway 2015	Lima, Peru 2023
Greg	Charles Kimbrough	Boyd Gaines	Matthew Broderick	Gustavo Mayer
Sylvia	Sarah Jessica Parker	Rachel Dratch	Annaleigh Ashford	Carolina Cano
Kate	Blythe Danner	Kathleen McNenny	Julie White	Ebelin Ortiz
Tom/Phyllis/Leslie	Derek Smith	Stephen DeRosa	Robert Sella	Sergio Paris

== Critical reception ==
Vincent Canby, in his review in The New York Times of the original 1995 production wrote "Dramatic literature is stuffed with memorable love scenes. But none is as immediately delicious and dizzy as the one that begins the redeeming affair in A. R. Gurney's new comedy, 'Sylvia,'... Here's a romantic triangle about Greg (Charles Kimbrough), Kate (Blythe Danner), and the mongrel named Sylvia (Sarah Jessica Parker) who, as Kate puts it, eats a serious hole in their 22-year marriage."

The CurtainUp reviewer of a 2010 regional production called the play "a delightful fantasy, but also a psychologically persuasive look at one man's mid-life crisis."

The USA Today reviewer of the 2015 Broadway production praised the performers, writing: "Kate, played by a wonderfully wry Julie White... Broderick is very much in his comfort zone playing the blithely goofy straight man... Ashford has the juiciest role, ... and she plays it to hilt, without letting Sylvia chew the scenery (or Kate's red heels) entirely. The actress is a riot sliding on knee pads, wagging her legs around and rushing down the aisle to suggest hot pursuit of a male canine.... directed with a winking eye and a buoyant heart."

The Newsday reviewer wrote of a "sympathy-evoking Julie White", the "utmost clueless sweetness by Mathew Broderick in his most engaged and endearing performance in a long time", and the "spectacular Annaleigh Ashford", but criticized the direction: "...increasingly annoying directorial exaggeration as Daniel Sullivan's production progresses..."

== Awards and nominations ==
=== Original off-Broadway production ===
Year	Award Ceremony	Category	Nominee	Result
1995	Drama Desk Award	Outstanding Actress in a Play	Sarah Jessica Parker	Nominated
1995	The Hewes Award	Costume Design	Jane Greenwood	Won
1995	Lucille Lortel Award	Outstanding Costume Design	Jane Greenwood	Won

=== Original Broadway production ===
Year	Award Ceremony	Category	Nominee	Result
2016	Outer Critics Circle Award	Outstanding Featured Actor in a Play	Robert Sella	Nominated
