= Theatre '62 =

American dramatic anthology TV series (1961–1962)

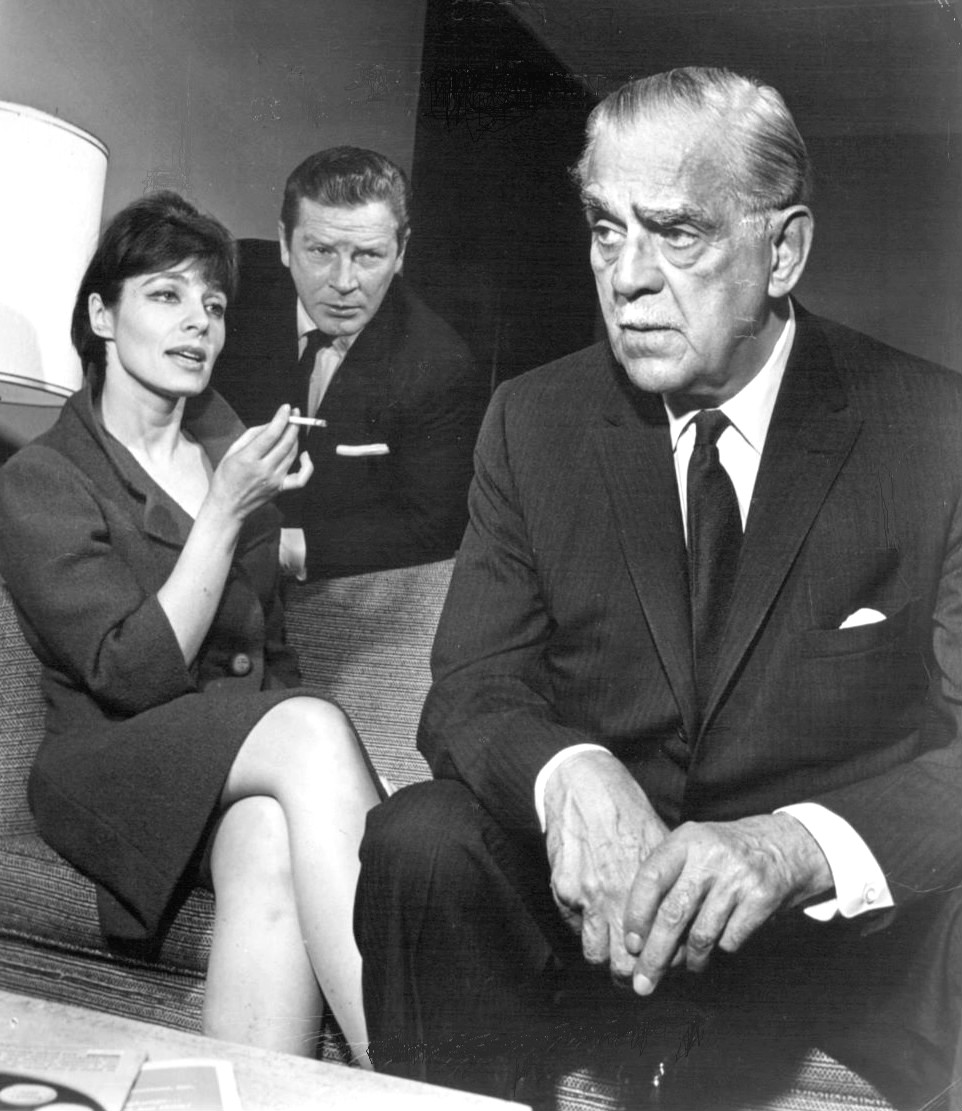
- Viveca Lindfors, Richard Basehart and Boris Karloff in "The Paradine Case" (1962)
- Country of origin: United States
- Original language: English
- No. of episodes: 7

Production
- Producer: Fred Coe

Original release
- Network: NBC
- Release: 1961 – 1962

Theatre '62 is an American dramatic anthology series produced by Fred Coe. Seven hour-long episodes aired on the National Broadcasting Company during the 1961–62 season. Its episodes were abridged adaptations of popular feature films produced by David O. Selznick.

== Production ==
Theatre '62 was announced as a series that would present eight hour-long adaptions of feature films produced by David O. Selznick. The TV plays were to be presented monthly beginning in October 1961, but the last of the announced episodes, Portrait of Jennie, was not produced.

Sumner Locke Elliott adapted "Notorious" and "Spellbound" for the series; Robert Goldman adapted "The Spiral Staircase" and "The Paradine Case". Directors included Paul Bogart, Fielder Cook and Boris Sagal.

The presentation of "Rebecca" on April 8, 1962, was NBC's last live drama in prime time until 1980, when The Oldest Living Graduate was presented.

== Episodes ==
Date	Title	Cast
October 4, 1961	"The Spiral Staircase"	Elizabeth Montgomery, Lillian Gish, Eddie Albert, Jeffrey Lynn, Edie Adams, Frank McHugh, Gig Young
November 19, 1961	"Intermezzo"	Ingrid Thulin, Jean-Pierre Aumont, Teresa Wright, George Voskovec
December 10, 1961	"Notorious"	Joseph Cotten, Barbara Rush, George Grizzard, Cathleen Nesbitt, Edward Andrews
January 14, 1962	"The Farmer's Daughter"	Lee Remick, Peter Lawford, Charles Bickford, Cornelia Otis Skinner, Jerome Cowan, Milton Selzer, Murray Hamilton
February 11, 1962	"Spellbound"	Maureen O'Hara, Hugh O'Brian, Oscar Homolka, Paul McGrath, Tim O'Connor
March 11, 1962	"The Paradine Case"	Viveca Lindfors, Richard Basehart, Boris Karloff, Robert Webber, Bramwell Fletcher, Tom Helmore
April 8, 1962	"Rebecca"	James Mason, Joan Hackett, Nina Foch, Lloyd Bochner, Murray Matheson
