= Max Wilk =

American writer (1920–2011)

Max Wilk (July 3, 1920 – February 19, 2011) was an American playwright, screenwriter and author of fiction and nonfiction books. In all, Wilk was the author of 19 books, four films, three produced plays as well as many TV shows and magazine articles.

== Biography ==
During World War II Wilk served in the First Motion Picture Unit of the United States Army Air Forces.

Formerly a resident of Ridgefield, Connecticut, he moved to Westport, Connecticut, where he lived until his death February 19, 2011, at age 90.

== Works ==
In 1968, Wilk wrote the novelization of The Beatles' cartoon Yellow Submarine. His fiction includes Don't Raise the Bridge, Lower the River; the movie version starred Jerry Lewis and shifted the locale from "Green Haven" (based on Ridgefield) to London, England. On the original bookjacket is the warning:

While the locale of this book is Connecticut, it has nothing of importance to say about Suburbia, Exurbia, the Exploding Metropolis, or the stifling wave of Middle class Conformity which, it is argued, will soon engulf the whole of Fairfield County.

In the '90s, he published a coffee table book tracing the origins of the musical Oklahoma!. Later he wrote Schmucks with Underwoods--Conversations with Hollywood's Classic Screenwriters.

For decades Wilk was a dramaturg for playwrights at The Eugene O'Neill Theater Center's National Playwright's Conference under the leadership of Lloyd Richards.

== Books ==
- The Sound of Music: The Making of Rodgers and Hammerstein's Classic Musical, Routledge (2006), ISBN 0-415-97934-X
- OK! The Story Of Oklahoma!: A Celebration of America's Most Beloved Musical, 292 pages, Applause Books; (2002) ISBN 1-55783-555-1
- Schmucks with Underwoods: Conversations with America's Classic Screenwriters,, 338 pages, Applause Books (2004), ISBN 1-55783-508-X
- The Golden Age of Television: Notes from the Survivors, 274 pages, Delacorte Press (1976) ISBN 0-440-02950-3(Paperback: Truck Press; 3rd edition, 1999, ISBN 0-916562-49-2)
- Overture and Finale: Rodgers & Hammerstein and the Creation of Their Two Greatest Hits (Oklahoma! and The Sound of Music) Paperback: 192 pages, Watson-Guptill Publications (April 1999) ISBN 0-8230-8820-0
- American Treasure Hunt: The Legacy of Israel Sack co-author, Harold Sack, 270 pages, Little Brown & Co (November 1986), ISBN 0-316-76593-7
- A Tough ACT to Follow, co-author, Jim Connor, 346 pages, Norton (January 1986) ISBN 0-393-02219-6(paperback, PaperJacks (1988) ISBN 0-7701-0736-2)
- And Did You Once See Sydney Plain?: A Random Memoir of S.J. Perelman, 83 pages, Norton (1986), ISBN 0-393-02343-5
- Get Out and Get Under, 317 pages, Norton (1981), ISBN 0-393-01425-8
- Represented by Audrey Wood: A Memoir, (co-writer with Audrey Wood) Doubleday: Garden City, NY (1981), ISBN 978-0-385-15201-3
- The Moving Picture Boys, 287 pages, Norton (1978), ISBN 0-393-08814-6
- Every Day's a Matinee: Memoirs Scribbled on a Dressing Room Door, 288 pages, Norton (1975) ISBN 0-393-07491-9
- They're Playing Our Song: The Truth Behind the Words and Music of Three Generations 295 pages, Atheneum (1973), ISBN 0-689-10554-1
- Memory lane, 1890 to 1925: Ragtime, Jazz, Foxtrot and Other Popular Music and Music Covers, 88 pages, Studioart (1973), ISBN 0-902063-13-8
- The Wit and Wisdom of Hollywood: From the Squaw Man to the Hatchet Man, (compiler) Scribner (1971) ISBN 0-689-10370-0
- The Beard, a novel, Simon and Schuster, (1965) LCCN 65-23246
- Cloud Seven,: A Comedy, 84 pages, Dramatists Play Service, (1958) ASIN: B0007E1WQK (Note: NOT an ISBN)
- Yellow Submarine novelization (1968)
- Don't Raise the Bridge, Lower the River
- "My Masterpiece", a novel, ww Norton Co., 1970, Lib Cong 77-116121

== Plays ==
According to the "Internet Broadway DataBase":

- Mr. Williams and Miss Wood: A two-character play, 42 pages, Dramatists Playservice (1990), ASIN B0006EYAJW (Note: NOT an ISBN). This tribute to Audrey Wood and Tennessee Williams received staged readings at the National Playwrights Conference of the Eugene O'Neill Theater Center and New Dramatists in 1989
- A Musical Jubilee (Musical, Revue) ran November 13, 1975 – February 1, 1976
- Cloud 7 (Comedy) ran February 14, 1958 – February 22, 1958
- Small Wonder (Musical, Revue) book by Wilk, ran September 15, 1948 – January 8, 1949
