= A Texas Trilogy =

Three plays written by Preston Jones

A Texas Trilogy (also known as The Bradleyville Trilogy) is a set of three plays written by Preston Jones. The three plays are set in a mythical West Texas town and employ idiosyncratic language and characters that present an evocative depiction of small-town Texas life. The plays in this trilogy are The Oldest Living Graduate, The Last Meeting of the Knights of the White Magnolia, and Lu Ann Hampton Laverty Oberlander.

== Performance history ==
The trilogy was first performed as separate pieces during the 1973–1974 season at Dallas Theater Center's Down Center Stage in Dallas, Texas. After this, Knights of the White and Lu Ann Hampton were performed together at the 1974 Playmarket showcase. Literary agent Audrey Wood and director Alan Schneider saw the plays and immediately became interested in bringing them to Broadway. Wood became Preston's agent and Schneider eventually directed the Trilogy in Washington, DC, and New York City.

In 1975, the three plays were performed together for the first time on the main stage of the Dallas Theater Center under the title, The Bradleyville Trilogy. That same year, the American Playwright's Theater, which promotes the production of new works in theaters around the country, chose Knights of the White as one of their offerings. In 1976, the renamed A Texas Trilogy played at the Kennedy Center in Washington, DC, to popular and critical acclaim.

After these initial successes, the trilogy opened on September 23, 1976, at the Broadhurst Theatre in New York City, where it ran until October 29, 1976, for a total of 20 performances. The cast included Henderson Forsythe, Fred Gwynne, Kristin Griffith, William LeMassena, John Marriott, Josh Mostel, Diane Ladd, Graham Beckel, and Everett McGill. Although the show received mixed reviews in New York, A Texas Trilogy won the Drama Desk Award for Outstanding Play.

The first work in the trilogy, The Oldest Living Graduate, was broadcast on television on NBC in 1980, starring Henry Fonda, George Grizzard, Timothy Hutton, Cloris Leachman, and John Lithgow and won several Emmys, including Outstanding Supporting Actor in a Miniseries or a Movie for George Grizzard.
