= Myra Carter =

American actress (1929–2016)

- Born: October 27, 1929; Chicago, Illinois, U.S.
- Died: January 9, 2016 (aged 86); Manhattan, New York, U.S.
- Occupation: Actress

Myra Carter (October 27, 1929 – January 9, 2016) was an American stage, screen and television actress.

== Career ==
Carter is most known for her work on stage and in particular the works of Edward Albee including the original casts of Three Tall Women and All Over. For her performance in Three Tall Women, Carter won numerous awards including a Drama Desk Award, an Obie Award, an Outer Critics Circle Award, and a Lucille Lortel Award. Her Broadway credits include Major Barbara, Maybe Tuesday, Georgy, and Garden District (which includes the plays Suddenly Last Summer and Something Unspoken). Her Off-Broadway credits include King John, Abingdon Square, Helen, and The Secret Concubine.

Carter won a Joe A. Callaway Award for her performance in King John Carter is also known for her performances at Memphis' Front Street Theatre.

She made an appearance in the 1999 Nicolas Cage thriller 8mm. Her television credits include Boris Karloff's Thriller, Frasier and The Nanny.

== Personal life ==
Carter was born in Chicago in 1929 to an English father and a Scottish mother, who soon separated. She was raised in Scotland. She was married to Don Garson, a writer.

== Death ==
Carter died of pneumonia on January 9, 2016, in Manhattan, aged 86.
