= Julie White =

American actress (born 1961)

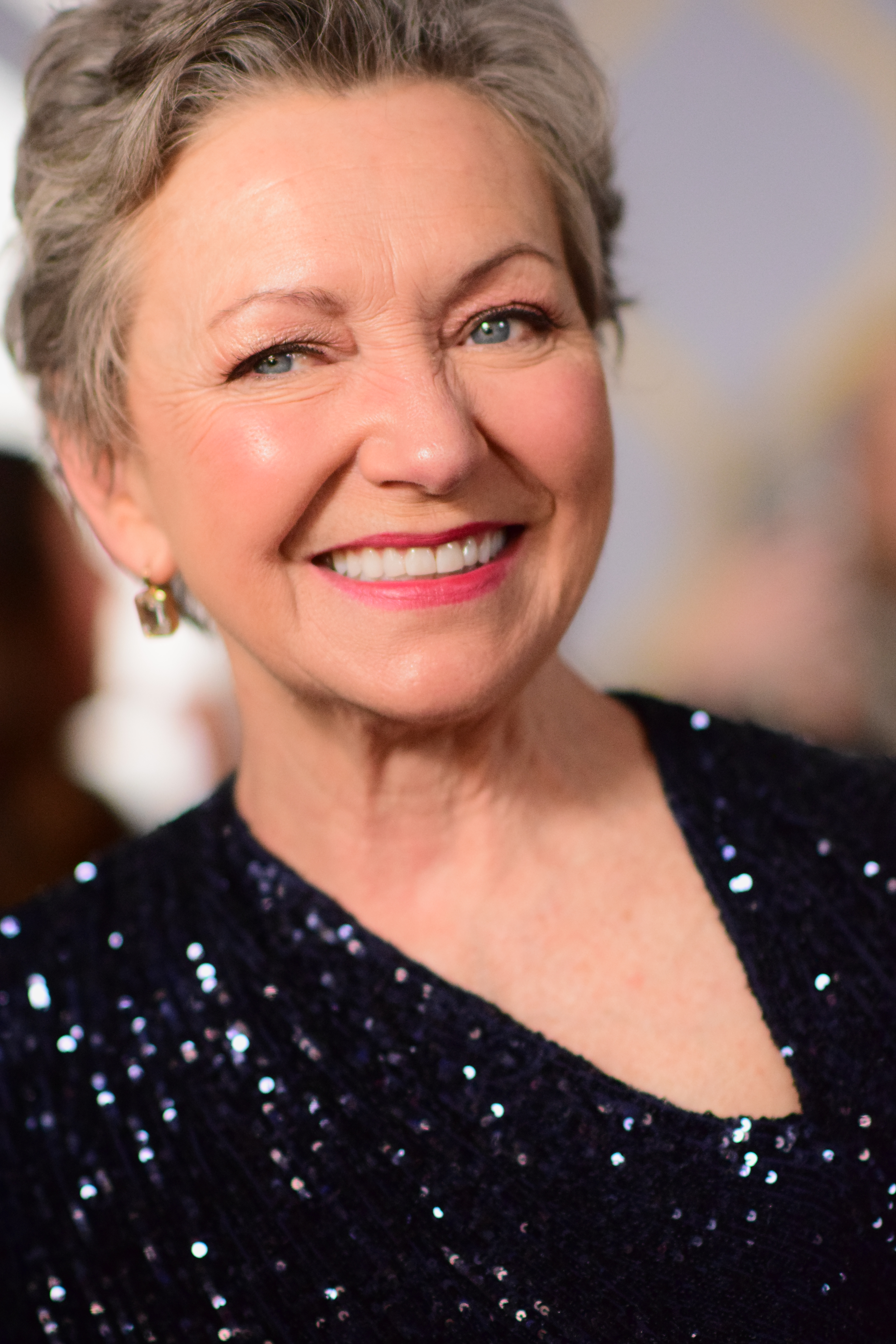
- White at the 2022 Tony Awards
- Born: Julie K. White; June 4, 1961 (age 65); San Diego, California, U.S.
- Education: Texas State University; Fordham University
- Occupation: Actress
- Years active: 1985–present
- Spouse: Carl Pandel (m. 1984; div. 1990)
- Children: 1

Julie K. White (born June 4, 1961) is an American actress. She won the Tony Award for Best Actress in a Play for her performance in The Little Dog Laughed in 2007. She has also received three other Tony Award nominations for her performances in Airline Highway in 2013, Gary: A Sequel to Titus Andronicus in 2019 and POTUS: Or, Behind Every Great Dumbass Are Seven Women Trying to Keep Him Alive in 2022. She played Sam Witwicky's mother Judy in the first three films of the Transformers film series (2007–2011).

She is also known for her television roles, including Nadine Swoboda in Chuck Lorre created ABC sitcom Grace Under Fire (1993–1997) as well as Ms. Preecher in American Horror Story (2023–2024). Other notable appearances on television include guest roles on Six Feet Under (2001–2002), Law & Order: Special Victims Unit (2003-2007), Desperate Housewives (2006), Nurse Jackie (2014) and The Good Wife (2015). She has also appeared in such films as Michael Clayton (2007), Lincoln (2012) and A Very Murray Christmas (2015).

== Personal life ==
White was born in the Balboa Naval Hospital in San Diego, California, the daughter of Sue Jane (née Terry), a therapist, and Edwin White, a dentist. White and her family moved to Austin, Texas, to take up ranching when she was three years old. She started acting in local plays and became a semi-professional at 16. While she was playing the lead role in the musical The Baker's Wife, the show's authors encouraged her to take her talent to New York City.

After graduating from high school, she attended Southwest Texas State University (now known as Texas State University) and then attended Fordham University as an English major, although she did not graduate. White married Carl Pandel in 1984; they divorced in 1990.

== Career ==
White has been a prolific stage actress, getting her start in regional theatre. Some of her regional theater credits include On the Verge at the Huntington Theatre Company, Boston, Massachusetts, 1985–1986, Largo desolato at the Yale Repertory Theatre, New Haven, Connecticut, 1990–1991, Marvin's Room at Seattle Repertory Theatre in January 1992, Absurd Person Singular in 1993 at the Long Wharf Theatre, Money and Friends by David Williamson at the UCLA James A. Doolittle Theatre, Hollywood, California, presented by the Center Theatre Group/Ahmanson in January to March 1993.

White made her Off-Broadway debut in Lucky Stiff in 1988 at Playwrights Horizons. She appeared in Just Say No (1988) and in the Off-Broadway WPA Theatre production of Early One Evening At the Rainbow Bar and Grille (1989) by Bruce Graham. She appeared in The Stick Wife by Darrah Cloud produced by the Manhattan Theatre Club at Stage II in 1991.

She appeared in Michael John LaChiusa's Over Texas, presented as part of the Ensemble Studio Theater's Marathon in 1991.

She appeared at the Off-Broadway Second Stage production of the Theresa Rebeck play Spike Heels with Kevin Bacon and Tony Goldwyn in 1992. Frank Rich wrote: "Julie White makes a far more vivid impression. Rail-thin but with a broad face and features, this actress has an off-center style and piquant wit that make her a natural for high comedy of this or any other period." White appeared in a one-woman show, Theresa Rebeck's Bad Dates, written especially for her. The play premiered Off-Broadway at Playwrights Horizons in June 2003.

On Broadway, White appeared in Wendy Wasserstein's Pulitzer Prize-winning play, The Heidi Chronicles, as a replacement. She also appeared in the made-for-television movie of The Heidi Chronicles, which aired in 1995.

In 2006, she appeared Off-Broadway in The Little Dog Laughed by Douglas Carter Beane, playing Diane, a screen agent, who, as one critic put it, is "a Mephistopheles in Manolos". The show transferred to Broadway in October 2006 with a new cast, including former Grace Under Fire costar Tom Everett Scott. She won the Tony Award for Best Performance by a Leading Actress in a Play for her performance.

White played Nadine, the quirky neighbor on Grace Under Fire. White joined the show when it launched in 1993 and appeared in the first four seasons. However, she did not appear in the show's final season. Her departure was attributed to conflict with the show's star, Brett Butler.

White has subsequently made several guest appearances on HBO's Six Feet Under as Mitzi Dalton-Huntley and on NBC's Law & Order: Special Victims Unit as Dr. Anne Morella. White also appeared on Desperate Housewives as Amanda in the Season Two finale but chose to turn down a recurring role when she was offered the role in The Little Dog Laughed. She plays Judy Witwicky, mother of the main human character Sam Witwicky, in Transformers and its sequels, Transformers: Revenge of the Fallen and Transformers: Dark of the Moon. White appeared in the ABC sitcom Cavemen in 2007.

In 2008, White received a Drama Desk Award nomination as Outstanding Actress in a Play for her role in the play From Up Here.

In 2009, she appeared in the HBO original movie Taking Chance starring Kevin Bacon. She also lent her voice to the 2009 animated film Monsters vs. Aliens.

White has served several times as a guest judge on the reality TV series Iron Chef America. White stepped into the role of Masha, originated by Sigourney Weaver, in Christopher Durang's play Vanya and Sonia and Masha and Spike, on Broadway, from July 28 to August 25, 2013, at the Golden Theatre.

In 2013, White was a series regular on Amazon's Alpha House, a political comedy series written by Doonesbury creator Garry Trudeau. White plays Maddie Biggs, the wife of North Carolina Senator Gil John Biggs, played by John Goodman. White will also appear in the show's second season, which is filming over the summer of 2014.

In 2014 she joined the cast of the Showtime television drama Nurse Jackie for its sixth season.

She appeared on Broadway at the Samuel J. Friedman Theatre in the Manhattan Theatre Club production of the Lisa D'Amour play Airline Highway in April 2015 to June 2015. White was nominated for the 2015 Drama Desk Award, Outstanding Featured Actress in a Play and the 2015 Tony Award, Featured Actress in a Play. Later in 2015, she played Kate opposite Matthew Broderick and Annaleigh Ashford in Sylvia at the Cort Theatre.

In July 2017, White took over the role of Nora in A Doll's House, Part 2 at the John Golden Theatre on Broadway, succeeding Laurie Metcalf.

In 2018, White was cast in a recurring role in the third season of Netflix's Designated Survivor as Lorraine Zimmer.

In 2019, White joined the cast of Gary: A Sequel to Titus Andronicus at the Booth Theatre on Broadway. An unexpected injury had forced Andrea Martin, the original star, to not be able to continue the show. Kristine Nielsen took over Martin's role, and White took over Nielsen's role, with only a few extra days for rehearsal. Both women were rewarded with Tony Award nominations for Featured Actress in a Play for their performances.

In 2022, White was cast in the role of Helen Smallwood on the CBS sitcom How We Roll.

== Filmography ==
=== Film ===
Year	Title	Role	Notes
1999	Flypaper	Cindy	
2001	Say It Isn't So	Ruthie Falwell	
2002	Slap Her... She's French	Bootsie Grady	
2004	Sunday on the Rocks	Elly	
2006	The Astronaut Farmer	Beth Goode	
2007	Transformers	Judy Witwicky	
2007	The Nanny Diaries	Jane Gould	
2007	Michael Clayton	Mrs. Greer	
2009	Breaking Upwards	Joanie	
2009	Monsters vs. Aliens	Wendy Murphy (voice)	
2009	Transformers: Revenge of the Fallen	Judy Witwicky	Nominated—Razzie Award for Worst Supporting Actress
2010	Morning	Mary	
2010	The Frontiersmans Wife	Melissa	Short film
2011	Our Idiot Brother	Lorraine	
2011	Transformers: Dark of the Moon	Judy Witwicky	
2011	Inside Out	Martha	
2011	Night of the Living Carrots	Wendy Murphy (voice)	Short film
2011	Language of a Broken Heart	Mimi	
2012	Hello I Must Be Going	Gwen	
2012	Lincoln	Elizabeth Blair Lee	
2014	Life Partners	Deborah	
2014	Adult Beginners	Shirley	
2015	A Very Murray Christmas	Bev	

=== Television ===
Year	Title	Role	Notes
1992	Law & Order	Sandy	Episode: "Star Struck"
1993–1997	Grace Under Fire	Nadine Swoboda	94 episodes
1995	The Heidi Chronicles	Fran	Television movie
1999	Touched by an Angel	Molly Avery	Episode: "Til Death Do Us Part"
2000	JAG	Det. Wanda Schilling	Episode: "People v. Gunny"
2000	Strong Medicine	Caitlin Crawford	Episode: "Misconceptions"
2001	Ally McBeal	Marian	Episode: "In Search of Barry White"
2001	Nathan's Choice	Marcia	Television movie
2001–2002	Six Feet Under	Mitzi Dalton Huntley	4 episodes
2002	Thieves	Barb Lieser	Episode: "Home Is Where the Heist Is"
2003	Whoopi	Press Secretary	Episode: "The Vast Ring Wing Conspiracy"
2003–2007	Law & Order: Special Victims Unit	Dr. Anne Morella	5 episodes
2004	Rescue Me	Dr. Goldberg	Episode: "Guts"
2005–2012	Iron Chef America	Herself	13 episodes
2006	Desperate Housewives	Amanda	2 episodes
2007–2008	Cavemen	Leslie McKinney	7 episodes
2009	Taking Chance	Col. Karen Bell	Television movie
2009	Monsters vs. Aliens: Mutant Pumpkins from Outer Space	Wendy Murphy (voice)	Television special
2010	Funny in Farsi	Candace Smiley	Unsold TV pilot
2011	Law & Order: Criminal Intent	Stephanie Miller	Episode: "The Last Street in Manhattan"
2011	Damages	Congresswoman Donna Chase	Episode: "There's Only One Way to Try a Case"
2011	Smothered	Patty	Television movie
2012	The Penguins of Madagascar	Ma (voice)	Episode: "Smotherly Love/Littlefoot"
2012–2013	Go On	Anne	22 episodes
2013	The Broadway.com Show	White	Episode: "1.37"
2013–2014	Alpha House	Maddie Biggs	20 episodes
2014	Save the Date	Connie	pilot for ABC/CBS
2014	Nurse Jackie	Antoinette Mills	10 episodes
2014	Wild Card	Judge Hockett	Episode: "The Pilot"
2015	The Good Wife	Selma Krause	Episode: "Dark Money"
2016	You're the Worst	Dr. Tabitha Higgins	Episode: "Twenty-Two"
2016	Real Good People	Gloria	pilot for CBS
2016	Pearl	Joy	pilot (ABC)
2017	Man Seeking Woman	Lucy's Mom	4 episodes
2017	Chopped	Herself	Episode: "Star Power: The Last Laugh!"
2018	Chicago Med	Tessa	Episode: "Best Laid Plans"
2019	Designated Survivor	Lorraine Zimmer	Recurring role
2019	Big Mouth	Kimberly	2 episodes
2020	Mrs. America	Bar Woman	Episode: "Houston"
2021-2024	NCIS: Hawaiʻi	Maggie Shaw	Recurring role, 7 episodes
2022	How We Roll	Helen Smallwood	Main role
2022	Roar	Barbara	Episode: "The Woman Who Returned Her Husband"
2022	WeCrashed	Monica	Episode: "Masha Masha Masha"
2023	American Horror Story: Delicate	Ms. Mavis Preecher	Main Role

=== Theatre ===
Year	Title	Role	Venue
1989	The Heidi Chronicles	Debbie / Jill / Lisa (Replacement)	Plymouth Theatre, Broadway
2006	The Little Dog Laughed	Diane	Second Stage Theater, Off-Broadway; Cort Theatre, Broadway
2008	From Up Here	Grace	New York City Center, Off-Broadway
2013	Vanya and Sonia and Masha and Spike	Masha (Replacement)	John Golden Theatre, Broadway
2015	Airline Highway	Tanya	Samuel J. Friedman, Broadway
2015	Sylvia	Kate	Cort Theatre, Broadway
2017	A Doll's House, Part 2	Nora (Replacement)	John Golden Theatre, Broadway
2019	Gary: A Sequel to Titus Andronicus	Carol	Booth Theatre, Broadway
2022	POTUS: Or, Behind Every Great Dumbass Are Seven Women Trying to Keep Him Alive	Harriet	Shubert Theatre, Broadway

== Awards and nominations ==
Year	Award	Category	Work	Result
2006	Drama Desk Award	Outstanding Actress in a Play	The Little Dog Laughed	Nominated
2006	Obie Award	Distinguished Performance	The Little Dog Laughed	Won
2007	Tony Award	Best Actress in a Play	The Little Dog Laughed	Won
2008	Drama Desk Award	Outstanding Actress in a Play	From Up Here	Nominated
2008	Drama League Award	Distinguished Performance	From Up Here	Nominated
2015	Tony Award	Best Featured Actress in a Play	Airline Highway	Nominated
2015	Drama Desk Award	Outstanding Featured Actress in a Play	Airline Highway	Nominated
2015	Drama League Award	Distinguished Performance	Airline Highway	Nominated
2019	Tony Award	Best Featured Actress in a Play	Gary: A Sequel to Titus Andronicus	Nominated
2019	Drama League Award	Distinguished Performance	Gary: A Sequel to Titus Andronicus	Nominated
2022	Tony Award	Best Featured Actress in a Play	POTUS	Nominated
2022	Drama League Award	Distinguished Performance	POTUS	Nominated
