= The Oldest Living Graduate =

- Written by: Preston Jones
- Series: A Texas Trilogy
- Setting: Summer 1962 in Bradleyville, Texas. The den of Floyd Kinkaid's ranch-style home on the outskirts of town.

The Oldest Living Graduate is the third and final play in the series A Texas Trilogy by Preston Jones.

== History ==
The original name of A Texas Trilogy was The Bradleyville Trilogy. The trilogy was first performed in its entirety at the Dallas Theater Center in 1975.

== Production history ==
The Oldest Living Graduate premiered at the Down Center Stage in November 1974.

The three plays were first presented together as The Bradleyville Trilogy in 1975 at the Dallas Theater Center.

The trilogy was most successful under the direction of Alan Schneider in its premiere as A Texas Trilogy at the Kennedy Center's Eisenhower Theater in Washington, D.C., during July and August 1976.

The trilogy debuted on Broadway at the Broadhurst Theatre on September 23, 1976, again directed by Alan Schneider. It closed after 20 performances on October 29, 1976. It featured the following cast:

- Clarence Sickenger – Henderson Forsythe
- Colonel J. C. Kinkaid – Fred Gwynne
- Floyd Kinkaid – Lee Richardson
- Maureen Kinkaid – Patricia Roe
- Claudine Hampton – Avril Gentles
- Martha Ann Sickenger – Kristin Griffith
- Major Leroy W. Ketchum – William LeMassena
- Cadet Whopper Turnbull – Paul O'Keefe
- Mike Tremaine – Ralph Roberts

== Television presentation ==
The Oldest Living Graduate was performed live April 7, 1980, as the debut presentation of the NBC-TV series NBC Live Theatre. Performed at Southern Methodist University, the production featured Henry Fonda, George Grizzard, Cloris Leachman and Timothy Hutton. It was NBC's first live drama presentation in prime time in 18 years, when an adaptation of Rebecca aired April 8, 1962, on the series Theatre '62.
