= The Little Dog Laughed =

2006 comedy play by Douglas Carter Beane

- The show's poster
- Original language: English
- Written by: Douglas Carter Beane
- Characters: Mitchell; Diane; Alex; Ellen
- Subject: Homosexuality, public perception
- Genre: Comedy

Premiere
- Date: January 10, 2006
- Place: Second Stage Theatre, New York City
- Directed by: Scott Ellis

The Little Dog Laughed is a 2006 American comedy play by Douglas Carter Beane. The play initially ran at Second Stage Theater having its Broadway debut at the Cort Theatre on November 13, 2006.

The original Off-Broadway and Broadway productions received positive reviews by theatre critics, praising the cast, which featured Neal Huff, Julie White, Johnny Galecki and Zoe Lister-Jones. The Broadway production received two nominations at the 61st Tony Awards, including for Best Play and Best Performance by a Leading Actress in a Play for White, winning for the latter. For his stage debut performance Galecki was honored with the Theatre World Award.

== Synopsis ==
The four characters are an actor, Mitchell; his acerbic agent Diane; a hustler named Alex; and Alex's girlfriend Ellen. When Mitchell and Alex become involved in a physical relationship, Diane is concerned that what she describes as Mitchell's "slight recurring case of homosexuality" will derail his career before it gets started.

== Production history ==
The play originally was produced off-Broadway at the Second Stage Theater. It opened on 10 January 2006 and closed on February 26, 2006. Scott Ellis directed Neal Huff as Mitchell, Julie White as Diane, Johnny Galecki as Alex, and Zoe Lister-Jones as Ellen. Understudies were Dana Slamp and Brian Henderson. Lucille Lortel Award nominations went to Ellis and White, and the play was nominated for the GLAAD Media Award for Outstanding New York Theatre. Vijay Mathew assistant directed.

White and Galecki remained in the play when it transferred to Broadway. After 22 previews it opened on November 13, 2006 at the Cort Theatre and ran for 112 performances. Tom Everett Scott portrayed Mitchell and Ari Graynor played Ellen. Understudies Henderson and Slamp remained with the production. Lister-Jones replaced Graynor at the end of the run.

It was nominated for the Tony Award for Best Play and Julie White won the Tony Award for Best Performance by a Leading Actress in a Play for her performance. The 2007 Theatre World Award was presented to Johnny Galecki.

The title, a line from the Mother Goose nursery rhyme "Hey Diddle Diddle," is also a reference to the fictional short story written by Arturo Bandini in John Fante's Ask The Dust. The same title is also used for a fictional play that appears in Agatha Christie's Three Act Tragedy and in her short story “The Dream”.

The play opened at the Garrick Theatre in London's West End on 20 January 2010. It ran for a limited season until 10 April 2010. The production starred Rupert Friend as Michael and Tamsin Greig as Diane. Also appearing were Gemma Arterton and Harry Lloyd. The production was directed by Jamie Lloyd. The play will see its Canadian debut on January 7 in Vancouver, Canada. The show was produced by Stage One Theatre.

The show premiered in Brisbane in February 2010. Presented by The Queensland Theatre Company at The Cremorne Theatre of the Queensland Performing Arts Centre.

On February 27, 2026, it was announced that a Broadway revival was in development, with a private presentation scheduled for March 4. The presentation will star Luke Macfarlane, Cooper Koch, and Billy Porter.

== Awards and nominations ==
=== Original Broadway production ===
Year	Award	Category	Nominee	Result	Ref.
2007	GLAAD Media Awards	Outstanding New York Theater: Broadway and Off-Broadway Award	Douglas Carter Beane'	Won	
2007	Theatre World Award		Johnny Galecki	Won	
2007	Tony Award	Best Play		Nominated	
2007	Tony Award	Best Performance by a Leading Actress in a Play	Julie White	Won	
