= Lu Ann Hampton Laverty Oberlander =

- Written by: Preston Jones
- Series: A Texas Trilogy
- Setting: Bradleyville, Texas. The Hampton Home, 1953; Red Grover's Bar, 1963; The Hampton Home, 1973.

Lu Ann Hampton Laverty Oberlander is the second play in the series A Texas Trilogy by Preston Jones.

== History ==
The original name of A Texas Trilogy was The Bradleyville Trilogy. The trilogy was first performed in its entirety at the Dallas Theater Center in 1975.
