= Kristin Griffith =

American actress (born 1953)

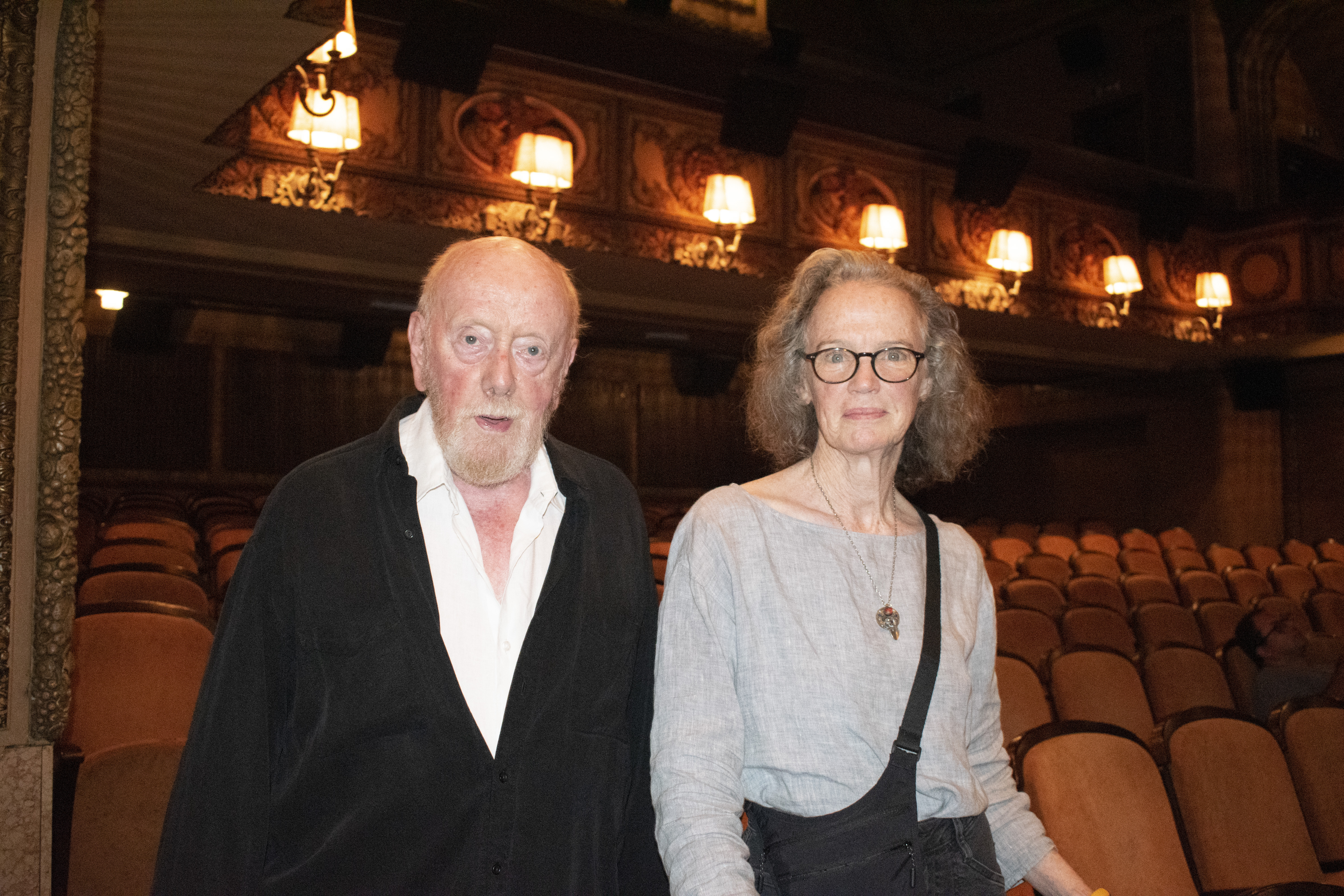
- Kristin Griffith with her husband, Peter Maloney in 2025
- Born: September 7, 1953 (age 73); Odessa, Texas, U.S.
- Education: Juilliard School
- Occupation: Actress
- Years active: 1976–present

Kristin Griffith (born September 7, 1953) is an American actress who appeared in screen and stage production. She appeared in films Interiors (1978), The Europeans (1979), King of the Hill (1993), Ben Is Back (2018) and The Devil All the Time (2020).

== Early years ==
Griffith was born in Odessa, Texas, the daughter of Mr. and Mrs. William W. Griffith. She appeared in numerous productions of the Pickwick Players in Midland, Texas, in her youth. In the fall of 1971 she began attending the Juilliard School in New York. She returned to Midland in the summer of 1972 to work as a summer assistant with the Players. She had charge of the box office, and she taught a course in progressive acting. In addition to graduating from Juilliard, she is an alumna of the Avant-Garde Opera in Graz, Austria.

== Career ==
In 1976 she starred in A Texas Trilogy: Lu Ann Hampton Laverty Oberlander and A Texas Trilogy: The Oldest Living Graduate at Broadhurst Theatre. In 1978, Griffith made her big screen debut starring alongside Geraldine Page, Mary Beth Hurt and Diane Keaton in the drama film, Interiors directed by Woody Allen. The following year she starred in the period drama film The Europeans and the made-for-television movie Flesh & Blood alongside Tom Berenger.

During the 1980s, Griffith mostly acted on off-Broadway productions and television. She has appeared in regional theaters across the country and at the Shaw Festival in Canada. In 1980 she played Ruby Donner in the soap opera, Another World and later guest-starred on CHiPs, House Calls and Kay O'Brien. In 1990s she appeared in In the Line of Duty: Manhunt in the Dakotas (1991), Gregory K, King of the Hill (both 1993), Rose Hill (1997) and The Long Way Home (1998). She later made guest-starring appearances on television series Law & Order, Law & Order: Special Victims Unit, Law & Order: Criminal Intent, Third Watch, New Amsterdam, Blue Bloods,Succession, The Deuce and The Good Fight. In 2015 she received a Drama Desk nomination for Outstanding Actress in a Play in The Fatal Weakness at the Mint Theater. She appeared in films Cold in July (2014), I Smile Back (2015), Drawing Home (2017), Ben Is Back (2018), The Devil All the Time (2020) and Things Heard & Seen (2021). She played the recurring role as Cassandra Wall in the 2022 Netflix horror series Archive 81, and co-starred in the miniseries The Girl from Plainville (2022) and Full Circle (2023). In 2025, Griffith won the Best Actress Award at the Prague Independent Film Festival for her performance in the drama film The Reckoning.

== Filmography ==
- Interiors (1978, by Woody Allen) – Flyn
- The Europeans (1979, by James Ivory) – Lizzie Acton
- Flesh & Blood (1979 TV movie) – Michelle
- CHiPs – episode "Bomb Run" (1981) – Terri
- In the Line of Duty: Manhunt in the Dakotas (1991 TV movie)
- Gregory K.: A Place to Be (1993 TV movie) – Elizabeth Russ
- King of the Hill (1993, Steven Soderbergh) – Mrs. McShane
- Law & Order – episode "Seed" (1995) – Clara Brock
- Rose Hill (1997 TV movie) – Annie
- The Long Way Home (1998 TV movie) – Bonnie Gerrin
- Tis the Season (1998 short) – Aunt Katie
- Wonderland – episode "20/20 Hindsight" (2000) – Carolina Rickle
- Calling Bobcat (2000) – Mrs. Marshall
- Law & Order: Special Victims Unit – episode "Runaway" (2001) – Mrs. Foster
- Revolution#9 (2001) – Gale
- Law & Order – episode "All My Children" (2001) – Brenda Lucas
- Ed – episode "Wheel of Justice" (2002) – Barbara Jerricho
- Law & Order: Criminal Intent – episode "Want" (2004) – Amanda Norman
- Third Watch – episode "How Do You Spell Belief?" (2005) – Stevie's Mother
- New Amsterdam – episode "Pilot" (2008) – Mrs. Carlton
- I Smile Back (2015) – Nurse Pauline
- Ben Is Back (2018) – Mrs. Crane
- Succession episodes "Pre-Nuptial" and "Nobody Is Ever Missing" (2018) – Mrs Wambsgans
- The Deuce (2019) – Phyllis Lang
- Big Dogs (2020) – Renny's Mom
- The Devil All the Time (2020) – Emma Russell
- Archive 81 (2022) – Cassandra Wall
