= Preston Jones (playwright) =

American dramatist

- Born: April 7, 1936; Albuquerque, New Mexico, U.S.
- Died: September 9, 1979 (aged 43); Dallas, Texas, U.S.
- Occupation: Playwright/Actor/Director

Preston Jones (April 7, 1936 – September 19, 1979) was an American playwright best known for A Texas Trilogy, a set of three plays.

== Early life ==
Jones was born in Albuquerque, New Mexico. His father, James B. Jones, was lieutenant governor of New Mexico.

Jones graduated from the University of New Mexico in 1960, with a degree in education. After briefly working as an educator, he began studying drama at Baylor University under Paul Baker. Due to a conflict between Baker and Baylor's administration, Baker and Jones both moved to Trinity University (Texas) in San Antonio, where Jones received a master's degree 1966.

== Career ==
Jones spent the majority of his adult life in the employment of the Dallas Theater Center (DTC), performing many different roles including actor, stage manager, and director. During his employment at DTC, he met his wife, actress, director, designer and DTC's assistant director, Mary Sue Jones, who had a major influence on his writing and career.

In 1972, Jones was given directorship of the Down Center Stage (a workshop within DTC), through which he premiered his best-known work ''The Texas Trilogy''. The first two shows from the Trilogy were included in the Playmarket 74 showcase, attended by Audrey Wood (who became Jones' agent) and Alan Schneider (who directed the Trilogy in Washington, D.C. and New York).

Following his discovery by Wood and Schneider, Jones became a subject of significant interest to the theatre community, and was compared to Tennessee Williams and Eugene O'Neill by critics. Jones continued to write, creating A Place on the Magdalena Flats, Santa Fe Sunshine, and Juneteenth before his death in 1979 from complications related to surgery on a bleeding ulcer.
