= List of awards and nominations received by Nathan Lane =

Nathan Lane awards and nominations
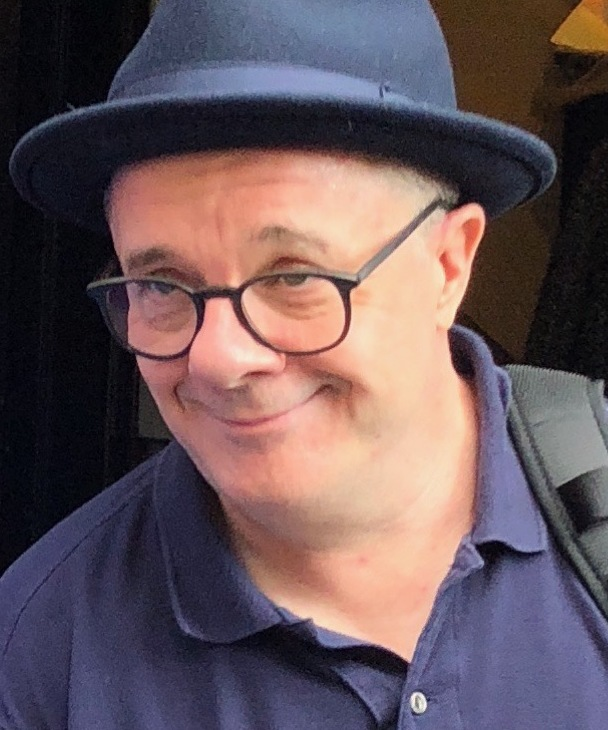
Awards and nominations
Award	Wins	Nominations
Tony Awards	3	7
Emmy Awards	3	11
Golden Globe Awards	0	2
Actor Awards	1	2
Olivier Awards	1	1

Totals (Note: Certain award groups do not simply award one winner. They acknowledge several different recipients, have runners-up, and have third place. Since this is a specific recognition and is different from losing an award, runner-up mentions are considered wins in this award tally. For simplification and to avoid errors, each award in this list has been presumed to have had a prior nomination.)
- Wins: 8
- Nominations: 24

This article is a List of awards and nominations received by Nathan Lane.

Nathan Lane is an American actor and comedian known for his roles on stage and screen. He has received several awards including three Tony Awards, seven Drama Desk Awards, which includes the Hal Prince Lifetime Achievement Award, three Emmy Awards, and an Actor Awards as well as nominations for two Golden Globe Awards.

Lane has received six Tony Award nominations receiving three wins for his performances as Pseudolus in the Stephen Sondheim musical comedy A Funny Thing Happened on the Way to the Forum (1996), Max Bialystock in the Mel Brooks satirical musical The Producers (2001), and Roy Cohn in Tony Kushner epic play Angels in America (2018). Lane has received eleven Drama Desk Award nominations receiving seven wins, which includes the Harold S. Prince Award for Lifetime Achievement, as well as two Obies, the Lucille Lortel Award and six Outer Critics Circle Awards. He also won the Laurence Olivier Award for his performance in the West End production in The Producers.

For his film work he has received two Golden Globe Award nominations for his performances in Mike Nichols' The Birdcage (1996) and the film adaptation of the Mel Brooks Broadway musical The Producers. He received the Actor Award for Outstanding Performance by a Cast in a Motion Picture for The Birdcage (1996) and the National Board of Review Award, winning for Outstanding Ensemble for Nicholas Nickleby.

Lane has also received various awards for his work on television including a Primetime Emmy Award, and a record breaking eight nominations in the guest actor category. He won the Primetime Emmy Award for Outstanding Guest Actor in a Comedy Series for playing Teddy Dimas in the Hulu mystery-comedy series Only Murders in the Building in 2022. He was Emmy-nominated for playing a thief in Frasier (1995), a former lover in Mad About You (1998), and Pepper Saltzman in Modern Family (2011-2014). He also received two Daytime Emmy Awards for voicing Timon in Timon & Pumbaa (1996) and Spot Helperman / Scott Leadready II in Teacher's Pet (2001).

== Major associations ==
=== Actor Awards ===
Year	Category	Nominated work	Result	Ref.
1997	Outstanding Cast in a Motion Picture	The Birdcage	Won	
1997	Outstanding Actor in a Supporting Role	The Birdcage	Nominated	
2024	Outstanding Ensemble in a Drama Series	The Gilded Age	Nominated	

=== Emmy Awards ===
Year	Category	Nominated work	Result	Ref.
Primetime Emmy Awards
1995	Outstanding Guest Actor in a Comedy Series	Frasier (episode: "Fool Me Once, Shame On You. Fool Me Twice..")	Nominated	
1998	Outstanding Guest Actor in a Comedy Series	Mad About You (episode: "Good Old Reliable Nathan")	Nominated	
2011	Outstanding Guest Actor in a Comedy Series	Modern Family (Season 2)	Nominated	
2013	Outstanding Guest Actor in a Drama Series	The Good Wife (Season 4)	Nominated	
2013	Outstanding Guest Actor in a Comedy Series	Modern Family (episode: "A Slight at the Opera")	Nominated	
2014	Outstanding Guest Actor in a Comedy Series	Modern Family (Season 5)	Nominated	
2022	Outstanding Guest Actor in a Comedy Series	Only Murders in the Building (episode: "The Boy From 6B")	Won	
2023	Outstanding Guest Actor in a Comedy Series	Only Murders in the Building (episode: "Here's Looking at You")	Nominated	
Daytime Emmy Awards
1996	Outstanding Performer in an Animated Program	Timon & Pumbaa (Season 1)	Won	
2000	Outstanding Performer in an Animated Program	George and Martha (Season 1)	Nominated	
2001	Outstanding Performer in an Animated Program	Teacher's Pet	Won	

=== Golden Globe Award ===
Year	Category	Nominated work	Result	Ref.
1996	Best Actor – Motion Picture Musical or Comedy	The Birdcage	Nominated	
2006	Best Actor – Motion Picture Musical or Comedy	The Producers	Nominated	

=== Olivier Awards ===
Year	Category	Nominated work	Result	Ref.
2005	Best Actor in a Musical	The Producers	Won	

=== Tony Awards ===
Year	Category	Nominated work	Result	Ref.
1992	Best Actor in a Musical	Guys and Dolls	Nominated	
1996	Best Actor in a Musical	A Funny Thing Happened on the Way to the Forum	Won	
2001	Best Actor in a Musical	The Producers	Won	
2013	Best Actor in a Play	The Nance	Nominated	
2017	Best Featured Actor in a Play	The Front Page	Nominated	
2018	Best Featured Actor in a Play	Angels in America	Won	
2026	Best Actor in a Play	Death of a Salesman	Nominated	

== Theatre awards ==
Organizations	Year	Category	Work	Result	Ref.
Dorian Awards	2026	Outstanding Lead Performance in a Broadway Play	Death of a Salesman	Nominated	
Drama Desk Awards	1983	Outstanding Featured Actor in a Play	Present Laughter	Nominated	
Drama Desk Awards	1990	Outstanding Actor in a Play	The Lisbon Traviata	Won	
Drama Desk Awards	1992	Outstanding Actor in a Musical	Guys and Dolls	Won	
Drama Desk Awards	1995	Outstanding Featured Actor in a Play	Love! Valour! Compassion!	Won	
Drama Desk Awards	1996	Outstanding Actor in a Musical	A Funny Thing Happened on the Way to the Forum	Won	
Drama Desk Awards	2001	Outstanding Actor in a Musical	The Producers	Won	
Drama Desk Awards	2006	Outstanding Actor in a Play	Dedication or The Stuff of Dreams	Nominated	
Drama Desk Awards	2010	Outstanding Actor in a Musical	The Addams Family	Nominated	
Drama Desk Awards	2013	Outstanding Actor in a Play	The Nance	Nominated	
Drama Desk Awards	2017	Outstanding Featured Actor in a Play	The Front Page	Nominated	
Drama Desk Awards	2018	Outstanding Featured Actor in a Play	Angels in America	Won	
Drama Desk Awards	2026	Outstanding Lead Performance in a Play	Death of a Salesman	Nominated	
Drama League Awards	2007	Distinguished Performance	Butley	Nominated	
Drama League Awards	2008	Distinguished Performance	November	Nominated	
Drama League Awards	2010	Distinguished Performance	The Addams Family	Nominated	
Drama League Awards	2013	Distinguished Performance	The Nance	Won	
Drama League Awards	2015	Distinguished Performance	The Iceman Cometh / It's Only a Play	Citation	
Drama League Awards	2017	Distinguished Performance	The Front Page	Citation	
Drama League Awards	2018	Distinguished Performance	Angels in America	Citation	
Drama League Awards	2023	Distinguished Performance	Pictures From Home	Citation	
Drama League Awards	2026	Distinguished Performance	Death of a Salesman	Citation	
Lucille Lortel Award	1991	Outstanding Actor	The Lisbon Traviata	Won	
Lucille Lortel Award	2009	Outstanding Solo Show	Sleepwalk with Me	Nominated	
Obie Award	1992 and 1995	Sustained Excellence of Performance and the cast of Love! Valour! Compassion!		Won	
Outer Critics Circle Awards	2000	Outstanding Actor in a Musical	The Producers	Won	
Outer Critics Circle Awards	2008	Outstanding Actor in a Play	Waiting for Godot	Nominated	
Outer Critics Circle Awards	2009	Outstanding Actor in a Musical	The Addams Family	Nominated	
Outer Critics Circle Awards	2012	Outstanding Actor in a Play	The Nance	Won	
Outer Critics Circle Awards	2016	Outstanding Featured Actor in a Play	The Front Page	Won	
Outer Critics Circle Awards	2017	Outstanding Featured Actor in a Play	Angels in America	Nominated	
Outer Critics Circle Awards	2026	Outstanding Lead Performer in a Broadway Play	Death of a Salesman	Won	

== Miscellaneous awards ==
Organizations	Year	Category	Work	Result	Ref.
American Comedy Award	1996	Funniest Supporting Actor in a Motion Picture	Jeffrey	Nominated	
American Comedy Award	1997	Funniest Lead Actor in a Motion Picture	The Birdcage	Won	
Chicago Film Critics Association	1997	Best Supporting Actor	The Birdcage	Nominated	
HCA Awards	2022	Best Supporting Actor in a Streaming Series, Comedy	Only Murders in The Building	Nominated	
MTV Movie Award	1997	Best On-Screen Duo (shared with Robin Williams)	The Birdcage	Nominated	
Online Film & Television Award	1997	Best Lead Actor – Comedy or Musical	The Birdcage	Nominated	
Satellite Award	1997	Best Lead Actor – Comedy or Musical	The Birdcage	Nominated	
National Board of Review	2002	Best Acting by an Ensemble	Nicholas Nickleby	Won	

== Honorary awards ==
Organizations	Year	Award	Result	Ref.
GLAAD Media Award	2002	Vito Russo Award	Honored	
Hollywood Walk of Fame	2006	Motion Picture Star	Honored	
Drama League Awards	2010	Distinguished Achievement in Musical Theatre	Honored	
Theatre World Award	2019	John Willis Award	Honored	
Dorian Awards	2023	Timeless Star Award	Honored	
Drama Desk Awards	2024	Harold S. Prince Award	Honored	
Signature Theatre	2024	Stephen Sondheim Award	Honored	

== See also ==
- Nathan Lane on screen and stage
