= Nathan Lane on screen and stage =

American actor and writer

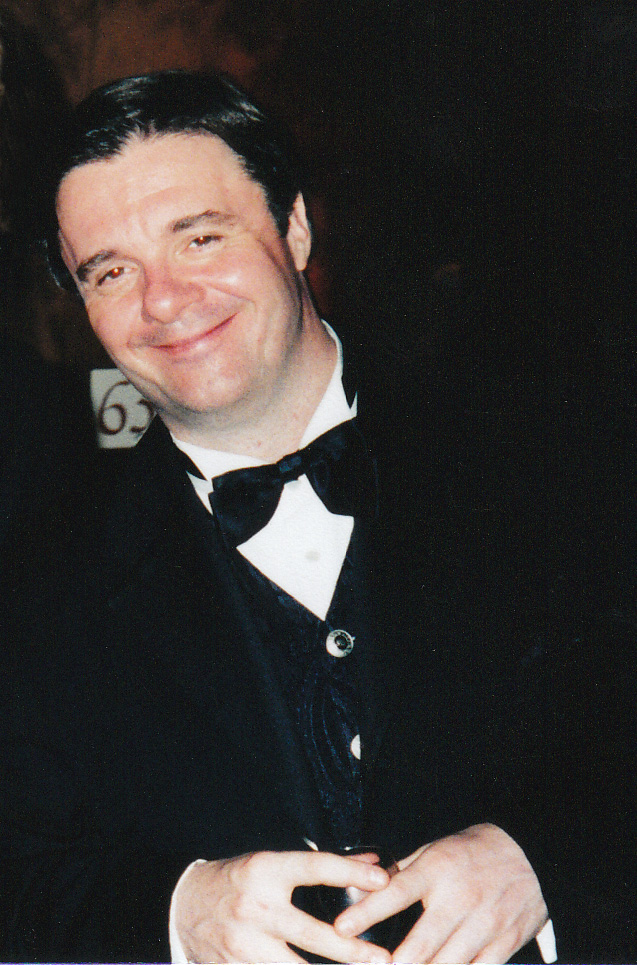
Lane at the 1998 Primetime Emmy Awards

Nathan Lane is an American actor known for his performances on stage and screen.

He is mostly recognised for his theatre roles on and off Broadway including his Tony Award-winning performances as Pseudolus in the 1996 revival of A Funny Thing Happened on the Way to the Forum (1996), as Max Bialystock in the original production of The Producers (2001), and as Roy Cohn in the revival of Tony Kushner's Angels in America. Lane's Broadway theatre performances also include Present Laughter (1982), Merlin (1984), Wind in the Willows (1985), Guys and Dolls (1992), Some Americans Abroad (1990), Laughter on the 23rd Floor (1994), Love! Valour! Compassion! (1995), The Man Who Came to Dinner (2000), The Frogs (2004), The Odd Couple (2005), Butley (2006), Waiting For Godot (2009), The Addams Family (2010), The Nance (2013), It's Only a Play and The Iceman Cometh (2014), The Front Page (2016), Gary: A Sequel to Titus Andronicus (2019), Pictures from Home (2023), and Death of a Salesman (2026).

Lane is known for his leading performances in the comedy films The Birdcage (1996), Mouse Hunt (1997), and The Producers (2005). He has also voiced Timon in the Disney animated film The Lion King (1994) and its sequels and Snowbell the cat in Stuart Little (1999). He is also known for his supporting performances in films such as Ironweed (1987), Frankie and Johnny (1991), Jeffrey (1995), Nicholas Nickleby (2002), Swing Vote (2008), Mirror Mirror (2012), The English Teacher (2013), Carrie Pilby (2016), Beau Is Afraid (2023), and Dicks: The Musical (2023).

Lane also is well known for his guest starring appearances in various television shows including Miami Vice, The Days and Nights of Molly Dodd, Frasier, Mad About You, Curb Your Enthusiasm, 30 Rock, Absolutely Fabulous, Modern Family, The Good Wife, and The Blacklist. Lane also appeared as F. Lee Bailey in The People v. O. J. Simpson: American Crime Story (2016) and as Detective Lewis Michener in the Showtime series Penny Dreadful: City of Angels (2020). He has recurring roles on Only Murders in the Building for Hulu starring Steve Martin, Martin Short, and Selena Gomez, for which he received his first Primetime Emmy and the HBO series The Gilded Age written by Julian Fellowes.

== Film ==
Year	Title	Role	Notes
1987	Ironweed	Harold Allen	
1990	The Lemon Sisters	Charlie Sorrell	
1990	Joe Versus the Volcano	Baw, Waponi Advance Man	
1991	He Said, She Said	Wally Thurman	
1991	Frankie and Johnny	Tim	
1993	Life with Mikey	Ed Chapman	
1993	Addams Family Values	Desk Sergeant	
1994	The Lion King	Timon	Voice
1995	Jeffrey	Father Dan	
1996	The Birdcage	Albert Goldman	
1997	Mouse Hunt	Ernest "Ernie" Smuntz	
1998	The Lion King II: Simba's Pride	Timon	Voice, direct-to-video
1999	Stuart Little	Snowbell Little	Voice
1999	At First Sight	Phil	
1999	Get Bruce!	Himself	Documentary
2000	Isn't She Great	Irving Mansfield	
2000	Love's Labour's Lost	Costard	
2000	Titan A.E.	Preed	Voice
2000	Trixie	Kirk Stans	
2002	Stuart Little 2	Snowbell Little	Voice
2002	Austin Powers in Goldmember	Mysterious Disco Man	Cameo
2002	Nicholas Nickleby	Vincent Crummles	
2004	Teacher's Pet	Spot/Scott	Voice
2004	Win a Date with Tad Hamilton!	Richard Levy the Driven	
2004	The Lion King 1½	Timon	Voice, direct-to-video
2005	The Producers	Max Bialystock	
2007	Trumbo	Himself	Documentary
2008	Swing Vote	Art Crumb	
2009	Astro Boy	Hammegg	Voice
2010	The Nutcracker	Uncle Albert	
2012	Mirror Mirror	Brighton	
2013	The English Teacher	Mr. Kapinas	
2016	Carrie Pilby	Dr. Petrov	
2016	No Pay, Nudity	Herschel Thalkin	
2017	The Vanishing of Sidney Hall	Harold	
2017	National Theatre Live: Angels in America	Roy Cohn	Theatrical release
2022	Broadway Rising	Himself	Documentrary
2023	Beau Is Afraid	Roger Stanwyck	
2023	Dicks: The Musical	Harris	
2023	Once Upon a Studio	Timon	Voice, short film
2024	Spellbound	Luno, the Oracle of the Moon	Voice
TBA	Cut Off	Damien	Post-production

== Television ==
Year	Title	Role	Notes
1981	Jacqueline Susann's Valley of the Dolls	Stage Manager	Television film
1982	One of the Boys	Jonathan Burns	13 episodes
1983	Great Performances	Mouse	Episode: "Alice in Wonderland"
1985	Miami Vice	Morty Price	Episode: "Buddies"
1989–91	The Days and Nights of Molly Dodd	Bing Shalimar	3 episodes
1995	Frasier	Phil	Episode: "Fool Me Once, Shame on You, Fool Me Twice..."
1995	Timon & Pumbaa	Timon	Voice; 10 episodes
1996	The Boys Next Door	Norman Bulansky	Television film
1997	Saturday Night Live	Himself (host)	Episode: "Nathan Lane/Metallica"
1997	Merry Christmas, George Bailey	Clarence	Television film
1998	Mad About You	Nathan Twilley	Episode: "Good Old Reliable Nathan"
1998–99	Encore! Encore!	Joseph Pinoni	13 episodes
1999–2000	George and Martha	George	Voice; 26 episodes
2000	The Man Who Came to Dinner	Sheridan Whiteside	PBS live television broadcast
2000–02	Teacher's Pet	Spot Helperman; Scott Leadready II	Voice; 34 episodes
2001	Laughter on the 23rd Floor	Max Prince	Television film
2002	Sex and the City	Bobby Fine	Episode: "I Love a Charade"
2003	Charlie Lawrence	Charlie Lawrence	7 episodes
2004	Curb Your Enthusiasm	Nathan Lane	Episode: "Opening Night"
2004	Absolutely Fabulous	Kunz	Episode: "White Box"
2007	30 Rock	Eddie Donaghy	Episode: "The Fighting Irish"
2008	A Muppet Christmas: Letters to Santa	Officer Frank Meany	Television film
2010–19	Modern Family	Pepper Saltzman	10 episodes
2012–14	The Good Wife	Clarke Hayden	15 episodes
2014	The Money	Gordon McCarren	Pilot
2014	Don Rickles: One Night Only	Himself (guest)	Spike television special
2016	The People v. O.J. Simpson: American Crime Story	F. Lee Bailey	8 episodes
2016	Difficult People	Himself	Episode: "Kessler Epstein Foundation"
2016	Maya & Marty	Connor Grayfield	Episode: "Steve Martin & Tina Fey"
2018	The Blacklist	Abraham Stern	Episode: "Abraham Stern (No. 100)"
2020	Penny Dreadful: City of Angels	Lewis Michener	Main role, 10 episodes
2021–25	Only Murders in the Building	Teddy Dimas	Recurring role
2022–25	The Gilded Age	Ward McAllister	Recurring role
2024	Monsters: The Lyle and Erik Menendez Story	Dominick Dunne	Main role, 5 episodes
2024	Elsbeth	Philip Cross	Episode: "Subscription to Murder"
2025	Saturday Night Live 50th Anniversary Special	Broadway producer / Himself	Television special
2025	Mid-Century Modern	Bunny Schneiderman	Main role; also executive producer
2025	Digman!	Yorbo	Voice; episode: “The Arky Trials”

== Theatre ==
Year	Production	Role	Venue	Production Type	Ref.
1978	A Midsummer Night's Dream	Francis Flute	Equity Library Theatre	Off-Broadway	
1982	Present Laughter	Roland Maule	Circle in the Square Theatre	Broadway	
1983–1984	Merlin	Prince Fergus	Mark Hellinger Theatre	Broadway	
1984	Love	Harry Berlin	Audrey Wood Theater	Off-Broadway	
1984	She Stoops to Conquer	Tony Lumpkin	Triplex Theatre	Off-Broadway	
1985	Measure for Measure	Pompey	Delacorte Theatre	Off-Broadway	
1985	Wind in the Willows	Toad	Nederlander Theatre	Broadway	
1986	The Common Pursuit	Nick Finchling	Promenade Theatre	Off Broadway	
1987	Claptrap	Harvey Wheatcraft	New York City Center	Off-Broadway	
1987	Broadway Bound	Stanley	Various	National tour	
1988	The Film Society	Jonathan Balton	McGinn-Cazale Theatre	Off-Broadway	
1989	In a Pig's Valise	James Taxi	McGinn-Cazale Theatre	Off-Broadway	
1989–1990	The Lisbon Traviata	Mendy	Promenade Theatre	Off-Broadway	
1989	Assassins	Samuel Byck	Studio 54	New York Reading	
1990	Bad Habits	Jason Pepper / Hugh Gumbs	New York City Center	Off–Broadway	
1990	Some Americans Abroad	Henry McNeil	Vivian Beaumont Theatre	Broadway	
1991	Lips Together, Teeth Apart	Sam Truman	New York City Center	Off-Broadway	
1991	On Borrowed Time	Mr. Brink	Circle in the Square Theatre	Broadway	
1992–1993	Guys and Dolls	Nathan Detroit	Martin Beck Theatre	Broadway	
1993–1994	Laughter on the 23rd Floor	Max Prince	Richard Rogers Theatre	Broadway	
1994	Love! Valour! Compassion!	Buzz Hauser	New York City Center	Off-Broadway	
1994	Love! Valour! Compassion!	Buzz Hauser	Walter Kerr Theatre	Broadway	
1995	The Wizard of Oz	The Cowardly Lion	Lincoln Center	Concert	
1996–1997	A Funny Thing Happened on the Way to the Forum	Pseudolus	St. James Theatre	Broadway	
1998	Mizlansky/Zilinsky or "Schmucks"	Davis Mizlansky	New York City Center	Off-Broadway	
1999	The Odd Couple	Oscar Madison	Skirball Cultural Center	Los Angeles	
1999	Do Re Mi	Hubert Cram	New York City Center	Off-Broadway	
2000	The Producers	Max Bialystock	Nola Rehearsal Studios	New York	
2000	The Frogs	Dionysus	Library of Congress	Washington DC	
2000	The Man Who Came to Dinner	Sheridan Whiteside	American Airlines Theatre	Broadway	
2001	The Producers	Max Bialystock	Cadillac Palace Theatre	Chicago	
2001–2002	The Producers	Max Bialystock	St. James Theatre	Broadway	
2003	The Play What I Wrote	Mystery Guest Star	Lyceum Theatre	Broadway	
2003	Trumbo: Red White and Blacklisted	Dalton Trumbo	Westside Theatre	Off-Broadway	
2003	Butley	Ben Butley	Huntington Theatre Company	Boston	
2003–2004	The Producers	Max Bialystock	St. James Theatre	Broadway	
2004	The Frogs	Dionysus	Vivian Beaumont Theatre	Broadway	
2004–2005	The Producers	Max Bialystock	Theatre Royal, Drury Lane	West End	
2005	Dedication or the Stuff of Dreams	Lou Nuncle	59E59 Theaters/Theater A	Off-Broadway	
2005–2006	The Odd Couple	Oscar Madison	Brooks Atkinson Theatre	Broadway	
2006–2007	Butley	Ben Butley	Booth Theatre	Broadway	
2007–2008	November	Charles Smith	Ethel Barrymore Theatre	Broadway	
2009	Waiting for Godot	Estragon	Studio 54	Broadway	
2009–2010	The Addams Family	Gomez Addams	Oriental Theatre	Chicago	
2010–2011	The Addams Family	Gomez Addams	Lunt-Fontanne Theatre	Broadway	
2012	The Iceman Cometh	Theodore "Hickey" Hickman	Goodman Theater	Chicago	
2013	The Nance	Chauncey Miles	Lyceum Theatre	Broadway	
2014	Guys and Dolls	Nathan Detroit	Carnegie Hall	Concert	
2014–2015	It's Only a Play	Jimmy Wicker	Bernard B. Jacobs Theatre	Broadway	
2015	The Iceman Cometh	Theodore "Hickey" Hickman	Brooklyn Academy of Music	New York	
2016	White Rabbit, Red Rabbit	Himself	Westside Theatre	Off-Broadway	
2016–2017	The Front Page	Walter Burns	Broadhurst Theatre	Broadway	
2017	Angels in America	Roy Cohn	Lyttelton Theatre	West End	
2018	Angels in America	Roy Cohn	Neil Simon Theatre	Broadway	
2019	Gary: A Sequel to Titus Andronicus	Gary	Booth Theatre	Broadway	
2023	Pictures from Home	Irving	Studio 54	Broadway	
2023	Gutenberg! The Musical!	Producer (one night only)	James Earl Jones Theatre	Broadway	
2023	The Frogs	Host / Narrator	Lincoln Center	Concert	
2026	Death of a Salesman	Willy Loman	Winter Garden Theatre	Broadway	

== Video games ==
Year	Film	Role	Notes
1995	Animated Storybook: The Lion King	Timon	Voice

== Other credits ==
- Presented Mike Birbiglia's (2008) Off-Broadway show Sleepwalk With Me.
- Provided the voice of Tom Morrow, the Audio-Animatronic host of Disneyland's Innoventions attraction.
- Children's book Naughty Mabel, written with husband Devlin Elliott, published by Simon and Schuster, released in October 2015. A second book, Naughty Mabel Sees It All was released in October 2016.
- Wrote the introduction to Neil Simon's Memoirs, published by Simon and Schuster.

== See also ==
- List of awards and nominations received by Nathan Lane
