= Ann Roth =

American costume designer (born 1931)

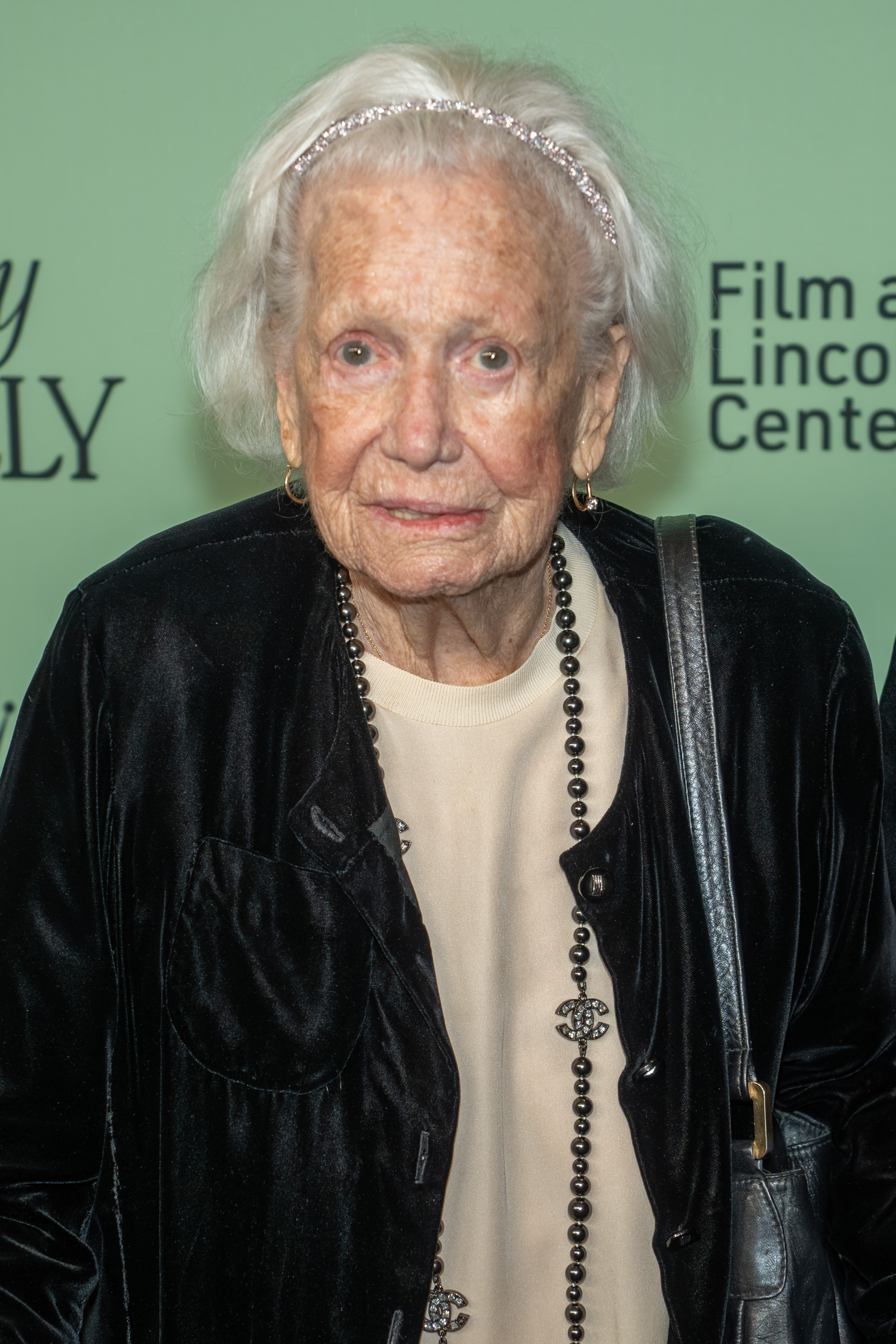
- Roth in 2025
- Born: Ann Bishop Roth; October 30, 1931 (age 94); Hanover, Pennsylvania, U.S.
- Education: Carnegie Mellon University (BFA)
- Occupation: Costume designer
- Years active: 1957–present

Ann Bishop Roth (born October 30, 1931) is an American costume designer. She has received numerous accolades, including two Academy Awards, two BAFTA Awards, and a Tony Award, in addition to nominations for three Emmy Awards. In 2011, she was inducted into the American Theater Hall of Fame.

Roth gained prominence for her collaborations with directors John Schlesinger, Mike Nichols, Anthony Minghella, and Stephen Daldry. She has been nominated for the Academy Award for Best Costume Design five times, winning two awards for The English Patient (1996) and Ma Rainey's Black Bottom (2020). She has also received four nominations for the BAFTA Award for Best Costume Design, winning for The Day of the Locust (1975) and Ma Rainey's Black Bottom. Roth also makes a cameo appearance in Greta Gerwig's fantasy comedy film Barbie (2023).

== Life and career ==
Roth was born in Hanover, Pennsylvania, the daughter of Eleanor and James Roth. Roth is a Carnegie Mellon graduate who began her career as a scenery painter for the Pittsburgh Opera. She intended to remain in the field of production design until she met Irene Sharaff at the Bucks County Playhouse. Sharaff invited her to California to assist her with costumes on the film Brigadoon and suggested Roth apprentice with her for five films and five Broadway productions before setting out on her own.

Roth's first Hollywood film was 1964's The World of Henry Orient, where her designs included "monogrammed handmade yellow silk pajamas" for glamorous womanizer Peter Sellers.

According to Glenn Frankel, Roth "designed not just costumes but characters" for the 1969 film Midnight Cowboy. Roth found elegant but grimy white pants for Dustin Hoffman's character Ratso Rizzo on street-sale tables in New York City. Because Jon Voight's fringed suede jacket had to "look real and unhip," Roth made it herself. For Brenda Vaccaro's socialite character to wear in a sex scene, Roth paid $200 for a fox-fur jacket owned by one of her neighbors.

Roth as costume designer created a "show-stopping" nightgown for Barbra Streisand to wear in her first non-musical film The Owl and the Pussycat (1970). The short black nightgown featured appliqué pink hands cupping the breasts and, to quote Roth's own description, "a heart on her pee-pee." Interviewed in 2013 about the origins of the costume idea, Roth said that her research included "looking for dirty, erotic, skuzzy underwear" in the pornographic magazine Screw, after which "somehow or another I made it up." Roth later re-used her hands-on-breasts design for the 2013 stage play The Nance, which won that year's Tony Award for costume design.

Roth's first Oscar nomination was for 1984's Places in the Heart, set in Depression-era Texas. Roth persuaded Sally Field that, for her "going-into-town-to-ask-for-a-loan-at-the-bank" scenes, a 1930s-type crotchless girdle would help her to walk and sit the right way. The costume Oscar that year, however, went to Miloš Forman's Amadeus.

Roth's costumes for three distinct time frames in The English Patient (1996) earned her first Oscar. According to producer Saul Zaentz, Roth worked for half her usual salary on the film "because she believed in the screenplay." Roth's research for the costumes included the British Royal Geographical Society archives and 1930s photos of Egypt by photojournalist Lee Miller. Many of the film's varied military uniforms were authentic from the period; others were copied line-for-line from originals by a Savile Row tailor.

Also in 1996, Roth did costumes for The Birdcage, a comedy film starring Robin Williams and Nathan Lane as the flamboyant owners of a Florida drag club. Talking about his costume, Williams remembered "those ballroom pants and the silk shirts with the shoulder pads. The details were amazing. This was a guy who was still living in the ’70s. The clothes captured exactly who Armand was for me."

Her most-awarded film was 2020's Ma Rainey's Black Bottom, where her costume designs (including flapper costumes and a rubber body suit for Viola Davis based on the body measurements of Aretha Franklin) won the Costume Designers Guild Award for Excellence in Period Film, Britain's BAFTA, and the Academy Award for Best Costume Design.

In the 2023 film Barbie, Roth appears onscreen in a cameo role, portraying and credited as "the woman on a bench." In the scene, Barbie sits down besides Roth and tells the 91 year-old that she is "so beautiful", and Roth responds with a smile, "I know it." In a Rolling Stone interview, director Greta Gerwig said that the brief scene "doesn’t lead anywhere" but "If I cut the scene, I don’t know what this movie is about." Maureen Dowd in The New York Times described Roth's interaction with Barbie as a "pivotal scene."

Roth's more than one hundred screen credits for costume design include The World of Henry Orient, Midnight Cowboy, Klute, Working Girl, Silkwood, The Unbearable Lightness of Being, The Mambo Kings, The Birdcage, Primary Colors, Cold Mountain, Closer, Freedomland, The Good Shepherd, Margot at the Wedding, Mamma Mia!, Evening, and Ma Rainey's Black Bottom.

Roth's dozens of stage credits include The Odd Couple, The Star-Spangled Girl, Purlie, Seesaw, They're Playing Our Song, The Best Little Whorehouse in Texas, Biloxi Blues, Butley, The Vertical Hour, Deuce, and The Waverly Gallery.

=== Multiple collaborations ===
- 13 – Mike Nichols: Silkwood, Heartburn, Biloxi Blues, Working Girl, Postcards from the Edge, Regarding Henry, Wolf, The Birdcage, Primary Colors, What Planet Are You From, Wit, Angels in America, Closer
- 5 – John Schlesinger: Midnight Cowboy, The Day of the Locust, Marathon Man, Honky Tonk Freeway, Pacific Heights
- 4 – Sidney Lumet: The Morning After, Family Business, Q&A, A Stranger Among Us
- 3 – Alan J. Pakula: Klute, Rollover, Consenting Adults
- 3 – Anthony Minghella: The English Patient, The Talented Mr. Ripley, Cold Mountain
- 3 – Stephen Daldry: The Hours, The Reader, Extremely Loud & Incredibly Close
- 3 – Brian De Palma: Dressed to Kill, Blow Out, The Bonfire of the Vanities
- 3 – Herbert Ross: The Owl and the Pussycat, The Goodbye Girl, California Suite
- 3 – Hal Ashby: Coming Home, Second-Hand Hearts, The Slugger's Wife
- 3 – George Roy Hill: The World of Henry Orient, The World According to Garp, Funny Farm
- 3 – Noah Baumbach: Margot at the Wedding, While We're Young, White Noise
- 2 – M. Night Shyamalan: Signs, The Village
- 2 – Frank Oz: In & Out, The Stepford Wives

== Filmography ==
=== Film ===
Year	Title	Director	Notes
1964	The World of Henry Orient	George Roy Hill	
1966	A Fine Madness	Irvin Kershner	
1967	Up the Down Staircase	Robert Mulligan	
1968	Sweet November	Robert Ellis Miller	
1968	Pretty Poison	Noel Black	
1969	Midnight Cowboy	John Schlesinger	
1970	The Owl and the Pussycat	Herbert Ross	
1970	The People Next Door	David Greene	
1970	Jenny	George Bloomfield	
1971	The Pursuit of Happiness	Robert Mulligan	
1971	They Might Be Giants	Anthony Harvey	
1971	Klute	Alan J. Pakula	
1972	The Valachi Papers	Terence Young	with Giorgio Desideri
1974	Crazy Joe	Carlo Lizzani	
1974	Law and Disorder	Ivan Passer	
1975	The Day of the Locust	John Schlesinger	
1975	Mandingo	Richard Fleischer	
1975	The Happy Hooker	Nicholas Sgarro	
1976	Burnt Offerings	Dan Curtis	
1976	Murder by Death	Robert Moore	
1976	Drum	Steve Carver	
1976	Marathon Man	John Schlesinger	with Robert De Mora; uncredited
1976	Independence	John Huston	Short
1977	The Goodbye Girl	Herbert Ross	
1978	Coming Home	Hal Ashby	
1978	Nunzio	Paul Williams	
1978	California Suite	Herbert Ross	
1979	Hair	Miloš Forman	
1979	Promises in the Dark	Jerome Hellman	
1980	Dressed to Kill	Brian De Palma	with Gary Jones
1980	9 to 5	Colin Higgins	
1980	The Island	Michael Ritchie	
1981	Only When I Laugh	Glenn Jordan	
1981	Second-Hand Hearts	Hal Ashby	
1981	Rollover	Alan J. Pakula	
1981	Blow Out	Brian De Palma	
1981	Honky Tonk Freeway	John Schlesinger	
1982	The World According to Garp	George Roy Hill	
1983	Silkwood	Mike Nichols	
1983	The Man Who Loved Women	Blake Edwards	
1983	The Survivors	Michael Ritchie	
1984	Places in the Heart	Robert Benton	
1985	Jagged Edge	Richard Marquand	
1985	Sweet Dreams	Karel Reisz	
1985	The Slugger's Wife	Hal Ashby	
1985	Maxie	Paul Aaron	
1986	The Morning After	Sidney Lumet	
1986	Heartburn	Mike Nichols	
1988	The Unbearable Lightness of Being	Philip Kaufman	
1988	Stars and Bars	Pat O'Connor	
1988	Biloxi Blues	Mike Nichols	
1988	Funny Farm	George Roy Hill	
1988	Working Girl	Mike Nichols	
1989	Her Alibi	Bruce Beresford	
1989	Family Business	Sidney Lumet	
1989	The January Man	Pat O'Connor	with Neil Spisak
1990	Everybody Wins	Karel Reisz	
1990	Q & A	Sidney Lumet	with Neil Spisak
1990	The Bonfire of the Vanities	Brian De Palma	
1990	Postcards from the Edge	Mike Nichols	
1990	Pacific Heights	John Schlesinger	with Bridget Kelly
1991	Regarding Henry	Mike Nichols	
1992	The Mambo Kings	Arne Glimcher	with Gary Jones and Bridget Kelly
1992	School Ties	Robert Mandel	
1992	Consenting Adults	Alan J. Pakula	with Gary Jones
1992	A Stranger Among Us	Sidney Lumet	with Gary Jones
1993	Dennis the Menace	Nick Castle	with Bridget Kelly
1993	Dave	Ivan Reitman	
1994	Guarding Tess	Hugh Wilson	with Sue Gandy
1994	Wolf	Mike Nichols	
1995	Sabrina	Sydney Pollack	with Gary Jones
1995	Just Cause	Arne Glimcher	with Gary Jones
1996	The English Patient	Anthony Minghella	
1996	Before and After	Barbet Schroeder	
1996	The Birdcage	Mike Nichols	
1997	In & Out	Frank Oz	
1998	The Siege	Edward Zwick	
1998	Primary Colors	Mike Nichols	with Gary Jones
1998	Hush	Jonathan Darby	
1999	The Out-of-Towners	Sam Weisman	
1999	The Talented Mr. Ripley	Anthony Minghella	with Gary Jones
2000	Finding Forrester	Gus Van Sant	
2000	What Planet Are You From?	Mike Nichols	
2001	Someone like You	Tony Goldwyn	with Michelle Matland
2002	The Hours	Stephen Daldry	
2002	Signs	M. Night Shyamalan	
2002	Changing Lanes	Roger Michell	
2003	Cold Mountain	Anthony Minghella	with Carlo Poggioli
2004	The Stepford Wives	Frank Oz	
2004	The Village	M. Night Shyamalan	
2004	Closer	Mike Nichols	
2006	The Good Shepherd	Robert De Niro	
2006	Freedomland	Joe Roth	with Michelle Matland
2007	Evening	Lajos Koltai	with Michelle Matland
2007	Margot at the Wedding	Noah Baumbach	
2008	Mamma Mia!	Phyllida Lloyd	
2008	Doubt	John Patrick Shanley	
2008	What Just Happened	Barry Levinson	
2008	The Reader	Stephen Daldry	with Donna Maloney
2009	Julie & Julia	Nora Ephron	
2010	Rabbit Hole	John Cameron Mitchell	
2010	Last Night	Massy Tadjedin	
2011	A Little Bit of Heaven	Nicole Kassell	
2011	The Resident	Antti Jokinen	
2011	Mr. Popper's Penguins	Mark Waters	
2011	Extremely Loud and Incredibly Close	Stephen Daldry	
2012	Safe	Boaz Yakin	with Michelle Matland
2012	Hope Springs	David Frankel	
2013	The Way, Way Back	Nat Faxon & Jim Rash	with Michelle Matland
2014	Lullaby	Andrew Levitas	
2014	While We're Young	Noah Baumbach	
2015	Ricki and the Flash	Jonathan Demme	
2016	The Girl on the Train	Tate Taylor	with Michelle Matland
2017	The Yellow Birds	Alexandre Moors	with Lisa Loen and Donna Maloney
2017	The Only Living Boy in New York	Marc Webb	with Michelle Matland
2017	The Post	Steven Spielberg	
2018	The Seagull	Michael Mayer	
2020	Ma Rainey's Black Bottom	George C. Wolfe	
2021	The Humans	Stephen Karam	
2022	White Noise	Noah Baumbach	
2023	Are You There God? It's Me, Margaret.	Kelly Fremon Craig	
2023	Barbie	Greta Gerwig	Cameo
2025	Ella McCay	James L. Brooks	with Matthew Pachtman

=== Television ===
Year	Title	Director	Notes
1971	All the Way Home	Fred Coe	Television movie
1972	The Snoop Sisters	Leonard B. Stern	Episode: "The Female Instinct"
1974	Great Performances	Kirk Browning & Ellis Rabb	Episode: "Enemies"
1975	Valley Forge	Fielder Cook	Television movie
1977	The Royal Family	Kirk Browning & Ellis Rabb	Television movie
1977	The Best of Families	Several	Miniseries
1987	American Playhouse	Jerry Zaks & Kirk Browning	Episode: "The House of Blue Leaves"
2001	Wit	Mike Nichols	Television movie, HBO
2003	Angels in America	Mike Nichols	Miniseries, HBO
2011	Mildred Pierce	Todd Haynes	Miniseries, HBO

== Theatre ==
Work as a costume designer

Year	Title	Venue
1957	Small War on Murray Hill	Ethel Barrymore Theatre, Broadway
1958	Maybe Tuesday	Playhouse Theatre, Broadway
1958	Make a Million	Morosco Theatre, Broadway
1958	Disenchanted	Coronet Theatre, Broadway
1959	A Desert Incident	John Golden Theatre, Broadway
1959	Chéri	Morosco Theatre, Broadway
1959	Take Me Along	Shubert Theatre, Broadway
1960	The Cool World	Eugene O'Neill Theatre, Broadway
1960	Face of a Hero	Eugene O'Neill Theatre, Broadway
1961	A Far Country	Music Box Theatre, Broadway
1961	Purlie Victorious	Longacre Theatre, Broadway
1961	Look, We've Come Through	Hudson Theatre, Broadway
1962	Isle of Children	Cort Theatre, Broadway
1962	Venus at Large	Morosco Theatre, Broadway
1963	Natural Affection	Booth Theatre, Broadway
1963	Children from Their Games	Morosco Theatre, Broadway
1963	A Case of Libel	Longacre Theatre, Broadway
1963	The Public Eye	Morosco Theatre, Broadway
1964	The Last Analysis	Belasco Theatre, Broadway
1964	Slow Dance on the Killing Ground	Plymouth Theatre, Broadway
1964	I Had a Ball	Martin Beck Theatre, Broadway
1965	The Odd Couple	Plymouth Theatre, Broadway
1965	Mrs. Dally	John Golden Theatre, Broadway
1965	The Impossible Years	Playhouse Theatre, Broadway
1966	The Wayward Stork	Richard Rodgers Theatre, Broadway
1966	The Star-Spangled Girl	Plymouth Theatre, Broadway
1967	Something Different	Cort Theatre, Broadway
1968	Happiness Is Just a Little Thing Called a Rolls Royce	Ethel Barrymore Theatre, Broadway
1969	Play It Again, Sam	Broadhurst Theatre, Broadway
1969	My Daughter, Your Son	Booth Theatre, Broadway
1969	Tiny Alice	ANTA Theatre, Broadway
1969	Three Sisters	ANTA Theatre, Broadway
1970	Gantry	George Abbot Theatre, Broadway
1970	Purlie	ANTA Theatre, Broadway
1970	The Engagement Baby	Helen Hayes Theatre, Broadway
1971	Father's Day	John Golden Theatre, Broadway
1972	Fun City	Morosco Theatre, Broadway
1972	Twelfth Night	Vivian Beaumont Theatre, Broadway
1972	Children! Children!	Ritz Theatre, Broadway
1972	6 Rms Riv Vu	Helen Hayes Theatre, Broadway; Lunt-Fontaine Theatre, Broadway
1972	Enemies	Vivian Beaumont Theatre, Broadway
1972–73	Purlie	Billy Rose Theatre, Broadway
1973	The Merchant of Venice	Vivian Beaumont Theatre, Broadway
1973	Seesaw	Uris Theatre, Broadway; Mark Hellinger Theatre, Broadway
1973	The Women	46th Street Theatre, Broadway
1976	The Royal Family	Helen Hayes Theatre, Broadway
1976	The Heiress	Broadhurst Theatre, Broadway
1977	The Importance of Being Earnest	Circle in the Square Theatre, Broadway
1978	Do You Turn Somersaults?	46th Street Theatre, Broadway
1978–82	The Best Little Whorehouse in Texas	46th Street Theatre, Broadway
1978–79	The Crucifer of Blood	Helen Hayes Theatre, Broadway
1978	First Monday in the Morning	Majestic Theatre, Broadway
1979–81	They're Playing Our Song	Imperial Theatre, Broadway
1979	Strangers	John Golden Theatre, Broadway
1980–81	Lunch Hour	Ethel Barrymore Theatre, Broadway
1982–84	The Best Little Whorehouse in Texas	Eugene O'Neill Theatre, Broadway
1982–83	Present Laughter	Circle in the Square Theatre, Broadway
1983	The Misanthrope	Circle in the Square Theatre, Broadway
1984	Open Admissions	Music Box Theatre, Broadway
1984–85	Design for Living	Circle in the Square Theatre, Broadway
1984–85	Hurlyburly	Ethel Barrymore Theatre, Broadway
1985–86	Biloxi Blues	Neil Simon Theatre, Broadway
1985	Arms and the Man	Circle in the Square Theatre, Broadway
1985–86	The Odd Couple	Broadhurst Theatre, Broadway
1985–86	Singin' in the Rain	Gershwin Theatre, Broadway
1986–87	Social Security	Ethel Barrymore Theatre, Broadway
1986–87	The House of Blue Leaves	Vivian Beaumont Theatre, Broadway; Plymouth Theatre, Broadway
1986–87	Born Yesterday	46th Street Theatre, Broadway
1992	Death and the Maiden	Brooks Atkinson Theatre, Broadway
1992	A Small Family Business	Music Box Theatre, Broadway
1993	Any Given Day	Longacre Theatre, Broadway
1994	What's Wrong With This Picture?	Brooks Atkinson Theatre, Broadway
1996–97	Present Laughter	Walter Kerr Theatre, Play
2000–02	The Tale of the Allergist's Wife	Walter Kerr Theatre, Play
2005–06	The Odd Couple	Brooks Atkinson Theatre, Broadway
2006–07	Butley	Booth Theatre, Broadway
2006–07	The Vertical Hour	Music Box Theatre, Broadway
2007	The Year of Magical Thinking	Booth Theatre, Broadway
2007	Deuce	Music Box Theatre, Broadway
2009	Hedda Gabler	American Airlines Theatre, Broadway
2011	The Book of Mormon	Eugene O'Neill Theatre, Broadway
2012	Death of a Salesman	Ethel Barrymore Theatre, Broadway
2012	Gore Vidal's The Best Man	Gerald Schoenfeld Theatre, Broadway
2013	The Nance	Lyceum Theatre, Broadway
2013	The Testament of Mary	Walter Kerr Theatre, Broadway
2013	I'll Eat You Last: A Chat with Sue Mengers	Booth Theatre, Broadway
2013–14	Betrayal	Ethel Barrymore Theatre, Broadway
2014	A Raisin in the Sun	Ethel Barrymore Theatre, Broadway
2014–15	This is Our Youth	Cort Theatre, Broadway
2014–15	It's Only a Play	Gerald Schoenfeld Theatre, Broadway; Bernard B. Jacobs Theatre, Broadway
2014–15	A Delicate Balance	John Golden Theatre, Broadway
2015	Fish in the Dark	Cort Theatre, Broadway
2015–16	Sylvia	Cort Theatre, Broadway
2015–16	Misery	Broadhurst Theatre, Broadway
2016	Shuffle Along, or, the Making of the Musical; Sensation of 1921 and All That Followed	Music Box Theatre, Broadway
2016	Blackbird	Belasco Theatre, Broadway
2016–17	The Front Page	Broadhurst Theatre, Broadway
2017–18	Meteor Shower	Cort Theatre, Broadway
2018	Three Tall Women	John Golden Theatre, Broadway
2018	The Iceman Cometh	Bernard B. Jacobs Theatre, Broadway
2018	Carousel	Imperial Theatre, Broadway
2018	To Kill a Mockingbird	Shubert Theatre, Broadway
2018–19	The Waverly Gallery	John Golden Theatre, Broadway
2018–19	The Prom	Longacre Theatre, Broadway
2019	King Lear	Cort Theatre, Broadway
2019	Gary: A Sequel to Titus Andronicus	Booth Theatre, Broadway
2020	Who's Afraid of Virginia Woolf?	Booth Theatre, Broadway

== Awards and nominations ==
Academy Awards

Year	Category	Nominated work	Result	Ref.
1984	Best Costume Design	Places in the Heart	Nominated	
1996	Best Costume Design	The English Patient	Won	
1999	Best Costume Design	The Talented Mr. Ripley	Nominated	
2002	Best Costume Design	The Hours	Nominated	
2020	Best Costume Design	Ma Rainey's Black Bottom	Won	

Primetime Emmy Awards

Year	Category	Nominated work	Result	Ref.
1986	Outstanding Costumes - Miniseries	Roanoak: Part 1	Nominated	
2004	Outstanding Costumes - Miniseries	Angels in America: Perestroika	Nominated	
2011	Outstanding Costumes - Miniseries	Mildred Pierce: Part 2	Nominated	

Tony Awards

Year	Category	Nominated work	Result	Ref.
1976	Best Costume Design	The Royal Family	Nominated	
1979	Best Costume Design	The Crucifer of Blood	Nominated	
1986	Best Costume Design	The House of Blue Leaves	Nominated	
2011	Best Costume Design in a Musical	The Book of Mormon	Nominated	
2013	Best Costume Design of a Play	The Nance	Won	
2016	Best Costume Design in a Musical	Shuffle Along	Nominated	
2018	Best Costume Design in a Musical	Carousel	Nominated	
2018	Best Costume Design of a Play	Three Tall Women	Nominated	
2018	Best Costume Design of a Play	The Iceman Cometh	Nominated	
2019	Best Costume Design of a Play	To Kill a Mockingbird	Nominated	
2019	Best Costume Design of a Play	Gary: A Sequel to Titus Andronicus	Nominated	
