= List of awards and nominations received by Ann Roth =

List of Ann Roth awards
Award	Wins	Nominations
Academy Awards	2	5
British Academy Film Awards	2	4
Primetime Emmy Award	0	3
Tony Award	1	12

Ann Roth is an American costume designer known for her work in film, television and the Broadway stage.

== Major associations ==
=== Academy Awards ===
Year	Category	Nominated work	Result	Ref.
1984	Best Costume Design	Places in the Heart	Nominated	
1996	Best Costume Design	The English Patient	Won	
1999	Best Costume Design	The Talented Mr. Ripley	Nominated	
2002	Best Costume Design	The Hours	Nominated	
2020	Best Costume Design	Ma Rainey's Black Bottom	Won	

=== BAFTA Awards ===
Year	Category	Nominated work	Result	Ref.
1975	Best Costume Design	The Day of the Locust	Won	
1996	Best Costume Design	The English Patient	Nominated	
2003	Best Costume Design	Cold Mountain	Nominated	
2020	Best Costume Design	Ma Rainey's Black Bottom	Won	

=== Emmy Awards ===
Year	Category	Nominated work	Result	Ref.
1986	Outstanding Costumes - Miniseries	Roanoak: Part 1	Nominated	
2004	Outstanding Costumes - Miniseries	Angels in America	Nominated	
2011	Outstanding Costumes - Miniseries	Mildred Pierce	Nominated	

=== Tony Awards ===
Year	Category	Nominated work	Result	Ref.
1976	Best Costume Design	The Royal Family	Nominated	
1979	Best Costume Design	The Crucifer of Blood	Nominated	
1986	Best Costume Design	The House of Blue Leaves	Nominated	
2011	Best Costume Design in a Musical	The Book of Mormon	Nominated	
2013	Best Costume Design of a Play	The Nance	Won	
2016	Best Costume Design in a Musical	Shuffle Along	Nominated	
2018	Best Costume Design in a Musical	Carousel	Nominated	
2018	Best Costume Design of a Play	Three Tall Women	Nominated	
2018	Best Costume Design of a Play	The Iceman Cometh	Nominated	
2019	Best Costume Design of a Play	To Kill a Mockingbird	Nominated	
2019	Best Costume Design of a Play	Gary: A Sequel to Titus Andronicus	Nominated	

== Industry awards ==
=== Costume Designers Guild Awards ===
Year	Category	Nominated work	Result	Ref.
1999	Excellence in Period/Fantasy Film	The Talented Mr. Ripley	Nominated	
2002	Career Achievement Award	—N/a	Honored	
2003	Excellence in Period/Fantasy Television Series	Angels in America	Nominated	
2008	Excellence in Contemporary Film	Mamma Mia!	Nominated	
2009	Excellence in Period Film	Julie & Julia	Nominated	
2011	Outstanding Made for Television Movie or Miniseries	Mildred Pierce	Nominated	
2020	Excellence in Period Film	Ma Rainey's Black Bottom	Won	

=== Critics' Choice Awards ===
Year	Category	Nominated work	Result	Ref.
2020	Best Costume Design	Ma Rainey's Black Bottom	Won	

=== Drama Desk Awards ===
Year	Category	Nominated work	Result	Ref.
1976	Outstanding Costume Design	The Royal Family	Nominated	
1985	Outstanding Costume Design	Design For Living	Nominated	
1997	Outstanding Costume Design	Present Laughter	Nominated	
2016	Outstanding Costume Design of a Musical	Shuffle Along	Won	
2017	Outstanding Costume Design of a Play	The Front Page	Nominated	
2018	Outstanding Costume Design of a Play	Three Tall Women	Nominated	

=== Satellite Awards ===
Year	Category	Nominated work	Result	Ref.
2020	Best Costume Design	Ma Rainey's Black Bottom	Nominated	

== Honorary awards ==
Year	Award	Category	Nominated work	Result	Ref.
2000	Theatre Development Fund	Irene Sharaff Award for Lifetime Achievement Award	—N/a	Honored	
2011	American Theater Hall of Fame	Lifetime Achievement	—N/a	Inducted	
