= Baby box =

Baby box may refer to:

- Baby hatch or foundling wheel, a place a baby, usually newborn, is brought anonymously to be cared for by others, often leading to adoption
  - Safe Haven Baby Boxes, an organization that provides such hatches
- Maternity package, also called baby box, a kit of baby clothes and equipment given to pregnant women in some countries
- The Baby Box, a play directed by Stephen Henry
- Air crib, an easily cleaned, temperature and humidity-controlled crib designed by B. F. Skinner
- One of the areas in the Ministry of Sound nightclub
