= Stephen Henry =

British stage director, theatre producer, and educator

- Born: 27 September 1968 (age 58); London, England
- Education: Trinity Catholic High School, Woodford Green St Mary's University College Drama Studio London London Academy of Music and Dramatic Art University of Cambridge Institute of Education, University College London
- Occupations: Theatre director, Theatre producer, Teacher
- Spouse: Dr. José Ricardo Gutiérrez Vargas m:2010 d:2017

Stephen Henry is a British stage director, a theatre producer, and an educator.

== Education ==
Stephen Henry read Education (QTS) and Drama at St Mary's College, Theatre Directing at DSL and LAMDA, studied International Education at University of Cambridge and Leadership at UCL.

== Early career ==
Henry started his career by directing, for his graduate school production, Terrence McNally's Love! Valour! Compassion! which won both The Best Ensemble Award and The Best Actor Award at the 1998 Edinburgh Festival. The acclaimed production transferred to the Tristan Bates Theatre, London and sold out its limited run. He followed this inaugural production with Frank Wedekind's Spring Awakening at the Jermyn Street Theatre, London receiving The Bulldog Prinsep Theatrical Fund Award for New Directors. Henry's interpretation of Spring Awakening later moved to the Tristan Bates Theatre.

He also directed the UK premiere production of To Have and To Hold by Paul Harris, with Cory English, and the European premiere of Terrence McNally's passion play Corpus Christi, at the Edinburgh Festival Fringe in 1999, with Stephen Billington and Mel Raido. The production transferred to the Pleasance Theatre, London, produced by Guy Chapman Associates and Sarah Earl Productions, breaking box-office records for the theatre and attracting political demonstrations and a fatwa for its author.

Henry's Oxford Playhouse revival of Another Country, by Julian Mitchell, reopened the Arts Theatre in the West End where he also developed a new transgender themed play by Sam McCartney, Body Language (Being Olivia).

Other projects include the controversial play tackling the subject of pedophilia, ecstasy + GRACE by James Martin Charlton, at the Finborough Theatre, London where he produced Pains of Youth by Ferdinand Bruckner starring Stephen Billington, Stevie Jay in Life, Love and other works in progress and a new play exploring the subject of dementia, The Silent Treatment by Chris Pickles.

He directed rehearsed workshops of Fuddy Meers by David Lindsay-Abaire for the National Theatre Studio and Southwark Playhouse and The Lightning Child by Elizabeth Hopley at The Old Vic.

Henry directed Five Flights by Canadian author Adam Bock, at the Pleasance Theatre with comic Scott Capurro, and developed Matthew Todd's play Blowing Whistles at the Jermyn Street Theatre for Trilby Productions.

His King's Head Theatre production of The Lisbon Traviata, starring David Bamber and Marcus D'Amico, was voted The Best Off-West End Production in 2004, Whatsonstage Awards. He was also the original director of the London production of Visiting Mr. Green by Jeff Baron at the New End Theatre.

For over a decade, he directed numerous graduate showcases, student productions and scene studies including Uncle Vanya, Kiss of the Spider Woman, and My Heart is a Suitcase for Drama Studio London where he taught acting and theatre directing.

Henry worked as a volunteer for the first Pride London Festival in 2004/2005 and host The Pride London Season of Theatre with main productions including the page-to-stage adaptations of Go Fish (film) (Zip Antics Theatre Company) and New Boy (Questors Theatre), a new play Citizenship by Mark Ravenhill, as part of the National Theatre Connections Programme, and L'homosexual by Copi directed by Carole Menduni. The season also included Fiona Staniland as Darlene Meatrick, Nathan Martin in I wish it so! and The International Play Competition presenting rehearsed readings of 12 new LGBTQ+ plays. The festival also included Justin Bond in concert at Soho Theatre and a production of Hedwig and the Angry Inch at Heaven Nightclub with David Bedella.

== Later years ==
In March, 2010, in Coyoacán, Mexico City, he became the first European to marry a Mexican national of the same gender.

Also in 2010, he directed Anton Chekhov's The Cherry Orchard and the European premiere of Paula Vogel's AIDS themed play The Long Christmas Ride Home at the LOST Theatre in London.

In 2012, he directed the first production of The Vagina Monologues by Eve Ensler in Mexico.

In recent years, he directed The Irish Curse by Martin Casella at the Edinburgh Festival prior to a transfer to Dublin, Ireland and a new play in London, The Baby Box by Chris Leicester.

He also directed Oscar Wilde's An Ideal Husband and Noël Coward's Blithe Spirit in London.

Henry is Founder/Artistic Director for The Theatre 28 Ensemble and a member of the Directors Guild of Great Britain. He is also an associate member teacher at the London Academy of Music and Dramatic Art and an International Education leader often working in Latin America, the Middle East and Southeast Asia.
