= The Lisbon Traviata =

1989 play by Terrence McNally

The Lisbon Traviata is a 1989 American play by Terrence McNally premiered Off-Broadway. It revolves around several opera fans, especially of the opera singer Maria Callas, and their gay relationships.

== Overview ==
The play focuses on two of the playwright's favorite subjects, gay relationships and Maria Callas. The play has one of his most memorable characters, flamboyantly bitchy and viciously wicked opera queen Mendy. Peter Marks describes him: "...eccentric Mendy, who presides over the first act's delicious envelopment in opera trivia as if he himself had been trapped in a perpetual production of 'Tosca.'"

Stephen, a depressed literary editor and opera fanatic, is on the verge of losing his doctor lover to a considerably younger Columbia University student. In Act I, he takes temporary refuge at the apartment of fellow opera aficionado Mendy to dish about divas, listen to records, and avoid thinking about his rapidly unravelling eight-year relationship. In Act II, he returns home to confront his unfaithful partner.

The play derives its title from an actual 1958 Callas production of La traviata at Teatro Nacional de São Carlos in the Portuguese capital. Two thousand copies of an unauthorized recording made by a cast member during a live performance, despite their amateur quality, quickly became collector's items among the diva's fans. Stephen recently has acquired one which he neglected to bring with him, and Mendy is obsessed with his going home to retrieve it.

== Production history ==
An earlier version of the play was produced at the Theatre Off Park, New York City, by Sherwin M. Goldman, Westport Productions and Theatre Off Park, Inc. on June 4, 1985. Directed by John Tillinger, the cast included Seth Allen as Mendy, Benjamin Hendrickson as Stephen, Steven Culp as Paul and Stephen Schnetzer as Mike.

The play opened Off-Broadway at Stage I of the Manhattan Theatre Club on May 23, 1989, where it ran until July 2, 1989. The production transferred to the Promenade Theatre on October 31, 1989, with a new, nonviolent ending, where it ran until January 28, 1990. Directed by John Tillinger, the cast included Nathan Lane (as Mendy), Dan Butler (as Mike), Anthony Heald (as Stephen) and John Slattery (as Paul). Lane received rave reviews and won the Lucille Lortel and 1990 Drama Desk Awards for Best Actor. Tillinger won the Lucille Lortel Award for direction, and McNally was nominated for the Drama Desk Award for Outstanding New Play. Lighting design by Ken Billington.

A revised version was produced at the Marines Memorial Theatre, San Francisco and then moved to the Mark Taper Forum, Los Angeles, California in November 1990. Directed by John Tillinger, the cast featured Richard Thomas as Stephen, Nathan Lane as Mendy, Dan Butler as Mike and Sean O'Bryan as Paul. Nathan Lane explained that McNally "had softened the ending of 'The Lisbon Traviata' during its off-Broadway run. Mike Nichols and others had told him the original brutal ending was too much to handle, so he changed it. When we came to San Francisco, he returned to the original ending. That's the one you see here."

A 2003 British production, directed by Stephen Henry and starring Marcus D'Amico (Stephen), David Bamber (Mendy), Tristan Gemmill (Michael) and Matthew Thrift (Paul) played at The King's Head Theatre in London, and won the 2004 Best Overall Fringe Production Award from Whatsonstage.

== Critical reception ==
Toby Silverman Zinman wrote that The Lisbon Traviata was important in McNally's progress to becoming a "mature and contemplative theatrical voice", noting that the characters were more "fully developed" with complicated relationships.

Philip Fisher, in his review of the 2003 London production for British Theatre Guide, stated that the play was "extremely funny but also heart rending".

Peter Marks reviewed a 2010 production at the Kennedy Center for The Washington Post, calling the play "one of McNally's more daring plays and one of his best". Marks noted that "few writers are funnier."

Wayne Koestenbaum writes about The Lisbon Traviata in his book The Queen's Throat: Opera, Homosexuality, and the Mystery of Desire (1993), as does David Román in Acts of Intervention: Performance, Gay Culture, and AIDS (1998). Theatre scholar Jordan Schildcrout examines the critical response to different versions of the play and comments on the significance of "operatic violence" in his book Murder Most Queer: The Homicidal Homosexual in the American Theater (2014).
