= Wayne Koestenbaum =

American poet and cultural critic (born 1958)

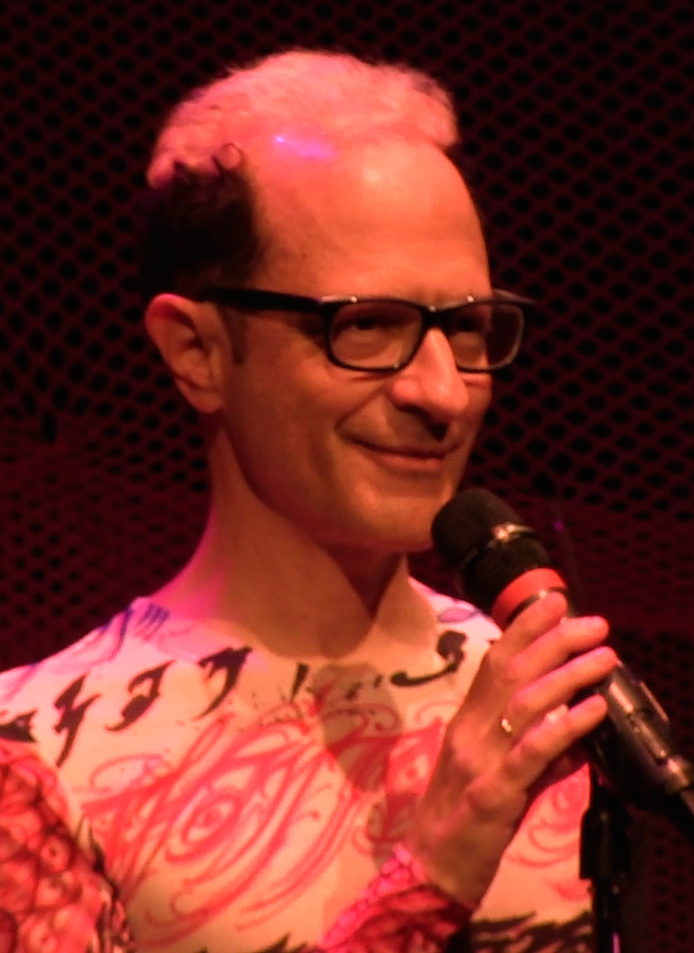
Wayne Koestenbaum performing at The Kitchen in New York City

Wayne Koestenbaum (born 1958) is an American artist, poet, and cultural critic. He received an American Academy of Arts and Letters Award in Literature in 2020. He has published over 20 books to date.

Koestenbaum works as a Distinguished Professor of English, French, and Comparative Literature at the CUNY Graduate Center, where he teaches poetry, and teaches painting at Yale University. He lives and works in New York City.

== Early life and education ==
Koestenbaum was born and raised in San Jose, California. He is the son of writer Phyllis Koestenbaum and leadership consultant Peter Koestenbaum. He received a B.A. from Harvard University, an M.A. from the Johns Hopkins Writing Seminars, and a Ph.D. from Princeton University and is a 1994 Whiting Award recipient.

Koestenbaum lived in New York from 1984 to 1988 while a graduate student at Princeton University. He notes that his early years in New York as the period when he discovered opera, literature, and gay culture. Koestenbaum wrote book reviews for the New York Native and the Village Voice during these years.

== Critical work ==
In Boston Review, Stefania Heim wrote that Koestenbaum's work —across genre— "obliterates any vestigial divide we might hold on to between play and thought. It revels in and broadcasts the risks and joys ( the risky joys and joyful risks) inherent in both." His best-known critical book, The Queen's Throat, is an exploration of the predilection of gay men for opera. Koestenbaum's conclusion is that gay men's affinity for opera tells us as much about opera and its inherent questions about masculinity as it does about homosexuality.

Humiliation, Koestenbaum's book on the meaning of humiliation (both personal and universal), was reviewed by John Waters as "the funniest, smartest, most heartbreaking yet powerful book I've read in a long time." Koestenbaum starred in a web series in support of this book, "Dear Wayne, I've Been Humiliated...", which was dubbed "the mother of all book trailers" by The New York Observer.

Koestenbaum's 2012 book The Anatomy of Harpo Marx was met with mixed reviews. Brian Dillon praised the book in Sight and Sound as "charming and rigorous" and lauded the book in Frieze as an "excellent example of a kind of delirious scholarship." Writing in the San Francisco Chronicle, Saul Austerlitz suggested that Koestenbaum "sexualizes Harpo beyond all recognition, creating a figure about whom the author can say, in all seriousness, that 'courtesy of the anus, we can imagine, Marxist-style, a path away from family and state.'" Joe Queenan wrote that Koestenbaum "peppers his story with just enough tidbits of fascinating information that readers may fleetingly overlook the fact that his theories are barmy."

Koestenbaum has published essays on celebrity, classical music, contemporary art, literature, and aesthetics; some of these essays have been collected in the books, Cleavage: Essays on Sex, Stars, and Aesthetics, and My 1980s & Other Essays, and Figure It Out: Essays. In 2021, Koestenbaum published his first collection of fables under Semiotext(e) titled, The Cheerful Scapegoat: Fables.

== Poetry ==
Koestenbaum's first book, Ode to Anna Moffo and Other Poems, was composed largely in syllabic verse and other fixed forms. In a review of Ode to Anna Moffo and Other Poems for Poetry Magazine, David Baker wrote that "[Koestenbaum] is... willing to exert the pressures of traditional formality, yet he is also likely to let the voice and experience of a poem grate against his own formal gestures..." He returned to fixed forms for his book-length poem, Model Homes, which is composed in ottava rima. His two most recent books, The Pink Trance Notebooks and Camp Marmalade, are experiments in what Koestenbaum refers to as trance writing. Ben Shields described trance writing in The Paris Review as an approach that "allows language to move freely" and "does not often adhere to expected thematic, syntactic, or logical patterns." Publishers Weekly described the work in The Pink Trance Notebooks as "look[ing] and feel[ing] like the cut-and-paste fragments of a journal."

== Other work ==
Koestenbaum began to paint in 2005 after he finished writing an essay for a group exhibition called "Contemporary Erotic Drawing" at the Aldrich Museum. He has had solo exhibitions at White Columns, the Art Museum at the University of Kentucky in Lexington, and 356 Mission. In a 2016 Art News article, Ella Coon wrote that "his early work was figurative, and influenced by Warhol. He used a monoprint technique to trace images of male nudes, which he'd originally drawn from life, onto a black ground."

Koestenbaum's first piano and vocal record, Lounge Act, was released in 2017 by Ugly Duckling Presse Records. He has performed at The Kitchen, REDCAT, Centre Pompidou, and The Walker Art Center.

== Awards ==
- 2023 Guggenheim Fellowship
- 2020 American Academy of Arts and Letters Award in Literature
- 1994 Whiting Award
- 1989 Co-winner of Discovery/The Nation Poetry Award

== Bibliography ==
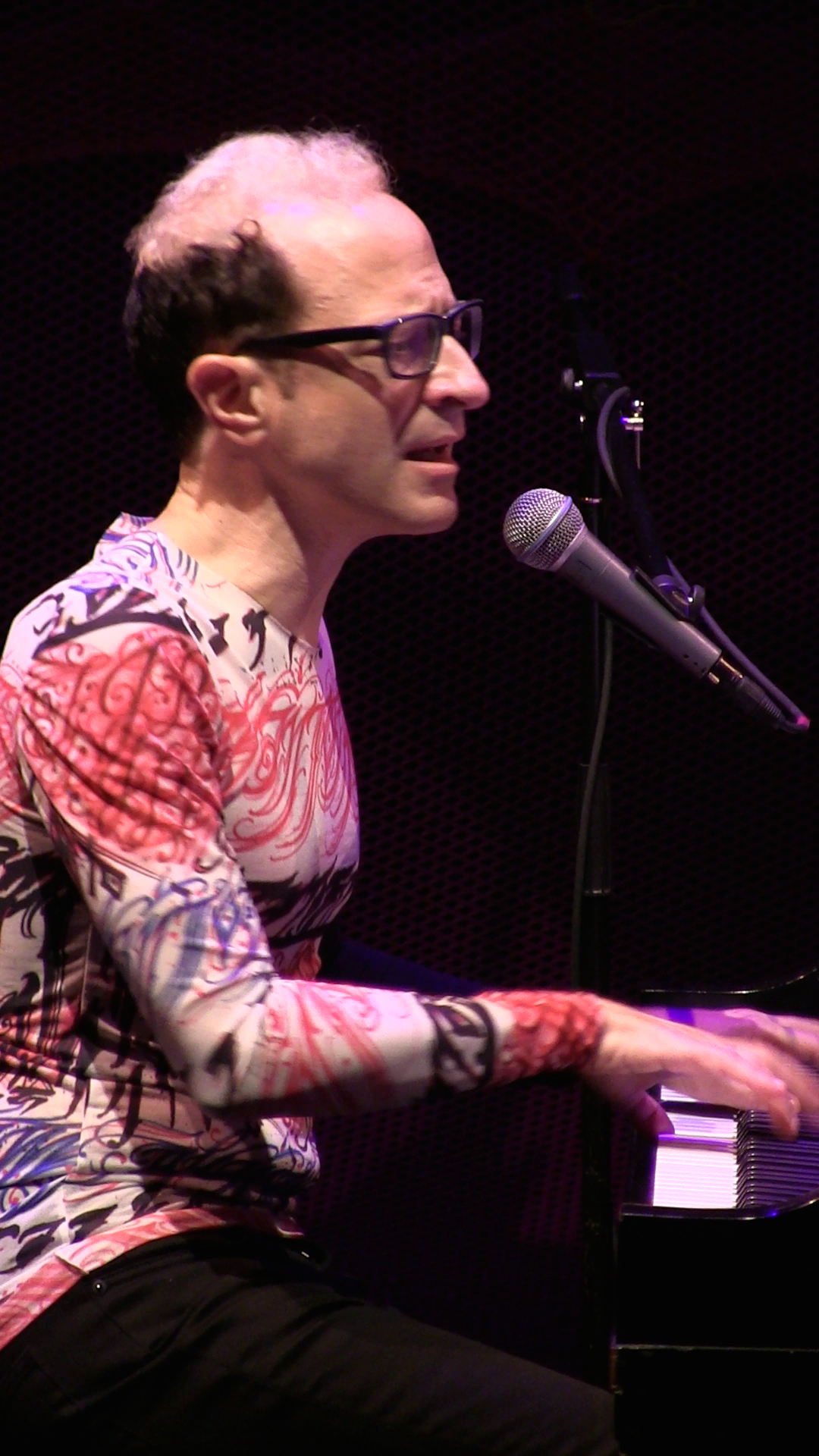
Wayne Koestenbaum performing at The Kitchen in New York City

=== Poetry ===
- Ode to Anna Moffo and Other Poems (Persea, 1990).
- Rhapsodies of A Repeat Offender (Persea, 1994).
- The Milk of Inquiry (Persea, 1999).
- Model Homes (BOA Editions, 2004).
- Best-Selling Jewish Porn Films (Turtle Point Press, 2006).
- Blue Stranger With Mosaic Background (Turtle Point Press, 2012).
- The Pink Trance Notebooks (Nightboat Books, 2015).
- Camp Marmalade (Nightboat Books, 2018).
- Ultramarine (Nightboat Books, 2022).

=== Criticism ===
- Double Talk: The Erotics of Male Literary Collaboration (Routledge, 1989).
- The Queen's Throat: Opera, Homosexuality, and the Mystery of Desire (Poseidon, 1993).
- Jackie Under My Skin: Interpreting An Icon (Farrar, Straus, and Giroux, 1995).
- Cleavage: Essays on Sex, Stars, and Aesthetics (Ballantine Books, 2000).
- Andy Warhol (Lipper/Viking, 2001).
- Humiliation (Picador, 2011).
- The Anatomy of Harpo Marx (University of California Press, 2012).
- My 1980s and Other Essays (Farrar, Straus, and Giroux, 2013)
- Notes on Glaze: 18 Photographic Investigations (New York: Cabinet Books, 2016). ISBN 9781932698589, 1932698582
- Figure It Out, Essays (Soft Skull Press, 2020).

=== Fiction ===
- Hotel Theory (Soft Skull Press, 2007).
- Moira Orfei in Aigues-Mortes (Soft Skull Press, 2004; reprinted as Circus, Soft Skull, 2019).
- The Cheerful Scapegoat: Fables (Semiotext(e), 2021).
- My Lover, the Rabbi (Farrar, Straus, and Giroux, 2026).

=== Opera libretto ===
- Jackie O

=== Lyric essay ===
- (The Task of the Translator, Fall 2003)
