= The Queen's Throat =

1993 book by Wayne Koestenbaum

- Author: Wayne Koestenbaum
- Language: English
- Subject: Opera, gay men
- Published: 1993
- Publisher: Da Capo Press
- Publication place: United States
- Media type: Print
- ISBN: 978-0306810084

The Queen's Throat: Opera, Homosexuality, and the Mystery of Desire is a 1993 book by Wayne Koestenbaum with an introduction by Tony Kushner. It was published in German in 1996 with the title Königin der Nacht – Oper, Homosexualität und Begehren [Queen of the Night – Opera, Homosexuality and Desire]

== Summary ==
Koestenbaum explores the relationship between gay men and opera, with frequent reference to his own experiences. In particular, he finds a strong identification of the "opera queen" with the "diva". His connection between the two is the voice: he describes it as genderless, and it allows female singers to become vicarious surrogates for closeted or fearful male listeners, and proves that the body of the opera singer and the queer body are both restrained.
