= Marcus D'Amico =

British actor

- Born: 4 December 1965; Frankfurt, Hesse, West Germany
- Died: 16 December 2020 (aged 55); Oxfordshire, England
- Occupation: Actor
- Children: 2

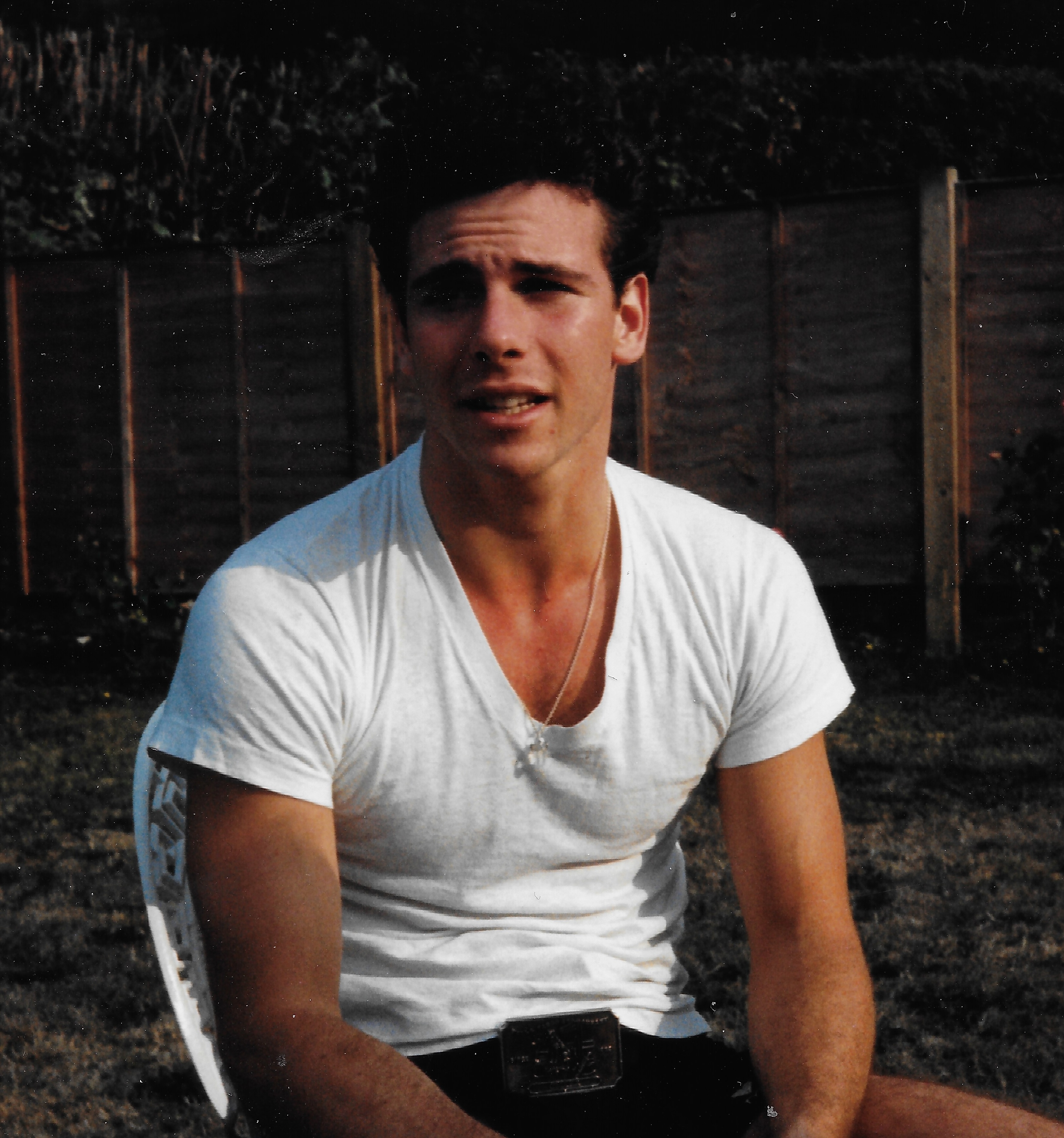
Marcus D'Amico, UK, 1990s

Marcus D'Amico (4 December 1965 – 16 December 2020) was a film, television, and stage actor known for his role as Michael "Mouse" Tolliver in the 1993 Tales of the City miniseries.

Born in Germany to an American father and a British mother, D'Amico was raised in the United Kingdom, attending Reading Blue Coat School and Redroofs Theatre School.

== Acting career ==
Early in his career, D'Amico had brief roles in Superman II (1980) and Stanley Kubrick's Full Metal Jacket (1987). He guest-starred in Jeeves & Wooster (1993), As Time Goes By (1994), and the black comedy Murder Most Horrid (1996). Other appearances included UK police drama The Bill (2002), also had a recurring role in the UK soap opera Family Affairs (2005).

D'Amico had stated a preference for stage acting, and among his various stage performances were a production of Shakespeare's Julius Caesar at London's Young Vic Theatre, and The Boys Next Door at London's Comedy Theatre. He was nominated for the 1992 Laurence Olivier Award for Best Actor for his portrayal of Louis in Angels in America.

In 2003, he appeared in The Lisbon Traviata at the King's Head Theatre in London. The following year he joined the cast of Mamma Mia! in London.

=== Tales of the City ===
Despite the success of his performance as Michael "Mouse" Tolliver in Tales of the City, D'Amico did not appear in the 1998 sequel More Tales of the City. (The role was recast with Paul Hopkins, who went on to appear in Further Tales of the City in 2001.) According to author Armistead Maupin:

Despite the rumors, it is not true that Marcus D'Amico wasn't invited back because of issues surrounding his sexuality. The production team met Marcus and he expressed "ambivalence" about returning to the role of Mouse. The director felt it was important to find someone who would enthusiastically embrace the role.

D'Amico himself had referred to his past work on the Tales of the City miniseries as "Exhausting, enlightening and challenging."

When asked about fears of typecasting after appearing in the Angels in America stage play and the Tales of the City TV series, D'Amico stated in 2003, "I did get typecast in gay roles but it now no longer worries me."

== Death ==
On 16 December 2020, D'Amico died of pneumonia at his home in Oxfordshire, England, aged 55.

== Filmography ==
=== Film ===
Year	Title	Role	Notes
1980	Superman II	Willie	
1987	Full Metal Jacket	Hand Job	
1989	The Long Weekend (O' Despair)	Greg	
2010	Tears	Sam	Short
2010	An Act of Valour	D.I. Russell	Short

=== Television ===
Year	Title	Role	Notes
1980	The Square Leopard	Bill	6 Episodes
1980	To Serve Them All My Days	Boy	Episode: "Part Five"
1980	The Professionals	Daniel	Episode: "Weekend in the Country"
1981	BBC2 Playhouse	Col Marriott	Episode: "Last Summer's Child"
1982	S.W.A.L.K.	Gary	3 Episodes
1984	Scene	Andrew Davies	Episode: "Just Deserts"
1986	Screen Two	Wayne Kennedy	Episode: "The Silent Twins"
1990	Boon	Peter Sorreno	Episode: "A Night at the Ballet"
1991	Drop the Dead Donkey	Scott	Episode: "Baseball"
1991–1992	Trainer	David Ware	15 Episodes
1993	Jeeves and Wooster	Lucius Pim	Episode: "Return to New York"
1993	Tales of the City	Michael "Mouse" Tolliver	6 Episodes
1994	In Suspicious Circumstances	Al Capone	Episode: "No Witness, No Case"
1994	As Time Goes By	Cy Lieberman	Episode: "A Trip to Los Angeles"
1996	Murder Most Horrid	Raul Manendez	Episode: "Dying Live"
2002	The Bill	James Chandler	4 Episodes
2003	Seven Wonders of the Industrial World	Grenville Dodge	Episode: "Transcontinental Railway"
2005	Family Affairs	Max Lawson	3 Episodes
2018	The Alienist: Angel of Darkness	Charlie Delmonico	Episode: "A Fruitful Partnership"
