= Nathan Lane =

American actor (born 1956)

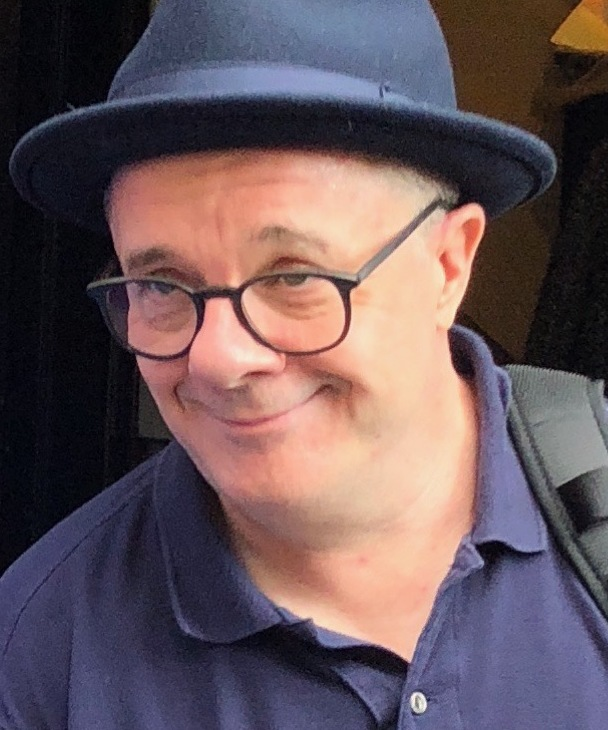
- Lane after Angels in America (2018)
- Born: Joseph Lane; February 3, 1956 (age 70); Jersey City, New Jersey, U.S.
- Occupation: Actor
- Years active: 1977–present
- Works: Full list
- Spouse: Devlin Elliott (m. 2015)
- Awards: Full list

Nathan Lane (born Joseph Lane; February 3, 1956) is an American actor. Known for his versatile roles on stage and screen, he has received numerous accolades including three Tony Awards, seven Drama Desk Awards, a Laurence Olivier Award, three Emmy Awards, and a Screen Actors Guild Actor Award. Lane was awarded a star on the Hollywood Walk of Fame in 2006 and was inducted into the American Theater Hall of Fame in 2008. In 2010, The New York Times hailed Lane as being "the greatest stage entertainer of the decade".

Lane made his professional theatre debut in 1978 in an off-Broadway production of A Midsummer Night's Dream. During that time he also briefly appeared as one half of the comedy team of Stack and Lane, until he was cast in the 1982 Broadway revival of Noël Coward's Present Laughter directed by and starring George C. Scott. That led to an extensive career onstage, where he had a long friendship and fruitful collaboration with the playwright Terrence McNally which started in 1989 with the Manhattan Theater Club production of The Lisbon Traviata.

He has won three Tony Awards: for Best Actor in a Musical for Pseudolus in Stephen Sondheim's A Funny Thing Happened on the Way to the Forum (1996) and Max Bialystock in Mel Brooks' The Producers (2001), and Best Featured Actor in a Play for Roy Cohn in Tony Kushner's Angels in America (2018). He was also Tony-nominated for Guys and Dolls (1992), The Nance (2013), The Front Page (2016), and Death of a Salesman (2026). Among his 25 Broadway credits are The Man Who Came To Dinner (2000), The Frogs (2004), The Odd Couple (2005), Butley (2006), November (2008), Waiting for Godot (2009), The Addams Family (2010), It's Only a Play (2014), Gary: A Sequel to Titus Andronicus (2019), and Pictures from Home (2023).

Lane has acted in films such as The Lion King (1994), The Birdcage (1996), Mouse Hunt (1997), The Producers (2005), and Beau Is Afraid (2023). He received the Primetime Emmy Award for his role in the Hulu series Only Murders in the Building in 2022. He has received eight Emmy nominations for his guest roles in Frasier, Mad About You, Modern Family, The Good Wife and Only Murders. He has also received two Daytime Emmy Awards as well. He portrayed F. Lee Bailey in the FX miniseries The People v. O. J. Simpson: American Crime Story (2016) and Dominick Dunne in the Netflix anthology series Monsters: The Lyle and Erik Menendez Story (2024). He has also starred in Penny Dreadful: City of Angels (2020), The Gilded Age (2022–2025), and Mid-Century Modern (2025).

== Early life and education ==
Lane was born Joseph Lane in Jersey City, New Jersey on February 3, 1956. His father Daniel Joseph Lane was a truck driver and an aspiring tenor who died in 1967 from alcoholism when Nathan was 11. His mother Nora Veronica (née Finnerty) was a housewife and secretary who suffered from bipolar disorder and died in 2000. Nathan has two older brothers, Daniel Jr, a teacher, and Robert. Their parents were Catholics and all of their grandparents were Irish immigrants. He was named Joseph after his uncle, a Jesuit priest. Nathan attended Catholic schools in Jersey City, including Jesuit-run St. Peter's Preparatory School, where he was voted Best Actor in 1974, and in 2011 received the Prep Hall of Fame Professional Achievement Award.

== Career ==
=== 1975–1990s: Rise to prominence ===
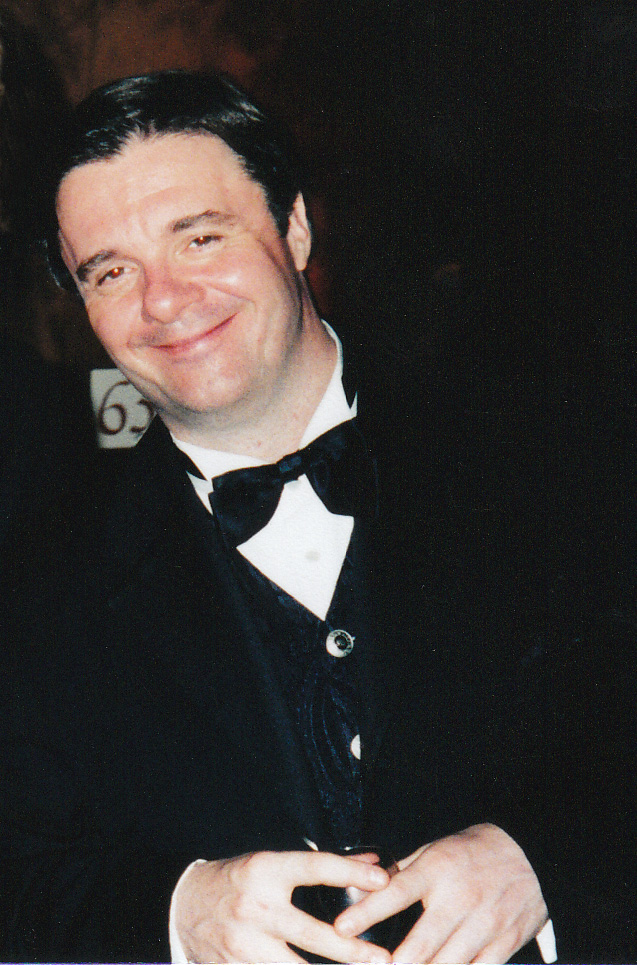
Lane in Los Angeles at the 1998 Primetime Emmy Awards, September 1998

Accepted to Saint Joseph's University in Philadelphia on a drama scholarship, Joseph Lane was accompanied on what was supposed to be his first day there by his older brother Dan. Discovering that the scholarship would not cover enough of his expenses, he decided to leave, and work for a year to earn some money. His brother said, "I remember him saying to me, 'College is for people who don't know what they want to do.'"

Because there already was a Joseph Lane registered with Actors' Equity, he changed his name to Nathan after the character Nathan Detroit from the musical Guys and Dolls. He moved to New York City in 1975 where after a long struggle, his career began to take off, first with some brief success in the world of stand-up comedy with partner Patrick Stack and later with off-Broadway productions at Second Stage Theatre, the Roundabout Theatre, and the Manhattan Theatre Club. In 1978, he appeared in a production of A Midsummer Night's Dream alongside John Goodman at the Equity Library Theatre. He made his Broadway debut in a 1982 revival of Noël Coward's Present Laughter as Roland Maule (Drama Desk nomination) with George C. Scott, Kate Burton, Dana Ivey, Bette Henritze, Elizabeth Hubbard, Jim Piddock, and Christine Lahti.

His second Broadway appearance was in the 1983 musical Merlin, starring Chita Rivera and magician Doug Henning. This was followed by Wind in the Willows as Mr. Toad, Some Americans Abroad at Lincoln Center, and the national tour of Neil Simon's Broadway Bound.

Off-Broadway productions in which he appeared, include Love (the musical version of Murray Schisgal's Luv), Measure for Measure directed by Joseph Papp in Central Park, for which he received the St. Clair Bayfield Award, The Common Pursuit, The Film Society, In a Pig's Valise, She Stoops to Conquer, The Merry Wives of Windsor and A Midsummer Night's Dream. He appeared at the Williamstown Theatre Festival in The School for Scandal and John Guare's Moon Over Miami. His association with Stephen Sondheim began in 1989 with a workshop reading of Assassins, where he played Samuel Byck, the would-be murderer of Richard Nixon. Lane also appeared in the television shows Miami Vice and The Days and Nights of Molly Dodd as Bing Shalimar.

Lane had a long friendship with Terrence McNally

In 1991, Lane appeared with George C. Scott again in a revival of Paul Osborne's On Borrowed Time at the Circle in the Square Theatre on Broadway. In 1992, he starred in the hit revival of Guys and Dolls, playing Nathan Detroit, the character who lent him his name, opposite Peter Gallagher and Faith Prince. For this performance, he received his first Tony nomination, as well as Drama Desk and Outer Critics Circle Awards. In 1992, he won an Obie Award for Sustained Excellence of Performance. His professional association with his close friend the playwright Terrence McNally, whom he met in 1987, includes roles in The Lisbon Traviata (Drama Desk and Lucille Lortel Awards, and Outer Critics Circle nomination), Bad Habits, Lips Together, Teeth Apart, Love! Valour! Compassion! (Obie, Drama Desk, and Outer Critics Circle Awards), Dedication or the Stuff of Dreams, which opened in 2005 (Drama Desk nomination), The Last Mile on PBS' Great Performances, and the film version of Frankie and Johnny.

The early 1990s began a stretch of successful Broadway shows for Lane. In 1993, he portrayed Sid Caesar-like Max Prince in Neil Simon's Laughter on the 23rd Floor, inspired by Simon's early career writing sketches for Your Show of Shows. In 1996, he starred in the hit revival of Stephen Sondheim's A Funny Thing Happened on the Way to the Forum. For his performance he won the Tony Award for Best Actor in a Musical as well as the Drama Desk and Outer Critics Circle Awards. In 1998, he appeared off Broadway in Jon Robin Baitz's revised 1984 comedy, Mizlansky/Zilinsky or 'Schmucks'.

=== 1994–2009: Breakthrough and acclaim ===
In 1994, Lane voiced Timon, the meerkat, in Disney's animated films The Lion King, The Lion King II: Simba's Pride and The Lion King 1½. In 1995, Lane was the voice of the meerkat in the early episodes of Timon & Pumbaa. In 1995, he played the Cowardly Lion in The Wizard of Oz in Concert at Lincoln Center to benefit the Children's Defense Fund. The performance was originally broadcast on Turner Network Television (TNT).

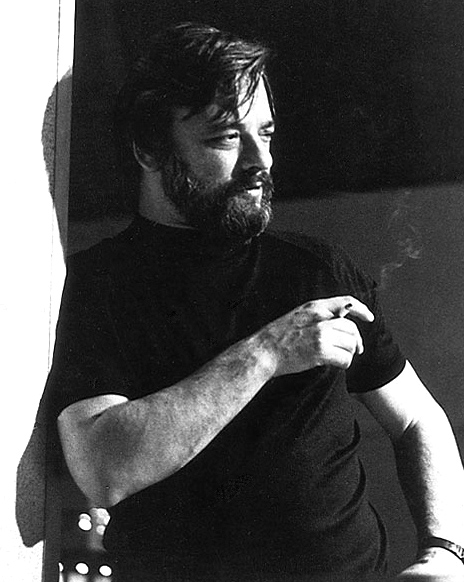
Lane collaborated with Stephen Sondheim in several of his projects

In 1996 Lane appeared in the film The Birdcage, for which he received his first Golden Globe nomination. The film, an American remake of the classic French farce La Cage aux Folles, was directed by Mike Nichols with a screenplay by Elaine May, and starred Robin Williams, Lane, and Gene Hackman, and went on to be a big success. The Stephen Sondheim song "Little Dream" in The Birdcage was written especially for him. In 1999, he appeared with Victor Garber in the workshop of the Sondheim musical Wise Guys (later retitled Road Show). His collaboration with Sondheim would continue when Lane revised the original book for and starred in the Broadway debut of the composer's The Frogs at Lincoln Center in 2004.

Lane appeared in the 1997 dark comedy Mouse Hunt, one of the first films to come out of the newly formed DreamWorks Studios, in which he co-starred with British comedian Lee Evans and Christopher Walken. In 1999, he appeared in the Encores! concert revival of Do Re Mi at City Center. That same year he also voiced the role of Snowbell in the family film Stuart Little, opposite his Life With Mikey co-star Michael J. Fox.

He is known for his voice work in two Disney animated series, Teacher's Pet and Timon & Pumbaa, as well as George and Martha on HBO. He received Daytime Emmy Awards for his voice performances in Teacher's Pet and Timon & Pumbaa, as well as a nomination for George and Martha. He hosted Saturday Night Live in 1997, and the Tony Awards (once as host for the 50th anniversary telecast, and three times as co-host, with Glenn Close and Gregory Hines; Rosie O'Donnell; and Matthew Broderick respectively). From 1998 to 1999 he starred in the NBC sitcom Encore! Encore! alongside Joan Plowright and Glenne Headly. The New York Times gave a very positive review to the show's debut, writing it possessed the "most accomplished, high-powered cast on television." Although the series got positive reviews it was canceled. He still won the People's Choice Award that year for Favorite New Actor in a Comedy. Lane received Emmy Award nominations for his guest appearances on Frasier and Mad About You in 1995 and 1998, respectively.

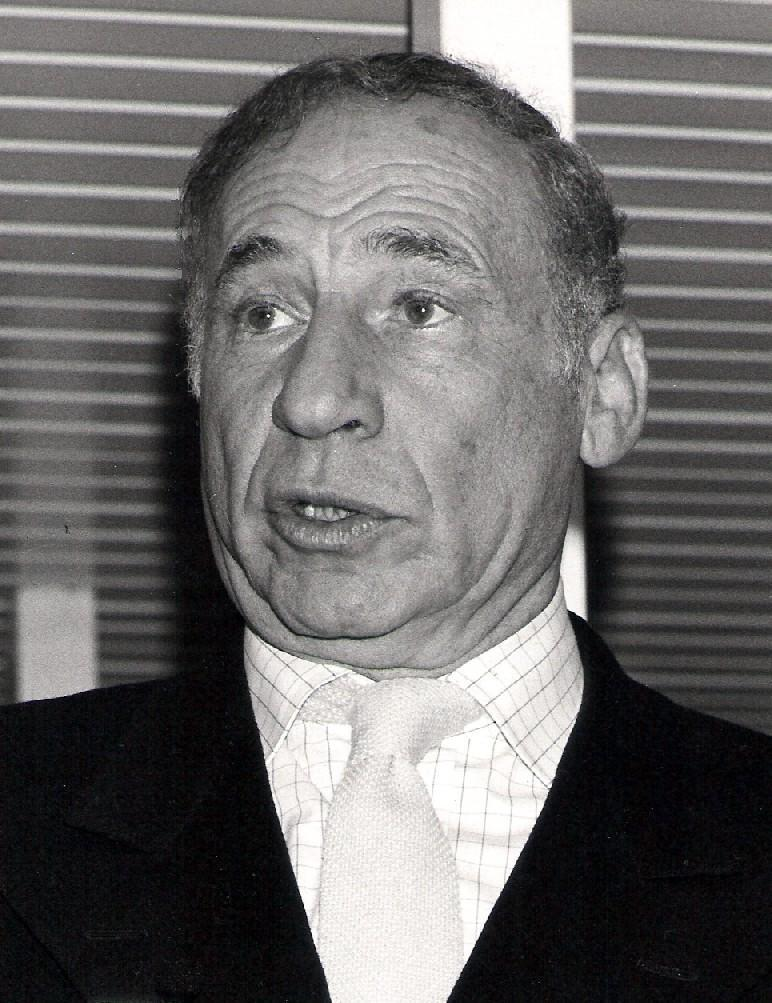
Lane starred in Mel Brooks' The Producers (2001)

Lane starred in the Roundabout revival of The Man Who Came to Dinner as Sheridan Whiteside, with Jean Smart and Harriet Sansom Harris in 2000. Charles Isherwood of Variety liked his performance, "Nathan Lane, an actor who makes virtually every role he plays seem like a role he was born to play, is the splendidly seething, delightfully acerbic center of Jerry Zaks' splashy production of the 1939 comedy". The production was taped and shown on PBS. That same year he starred in Kenneth Branagh's film adaptation of William Shakespeare's Love's Labour's Lost (2000). He acted in the comedy Isn't She Great (2000) opposite Bette Midler, the crime drama Trixie (2000), and voiced a character in the animated science fiction film Titan A.E. (2000).

In 2001, he starred as Max Bialystock in the blockbuster musical version of Mel Brooks's The Producers. He acted alongside Matthew Broderick. Chris Jones of Variety wrote "Lane's greatest contribution, though, is this performer's innate sense of pace. He's constantly propelling the show forward and giving all this nonsense a necessary sense of urgency." Ben Brantley of The New York Times praised Lane's performance describing it as his "most delicious performance". He complimented Lane's and Broderick's chemistry adding "Mr. Lane and Mr. Broderick, have the most dynamic stage chemistry since Natasha Richardson met Liam Neeson in Anna Christie. The role earned him his second Tony Award for Best Actor in a Musical as well as Drama Desk and Outer Critics Circle Awards.

The next year he reprised his role as Snowbell in Stuart Little 2 (2002). He then appeared as Vincent Crummles in a film adaptation of Nicholas Nickleby (2002) and the cast received the Ensemble Acting award from the National Board of Review. In 2003, he starred off Broadway in Trumbo: Red, White, and Blacklisted. In 2004, Lane revised the libretto and portrayed Dionysus in the revival of Stephen Sondheim's musical The Frogs which opened at the Vivian Beaumont Theater at Lincoln Center on Broadway. That same year he replaced Richard Dreyfuss in The Producers in the West End. Dreyfuss was let go just a week before the show's first preview at London's Theatre Royal Drury Lane. Lane went on to win the Olivier Award as Best Actor in a Musical. His performance in the film version, opposite Broadway co-star Matthew Broderick as Leo Bloom, earned him his second nomination for the Golden Globe Award for Best Actor – Motion Picture Musical or Comedy.

In 2005, Lane rejoined Broderick for a successful limited run of The Odd Couple. In 2006, he took on a primarily dramatic role in a revival of Simon Gray's dark comedy Butley, having played the role to great success at The Huntington Theater Company in Boston in 2003. He and Broderick received adjacent stars on the Hollywood Walk of Fame in a joint ceremony on January 9, 2006, and were immortalized in wax as Max and Leo at Madame Tussauds Museum in New York City on January 16, 2009. In 2008, he played the President of the United States in the David Mamet political satire, November, directed by Joe Mantello. This was followed by the critically acclaimed 2009 revival of Waiting for Godot (Outer Critics Circle nomination) in which he played Estragon opposite Bill Irwin's Vladimir. He was a 2008 American Theatre Hall of Fame inductee. In the 2000s Lane also made guest appearances on Sex and the City, Curb Your Enthusiasm, Absolutely Fabulous, and 30 Rock.

=== 2010–2019: Established actor ===
In 2009, Lane starred in the musical version of The Addams Family as Gomez in Chicago, a role he reprised on Broadway the following year, receiving Drama Desk and Outer Critics Circle nominations. That year he also received a Drama League Award for Distinguished Achievement in Musical Theater. Committed to starring in a revival of the Eugene O'Neill play The Iceman Cometh at Chicago's Goodman Theatre in 2012, Lane assumed the role of Hickey, with Brian Dennehy playing the role of Larry Slade in a production directed by the Goodman's Artistic Director, Robert Falls. Receiving rave reviews, it won six Jeff Awards, including Best Ensemble, director, and Production, and is the most successful play to date in the theater's history.

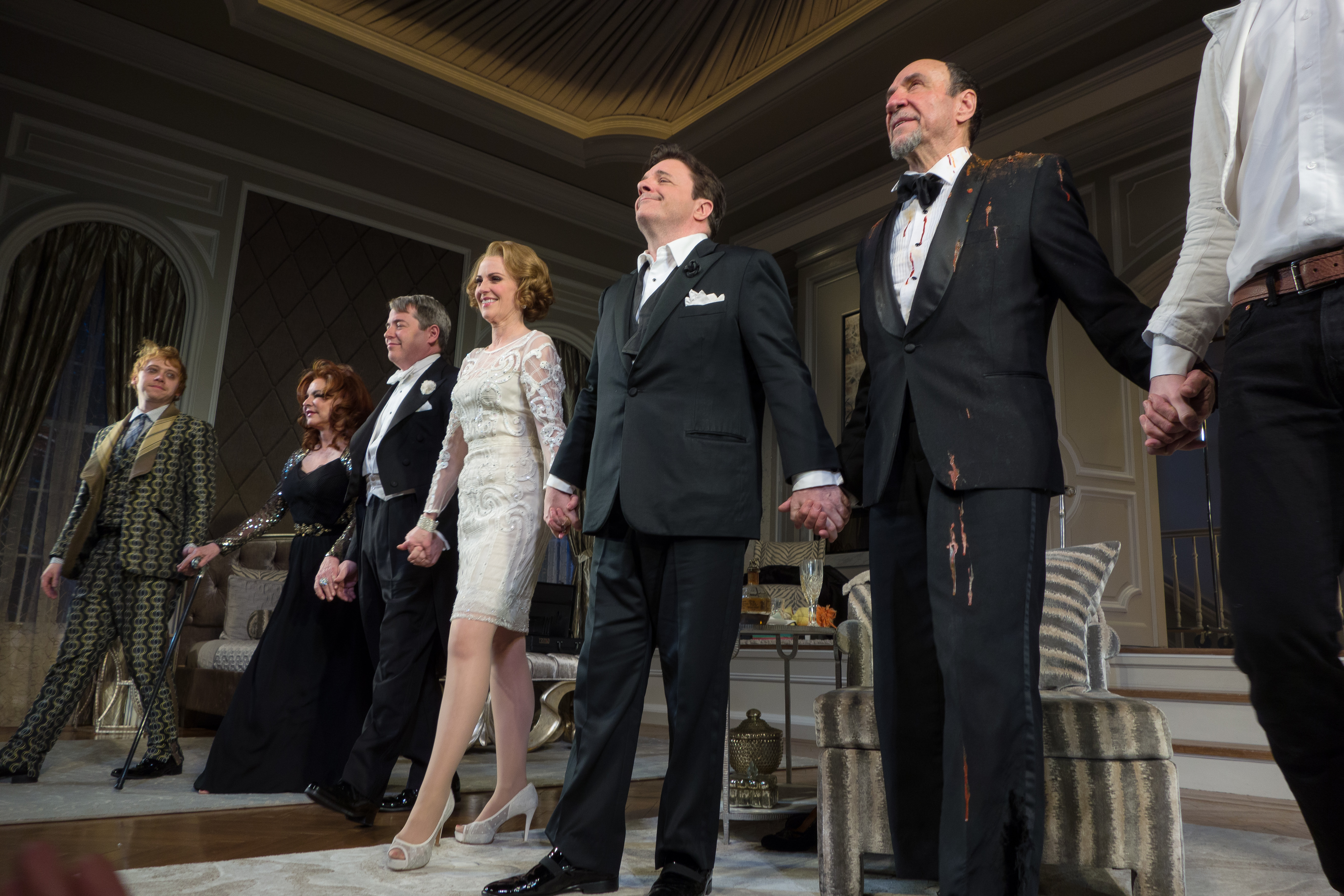
(L–R) Rupert Grint, Stockard Channing, Matthew Broderick, Megan Mullally, Lane, F. Murray Abraham, Micah Stock in It's Only a Play in 2014

From 2010 to 2019, Lane portrayed Pepper Saltzman in the ABC sitcom Modern Family for which he received three Primetime Emmy Award for Outstanding Guest Actor in a Comedy Series nominations. From 2012 to 2014 he played Clarke Hayden in the legal series The Good Wife receiving a nomination for the Primetime Emmy Award for Outstanding Guest Actor in a Drama Series. In the spring of 2013, Lane returned to Broadway in The Nance, a Lincoln Center production of a new play by Douglas Carter Beane that was directed by Jack O'Brien. David Rooney of The Hollywood Reporter praised his performance writing, "Lane is masterful, finding new depths in a well-worn sad clown persona" adding, "[The production] at the very least it provides a tremendous vehicle for Lane". He went on to receive Tony and Drama Desk Award nominations and won the Outer Critics Circle Award and the 2013 Drama League Award for Distinguished Performance. The play aired on PBS Live from Lincoln Center in 2014.

In autumn 2014, he appeared in an all-star ensemble of Terrence McNally's revised and updated It's Only a Play, with F. Murray Abraham, Matthew Broderick, Stockard Channing, Rupert Grint, Megan Mullally, and Micah Stock. The show became one of the biggest hits of the season. In February 2015 he reprised the role of Hickey in the Robert Falls production of The Iceman Cometh to great acclaim at the Brooklyn Academy of Music. New York Post film critic Elizabeth Vincentelli wrote of his performance, "Lane, one of his generation's most brilliant comic actors...[hits] the sweet spot between pretend perkiness and self-loathing". He later returned to the Broadway run of It's Only a Play. In 2015, he received the Eugene O'Neill Theater Center Monte Cristo Award for his body of work. In March 2016, he opened the play White Rabbit, Red Rabbit off Broadway.

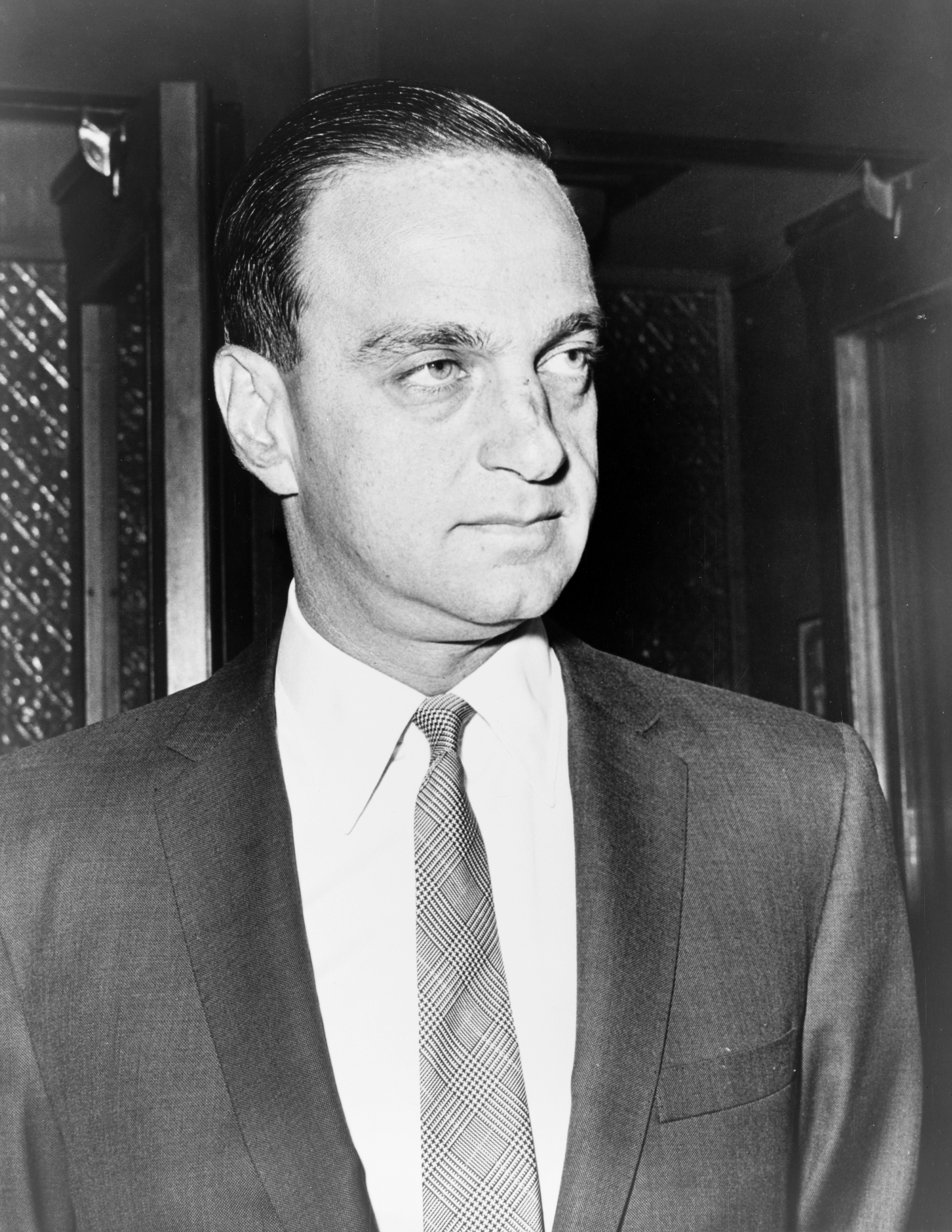
Lane portrayed Roy Cohn in the revival of Angels in America in 2018

Lane played F. Lee Bailey in The People v. O. J. Simpson: American Crime Story, the first season of American Crime Story, which premiered on the FX channel in February 2016. Daniel Feinberg of The Hollywood Reporter described his performance as "understatedly Machiavellian". Emily St. Jones of Vox declared Lane as "hugely enjoyable" in the series. It received 22 Emmy nominations and went on to win the Primetime Emmy Award for Outstanding Limited Series. In fall of 2016, he returned to Broadway to rave reviews in an all-star revival of Hecht and MacArthur's The Front Page, directed by Jack O'Brien and produced by Scott Rudin. He played the ruthless editor Walter Burns opposite John Slattery as Hildy Johnson and John Goodman as Sheriff Hartman, for which he received a nomination for the Tony Award for Best Featured Actor in a Play. He also received nominations for Drama Desk and Outer Critics Circle Awards. During this time he also guest starred on series such as Difficult People (2016) and The Blacklist (2018).

Next he played Roy Cohn with Andrew Garfield as Prior Walter in the revival of Angels in America, directed by Marianne Elliott at the Lyttlelton Theatre of the National Theatre of Great Britain. Lane reprised his acclaimed portrayal on Broadway at the Neil Simon Theatre, and won the Tony, Drama Desk, and Outer Critics Circle Awards for Best Featured Actor in a Play. In March 2019, Lane starred in Taylor Mac's absurdist black comedy Gary: A Sequel to Titus Andronicus at the Booth Theatre directed by George C. Wolfe. The play received seven Tony Award nominations, including Best Play.

=== 2020–present ===
Lane played the role of Lewis Michener on Showtime's Penny Dreadful: City of Angels which premiered April 26, 2020, and ran for one season. He had a recurring role in the Hulu series Only Murders in the Building, starring Steve Martin, Martin Short, and Selena Gomez, for which he received a Primetime Emmy Award for Outstanding Guest Actor in a Comedy Series. That was Lane's first Primetime Emmy Award after a record-breaking seven nominations in the guest actor categories, making him the most nominated Comedy Guest Actor in Emmy history, a record he still holds after receiving his eighth nomination in 2023 in the same category. He also played the recurring role of Ward McAllister in the HBO period series, The Gilded Age, written by Julian Fellowes, which received a 2024 Screen Actors Guild Award nomination for Outstanding Ensemble in a Drama Series and a 2024 Emmy nomination for Best Drama. In 2023, Lane returned to the Broadway stage, marking his 25th Broadway show, in Pictures from Home, a play adapted from the photo memoir by Larry Sultan. Lane portrayed the father and former razor blade salesman to his son a photographer, played by Danny Burstein, who's remembering his visits with his family. Lane's wife in the play was portrayed by Zoë Wanamaker. The production was directed by Bartlett Sher and was helmed at the Studio 54 theatre. The play received mixed reviews but praise for Lane's performance with Marilyn Stasio of Variety writing, "Lane and Burstein are consummate pros, and there are considerable sparks of familial communication between the father and son they play with such warmth and understanding."

Also in 2023, Lane co-starred in Ari Aster's new A24 film, Beau Is Afraid alongside Joaquin Phoenix, Amy Ryan, and Patti LuPone. Max Ceo of Esquire praised Aster for the casting of Lane writing, "There's a palpable sense that the director had seasoned character actors such as Nathan Lane in his mind while writing. He milks every dad-ish 'My dude' the script hands him".

He co-starred in another A24 film, Dicks: The Musical, directed by Larry Charles and written by Aaron Jackson and Josh Sharp, with the film based on their Upright Citizens Brigade musical stage show Fucking Identical Twins. Jackson and Sharp play the twins with Lane and Megan Mullally as the parents. It also features Bowen Yang and Megan Thee Stallion. The film premiered at the 2023 Toronto International Film Festival to positive reviews and won the Midnight Madness People's Choice Award. Kristy Puchko of Mashable wrote, "[Lane] who stole scenes earlier this year as a plucky papa in another A24 movie Beau is Afraid—gives his all, committing to bit after bit" adding "In a career of superb comedy, he's in top form here". He was part of the voice cast for Spellbound, a new animated film from Skydance for Netflix, with Rachel Zegler, Nicole Kidman, Javier Bardem, Jenifer Lewis and John Lithgow, as well as the Ryan Murphy miniseries, Monsters: The Lyle and Erik Menendez Story, as Dominick Dunne. He then starred in the new Hulu multi-cam comedy, Mid-Century Modern, created by Max Mutchnick and David Kohan of Will & Grace, directed by Jimmy Burrows, and also produced by Ryan Murphy, alongside Matt Bomer, Nathan Lee Graham, and Linda Lavin in her final role.

In 2026, he returned to the Broadway stage portraying Willy Loman in the critically acclaimed revival of the Arthur Miller play Death of a Salesman opposite Laurie Metcalf, Christopher Abbott, and Ben Ahlers. The production won six Tony awards, including Best Revival. Lane received Tony, Drama Desk, and Outer Critics Circle Award nominations, and won the Outer Critics Circle Award.

In March 2026, as part of his final appearance, Lane performed the song 'Laughing Matters' from the 1996 off-Broadway revue When Pigs Fly on The Late Show with Stephen Colbert, which had been canceled by CBS in July 2025. He was accompanied on piano by Marc Shaiman.

== Personal life ==
=== Identity and marriage ===
Lane says that when he told his mother at age 21 that he was gay, she said to him in dismay, "I'd rather you were dead." He replied, "I knew you'd understand." He joked that "once I got her head out of the oven, everything went fine." He came out publicly in 1999 after the killing of Matthew Shepard and has been a long-time board member of and fundraiser for Broadway Cares/Equity Fights AIDS. He has been honored with the Human Rights Campaign Equality Award, the Gay & Lesbian Alliance Against Defamation Vito Russo Award, The Trevor Project Hero Award, and in 2015 received the Matthew Shepard Foundation Making A Difference Award.

On November 17, 2015, he married writer Devlin Elliott, his partner of 18 years. They live in Manhattan and East Hampton, New York.

=== Political orientation ===
Lane has made various critical statements and jokes about Republican Party figures. He was an active supporter of Hillary Clinton and Barack Obama and has hosted fundraisers for the Democratic Party.

== Acting credits ==
Lane has had an extensive career in film, television, and in theater. He has appeared in such films as The Lion King (1994), The Birdcage (1996), Mouse Hunt (1997), Stuart Little (1999) and its sequel Stuart Little 2 (2002), and the film adaptation of the Broadway musical The Producers (2005). He is also known for numerous guest roles including Frasier, Mad About You, 30 Rock, Absolutely Fabulous, Curb Your Enthusiasm, The Blacklist and recurring roles on Modern Family and The Good Wife. He has received critical praise for his roles as F. Lee Bailey in the limited series The People v. O.J. Simpson (2016) and in the 2020 Showtime series Penny Dreadful: City of Angels as Det. Lewis Michener. His roles in theatre range from musical comedies, Guys and Dolls (1992), A Funny Thing Happened on the Way to the Forum (1996), The Producers (2001) and The Addams Family (2010) to dramatic roles in the work of Terrence McNally, Jon Robin Baitz, and Simon Gray as well as revivals and new plays such as The Odd Couple (2005), November (2008), Waiting for Godot (2009), The Nance (2013), It's Only a Play (2015), The Iceman Cometh (2015), The Front Page (2016), Angels in America (2018), Gary: A Sequel to Titus Andronicus (2019), Pictures From Home (2023), and Death of a Salesman (2026).

== Awards and honors ==
Lane has received seven Tony Award nominations for his work on Broadway, winning three times for A Funny Thing Happened on the Way to the Forum (1996), The Producers (2001), and Angels in America (2018). Also for his work in theatre he has received seven Drama Desk Awards, seven Outer Critics Circle Awards, two Obies, the Lucille Lortel Award, the Drama League Award for Distinguished Achievement in Musical Theatre, the Drama League Award for Distinguished Performance for The Nance, the Theatre World John Willis Award for Lifetime Achievement in the Theater, the Eugene O'Neill Monte Cristo Award, the New Dramatists Career Achievement Award, the Sir Peter Ustinov Comedy Award, and the Laurence Olivier Award. In 2024 Lane received the Stephen Sondheim Award from the Signature Theatre Company and the Harold S. Prince Award for Lifetime Achievement from the Drama Desk Awards.

Lane has received two Golden Globe Award nominations for The Birdcage and The Producers, the National Board of Review Award for Ensemble Acting for Nicholas Nickleby, and two Actor Awards nominations for Outstanding Performance by a Male Actor in a Supporting Role and for Outstanding Performance by a Cast in a Motion Picture for The Birdcage, winning the latter. For his work on television Lane has received eight Primetime Emmy Award nominations for guest starring roles on Frasier, Mad About You, Modern Family, and The Good Wife and won for Only Murders in the Building. He received two Daytime Emmy Awards for his voice work in Timon & Pumbaa and Teacher's Pet, as well as a nomination for George and Martha for HBO. He has received the People's Choice Award for Favorite New Actor in a Comedy and an American Comedy Award for The Birdcage as well as a nomination for Jeffrey.

== See also ==
- LGBT culture in New York City
- List of LGBT people from New York City
- List of Primetime Emmy Award winners
