= Pictures from Home =

2023 play by Sharr White

- Original language: English
- Written by: Sharr White
- Subject: Memory, family, mortality, photography
- Genre: Drama
- Setting: 1980s California

Premiere
- Date: 9 February 2023
- Place: California
- Directed by: Bartlett Sher
- Official website

Pictures from Home is a memory play written by Sharr White based on the book Pictures from Home by photographer Larry Sultan. The first production, directed by Bartlett Sher, opened in previews on 13 January 2023 at the Studio 54 theatre in New York City on Broadway. The play opened on 9 February 2023. The original Broadway cast includes Nathan Lane, Danny Burstein, and Zoë Wanamaker.

== Background ==
Photographer Larry Sultan began taking photos of his parents beginning in the early 1980s and he spent a decade, interviewing, and writing about his parents, and his relationship with them. The book was adapted by Sharr White into the play Pictures from Home. The book chronicles his childhood, his upbringing and his relationship with his parents who live in California.

Sharr White developed his script from a reading in Houston's Alley Theatre "Alley All New Festival 2020."

== Plot ==
The show is a domestic comedic drama, and exploration into the relationship between a son who is a photographer and his parents who live in California. The cast includes Danny Burstein as the son and photographer, Nathan Lane as the father and former razor salesman, and Zoë Wanamaker as his mother who later in life became a realtor. The production spans 1 hour and 45 minutes with no intermission.

== Productions ==
The play originated on Broadway at the Studio 54 theatre where the roles were originated by Burstein, Lane, and Wanamaker. The production started previews in January 13, 2023 and officially opened on February 9. Those who attended opening night included Meryl Streep, Steve Martin, Martin Short, Phillipa Soo, Brian Cox, F. Murray Abraham, Patricia Clarkson, Richard Kind, Bernadette Peters and Donna Murphy.

== Cast ==
Role	Studio 54, Broadway January 2023
Larry	Danny Burstein
Irving	Nathan Lane
Jean	Zoë Wanamaker

== Critical reception ==
The play was generally well received. Greg Evans from Deadline Hollywood compared the play favorably to An American Family and Succession and that "By the play’s end, we can’t help but feeling sympathy for all concerned, characters and actors, but, sad to say, it’s the arguments we’ll remember." The Wall Street Journal theatre critic Charles Isherwood praised Lane's performance writing "Mr. Lane makes the most of Irv’s sardonic commentary, landing laughs for almost every line, like a golfer hitting a hole in one with each swing." In Jesse Green's mixed review from The New York Times, he wrote, "Though honorable, thoughtful and wonderful to look at, with crafty performances by Danny Burstein, Zoë Wanamaker and especially Nathan Lane, it caulks so many of the book’s expressive cracks that the best thing about it — its mystery — is sealed out."
