= The Nance =

2013 play by Douglas Carter Beane

The Nance is a play written by Douglas Carter Beane. It involves the lives of burlesque performers during the 1930s. A "nance" was a camp stock character in vaudeville and burlesque. The play is a production of Lincoln Center Theater that premiered on Broadway in 2013. It received five Tony Award nominations, and won three awards. It starred Nathan Lane as Chauncey.

== Production ==
The play premiered April 15, 2013, at the Lyceum Theatre, in a Lincoln Center Theater production. The limited run was extended to August 11, 2013. Directed by Jack O'Brien, the play starred Nathan Lane as Chauncey Miles, and featured Jonny Orsini, Cady Huffman, Andréa Burns, Jenni Barber, Lewis J. Stadlen, Geoffrey Allen Murphy, and Mylinda Hull. Sets were by John Lee Beatty, costumes by Ann Roth, and choreography by Joey Pizzi. The play contains music written by Glen Kelly. A revolving set showed the stage of a burlesque house, its backstage area, and Chauncey's apartment.

The play was taped live in August 2013 for the PBS series Live from Lincoln Center. Before the play's broadcast, it was screened in movie theatres beginning June 23, 2014. The play was broadcast October 10, 2014, and was made available to view on their website immediately after the broadcast.

== Cast ==
- Chauncey Miles – a gay burlesque comic who plays a "nance" character onstage.
- Ned – a young man from upstate, he leaves his wife, and comes to New York to learn more about his sexuality. He meets and falls in love with Chauncey in an automat, and later becomes a bit performer at the theater.
- Ephraim – the leading comedian and manager of the Irving Place theater where Chauncey works.
- Sylvie – one of the strippers who works at the Irving Place, she is a member of the Communist party, and frequently argues politics with Chauncey.
- Joan – another of the strippers, more innocent and vivacious.
- Carmen – one of the strippers, who specializes in playing with an exaggerated Latin-American accent onstage.
- Charlie – the stage hand.

== Synopsis ==
The play alternates between the scenes of the characters' real lives, and sketches played at the Irving Place Theater, which serve as comment on the play itself. The play opens at an automat in Greenwich Village in 1937 where gay men congregate and arrange meetings. Chauncey Miles is a star at the Irving Place Theater, a burlesque house in New York City. He specializes in playing the "nance", a "stock character who was a flamingly effeminate homosexual". In fact, Chauncey is gay and looks for men at the automat, but he must be careful or risk being arrested. There he meets Ned, newly arrived in New York and homeless. Chauncey invites him to his apartment for a sexual encounter, assuming him to be a curious heterosexual. In the morning, however, Ned confesses that he is also gay and has recently left his wife hoping to find out more about himself. Though Chauncey is hesitant to begin a serious relationship, they become lovers.

At this time, Mayor Fiorello La Guardia is attempting to end burlesque in New York (during this period the gay population was often persecuted). Ephraim, the manager and top comic of the Irving Place Theater, warns Chauncey that the knowledge of his sexuality is attracting gay men to the theater, a fact of which the police may become aware. However, Chauncey, a passionate Republican supporter of La Guardia, believes that the attacks on burlesque and gays will stop after the election. When another of the performers suddenly quits the Irving Place to work elsewhere, Chauncey brings Ned on as a last-minute replacement. In spite of an awkward beginning, Chauncey guides him through the sketch, and Ned is given a job at the theater as a stooge in Chauncey's sketches. Ned and Chauncey's relationship becomes known and accepted by Ephraim and the theater's strippers, who become part of their regular circle of friends.

Before one performance, word reaches the troupe that the commissioner of licenses, Paul Moss, is in the audience with a number of policemen. Ephraim tells Chauncey not to play the nance character for fear of a police raid. However, unable to think of other dialogue, Chauncey plays his trademark character, kisses Ephraim onstage, and the theater is raided.

Act two begins with Chauncey in court. He defends burlesque and free expression, but serves two nights in jail. On being released, he is embarrassed to find the other members of his company are treating him as a hero. Under the new restrictions on burlesque, Chauncey is limited to performing one "nance" sketch played in drag, which he finds demeaning. The jokes in his routines turn increasingly derogatory. The other members of the company urge Chauncey to participate in a planned walkout by all the entertainment unions in the city. The conservative Chauncey is reluctant to join in. Eventually, the walkout is canceled when the unions agree to LaGuardia's restrictions.

Chauncey's relationship with Ned begins to suffer as he starts resorting to anonymous sexual encounters in parks. He starts turning away from Ned, who is now more open about his own sexuality. Ned asks Chauncey to be monogamous for him, and Chauncey initially agrees. Several weeks later, however, Ned finds Chauncey again at the automat, looking for one-night stands. Chauncey rejects Ned, telling him he has lost interest in him, and that he prefers "to be used and discarded." Ned, sensing the imminent shutdown of burlesque, tells Chauncey he has taken a job as an ensemble member in a tour of Red, Hot and Blue and asks Chauncey to join him as a last try at a monogamous relationship. Chauncey insists the crackdown on burlesque is temporary, and that he will stay where he is. Confessing his self-hatred, he rejects the offer of a monogamous relationship, telling Ned, "This is not what I should be having." He kisses Ned goodbye, but is (ironically) seen by a policeman who arrests him for deviant behavior in public after Ned has left.

Finally, Chauncey appears on stage in complete drag, playing an old prostitute. In the middle of the sketch, his loss hits him and he breaks down, alternating between grief and professional composure. Shortly after, the Irving Place Theater is closed down. Ephraim and the girls leave to perform out of state. It is revealed that Chauncey, as a repeat offender and banned from leaving New York, was offered leniency if he named the other party, (i.e., Ned), but refused to do so. The other company members sadly tell him goodbye. Chauncey stands alone on the stage of the Irving Place. As he softly sings a verse of his trademark song, a piece of the ceiling falls, narrowly missing him, and Chauncey remains center stage under a broken spotlight as the curtain falls.

== Critical response ==
The New Yorker columnist, Hilton Als, called the play a "nearly perfect work of dramatic art, whose power derives from its equitable compassion and its unromantic view of myth". Ben Brantley, in The New York Times review, wrote: "...even Mr. Lane can’t reconcile all the disparities Mr. Beane’s script asks him to weave together. By the show’s end, Chauncey has become both an eloquent hero in the fight against censorship and a crusty defender of the status quo, a figure of illuminating self-awareness and benighted denial. It is to Mr. Lane’s credit that he displays no signs of whiplash, but his audience may not be similarly immune."

== Awards and nominations ==
The play received five Tony Award nominations. Nathan Lane was nominated for the Tony Award, Drama Desk Award as Outstanding Actor in a Play, Outer Critics Circle Award, which he won, as well as the Drama League Award for Distinguished Performance. Glen Kelly won the Drama Desk Award for Outstanding Music in a Play. The play received six nominations for the Outer Critics Circle Award, and it was nominated for two Drama League Awards.

=== Original Broadway production ===
Year	Award	Category	Nominee	Result
2013	Broadway.com Audience Choice Awards	Favorite New Play		Nominated
2013	Broadway.com Audience Choice Awards	Favorite Actor in a Play	Nathan Lane	Nominated
2013	Broadway.com Audience Choice Awards	Favorite Funny Performance	Nathan Lane	Nominated
2013	Drama Desk Awards	Outstanding Actor in a Play	Nathan Lane	Nominated
2013	Drama Desk Awards	Outstanding Music in a Play	Glen Kelly	Won
2013	Drama League Awards	Outstanding Production of a Broadway or Off-Broadway Play		Nominated
2013	Drama League Awards	Distinguished Performance Award	Nathan Lane	Won
2013	Outer Critics Circle Awards	Outstanding New Broadway Play		Nominated
2013	Outer Critics Circle Awards	Outstanding Director of a Play	Jack O'Brien	Won
2013	Outer Critics Circle Awards	Outstanding Set Design	John Lee Beatty	Nominated
2013	Outer Critics Circle Awards	Outstanding Actor in a Play	Nathan Lane	Won
2013	Outer Critics Circle Awards	Outstanding Featured Actor in a Play	Jonny Orsini	Nominated
2013	Outer Critics Circle Awards	Outstanding Featured Actress in a Play	Cady Huffman	Nominated
2013	Tony Award	Best Performance by a Leading Actor in a Play	Nathan Lane	Nominated
2013	Tony Award	Best Scenic Design of a Play	John Lee Beatty	Won
2013	Tony Award	Best Costume Design of a Play	Ann Roth	Won
2013	Tony Award	Best Lighting Design of a Play	Japhy Weideman	Nominated
2013	Tony Award	Best Sound Design of a Play	Leon Rothenberg	Won
	Theatre World Award	Dorothy Loudon Award For Excellence	Jonny Orsini	Won
	The Clive Barnes Foundation	The Clive Barnes Award	Jonny Orsini	Won
