= John Cena filmography =

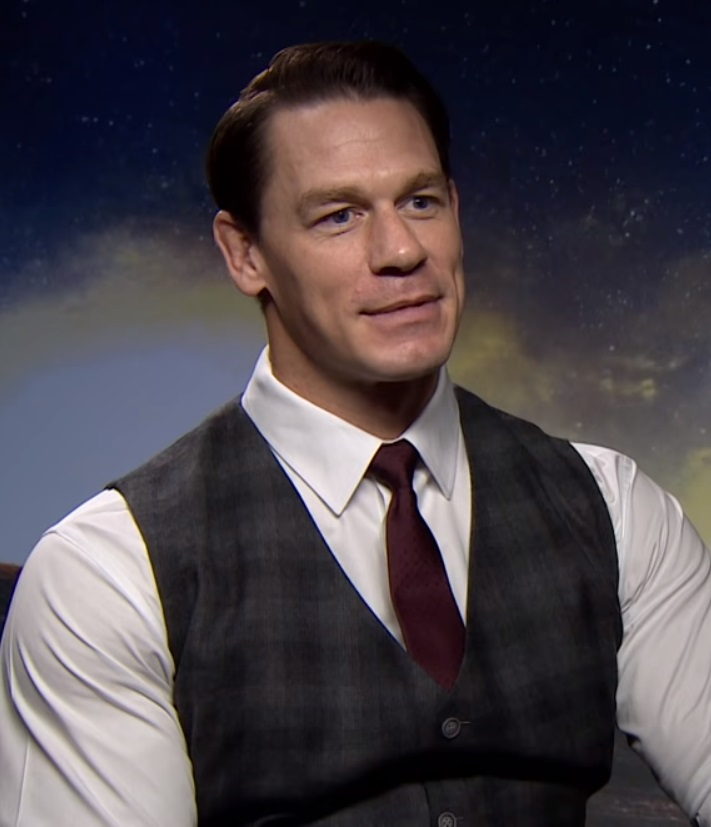
- Cena in 2018
- Film: 35
- Television film: 5
- Television series: 26
- Music videos: 1
- Others: 7 video games

John Cena is an American actor, retired professional wrestler and former rapper. The following are his roles in films, television series and video games. The filmography doesn't include his professional wrestling appearances in any form of media or featured televised productions.

== Film ==
Year	Title	Role	Notes
2000	Ready to Rumble	Gym Patron	Uncredited extra
2006	The Marine	John Triton	
2009	12 Rounds	Danny Fisher	
2010	Legendary	Mike Chetley	
2011	The Reunion	Sam Cleary	
2014	Scooby-Doo! WrestleMania Mystery	Himself (voice)	
2015	The Flintstones & WWE: Stone Age SmackDown!	John Cenastone (voice)	
2015	Trainwreck	Steven	
2015	Sisters	Pazuzu	
2015	Daddy's Home	Roger	Cameo
2017	Surf's Up 2: WaveMania	J.C. (voice)	
2017	The Wall	Staff Sergeant Shane Matthews	
2017	Daddy's Home 2	Roger	
2017	Ferdinand	Ferdinand the Bull (voice)	
2018	Blockers	Mitchell Mannes	
2018	Bumblebee	Agent Jack Burns	
2019	Playing with Fire	Jake "Supe" Carson	
2020	Dolittle	Yoshi (voice)	
2021	F9	Jakob Toretto	
2021	The Suicide Squad	Christopher Smith / Peacemaker	
2021	Vacation Friends	Ron	
2022	The Bubble	Steve	Cameo
2022	The Independent	Nate Sterling	Also executive producer
2023	Fast X	Jakob Toretto	
2023	Barbie	Kenmaid	Cameo
2023	Hidden Strike	Chris Van Horne	
2023	Teenage Mutant Ninja Turtles: Mutant Mayhem	Rocksteady (voice)	
2023	Vacation Friends 2	Ron	
2023	Freelance	Mason Pettis	
2024	Argylle	Wyatt	
2024	Ricky Stanicky	Rod / Ricky Stanicky	
2024	Jackpot!	Noel	Also executive producer
2025	Heads of State	Will Derringer	Also executive producer
2025	Superman	Christopher Smith / Peacemaker	Cameo appearance
2026	Little Brother	Rudd	
2026	Coyote vs. Acme	Buddy Crane	Filmed in 2023
2026	Matchbox: The Movie	Sean	
2027	One Attempt Remaining †	TBA	Filming
TBA	Stuntnuts: The Movie †	TBA	Post-production

== Television ==
Year	Title	Role	Notes
2001	Manhunt	Big Tim	
2007	Extreme Makeover: Home Edition	Himself	Episode: "The Noyola Family"
2007	Deal or No Deal	Himself	Episode: "March 4, 2007"
2007	Punk'd	Himself	Episode: "May 29, 2007"
2007	Fast Cars and Superstars: The Gillette Young Guns Celebrity Race	Himself	7 episodes
2009, 2016, 2021	Saturday Night Live	Himself	3 episodes Season 34, episode 18 (guest); Season 42, episode 9 (host); Season 47, episode 2 (guest)
2010	Psych	Ewan O'Hara	Episode: "You Can't Handle This Episode"
2010	Fred: The Movie	Dad Figglehorn	Television film
2010	True Jackson, VP	Himself	Episode: "Pajama Party"
2010	Hannah Montana	Himself	Episode: "Love That Lets Go"
2010	Generator Rex	Hunter Cain	Voice; Episode: "The Hunter"
2011	Fred 2: Night of the Living Fred	Dad Figglehorn	Television film
2012	Fred: The Show	Dad Figglehorn	Recurring
2012	Fred 3: Camp Fred	Dad Figglehorn	Television film
2013–2018	Total Divas	Himself	Recurring (seasons 1–6), Guest (season 7)
2015	Parks and Recreation	Himself	Episode: "The Johnny Karate Super Awesome Musical Explosion Show"
2015	Legendários	Himself	Interview
2016–2017	American Grit	Host	Also executive producer
2016	2016 ESPY Awards	Himself / Host	
2016	The Edge & Christian Show	Himself	2 episodes
2016–2018	Total Bellas	Himself	Main cast (seasons 1–3)
2017	Southpaw Regional Wrestling	Lance Catamaran	Web mini-series
2017	Tour de Pharmacy	Gustav Ditters	Television film
2017	Psych: The Movie	Ewan O'Hara	Television film
2018–2019	Rise of the Teenage Mutant Ninja Turtles	Baron Draxum	Voice; Recurring role; season one only; 8 episodes
2018	Dallas & Robo	Robo	Voice; also executive producer
2019	Are You Smarter than a 5^{th} Grader?	Host	
2019	The Substitute	Himself	Episode 1.3
2020	Last Week Tonight with John Oliver	Himself	Episode: "Conspiracy Theories about COVID-19"
2020	The Eric Andre Show	Himself	Episode: "The ASAP Ferg Show"
2021–2025	Wipeout	Himself / Host	Also executive producer
2022–2025	Peacemaker	Christopher Smith / Peacemaker	Lead role; also co-executive producer
2023	Die Hart	Mr. 206	3 episodes
2024	The Bear	Sammy Fak	Episode: "Children"
2024	The Simpsons	Himself	Episode "Bart's Birthday"
2025	Pluribus	Himself	Episode "HDP"
2025	What Drives You with John Cena	Himself	Host

== Music videos ==
Year	Title	Artist(s)	Role	Ref.
2024	"Electric Energy"	Ariana DeBose, Boy George and Nile Rodgers	Himself	

== Video games ==
=== Professional wrestling ===
Year	Title	Notes
2003	WWE WrestleMania XIX	Video game debut
2003	WWE Raw 2	
2003	WWE SmackDown! Here Comes the Pain	
2004	WWE Day of Reckoning	
2004	WWE Survivor Series	Cover athlete
2004	WWE Smackdown! vs. Raw	
2005	WWE WrestleMania 21	
2005	WWE Aftershock	
2005	WWE Day of Reckoning 2	Cover athlete
2005	WWE SmackDown! vs. Raw 2006	Cover athlete
2006	WWE SmackDown vs. Raw 2007	Cover athlete
2007	WWE SmackDown vs. Raw 2008	Cover athlete
2008	WWE SmackDown vs. Raw 2009	
2009	WWE SmackDown vs. Raw 2010	Cover athlete
2010	WWE SmackDown vs. Raw 2011	Cover athlete
2011	WWE All Stars	Cover athlete
2011	WWE '12	
2012	WWE WrestleFest	
2012	WWE '13	
2013	WWE 2K14	
2014	WWE 2K15	Cover athlete
2014	WWE SuperCard	
2015	WWE Immortals	
2015	WWE 2K16	
2016	WWE 2K17	
2017	WWE Champions	
2017	WWE Tap Mania	
2017	WWE 2K18	
2017	WWE Mayhem	
2018	WWE 2K19	
2019	WWE 2K20	
2020	WWE 2K Battlegrounds	Cover athlete
2022	WWE 2K22	
2023	WWE 2K23	Cover athlete
2024	WWE 2K24	
2025	WWE 2K25	
2026	WWE 2K26	

=== Other ===
Year	Title	Role	Notes
2014	Family Guy: The Quest for Stuff	Himself	Voice
2016	Marvel Avengers Academy	Hulk	Voice
2017	Brawlhalla	Himself	DLC
2020	The King of Fighters All Star	Himself	DLC
2022	Fortnite	Himself	
2023	Mortal Kombat 1	Christopher Smith / Peacemaker	DLC
2023	PGA Tour 2K23	Himself	
2023	Mortal Kombat: Onslaught	Christopher Smith / Peacemaker	
