= Brendan Scannell =

American actor and comedian (born 1990)

- Born: June 20, 1990 (age 36); Chicago, Illinois, U.S.
- Occupations: Actor; comedian
- Years active: 2016–present

Brendan Scannell (born June 20, 1990) is an American actor and comedian known for playing the lead roles of Heather Duke in the Paramount Network series Heathers (2018) and Pete Devin in the Netflix dark comedy series Bonding (2019–2021) for which he received a nomination for the Primetime Emmy Award for Outstanding Actor in a Short Form Comedy or Drama Series.

== Early life ==
Scannell was born in Chicago, Illinois and raised in Valparaiso, Indiana. He studied theatre at Northwestern University and started performing improv and stand-up in Chicago before moving to Los Angeles in 2013.

== Career ==
In 2016, Scannell was cast as the genderqueer Heather Duke in the TV Land adaptation of Heathers. After the pilot was ordered to series, the project was moved to Paramount Network and released in October 2018. From 2019 to 2021, Scannell starred in the short-form Netflix series Bonding opposite Zoe Levin and appeared in the indie romantic comedy Straight Up. For his work in the second season of Bonding he earned his first Primetime Emmy Award nomination for Outstanding Actor In A Short Form Comedy Or Drama Series.

As a comic, Scannell was named by Vulture in 2018 as a "Comedian You Should and Will Know" and in 2019 was named a New Face of Comedy at Just for Laughs in Montreal.

== Filmography ==
=== Film and television ===
Year	Title	Role	Notes
2016	Evan	Evan	YouTube short by "Sandy Hook Promise"
2018	Heathers	Heather Duke	Main role
2018	Lip Sync Battle	Contestant	With Melanie Field
2019–2021	Bonding	Pete	Main role
2019	Straight Up	Jerry	
2022	Bromates	Runway Dave	

== Awards and nominations ==
Year	Award	Category	Work	Result	Ref.
2021	Primetime Emmy Awards	Outstanding Actor in a Short Form Comedy or Drama Series	Bonding	Nominated	
