= Downward Dog (TV series) =

American sitcom

- Genre: Sitcom
- Created by: Samm Hodges; Michael Killen
- Starring: Allison Tolman; Ned; Lucas Neff; Kirby Howell-Baptiste; Barry Rothbart
- Voices of: Samm Hodges
- Composer: Daniel Bracken
- Country of origin: United States
- Original language: English
- No. of seasons: 1
- No. of episodes: 8

Production
- Executive producers: Samm Hodges; Michael Killen; Jimmy Miller; Sam Hansen; Kathy Dziubek; Kat Likkel; John Hoberg
- Camera setup: Single-camera
- Running time: 30 minutes
- Production companies: Mosaic Media Group; Animal Media Group; ABC Studios; Legendary Television

Original release
- Network: ABC
- Release: May 17 – June 27, 2017

Downward Dog is an American sitcom that was broadcast on ABC. The series premiered on May 17, 2017, before starting its Tuesday run on May 23, 2017. On June 24, 2017, ABC canceled the series after one season of eight episodes, with the final episode airing on June 27, 2017.

== Synopsis ==
The series follows the adventures of Martin, a philosophizing dog who sees his owner, Nan, as a beloved life partner. Martin can become vindictive and unfaithful, however, when he feels Nan is not paying enough attention to him. Nan is a millennial who has less time for her dog than she once did because of her increasing workload at Clark and Bow Outfitters.

== Cast ==
- Allison Tolman as Nan
- Ned as Martin, Nan's increasingly lonely and philosophical dog
- Samm Hodges as the voice of Martin
- Lucas Neff as Jason, Nan's ex-boyfriend and occasional "friend with benefits"
- Barry Rothbart as Kevin, Nan's insecure boss who tries to undermine Nan and her coworkers' successes
- Kirby Howell-Baptiste as Jenn, Nan's best friend and co-worker
- Maria Bamford as the voice of Pepper, a neighborhood cat that torments Martin

== Production ==
In September 2015, ABC placed a pilot order for the series, which was based on a web series by Animal Media Group. On May 12, 2016, ABC picked up the series for the 2016–17 season as a mid-season replacement. Downward Dog was filmed in Pittsburgh, Pennsylvania.

After the series' cancellation, the producers announced plans to shop it to other networks.

== Episodes ==
No.	Title	Directed by	Written by	Original release date	U.S. viewers (millions)
1	"Pilot"	Michael Killen	Samm Hodges & Michael Killen	May 17, 2017	4.67
A certain look from Martin inspires Nan to create a store imaging campaign that impresses a corporate big wig, despite her boss Kevin's initial misgivings. But the extra hours Nan now has to put in at work leaves Martin feeling lonely and neglected.
2	"Boundaries"	Michael Killen	Samm Hodges	May 23, 2017	5.74
After reevaluating her relationship with Jason, Nan installs an electronic dog door so Jason doesn't have to always be at the house to let Martin out. Martin thinks the door appeared because he "willed" it to happen, making him believe this power extends to other aspects of his life.
3	"Loyalty"	Michael Killen	Samm Hodges	May 30, 2017	3.75
To keep Kevin from meddling in her team's project, Nan brings Martin to work, knowing that Kevin is afraid of dogs. But Martin finds himself strangely drawn to Kevin, making him question his loyalty to Nan.
4	"The Full Package"	John Fortenberry	Daisy Gardner	June 6, 2017	3.45
Martin considers himself an exceptionally smart dog and decides to become more physically fit as well. He is sadly disappointed when his body doesn't cooperate. Nan begins dating a wealthy influential businessman (Timothy Omundson) under the pretense that he's helping her train Martin. He breaks up with her because she's unwilling to put in the time to make Martin a super-obedient dog.
5	"Trashed"	John Fortenberry	Morgan Murphy	June 13, 2017	3.32
Nan departs with Kevin and Jenn for a big corporate meeting in New York, leaving Jason in charge of Martin. While in Central Park, Nan sees a couple with a dog that look eerily similar to her and Jason, leading her to fantasize about how life could be. Meanwhile, Jason is distracted playing a virtual reality game, allowing Martin to get loose and go on a garbage-eating binge.
6	"Old"	Paul Murphy	Annabel Oakes	June 20, 2017	3.08
Martin turns seven and has his landmark goal, the perfect nap, interrupted by the arrival of Jenn's puppy. Meanwhile, Nan and Jenn attempt to have their own fun and recapture the spontaneity of their younger days, but can't seem to find the right fit. Nichelle Nichols makes a guest appearance.
7	"Getting What You Always Wanted"	Paul Murphy	Laura Kittrell	June 27, 2017	2.02
Everything that could possibly go wrong, and then some, does at the launch of Nan's big ad campaign. Martin concludes that Nan's stress level and Jason's disappearance are both due to fear of Pepper, the neighborhood cat, so he decides he must kill Pepper.
8	"Getting Lost"	Michael Killen	Kat Likkel and John Hoberg	June 27, 2017	1.73
Nan is offered Kevin's job and decides to take a quiet weekend away with Martin to think it over. During what was supposed to be a brief stop at her dad's house, Martin gets lost in the woods when Nan's dad takes him for a walk off-leash, causing her to have to spend the entire weekend searching for Martin. Nan and Jason reconcile as they look for Martin, and her dad redeems himself by being the one who finds him.

== Reception and legacy ==
The series has received mostly positive reviews. On review aggregator website Rotten Tomatoes the series has an approval rating of 85% based on 27 reviews. The website’s consensus reads: "The adorable and insightful -- though sometimes grating -- titular pet elevates Downward Dog from its potentially "ruff" premise into a sweet, intellectual comedy". On Metacritic, the series has a score of 71 out of 100, based on 20 critics, indicating "generally favorable reviews". However, the series was canceled after the first season.

About the show's reception and legacy, Allison Tolman said: "I'm actually quite proud of it. I think it's the perfect little season, and the perfect full story. We couldn't have asked for any better, as far as the quality of the content goes. I wish that someone would stream it, so we could share it with more people 'cause I do think it was a really special show."

== See also ==
- Downward dog, a yoga pose
