= Barry Rothbart =

American comedian, filmmaker and actor (born 1983)

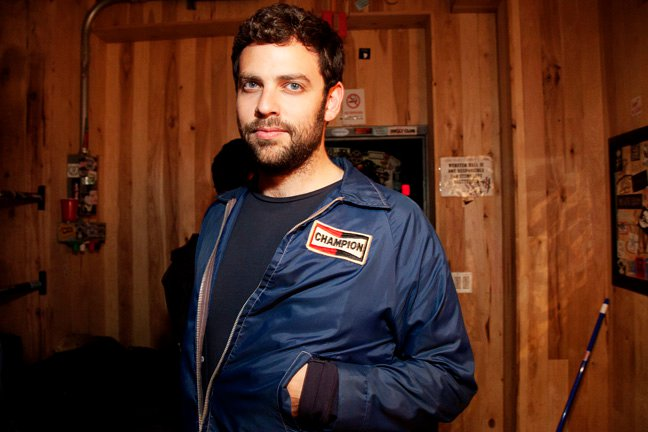
- Rothbart backstage at comedy show
- Born: 1983 (age 42–43); Forest Hills, New York, US
- Occupations: Comedian; filmmaker; actor; writer
- Website: www.barryrothbart.com

Barry Rothbart (born 1983) is an American comedian, filmmaker, actor and writer based in Los Angeles. He was named one of Variety magazine's "10 Comics to Watch" in 2013. He played Peter Deblasio in 2013's The Wolf of Wall Street, Kevin on ABC's Downward Dog and Bert on Showtime's Kidding. As a documentary filmmaker, he created the 2025 Audible Original documentary series Searching for Allan Rothbart, co-directed the 2014 feature Hungry, and produced, co-wrote and shot the 2026 SXSW Jury Award winner Summer 2000: The X-Cetra Story.

== Early life ==
Rothbart was born in Forest Hills in Queens, New York. He is Jewish.

Rothbart's father, Allan Rothbart, was a bookmaker for the Gambino crime family who told his son he was a music producer and Jon Bon Jovi's manager. Allan was arrested in 1997 and admitted his role in the operation, after which Rothbart, then in high school, did errands for his father's illegal sports betting business. Allan died of cancer in 2007. Rothbart later discussed the story on This Is Not Happening with Ari Shaffir and made it the subject of his 2025 Audible series Searching for Allan Rothbart.

Rothbart briefly attended the University of Massachusetts Lowell, where he started doing stand-up. He transferred to Pace University to study business, then left after a year to study film at Hofstra University. He took classes at the Upright Citizens Brigade Theatre before focusing on stand-up. After seven years performing in New York, he moved to Los Angeles.

== Career ==
=== Stand-up and acting ===
Rothbart started out in commercials and found early success there. In 2011, he made his stand-up television debut on The Tonight Show with Jay Leno. In 2013, Variety named him one of its "Top Ten Comics to Watch."

In 2012, he was cast on the revival of Punk'd but was fired after four episodes after his management team leaked news of his role. In 2013 he played Peter Deblasio in Martin Scorsese's The Wolf of Wall Street. In 2014, he released the stand-up album Streets of Fire on AST Records.

He played series regular Kevin on ABC's Downward Dog (2017) and a recurring role as Bert on Showtime's Kidding (2019). His film roles include The Lovebirds (2020), Vacation Friends (2021), and Who Invited Them (2022).

=== Filmmaking and producing ===
Rothbart co-directed, produced and edited the feature documentary Hungry with Jeff Cerulli. The film follows competitive eater Takeru Kobayashi and his dispute with Major League Eating, and premiered at the DOC NYC film festival at New York's IFC Center in November 2013 before a 2014 release on VOD platforms through FilmBuff.

In 2025, Rothbart created, wrote, hosted and produced the ten-part Audible Original series Searching for Allan Rothbart, a co-production with Campside Media. The series investigates his late father's secret life as a Gambino crime family bookmaker, drawing on cassette tapes Allan recorded on his deathbed.

In 2026, Rothbart produced, co-wrote and served as cinematographer on Summer 2000: The X-Cetra Story, directed by Ayden Mayeri. The documentary, which follows four childhood friends whose homemade preteen album became a cult internet hit two decades later, premiered at the SXSW Film & TV Festival, where it won both the Jury Award for Documentary Feature and the Audience Award. The film was produced under his production company Handsome Boy along with Grief Party and Extra A Productions.

In 2014, Rothbart co-created and co-produced the Comedy Central digital series 300 Sunnyside.

== Podcasts ==
Rothbart hosted Saving the World with Barry and Lucas with Lucas Neff, a free-flowing conversation about people who want to save the world. He was a guest on the Shoot This Now podcast, where he told the story of working as a videographer at a nudist colony for gay men over fifty.

He co-hosts The Podcumentary with filmmaker Jeff Cerulli, a weekly podcast about documentary films and the people who make them.

In 2025, he created, wrote and hosted the ten-part Audible Original Searching for Allan Rothbart, a co-production with Campside Media.

== Filmography ==
=== Films ===
- The Wolf of Wall Street (2013)
- Hungry (2014) — co-director, producer, editor
- Dean (2016)
- The Happytime Murders (2018) - Fireman
- The Lovebirds (2020)
- Vacation Friends (2021)
- Who Invited Them (2022)
- Summer 2000: The X-Cetra Story (2026) — producer, co-writer, cinematographer

=== Television ===
- The Tonight Show with Jay Leno (2011)
- Men of a Certain Age (2011)
- Comedy Central The Half Hour Special (2012)
- Punk'd (2012)
- Conan (2012)
- Adam DeVine's House Party (2013)
- Late Late Show with Craig Ferguson (2013)
- 300 Sunnyside (2014) — co-creator, co-producer
- @midnight (2015)
- World's Funniest Fails (2015)
- Single by 30 (2016)
- Downward Dog (2017)
- The 5th Quarter (2018)
- Kidding (2019)
- The Conners (2022)

== Discography ==
=== Albums ===
- Streets of Fire (2014)
