= It's Only a Play =

Play written by Terrence McNally

- Written by: Terrence McNally
- Characters: Julia Budder; Peter Austin; James Wicker; Virginia Noyes; Frank Finger; Ira Drew; Gus P. Head; Emma
- Original language: English
- Subject: Waiting for reviews of a new Broadway play
- Genre: Comedy
- Setting: A home in Manhattan

Premiere
- Date premiered: November 1982
- Place premiered: Actors and Directors Theatre; New York City

It's Only a Play is a play by Terrence McNally. The play originally opened off-off-Broadway in 1982. It was revived off-Broadway in 1986, and on Broadway in 2014. The plot concerns a party where a producer, playwright, director, actors and their friends eagerly wait for the opening night reviews of their Broadway play.

== Productions ==
It's Only a Play was revised from an unsuccessful 1978 play originally entitled Broadway, Broadway, which had closed during tryouts in Philadelphia in 1978. Geraldine Page and James Coco were in the Philadelphia cast, and the play was set to open on Broadway at the Eugene O'Neill Theatre. However, the Philadelphia reviews were negative and the Broadway opening was canceled. In 1984, McNally said that after Broadway, Broadway closed he was no longer confident, but finally realized that having a show close is not the worst thing that could happen.

The play, rewritten and retitled, was produced off-off-Broadway by Manhattan Punch Line at the Actors and Directors Theatre, in November 1982. Paul Benedict directed, with a cast that included Frances Cuka as Julia Budder, Richard Leighton as James Wicker, Paul Guilfoyle as Frank Finger, Ken Kliban as Ira Drew and Harriet Rogers as Emma.

The play was revived off-Broadway by the Manhattan Theatre Club at New York City Center Stage 1, with previews starting December 17, 1985, and running from January 11, 1986, to January 26, 1986. Directed by John Tillinger, the cast featured Christine Baranski (Julia Budder), Paul Benedict (Ira Drew), Mark Blum (Peter Austin), James Coco (James Wicker), David Garrison (Frank Finger), Joanna Gleason (Virginia Noyes) and Florence Stanley (Emma). John Tillinger was nominated for the 1986 Drama Desk Award for Outstanding Director of a Play.

A revised version was produced by the Center Theatre Group/Ahmanson at the Doolittle Theatre, Los Angeles, California, in April 1992. John Tillinger directed, with a cast that featured Eileen Brennan (Virginia Noyes), Sean O'Bryan (Gus, a waiter), Charles Nelson Reilly (James Wicker), David Hyde Pierce (Frank Finger), Dana Ivey (Julia Budder), Paul Benedict (Ira Drew), Željko Ivanek (Peter Austin) and Doris Roberts (Emma).

It's Only a Play began its Broadway run at the Gerald Schoenfeld Theatre on August 28, 2014, in previews and officially opened on October 9, 2014. McNally rewrote the play again to bring the setting to the current day, and replaced the character of Emma with Gus, an aspiring actor. It was originally scheduled for a limited 18-week engagement, through January 4, 2015, that was later extended to June 7, 2015. Tom Kirdahy produced and Jack O'Brien directed, with a cast that starred Nathan Lane as James Wicker and Matthew Broderick as Peter Austin. Also featured in the cast were Megan Mullally as Julia Budder, Stockard Channing as Virginia Noyes, F. Murray Abraham as Ira Drew, Rupert Grint as Frank Finger, and Micah Stock as Gus. In November 2014, it was announced that the play would extend its run through January 18, 2015, at the Schoenfeld, and then transfer to the Bernard B. Jacobs Theatre in a run from January 23, 2015, to March 29, 2015. Martin Short replaced Lane in the role of James Wicker as of January 7, 2015. Additionally, Katie Finneran and Maulik Pancholy replaced Mullally and Grint.

On January 29, 2015, it was announced that the play would further extend its run until June 7, 2015. Nathan Lane returned to the cast on March 31, 2015 (after the play he was in, The Iceman Cometh, ended). Additionally, T.R. Knight joined the cast as Frank Finger on March 31, 2015.

On December 17, 2014, it was announced that the play had recouped its "$3.9 million capitalization". Variety noted the "consistent strength of the show's box office" and called it a "megaseller".

== Plot ==
A wealthy first-time Broadway producer, Julia Budder, is throwing an opening night party for The Golden Egg at her luxurious Manhattan home. The playwright, Peter Austin, is joined by the director, a lead actor, and assorted friends and hangers-on (including a critic) as they nervously wait for the late-night reviews printed in the newspapers. As they wait, they gossip and name-drop celebrities who are in attendance and chat about their respective theater experiences. Virginia Noyes, the star of the show, is taking drugs. James Wicker, an old friend of the playwright, is now a successful TV actor who turned down the lead in the play, and is relieved and secretly thrilled about the bad reviews that arrive. And, although Ira Drew is a theater critic, he is very critical of the theater because he has no talent to actually participate, despite his secretly writing plays. Not discouraged by the bad reviews for The Golden Egg, the assembled parties eagerly make plans for their next play, which they know will be a hit.

Cast of characters

- James Wicker, television actor and Peter's best friend who passed over the lead in The Golden Egg
- Julia Budder, a rich, first-time solo producer of Peter's play and hostess of the opening night party
- Peter Austin, the playwright of The Golden Egg
- Virginia Noyes, dissolute, aging star of the play
- Frank Finger, the young, egomaniacal, "genius" British director
- Ira Drew, savage theater critic
- Gus P. Head, the coat-check boy who aspires to be on Broadway
- Emma, a no-nonsense taxi driver (dropped from the 2014 revival)

== Principal cast ==
Character	Off-Broadway	Los Angeles	Broadway
Character	1985	1992	2014
Peter Austin	Mark Blum	Zeljko Ivanek	Matthew Broderick
Julia Budder	Christine Baranski	Dana Ivey	Megan Mullally
Ira Drew	Paul Benedict	Paul Benedict	F. Murray Abraham
Franklin Finger	David Garrison	David Hyde Pierce	Rupert Grint
Virginia Noyers	Joanna Gleason	Eileen Brennan	Stockard Channing
James Wicker	James Coco	Charles Nelson Reilly	Nathan Lane
Gus P. Head	Jihmi Kennedy	Sean O'Bryan	Micah Stock
Emma	Florence Stanley	Doris Roberts	N/A

== Critical reception ==
John Simon, in his review of the 1982 off-off-Broadway production for New York Magazine called the play "truly amusing", while noting that the play is missing "the interaction of characters on a plot as well as confrontational level."

Michael Kuchwara, in his review of the 1986 off-Broadway production for the Associated Press, called the play a "maliciously funny diatribe about the desperate and demented business of producing a play on Broadway."

== Awards and nominations ==
Year	Award Ceremony	Category	Nominee	Result
2015	Tony Award	Best Featured Actor in a Play	Micah Stock	Nominated
2015	Drama Desk Award	Outstanding Featured Actor in a Play	F. Murray Abraham	Nominated
2015	Theatre World Award		Micah Stock	Honoree
2015	Broadway.com Audience Choice Awards	Favorite Featured Actor in a Play	Rupert Grint	Won
2015	Broadway.com Audience Choice Awards	Favorite Funny Performance	Rupert Grint	Nominated
2015	Broadway.com Audience Choice Awards	Favorite Breakthrough Performance (Male)	Rupert Grint	Won
