= The Long Home =

Unreleased independent drama film

- Directed by: James Franco
- Screenplay by: Vince Jolivett; Steve Janas
- Based on: The Long Home by William Gay
- Produced by: James Franco; Vince Jolivett; Jay Davis
- Starring: James Franco; Josh Hutcherson; Tim Blake Nelson; Courtney Love; Robin Lord Taylor; Timothy Hutton; Giancarlo Esposito; Ashton Kutcher; Josh Hartnett; Zoe Levin
- Cinematography: Bruce Thierry Cheung
- Edited by: Leo Scott
- Music by: Aaron Embry
- Production company: Rabbit Bandini Productions
- Running time: 96 minutes
- Country: United States
- Language: English

The Long Home is an American unreleased indie drama film directed by and starring James Franco, based on the 1999 novel of the same name by William Gay. It also stars Josh Hutcherson, Tim Blake Nelson, Courtney Love, Timothy Hutton, Giancarlo Esposito, Ashton Kutcher, Josh Hartnett, Zoe Levin, Lio Tipton, Scott Haze, and Robin Lord Taylor. Principal photography began on May 1, 2015. The film was completed, but no official release has ever been announced.

== Plot ==
Dallas Hardin, a corrupt businessman and bootlegger who dominates his small Tennessee town, murders honest workingman Nathan Winer in 1932. In the 1950s, Nathan Winer Jr., the dead man's son, is unaware of Hardin's role in his father's death and works as a carpenter for Hardin. Nathan Jr. is in love with Amber Rose, a young local girl whom Hardin employs as an escort. Elderly local recluse William Tell Oliver has evidence to prove Hardin is a murderer. Eerie events hint at a supernatural justice working its way out.

== Cast ==
- Josh Hutcherson as Nathan Winer Jr.
- Zoe Levin as Amber Rose
- Tim Blake Nelson as Hovington
- James Franco as Dallas Hardin
- Courtney Love as Pearl
- Timothy Hutton
- Giancarlo Esposito as William Tell Oliver
- Ashton Kutcher as Nathan Winer Sr.
- Robin Lord Taylor as Lipscomb
- Josh Hartnett
- Lio Tipton
- Scott Haze as Weimer
- Gabrielle Haugh as Grace Blalock
- Leila George as Edna Hodges
- Austin Stowell
- Garret Dillahunt as Bellwether
- Beth Grant as Mrs. Winer

== Production ==
=== Pre-production ===
James Franco would direct, produce (through Rabbit Bandini Productions), and star in the film adaption of the William Gay novel of the same name. Robert Halmi Jr. and Jim Reeve would be executive producers.

The Long Home was offered up to $288,355 in Ohio film tax credits.

=== Casting ===
Franco posted on Instagram a list of The Long Home cast which included Josh Hutcherson, Timothy Hutton, Keegan Allen, Ashley Greene, Tim Blake Nelson, Jim Parrack, and Scott Haze.

Tim Blake Nelson collaborated with Franco for the seventh time as Hovington, a bootlegging patriarch. Josh Hutcherson starred as Nathan Winer. Hutton and Courtney Love were cast. Giancarlo Esposito played William Tell Oliver, "a Southern salt-of-the-earth man with a colorful, checkered life spent entirely within the confines of the country". Several other actors signed on to the cast: Ashton Kutcher, Josh Hartnett, Zoe Levin (as Amber Rose), Lio Tipton, Haze, and Robin Lord Taylor.

=== Filming ===
The film was shot in Eaton, Ohio, Hamilton, Ohio, and Cincinnati, Ohio.

Principal photography began on May 1, 2015 in Hamilton. This coincided with filming of another Franco film, Goat, which was shot "pretty much simultaneously". Filming began in Eaton on May 17. Production on the film wrapped on May 23, 2015, with filming lasting 23 days.

==== Accusations of inappropriate sexual behavior ====
In January 2018, at least five women who worked on the film accused Franco of inappropriate sexual behavior during filming.

== Release ==
The Long Home was tentatively expected to be released in 2017, and in November of that year, the sales rights to the movie were acquired by Great Point Media. Largely because of the misconduct allegations and resulting lawsuit, the film has not been released as of 2026.
