= Lil Rel Howery =

American comedian and actor (born 1979)

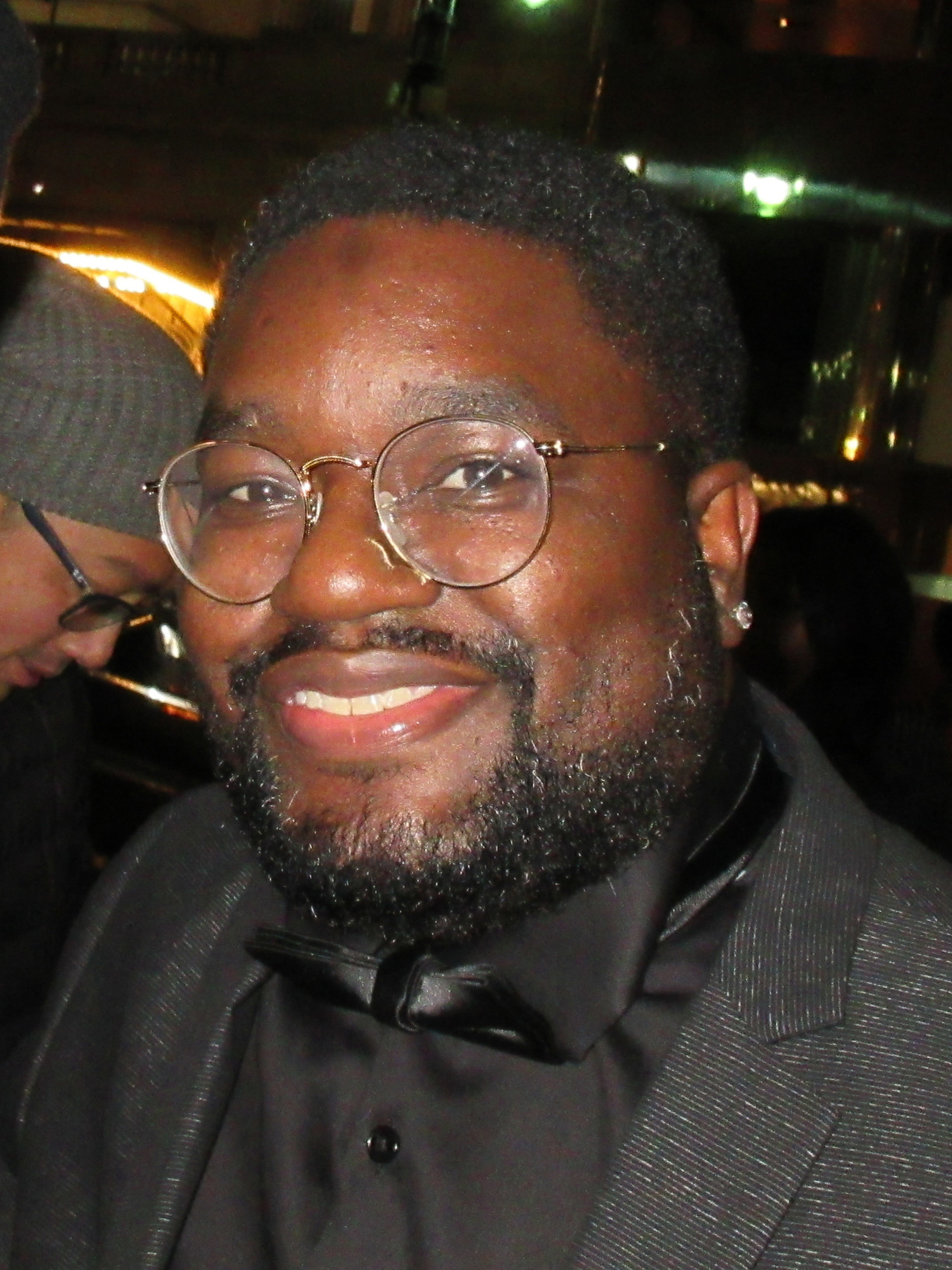
- Howery in 2018
- Born: Milton Howery Jr. December 17, 1979 (age 46); Chicago, Illinois, U.S.
- Spouse: Verina Robinson (m. 2008; div. 2017)
- Children: 3

Comedy career
- Years active: 2001–present
- Medium: Stand-up; television; film

Milton "Lil Rel" Howery Jr. (born December 17, 1979) is an American stand-up comedian and actor. He is known for playing Robert Carmichael in NBC's television comedy series The Carmichael Show (2015–2017) and Rod Williams in the horror film Get Out (2017). He starred in the short-lived TV series Rel (2018–2019), which he created and co-produced.

== Early life ==
Milton Howery Jr. grew up on the West Side of Chicago, the son of Nancy and Milton. He attended Providence St. Mel School from fifth grade to ninth. He transferred to Crane High School. At Crane, Howery wrote jokes and created a script in a senior talent show, after which he decided to pursue comedy professionally. Playing high school basketball, he reminded people of his older cousin Darrel, and was nicknamed Lil Rel.

== Career ==
Howery began performing comedy in Chicago. He made his television debut in January 2007 on the reality television competition Last Comic Standing. The same year, he was on P. Diddy Presents: The Bad Boys of Comedy on HBO. In 2009, he was part of America's National Night Out Against Crime in Chicago.

In 2012, Howery and five other comedians starred in Fox's revival of the 1990s sketch program In Living Color. The show was canceled in 2013. Howery went on to work as a writer, producer, and one of the regular cast members of the truTV sketch comedy series Friends of the People. In 2015, he began co-starring as Bobby Carmichael on the NBC sitcom The Carmichael Show alongside the show's creator, Jerrod Carmichael.

In early 2016, Netflix added Howery's first exclusive solo stand-up special, Kevin Hart Presents: Lil Rel: RELevent, for streaming in the United States.

Howery won the 2017 "Best Comedic Performance" MTV Movie & TV Award for his performance in Jordan Peele's satirical horror film Get Out.

On May 10, 2018, Fox picked up Rel, a sitcom starring Howery in the lead role and Jerrod Carmichael and Mike Scully serving as executive producers. Howery said the show is loosely based on his own life, including being a divorced father. The series premiered September 9, 2018.

Howery starred alongside Ryan Reynolds in the comedy film Free Guy. He played Buddy, a security guard.

From 2019 to 2022, Howery played the character Bishop on the HBO Max sitcom South Side.

In 2019, HBO released Howery's second stand-up special, Lil Rel Howery: Live in Crenshaw. His third special, I said it. Y'all thinking it. was filmed in his hometown of Chicago and released in 2022. He starred in several films from 2022 to 2023 such as I Love My Dad, Deep Water, and Vacation Friends 2. In 2024, he would have a role in the film adaptation of Harold and the Purple Crayon, playing Harold's friend Moose.

== Personal life ==
Howery married Verina Robinson on November 24, 2008. They have two children. The couple divorced in 2017.

In June 2016, Howery was a passenger in a vehicle that struck another car in University Village, Chicago. The driver in the other car argued with Howery and called 911, claiming that Howery had punched him in the face. The driver of the car in which Howery was riding drove away without him. Police officers arrested Howery on a charge of misdemeanor battery, but he was found not guilty. The driver sued Howery for injuries suffered during the fight.

== Filmography ==
=== Film ===
| Year | Title | Role | Notes |
|---|---|---|---|
| 2017 | Get Out | Rod Williams | |
| 2018 | Tag | Reggie | |
| 2018 | Uncle Drew | Dax Winslow | |
| 2018 | Bird Box | Charlie | |
| 2019 | Brittany Runs a Marathon | Demetrius | |
| 2019 | Good Boys | Lucas' Dad | |
| 2019 | The Angry Birds Movie 2 | Alex (voice) | |
| 2020 | The Photograph | Kyle | |
| 2020 | Clouds | Milton Weaver | |
| 2020 | Home | Jayden | Also executive producer |
| 2021 | Judas and the Black Messiah | Wayne | |
| 2021 | Tom & Jerry | Tom's shoulder devil and angel (voice) | |
| 2021 | Bad Trip | Bud Malone | |
| 2021 | Fatherhood | Jordan | |
| 2021 | Space Jam: A New Legacy | Himself (Game Announcer) | Cameo |
| 2021 | Free Guy | Buddy | |
| 2021 | Vacation Friends | Marcus Parker | |
| 2021 | National Champions | Coach Ronnie Dunn | |
| 2022 | I Love My Dad | Jimmy | |
| 2022 | Spin Me Round | Paul | |
| 2022 | Deep Water | Grant | |
| 2022 | Luck | Marv (voice) | |
| 2022 | Bromates | Jonesie | |
| 2023 | The Out-Laws | Tyree | |
| 2023 | Vacation Friends 2 | Marcus Parker | |
| 2023 | We Grown Now | Jason | |
| 2023 | Paw Patrol: The Mighty Movie | Sam Stringer (voice) | |
| 2023 | The Mill | Joe | |
| 2023 | Dashing Through the Snow | Nick | |
| 2023 | Good Burger 2 | Cecil McNevin | |
| 2024 | Reunion | Ray | Also producer |
| 2024 | Harold and the Purple Crayon | Moose | Also voice |
| 2025 | One of Them Days | The Buyer | |
| 2025 | Dog Man | Chief (voice) | |
| 2025 | Too Good | Michael | Short film; post-production |
| 2025 | Code 3 | Mike | Also executive producer |
| 2025 | Haunted Heist | TBA | Also director and producer |
| 2025 | Unexpected Christmas | Richard | |
| 2026 | F*ck Valentine's Day | Steve | |
| 2027 | Animal Friends | TBA | Post-production |

=== Television ===
| Year | Title | Role | Notes |
|---|---|---|---|
| 2014 | Friends of the People | Various | Writer, producer, cast |
| 2015 | Kevin Hart Presents: Lil Rel: RELevent | Himself | Standup special |
| 2015–17 | The Carmichael Show | Bobby Carmichael | Starring role |
| 2016 | Acting Out | Himself | |
| 2017 | Insecure | Quentin | 5 episodes |
| 2017 | Drop the Mic | Himself | Episode: "Nicole Scherzinger vs. Lil Rel Howery / Charlie Puth vs. Backstreet Boys" |
| 2018 | Lip Sync Battle | Himself | Episode: "Lil Rel Howery vs. Naya Rivera" |
| 2018–19 | Rel | Rel | Main role |
| 2018 | The Comedy Central Roast | Himself | Episode: "Bruce Willis" |
| 2018 | The Bobby Brown Story | Brian Irvine | 2 episodes |
| 2019 | Rapunzel's Tangled Adventure | Virtuous St. Goodberry (voice) | Episode: "The Eye of Pincosta" |
| 2019 | The Adventures of Rocky and Bullwinkle | Chuckles (voice) | Episode: "If You Can't Beat 'em, Totem! or It's Raining Gems!" |
| 2019 | South Side | Bishop | 3 episodes |
| 2019 | Sherman's Showcase | Himself | Episode: “The Ladies of Showcase” |
| 2019 | A Black Lady Sketch Show | Fake Manager | Episode: "Born at Night, But Not Last Night" |
| 2019 | Lil Rel Howery: Live in Crenshaw | Himself | Standup special |
| 2019–2025 | Craig of the Creek | Darnell (voice) | 3 episodes |
| 2020 | The Chi | Zeke Remnick | 2 episodes |
| 2021 | Nailed It! | Himself | Episode: "We're Gonna Need a Bigger Cake" |
| 2021 | Small Fortune | Host | Also executive producer |
| 2022 | Eureka! | Rollo (voice) | Main role |
| 2022 | I said it. Y'all thinking it. | Himself | Standup special |
| 2022 | We Baby Bears | Uncle Orion | Episode: "Uncle Orion" |
| 2023 | Poker Face | Taffy Boyle | Episode: "The Stall" |
| 2023 | Harlem | Freddie Wilson | Episode: "As Assist from the Sidelines" |
| 2025 | The Studio | Himself | Episode: "Casting" |
| 2025 | Win or Lose | James (voice) | 3 episodes |
| 2026 | Diarra from Detroit | "Film School" | Episode: "Michigan Jones and the Brightmoor Adventure" |
