= Yvonne Orji =

Nigerian actress (born 1983)

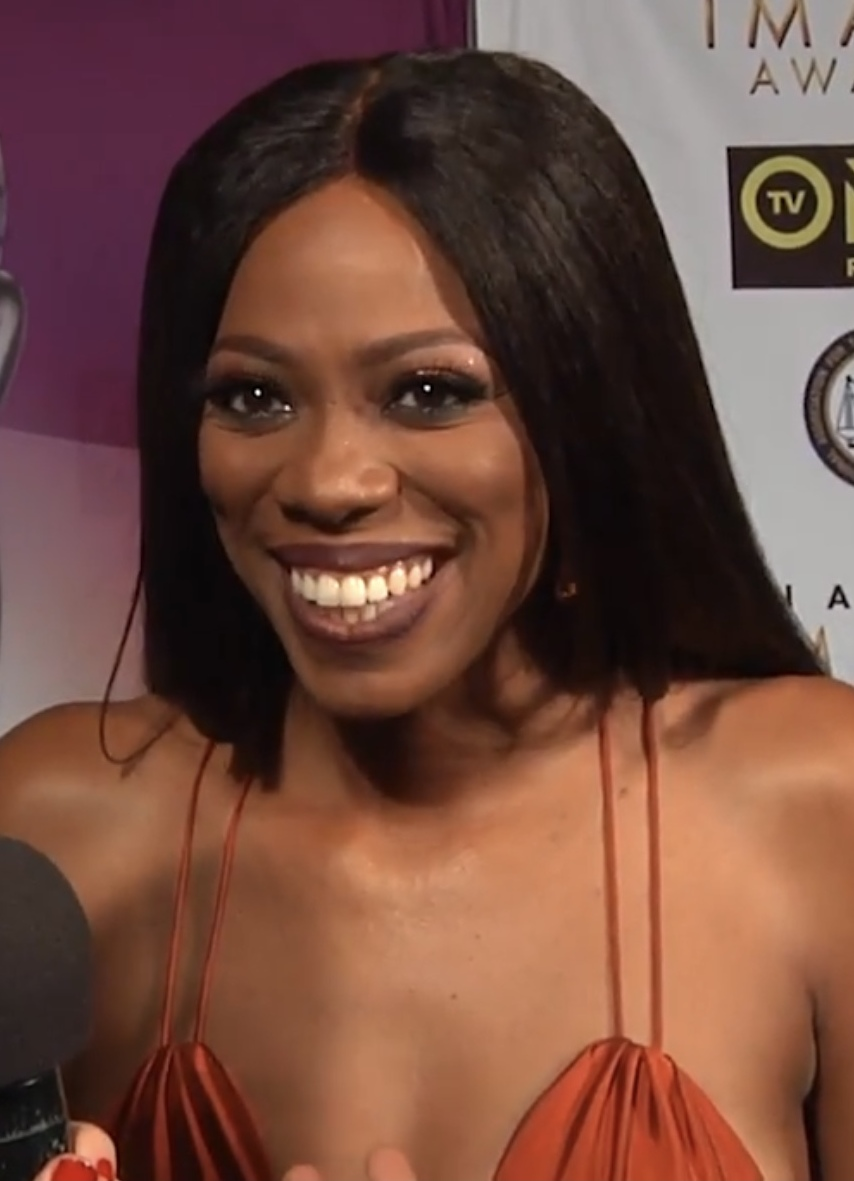
- Orji in 2017
- Born: Yvonne Anuli Orji; 2 December 1983 (age 42); Port Harcourt, Rivers State, Nigeria
- Education: George Washington University (BA, MPH)
- Occupations: Actress; comedian
- Years active: 2011–present

Yvonne Anuli Orji // (born 2 December 1983) is a Nigerian actress and comedian. She is best known for her role in the television series Insecure (2016–2021), for which she was nominated for a Primetime Emmy Award and three NAACP Image Awards.

== Life and career ==
Orji was born on 2 December 1983, in Port Harcourt, Rivers State, Nigeria to Igbo parents, and she grew up in Laurel, Maryland, in the United States. She spent her high school years in the small town of Lititz, Pennsylvania, where she attended Linden Hall, the oldest all-girls boarding school in the country. Raised Catholic, Orji is now a devout Protestant and has stated that she will remain a virgin until marriage.

She earned both a bachelor's degree in liberal arts and a master's degree in public health from George Washington University. Orji's parents expected her to become a doctor, lawyer, pharmacist, or engineer. However, she was inspired to do comedy as a graduate student when she performed stand-up in the talent portion of a beauty pageant.

After graduate school, in 2009, Orji moved to New York City to pursue a career in comedy. In 2015, she landed a starring role on Insecure without an agent or any real acting experience. On the show, she plays Molly Carter, a lawyer and the best friend of main character Issa Dee, played by series creator Issa Rae. Throughout the series, her performance consistently garnered acclaim and critics often named her the show's MVP in their reviews. In 2021, she began development on a series for Disney+ titled First Gen. The series is based on her personal life and is produced by Oprah Winfrey and David Oyelowo. Orji is the author of the book Bamboozled by Jesus.

She gave a speech at TEDxWilmingtonSalon in 2017 titled, "The wait is sexy". In the talk, she explains her reasons for abstaining from sex before marriage.

She cohosted the 2021 International Emmy Awards. She also hosted the romantic comedy reality dating series My Mom, Your Dad, which premiered on HBO Max in 2022, which ran for a single season.

In 2023, Orji voiced Tess, the estranged wife of secret bounty hunter Terry, a recurring character in My Dad the Bounty Hunter. Also in 2023, Orji had signed a two-year first-look deal with Sony Pictures Television.

In April 2025, Orji began hosting Pop The Balloon Live on Netflix, the live version of the YouTube dating show Pop the Balloon or Find Love.

== Charitable efforts ==
In 2008 and 2009 she spent six months working in post-conflict Liberia, with Population Services International (PSI), an NGO that utilizes social marketing in the adoption of healthy behaviors. While in Liberia, she worked with youth to help build a mentoring program as well as a weekly talk show to educate and prevent the spread of teen pregnancy and HIV/AIDS. She is currently an (RED) Ambassador, a Literacy Champion for Jumpstart, and working with JetBlue for Good.

== Filmography ==
=== Film ===
Year	Title	Role	Notes
2013	Sex (Therapy) with the Jones	Moshinda	Short film
2015	Tempting Fate	Mama Ugo	Directed by Kevin Nwankwor
2018	Night School	Maya	Comedy
2020	Spontaneous	Agent Carla Rosetti	Alongside Katherine Langford, Charlie Plummer
2021	Vacation Friends	Emily Conway-Parker	Adventure / Comedy
2022	The Blackening	Morgan	Alongside Grace Byers, Jermaine Fowler, Melvin Gregg
2023	Vacation Friends 2	Emily Conway-Parker	Directed by Clay Tarver
2025	The Wrong Paris	Rachel	
2026	Misty Green	Dr. Waples	

=== Television ===
Year	Title	Role	Notes
2011	Love That Girl!	Njideka	Episode: "Head Shrunk"
2016–2021	Insecure	Molly Carter	42 episodes
2017	Jane the Virgin	Stacy	2 episodes
2017	Flip the Script	Ad Exec 1	Episode: "Mad Woman"
2019	A Black Lady Sketch Show	Flight attendant	Episode: "Why Are Her Pies Wet, Lord?"
2020	Momma, I Made It!	Herself	HBO comedy special
2021	Yearly Departed	Herself - Host	Amazon Prime Video comedy special
2022	The Wonder Years	Tammy	Episode: "Love & War"
2022	A Whole Me	Herself	HBO comedy special
2023–2024	Velma	Gigi, Sammy (voice)	9 episodes
2023	My Dad the Bounty Hunter	Tess (voice)	13 episodes
2025–present	The Chosen Adventures	Pigeon (voice)	14 episodes

== Awards and nominations ==
Year	Award	Category	Work	Result
2020	Primetime Emmy Awards	Outstanding Supporting Actress in a Comedy Series	Insecure	Nominated
