= Reunion (2024 film) =

- Promotional poster
- Directed by: Chris Nelson
- Written by: Jake Emanuel; Willie Block
- Produced by: Todd Garner; Ben Silverman; Peter Principato; Mark Korshak; Mickey Schiff; Lil Rel Howery
- Starring: Lil Rel Howery; Billy Magnussen; Jillian Bell; Jamie Chung; Michael Hitchcock; Nina Dobrev; Chace Crawford
- Cinematography: Dino Parks
- Edited by: Rick Grayson
- Music by: Fil Eisler
- Production companies: Spyglass Media Group; Artists Road; Unique Features
- Distributed by: Republic Pictures; Lionsgate
- Release dates: April 13, 2024 (Brazil); June 28, 2024 (United States)
- Running time: 90 minutes
- Country: United States
- Language: English

Reunion is a 2024 American comedy mystery film directed by Chris Nelson and starring Lil Rel Howery, Billy Magnussen, Jillian Bell, Jamie Chung, Michael Hitchcock, Nina Dobrev, and Chace Crawford. The film is set during the aftermath of a twenty-year high school reunion, when an obnoxious popular student is murdered and his former classmates are left to figure out who among them is responsible.

== Plot ==
The film takes place on the night of the twenty-year reunion of Ridgeview High School's Class of 2001. The celebration is being hosted at the home of successful hedge fund manager Mathew Danbury, and the attendees include police officer Evan West, his best friend, career-wise unsuccessful Ray Hammond, journalist Jasmine Park, weirdo Vivian Chase, politician Amanda Tanner, former popular girl Meagan Cooper, and their former teacher, Mr. Theodore Buckley.

During the reunion, Evan and Jasmine start to form a romantic connection, while Ray keeps making advances on an unreceptive Meagan until the two have a loud argument. Mathew claims to be happily married but flirts with many of the women at the party, including Meagan. Later, Mathew dresses up as the mascot of their high school football team and dances with everyone. Vivian interrupts the festivities to make a speech about how Mathew tormented her during high school. A severe snowstorm forces most of the attendees to leave the party early, but Evan, Ray, Jasmine, Vivian, Amanda, and Mr. Buckley are all too drunk to drive and elect to stay at Mathew's house.

In the morning, Jasmine discovers Mathew's dead body in his bedroom, shot once in the chest. The phone lines are down from the storm, preventing the group from calling the authorities, and there's no evidence that anyone has left the house since the snowstorm ended. Jasmine and Amanda both discover late-night sexts from Mathew, from which Evan deduces that Mathew was killed after the snowstorm ended, suggesting that one of the people in the house is the killer. It quickly becomes apparent that everyone had a motive to kill Mathew dating back to their bad high school experiences.

Evan and Ray investigate the scene of the murder, noting the window that was open during the snowstorm and a bullet hole in the wardrobe door. Ray finds an earring in the wardrobe and chooses to hide it from Evan. Later, the group elects to search one another's pockets, and Evan discovers the earring, which Ray claims he found on the dance floor. In trios, they search the house for clues, and Amanda is discovered trying to hide a VHS tape from high school. The tape shows her and Mathew using peanut butter to poison her rival for class president, a nut allergy sufferer. Amanda says that someone contacted her with knowledge of the tape and blackmailed her into shutting off the power at a certain time. The group makes plans to sleep in separate locked rooms for their own protection.

During the night, Jasmine sneaks into Mathew's office and accesses the records on his computer. While returning to her room, she is chased and knocked unconscious by someone wearing the high school mascot costume. The next morning, Jasmine tells the group that she came to the reunion to gain evidence of Mathew's hedge fund being engaged in illegal activities. The records contain evidence that Buckley had been defrauded of his life savings by Mathew. Vivian notices that one of their cars has an open trunk, and when Evan and Ray investigate, they find Meagan's dead body. Footprints in the snow match Ray's boots, and the group remembers Ray and Meagan's argument during the party, leading them to conclude that Ray killed Meagan and Mathew out of jealousy.

The phone lines are restored and Mathew's wife Lisa arrives with local police. Ray is taken into custody, but he snatches a gun and forces everyone into the sitting room while he pieces together the crime. He concludes that Mathew was murdered by Lisa, who blackmailed Amanda into turning off the power to facilitate the crime. Lisa opened the bedroom window to freeze the body overnight, making it impossible to establish the time of death. Then she joined the party wearing the mascot costume so nobody would realize Mathew was already dead. Lisa only killed Meagan because the latter had snuck into Mathew's bedroom and witnessed the crime hiding in the wardrobe. Furthermore, Ray reveals that Lisa had an accomplice in Evan, her lover, who sent the sexts from Mathew's phone and disposed of Meagan's body in such a way that Ray would be implicated. The group finds Lisa and Evan's messages to each other on a mobile gaming app, proving their guilt and Ray's innocence.

As the police take Evan and Lisa into custody, Jasmine offers Ray a job as an investigator for her newspaper. Ray, Jasmine, Vivian, Amanda, and Buckley take an awkward photo together to commemorate the experience.

== Cast ==
- Lil Rel Howery as Ray Hammond
- Billy Magnussen as Evan West
- Jillian Bell as Vivian Chase
- Jamie Chung as Jasmine Park
- Michael Hitchcock as Mr. Theodore Buckley
- Dianne Doan as Lisa Danbury
- Cassandra Blair as Meagan Cooper
- Nina Dobrev as Amanda Tanner
- Chace Crawford as Mathew Danbury

== Production ==
In August 2021, it was announced that Howery, Magnussen, and Bell would be cast in the film, with filming set to occur in Los Angeles in the autumn. Later that same month, it was announced that Dobrev, Chung, Hitchcock, and Crawford had joined the cast, with production set to begin in Los Angeles the week the announcement was made. On September 16, 2021, it was announced that Doan had joined the cast and that filming was taking place in Los Angeles. On September 23, 2021, it was announced that Blair had joined the cast.

In November 2021, it was announced that filming had wrapped.

== Release ==
The film was first released in Brazil on Paramount+ on April 13, 2024, and was released digitally in the United States on June 28, 2024.

== Reception ==
On the review aggregator website Rotten Tomatoes, 50% of 6 critics' reviews are positive, with an average rating of 5.2/10. The movie was described as sharing the premise and echoing the casting of The Afterparty.
