= Bromates (film) =

- Film poster
- Directed by: Court Crandall
- Written by: Court Crandall; Chris Kemper
- Produced by: Nicholas Tabarrok
- Starring: Josh Brener; Lil Rel Howery; Brendan Scannell; Asif Ali
- Cinematography: S. Jacob Pinger
- Edited by: Steven Nevius
- Music by: P. J. Hanke
- Production companies: Snoopadelic Films; Darius Films; Grambo Productions; Palmetto Clean Technology
- Distributed by: Quiver Distribution
- Release dates: September 23, 2022 (BFF); October 7, 2022 (United States)
- Running time: 98 minutes
- Country: United States
- Language: English

Bromates is a 2022 American buddy comedy film directed by Court Crandall and starring Josh Brener and Lil Rel Howery. Snoop Dogg serves as an executive producer of the film.

== Plot ==
Longtime best friends Sid and Jonesie are dumped by their respective girlfriends. Both without a living situation, they decide to become "bromates", bros who are roommates, which puts their relationship to the ultimate test.

== Cast ==
- Josh Brener as Sid
- Lil Rel Howery as Jonesie
- Asif Ali as Angry Mike
- Brendan Scannell as Runway Dave
- Taryn Manning as Darlene
- Jessica Lowe as Sadie
- Marla Gibbs
- Flula Borg as Clos
- Nelcie Souffrant as Charlotte
- Ken Davitian as Kaloosh
- Rob Riggle
- Snoop Dogg as himself
- Parvesh Cheena as Raj
- Jamie Brewer

== Release ==
In August 2022, it was announced that Quiver Distribution acquired worldwide rights to the film, which was released theatrically and on video on demand on October 7, 2022.

The film premiered at the Boston Film Festival on September 23, 2022.

== Reception ==
The film has a 0% rating on Rotten Tomatoes based on five reviews.

Brittany Witherspoon of Screen Rant awarded the film two stars out of five and wrote, "There’s an enormous effort to entertain, but Bromates runs out of ideas faster than it can provide organic laughs."

Julian Roman of MovieWeb gave the film a negative review and wrote, "The film is actually funny with several stand-out scenes. The ensemble cast of famous comedians keep the laughs flowing. The problem is that Bromates runs out of narrative steam. It's more like a collection of skits than a cohesive story."
