= Micah Stock =

American actor (born 1988)

- Born: December 31, 1988 (age 37); Dayton, Ohio, U.S.
- Education: State University of New York, Purchase (BFA)
- Partner: Alexandra Templer (2022-present)

Micah Stock (born December 31, 1988) is an American actor best known for his roles in the Sundance breakout Brittany Runs a Marathon, as Doug in Netflix’s Bonding and as Kevin in the FX original series Kindred.

== Early life ==
Stock was born and grew up in Dayton, Ohio. He is a graduate of the Conservatory of Theater Arts and Film at the State University of New York at Purchase and was a classmate of Zoe Kravitz and Chris Perfetti.

== Career ==
In 2021, Stock landed a starring role opposite Jon Hamm and Tina Fey in the John Slattery-directed independent feature Maggie Moore(s).

The National Geographic Channel announced in 2019 that Stock would appear as one of the original Mercury Seven astronauts, Donald K. "Deke" Slayton, in the Disney+ television series The Right Stuff.

He is known for his collaborations with playwright Terrence McNally including And Away We Go Off-Broadway and It's Only a Play on Broadway; the latter of which he was nominated for a Tony Award for Best Featured Actor in a Play. He received a 2015 Theatre World Award for an outstanding debut in a Broadway show.

== Acting credits ==
=== Film ===
Year	Title	Role	Notes
2012	King Kelly	Josh	
2017	Newly Single	Shane	
2018	Life Itself	Barista	
2018	Terrence McNally: Every Act of Life	—N/a	Documentary
2019	Brittany Runs a Marathon	Seth	
2023	Maggie Moore(s)	Jay Moore	

=== Television ===
Year	Title	Role	Notes
2011	Pan Am	Lareau	Episode: "The Genuine Article"
2012	Law & Order: SVU	Goat Mask Actor	Episode: "Theatre Tricks"
2013	Deception	Reed Philbin	3 episodes
2018	Escape at Dannemora	Kenny Mitchell	2 episodes
2018	Compliance	Marcus	Television film
2018–2021	Bonding	Doug	14 episodes
2020	Tales of the City	Jonah	Episode: "Next Level Sh*t"
2020	Amazing Stories	Jake Taylor	Episode: "The Cellar"
2020	The Right Stuff	Deke Slayton	8 episodes
2022	Kindred	Kevin Franklin	8 episodes
2025	English Teacher	Gil	Episode: "Grant's Dinner Party"

=== Theater ===
Year	Title	Role	Venue	Ref.
2014	It's Only a Play	Gus P. Head	Gerald Schoenfeld Theater, Broadway	
2016	The Front Page	Woodenshoes Eichorn	Broadhurst Theater, Broadway	
2025	Little Bear Ridge Road	Ethan	Booth Theatre, Broadway	

== Awards and nominations ==
Year	Association	Category	Project	Result	Ref.
2015	Theater World Awards	Distinguished Performance	It's Only a Play	Won	
2015	Tony Award	Best Featured Actor in a Play	It's Only a Play	Nominated	
