= Summer Days, Summer Nights =

- Official poster
- Directed by: Edward Burns
- Written by: Edward Burns
- Produced by: Edward Burns; Aaron Lubin
- Starring: Pico Alexander; Edward Burns; Zoe Levin; Susan Misner; Lindsey Morgan; Anthony Ramos; Jon Rudnitsky; Amadeus Serafini; Caitlin Stasey; Rita Volk
- Cinematography: William Rexer
- Edited by: Timothy Feeley
- Production companies: Achates Film Partners; Harbor Pucture Company
- Distributed by: American International Pictures (through United Artists Releasing; latter uncredited)
- Release dates: April 27, 2018 (Tribeca); August 24, 2021 (United States)
- Running time: 124 minutes
- Country: United States
- Language: English

Summer Days, Summer Nights (originally titled Summertime) is a 2018 American comedy-drama film, written, directed, and produced by Edward Burns. It stars Pico Alexander, Burns, Zoe Levin, Susan Misner, Lindsey Morgan, Anthony Ramos, Jon Rudnitsky, Amadeus Serafini, Caitlin Stasey and Rita Volk.

It had its world premiere at the Tribeca Film Festival on April 27, 2018. It was released on August 24, 2021, by American International Pictures.

== Plot ==
On Memorial Day weekend 1982, in a working-class beach town on Long Island, JJ Flynn has just graduated high school and is spending his summer working at the beach club run by his father Jack, who expects his son to pull his weight; JJ, however, is restless. He senses the summer might mark a turning point.

At the club, JJ meets Debbie Espinoza, a worker there who is confident, sharp and ambitious in her own right. JJ is drawn to her, but he's shy and uncertain; their budding attraction is tentative: Debbie has her own sense of self, and JJ must reconcile his expectations with this new possibility. Over the course of summer they spend time together and JJ starts to open up to the idea that life could be more than what he's been doing.

Meanwhile, Frankie returns to his hometown after some time away and reconnects with Suzy Denner, his high-school flame. JJ's cousin Terry, a wannabe musician-songwriter staying with the family, tries to convince Winky — the teenage daughter of Claudia, who runs the nearby marina — to collaborate and to believe in her own potential. Mello, a boisterous, fun-loving local married to Lydia, becomes a confidant, narrator-type figure: he loiters around the boardwalk, invites people into his orbit, his energetic personality providing a wide-angle view of the community at play.

By Labor Day weekend, the feeling of “something ending” kicks in. The parties get smaller, the jobs wind down, the tourists leave, and the beach town begins its slow return to off-season normalcy. The characters must confront the fact that “summer” is not forever: they'll all have to move on. For Suzy and Frankie, the relationship seems to reach an inflection: they either reconcile more honestly or accept that they've grown apart. For JJ and Debbie, the question remains whether what they have can extend beyond the sand and sun. For Winky, Terry and the others, it's whether they will take the next step (musician, student, adult) or stay in the place they know.

In the closing scenes, the camera pulls back. The summer jobs end, Jack Flynn's club closes up for the season, the beach chairs are folded, and the characters scatter—some staying in town, some heading to new cities, some simply pausing to ask: what's next?

== Cast ==
- Pico Alexander as JJ Flynn
- Edward Burns as Jack Flynn
- Zoe Levin as Lydia
- Susan Misner as Claudia Mckenna
- Lindsey Morgan as Debbie Espinoza
- Anthony Ramos as Frankie
- Jon Rudnitsky as Mello
- Amadeus Serafini as Terry
- Caitlin Stasey as Suzy Denner
- Rita Volk as Winky
- Carly Brooke as Pam

== Production ==
In May 2017, Rita Volk, Caitlin Stasey, Lindsey Morgan and Zoe Levin joined the cast of the film, with Edward Burns directing and producing from a screenplay he wrote. In June 2017, Pico Alexander, Amadeus Serafini, Jon Rudnitsky, Carly Brooke and Anthony Ramos were announced to star in the film.

== Release ==
The film had its world premiere at the Tribeca Film Festival on April 27, 2018. It was released on August 24, 2021, by American International Pictures.

== Reception ==
Sheila O'Malley, writing for RogerEbert.com, gave the film three out of four stars, calling the film "confident" and "unsentimental," concluding that she "grew up in a beach town like this. Burns gets it right."
