= Todd Garner =

American film producer and television producer

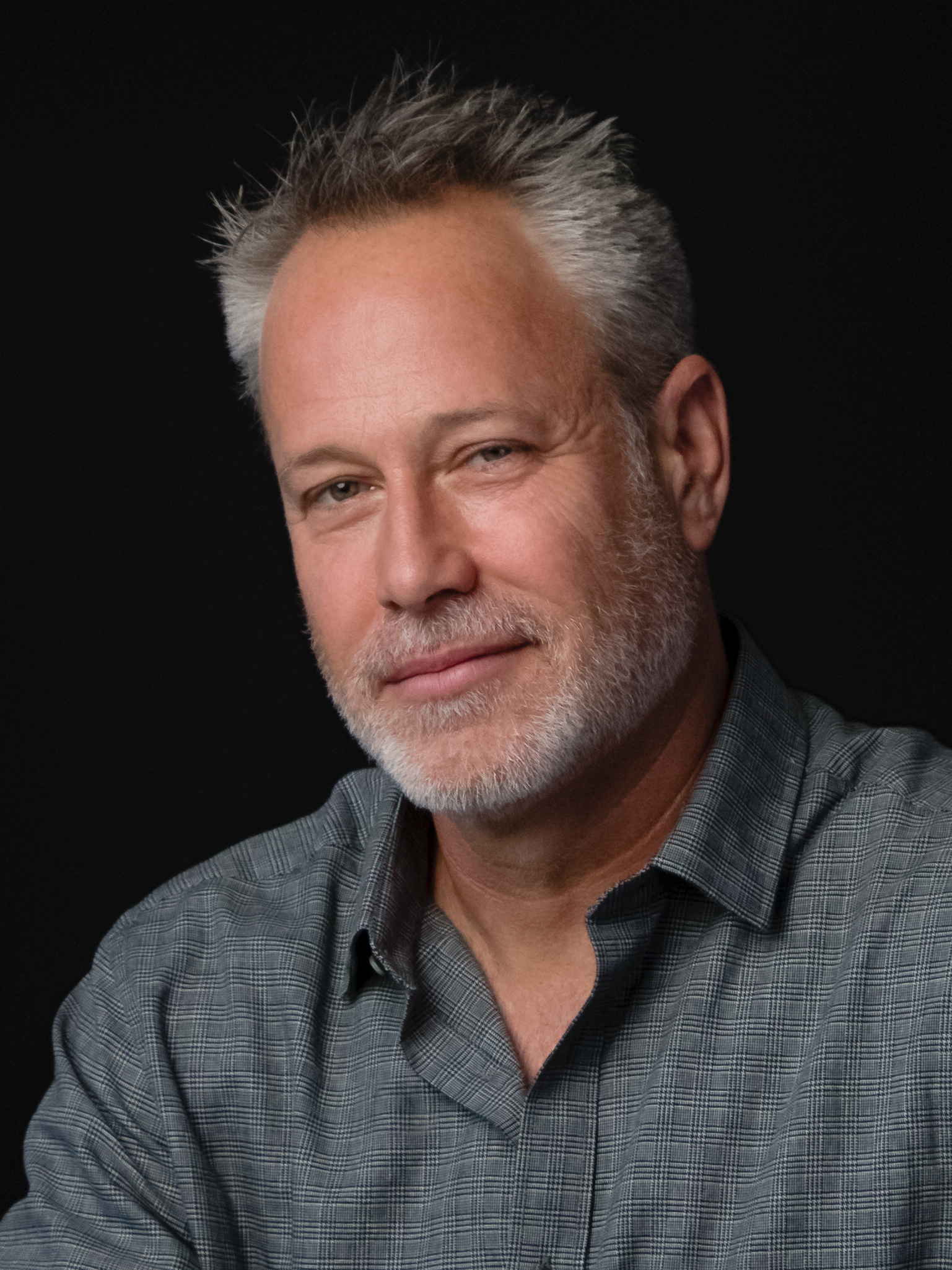
Garner in 2017

Todd Garner is an American film producer and is the founder and head of Broken Road Productions.

== Biography ==
Garner is a former Disney executive, and was formerly co-president of production at Disney. In 2000, he signed a deal with Revolution Studios to produce films with Sony Pictures, including Anger Management (2003), 13 Going on 30 (2004) and XXX (2002). Garner partnered in 2016 with Covert Media to produce two to four films a year. In 2005, Garner founded his production company -- Broken Road Productions -- and signed a first-look deal with Paramount in 2018.

Garner currently hosts The Producer's Guide: Todd Garner & Hollywood's Elite, which takes an in-depth look at the movie business and what it takes to be a producer in today's world.

Garner produced the films Paul Blart: Mall Cop, Here Comes the Boom, Zookeeper, and Paul Blart: Mall Cop 2, all of which starred Kevin James, as well as the horror films The Possession of Hannah Grace and Scouts Guide to the Zombie Apocalypse.

Garner produced Senior Year in 2022 for Netflix, along with producers Rebel Wilson, Timothy M. Bourne and Chris Bender.

== Filmography ==
Garner acted as producer in all films unless otherwise noted:

=== Film ===
Year	Film	Credit	Ref.
2001	The Animal		
2001	Tomcats	Executive producer	
2001	The One	Executive producer	
2002	The New Guy		
2002	The Master of Disguise		
2002	XXX	Executive producer	
2003	Anger Management	Executive producer	
2003	Radio	Executive producer	
2004	13 Going on 30	Executive producer	
2004	The Forgotten	Executive producer	
2005	Are We There Yet?	Executive producer	
2005	Man of the House		
2005	XXX: State of the Union	Executive producer	
2005	The Fog	Executive producer	
2006	Zoom		
2007	Are We Done Yet?		
2007	Next		
2009	Paul Blart: Mall Cop		
2010	Knight and Day		
2010	The Sorcerer's Apprentice	Executive producer	
2011	Zookeeper		
2011	Jack and Jill		
2012	Here Comes the Boom		
2014	Into the Storm		
2015	Paul Blart: Mall Cop 2		
2015	Scouts Guide to the Zombie Apocalypse		
2016	True Memoirs of an International Assassin		
2017	Naked		
2018	Tag		
2018	The Possession of Hannah Grace		
2019	Isn't It Romantic		
2019	Haunt		
2019	Playing with Fire		
2020	All My Life		
2021	Mortal Kombat		
2021	Vacation Friends		
2022	Senior Year		
2023	Vacation Friends 2		
2024	Reunion		
2024	Incoming		
2026	Mortal Kombat II		
2026	Runner		
TBA	All of Me		
TBA	An American Werewolf in London		
TBA	Sleepy Hollow		

Miscellaneous crew

Year	Film	Role
1996	The Rock	Production executive
1997	Con Air	Production executive
1997	Face/Off	Production executive
1998	Snake Eyes	Production executive
1998	The Waterboy	Production executive
2000	O Brother, Where Art Thou?	Production executive
2000	Gone in 60 Seconds	Production executive
2001	Pearl Harbor	Production executive
2001	Black Hawk Down	Production executive
2004	Hellboy	Production executive

As an actor

Year	Film	Role
2015	Paul Blart: Mall Cop 2	Father of Little Girl

Thanks

Year	Film	Role
2002	Punch-Drunk Love	Special thanks
2018	A Boy Called Sailboat	Very special thanks

=== Television ===
Year	Title	Credit	Notes
2006	Split Decision		Television pilot
2014	Snack Off	Executive producer	
2020	The Cabin with Bert Kreischer	Executive producer	
2021	The Crew	Executive producer	
2022	Sins of Our Mother	Executive producer	Documentary

As writer

Year	Title
2014	Snack Off
