= Brittany Runs a Marathon =

2019 film by Paul Downs Colaizzo

- Theatrical release poster
- Directed by: Paul Downs Colaizzo
- Written by: Paul Downs Colaizzo
- Produced by: Matthew Plouffe; Tobey Maguire; Margot Hand
- Starring: Jillian Bell; Michaela Watkins; Utkarsh Ambudkar; Lil Rel Howery; Micah Stock
- Cinematography: Seamus Tierney
- Edited by: Casey Brooks
- Music by: Duncan Thum
- Production companies: Material Pictures; Picture Films
- Distributed by: Amazon Studios
- Release dates: January 28, 2019 (Sundance); August 23, 2019 (United States)
- Running time: 103 minutes
- Country: United States
- Language: English
- Box office: $7.4 million

Brittany Runs a Marathon is a 2019 American comedy film written and directed by Paul Downs Colaizzo, in his directorial debut. It stars Jillian Bell, Michaela Watkins, Utkarsh Ambudkar, Lil Rel Howery, and Micah Stock. The film follows an overweight woman in New York City who sets out to lose weight and train for the city's annual marathon.

It had its world premiere at the Sundance Film Festival on January 28, 2019, and was released on August 23, 2019, by Amazon Studios.

== Plot ==
Brittany Forgler is a 28-year-old living in NYC, employed as a greeter at an off-Broadway theater. She and her roommate Gretchen, a teacher's assistant dreaming of social media fame, are hard partiers who abuse drugs. Visiting a new doctor to score an Adderall prescription, Brittany receives the unwelcome diagnosis that she is overweight and must get healthier.

Brittany visits a gym only to find even the cheapest membership fee is out of her reach. Despite her fear, she sets small achievable goals, and tries running on her own outdoors. She is invited to run in a group with her neighbor Catherine, whom Brittany detests for her seemingly perfect life.

After another night of partying with Gretchen, Brittany joins the group run and meets Seth, another struggling runner, learning they have equal goals. Brittany, Seth, and Catherine bond and, after a 5K run, set the ultimate goal: running in the New York City Marathon.

Brittany seeks a second job to afford a gym membership and becomes a pet sitter in a wealthy home. On her first day, she meets fellow pet sitter Jern, who is essentially living in the house against the rules. After a falling out with Gretchen over her changing lifestyle, Brittany moves into the house as well, bonding with Jern over their stalled lives. Seth and Catherine's predictions that Brittany will have sex and fall in love with Jern eventually come true.

Brittany gets within five pounds of her goal of losing 45 pounds. Unable to win a place in the marathon through a lottery as Seth does, her only hope is to raise enough money for a charity. At Catherine's divorce party, Catherine offers to donate $5000 from her family trust and from Seth so Brittany can run in the marathon. Brittany turns down the offer, saying she does not want pity, and she leaves.

Brittany pushes to lose more weight by running even harder, until one of her shins becomes too painful to walk on. Five weeks from the marathon, her doctor informs her she has a stress fracture and will be unable to run for six to eight weeks, and the damage may be permanent.

Distraught, convinced she will gain back her weight, Brittany returns to the dog-sitting house and discusses the state of her life with Jern. The homeowners return and, disgusted Jern and Brittany have been living there, fire them.

Brittany takes a bus to Philadelphia to visit her sister Cici and brother-in-law Demetrius, who was a father figure to Brittany after their parents' divorce and father's death. She ignores calls and texts from Catherine, Seth, and Jern, saddened to see Seth and Catherine with their marathon medals. That same day, she disrupts Demetrius's birthday party by making comments about an overweight female guest due to her own insecurities. After a stern but heartfelt talk with Demetrius, Brittany returns to New York and her former apartment, now alone.

Brittany continues exercising but stops tracking her weight. She applies for advertising jobs, for which she trained initially, and lands an entry-level position in Tribeca. She reconnects with her friends.

Catherine reveals that running was a distraction from her nasty divorce, explaining that a year ago, she broke her wrist and was prescribed Oxycodone; her husband used it as evidence she had relapsed into drug use, and the court denied her visitation rights to their children. Brittany encourages Catherine to take small steps to win her children back. Brittany sets boundaries with Jern to just be friends while she works on herself.

One year later, Brittany runs in the marathon. At the 22-mile mark, she develops a cramp and has to pause. She rejects medical assistance, but accepts an assistant's offer to help her up. While considering quitting, she finds Seth, his husband and sons, and Catherine in the crowd cheering her on. She also encounters Jern, who says he loves her. She then keeps going and finishes the marathon.

An epilogue reveals Brittany and Jern living together as a couple, but she does not want to marry him despite his suggestion. She kisses him and leaves the house to go on a run.

== Cast ==
- Jillian Bell as Brittany Forgler
- Michaela Watkins as Catherine
- Utkarsh Ambudkar as Jern Dahn
- Lil Rel Howery as Demetrius
- Micah Stock as Seth
- Alice Lee as Gretchen
- Jennifer Dundas as Shannon
- Patch Darragh as Doctor Falloway
- Peter Vack as Ryan
- Kate Arrington as CiCi Fogler
- Juri Henley-Cohn as David
- Adam Sietz as Glenn
- Mikey Day as Dev
- Max Pava as Drunk Guy

== Production ==
The story of Brittany was inspired by Colaizzo's roommate, Brittany O'Neill, who appears in photos before the end credits. The real life Brittany did not lose her parents at a young age, and had a more stable job than the character in the film. Colaizzo wanted to emphasize the inspirational side of the story and take what would usually be treated as a fat sidekick stock character and instead explore her feelings and perspective. The real life Brittany had gotten into running but it was after Colaizzo came up with the film concept that she was inspired to try the take on the New York marathon herself. Tobey Maguire's production company Material Pictures, picked up the film based on the oral pitch. Colaizzo had never had a screenplay turned into a film before and was worried that without his involvement the film might change into something more generic. He put together a presentation and storyboards of how the film should look and convinced producers to allow him to direct his first feature film.

In November 2017, it was announced Jillian Bell, Michaela Watkins, Utkarsh Ambudkar, Lil Rel Howery, Micah Stock and Alice Lee would star in the film, with Paul Downs Colaizzo directing from a screenplay he wrote. Tobey Maguire, Matthew Plouffe, Margot Hand, served as producers on the film, under their Material Pictures and Picture Films banners, respectively. Bell, Downs Colaizzo, and Richard Weinberg served as executive producers. Jolian Blevins and Padraic Murphy served as co-producer and associate producer, respectively.

=== Filming ===
The film was the first non-documentary film to be shot at the New York Marathon. The production company went to the New York Road Runners, organizers of the marathon, to coordinate filming and to make sure that they did not get in the way of runners. Crew sizes were restricted and the film makers were not allowed to film on the Queensboro Bridge due to security concerns from the Department of Homeland Security. The film had no budget for visual effects to insert Bell into the race and depended on filming the marathon for real.

Principal photography began in October 2017, in New York City. The film was shot over 29 days. The climactic scene was filmed during the 2017 New York City Marathon, with three filming crews working simultaneously to cover various stages of the race.

== Release ==
It had its world premiere at the Sundance Film Festival on January 28, 2019. Shortly after, Amazon Studios acquired worldwide distribution rights to the film for $14 million. It was released on August 23, 2019.

== Reception ==
=== Box office ===
The film made $175,969 from five theaters in its opening weekend, an average of $35,194 per venue. The final worldwide box office gross was $7.4 million.

=== Critical response ===
On Rotten Tomatoes, the film had an approval rating of 89% based on 191 reviews, with an average rating of 7.3/10. The site's critical consensus reads, "Brittany Runs a Marathon is an earnest and hilarious dramedy that finally gives Jillian Bell a role worthy of her gifts." On Metacritic, the film had a weighted average score of 72 out of 100, based on reviews from 33 critics, indicating "generally favorable" reviews.

Dennis Harvey of Variety wrote, "This terrifically engaging debut feature by playwright Paul Downs Colaizzo is the best kind of "crowdpleaser": one that earns every emotional beat that might seem formulaic in four out of five similar enterprises."

=== Accolades ===
| Award (Note: Awards, festivals and organizations are in Alphabetical order.) | Date of ceremony (Note: Date is linked to the article about the awards held that year, wherever possible.) | Category | Recipient(s) | Result | Ref. |
|---|---|---|---|---|---|
| Casting Society of America | January 30, 2020 | Studio or Independent – Comedy | Brittany Runs a Marathon | Nominated | |
| GLAAD Media Award | July 30, 2020 | Outstanding Film – Limited Release | Brittany Runs a Marathon | Nominated | |
| Hollywood Critics Association | January 9, 2020 | Best First Feature | Brittany Runs a Marathon | Nominated | |
| São Paulo International Film Festival | October 30, 2019 | Best Film | Brittany Runs a Marathon | Nominated | |
| Satellite Awards | March 1, 2020 | Best Television Film | Brittany Runs a Marathon | Nominated | |
| Sundance Film Festival | January 24 - February 3, 2019 | The Audience Award: U.S. Dramatic | Brittany Runs a Marathon | Won | |
| Sundance Film Festival | January 24 - February 3, 2019 | Grand Jury Prize | Brittany Runs a Marathon | Nominated | |
