= Bonding (TV series) =

American Netflix comedy-drama series

- Genre: Dark comedy; Comedy drama; Sex comedy
- Created by: Rightor Doyle
- Directed by: Rightor Doyle
- Starring: Zoe Levin; Brendan Scannell; Micah Stock; Theo Stockman; Nana Mensah
- Composer: Adam Crystal
- Country of origin: United States
- Original language: English
- No. of seasons: 2
- No. of episodes: 15

Production
- Executive producers: Rightor Doyle; Dara Gordon; Jacob Perlin; Nina Soriano; David Sigurani (season 1); Tony Hernandez (season 2); John Skidmore (season 2); Patrick Holzman (season 2)
- Producers: Jesse Schiller (season 1); Jake Fuller (season 2); Ryan McCormick (season 2)
- Cinematography: Nate Hurtsellers
- Editors: Patrick Lawrence; Mike S. Smith
- Camera setup: Single-camera
- Running time: 13–17 minutes
- Production companies: Blackpills; Anonymous Content; Jax Media (season 2); Rightor Doyle Productions (season 2)

Original release
- Network: Netflix
- Release: April 24, 2019 – January 27, 2021

Bonding (stylized as BONDiNG) is an American dark comedy television series that premiered on Netflix on April 24, 2019. The series stars Zoe Levin, Brendan Scannell, Micah Stock, Theo Stockman, and Nana Mensah. On January 16, 2020, the series was renewed for a second season which was released on January 27, 2021.

Bonding is reported to be loosely based on the personal experience of creator Rightor Doyle. In July 2021, the series was canceled after two seasons.

== Synopsis ==
Tiffany "Tiff" Chester (Zoe Levin) is a psychology student moonlighting as a dominatrix. She enlists the help of Pete Devin (Brendan Scannell), her best friend from high school who is gay, to be her assistant. The semi-estranged characters reconnect in Manhattan, where Pete works as a waiter and as an aspiring stand-up comedian with stage fright. Tiff struggles as she balances her personal life with school and her job, as well as Pete's exposure to sadomasochism and BDSM and how it gradually helps him become liberated in his life.

== Cast and characters ==
=== Main ===
- Zoe Levin as Tiffany "Tiff" Chester, a psychology grad student living in New York City. She works as dominatrix by night under the alias "Mistress May". She enlists the help of Pete to become her assistant.
- Brendan Scannell as Peter "Pete" Devin, a young gay man who becomes an assistant to Tiff. He initially chooses the alias "Carter", but is later referred to as "Master Carter".
- Micah Stock as Doug (season 2, recurring season 1), Tiff's psychology classmate, with whom she later begins a relationship
- Theo Stockman as Josh (season 2, recurring season 1), Pete's boyfriend
- Nana Mensah as Mistress Mira (season 2), Tiff's former mentor

=== Recurring ===
- Matthew Wilkas as Rolph, Tiff's German man-servant and one of her clients
- Alex Hurt as Frank, Pete's roommate
- Gabrielle Ryan as Portia, Frank's girlfriend
- Alysha Umphress as Murphy, a stand-up comedian and Pete's friend
- Kevin Kane as Professor Charles (season 1), Tiff's psychology professor
- Stephanie Styles as Kate (season 1)
- Charles Gould as Fred, one of Tiff's clients

=== Guest ===
- Jade Elysan as Cat Dom (season 1)
- Stephen Reich as Trevor (season 1)
- D'Arcy Carden as Daphne (season 1)
- Amy Bettina as Chelsea
- Eric Berryman as Andy (season 1), Daphne's husband
- Kevin Kilner as MJP (season 2)
- Nico Evers-Swindell as Martin (season 2)

== Episodes ==
Season	Episodes	Originally released
1	7	April 24, 2019
2	8	January 27, 2021

=== Season 1 (2019) ===
No. overall	No. in season	Title	Directed by	Written by	Original release date
1	1	"Old Friends, New Names"	Rightor Doyle	Rightor Doyle	April 24, 2019
In need of money to pay rent, Pete reluctantly decides to become an assistant to a dominatrix, his best friend from high school Tiffany Chester, who goes by the alias Mistress May. He chooses the alias Carter as her new assistant.
2	2	"Pete Shy"	Rightor Doyle	Rightor Doyle	April 24, 2019
Pete struggles to find the confidence to perform onstage as a stand-up comedian. At work as a waiter, a customer named Josh leaves his number for Pete on a receipt. Meanwhile, Tiff meets with potential new client Daphne, who is looking to hire Tiff for her husband Andy.
3	3	"The Past Is Not Always Behind"	Rightor Doyle	Rightor Doyle	April 24, 2019
Pete decides to tell his roommate Frank about his new job as a dominatrix's assistant, leading Frank to ask for an odd favor. Tiff begins to see one of her classmates, Doug, in a new light during a class presentation. Pete and Tiff run into Chelsea, an obnoxious former high school classmate, at a bar. It is later revealed that Pete lost his virginity to Tiff in high school.
4	4	"Let's Get Physical"	Rightor Doyle	Rightor Doyle	April 24, 2019
Tiff enacts the sexual pleasure of tickling Daphne's husband, Andy, while Pete allows Daphne to punch him to let out her frustration. Pete goes on a date with Josh, which starts off bad but becomes better after the two grab coffee. Tiff beats up her sleazy psychology professor after witnessing him being inappropriate with Kate, a classmate.
5	5	"Double Date"	Rightor Doyle	Rightor Doyle	April 24, 2019
Tiff gets into an argument with Pete, in which he states that she always feels the need to be in control. Pete goes on another date with Josh. Doug and Tiff go on a date/non-date. However, Tiff's client/German man-servant, Rolph, unexpectedly shows up and ruins the date. Meanwhile, Pete and Josh end up having sex at Pete's apartment.
6	6	"Penguins"	Rightor Doyle	Rightor Doyle	April 24, 2019
Pete is left entertaining a client while wearing a penguin costume after Tiff fails to show up to work. Tiff reveals to Doug that she is a dominatrix. Pete finally goes on stage, as his "Master Carter" persona. Meanwhile, Tiff does her thesis presentation in front of the class dressed as her dominatrix persona.
7	7	"Into the Woods"	Rightor Doyle	Rightor Doyle	April 24, 2019
Tiff visits Daphne and Andy again, without Pete. Tiff and Pete finally apologize to each other. A flashback shows Pete and Tiff on their prom night. Tiff and Pete visit the house of a new client, Trevor, who attacks Tiff after locking Pete in the bathroom. Tiff stabs Trevor in the leg after Pete gets out of the bathroom. The two flee together, after police sirens are heard.

=== Season 2 (2021) ===
No. overall	No. in season	Title	Directed by	Written by	Original release date
8	1	"The Kinks"	Rightor Doyle	Rightor Doyle	January 27, 2021
Ten months after their disastrous house call, Tiff and Pete's reputation is still trashed, so they seek help from Tiff's former mentor.
9	2	"Dog Days"	Rightor Doyle	Rightor Doyle & Olivia Troy	January 27, 2021
A jealous Tiff accidentally calls Doug her boyfriend. Pete tries to be understanding with Josh—and embraces his submissive side.
10	3	"Personal"	Rightor Doyle	Rightor Doyle & Nana Mensah	January 27, 2021
As a test, Mistress Mira sends Tiff and Pete to work with her personal submissive, who enjoys being financially dominated. Doug opens up to Tiff.
11	4	"Threesomes"	Rightor Doyle	Rightor Doyle	January 27, 2021
Frank lands a job as a stripper at a gay bar. Thrown together, Tiff and Gina bond. Pete meets Josh's ex, who bears an uncanny resemblance to Pete.
12	5	"Nanci"	Rightor Doyle	Rightor Doyle & Nana Mensah	January 27, 2021
With Pete's support, Josh says he is ready to come out to his father and co-workers. Tiff helps Chelsea conquer her fears.
13	6	"The Lost Egg"	Rightor Doyle	Rightor Doyle & Olivia Troy	January 27, 2021
Tiff tells Pete they need to quit working together. Doug's frustrations with Tiff boil over, and Pete prepares to meet Josh's father.
14	7	"Stand Me Up, Stand Me Down"	Rightor Doyle	Rightor Doyle	January 27, 2021
Blowups with Tiff and Josh leave Pete feeling crushed. And now he has to do a stand-up set with an agent in the audience.
15	8	"Permission"	Rightor Doyle	Rightor Doyle	January 27, 2021
As their friendship falters and their paths diverge, Tiff and Pete navigate permission, consent, betrayal—and new opportunities.

== Production ==
=== Development ===
On December 14, 2018, Netflix announced it had picked up the series for a seven-episode first season. The series is created by Rightor Doyle, who is credited as an executive producer, alongside Dara Gordon, Jacob Perlin, Nina Soriano, Tom Schembri and David Sigurani. Production companies involved with the series include Blackpills and Anonymous Content. On January 16, 2020, Netflix renewed the series for a second season consisting of eight-episodes. On July 2, 2021, Netflix canceled the series after two seasons.

=== Casting ===
After Netflix acquired the series, it was confirmed that Zoe Levin and Brendan Scannell would star in the series.

== Release ==
On April 22, 2019, Netflix released the official trailer for the series.

== Reception ==
On review aggregator Rotten Tomatoes, the first season holds an approval rating of 71% with an average rating of 6.95/10 based on 14 reviews. The website's consensus reads: "Though Bonding's juicy spin on friendship and sexuality boldly treads into uncharted territory, the show's writing too often teeters uncomfortably between bewitchingly funny and bewilderingly underwhelming to make it a truly satisfying experience."

On Rotten Tomatoes, the second season has three positive reviews and no negative reviews. Daniel Hart of Ready Steady Cut described the second season as "more fruitful and more emotional" and wrote: "while the previous instalment gave it a larger dose of comedy, there's more respect for the community's work in this season; there's an understanding that the world of dominatrix fulfils the pleasure of many that it is not just a space for whips and leather". Jess Joho of Mashable said that the second season "stands out for focusing far less on the leather of it all, and far more on the underlying emotional connection, vulnerability, communication, and boundary-setting that can make ethical BDSM an incredible vehicle for deepening relationships".

=== Accolades ===
Year	Award	Category	Nominee(s)	Result	Ref.
2021	Primetime Emmy Awards	Outstanding Actor in a Short Form Comedy or Drama Series	Brendan Scannell	Nominated	

=== Controversy ===
After the release of the first season, the series suffered several criticisms by the BDSM community for containing a high level of inaccuracy. According to BDSM workers, the series' humor revolves around mistaken stereotypes and does not accurately portray the reality of BDSM.

BDSM experts characterize Tiff as cold and aggressive, not knowing how to separate the dominatrix personality from the everyday personality. In addition, the series attempts to use a history of sexual trauma to justify Tiff's preference for domination fetishes, a view that is considered clichéd and misguided about sex workers. The lack of negotiation and consent in several scenes in the first season and the collar with "Ring of O", a symbol of BDSM submission, being used by the protagonist are also other problems pointed out by BDSM professionals.

Shortly after the first season's release, one of the series' creators, Rightor Doyle, responded to negative criticism by stating that he would listen to the BDSM community to fix the inaccuracies shown in the series so far. With that, they hired as consultant Olivia Troy, a writer who has worked with BDSM for 15 years, to assist them in the script for the second season. This caused most of the negative points pointed out in the first season to be corrected, making the series closer to the reality of BDSM.

According to Troy, the lack of consent, communication and connection between dominatrix and submissive is one of the main mistakes made by the media when BDSM is addressed. Despite the evolution of the second season, Troy also states that there are still some moments that are not necessarily realistic because the theme must fit into the style and script of the show.

Actress Zoe Levin said she initially accepted the role not knowing how the work of a dominatrix really is. After seeing all the negative reviews the series received in the first season, she went with consultant Olivia Troy to BDSM studios to learn about the equipment, philosophy and ethical principles adopted by the BDSM community. When asked what message the second season brings to the audience, Levin said "the hope is that they see BDSM and sex work and bondage in a different light than they normally do. Because, what we have seen in TV and film is the very stereotypical version of what we only think BDSM is."
