= Theo Stockman =

American actor and singer (born 1984)

- Born: December 27, 1984 (age 41); Brookline, Massachusetts, U.S.
- Other name: "Firecracker" “Crestor” “Theo Von”
- Occupations: Actor; singer; disc jockey
- Years active: 2007–present
- Website: www.theostockman.com

Theo Stockman (born December 27, 1984) is an American actor, singer, and DJ, known for his roles in Broadway musicals such as Hair, American Idiot, and American Psycho, numerous roles on television including Alaska Daily, Inside Amy Schumer, High Maintenance, Private Practice, The Following, Shades of Blue, Law & Order: Special Victims Unit, and for his role in Stephen King's A Good Marriage. He plays the recurring characters of Josh on Netflix's Bonding and Jacob on Apple TV's WeCrashed.

== Early life ==
Stockman is the son of author Jayne Anne Phillips and physician Mark Stockman. He graduated from Concord Academy in 2003. While there, he was an active member of the theatre program, performing as Nick Bottom in A Midsummer Night's Dream and multiple characters in The Laramie Project, as well as being a founding member of the Lizard Husbandry Club, in honor of the school’s chameleon mascot. In his senior year of high school, Stockman adapted The Perks of Being a Wallflower for the stage and directed it as part of the academy's Directors Seminar.

Stockman graduated from New York University's Tisch School of the Arts with a Bachelor of Fine Arts in drama in 2007, after studying at the Stella Adler Studio of Acting, the Experimental Theatre Wing, and the International Theatre Workshop in Amsterdam. He portrayed Claude Bukowski in a "no hair" production of the musical Hair, where all cast members sported shaved heads. In 2007, Stockman played Dionysus in The Bacchae at the International Theatre Festival in Warsaw, for which he was awarded Best Lead Actor.

== Career ==
Stockman was an original cast member in the Tony Award-winning 2009 Broadway revival of Hair, performing as a Member of the Tribe and as the characters Hubert, the Nazi Principal, and John Wilkes Booth. He performed in the 40th anniversary concert production at the Delacorte Theater, followed by the revival at the Delacorte Theater in Central Park. He then transferred with the show to Broadway.

Stockman then starred as The Representative of Jingletown in American Idiot on Broadway, after appearing in workshops and the original Berkeley run. American Idiot premiered at the Berkeley Repertory Theatre on September 4, 2009, and transferred to the St. James Theatre on Broadway, where it opened on April 20, 2010. Stockman left the show on January 30, 2011.

In 2012, Stockman starred as Danny Mueller in the Off-Broadway play An Early History of Fire by David Rabe, produced by The New Group.

In June 2013, he joined the cast of Peter Askin's film adaptation of Stephen King's novella A Good Marriage, portraying Donnie Anderson.

Stockman returned to Broadway in 2016, playing the role of Timothy Price in the musical American Psycho, written by Duncan Sheik and Roberto Aguirre-Sacasa.

Stockman starred as Steve Rubell in This Ain't No Disco at the Atlantic Theater Company, written by Stephen Trask (Hedwig and the Angry Inch) and Peter Yanowitz (The Wallflowers). The world premiere musical ran Off-Broadway, summer 2018. He recently starred as the villainous Ashby Givens in the world premiere 2022 musical Black No More at The New Group, written by Black Thought and John Ridley.

Stockman plays Pete's boyfriend Josh in both seasons of the Netflix original series Bonding, written and directed by Rightor Doyle.

Most recently, he can be seen as the recurring character of Jacob on Apple TV+'s WeCrashed, opposite Jared Leto and Anne Hathaway. Stockman also plays suspect Ezra Fisher on Alaska Daily on ABC, starring Hilary Swank.

On stage, Stockman most recently played Caliban in the Public Works Public Theater production of William Shakespeare's The Tempest at the Delacorte Theatre, opposite Renée Elise Goldsberry.

On television, Stockman most recently guest starred on Only Murders In The Building, opposite Meryl Streep & Martin Short.

== Filmography ==
=== Film ===
Year	Title	Role	Notes
2013	Home	Charles	
2014	And So It Goes	Pet Store Employee	
2014	A Good Marriage	Donnie Anderson	
2017	The Boy Downstairs	Eliot	

=== Television ===
Year	Title	Role	Notes
2009	30 Rock	Ephraim	Episode: "Apollo, Apollo"
2009	Cupid	DJ	Episode: "Shipping Out"
2011	Nurse Jackie	Kyle Finch	Episode: "Fuck the Lemurs"
2011	CSI: Crime Scene Investigation	Slade	Episode: "Bittersweet"
2011	Private Practice	Wes	Episode: "Step One"
2012	Blue Bloods	Timothy Abbey	Episode: "Parenthood"
2012	I Just Want My Pants Back	Greg	Episode: "Love Equation"
2012	Made in Jersey	Micah Schraft	Episode: "The Farm"
2013	High Maintenance	Thomas	Episode: "Elijah"
2013–2015	Inside Amy Schumer	Tim / Conor	2 episodes
2014	The Following	Patrick	Episode: "Teacher's Pet"
2014	Olive Kitteridge	Sean O'Casey	Episode: "Security"
2016	Shades of Blue	Officer Hollister	Episode: "Good Cop, Bad Cop"
2016	Law & Order: Special Victims Unit	Michael Wheeler	Episode: "Heightened Emotions"
2018–2021	Bonding	Josh	11 episodes
2022	WeCrashed	Jacob	7 episodes
2022–2023	Alaska Daily	Ezra Fisher	2 episodes

== Stage ==
Year	Title	Role	Location
2007–2009	Hair	Hubert	Delacorte Theater and Al Hirschfeld Theatre
2009	The Last Goodbye	Benvolio Montague	Joe's Pub
2009–2011	American Idiot	Rep of Jingletown	Berkeley Repertory Theatre and St. James Theatre
2012	An Early History of Fire	Danny Mueller	The New Group at Acorn Theater
2015–2016	American Psycho	Timothy Price	Gerald Schoenfeld Theatre
2018	This Ain't No Disco	Steve Rubell	Atlantic Theater Company
2022	Black No More	Ashby Givens	The New Group
2023	The Tempest	Gollum	Delacorte Theater
