= Vacation Friends 2 =

2023 film by Clay Tarver

- Official release poster
- Directed by: Clay Tarver
- Written by: Clay Tarver
- Based on: Characters by: Tom Mullen; Tim Mullen; Clay Tarver; Jonathan Goldstein; John Francis Daley
- Produced by: Todd Garner; Stuart M. Besser
- Starring: Lil Rel Howery; Yvonne Orji; John Cena; Meredith Hagner; Steve Buscemi; Ronny Chieng; Jamie Hector
- Cinematography: Tim Suhrstedt
- Edited by: Tim Roche
- Music by: Mark Mothersbaugh
- Production companies: 20th Century Studios; Broken Road Productions
- Distributed by: Hulu (United States); Disney+ (International)
- Release date: August 25, 2023
- Running time: 105 minutes
- Country: United States
- Language: English

Vacation Friends 2 is a 2023 American buddy comedy film written and directed by Clay Tarver. It is a sequel to Vacation Friends and stars Lil Rel Howery, John Cena, Yvonne Orji, Meredith Hagner, Steve Buscemi, Ronny Chieng, and Jamie Hector. Distributed by 20th Century Studios, the film was released on Hulu in the United States on August 25, 2023.

== Plot ==
After the events of the first film, Marcus and Emily join Ron and Kyla, along with their infant son (also named Marcus) and Maurillio - acting as a babysitter - prepare for a trip to the Caribbean. Marcus has an ulterior motive for the trip, planning to interview with Korean hotel company Kim Wae for a job to build a five-star hotel in Chicago after Ron and Kyla have left. As on their previous vacation, Ron and Kyla encourage Marcus and Emily to party excessively. The next morning, Marcus discovers that his meeting has been moved up, and the Kim Wae executives are already at the hotel ahead of company owner Mrs. Kim's arrival.

The foursome meet for drinks with Kim Wae executive Yeon, who tells Marcus he is not his first choice for the Chicago project. The event is interrupted by the unexpected arrival of Kyla's father Reese, who has just been released from San Quentin State Prison. Reese quickly clashes with Ron, who is unaccustomed to having people dislike him. Reese tells Kyla that he has an investment opportunity for a cryptocurrency called SCOM Coin. Marcus and Emily are immediately dubious, but Emily encourages Marcus to have faith in Reese.

Marcus and Ron take Reese surfing, where they see Reese meet with mysterious stranger Jerome. Marcus and Ron are goaded by Yeon and Reese, respectively, into surfing high waves; Marcus is badly injured after wiping out. At the hotel casino, Marcus forces Ron to play a drinking game, putting Kim Wae executive Minjin in the hospital. Emily is ejected after Kyla gives her card counting tips. Reese meets with drug lord Warren, and makes a deal to recover Warren's downed plane. Warren threatens to kill Reese, but is interrupted by Marcus and Ron's arrival. Later, the two return a drunken Yeon to his hotel room, who endorses Marcus for the project but complains that Mrs. Kim does not value his opinion.

Reese invites the four on a snorkeling expedition as a cover for him and Jerome to retrieve five million dollars in cash from Warren's plane. As they depart, they are chased by authorities for trespassing in Cuban waters. The group manages to escape, but damage to the plane forces them to make a crash landing. Jerome escapes with a bag of money, while the rest is destroyed by the plane exploding. The crash is spotted by Warren and his men, and the five are chased and captured. Reese lies to Warren, telling him that the money was never recovered. Warren's men trap the group in a cargo container while they go to retrieve the money. Ron and Reese begin to argue, but are interrupted as the container is dropped into the water, leaving the group to drown. Ron lights a joint, using the smoke to discover a weak point and break open the container. Kyla hotwires a car to assist the escape.

The group rushes back to the hotel, chased by Warren's men, to get Marcus to his meeting. After reaching the hotel, Reese, Marcus, and Ron are held up by Warren's men, but are saved by Maurillio, who impersonates notorious drug kingpin Chencho Novar to negotiate a peace. Warren agrees to release Ron and Marcus, but demands the five million dollars be repaid for Reese's freedom. Ron agrees to pay the ransom, revealing that he took Reese's SCOM Coin tip and made millions from it. Reese is amazed at Ron's generosity and gives him and Kyla his blessing. Marcus rushes to stop a departing Mrs. Kim, but she is unwilling to hear him out after failing to make their meeting. Yeon speaks up on Marcus's behalf, winning him the job. The group celebrates, but the FBI arrives, revealing that Reese was not paroled, but in fact broke out of prison to spend time with Kyla. The rest of the group make plans for the evening, except for Ron, who plans to attend to "unfinished business" - a drinking rematch with Minjin.

== Cast ==
- Lil Rel Howery as Marcus
- Yvonne Orji as Emily
- John Cena as Ron
- Meredith Hagner as Kyla
- Steve Buscemi as Reese Hackford
- Carlos Santos as Maurillio
- Ronny Chieng as Yeon
- Jamie Hector as Warren
- Lovensky Jean-Baptiste as Jerome
- Julee Cerda as Mrs. Kim
- Kevin Yamada as Minjin

== Production ==
In April 2023, Deadline reported that a sequel to Vacation Friends was set to be released by Hulu, with the main cast returning. Principal photography took place on Oahu in Kailua, Hawaii under the working title Honeymoon Friends in late 2022.

== Release ==
Vacation Friends 2 was released on August 25, 2023 in the United States by Hulu and on Disney+ in other territories.

== Reception ==
=== Audience viewership ===
Whip Media, which tracks viewership data for the more than 25 million worldwide users of its TV Time app, calculated that Vacation Friends 2 was the third most-streamed film in the U.S. during the week of August 27, 2023. It subsequently ranked fifth during the week of September 3, 2023. Nielsen Media Research, which records streaming viewership on U.S. television screens, reported that Vacation Friends 2 was watched for 246 million minutes during the week of August 21–27, 2023.

=== Critical response ===
On the review aggregator website Rotten Tomatoes, 20% of 30 critics' reviews are positive, with an average rating of 4.3/10. Metacritic, which uses a weighted average, assigned the film a score of 38 out of 100, based on nine critics, indicating "generally unfavorable" reviews.
