= Playing with Fire (2019 film) =

2019 film directed by Andy Fickman

- Theatrical release poster
- Directed by: Andy Fickman
- Screenplay by: Dan Ewen; Matt Lieberman
- Story by: Dan Ewen
- Produced by: Todd Garner; Sean Robins
- Starring: John Cena; Keegan-Michael Key; John Leguizamo; Brianna Hildebrand; Dennis Haysbert; Judy Greer
- Cinematography: Dean Semler
- Edited by: Elísabet Ronaldsdóttir
- Music by: Nathan Wang
- Production companies: Paramount Players; Nickelodeon Movies; Walden Media; Broken Road Productions
- Distributed by: Paramount Pictures
- Release date: November 8, 2019
- Running time: 96 minutes
- Country: United States
- Language: English
- Budget: $29.9 million
- Box office: $69.4 million

Playing with Fire is a 2019 American family comedy film directed by Andy Fickman from a screenplay by Dan Ewen and Matt Lieberman based on a story by Ewen. The film stars John Cena, Keegan-Michael Key, John Leguizamo, Brianna Hildebrand, Dennis Haysbert, and Judy Greer. It tells the story of a group of smokejumpers who must watch over three children who they rescued from a burning cabin until child services arrives.

The film was theatrically released by Paramount Pictures on November 8, 2019, in the United States. Despite negative reviews from critics, the film grossed $69.4 million worldwide with a budget of $29.9 million.

== Plot ==
Superintendent Jake Carson is the commanding officer of a group of smokejumpers in the remote California woodlands. Carson is capable in a crisis and takes tremendous pride in his work, diving into dangerous situations to rescue civilians alongside his team Mark Rogers, Rodrigo Torres, and "Axe".

After rescuing three children from a burning cabin, Carson is contacted by Division Commander Richards. Richards praises his work and shortlists him to be his replacement, Carson's dream job.

Rogers warns Carson they are responsible for the children's welfare (15-year-old Brynn, 10-year-old Will, and 3-year-old (later 4-year-old) Zoey) under the "Safe Haven Laws", requiring law enforcement and first responders to care for children until they are released to a parent or guardian. He leaves a voicemail for the children's mother who texts back saying that they are on their way. Carson's attempts to complete his application for division commander are undermined by the children running haywire around the station, and the arrival of his ex, local environmentalist Dr. Amy Hicks who protests the smokejumpers taking water from endangered toad habitats to fight fires. She refuses Carson's attempt to offload the children onto her.

Despite the mayhem, the rest of the smokejumpers begin to bond with the children: toddler Zoey warms up to the brutish Axe and Torres teaches Will how to navigate dangerous situations. Brynn pays lip service to Rogers' admiration of Carson, then stages an escape on the station's ATV, spilling oil and slashing tires to prevent chase. Carson catches them by off-roading on a little girl's bike, cornering the children on a dirt road.

Will prompts Brynn to admit they are orphans on the run from foster care, avoiding their separation. The text messages were from Brynn herself. The group camp out overnight and Carson promises to hold off calling Child Services until after Zoey's 4th birthday in two days.

The group go all out preparing Zoey's birthday, and the four smokejumpers buy presents for Brynn and Will as well. Carson then tells Will a bedtime story about a yeti who was married to his job, had a son and then died on the job because he was distracted by having a family. Brynn and Hicks are both touched by the thinly veiled story of Carson's life. The overboard birthday party is interrupted by the unexpected arrival of both Richards and Child Services. The children flee in Richards' car, running it off the road right on a cliff. Brynn gets trapped in her seat belt. Carson parachutes down to rescue them and with Will's help, he frees Brynn before the car rolls off the cliff.

Back at the station, Hicks and the other smokejumpers bid an emotional farewell to the children. Richards tells Carson that family can be a source of support and that there is more to life than working. Inspired, Carson refuses to release the children to Child Services under the Safe Haven laws and proposes a plan to adopt all three of them.

Sometime later, Carson and Hicks get married with the smokejumpers and their adopted children in attendance.

== Cast ==
- John Cena as Superintendent Jake "Supe" Carson, a smokejumper who is the son of late Chief Dan Carson.
- Keegan-Michael Key as Captain Mark Rogers, a smokejumper who is loyal to Jake.
- John Leguizamo as Lieutenant Rodrigo Torres, a nervy and neurotic smokejumper.
- Brianna Hildebrand as Brynn, a 15-year-old girl who is rescued from a burning cabin by Jake alongside her siblings.
- Dennis Haysbert as Commander Bill Richards, a division Commander and the superior officer of Jake.
- Judy Greer as Dr. Amy Hicks, an environmentalist who is Jake's former date
- Tyler Mane as Axe, a huge and silent smokejumper who carries his fireman's pulaski everywhere.
  - Paul Potts as Axe's singing voice
- Christian Convery as Will, Brynn's younger 10-year-old brother
- Finley Rose Slater as Zoey, Brynn's younger 3-year-old (later 4-year-old) sister
- Daniel Cudmore as Burly Smoke Jumper #1
- Tom Europe as Burly Smoke Jumper #2
- Chris Webb as Burly Smoke Jumper #3
- Brad Kelly as Burly Smoke Jumper #4
- Lynda Boyd as Patty
- Jessica Garcie as Scared Mom
- Kurt Long as Scared Dad
- Shelby Wulfert as Shana Hiatt
- Nova and Kingsly as Masher, Jake's pet dog

== Production ==
The film was announced in October 2018 when John Cena was cast to star in the film. Andy Fickman was hired to direct the next month.

By January 2019, Brianna Hildebrand, Judy Greer, Keegan-Michael Key, Edoardo Carfora, Christian Convery, and John Leguizamo joined the cast. Rob Gronkowski was offered a role in the film but turned it down due to scheduling conflicts. Joe Manganiello was cast but was cut from the film.

Filming began on February 4, 2019, in Burnaby, British Columbia, and concluded on March 29. Visual effects and animation were done in post-production by Industrial Light & Magic.

== Release ==
The film was originally set to be released on March 20, 2020, but it was later moved up to November 8, 2019, taking over the original release date of Sonic the Hedgehog, which was later delayed to February 14, 2020.

== Reception ==
=== Box office ===
Playing with Fire grossed $44.5 million in the United States and Canada, and $24.2 million in other territories, for a worldwide total of $68.6 million.

In the United States and Canada, the film was released alongside Doctor Sleep, Midway and Last Christmas, and was projected to gross $7–10 million from 3,125 theaters in its opening weekend. It made $3.6 million on its first day, including $500,000 from Thursday night previews. It went on to debut to $12.8 million, beating projections, and also finishing third at the box office. In its second weekend the film made $8.6 million, finishing fourth behind Ford v Ferrari, Midway and Charlie's Angels.

=== Critical response ===
On review aggregator website Rotten Tomatoes, the film holds an approval rating of 24% based on 76 reviews, with an average rating of 4.1/10. Metacritic assigned the film a weighted average score of 24 out of 100, based on 14 critics, indicating "generally unfavorable reviews". Audiences polled by CinemaScore gave the film an average grade of "B+" on an A+ to F scale, while those surveyed at PostTrak gave it an average 2.5 out of 5 stars.

Wendy Ide for The Observer gave the film one star, describing the premise as "beyond inept" and calling it "(a) late contender for the worst movie of the year".
