= Zoe Levin =

American actress

- Born: November 24, 1993 (age 32); Chicago, Illinois, U.S.
- Occupation: Actress
- Years active: 2010–present

Zoe Levin is an American actress. She played Emily in the 2013 film Palo Alto and Tasha in Beneath the Harvest Sky. She portrayed Kara Souders in the Fox TV show Red Band Society. She played Tiffany "Tiff" Chester in the 2019 Netflix dark comedy Bonding. She is also part of the unreleased film The Long Home, directed by James Franco.

== Personal life ==
Levin was born in Chicago and moved to Glencoe when she was 11. She is from a Jewish family and attended the elementary and junior high school in Glencoe before graduating from New Trier High School.

She began acting at an early age and had tried out for her first professional play when she was 13. She then relocated to Los Angeles to study communication and fine arts at Loyola Marymount University. Her acting career kicked off in 2010 when she was selected to play a role in David Schwimmer's film Trust. This came after her performances at Chicago's Looking Glass Theatre.

Levin is currently living in Chicago.

== Filmography ==
Key
†	Denotes works that have not yet been released

Year	Film	Role	Notes
2010	Trust	Brittany	
2011	Hawaiian Vacation	Peas-in-a-Pod	Short film
2012	Advantage: Wienberg	Colleen O'Shaughnessy	Short film
2013	The Way Way Back	Steph	
2013	Arrested Development	High School Girl #1	Episode: "Senoritis"
2013	Palo Alto	Emily	
2013	Beneath the Harvest Sky	Tasha	
2014–2015	Red Band Society	Kara Souders	Main cast; 13 episodes
2016	Relationship Status	Libby	3 episodes
2018	Summer Days, Summer Nights	Lydia	
2019–2021	Bonding	Tiff	Lead role; 15 episodes
2021	The Long Home	Amber Rose	
2023	White House Plumbers	Lisa Hunt	
