= Vacation Friends =

- Promotional release poster
- Directed by: Clay Tarver
- Written by: Tom Mullen; Tim Mullen; Clay Tarver; Jonathan Goldstein; John Francis Daley
- Produced by: Todd Garner; Timothy M. Bourne
- Starring: John Cena; Lil Rel Howery; Yvonne Orji; Meredith Hagner; Robert Wisdom; Lynn Whitfield; Andrew Bachelor
- Cinematography: Tim Suhrstedt
- Edited by: Evan Henke
- Music by: Rolfe Kent
- Production companies: 20th Century Studios; Broken Road Productions
- Distributed by: Hulu (United States); Disney+ (International)
- Release date: August 27, 2021
- Running time: 103 minutes
- Country: United States
- Language: English

Vacation Friends is a 2021 American buddy comedy film directed by Clay Tarver, and co-written by Tom Mullen, Tim Mullen, Jonathan Goldstein and John Francis Daley. The film stars John Cena, Lil Rel Howery, Yvonne Orji, Meredith Hagner, Robert Wisdom, Lynn Whitfield, and Andrew Bachelor.

Distributed by 20th Century Studios, Vacation Friends was released on Hulu on August 27, 2021. The film received mixed reviews from critics. A sequel titled Vacation Friends 2 was released on August 25, 2023.

== Plot ==
Marcus and Emily are on vacation in Mexico, where he intends to propose. His plan is ruined when first their room is flooded, and then a hotel employee ruins the surprise. With no other choice, Marcus proposes to her on the spot in the lobby, and she accepts. Wild and carefree Ron and Kyla watch their special moment, inviting them to stay with them in their luxury suite.

The four spend their vacation together, which includes Marcus and Emily eloping. Both black out due to excessive drinking but Marcus briefly regains consciousness during what appears to be Kyla having sex with him. The next day, Emily remembers nothing from the night before and Marcus decides to keep what he recalls a secret. At the end of their vacation, Marcus and Emily decide to cut ties with Ron and Kyla.

Months later, Marcus and Emily have their official wedding, hosted by Emily's parents, Harold and Suzanne. They, especially Harold, don't approve of Marcus, partly because of an incident where Marcus punched Emily's brother Gabe. Harold entrusts Marcus with the rings for the wedding, which belonged to Emily's great-grandparents.

Before the ceremony, Ron and Kyla crash the reception after discovering the wedding location online. Harold is initially furious at the intrusion, but instantly welcomes the couple after learning that Ron was a fellow Green Beret. Kyla reveals she is pregnant and Marcus is 'directly involved' in the pregnancy, making him believe that he is the baby's father. The next day, Ron speaks to Harold, convincing him to give Marcus a second chance. A grateful Marcus selects Ron to be best man, and Ron convinces Marcus to entrust him with the rings.

The next day, the men go golfing, with Gabe and his friend. To Marcus's chagrin, Ron suggests they bet on the game. Halfway through the round, Ron reveals that he bankrolled the wagers by pawning the wedding rings. On the final hole, Ron makes a massive bet that he can hit the 18th green in a single stroke. Despite Ron initially looking at the wrong green, forcing him to make a 375-yard shot to win the bet, he miraculously sinks a hole in one to win the bet.

After returning to the pawnshop to retrieve the rings, Ron accidentally causes Marcus to drop the rings in a sewer grate. Marcus chokes Ron in anger, who reveals that he was told by a doctor that he was sterile and that Kyla got pregnant 'because of Marcus'.

At the rehearsal dinner, Kyla prepares to make a speech, where it seems like she is going to announce that Marcus is the father of her child. He interrupts, sharing the full story of what he believes happened in Mexico, only for Kyla to reveal they only intend to name the baby after Marcus, and he is not the father. Emily reveals she was the one having sex with Kyla on top of Marcus. Marcus tells an angry Harold the rings were lost and a fight ensues. Outside the wedding hall, Marcus and Emily angrily demand that Ron and Kyla leave.

Emily's grandma, Phyllis delivers a wedding gift from Kyla. The letter inside reveals that Ron had lost his previous best friend Charlie (on military duty) and that his relationship with her and Marcus has helped him to recover. The gift is the wedding rings, which Ron retrieved from the sewer. Emily and Marcus realize they made a mistake by sending Kyla and Ron away, so they eventually find them. The four reunite, while Ron and Kyla reveal they are finally planning to marry, holding the same ceremony in Mexico where Marcus and Emily tied the knot, along with their family and friends joining.

== Cast ==
- Lil Rel Howery as Marcus
- Yvonne Orji as Emily
- John Cena as Ron
- Meredith Hagner as Kyla
- Robert Wisdom as Harold
- Lynn Whitfield as Suzanne
- Andrew Bachelor as Gabe
- Tawny Newsome as Brooke
- Barry Rothbart as Darren
- Kamal Bolden as Bennet
- Anna Maria Horsford as Nancy
- Carlos Santos as Maurillio

== Production ==
In March 2014, it was announced Chris Pratt and Anna Faris were set to star in the film, with Steve Pink set to direct from a screenplay by Tom and Tim Mullen, and 20th Century Fox distributing. In November 2015, it was reported Ice Cube had signed on to replace Pratt, with Faris no longer attached. In December 2019, it was announced John Cena, Lil Rel Howery, and Meredith Hagner would star in the film instead, with Clay Tarver replacing Pink, 20th Century Studios attached to produce, and Hulu set to distribute. In January 2020, Yvonne Orji joined the cast of the film. In March 2020, Tawny Newsome and Barry Rothbart were added as well, and in September 2020, Lynn Whitfield, Robert Wisdom and Kamal Bolden also signed on to co-star.

Principal photography began in Georgia in March 2020. However, production was halted due to the COVID-19 pandemic. Production resumed in September 2020, and concluded in October 2020.

== Release ==
The film was released on Hulu on August 27, 2021, in the United States, Disney+ in international markets such as Canada and the United Kingdom. It was released as a launch title on Star+ on August 31 in Latin America. Disney+ Hotstar released the film in India on August 27, and in select territories on September 3, 2021.

== Reception ==
=== Viewership ===
Hulu reported that Vacation Friends became the most-watched original film in its opening weekend of all time on the streaming service. Whip Media, which tracks viewership data for the more than 25 million worldwide users of its TV Time app, calculated that it was the ninth most-streamed film in the U.S. for the week ended August 27, 2023. Nielsen Media Research, which records streaming viewership on U.S. television screens, reported that Vacation Friends was watched for 275 million minutes and ranked as the fifth most-streamed film during the week of August 23–29, 2021. It later garnered 243 million minutes of watch time and became the sixth most-streamed movie from August 30 to September 5, 2021.

=== Critical response ===
On the review aggregator website Rotten Tomatoes the film holds an approval rating of 58% based on 74 reviews, with an average rating of 5.60/10. The critics consensus reads, "The laughs aren't always in steady supply, but the terrific cast makes Vacation Friends a comedy you can stream without serious reservations." According to Metacritic, which sampled 16 critics and calculated a weighted average score of 49 out of 100, the film received "mixed or average reviews".

Glenn Kenny of The New York Times stated that the movie's strength resides in its cast that successfully manages to provide entertainment, while finding Clay Tarver's direction skillful compared to what other buddy comedy movie directors provide. Matthew Aguilar of ComicBook.com rated the movie four out of five stars, found that the chemistry between the cast members delivers delight, praised the performances of the actors, while finding that Tarver's direction skillfully captures the attention of the audience with his own perspective on the buddy comedy genre.

Matt Fowler of IGN rated the movie seven out of ten and praised the chemistry between the characters, complimented the performances of the cast, stating that both Cena and Meredith Hagner have a natural aptitude to provide a sharp humor, despite finding the movie unsurprising with its plot. Brandon Katz of Observer rated the film two and a half out of four stars, claimed that the movie proves Cena is successfully able to portray characters in the comedy genre, found the soundtrack and classic humor of the movie enjoyable, despite finding it a bit generic compared to other buddy comedy movies.

Melanie McFarland of Salon.com faults the film for not dealing with the racial issues it raises, saying the film "promote[s] the fantasy that the racial strife between white people and Black people is a matter of perception, not reality."

== Sequel ==
In September 2021, it was reported that a sequel titled Honeymoon Friends was in development, with the cast and Clay Tarver set to return. In April 2023, the film was retitled Vacation Friends 2 and given a release date of August 25, 2023.
