= Otherwise Engaged =

Comic play by Simon Gray

- Flyer for original production
- Original language: English
- Written by: Simon Gray
- Genre: Drama
- Setting: A house in London, UK

Premiere
- Date: 10 July 1975
- Place: Queen's Theatre, London
- Official website

Otherwise Engaged is a bleakly comic play by English playwright Simon Gray. The play previewed at the Oxford Playhouse and the Richmond Theatre, and then opened at the Queen's Theatre in London on 10 July 1975, with Alan Bates as the star and Harold Pinter as director, produced by Michael Codron. Ian Charleson co-starred as Dave, a Glasgow lout. Michael Gambon took over from Bates in 1976, "playing it for a year, eight times a week." The play also had a successful run on Broadway, opening in February 1977 with Tom Courtenay as Simon and Carolyn Lagerfelt as Beth. It won the New York Drama Critics' Circle Award for Best Play.

== Plot ==
The play revolves around a British publisher named Simon Hench. When we first see Hench, he has settled down in his lavish living room, and plans to spend a pleasant afternoon listening to Parsifal. However, Hench is repeatedly interrupted by his tenant, his friends, family and aspiring writers, all of whom want something from him.

First, he is visited by his tenant Dave, a penniless student. Later, Hench must deal with his brother, a money-strapped public school teacher with a large family to support. Later, Hench meets with a drunken journalist mate, and with that mate's girlfriend (an aspiring writer who is more than willing to flaunt her body to get a publishing contract from Hench). Later, Hench receives a call from a meek gentleman that Hench used to torment when they were schoolboys, and whose young girl friend Hench has been sleeping with.

Finally, Hench's tranquil afternoon is interrupted by his wife, who announces that she is leaving him.

Initially, Hench seems witty, warm and charming. For much of the play, he appears to be the one and only sane, grounded character. Gradually, this façade is stripped away, and Hench is revealed as a cold, selfish, cruel, lonely bully, unable to connect emotionally with others, and unable to care deeply about anyone but himself.

== Original cast ==
- Beth – Mary Miller
- Dave – Ian Charleson
- Davina – Jacqueline Pearce
- Jeff – Julian Glover
- Simon – Alan Bates
- Stephen – Nigel Hawthorne
- Wood – Benjamin Whitrow

=== Critical reception ===
Of the London production, Clive Barnes wrote in The New York Times, "The play brings together once more the three people who had earlier given us "Butley," the playwright Simon Gray, Harold Pinter as director and its star, Alan Bates. They have proved that lightning can strike twice in the same place, and indeed this is probably a more substantial play than "Butley," and Mr. Bates, at his most magisterially comic, is even better, deeper and funnier than in his Tony Award winning performance in the earlier play. In fact, not to waste words, Mr. Bates is terrific."

== Other productions ==
The play was revived at the Criterion Theatre in 2005 in a production starring Richard E. Grant and Anthony Head, directed by Simon Curtis, produced by Mark Rubinstein, Sonia Friedman, Jeremy Meadow and Lee Menzies.

== Sequel ==
Gray wrote a sequel, titled Simply Disconnected. The play once again featured Gray's muse, Bates, reprising his role as Simon Hench. This premiered on May 10, 1996, as part of the Chichester Theatre Festival.

== Awards and nominations ==
=== Original Broadway production ===
Year	Award	Category	Nominee	Result
1977	Drama Desk Award	Outstanding Play		Nominated
1977	Drama Desk Award	Outstanding Actor in a Play	Tom Courtenay	Nominated
1977	Drama Desk Award	Outstanding Featured Actor in a Play	Michael Lombard	Nominated
1977	Tony Award	Best Play		Nominated
1977	Tony Award	Best Actor in a Play	Tom Courtenay	Nominated

== Bibliography ==
- Who's Who in the Theatre, 16th/17th editions, Pitman/Gale (1977/1982)
- Gambon: A Life in Acting, Mel Gussow, Nick Hern Books/Applause (2004)
