= Herbert Ward (sculptor) =

English artist and writer (1863–1919)

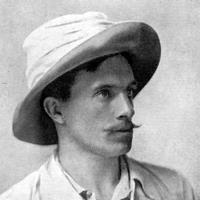
Herbert Ward, c. 1889

Herbert Ward (11 January 1863, London – 5 August 1919, Neuilly-sur-Seine) was a British sculptor, illustrator, writer, and explorer in Africa. He was a member of Henry Morton Stanley's Emin Pasha Relief Expedition and became a close friend of Roger Casement while they were working in the Congo Free State. Ward later became a sculptor and lived in France. He was awarded the Croix de Guerre, was twice mentioned in dispatches in World War I, was an officer of the Légion d'Honneur and a member of the Royal Society of British Sculptors.

== Early life ==
Ward left Mill Hill School at the age of 15 and travelled to New Zealand, spending the next three years in New Zealand and Australia. He was "in turn kauri-gum digger, coal and gold miner, stock-rider, circus performer and sail-maker". He spent a year as a cadet with the British North Borneo Company, but a bout of malaria forced him to return to England.

== In the Congo ==
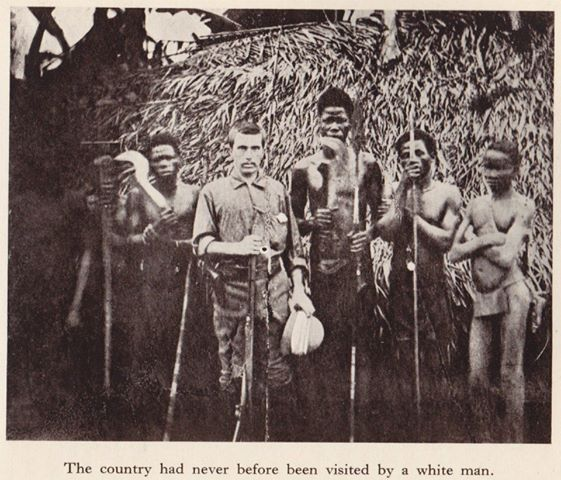
Ward in the Congo, c. 1886

In 1884, Ward met Henry Morton Stanley in London, when he was interviewed for a post as an officer in the new Congo Free State, effectively a private colony of King Leopold of Belgium. Stanley recommended Ward for a position, and he worked for the next two years along the upper and lower Congo River, where he first met Roger Casement. The latter was working on construction of a railroad to bypass the cataracts of the lower river. After being replaced by a Belgian officer, Ward joined the Sanford Exploring Company.

In March 1887, having left the Sanford Company, Ward was returning to England when he again encountered Stanley, who was assembling the Emin Pasha Relief Expedition. Stanley appointed Ward as a lieutenant and placed him under the command of Major Edmund Barttelot in the expedition's rear column. Stanley left the rear column, consisting of 250 porters and five officers, in June 1887, saying "I shall find you here in October when I return." Because of Stanley's delays, the rear column remained at Yambuya by the Aruwimi River for the next fourteen months, rather than four. By that time, more than 100 of its porters had died, and two of its officers died soon after.

When Ward was in the Congo, cannibalism was still widespread in some regions, and it is frequently mentioned in his works, including in the title of his first book, Five Years with the Congo Cannibals. He reported that once, while he was camping, human flesh was being cooked all around his tent, and that he had seen it being roasted also on other occasions. Like other observers, he states that both killed or captured enemies as well as purchased slaves were consumed. More than once, Ward saw how slaves intended for consumption were being transported along or exposed on markets where they were slaughtered, in some cases, right after sale. He also saw captives being prepared for consumption and, another time, how the flesh of a freshly butchered victim was distributed.

Ward found that the eating of human flesh was considered a self-evident and natural custom. Slaves were often cheap – "two ordinary women may be purchased for the price of one pig" – and people did not find their consumption more troubling than that of animals, arguing that both were "property". Repeatedly he was invited to meals of human flesh by well-intended hosts who were surprised when they learned that he did not eat it. Once he talked with a young Bangala man who enthused how "very good eating" a recently slaughtered slave boy had made ("he was nice and fat"), and he also heard from other cannibals how "good" it was to eat human flesh. Indeed he stated that around Bangala Station, "the pot" was the usual destination of any slave who annoyed or disappointed their owner, and "light repast[s] off the limbs of some unfortunate slave, slain for refractory behavior", were served in the area on a fairly regular basis.

He noticed that cannibalism was also a matter of prestige, since "a chief's position is esteemed according to the number of slaves he is able to kill" for regaling his followers. Despite these customs, Ward liked the character of the people he met, noting that they were very cordial in their family relationships and towards friends and "possess[ed] so much taste for form and decoration". Though killing slaves and enemies without hesitation, they were "not mean". He found them to be "sympathetic" as well as "enlightened and enterprising" and concluded that "in direct opposition to all natural conjectures, they are among the best types of men".

An accomplished big game hunter, Ward was known in Bangala as Nkumbe, "the black hawk". He was also referred to as Mayala Mbemba, "the wings of an eagle", a tribute to a 40-mile trek he had accomplished in a single day on atrocious roads from Kimpete to Lukungu, Congo. Ward left the Congo in early 1889. He never returned, but "the enchantment of Africa held him nevertheless, dominating his future, shaping and colouring his life's work – the imprint of those five years was indelible".

== Roger Casement ==
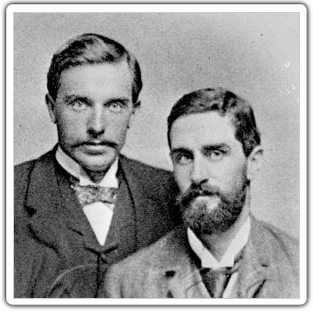
Herbert Ward (left) and Roger Casement, c. 1886

Ward first met Roger Casement in the Congo in 1884. They became close friends, a friendship which lasted 30 years, and he asked Casement to be the godfather of his youngest son. Writing in 1910, Ward says:

Imagine a tall, handsome man, of fine bearing; thin, mere muscle and bone, a sun-tanned face, blue eyes and black curly hair. A pure Irishman he is, with a captivating voice and singular charm of manner. A man of distinction and great refinement, high-minded and courteous, impulsive and poetical. Quixotic perhaps some would say, and with a certain truth, for few men have shown themselves so regardless of personal advancement.

Ward helped finance Edmund Morel's pamphlet The Congo Slave State (1903) and introduced him to Casement. Describing Casement to Morel, Ward wrote: "No man walks this earth at the moment who is more absolutely good and honest and noble-minded". Ward subscribed as a supporter of the Congo Reform Association, which was founded by Casement and Morel.

Ward fell out with Casement because of his activities at the start of World War I. Casement travelled to Berlin to solicit German help for an armed Irish uprising for independence, at a time when the British government would be immersed in war. Ward wrote "the enormity of his action is beyond exaggeration. He is a traitor pure and simple ... I have made up my mind to turn him down forever". He fulfilled his threat, refusing to sign the petition for clemency that was organised in 1916 by writer Arthur Conan Doyle after Casement was condemned to death for treason. Joseph Conrad, a fellow officer with Ward of the Sanford Exploring Company and then a friend of Casement, also refused to sign. Ward arranged for the name of his youngest son (Casement's godson) to be changed by deed poll from Roger Casement Ward to Rodney Sanford Ward.

== The artist ==
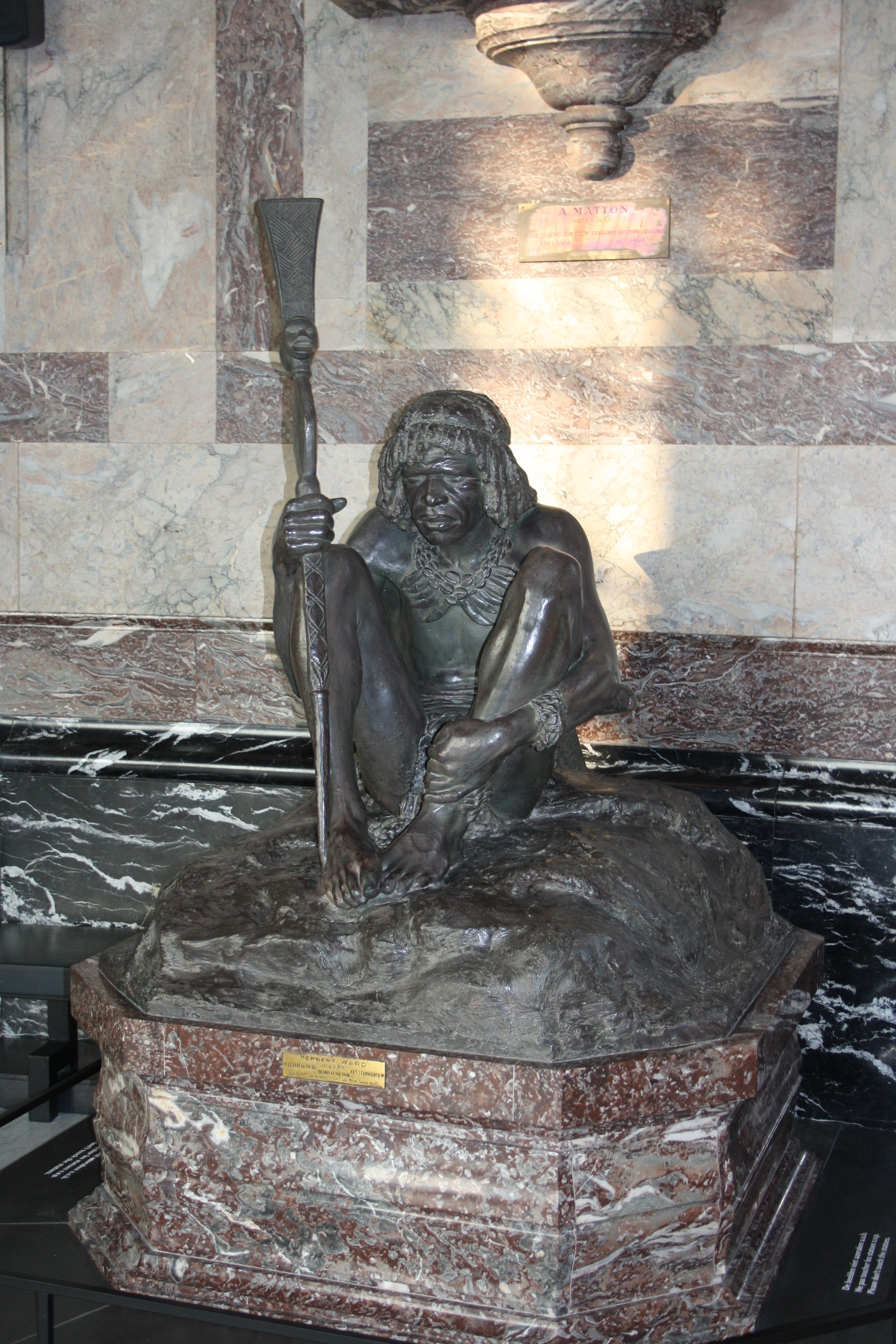
Le Chef de Tribu, Ward's Salon gold medal-winning sculpture of 1908, in the Royal Museum for Central Africa, Tervuren

On his return to England in 1889, Ward at first made a living on the lecture circuit. As a result of his childhood friendship with Alfred Harmsworth, he also worked as a journalist. He travelled with and reported on Fridtjoft Nansen's Fram expedition and the Jackson–Harmsworth expedition.

His main ambition was to become an artist: he had already published many of the drawings and water-colours he made in Africa in Five Years with the Congo Cannibals. He became a pupil successively of Jules Lefebvre and of Seymour Lucas RA. In the 1890s he exhibited six times at the Royal Academy summer exhibition.

In 1899, deciding that sculpture was where his real talents lay, he apprenticed to Goscombe John RA before moving permanently to work in France. He received a mention honourable in 1901 at the Salon des Artistes Français for his first sculpture, An Aruwimi Type; in 1908 he won the salon's gold medal for Le Chef de Tribu. He won another gold medal in 1910.

Theodore Roosevelt wrote of him: "There is in Paris no more interesting character than Herbert Ward ... All the mystery and the savagery and the suffering and the ugliness and the harsh beauty of the African forest come out in Mr Ward's works. Only an artist could have done what he has done, and no artist could have done it had there not lain within him the soul of a great man, a man both strong and pitiful."

Ward's auction record is £50,000, set at Bonham's auction house, London, on 30 January 2019, for An Aruwimi Type, of c1901.

== War service ==
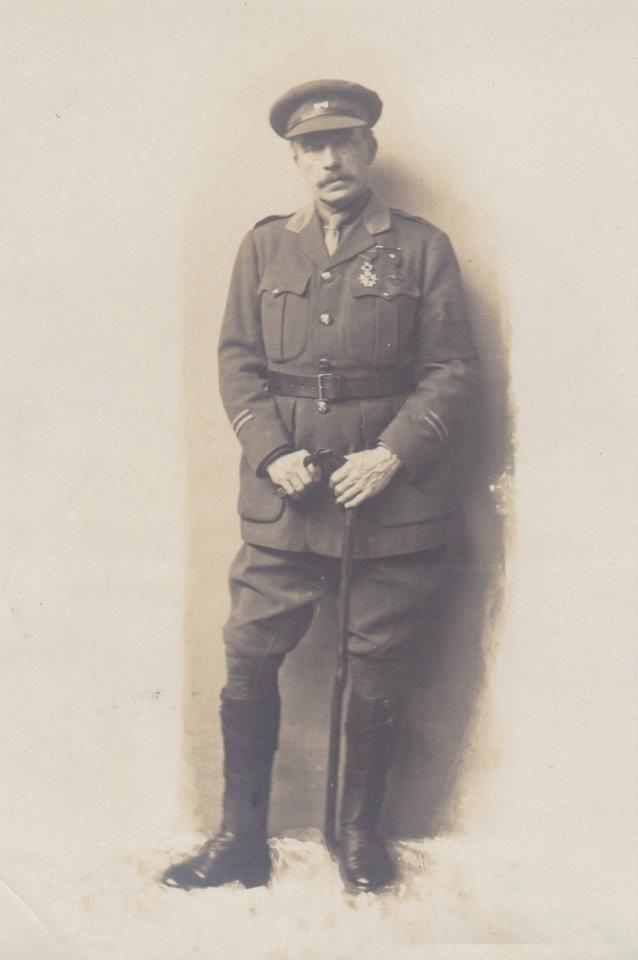
Herbert Ward in uniform wearing the Croix de Guerre, c. 1916

By the time World War I broke out, Ward was too old to enlist in the army. He converted his family home at Rolleboise, Seine-et-Oise, into a field hospital, with 20 beds. He served as a lieutenant with the No 3 convoy of the British Ambulance Committee, which operated under the French army at Gérardmer in the Vosges. He was wounded at the front and mentioned in dispatches in 1915; he was awarded the Croix de Guerre by France for his work removing wounded soldiers whilst under bombardment. He died, partly as a result of his injuries, in August 1919.

== Family ==
Ward's father was Edwin Ward, a taxidermist. Edwin's brother was noted taxidermist Rowland Ward. Herbert's grandfather, Henry Ward, travelled with John James Audubon on his 1831–32 collecting visit to South Carolina and Florida in the southern United States.

After returning to England from the Congo, in 1890 Ward married an American, Sarita Sanford (1860–1944). She was the daughter of Charles Henry Sanford (1840–1928), a wealthy financier and his wife.

The Wards had five children:

- Sarita Enriqueta (1891–1985), who married 1) Sir Colville Barclay and 2) Robert Vansittart, 1st Baron Vansittart.
- Frances (1893–1988), wife of Sir Eric Phipps.
- Charles Sanford (1896–1916), killed on the Western Front at Neuve Chapelle while serving as a lieutenant with the Royal Warwickshire Regiment.
- Herbert Sanford (1898–1987), he had joined the Royal Flying Corps aged 17 and was shot down over the western front, later escaping to Switzerland. He later became a clergyman and minister,
- Rodney Sanford (né Roger Casement) (1901–1922). Ward had named this son after his friend Roger Casement but had his name officially changed after Casement's conviction and execution as a traitor because of activities with Irish Republicans against the UK.

Ward is buried in the Père-Lachaise cemetery in Paris.

== Representation in other media ==
Ward also features as a character in Simon Gray's play The Rear Column (1978), and in a film version of the play directed by Harold Pinter in 1980. Ward's character was played by Simon Ward in the stage and film versions.

== Collections ==
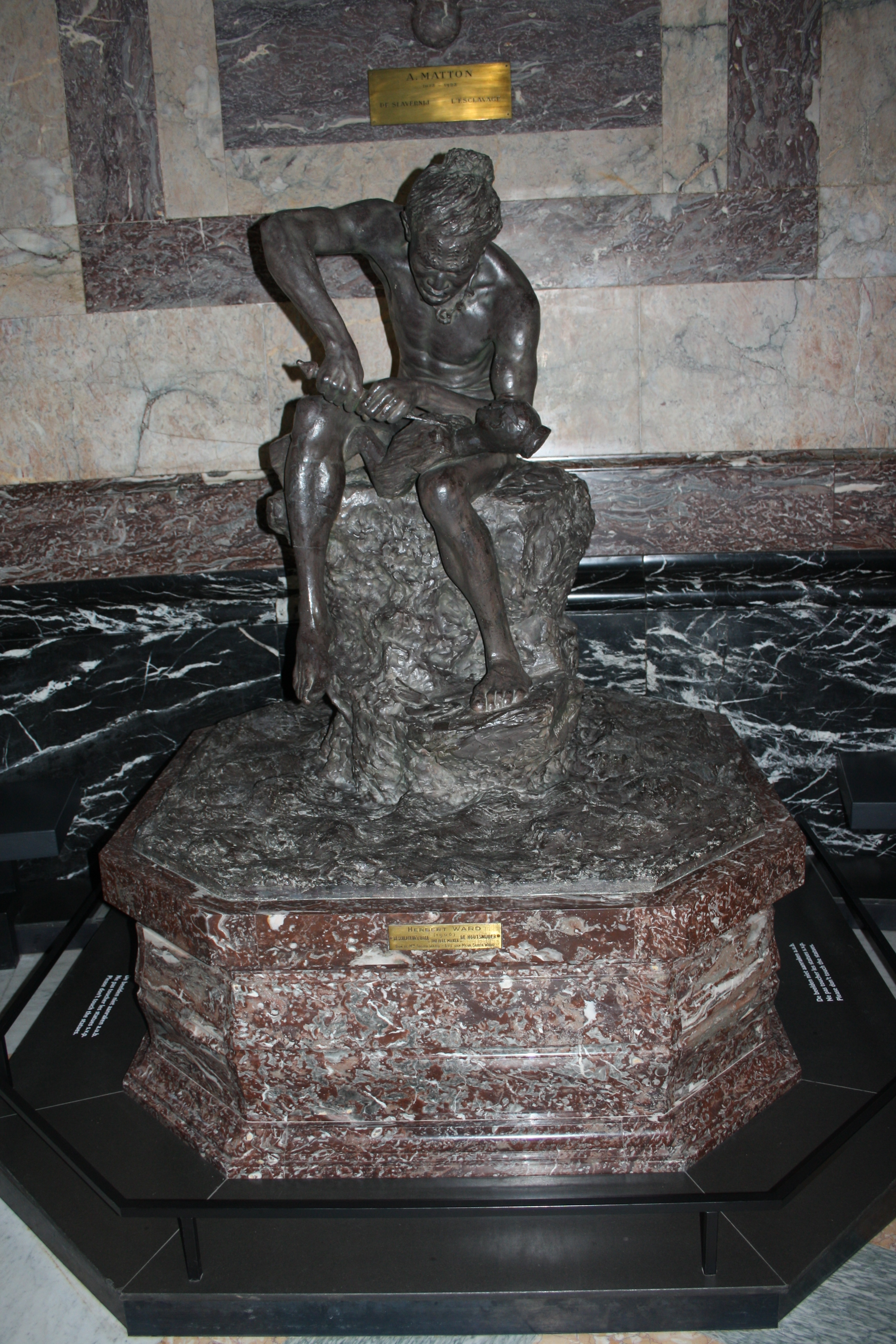
The Idol Maker in the Royal Museum for Central Africa

Ward's works can be found in public collections including the following:

- The Smithsonian Institution
- The National Museum of Wales
- The Royal Museum for Central Africa, Tervuren, Belgium
- Mill Hill School, London – Grief, given by the artist
- The Library of Congress
- Le Musée des Beaux-Arts de Nantes
- The Johannesburg Art Gallery
- Le Musée du Luxembourg, Paris
- Le Musée d'Orsay, Paris

== Bibliography ==
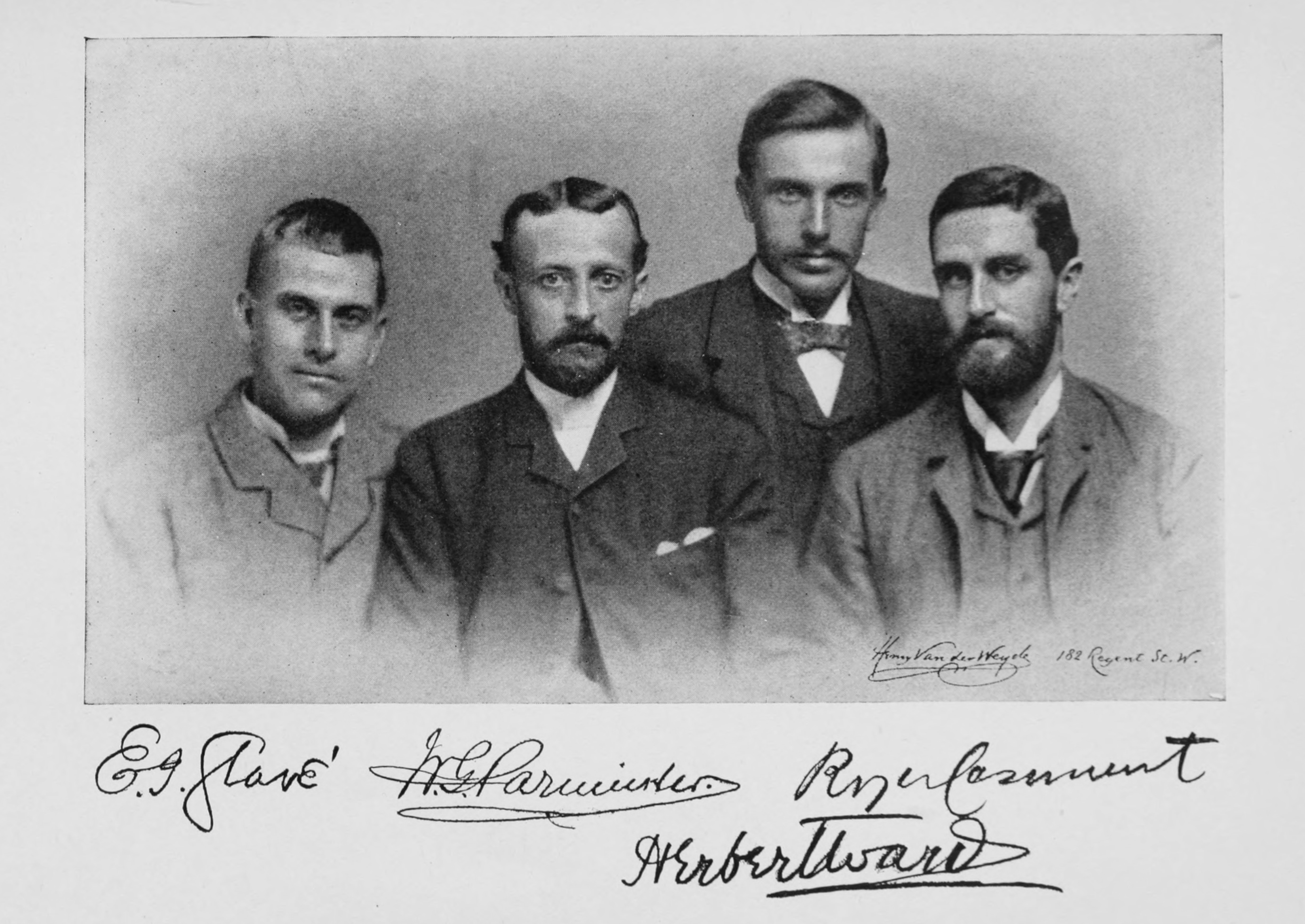
Edward J. Glave, W. G. Parminter, Herbert Ward and Roger Casement (from left to right) – photograph by Henry Van der Weyde from A Voice from the Congo (1910)

=== Published works by Herbert Ward ===
- Ward, Herbert (1891a). Five Years with the Congo Cannibals. London: Chatto & Windus.
- Ward, Herbert (1891b). My Life with Stanley's Rear Guard. New York: Charles L. Webster.
- Ward, Herbert (1910). A Voice from the Congo. New York: Charles Scribner's Sons.
- Ward, Herbert (1916). Mr Poilu: Notes and Sketches with the Fighting French. London: Hodder & Stoughton.

=== Publications about or featuring Herbert Ward ===
- North Borneo: Explorations and Adventures on the Equator, Frank & Joseph Hatton, 1886.
- "Herbert Ward et l'âme de la race noire", Francis de Miomandre, in L'Art et les artistes, Paris, 1912.
- The Arm-chair at the Inn, Francis Hopkinson Smith, Scribner & Sons, 1912.
- A Valiant Gentleman; Being the Biography of Herbert Ward, Artist and Man of Action, Sarita Ward, Chapman & Hall, 1927. (French translation: Herbert Ward: artiste et homme d'action, Sarita Ward, La Revue Mondiale, Paris, 1931.)
- Herbert Ward, Armand Dayot, in the Dictionnaire biographique des artistes contemporains, Vol. 3, Paris, 1934.
- In Limbo: The Story of Stanley's Rear Column, Tony Gould, Hamish Hamilton, 1979.
- Breedon, Kirsty (2 July 2010). "Herbert Ward: Sculpture in the Circum-Atlantic World". Visual Culture in Britain. 11 (2): 265–283. doi:10.1080/14714781003785196. ISSN 1471-4787.
- Valiant Gentlemen, historical novel by Sabina Murray, Grove/Atlantic, 2016.

== See also ==
- James Sligo Jameson, another European member of the rear column
