= Wise Child =

Play by Simon Gray

- Playbill cover for Broadway production
- Original language: English
- Written by: Simon Gray
- Genre: Drama
- Setting: The present. The Southern Hotel, Reading, England

Premiere
- Date: 10 October 1967
- Place: Wyndham's Theatre, London
- Official website

Wise Child is a 1967 play by English playwright Simon Gray.

== Plot ==
The play concerns orphaned Jerry Artminster, who blackmails a criminal named Jock Masters by promising he will not reveal his identity if Jock agrees to impersonate the boy's mother in the Reading, Berkshire, (England) hotel where the boy lives. Others involved are Mr. Booker, the gay hotel manager who fancies the boy, and Janice, a black woman who works in the hotel.

== Original production ==
The play was first staged on 10 October 1967 at Wyndham's Theatre in London, directed by John Dexter, with Alec Guinness as Jock.

Original cast

- Jock Masters/Mrs. Artminster – Alec Guinness
- Mr. Booker – Gordon Jackson
- Jerry – Simon Ward
- Janice – Cleo Sylvestre

Critical reception

Harold Hobson wrote in The Sunday Times, "in Mr Gray..the theatre has discovered a writer of quality and consequence."

== Broadway ==
After 12 previews, the Broadway production at the Helen Hayes Theatre opened on 27 January 1972. It closed after four performances following critical thrashings by Clive Barnes and Walter Kerr in The New York Times and Richard Watts Jr. in the New York Post.

The New York City production was directed by James Hammerstein and starred Donald Pleasence as Jock.

Broadway cast

- Jock – Donald Pleasence
- Jerry – Bud Cort
- Mr. Booker – George Rose
- Janice – Lauren Jones

Critical reception

Clive Barnes wrote in The New York Times, "The play means to shock. It ends up by boring...and this despite a virtuoso performance by Donald Pleasence...Bud Cort, as a fey boy in search of a relationship, is also excellent. His washed-out youth and inarticulate passions were brilliantly expressed in a performance of almost flamboyant spontaneity."

Donald Pleasence was nominated for the Tony Award for Best Actor in Play.
