= Sean Bourke =

Irish criminal (1934–1982)

Sean Aloysius Bourke (1934–1982) was an Irish criminal from Limerick who aided in the prison escape of the British spy George Blake in October 1966. Blake had been convicted in 1961 of spying for the Soviet Union. After the escape, Blake eventually made his way to Moscow; Bourke did too, but eventually returned to Ireland. Bourke's co-conspirators were Michael Randle and Pat Pottle.

Only Pottle and Randle were criminally charged for abetting the escape, and they were eventually found not guilty by a jury, based on their claims that they helped Blake escape because his 42-year sentence was "inhuman". Bourke was never charged over the matter, for Ireland refused to extradite him to the United Kingdom.

== Life ==
Bourke was born in Limerick into a large family. Poet Desmond O'Grady was his first cousin. As a boy of 12, Bourke was sentenced to three years in Daingean reformatory in October 1947 for stealing bananas from a lorry. Subsequently, he trained as a bricklayer but was frequently in trouble with the law, owing in part to his alcoholism.

Having moved to Britain, in 1961 he was convicted of sending an explosive device through the post to a Detective Constable Michael Sheldon, against whom he bore a grudge. The bomb exploded, but caused no injury. He was sentenced to seven years in prison. While in Wormwood Scrubs prison in London, he founded and edited the prison magazine, New Horizon.

In this role he met George Blake, who wrote contributions for the magazine. Bourke also met anti-nuclear campaigners Randle and Pottle in the prison.

=== George Blake escape ===
After his release, Bourke set about organising Blake's escape from Wormwood Scrubs. The escape was masterminded by Bourke, who originally approached Michael Randle only for financial help. Randle, however, became more involved and suggested they bring Pat Pottle in on the plan as well, for Pottle had originally suggested to Randle, in 1962 when they were both still in prison, the idea of springing Blake.

Bourke had smuggled a walkie-talkie to Blake to communicate with him whilst in jail. It was decided that Blake would break a window at the end of the corridor where his cell was located. Then between 6 and 7 pm, whilst most of the other inmates and guards were at the weekly film showing, Blake could climb through the window, slide down a porch and get to the perimeter wall; at that point, Bourke would throw a rope ladder made of knitting needles over the wall so that Blake could climb over and they would then drive off to the safe house. The escape was successful, although Blake fell from the wall and broke his wrist.

Randle and Pottle later wrote that they got Blake out of the area, first to Dover, hidden in a van, and then to a checkpoint in East Germany. From there, Blake was able to get to the Soviet Union.

Shortly afterwards, Bourke joined Blake in Moscow, where he lived for a year and a half on an allowance provided by the Soviets. However, he disliked Russia and so he was allowed to return to Ireland. The Soviets refused to allow Bourke to take the manuscript of his book, The Springing of George Blake, out of the country; he later re-wrote the text.

Two interviews of Bourke were made, and appear in a video clip: one a 1968 interview from a British documentary, and the other a later RTÉ interview by Mike Murphy. The British documentary includes a recording which Bourke made of a two-way radio conversation he had with Blake inside the prison, on 18 October 1966, four days before the escape.

The UK tried to have Bourke extradited to face criminal charges, but the Irish Supreme Court rejected this request in 1973, ruling that Bourke's aid of Blake's escape fell within the political offence exception to Ireland's extradition laws. An attempt to get him extradited on the separate charge of threatening the life of Detective Sheldon (in an abusive letter he had sent to the policeman) also failed. Hence, no charges were laid against Bourke for his role in the escape of George Blake. Randle and Pottle were prosecuted in 1991, but the jury found them not guilty, accepting their claim that their acts had been a moral response to the excessively long ("inhuman") sentence that Blake had received.

=== Later life ===
After returning to Ireland, Bourke published his book The Springing of George Blake, an account of the escape. He also wrote a number of articles, including a harrowing account of his time in Daingean reformatory, published in Old Limerick Journal in 1982.

He spent the royalties from his book, helping the poor and disadvantaged of Limerick, as well as money he had been given by the Soviet Union and by his supporters. He gave financial support to local politician Jim Kemmy of the Democratic Socialist Party.

By 1981, Bourke had left Limerick and was living in a caravan in the Percy French Estate in Kilkee, County Clare, and claimed to be writing a book on his life in Moscow and his conversations with George Blake, with the working title The Scrubbers. He eventually obtained some funds from the estate of his uncle "Feathery" Bourke, but claimed that the lawyers received more than he did.

=== Death ===
Bourke was almost penniless during his last years of living in the caravan, suffering increasingly from alcohol-related health problems. He collapsed and died while walking down the road. The coroner gave his cause of death as "a heart attack, coronary thrombosis." Two local doctors disagreed with this assessment. A local newspaper report added the following specifics to the circumstances of Bourke's death:

"Only a few hundred yards from Kilkee, he was seen to stagger, clutch his chest and fall dying onto the grass margin. In the vital hours between word of his death reaching Limerick and relatives, the manuscript that Sean Bourke had been working on somehow disappeared. ... [in] the caravan, there was no sign of any papers".

Years later, after defecting to the West, former KGB officer Oleg Kalugin claimed in his book, The First Directorate: My 32 Years in Intelligence and Espionage Against the West, that Bourke's death was the eventual result of a poisoning ordered by Aleksandr Sakharovsky.

== In culture ==
Sean Bourke appears as a character in Simon Gray's play Cell Mates, which tells the story of Blake's escape from Wormwood Scrubs and of Bourke's subsequent visit to Moscow. In the original production, Bourke was played by Rik Mayall. The BBC Radio play After the Break by Ian Curteis examines his relationship with George Blake after the escape from Wormwood Scrubs. In it, the epilogue says that he was found dead under a cherry tree beside the River Liffey in Dublin.

In 1974, Bourke appeared on the RTÉ current affairs programme 7 Days, where he was interviewed regarding the changes he encountered in Limerick after returning to the city.

Shortly after Bourke's death in 1983, RTÉ broadcast a radio documentary on his life titled A Death in January.
