= The Rear Column =

Play written by Simon Gray

- Original West End programme
- Original language: English
- Written by: Simon Gray
- Genre: Drama
- Setting: The jungle of the Congo Free State, 1887

Premiere
- Date: 22 February 1978
- Place: The Globe Theatre, London
- Official website

The Rear Column is a play by Simon Gray set in the jungle of the Congo Free State in 1887–88. The story begins after explorer Henry Morton Stanley, has gone to relieve Emin Pasha, governor of Equatoria, from a siege by Mahdist forces. He leaves behind him a 'rear column' with supplies at the Yambuya camp on the Aruwimi River and instructs them to wait until the Arab slave trader, Tippu Tib, has brought 600 more porters before following on to Equatoria. The play follows the story of the men left waiting in the camp. The officers depicted in the play are based on historical figures.

The play was first produced in London's West End in 1978 at the Globe Theatre in London, now known as the Gielgud Theatre.

== Characters ==
- James S. Jameson
- John Rose Troup
- William Bonny
- Edmund Musgrave Barttelot
- Herbert Ward
- Henry Morton Stanley
- John Henry
- Native woman

== Synopsis ==
Act 1

Bonny, Ward and Troup have just arrived after an arduous journey from London and are disappointed to find that Stanley has gone on ahead. They discover from Major Barttelot that they are to wait for Tippu Tib to bring 600 more porters before they can follow Stanley. The porters already in the camp, Zanzibaris and Soudanese, are diseased and many of them have been flogged for thieving. Ward and Troup are furious when Barttelot refuses to release provisions promised to them in London, on the basis that Stanley has left no explicit orders for them to be released. Later, Barttelot asks Bonny if he can recommend him as unfit for service as he hasn't been sleeping, mistakenly thinking that Bonny is a doctor. Bonny informs Barttelot that he is only a medical orderly, and couldn't make such a recommendation, but is fully in support of the major carrying on his duties. That evening, a goat is cooked especially to mark the arrival of the three officers. Barttelot, under the suggestion of Jameson, offers to give them half their provisions then, and the other half when they meet up with Stanley. The officers agree.

Act 2

Six months later. Ward is outside performing a flogging. Jameson is due back from a trip up the river to investigate rumours the Tippu Tib is nearby. Troup complains to Barttelot that Jameson is always absent during floggings and has always voted against them, on the grounds that enough of the porters are dying from disease already. Ward returns and says he is coming round to Jameson's point of view, and suggests they should try not flogging for a while. Troup agrees, but Bartellot is adamant that they should continue with the floggings, from which many people now have died. Jameson returns with no confirmation of Tippu Tib being near, but he has seen the remains of a cannibal feast. Troup demands that they talk about what they are going to do, arguing that Stanley couldn't possibly want them to wait indefinitely, particularly as medical supplies are running low. Barttelot insists that they must wait, as they have enough brass rods to pay the porters for another six months. Ward, who has been suffering from a fever, gets quickly worse and asks that Jameson stay next to him as he tries to sleep. A few days later, on Christmas Day, Ward is feeling better, and the officers all enjoy brandy and cigars.

Act 3

Six months later. A native woman is tied by the neck to a post, suspected of stealing morphine from the supplies tent while the guards were sleeping on duty. Bonny observes her while Ward makes a sculpture of her. Ward tells Bonny that he knows it was him who stole the morphine to help him sleep. Troup comes in, suffering terribly from a fever. Barttelot enters with two rotting fish, provided by the native woman's husband to buy her back, so he sets her free. Troup asks Barttelot for some quinine from Stanley's supplies, but Barttelot refuses. Jameson returns from another sortie to report that he has met Tippu Tib, who has promised he will be there in a month with the 600 porters, bringing great relief all round. Jameson then gives Troup his quinine. Ward suspects that Jameson is lying and when they are alone he quizzes him about the trip. Jameson admits that while he did meet Tippu Tib, but it was obvious that the promise he gave was a lie. Later that night, Barttelot confesses to Jameson that the day before he had attacked the native woman who beats drums every night in the camp and bitten her in the neck, then afterwards, with blood round his mouth, beaten his servant boy, John Henry. Bonny comes in and looks at Jameson's sketches from his trip. One sketch shows a young native girl tied to a tree. Jameson explains that, as he had never seen a cannibal feast, under Tippu Tib's suggestion he had bought the girl so that she could be given to a cannibalistic tribe, and he could sketch her being killed and eaten. The other men are shocked, and Jameson realises with horror what he has done. Barttelot is furious that, as Jameson had given copies of the sketches to Tippu Tib, the story will get out and his reputation will be ruined. In his rage Barttelot attacks John Henry and kills him, then runs outside to the beating drum where he is shot and killed by the porters. In the final scene of the play, Stanley has arrived, but only Bonny is left in the camp. Jameson has died of illness at a mission house, Ward has gone missing and Troup is on his way back to England.

== Original production ==
"The Rear Column" was first performed at the Globe Theatre in London (now the Gielgud Theatre) on 22 February 1978, directed by Harold Pinter, with the following cast:

- Bonny – Donald Gee
- Jameson – Jeremy Irons
- Ward – Simon Ward
- Troup – Clive Francis
- Barttelot – Barry Foster
- Stanley – Michael Forrest
- John Henry – Riba Akabusi
- Native Woman – Dorrett Thompson

=== Critical reception ===
The play experienced negative reviews and a run of only 44 performances, though Benedict Nightingale wrote in the New Statesman, "Besides Gray's writing, Harold Pinter's unemphatic directing and a remarkably consistent company supply a super-abundance of that unfashionable theatrical commodity, individual character."

== Off-Broadway ==
It was produced by the Manhattan Theatre Club at Stage 73, New York, on 7 November 1978, directed by James Hammerstein, with the following cast:

- Mr. W. Bonny - Josh Clark
- Mr. J.S. Jameson - John Horton
- Mr. H. Ward - Benjamin Hendrickson
- Mr. J.R. Troup - Paul Collins
- Maj. E. M. Barttelot - Remak Ramsay
- Mr. H.M. Stanley - Edward Seamon
- John Henry - Alvin Alexis
- Native Woman - Louise H. Gorham

=== Critical reception ===
The New York Times wrote, "Mr. Gray has abandoned the British intellectual suburbs and is hacking his way across rough country. His stride and pace are stylish and forceful; it is his bearings that sometimes fail...James Hammerstein directs with attention and variety that help compensate for the play”s considerable length and its tendency to reiterate its emotional points."

== Television ==
The Rear Column was recorded for television by the BBC and broadcast on 13 April 1980, directed by Harold Pinter. The cast was as follows:

- Bonny – Donald Gee
- Jameson – John Horton
- Ward – Simon Ward
- Troup – Clive Francis
- Barttelot – Barry Foster
- Stanley – Michael Forrest
- John Henry – Sylvester Williams
- Woman – Kamelia Nicol
- Boy – Alrick Riley

=== Critical reception ===
Screenonline described it as "a riveting studio recording of the Globe Theatre commission...Directed with verve by Pinter."
