= Attorney General v Blake =

English contract law case on damages for breach of contract

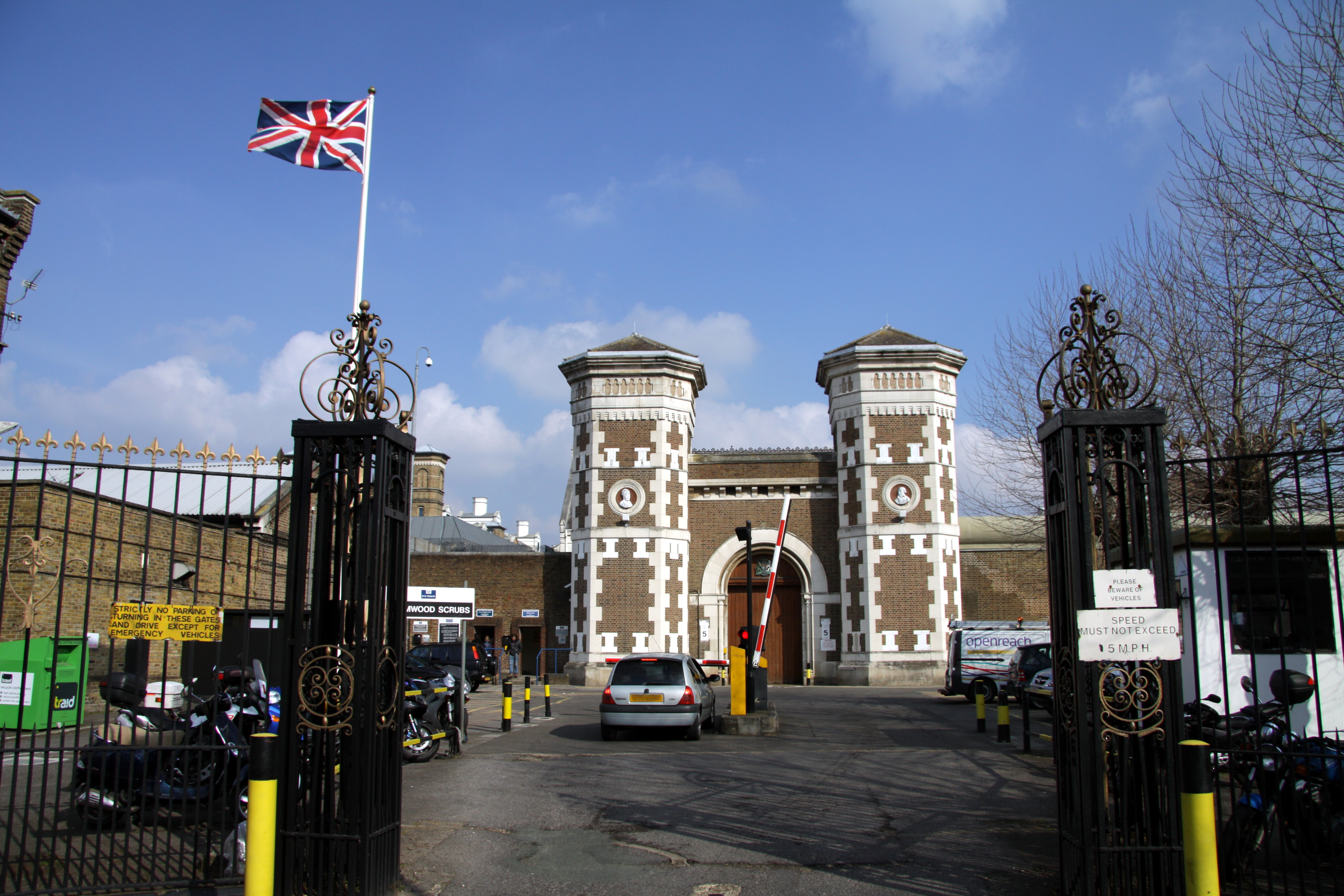
- HM Prison Wormwood Scrubs, which Blake escaped
- Court: House of Lords
- Full case name: Attorney General v Blake (Jonathan Cape Ltd Third Party)
- Decided: 27 July 2000
- Citations: [2000] UKHL 45, [2001] 1 AC 268
- Transcript: Full text of judgment

Case history
- Prior action: [1998] Ch 439

Court membership
- Judges sitting: Lord Nicholls, Lord Goff of Chieveley, Lord Browne-Wilkinson, Lord Steyn and Lord Hobhouse

Keywords
- Account of profits, breach of contract, restitution

Attorney General v Blake [2000] UKHL 45, [2001] 1 AC 268 is a leading English contract law case concerning damages for breach of contract. It established that in some circumstances, where ordinary remedies are inadequate, restitutionary damages may be awarded. Barrister Anthony de Garr Robinson KC states that the case "marked the beginning of a new chapter in [this field of] the law".

== Facts ==
George Blake was a member of the Secret Intelligence Service. He signed an Official Secrets Act 1911 declaration in his employment contract not to disclose information about his work, even after his employment ceased. In 1951, he became a Soviet agent. He was discovered in 1961 and the British government imprisoned him in Wormwood Scrubs. He escaped in 1966 and fled to the Soviet Union. He wrote a book about it and his secret services work called No Other Choice. He received a publishing contract for its release in 1989, with Jonathan Cape Ltd. The information in the book was no longer confidential. Blake received advanced payments and was entitled to more. The Crown brought an action for all the profits he made on the book including those that he had not yet received. It argued that a restitutionary principle should apply.

== Judgment ==
Lord Nicholls, Lord Goff of Chieveley, Lord Browne-Wilkinson and Lord Steyn held that in exceptional cases, when the normal remedy is inadequate to compensate for breach of contract, the court can order the defendant to account for all profits. This was an exceptional case in contract law, particularly because Blake had harmed the public interest. In addition to his double agency, publication was a further breach of the confidentiality clause, and disclosure of non-confidential information was a criminal offence under the Official Secrets Act 1911. An absolute rule against disclosure was necessary to ensure that the secret service was able to deal in complete confidence. It was in the Crown's legitimate interest to ensure Blake did not benefit from revealing state information. The House of Lords ruled that normal contractual remedies of damages, specific performance or injunction were not enough, and that the publishers should pay any money owing to Blake to the Crown.

=== Nicholls' judgment ===
In his judgment, Lord Nicholls stated that a breach of contract allows for the award of damages "when no financial loss flows from the infringement", comparing the present case to that of a case concerning the duty owed by a trustee or fiduciary. Highlighting the fact that "trustees and fiduciaries are financially disinterested in carrying out their duties... to this end they must not make any unauthorised profit", and that trustees and fiduciaries are accountable for "unauthorised profits", regardless of whether the beneficiaries have made a loss, he compared the case with Reading v. Attorney General [1951] AC 507, a case that involved a breach concerning another civil servant. Invoking the Chancery Amendment Act 1858, he stated that the court had a jurisdiction to "award damages when declining to grant equitable relief" in equity rather than in common law. Whilst "the common law courts' jurisdiction to award damages was confined to loss of injury flowing from a cause of action which had accrued before the writ was issued", equity allowed for "damages for loss of a bargaining opportunity or... the price payable for the compulsory acquisition of a right".

Outlining the law on remedies for breach, Nicholls states that damages are generally compensatory as per Robinson v Harman. However, damages awarded based on an innocent party's financial loss may not always be "adequate", recognising a party's interest in performance, as in the case of Wrotham Park damages. Whilst the Wrotham Park case concerned strictly property rights, the law had recently been extended to include personal rights in contract as well. Additionally, Nicholls diverged from some cases in allowing for plaintiffs, depending on the situation, to not only recoup profits already made from a breacher of contract but to claim all future profits as well. He states that a breach of confidence is an exceptional situation that allows for an injured party to claim "either compensatory damages or an account of the wrongdoer's profits", that only in similarly exceptional situations where ordinary remedies are inadequate "that any question of accounting for profits will arise", and that the allowing of such claims will require the court to regard:

all the circumstances, including the subject matter of the contract, the purpose of the contractual provision which has been breached, the circumstances in which the breach occurred, the consequences of the breach and the circumstances in which relief is being sought. A useful general guide, although not exhaustive, is whether the plaintiff had a legitimate interest in preventing the defendant's profit-making activity and, hence, in depriving him of his profit.

It would be difficult, and unwise, to attempt to be more specific....

Lord Woolf, at [1998] Ch 439, 457, 458, also suggested three facts which should not be a sufficient ground for departing from the normal basis on which damages are awarded: the fact that the breach was cynical and deliberate; the fact that the breach enabled the defendant to enter into a more profitable contract elsewhere; and the fact that by entering into a new and more profitable contract the defendant put it out of his power to perform his contract with the plaintiff. I agree that none of these facts would be, by itself, a good reason for ordering an account of profits.

On policy reasons, Nicholls states that the present case is one where a claim for profits made can be allowed:

Secret information is the lifeblood of these services. In the 1950s Blake deliberately committed repeated breaches of his undertaking not to divulge official information gained as a result of his employment. He caused untold and immeasurable damage to the public interest he had committed himself to serve. In 1990 he published his autobiography, a further breach of his express undertaking. By this time the information disclosed was no longer confidential. In the ordinary course of commercial dealings the disclosure of non-confidential information might be regarded as venial. In the present case disclosure was also a criminal offence under the Official Secrets Acts, even though the information was no longer confidential. Section 1 of the Official Secrets Act 1989 draws a distinction in this regard between members of the security and intelligence services and other Crown servants. Under section 1(3) a person who is or has been a Crown servant is guilty of an offence if without lawful authority he makes 'a damaging disclosure' of information relating to security or intelligence. The offence is drawn more widely in the case of a present or past member of the security and intelligence services. Such a person is guilty of an offence if without lawful authority he discloses 'any information' relating to security or intelligence which is or has been in his possession by virtue of his position as a member of those services. This distinction was approved in Parliament after debate when the legislation was being enacted.

[...]

As a footnote I observe that a similar conclusion, requiring the contract-breaker to disgorge his profits, was reached in the majority decision of the United States Supreme Court in Snepp v. United States (1980) 444 U.S. 507. The facts were strikingly similar. A former employee of the Central Intelligence Agency, whose conditions of employment included a promise not to divulge any information relating to the agency without pre-publication clearance, published a book about the agency's activities in Vietnam. None of the information was classified, but an agent's violation of his non-disclosure obligation impaired the agency's ability to function properly. The court considered and rejected various forms of relief. The actual damage was not quantifiable, nominal damages were a hollow alternative, and punitive damages after a jury trial would be speculative and unusual. Even if recovered they would bear no relation to either the government's irreparable loss or Snepp's unjust gain. The court considered that a remedy which required Snepp 'to disgorge the benefits of his faithlessness', was swift and sure, tailored to deter those who would place sensitive information at risk and, since the remedy reached only funds attributable to the breach, it could not saddle the former agent with exemplary damages out of all proportion to his gain. In order to achieve this result the court 'imposed' a constructive trust on Snepp's profits. In this country, affording the plaintiff the remedy of an account of profits is a different means to the same end.

=== Steyn's judgment ===
Lord Goff and Lord Browne-Wilkinson agreed. Lord Steyn gave a concurring opinion:

My Lords, it has been held at first instance and in the Court of Appeal that Blake is not a fiduciary. This is not an issue before the House. But, as my noble and learned friend Lord Nicholls of Birkenhead has observed, the present case is closely analogous to that of fiduciaries: compare Reading v. Attorney-General [1951] AC 507. If the information was still confidential, Blake would in my view have been liable as a fiduciary. That would be so despite the fact that he left the intelligence services many years ago. The distinctive feature of this case is, however, that Blake gave an undertaking not to divulge any information, confidential or otherwise, obtained by him during his work in the intelligence services. This obligation still applies to Blake. He was, therefore in regard to all information obtained by him in the intelligence services, confidential or not, in a very similar position to a fiduciary. The reason of the rule applying to fiduciaries applies to him. Secondly, I bear in mind that the enduring strength of the common law is that it has been developed on a case-by-case basis by judges for whom the attainment of practical justice was a major objective of their work. It is still one of the major moulding forces of judicial decision-making. These observations are almost banal: the public would be astonished if it was thought that judges did not conceive it as their prime duty to do practical justice whenever possible. A recent example of this process at work is White v. Jones [1995] 2 AC 207 where by a majority the House of Lords held that a solicitor who caused loss to a third party by negligence in the preparation of a will is liable in damages. Subordinating conceptual difficulties to the needs of practical justice a majority, and notably Lord Goff of Chieveley, at pp. 259G-260H, upheld the claim. For my part practical justice strongly militates in favour of granting an order for disgorgement of profits against Blake. The decision of the United States Supreme Court in Snepp v. United States (1980) 444 U.S. 507 is instructive. On very similar facts the Supreme Court imposed a constructive trust on the intelligence officer's profits. Our law is also mature enough to provide a remedy in such a case but does so by the route of the exceptional recognition of a claim for disgorgement of profits against the contract breaker. In my view therefore there is a valid claim vesting in the Attorney-General against Blake for disgorgement of his gain.

=== Hobhouse's dissenting judgment ===
Lord Hobhouse dissented. He asserted that the Crown had no proprietary right to the money and as such had suffered no loss so as to receive restitutionary damages. Instead, he argued that compensatory damages, not a full account of profit, were appropriate:

I cannot join your Lordships in that conclusion. I have two primary difficulties. The first is the facts of the present case. The speech of my noble and learned friend explores what is the "just response" to the defendant's conduct. The "just response" visualised in the present case is, however it is formulated, that Blake should be punished and deprived of any fruits of conduct connected with his former criminal and reprehensible conduct. The Crown have made no secret of this. It is not a commercial claim in support of any commercial interest. It is a claim relating to past criminal conduct. The way it was put by the Court of Appeal [1998] Ch 439, 464 was:

"The ordinary member of the public would be shocked if the position was that the courts were powerless to prevent [Blake] profiting from his criminal conduct."

The answer given by my noble and learned friend does not reflect the essentially punitive nature of the claim and seeks to apply principles of law which are only appropriate where commercial or proprietary interests are involved. Blake has made a financial gain but he has not done so at the expense of the Crown or making use of any property of or commercial interest of the Crown either in law or equity.

My second difficulty is that the reasoning of my noble and learned friend depends upon the conclusion that there is some gap in the existing state of the law which requires to be filled by a new remedy. He accepts that the term "restitutionary damages" is unsatisfactory but, with respect, does not fully examine why this is so, drawing the necessary conclusions.

The cross-appeal has to be determined on the basis that the only civil cause of action which the Crown has against Blake is a bare legal cause of action in contract for breach of contract in that he failed in 1989 to observe the negative undertaking which he gave in 1944. As already observed, it is recognised by Blake that the Crown had at the least a good arguable case for the grant of an injunction against him at that time. In other words it was a breach of contract - breach of a negative undertaking - liable to be restrained by injunction, i.e. specifically enforced.

But the Crown did not apply for an injunction at the time it would have done some good and quite probably stopped the publication of the book. This is the source of the problems for the Crown in achieving its purpose in bringing these proceedings....

The concepts of restitution and compensation are not the same though they will on occasions fulfil the same need. Restitution is analogous to property: it concerns wealth or advantage which ought to be returned or transferred by the defendant to the plaintiff. It is a form of specific implement. Its clearest form is an order for the return or transfer of property which belongs in law or in equity to the plaintiff. Property includes an interest in property. Then there are rights recognised in equity such as those which arise from a fiduciary relationship. These rights give rise to restitutionary remedies including the remedy of account which, depending on the circumstances, could also derive from a common law relationship such as agency. Then, again, there are the rights now grouped under the heading of the law of restitution or unjust enrichment. These are still truly restitutionary concepts leading to restitutionary remedies. Typically they require the payment of money by the person unjustly enriched to the person at whose expense that enrichment has taken place. In so far as the appropriate remedy is the payment of money or the delivery up of a chattel or goods is concerned the common law could provide it; insofar as it required some other remedy or the recognition of an equitable right, the chancery jurisdiction had to be invoked.

The essential of such rights and their enforcement was the procuring by the courts of the performance by the defendant of his obligations. The plaintiff recovers what he is actually entitled to not some monetary substitute for it. If what the plaintiff is entitled to is wealth expressed in monetary terms, the order will be for the payment of money but this does not alter the character of the remedy or of the right being recognised. He gets the money because it was his property or he was in some other way entitled to it. It is still the enforced performance of an obligation. The same is the case where an injunction is granted or a decree of specific performance or the ordering of an account.

It is this class of rights which the Crown is unable to invoke as a result of the judgment of the Vice-Chancellor upheld by the Court of Appeal. There is no obligation of Blake left to perform or which now can be enforced. That time passed with the failure to apply for an injunction in 1989 or 1990. The Crown has no right to an injunction to stop the payment of the royalty to Blake and procure its payment to the Crown instead. The Crown has no right to the royalty and does not now assert one.

The law, including equity, provides extensive and effective remedies for protecting and enforcing property rights. It is no criticism of the law that they are not available now to the Crown. The Crown does not have the substantive rights to support such remedies.

== See also ==
Termination and restitution cases

- Ruxley Electronics & Construction v Forsyth [1996] AC 344
- Experience Hendrix LLC v PPX Enterprises Inc [2003] EWCA Civ 323, [2003] 1 All ER (Comm) 830

Trusts cases

- Keech v Sandford (1726) 25 ER 223
- Boardman v Phipps, the strict fiduciary duty in English trusts law to have no possibility of a conflict of interest

== Other cases ==
- World Wide Fund for Nature v World Wrestling Federation Entertainment Inc [2007] EWCA Civ 286
- Nottingham University v Fischel [2000] EWHC 221 (QB), [2000] IRLR 471, where an employee was held to be under no general fiduciary duty to refrain from undertaking outside private clinic work, but did breach a fiduciary duty where he had directed junior university staff to assist him in that outside work. The latter created a conflict of interest, whereas the former did not since patients would not have used the University's services.
- Hospital Products Ltd v United States Surgical Corporation [1984] HCA 64, (1984) 156 CLR 41 (25 October 1984), High Court (Australia), a senior executive of an American company, Mr Blackman, was held liable to pay heavy compensation for breach of contract for copying the invention of the company when he found it was unpatented in Australia. But, the Australian High Court held Mr Blackman (and his company, Hospital Products Ltd) was not liable to disgorge profits unless some "fiduciary" relationship could be identified. Deane J dissented, holding there could be an account of profits. Peter Birks, an expert in the field of restitutionary damages, has supported the dissent.
- Adras Building Material Ltd v Harlow & Jones GmbH [1995] RLR 235: the Israel Supreme Court held a person liable for account of profits after breach of an employment contract.
