= Jeremy Meadow =

British theatrical producer (active 1999– )

Jeremy Meadow is a British theatrical producer and director, working mainly in theatre and comedy.

He studied at Merchant Taylors' School, Northwood then University of Exeter and Bristol Old Vic Theatre School. He worked for BBC radio as a producer on The Archers and at the Royal Opera House as a staff producer.

His first theatre production in the West End was The Gin Game with Joss Ackland and Dorothy Tutin at the Savoy Theatre in 1999. Further West End productions and co-productions include A Servant to Two Masters at the Albery Theatre, Macbeth with Sean Bean directed by Edward Hall at the Albery Theatre, Three Sisters with Kristin Scott Thomas directed by Michael Blakemore at the Playhouse Theatre, Otherwise Engaged by Simon Gray with Richard E. Grant at the Criterion Theatre and Donkeys' Years by Michael Frayn at the Comedy Theatre.

Notable touring productions include The Circle by W. Somerset Maugham with Wendy Craig, Our Song by Keith Waterhouse with Peter Bowles directed by Ned Sherrin, The Old Ladies by Rodney Ackland with Siân Phillips and Angela Thorne directed by Frith Banbury, as well as a number of comedies by Eric Chappell. Currently he is producing Blonde Bombshells of 1943 by Alan Plater.

More recently, he has produced and managed comedy presentations including tours of comedians Gina Yashere and Tim FitzHigham, and Sandi Toksvig and Bonnie Langford in Short & Curly.

As of April 2022, he is a member of the Society of London Theatre and one of the trustees of its Theatre Development Trust.
