= The Caramel Crisis =

1966 British TV drama

- Genre: Drama
- Written by: Simon Gray
- Directed by: Naomi Capon
- Starring: George Cole; Richard Pearson; John Le Mesurier; Bryan Pringle; Kynaston Reeves; Barbara Miller; Rosamund Greenwood; Edna Petrie; Winifred Dennis
- Country of origin: United Kingdom
- Original language: English

Production
- Producer: Harry Moore
- Running time: 30 minutes
- Production company: BBC

Original release
- Network: BBC
- Release: 25 April 1966

The Caramel Crisis was a one-off BBC television drama by Simon Gray, produced as part of the BBC's Thirty-Minute Theatre series. It was Simon Gray's first dramatic work, adapted from his own short story, and was first broadcast live on 25 April 1966 starring George Cole, Richard Pearson, John Le Mesurier and Bryan Pringle. A recording has not been preserved.

== Plot ==
Caramel (George Cole) goes for an interview for the position of a doctor at a factory for the company Healman and Co. Despite drifting into daydreams during his interview with company board members, Cloon (Richard Pearson), Lame (John Le Mesurier) and McWithers (Bryan Pringle), he is hired for the job. When he moves into the company flat, however, he spends all his time taking baths and watching westerns on television, and refuses to go to the factory and get on with his job. The board members become increasingly worried about the new appointment and decide not to tell the company chairman, Sir Roy (Kynaston Reeves), unless it is absolutely necessary. Caramel proves immovable, however, and starts billing the company for cigarettes, éclairs, whisky, Turkish delight and other luxuries. Cloon is the first to crack, writing to Sir Roy about the mistake. We discover that Caramel is not really a doctor at all and has stolen his dead brother's identity. Sir Roy comes to the factory and beats on Caramel's door, but his fury at the man's behaviour causes him to collapse out of his wheelchair and die, leaving the board members to struggle for control of the company.
