= Quartermaine's Terms =

1987 film by Bill Hays

- Poster original West End production
- Original language: English
- Written by: Simon Gray
- Genre: Drama

Premiere
- Date: 30 July 1981
- Place: Queen's Theatre, London
- Official website

Quartermaine's Terms is a play by Simon Gray which won The Cheltenham Prize in 1982.

== Plot ==
The play takes place over a period of two years in the 1960s in the staffroom at a Cambridge school for teaching English to foreigners. It deals with the relationships between seven teachers at the school, in particular that between St John Quartermaine and the others. The dominant theme is loneliness, and during the course of the play all of the characters experience the trauma of being or feeling alone. Mark’s wife leaves him; Derek, from Hull, finds Cambridge initially unwelcoming; Eddie is ultimately bereaved by the loss of a partner; Anita’s husband is a philanderer; Henry is trapped in a dysfunctional nuclear family and Melanie is similarly trapped caring for a mother whom she despises. Quartermaine is a painfully lonely bachelor, seemingly with no friends other than his colleagues at the school. Although the play is at times highly comic, it has a very serious theme; and the struggles of each character with their own types of loneliness are moving and sad. Above all, Quartermaine is an increasingly pathetic figure lost in his own confused thoughts – and ultimately deserted. His future as the play closes is poignantly bleak.

== Original production ==
It was first staged on 30 July 1981 at the Queen’s Theatre, London.

Role	Actor
St. John Quartermaine	Edward Fox
Anita Manchip	Jenny Quayle
Mark Sackling	Peter Birch
Eddie Loomis	Robin Bailey
Derek Meadle	Glyn Grain
Henry Windscape	James Grout
Melanie Garth	Prunella Scales

- Director: Harold Pinter
- Producer: Michael Codron
- Designer: Eileen Diss
- Lighting: Leonard Tucker

Critical reception

The Stage wrote, "Simon Gray has written the best play of his notable career, a delicate, moving and yet consistently funny piece, eloquently directed by Harold Pinter, which depicts the English penchant for quiet suffering with immense skill."

== Off-Broadway ==
The play was staged on 24 February 1983 at Playhouse 91 Theater, New York in a production by Long Wharf Theatre.

Role	Actor
St. John Quartermaine	Remak Ramsay
Anita Manchip	Caroline Lagerfelt
Mark Sackling	Kelsey Grammer
Eddie Loomis	Roy Poole
Derek Meadle	Anthony Heald
Henry Windscape	John Cunningham
Melanie Garth	Dana Ivey

- Producers: John A. McQuiggan & Ethel Watt
- Director: Kenneth Frankel
- Settings: David Jenkins
- Costumes: Bill Walker
- Lighting: Pat Collins

Critical reception

The New York Times called it "a play that is at once full of doom and gloom and bristling with wry, even uproarious comedy. The mixture is so artfully balanced that we really don't know where the laughter ends and the tears begin: the playwright is in full possession of that Chekhovian territory where the tragedies and absurdities of life become one and the same."

== TV adaptation ==
Quartermaine's Terms
- Written by: Simon Gray (play); Simon Gray (adaptation)
- Starring: John Gielgud; Edward Fox; Eleanor Bron; Clive Francis; Tessa Peake-Jones; Peter Jeffrey; Paul Jesson
- Theme music composer: Jeremy Nicholas
- Country of origin: United Kingdom
- Original language: English

Production
- Cinematography: John McGlashan

Original release
- Release: 29 March 1987

A film was broadcast on BBC Two in 1987, as part of the Screen Two series.

Role	Actor
Melanie Garth	Eleanor Bron
St. John (pronounced Sinjin) Quartermaine	Edward Fox
Mark Sackling	Clive Francis
Eddie Loomis	John Gielgud
Henry Windscape	Peter Jeffrey
Derek Meadle	Paul Jesson
Anita Manchip	Tessa Peake-Jones
Oko-Ri	Eiji Kusuhara

- Producer: Louis Marks
- Director: Bill Hays

== Radio adaptations ==
- The play was presented on BBC Radio 3 on 26 May 1991.

Role	Actor
St. John Quartermaine	Michael Williams
Henry Windscape	Peter Jeffery
Eddie Loomis	Robin Bailey
Melanie Garth	Marcia Warren
Mark Sackling	Nigel Anthony
Anita Manchip	Helena Breck
Derek Meadle	Jon Strickland

- Director: Gordon House
- The play was presented on BBC Radio 4 on Saturday 17 June 2006.

Role	Actor
Quartermaine	Michael Palin
Anita	Francesca Faridany
Mark	James Fleet
Eddie	Clive Francis
Derek	Andrew Lincoln
Henry	David Yelland
Melanie	Harriet Walter

- Producer: Catherine Bailey
- Director: Maria Aitken

== West End revival ==
The play opened at Wyndham's Theatre on 23 January 2013, after brief runs at Theatre Royal, Brighton, and the Theatre Royal, Bath.

Role	Actor
St. John Quartermaine	Rowan Atkinson
Anita Manchip	Louise Ford
Mark Sackling	Matthew Cottle
Eddie Loomis	Malcolm Sinclair
Derek Meadle	Will Keen
Henry Windscape	Conleth Hill
Melanie Garth	Felicity Montagu

- Director: Richard Eyre
- Producer: Michael Codron

Critical reception

The Guardian noted "a rueful social comedy that stands up well to revival and gives star billing to Rowan Atkinson, who reminds us in his first straight play in 25 years that he is a highly capable actor"; while The Daily Telegraph wrote "there’s a delight in watching a playwright so in control of his craft that he holds you riveted in a world where only the silence seems to scream."
