= George Blake =

British/Soviet espionage agent (1922–2020)

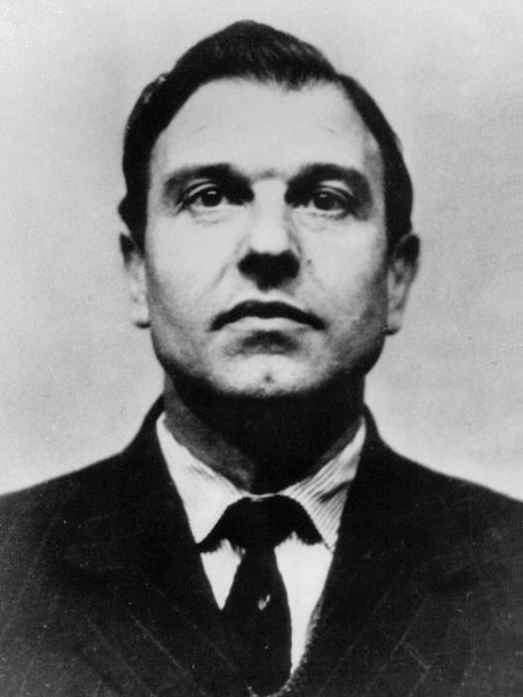
- Born: George Behar; 11 November 1922; Rotterdam, Netherlands
- Died: 26 December 2020 (aged 98); Moscow, Russia
- Education: Downing College, Cambridge
- Military career
- Allegiance: United Kingdom; Soviet Union; Russia
- Branch: Naval Intelligence Division; MI6; MGB; KGB; SVR
- Rank: Polkovnik (Colonel)
- Known for: Espionage; Double agent Treason

George Blake (né Behar; 11 November 1922 – 26 December 2020) was a spy who worked for Britain's Secret Intelligence Service (MI6) and became a double agent for the Soviet Union. Captured during the Korean War, he was imprisoned by North Korean forces and became a communist, deciding to work for the Ministry of State Security (MGB). Upon returning to the United Kingdom, he resumed work with MI6 while secretly passing classified information to the Soviets, betraying dozens of agents working on the eastern side of the Iron Curtain.

Blake was eventually discovered in 1961 and sentenced to 42 years in prison, one of the longest terms ever imposed for espionage in Britain. In 1966, with the help of fellow inmates and outside supporters, he escaped from HM Prison Wormwood Scrubs in West London. He fled the country and made his way to the Soviet Union, where he was received as a hero.

Although not part of the Cambridge Five, Blake later associated with members such as Donald Maclean and Kim Philby after arriving in Moscow. He continued to live in the Soviet Union and, after its dissolution in 1991, remained in Russia. Blake was granted citizenship and lived out the rest of his life there, defending his actions until his death in 2020 at the age of 98.

== Early life ==
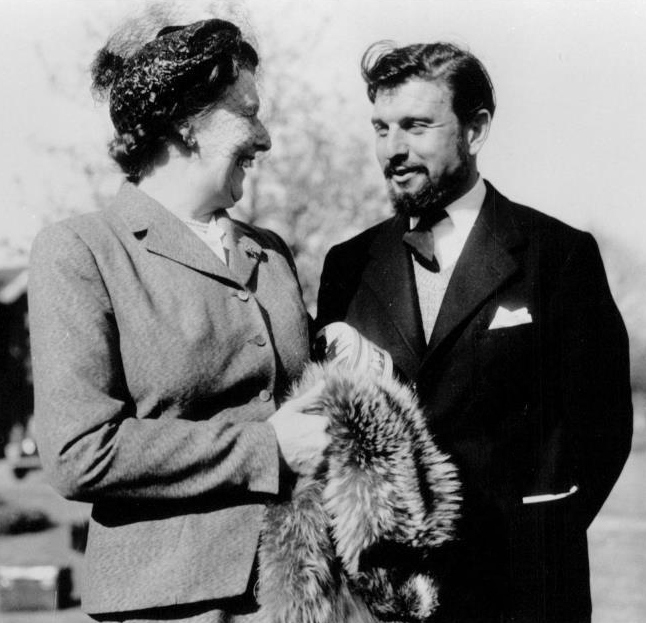
Blake with his mother upon his return to the UK in 1953

George Blake was born George Behar in Rotterdam, the Netherlands in 1922. He was the son of a Protestant Dutch mother, Catherine (née Beijderwellen), and Albert Behar, a Constantinople-born Sephardi Jew who was a naturalised British subject. He was named George after George V of the United Kingdom. Albert Behar served in the British Army during the First World War. While Albert received the Meritorious Service Medal, he embellished his war service when recounting it to his wife and children, and concealed his Jewish background until his death. The Behars lived a comfortable existence in the Netherlands until Albert's death in 1936. The thirteen-year-old Behar was sent to live with a wealthy aunt, his father's sister Zephira, in Egypt, where he attended the English School in Cairo.

While in Cairo, he was close to his cousin Henri Curiel, who was later to become a leader of the Communist Democratic Movement for National Liberation in Egypt. In 1991, Blake said that his encounter with Curiel, who was a decade older and already a Marxist, shaped his views in later life.

When the Second World War broke out, Behar was back in the Netherlands. In 1940, Germany invaded and quickly defeated the Dutch military. Behar was interned but released because he was only 17, and joined the Dutch resistance as a courier. In 1942, he escaped from the Netherlands and travelled to Britain via Spain and Gibraltar, reaching London in January 1943. There, he was reunited with his mother and his sisters, who had fled at the start of the war. In 1943, his mother decided to change the family name from Behar to Blake.

== Espionage activities ==
After he reached Britain, Blake joined the Royal Navy as a sub-lieutenant before being recruited by the Secret Intelligence Service (MI6) in 1944. For the rest of the war, Blake was employed in the Dutch Section. He intended to marry an MI6 secretary, Iris Peake, but her family prevented the marriage because of Blake's Jewish background and the relationship ended.

In 1946, he was posted to Hamburg and put in charge of the interrogation of German U-boat captains. In 1947, the Navy sent Blake to study languages, including Russian, at Downing College, Cambridge, where his fellow students included the future foreign policy analyst Michael MccGwire.

He was posted thereafter to the British legation in Seoul, South Korea, under Vyvyan Holt, arriving on 6 November 1948. Under cover as a vice-consul, Blake's mission was to gather intelligence on Communist North Korea, Communist China, and the Soviet Far East.

The Korean War broke out on 25 June 1950, and Seoul was quickly captured by the advancing Korean People's Army of the North. After British forces joined the United Nations Command defending the South, Blake and the other British diplomats were taken prisoner. As the tide of the war turned, Blake and the others were taken north, first to Pyongyang and then to the Yalu River. After seeing the bombing of North Korea, and after reading the works of Karl Marx and others during his three-year detention, he became a communist.

At a secret meeting arranged with his guards, he volunteered to work for the Soviet Union's spy service, the MGB. In an interview, Blake was once asked: "Is there one incident that triggered your decision to effectively change sides?" Blake responded,

It was the relentless bombing of small Korean villages by enormous American Flying Fortresses. Women and children and old people, because the young men were in the army. We might have been victims ourselves. It made me feel ashamed of belonging to these overpowering, technically superior countries fighting against what seemed to me defenceless people. I felt I was on the wrong side… that it would be better for humanity if the Communist system prevailed, that it would put an end to war.

In his first interview, in 1990, with Tom Bower for 'The Confession', a BBC TV documentary, Blake said that he had been tempted towards communism during his Russian course in Cambridge while serving with MI6, and had been finally convinced while reading Karl Marx's Das Kapital during his imprisonment in North Korea.

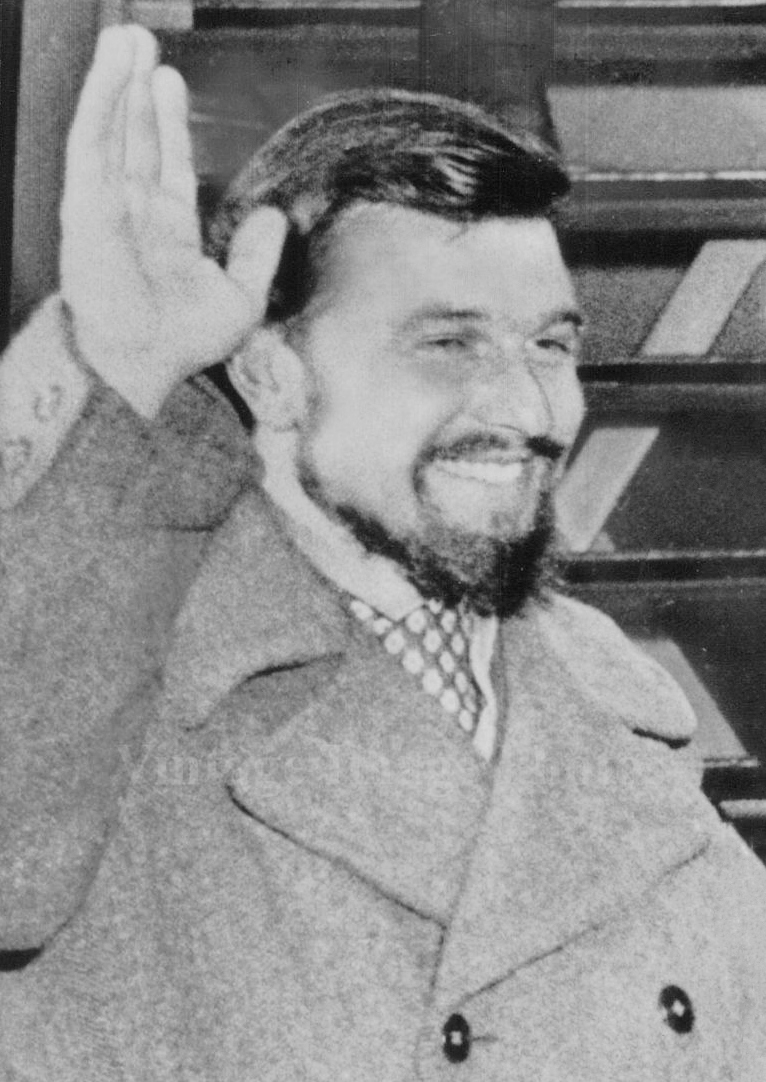
Blake after returning from Korea in 1953

Following his release in 1953, Blake returned to Britain as a hero, landing at RAF Abingdon. In October 1954, he married MI6 secretary Gillian Allan in St Mark's Church, North Audley Street in London. In 1955, he was sent by MI6 to work as a case officer in Berlin, where his task was to recruit Soviet officers as double agents. Blake informed his KGB contacts of the details of British and American operations, including Operation Gold in which a tunnel into East Berlin was used to tap telephone lines used by the Soviet military, and the similar Operation Silver by the British in Vienna. He was called Agent Diomid. To protect Blake from exposure, the Soviets decided not to "discover" the tunnel until it had been in operation for nearly a year. According to the author of a 2019 book about the operation, the Soviets "value[d] Blake so much, they fear[ed] his exposure more than they fear[ed] a breach of their secrets".

Over nine years, Blake is said to have betrayed details of some forty MI6 agents to the KGB, destroying most of MI6's operations in Eastern Europe, although this remains unsubstantiated. Blake later said of this, "I don't know what I handed over because it was so much". In the same TV interview, Blake claimed to have betrayed 500 British agents. In 1959 Blake became aware of a Central Intelligence Agency mole inside GRU and was possibly instrumental in exposing Pyotr Popov, who was executed in 1960.

Although Blake's espionage during the Cold War is famous and has regularly been pored over, it has been in a less detailed way than the Cambridge Five spy ring, because "Blake was never part of this [elite] class-ridden inner circle", according to an article by The Guardian after Blake's death. "Born in Rotterdam to a Dutch mother and an Egyptian Jewish father [he] was never considered one of them".

== Discovery and conviction ==
In 1961, Blake fell under suspicion after revelations by Polish defector Michael Goleniewski and others. He was arrested when he arrived in London after being summoned from Lebanon, where he had been enrolled at the Middle East Centre for Arab Studies (MECAS). Three days into his interrogation, Blake denied that he was tortured or blackmailed by the North Koreans. Without thinking about what he was saying, he stated that he had switched sides voluntarily. He then gave his MI6 interrogators a full confession.

The maximum sentence for an offence under section 1 of the Official Secrets Act 1911 is 14 years, but his activities were divided into five time periods charged as five offences and in May 1961 after a trial at the Old Bailey in camera, he was sentenced to the maximum term of 14 years consecutively on each of three counts of spying for a potential enemy and 14 years concurrently on both the two remaining counts – a total of 42 years imprisonment – by the Lord Chief Justice, Lord Parker of Waddington. This sentence was reported by newspapers to represent one year for each of the agents who were killed when he betrayed them, although this is dubious. It was the longest non-life sentence ever handed down by a British court.

== Escape from prison ==
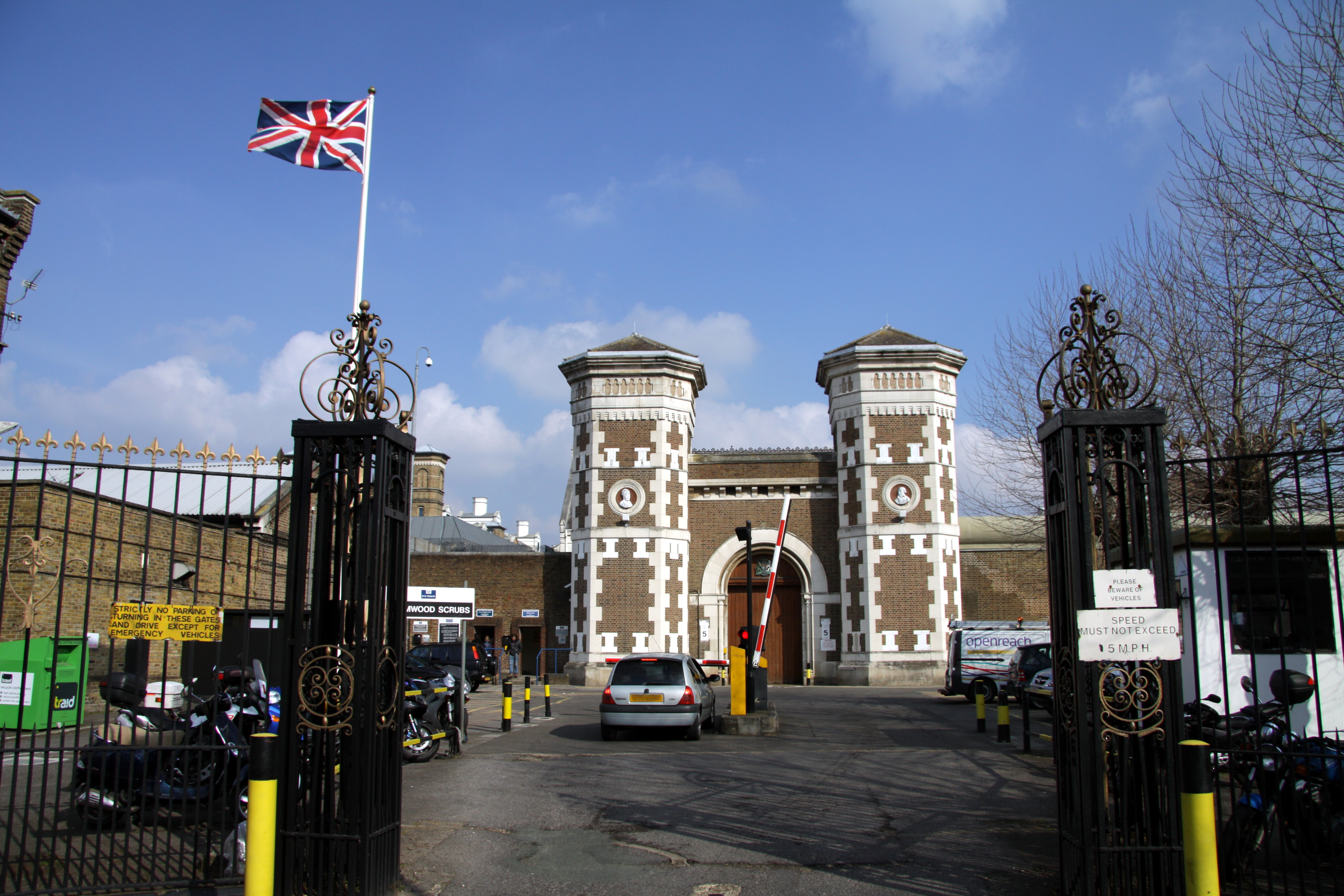
HM Prison Wormwood Scrubs in west London, from which Blake escaped in 1966

Five years into his imprisonment in Wormwood Scrubs, Blake escaped with the help of three men he had met in prison, Sean Bourke and two anti-nuclear campaigners, Michael Randle and Pat Pottle. The escape was masterminded by Bourke, who first approached Randle only for financial help with the escape. Randle became more involved and suggested they bring Pottle in on the plan as well, as he had suggested springing Blake to Randle in 1962, when they were still in prison. Their motives for helping Blake to escape were their belief that the 42-year sentence was "inhuman" and because of a liking of Blake. Several sources also state that the plan was financed by film director Tony Richardson.

Bourke had smuggled a walkie-talkie to Blake to communicate with him while in prison. On 22 October 1966, Blake broke a window at the end of the corridor where his cell was located. Then between 6:00 p.m. and 7:00 p.m., while most of the other inmates and guards were at the weekly film show, Blake climbed through the window, slid down a porch and made his way to the perimeter wall. There, Bourke, who had been released from the prison earlier, threw a rope ladder over the wall. Blake then used it to climb over the wall and they drove off. During the escape, Blake fractured his wrist jumping from the perimeter wall but apart from that it all went according to plan. They reached the safe house, a bedsit, within twenty minutes. Back in the Wormwood Scrubs, the prisoners celebrated the escape.

After the escape, it became apparent that the safe house was not suitable long term, as it was cleaned by the landlady once a week. Blake then spent several days moving between Randle and Pottle's friends' houses, including that of Rev. John Papworth in Earls Court. Blake and Bourke moved in with Pottle, staying with him while preparing to get out of the country. They smuggled Blake across the English Channel in a camper van, then drove across northern Europe and through West Germany to the Helmstedt–Marienborn border crossing. Having crossed the border without incident, Blake met his handlers in East Germany and completed his escape to the Soviet Union.

Pottle and Randle were not prosecuted until 1991. Their defence was a claim of moral justification for aiding Blake, whose 42-year sentence they considered to be excessively long and "inhuman". Despite being directed that they must find the men guilty, the jury acquitted them, an act known as jury nullification in which a jury uses its absolute discretion to find as it sees fit. Bourke was not prosecuted for his role since Ireland refused to extradite him to the United Kingdom to face charges that were political in nature.

== Moscow ==
In November 1966, his wife Gillian, with whom he had three children, began divorce proceedings against him and in March 1967 Mr Justice Orr granted a decree nisi in Blake's absence, on the grounds that the conviction of a spouse for treason can amount to cruelty or constructive desertion. Custody of their three sons was awarded to Gillian. This caused Blake a good deal of grief, though he knew that Gillian would have struggled to settle into life in the Soviet Union.

In 1990, Blake published the autobiography No Other Choice. The book's British publisher had paid him approximately £60,000 before the government intervened to stop him profiting from sales. The amount seized by the government was £90,000. He later filed a complaint charging the British government with a human rights violation for taking nine years to decide on his case and was awarded £5,000 in compensation by the European Court of Human Rights. In 1991, Blake testified by video recording when Randle and Pottle were put on trial for aiding his escape. They were acquitted. In an interview with NBC News in 1991, Blake said he regretted the deaths of the agents he had betrayed.

In a 1992 interview for the programme As It Happens, aired by Canada's CBC Radio, Blake praised the general concept of communism. He said that he had offered his services to the Soviet Union because he viewed communism as "a great experiment of mankind, to create a more just society, to create, in fact, the kingdom of God in this world". During this discussion, he denied responsibility for the deaths of any British agents, having been assured by the Soviets that none were executed based on the intelligence that he had provided, assurances he accepted. According to NPR, "Blake gave up the identities of hundreds of British spies, some of whom were executed".

In the 1992 CNN series Cold War, the former KGB general, Oleg Kalugin, remarked "George Blake had that innocent mind, in a sense. He's still a very naïve man. He didn't want to know that many people he betrayed were executed. And I think we discussed this subject at one point, and he wouldn't believe it. He would say, 'Well, I was told that this would not happen!' It did happen. He was not told".

Blake married again, in 1968, to Ida Mikhailovna Kareyeva with whom he had one child. He also reconciled with his other children. In late 2007, Blake was awarded the Order of Friendship on his 85th birthday by Vladimir Putin. Blake's later book, Transparent Walls (2006), was reported by the daily Vzglyad ("The View"). Sergei Lebedev, the director of the Foreign Intelligence Service (SVR) of the Russian Federation, wrote in the book's foreword that despite the book's being devoted to the past, it is about the present as well. He also wrote that Blake, the 85-year-old colonel of foreign intelligence, "still takes an active role in the affairs of the secret service".

In 2012, Blake celebrated his 90th birthday, still living in Moscow on a KGB pension. His eyesight was failing and he described himself as "virtually blind". He remained a Marxist–Leninist. Blake denied being a traitor, insisting that he had never felt British: "To betray, you first have to belong. I never belonged."

Five years later, Blake remained committed to Russia and to communism. In a November 2017 statement, he claimed that its spies now have "the difficult and critical mission" of saving the world "in a situation when the danger of nuclear war and the resulting self-destruction of humankind again have been put on the agenda by irresponsible politicians. It's a true battle between good and evil".

== Death ==
Blake died on 26 December 2020, aged 98, in Moscow. The RIA Novosti news agency first reported Blake's death, citing the SVR. "We received some bitter news—the legendary George Blake passed away", it said. The Russian President, Vladimir Putin, an ex-KGB agent, expressed his "deep condolences" to Blake's family and friends. In a message published on the Kremlin website, the Russian leader noted Blake's "invaluable contribution to ensuring strategic parity and maintaining peace on the planet". Putin also said of Blake, "Colonel Blake was a brilliant professional of special vitality and courage". Blake was buried with military honours at Moscow's Troyekurovskoye Cemetery, in its Alley of Heroes, under the name Georgy Ivanovich Bekhter, the name with which he lived from 1965. Blake is commemorated on a sculpture honouring intelligence officers outside the SVR's headquarters in Moscow.

== Cultural references ==
Desmond Bagley's 1971 novel The Freedom Trap and its screen version, John Huston's The Mackintosh Man from 1973, were loosely based on Blake's prison escape.

For his novel Tinker Tailor Soldier Spy John le Carré used Blake's foreign background ("half a Dutchman and half a Jew") as partial inspiration for the characters of Toby Esterhase and Roy Bland. Le Carré later recalled "when I started putting together my little bestiary of suspects, I made sure there were at least two of them ... who were alienated by birth from the class structure that they served."

The play Cell Mates (1995) by Simon Gray is about Blake and Sean Bourke. The original production starred Stephen Fry as Blake and Rik Mayall as Bourke. The production was thrown into turmoil when Fry left the production following a bad review. Alfred Hitchcock planned to make a film, The Short Night, based on Blake, but died before doing so.

In 2015, BBC Storyville made a documentary about Blake at the age of 92, which included interviews with Blake. The film was titled Storyville: Masterspy of Moscow – George Blake. In 2021 the BBC radio play Breaking Blake by Barnaby Kay was broadcast. It covers his escape from prison and his flight to a Czechoslovak border post with East Germany in a camper van's hidden compartment.

George Blake appears as a character in Ian McEwan's novel The Innocent.

== See also ==
- Attorney General v Blake

== Sources ==
- Blake, George (1990). No Other Choice. London: Jonathan Cape. ISBN 0-224-03067-1.
- Hermiston, Roger (2013). The Greatest Traitor: The Secret Lives of Agent George Blake. London: Aurum Press. ISBN 978-1-78131-046-5.
- Kuper, Simon (2021). The Happy Traitor. Spies, Lies and Exile in Russia: The Extraordinary Story of George Blake. London: Profile. ISBN 978-1-78125-937-5.
