= The Old Masters (play) =

- Poster for original production
- Original language: English
- Written by: Simon Gray
- Genre: Drama
- Setting: Villa I Tatti, near Florence, 1937

Premiere
- Date: 4 June 2004
- Place: Birmingham Repertory Theatre
- Official website

The Old Masters is a play by Simon Gray about the art critic Bernard Berenson and the art dealer Joseph Duveen. It is set over one evening in Berenson's Italian home, Villa I Tatti, near Florence, in 1937.

== Characters ==
- BB (Bernard Berenson)
- Mary, Berenson's wife
- Nicky Mariano, Berenson's secretary
- Fowles, Duveen's assistant
- Joseph Duveen

== Synopsis ==
The play opens on the garden of Villa I Tatti near Florence. The famous art critic Bernard Berenson, referred to as ‘BB’, is fearful of the rising power of Mussolini, who he refers to as ‘the Duck’, and increasingly anxious about the state of his finances. His wife, Mary, is in poor health while he continues having an affair with his secretary, Nicky. Duveen's assistant Fowles arrives to deliver a copy of a painting, and to tell Berenson that Duveen would like him to reconsider his attribution of a painting, The Adoration of the Shepherds. Berenson has already declared it to be by Titian, but Duveen would like him to change his mind and attribute it to Giorgione, and so increase its value considerably. Duveen is keen to sell the painting to the art collector, Mellon. Other art critics have already decided it is a Giorgione, but Berenson, whose reputation is pre-eminent, refuses to change his mind. Fowles leaves. Later that evening Duveen arrives, unannounced, to convince Berenson to change his mind in person. From there the intense and turbulent nature of their long working relationship unfolds.

== Original Production ==
The Old Master was first performed at the Birmingham Repertory Theatre in England on 4 June 2004, before moving to the Comedy Theatre, London, from 1 July 2004. It was directed by Harold Pinter with the following cast:

- BB – Edward Fox
- Mary – Barbara Jefford
- Nicky – Sally Dexter
- Fowles – Steven Pacey
- Duveen – Peter Bowles

Critical reception

The Daily Telegraph wrote "In the final analysis, the piece is less illuminating about art, less touching in its account of human love, than one might have hoped"; The Guardian concluded "the play belongs to its two male leads and when they are on stage you forgive Gray's elegant meanderings"; Variety wrote "the old masters involved in “The Old Masters” — from Gray to director Harold Pinter, the two marking their ninth collaboration, and on to co-star Edward Fox — aren’t in sustainedly peak form"; whereas The Independent called it "shrewd, beautifully articulated drama... The Old Masters is authentically vintage Gray."

== U.S. production ==
In June 2010 a US production of the play was announced, starring Brian Murray and Sam Waterston. It was due to run at the Long Wharf Theatre from 19 January to 13 February 2011, before moving to New York.
