= Cell Mates (play) =

Play written by Simon Gray

- Poster original West End production
- Original language: English
- Written by: Simon Gray
- Genre: Drama

Premiere
- Date: 16 February 1995
- Place: Albery Theatre, London
- Official website

Cell Mates is a play by Simon Gray. It opened at the Albery Theatre, London on 16 February 1995, starring Stephen Fry and Rik Mayall, with Gray himself directing. Despite having performed successfully for several weeks during the pre-London warm-up dates in Guildford and Watford then at the Richmond Theatre, Fry left the West End production after three days. His understudy, Mark Anderson, stepped in, until Fry was replaced by Simon Ward. Nevertheless, the production closed on 25 March 1995.

Later in 1995, Gray released an autobiographical account of the production, called Fat Chance. It was published by Faber and Faber.

The play was revived at the Hampstead Theatre in December 2017, in a new production directed by Edward Hall and starring Geoffrey Streatfeild as George Blake.

== Plot ==
The play concerns George Blake, who has been convicted for spying for the Russians and sentenced to forty-two years' imprisonment, and a fellow prisoner, Sean Bourke. Bourke helps Blake escape to Moscow, after which Blake does not want to let Bourke leave Moscow to return to his native Ireland.

== Controversy ==
In 1995, Stephen Fry famously walked out of the play near the start of its West End run, after his performance received a bad review in the Financial Times. It was reported at the time that he suffered an attack of stage fright, but he has since disclosed that it was bipolar disorder. Fry walked out of the production for good, leaving only an apology, and provoking its early closure.

Simon Gray described Fry's action as "cowardly", and in a statement to the press said: "It is disgraceful that so much media attention has been devoted to this squalid little story ... I confess my own failure as a director was to have cast Stephen Fry in the first place, and in the second place, not to have acknowledged my error by requesting his departure after his (self-proclaimed) inadequacies were abundantly clear to me." In response to the suggestion his reaction was insensitive to Fry's predicament, Gray added: "I'm a friend of Stephen's. I have great sympathy because he was hurt and stressed, but what he left behind him was the most awful chaos and distress for other people who loved him, including me."

Fry went missing, travelling to Belgium, and contemplating suicide. His personal website says, "The experience still haunts him, but the depression has now faded to embarrassment and the anger to forgiveness."

The incident would be humorously referenced shortly after in Bottom Live: The Big Number Two Tour, in which Rik Mayall also starred; during a moment in the second act of the show where Mayall breaks character and jokingly mocks Oxford following a heckler shouting "have a wank", Adrian Edmondson, Mayall's co-star in the play and comedy partner, also breaks character to ask Mayall if he had finished, and states he was "beginning to understand why Stephen Fry fucked off", jokingly implying Mayall had a hand in Fry leaving. The joke received a loud laughter and applause from the audience watching, while Mayall's reaction was to bow down to Edmondson improvised joke.

Years after the incident both Mayall and Edmondson would once again reference it in their final Bottom live show Weapons Grade Y-Fronts; when Eddie suggests using dirty magazines and self pleasure to repower their time traveling toilet (called the TURDIS), Richie inadvertently gives Eddie a hand job when attempting to reach into his own pocket. Immediately afterwards when Richie attempts to blame one of the audience members Eddie tells Richie he was "beginning to understand why Stephen Fry left that play", jokingly implying, along with Richie's later comment about Eddie having "the odour of Stephen Fry" that unwanted advances from Richie had something to do with Fry leaving the play.
