= Pat Pottle =

British activist

Patrick Brian Pottle (8 August 1938 – 1 October 2000), a long-time anti-war campaigner, was a founding member of the Committee of 100, an anti-nuclear direct action group which broke away from the Campaign for Nuclear Disarmament (CND). He was one of five brothers. He was born in Maida Vale, north London; his mother was from an Irish Catholic family and his father was a Protestant trades union official.

== Biography ==
In 1962, at the height of the Cold War, Pottle was jailed for 18 months for conspiracy (as one of the Wethersfield Six) to organise the Committee of 100 demonstrations at the nuclear base USAF Wethersfield in Essex.

In Wormwood Scrubs prison, Pottle met the spy George Blake and his outrage at the "vicious" sentence imposed on the spy led him and two others, Michael Randle and Sean Bourke, help Blake to escape in October 1966.

After the escape, Blake stayed at "safe" houses around London. Randle and Pottle later wrote that they got Blake out of the area, first to Dover, hidden in a camper van, and then to a checkpoint in East Germany. From there, Blake was able to get to the Soviet Union.

The admission of their involvement in the escape came in 1989, after the publication of a book about Blake by Montgomery Hyde. Pottle and Randle subsequently published a book admitting their involvement, titled The Blake Escape. Pottle later made this comment: "We didn't want needlessly to invite prosecution, but there were stories naming others who weren't involved, accusing us of being communist agents, trying to discredit the anti-nuclear campaign".

Criminal charges were laid against the two in 1991. Pottle and Randle defended themselves in court, arguing that, while they in no way condoned Blake's espionage activities for either side, they were right to help him because the 42-year sentence he received was inhuman and hypocritical. The jury found them not guilty on all counts, despite being given a clear direction that they must convict - an act known as jury nullification in which a jury uses its absolute discretion to find as it sees fit. Bourke was never charged since he lived in the Republic of Ireland and his homeland refused to extradite him to England to face charges.

A few months after Blake had escaped, Pottle met and married Susan Abrahams, the daughter of the Olympic champion Harold Abrahams and his wife, Sybil Evers.

For most of his working life, Pottle was a printer, running his own Stanhope Press in the 1960s, working as printer for the Peace Pledge Union in the early 1990s, and running his own Pottle Press in the late 1990s.

Pottle died in 2000, and was survived by his wife and two sons. His obituary in The Guardian provided additional insights into his anti-war activism: the co-founding in 1967 of the "Vietnam Information Group to help US deserters and draft dodgers reach Sweden" as well as his involvement in demonstrations against the "Greek colonels' coup" and "against the Soviet invasion of Czechoslovakia". His printing business was primarily involved in producing "leaflets for the peace movement and non-government organisations".
