= Experience Hendrix LLC v PPX Enterprises Inc =

English contract law case

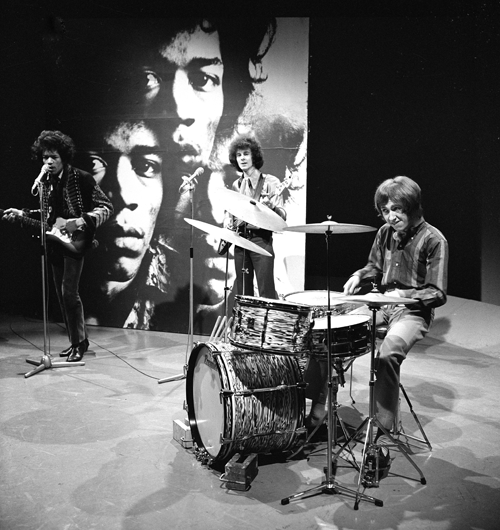
- Court: Court of Appeal
- Citation: [2003] EWCA Civ 323

Keywords
- Contract, remedies, restitution

Experience Hendrix LLC v PPX Enterprises Inc [2003] EWCA Civ 323 is an English contract law case, concerning the availability of restitution damages for breach of contract.

== Facts ==
Experience Hendrix LLC was the successor in title to Jimi Hendrix's estate. PPX Enterprises were his music publishers and were suing him before he died. Three years after, they settled (1973). The agreement was that PPX were entitled to masters of some of his recordings, in Sch A of the agreement, provided PPX paid royalties to Experience Hendrix. In breach of the agreement, PPX granted licences to masters not in Sch A. Experience Hendrix sued for the breach.

== Judgment ==
Court of Appeal said it would be unjust if PPX could breach the settlement and avoid paying royalties, which they would have had to pay if the songs were on Sch A. But the case was not exceptional enough to allow an account for all profits.

Mance LJ said they should pay ‘a reasonable sum’ for using the material. That was ‘such sum as might reasonably have been demanded’ by the estate ‘as a quid pro quo for agreeing to permit the two licences into which PPX entered in breach of the settlement agreement’. He said there was an element of artificiality, because permission for the licences may never have been given, but this directed ‘the court’s attention to the commercial value of the right infringed’ and the court could ‘assess the sum payable by reference to the fees that might in other contexts be demanded and paid between willing parties.’

== Outcome ==
The Hendrix vs Chalpin arguing looked as if it would are resolved in 1973 by method of an edict in the litigation of PPX Enterprises, Inc. v. Davis. Judicial proceedings were held within the judicature of Justice in London. In brief, the Hendrix Estate has acknowledged Enterprises' entitlement of thirty three percent of master recordings and also the preservation of rights to Increased royalty was ruled out in favor of the Estate. Enterprises abandoned all claims against the defendants and in agreement to surrender alternative master recordings then in its possession. Judgment was entered in favor of the defendants and against Enterprises within the quantity of fifty thousand pounds, and Chalpin in person warranted payment of that add.
