= Remak Ramsay =

American actor

Gustavus Remak Ramsay (born February 2, 1937) is an American stage, film and television actor. Ramsay was born in Baltimore, Maryland, the son of Caroline V. (née Remak) and John Breckinridge Ramsay.

== Stage plays ==
- Half a Sixpence (1965–66), as Young Walshingham
- Lovely Ladies (1970), as Captain McLean
- Sheep on the Runway (1970), as Edward Snelling
- On the Town (1971), as Ozzie
- Jumpers (1974), as Archie
- Private Lives (1975), as Victor Prynne
- Dirty Linen & New-Found-Land (1977), as Cocklebury-Smythe, M.P.
- Landscape of the Body (1978), as Durwood Peach
- The Dining Room (1981), as 1st Actor
- The Devil's Disciple (1988), as Anthony Anderson
- Nick & Nora (1991), as Max Bernheim
- Saint Joan (1993), as Chaplain de Stogumber
- The Heiress (1995), as Dr. Austin Sloper
- The Molière Comedies (1995), as Ariste/Gorgibus

== Selected filmography ==
- The Front (1976), as Hennessey
- Class (1983), as Kennedy
- Shadows and Fog (1988), as Senator Byington
- Mr. & Mrs. Bridge (1990), as Virgil Barron
- King of the Hill (1993), as Principal Stillwater
- Addicted to Love (1997), as Professor Wells
- Julie & Julia (2009), as John McWilliams

== TV appearances ==
- Truman (1995), as Dean Acheson (film)
- Law & Order (2000), as Ambassador Peter Sarno (Amends, episode #236)
- Law & Order: Criminal Intent (2002), as Doug Lafferty (Faith, episode #21)

== Awards ==
- Drama Desk Award Outstanding Actor in a Play

1981 nominee, for The Winslow Boy
1983 nominee, for Quartermaine's Terms
