= Butley (play) =

1971 play by English playwright Simon Gray

- Poster of original West End production
- Original language: English
- Written by: Simon Gray
- Genre: Drama
- Setting: An office in a London university

Premiere
- Date: 14 July 1971
- Place: Criterion Theatre, London
- Official website

Butley is a play by Simon Gray set in the office of an English lecturer at a university in London, England. The title character, a T. S. Eliot scholar, is an alcoholic who loses his wife and his close friend and colleague – and possibly male lover – on the same day. The action of the dark comedy takes place over several hours on the same day during which he bullies students, friends and colleagues while falling apart at the seams. The play won the 1971 Evening Standard Award for Best Play.

== Characters ==
- Ben Butley
- Joseph Keyston
- Miss Heasman
- Edna Shaft
- Anne Butley
- Reg Nuttall
- Mr Gardner

== Productions ==
Butley was first performed at the Criterion Theatre in London on 14 July 1971, produced by Michael Codron and directed by Harold Pinter, with the following cast:

- Ben Butley – Alan Bates
- Joseph Keyston – Richard O'Callaghan
- Miss Heasman – Brenda Cavendish
- Edna Shaft – Mary Wimbush
- Anne Butley – Colette O'Neil
- Reg Nuttall – Michael Byrne
- Mr Gardner – George Fenton

Alan Bates won the 1971 Evening Standard Award for Best Actor for his performance. The role of Butley was subsequently taken on by Alec McCowen and Richard Briers in the same production. Bates reprised his performance the following year in a Broadway production directed by James Hammerstein, set design Eileen Diss, lighting and set design Neil Peter Jampolis, at the Morosco Theatre, where it ran for 14 previews and 135 performances. The show cast Hayward Morse (Joseph Keyston), Geraldine Sherman (Miss Heasman), Barbara Lester (Edna Shaft), Holland Taylor (Anne Butley), Roger Newman (Reg Nuttall), and Christopher Hastings (Mr Gardner). Bates won the Tony Award for Best Actor in a Play and the Drama Desk Award for Outstanding Performance, and Gray was nominated for the Tony Award for Best Play.

A successful 2006 limited-run Broadway revival at the Booth Theatre was directed by Nicholas Martin. It starred Nathan Lane and Dana Ivey, who was nominated for the Tony for Best Featured Actress in a Play.

A 2011 London West End production of the play was produced for the Duchess Theatre, directed by Lindsay Posner with a cast including Dominic West, Paul McGann, Penny Downie, Amanda Drew, and Emma Hiddleston. The production started at the Brighton Festival from 25 May 2011 and in the West End from 1 June 2011.

In his introduction to the play, Harold Pinter wrote:

Simon Gray asked me to direct Butley in 1970. I found its savage, lacerating wit hard to beat and accepted the invitation... The extraordinary thing about Butley, it still seems to me, is that the play gives us a character who hurls himself towards the destruction while living, in the fever of his intellectual hell, with a vitality and brilliance known to few of us. He courts death by remaining ruthlessly – even dementedly – alive. It's a remarkable creation and Alan Bates as Butley gave the performance of a lifetime.

== 1974 film ==
A film adaptation of the play, directed by Pinter and starring Alan Bates, Jessica Tandy, Richard O'Callaghan, Susan Engel, and Michael Byrne, was released in 1974.

== Awards and nominations ==
=== Original Broadway production ===
Year	Award	Category	Nominee	Result
1973	Tony Award	Best Play		Nominated
1973	Tony Award	Best Actor in a Play	Alan Bates	Nominated
1973	Tony Award	Best Featured Actor in a Play	Hayward Morse	Nominated
1973	Drama Desk Award	Outstanding Performance	Alan Bates	Won

=== 2006 Broadway revival ===
Year	Award	Category	Nominee	Result
2007	Tony Award	Best Featured Actress in a Play	Dana Ivey	Nominated
