= Simon Gray =

English writer and academic

Simon Gray CBE FRSL
- Born: Simon James Holliday Gray; 21 October 1936; Hayling Island, Hampshire, England
- Died: 7 August 2008 (aged 71); London, England
- Education: Westminster School
- Alma mater: Dalhousie University (BA); Trinity College, Cambridge (BA)
- Occupations: Playwright, screenwriter, memoirist, novelist academic (1965–1985)
- Spouses: Beryl Kevern (m. 1965; div. 1997) Victoria Katherine Rothschild (m. 1997)
- Children: 2
- Writing career
- Period: 1963–2008
- Genres: Drama, screenplay, memoir, novel
- Notable works: Butley, Quartermaine's Terms, Otherwise Engaged, The Smoking Diaries
- Website: simongray.org.uk

Simon James Holliday Gray CBE FRSL (21 October 1936 – 7 August 2008) was an English playwright and memoirist who also had a career as a university lecturer in English literature at Queen Mary, University of London, for 20 years. While teaching at Queen Mary, Gray began his writing career as a novelist in 1963 and, during the next 45 years, in addition to five published novels, wrote 40 original stage plays, screenplays, and screen adaptations of his own and others' works for stage, film and television and became well known for the self-deprecating wit characteristic of several volumes of memoirs or diaries.

== Biography ==
Simon James Holliday Gray was born on 21 October 1936 on Hayling Island, in Hampshire, England to James Gray and his wife Barbara (née Holliday). His father, who later became a pathologist, worked on the island as GP. In 1939, during World War II, when he was three years old, Simon and his elder brother Nigel were evacuated to Montreal, Quebec, Canada, to live in "a house where his grandfather and [his grandfather's] alcoholic wife were attended upon by a younger aunt"; in 1945, when he was nearly 10, he returned to England, where he was educated at Westminster School, in London. In 1957, he received a B.A. from Dalhousie University, Halifax, Nova Scotia; and, in 1961, another B.A. from Trinity College, Cambridge. In 1965, he was appointed a lecturer in English at Queen Mary College, London.

He married his first wife, Beryl Kevern, in 1965; they had two children, a son and a daughter. They divorced in 1997. During their marriage, he had an eight-year affair with another Queen Mary lecturer, Victoria Katherine Rothschild (b. 1953), a daughter of Victor Rothschild, 3rd Baron Rothschild; in 1997, after his divorce, they married, living together in west London, until his death.

In 2004 he was appointed Commander of the Order of the British Empire for services to drama and literature.

Suffering from both lung cancer and prostate cancer and related ailments at the time of his death, he died of an abdominal aortic aneurysm, on 7 August 2008, at the age of 71.

== Career ==
When he was still in his 20s, he began his writing career as a novelist with Colmain, published by Faber and Faber in 1963. His career in drama began when he adapted one of his own short stories, The Caramel Crisis, for television. He subsequently wrote a number of plays for, amongst others, The Wednesday Play and Play for Today BBC anthology series, frequently in collaboration with the producer Kenith Trodd. Gray wrote 40 plays and screenplays for the stage, television, and film and eight volumes of memoirs based on his diaries.

Wise Child, an adaptation of a TV play deemed too shocking for the small screen, was his first stage play. It starred Simon Ward and Alec Guinness and was produced by Michael Codron at Wyndham's Theatre in 1967. Subsequently, he wrote original plays for both radio and television and adaptations, including a TV adaptation of The Rector’s Daughter, by F. M. Mayor, and stage adaptations of Tartuffe and The Idiot. His original television screenplays include Running Late, After Pilkington, Unnatural Pursuits, and A Month in the Country. His 1971 play Butley, produced by Codron, began a long creative partnership with Harold Pinter as director of both the play and the film versions and continued the partnership with the actor Alan Bates begun with Gray's 1967 television play Death of a Teddy Bear. In all Bates starred in 11 of Gray's works, while Pinter directed 10 separate productions of Gray's works for stage, film, and television, beginning with Butley. The last one was a stage production of The Old Masters, starring Peter Bowles and Edward Fox.

As with Butley (1971) and Otherwise Engaged (1975), whose London productions and films both starred Bates, and Quartermaine's Terms (1981), starring Fox, Gray "often returned to the subject of the lives and trials of educated intellectuals."

He wrote many other successful stage plays, including The Common Pursuit, The Late Middle Classes, Hidden Laughter, Japes, Close of Play, The Rear Column, and Little Nell, several of which he directed himself.

In 1984, at the suggestion of Robert McCrum, Faber editor-in-chief at that time, he kept a diary of the London premiere of The Common Pursuit, directed by Pinter at the Lyric Hammersmith, resulting in the first of his 8 volumes of theatre-related and personal memoirs, An Unnatural Pursuit (Faber 1985), and culminating in the critically acclaimed trilogy entitled The Smoking Diaries (Granta, 2004–2008).

Gray's play about George Blake, Cell Mates (1995), starring Rik Mayall, Stephen Fry and (replacing Fry) Simon Ward, attracted media attention when Stephen Fry suffered a nervous breakdown and abruptly "fled to Bruges" after the third West End performance, thus leaving the show without its lead actor. Gray subsequently wrote his theatrical memoir Fat Chance, providing an account of the episode.

In August 2008, shortly before his death, he attracted further press attention with his criticism of the Royal National Theatre's "cowardice" in dealing with the subject of radical Islam.

== Posthumous tributes and related developments ==
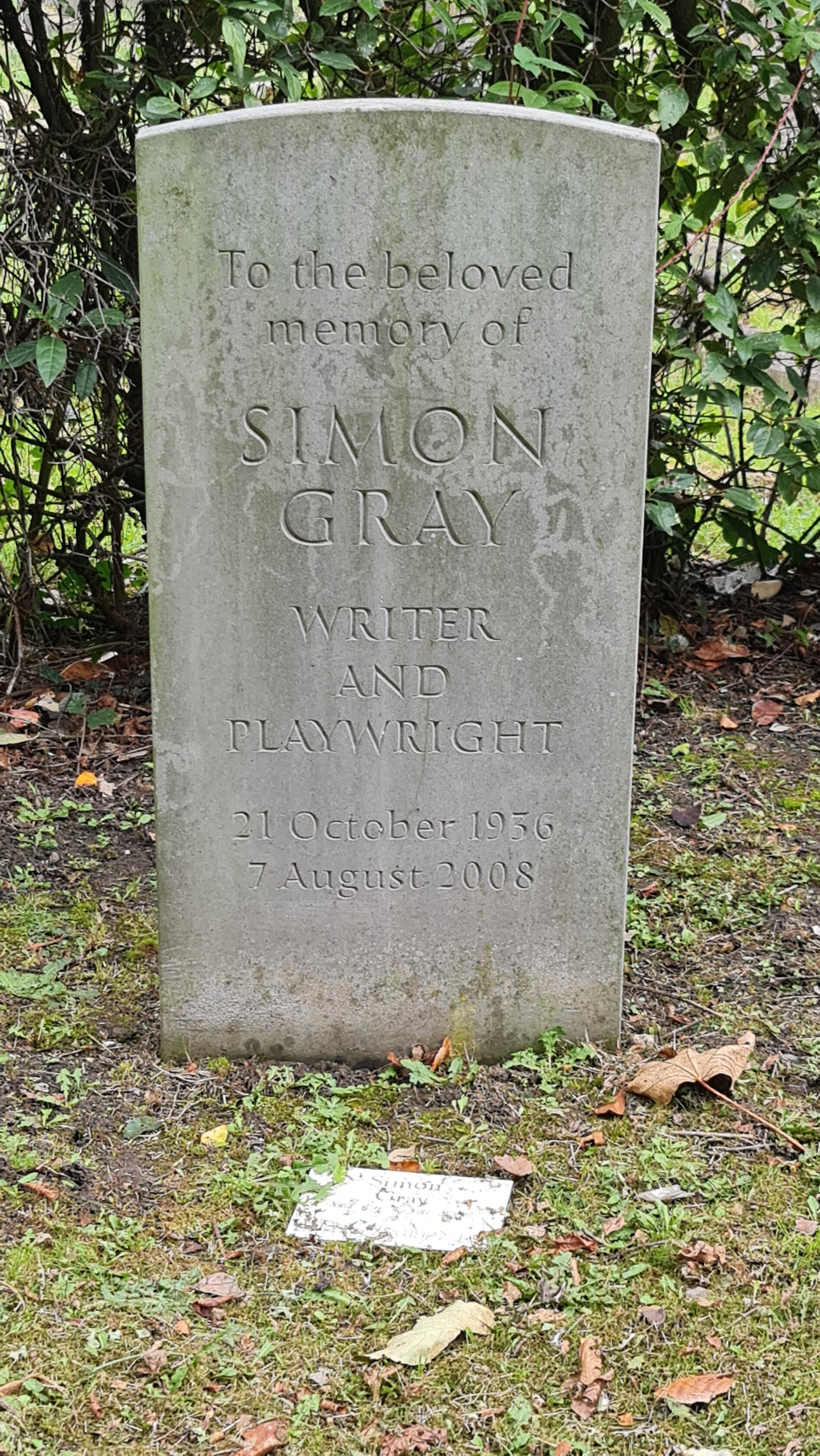
Gray's grave at Kensal Green Cemetery

Gray's final volume of diaries, Coda, "so named because it rounds off the trilogy of 'Smoking Diaries' (The Smoking Diaries, The Year of the Jouncer and The Last Cigarette) ... a meditation on death, or rather dying, an account of living on borrowed time," was published posthumously by Faber and Faber and Granta in November 2008. From 8 to 12 December 2008, in five 15-minute episodes, actor Toby Stephens read from this "candid and darkly comic account of coming to terms with terminal cancer" for BBC Radio 4's Book of the Week.

Simon Gray: A Celebration, directed by Harry Burton, who directed Gray's last stage production in Spring 2008 (Quartermaine's Terms at Theatre Royal, Windsor), was held at the Comedy Theatre, in London, on 15 March 2009.

A production entitled The Last Cigarette, based on Gray's and Hugh Whitemore's adaptation of the three volumes of his memoirs called The Smoking Diaries and directed by Richard Eyre, opened at the Minerva Theatre, Chichester, England, in April 2009. The production, with Felicity Kendal, Nicholas Le Prevost, and Jasper Britton, then transferred to the Trafalgar Studios, in London's West End,

An official web site was launched in October 2009.

The Late Middle Classes finally received its London premiere on 27 May 2010 at the Donmar Warehouse in London, directed by David Leveaux and starring Helen McCrory, Eleanor Bron, Peter Sullivan and Robert Glenister. The original production of the play, directed by Harold Pinter, was prevented from reaching its intended West End theatre by a musical about a boy band. Gray's experience of this production is the subject of his diary Enter a Fox.

In May–June 2014 In the Vale of Health, consisting of three unseen plays and one revival—Japes, Michael, Japes Too and Missing Dates—was performed at the Hampstead Theatre, London, directed by Tamara Harvey and starring Gethin Anthony, Jamie Ballard, Imogen Doel, Tom Mothersdale and Laura Rees. The plays tell the story, from different perspectives, of two brothers who fall in love with the same woman.

=== Give a Book ===
The charity Give a Book was established in Gray's memory in 2011. It is "dedicated to promoting books and the pleasure of reading in the hardest places", and works in prisons and with disadvantaged children and young people. It is supported by Penguin Random House, the Charlotte Aitken Trust, the Siobhan Dowd Trust, Inside Time magazine, the Royal Society of Literature and WoB Foundation.

Since 2021, Give a Book has awarded an annual Pleasure of Reading Prize for an author who "gives pleasure through their work". It was inspired by Antonia Fraser's book The Pleasure of Reading. The prize is supported by Bloomsbury Publishing and the Blavatnik Family Foundation, and the prize money of £10,000 is divided between the author and a Give a Book project of their choice.

==== Pleasure of Reading Prize winners ====
- 2021: Ali Smith
- 2022: Edna O'Brien
- 2023: Sebastian Barry
- 2024: Adam Nicolson
- 2025: Robert Harris

== Plays ==
- Wise Child, Wyndham's Theatre (1967)
- Dutch Uncle, Aldwych Theatre (1969)
- The Idiot (adapted from Dostoyevsky), Old Vic (1970)
- Spoiled, Haymarket Theatre (February 1971)
- Butley, Criterion Theatre (1971)
- Otherwise Engaged, Queen's Theatre (1975)
- Dog Days, Oxford 1976; Eyre Methuen (1976) ISBN 0-413-37270-7
- Molly, stage adaptation of his television play Death of a Teddy Bear (1967), based on the Francis Rattenbury 1935 murder case, Comedy Theatre (1978)
- The Rear Column, The Globe Theatre (1978); Eyre Methuen (1978) ISBN 0-413-39170-1
- Close of Play, National Theatre Lyttelton (1979)
- Stage Struck, Vaudeville Theatre (1979)
- Quartermaine's Terms, Queen's Theatre (1981)
- Tartuffe (adaptation), Kennedy Center, Washington, D.C. (1982)
- The Common Pursuit, Lyric Hammersmith (1984)
- Melon (later revised as The Holy Terror), Theatre Royal Haymarket (1987)
- Hidden Laughter, Vaudeville Theatre (1990)
- The Holy Terror, Temple of Arts Theater, Tucson, Arizona (1991)
- Cell Mates, Albery Theatre (1995)
- Simply Disconnected, sequel to Otherwise Engaged, Minerva Theatre, Chichester (1996)
- Life Support, Aldwych Theatre (1997)
- Just the Three of Us, Yvonne Arnaud Theatre (1997); Nick Hern Books (1999) ISBN 1-85459-434-6
- The Late Middle Classes, Watford Palace (1999)
- Japes, Peter Hall Company, Mercury Theatre, Colchester (2000) and Theatre Royal Haymarket (2001)
- Japes Too and Michael, published in Four Plays by Faber (2004) ISBN 0-571-21988-8
- The Pig Trade, published in Four Plays (2004)
- The Holy Terror (revival), Duke of York's Theatre (2004)
- The Old Masters featuring art critic Berenson and art dealer Duveen, Comedy Theatre (2004)
- Little Nell, BBC Radio 4 (2006); Theatre Royal, Bath (2007)
- Missing Dates, BBC Radio 4 (1 March 2008)

== Screenplays ==
- Butley (1974)
- A Month in the Country adapted from the novel by J. L. Carr (1987)

== Television plays ==
- The Caramel Crisis (BBC, Thirty Minute Theatre, 25 April 1966)
- Death of a Teddy Bear, based on the Francis Rattenbury 1935 murder case (BBC, The Wednesday Play, 15 February 1967)
- A Way with the Ladies (BBC, The Wednesday Play, 10 May 1967)
- Sleeping Dogs (BBC, The Wednesday Play, 11 October 1967)
- The Princess, adapted from a D. H. Lawrence short story (BBC, The Jazz Age, 1968)
- Spoiled (BBC, Wednesday Play 28 August 1968); Methuen Plays (1971) ISBN 0-416-18630-0
- Mother Love, adapted from W. Somerset Maugham (BBC, August 1969)
- Pig in a Poke (ITV, Saturday Night Theatre, March 1969)
- The Dirt on Lucy Lane (ITV, Saturday Night Theatre, April 1969)
- The Style of the Countess, adapted from the novel by Gavin Lambert (ITV, Playhouse, August 1970)
- Man in a Side-Car (BBC, Play for Today, May 1971)
- Plaintiffs and Defendants (BBC, October 1975)
- Two Sundays (BBC, October 1975)
- The Rear Column (BBC, 1980)

== Films for television ==
- Quartermaine's Terms (BBC, 1987)
- After Pilkington (BBC, January 1987)
- Old Flames (BBC, 1990)
- They Never Slept (BBC, March 1991)
- The Common Pursuit (BBC, March 1992)
- Running Late (BBC, October 1992)
- Unnatural Pursuits (semi-autobiographical, two-part satire, BBC, December 1992)
- Femme Fatale (BBC, February 1993)

== Novels ==
- Colmain, Faber (1963)
- Simple People, Faber (1965)
- A Comeback for Stark (writing as Hamish Reade), Putnam (1968), Faber (1969)
- Little Portia, Faber (1986) ISBN 978-0-571-14598-0
- Breaking Hearts, Faber (1997) ISBN 0-571-17238-5

== Memoirs ==
- An Unnatural Pursuit and Other Pieces, Faber (1985) ISBN 0-571-13719-9
- How's that for Telling 'em, Fat Lady?, Faber (1988) ISBN 0-571-15139-6
- Fat Chance, Faber (1995) ISBN 0-571-17792-1
- Enter A Fox, Faber (2001) ISBN 0-571-20940-8
- The Smoking Diaries, Granta Books (2004) ISBN 1-86207-688-X
- The Year of the Jouncer, Granta Books (2006) ISBN 1-86207-896-3
- The Last Cigarette: Smoking Diaries Volume 3, Granta Books (2008) ISBN 1-84708-038-3
- Coda, Granta Books (2008) ISBN 1-84708-094-4

== Collected plays ==
The Definitive Simon Gray. In 4 vols. London: Faber, 1992–1994.

Vol. 1: Butley and Other Plays (1992). ISBN 0-571-16223-1.
Vol. 2: Otherwise Engaged and Other Plays (1992). ISBN 0-571-16240-1.
Vol. 3 (1993). ISBN 0-571-16453-6.
Vol. 4 (1994). ISBN 0-571-16659-8.

Key Plays. Introd. Harold Pinter. London: Faber, 2002. ISBN 0-571-21634-X. (Includes: Butley; Otherwise Engaged; Close of Play; Quartermaine's Terms; and The Late Middle Classes.)

== Honours and awards ==
- 1967 Writer's Guild Award for Best Play, for Death of a Teddy Bear
- 1971 Evening Standard Award, for Butley
- 1975 Best Play, New York Drama Critics' Circle and Evening Standard Award, for Otherwise Engaged
- 1977 Drama Desk Award for Outstanding Play (foreign), for Otherwise Engaged
- 1982 Cheltenham Literary Prize, for Quartermaine's Terms
- 1987 Prix Italia, for After Pilkington
- 1993 Golden Gate Award for a Television Feature, San Francisco International Film Festival, for Running Late
- 1999 Barclays Theatre Award for Best New Play, for The Late Middle Classes
- 2004 Appointed Commander of the Order of the British Empire (CBE) for services to Drama and Literature in the 2005 New Year Honours
