= Simon Ward =

British stage and film actor (1941–2012)

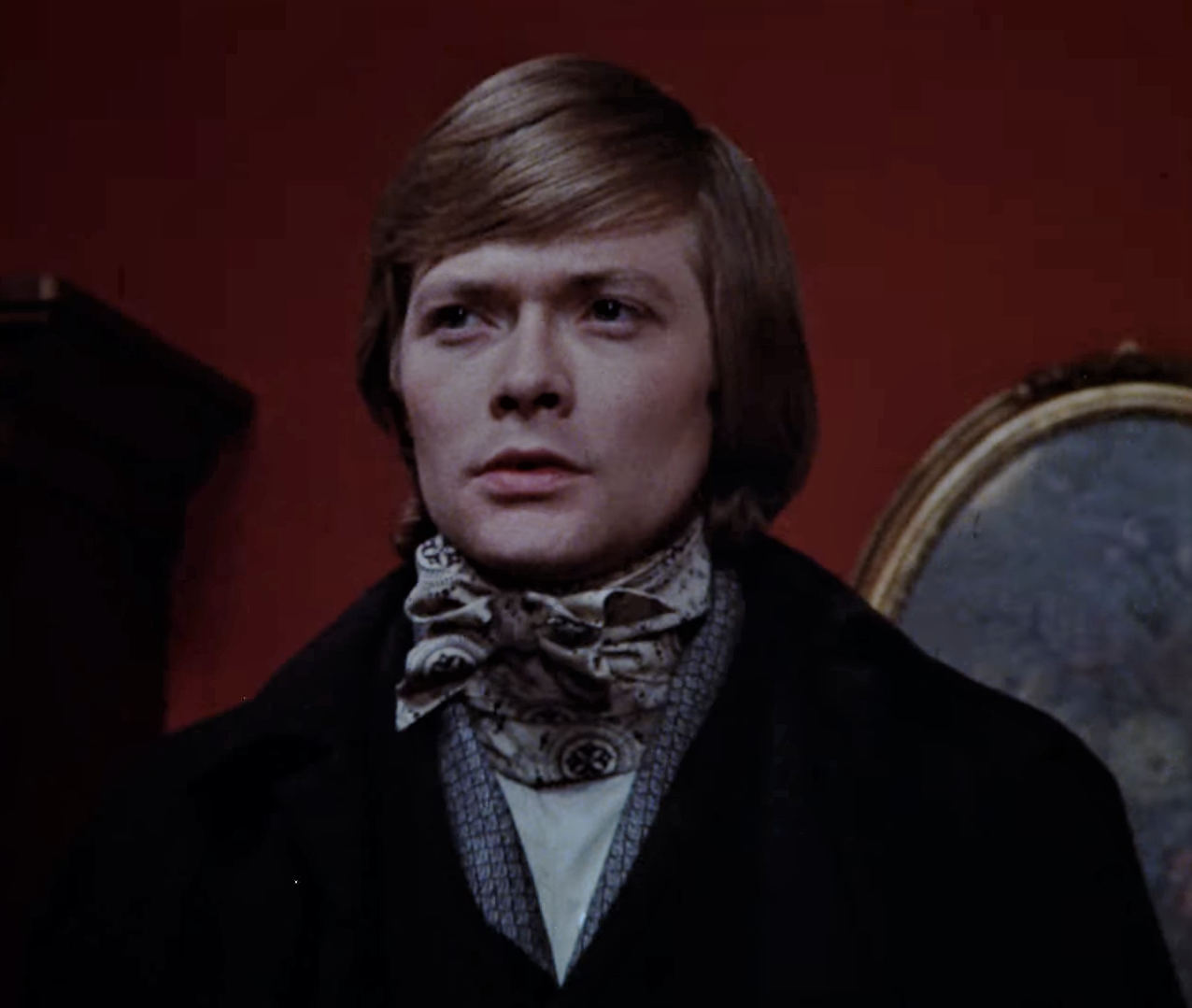
- Simon Ward as Arthur Holmwood in Bram Stoker's Dracula
- Born: Simon Anthony Fox Ward; 16 October 1941; Beckenham, England, United Kingdom
- Died: 20 July 2012 (aged 70); Taunton, England, United Kingdom
- Resting place: Highgate Cemetery, London, United Kingdom
- Occupation: Actor
- Years active: 1964–2010
- Spouse: Alexandra Malcolm (m. 1964)
- Children: 3, including Sophie and Kitty
- Relatives: Michael McIntyre (son-in-law)

Simon Anthony Fox Ward (16 October 1941 – 20 July 2012) was a British stage and film actor from Beckenham, England. He was known chiefly for his performance as Winston Churchill in the 1972 film Young Winston. He played many other screen roles, including those of Sir Monty Everard in Judge John Deed and Bishop Gardiner in The Tudors.

== Early life and education ==
Simon Ward was born on 16 October 1941 in Beckenham, the son of Leonard Fox Ward, a car dealer, and his wife Winifred. From an early age he wanted to be an actor. He received his formal education at Alleyn's School, London, where from the age of 14 he was one of the founding members of its drama group that became the National Youth Theatre, and stayed for eight years. He trained at the Royal Academy of Dramatic Art from 1961.

== Career ==
Ward made his professional stage debut with the Northampton Repertory in 1963, and his London theatrical debut one year later in The 4th of June. He worked in repertory in Northampton, Birmingham and Oxford and occasionally in London's West End.

His big break in theatre came in 1966 when he played Dennis in Joe Orton's Loot, which led to a number of small film and television roles. All of Ward's major film roles were in the 1970s.

His first film appearance was probably an uncredited role as one of the sociopathic students in Lindsay Anderson's If.... (1968). He was primarily a stage actor when selected to play the title role in Young Winston in 1971, the role which brought him to national prominence. The in-demand Ward starred in several high-profile films during the remainder of the 1970s.

In 1973 he played the Duke of Buckingham in Richard Lester's The Three Musketeers and in 1974 appeared in its sequel The Four Musketeers. Also in 1974 he played author-veterinarian James Herriot in the successful film adaptation of All Creatures Great and Small. He played one of the lead roles (Lt. Crawford) in the 1976 World War I film Aces High, then starred as Lt. William Vereker in the 1979 film Zulu Dawn. He was also seen as Captain Hoffmann, a fictional Nazi functionary, in Hitler: The Last Ten Days (1973). Later film roles included Zor-El in Supergirl (1984).

In 1986, Ward starred in the title role of Ross, the first West End revival of Terence Rattigan's play since its original run in 1960. It toured the UK and, after a run at the Royal Alexandra Theatre, Toronto, opened at The Old Vic, featuring Marc Sinden as Dickinson, with David Langton, Roland Curram, Bruce Montague and Ernest Clark in supporting roles.

Ward made few films after the 1970s, although he did have a major role in the Ralph Fiennes version of Wuthering Heights (1992), alongside his daughter Sophie Ward.

In 1987 he sustained a serious head injury in a street attack, the circumstances of which were obscure. He believed the attack, which left him with a broken skull that needed brain surgery, caused the chronic blood disorder, polycythaemia that affected his career.

In 1995, at very short notice, he took over Stephen Fry's role in the play Cell Mates, after Fry walked out of the play near the start of its run.

Between 2001 and 2007, he appeared as Sir Monty Everard in the BBC television series Judge John Deed; between 2007 and 2010 he starred as Bishop Stephen Gardiner in The Tudors.

In 2010, Ward appeared in the title role in the British tour of Alan Bennett's play The Madness of George III.

== Personal life ==
In 1964, Ward married Alexandra Malcolm, whom he met while they were students at RADA. They had three daughters, one being the actress Sophie Ward.

== Death ==
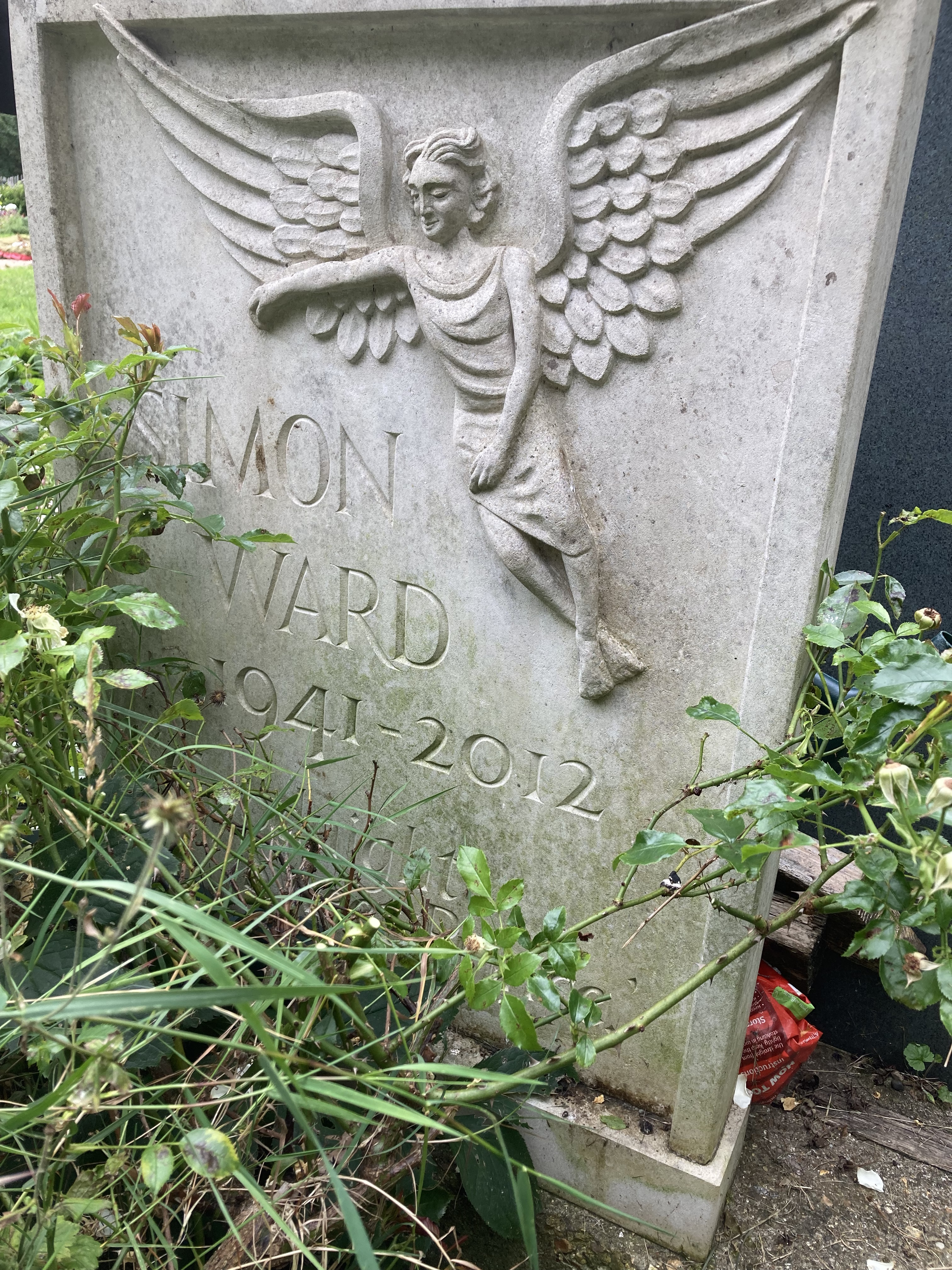
Grave of Simon Ward in Highgate Cemetery

Having been afflicted with ill health in his later years, Ward died aged 70, on 20 July 2012 in Taunton. His body was buried in Highgate Cemetery in London.

A memorial service was held in his memory at St Paul's Church, Covent Garden, London, on 9 July 2013.

== Filmography ==
=== Film ===
Year	Title	Role	Notes
1968	if....	Schoolboy	Uncredited
1969	I Start Counting	Conductor	
1969	Frankenstein Must Be Destroyed	Karl Holst	
1971	Quest for Love	Jeremy	
1972	Young Winston	Winston Churchill	
1973	Hitler: The Last Ten Days	Hauptmann Hoffmann	
1973	The Three Musketeers	Duke of Buckingham	
1974	Bram Stoker's Dracula	Arthur	TV film
1974	The Four Musketeers	Duke of Buckingham	
1975	All Creatures Great and Small	James Herriot	TV film
1975	Deadly Strangers	Stephen Slade	
1975	Children of Rage	Yaakov	
1975	Valley Forge	Major Andre	TV film
1976	Aces High	Lt. Crawford	
1977	The Standard	Herbert Menis	
1977	Holocaust 2000	Angel Caine	
1978	The Four Feathers	William Trench	TV film
1979	Dominique	Tony Calvert	
1979	Zulu Dawn	Lt. Vereker	
1979	The Last Giraffe	Jock Leslie-Melville	TV film
1979	La Sabina	Philip	
1980	The Rear Column	Ward	TV film
1981	The Monster Club	George	(segment "Shadmock Story")
1983	Manpower	Narrator	Short
1984	Supergirl	Zor-El	
1985	The Corsican Brothers	Chateau-Renaud	TV film
1985	Leave All Fair	John Jeune (Young John)	
1986	L'étincelle	Mike	
1992	Double X: The Name of the Game	Edward Ross	
1992	Emily Brontë's Wuthering Heights	Mr Linton	
1995	Nightshade	Peter Brady	
2000	Atrapa-la	Doug	TV film

=== Television ===
Year	Title	Role	Notes
1964	Festival	Stephen	1 episode
1964	Theatre 625	Dick Jervis	Episode: "Carried by Storm"
1965	Thursday Theatre	Tom Cherry	Episode: "The Flowering Cherry"
1965–1966	The World of Wooster	Eustace	2 episodes
1966	Thirteen Against Fate	Alain Malou	Episode: "The Son"
1966–1968	The Wednesday Play	Donald Clenham / John Hardie	2 episodes
1967–1968	Jackanory	Storyteller	6 episodes
1970	The Misfit	Ted Allenby-Johnson	2 episodes
1970	The Black Tulip	Cornelius Van Bearle	TV mini-series, 6 episodes
1970	Roads to Freedom	Philippe	3 episodes
1972	No Exit	Mark Gray	Episode: "A Man's Fair Share of Days"
1972	Cinema: A Documentary	Himself	
1973	ABC Afterschool Specials	Various roles	
1973	Orson Welles Great Mysteries	Stephen Barrow	Episode: "The Leather Funnel"
1975	BBC2 Playhouse	Saunders	Episode: "The Breakthrough"
1976	Call My Bluff	Himself	
1980	The Rear Column	Herbert Ward	TV film
1981	Diamonds	Bernard de Haan	13 episodes
1982	An Inspector Calls	Gerald Croft	TV mini-series, 3 episodes
1984	Allô Béatrice	Archibald	Episode: Agnes et ses papas
1984	Supergirl: The Making of the Movie	Himself	
1988	A Taste for Death	Stephen Lampart	5 episodes
1989	Around the World in 80 Days	Flannigan	TV mini-series, 3 episodes
1992	Lovejoy	Edward Brooksby	2 episodes
1994	Kurtulus	Winston Churchill	TV mini-series
1995	Ruth Rendell Mysteries	Will Harvey	2 episodes
1996	Challenge	Narrator	
1999	Real Women II	Samuelson	
2003–2007	Judge John Deed	Sir Monty Everard	20 episodes
2005	Family Affairs	Mr. Lee	3 episodes
2006	Heartbeat	Maxwell Hamilton	Episode: "Kith and Kin"
2009–2010	The Tudors	Bishop Gardiner	17 episodes, (final appearance)
