= London Suite =

London Suite may refer to:

- London Suite (play), the stage play by Neil Simon that premiered in 1994
  - London Suite (film), a 1996 television film based on the play
- London Suite (Coates), the 1933 orchestral suite by Eric Coates
