= Stuart Ostrow =

American theatrical producer and director

Stuart Ostrow (born February 8, 1932) is an American theatrical producer and director, professor, and author.

== Early life ==
Stuart Ostrow was born in 1932 in New York City to Abe and Anna Ostrow. He attended The High School of Music & Art, and received a degree in music education from New York University. He then served in the United States Air Force from 1952 to 1955, during which he directed and produced multiple camp shows for the troops. In 1957, he married singer Ann Elizabeth Gilbert; they have three children.

== Career ==
=== As producer-director ===
Born in Brooklyn, NY. Ostrow began his career as an apprentice of Frank Loesser and eventually became vice-president and General Manager of Frank Music Corporation and Frank Productions, Incorporated, the co-producers of the Broadway productions The Most Happy Fella, The Music Man, Greenwillow, and How to Succeed in Business Without Really Trying.

Ostrow's first solo project was as producer and director of Meredith Willson's Here's Love, the 1963 musical stage adaptation of the classic film Miracle on 34th Street. Subsequent producing credits include The Apple Tree, 1776, Pippin, M. Butterfly, and La Bête, which won the Laurence Olivier Award for Best Comedy.

In 1973, Ostrow established the Stuart Ostrow Foundation's Musical Theatre Lab, a non-profit, professional workshop for original musical theatre, the first of its kind. Since its inception, the MTLab has presented thirty-two experimental new works, including The Robber Bridegroom by Alfred Uhry and Robert Waldman, Really Rosie by Maurice Sendak and Carole King, and Up From Paradise by Arthur Miller and Stanley Silverman. He was also a founding member of the Opera-Musical Theatre Program of the National Endowment for the Arts.

=== As professor and board member ===
Ostrow presently is the Distinguished University Professor of Theatre at the University of Houston. He typically teaches up to three classes per school year, including a workshop class focused on the creation of new musicals. He has served on the Board of Governors of The League of New York Theatres, the Advisory Committee of The New York Public Library, the board of directors of the American National Theater and Academy, and the Pulitzer Prize Drama Jury.

=== As author ===
Ostrow is the author of A Producer’s Broadway Journey, Thank You Very Much (The Little Guide To Auditioning For The Musical Theatre), and Present At The Creation, Leaping In The Dark and Going Against The Grain: 1776, Pippin, M. Butterfly, La Bête & Other Broadway Adventures.

In 1978, Ostrow wrote and produced his own Broadway play, Stages, which closed on opening night.

=== As musician ===
Among his other achievements, Ostrow is a trained musician, choral conductor-arranger, and clarinetist.

== Broadway awards and nominations ==
- 1991 Drama Desk Award for Outstanding New Play (La Bête, nominee)
- 1988 Tony Award for Best Play (M. Butterfly, winner)
- 1988 Drama Desk Award for Outstanding New Play (M. Butterfly, winner)
- 1973 Tony Award for Best Musical (Pippin, nominee)
- 1969 Tony Award for Best Musical (1776, winner)
- 1967 Tony Award for Best Musical (The Apple Tree, nominee)
