= Driving Miss Daisy (2014 film) =

2014 filmed performance of the stage play

- Film poster
- Directed by: David Esbjornson
- Written by: Alfred Uhry
- Produced by: Richard Moore
- Starring: Angela Lansbury; James Earl Jones; Boyd Gaines
- Edited by: Jill Bilcock
- Production companies: Broadway Near You; Umbrella Entertainment
- Distributed by: Omniverse Vision; Screenvision; Fathom Events
- Release dates: May 25, 2014 (UK); June 4, 2014 (US)
- Running time: 90 minutes
- Countries: United States; Australia
- Language: English

Driving Miss Daisy is a filmed performance of the 2013 Australian theatrical production of the Pulitzer Prize-winning 1987 play of the same name by Alfred Uhry starring Angela Lansbury, James Earl Jones and Boyd Gaines. It was produced as a 2014 film by Broadway Near You (United States) in association with Umbrella Entertainment (Australia).

== Synopsis ==
Miss Daisy Werthan (Angela Lansbury) is a widowed, 72-year-old Jewish woman living in mid-century Atlanta who is deemed too old to drive by her son Boolie (Boyd Gaines). He then hires Hoke Coleburn, an African-American man (James Earl Jones) to serve as her chauffeur, and what begins as a troubled and hostile pairing soon blossoms into a profound, life-altering friendship that transcends all the societal boundaries placed between them.

== Cast ==
- Angela Lansbury – Daisy Werthan
- James Earl Jones – Hoke Coleburn
- Boyd Gaines – Boolie Werthan

== Production background ==
The Australian tour of the Broadway production of Driving Miss Daisy performed to sold-out audiences in Brisbane, Sydney, Melbourne, Adelaide, and Perth from February 9 to June 16, 2013. James Earl Jones and Boyd Gaines, who originally starred in the play's 2010 Broadway revival and subsequent 2011 West End transfer (opposite Vanessa Redgrave), both reprised their Broadway roles for the Australian tour.

This performance of the play was filmed with six cameras in high-definition video during its successful five-week run at Comedy Theatre in Melbourne, Australia from April 5 to May 12, 2013. A local crew was used for the six-camera shoot and Melbourne-based independent company Soundfirm completed all post-production – picture and sound.

The production of Driving Miss Daisy, directed for the stage by David Esbjornson and directed for the screen by Peter Ots, was filmed by New York's Broadway Near You in association with Australia's Umbrella Entertainment and produced by Jill Bilcock and Richard Moore. The play was produced for the Australian stage by John Frost by special arrangement with Jed Bernstein and Adam Zotovich. The creative team included John Lee Beatty (Scenic Design), Peter Kaczorowski (Lighting Design), Wendall K. Harrington (Projection Design), Christopher Cronin (Sound Design), and Mark Bennett (Composer).

== Theatrical release and TV broadcast ==
On May 25, 2014, a special screening of Driving Miss Daisy was broadcast live by via satellite from BFI Southbank in London to over 300 cinemas across the United Kingdom followed by an onstage Q&A session with Angela Lansbury, presented by Omniverse Vision and BFI.

On June 4, 2014, the film was released in a limited theatrical engagement in more than 500 movie theaters across the United States and Canada, presented by Screenvision and Broadway Near You.

On August 2, 2014, it was screened at Village Cinemas in Melbourne, Australia and featured the previously taped Q&A session with Angela Lansbury, followed by an Australian-wide limited release.

On May 14, 2015, Driving Miss Daisy was released as a one-night-only event in U.S. cinemas nationwide by Fathom Events and Broadway Near You, and was broadcast on PBS Great Performances on July 17, 2015, at 9 pm.

== Critical review ==
The Australian stage production was met with critical acclaim. In its 5-star review, The Herald Sun said, "It is a privilege to witness the consummate professionalism and fine acting of two of America's stage and screen royalty, Angela Lansbury and James Earl Jones". The Sydney Morning Herald critic raved, "I have never been happier jumping out of my chair and applauding wildly, while wiping away moisture from my cheeks". The Sydney Season praises: "With a cast whose reach transcends generations and whose successes are multitudinous, it is impossible to approach this play without the highest of expectations, and it does not, for a moment, disappoint".

== DVD release ==
On August 4, 2015, Driving Miss Daisy was released on DVD in Region 1 by PBS Distribution, available for purchase exclusively through the official PBS website at ShopPBS.org. It was later made available for purchase via Amazon.com as of September 29, 2015.
