= The Robber Bridegroom (musical) =

Broadway musical

- Original Broadway poster art by David Edward Byrd
- Music: Robert Waldman
- Lyrics: Alfred Uhry
- Book: Alfred Uhry
- Productions: 1975 Broadway; 1976 Broadway revival 2016 Off-Broadway

The Robber Bridegroom is a musical with a book and lyrics by Alfred Uhry and music by Robert Waldman. The story is based on the 1942 novella by Eudora Welty of the same name, with a Robin Hood-like hero; the adaptation placed it in a late 18th-century American setting. The musical ran on Broadway in 1975 and again in 1976.

== Production history ==
The show started with an early 1970s production at St Clements Theatre in producer Stuart Ostrow's Musical Theatre Lab, which invented the concept of the "workshop" development process for musicals. Raul Julia starred as Lockhart. Other cast members included Steve Vinovich (Clemment Musgrove), Rhonda Coullet (Rosamund), John Getz (Mike Fink), Bill Nunnery (Little Harp), Ernie Sabella (Little Harp), Trip Plymale (Goat), Cynthia Herman (Airie), and Susan Berger (Salome).

John Houseman bought the show for his group, The Acting Company and took it to the Saratoga Performing Arts Center in Saratoga Springs, New York with Kevin Kline replacing Julia, Patti LuPone as Rosamund, and Mary Lou Rosato as Salome. It then was staged at the Ravinia Festival in Chicago in the summer of 1975.

The first Broadway production, with the same Ravinia cast directed by Gerald Freedman and choreographed by Donald Saddler, opened in a limited engagement on October 7, 1975 at the Harkness Theatre, where it ran for 14 performances and 1 preview before setting out on a one-year US national tour. Its success on the road convinced the producers to mount a revamped Broadway production with an extended book and expanded, heavily bluegrass-tinged score. The music, deemed "country and southern" by Clive Barnes, was arranged for guitar, fiddle, mandolin, bass and banjo.

The second Broadway production opened on October 9, 1976 at the Biltmore Theatre, where it ran for 145 performances and 12 previews. The show was directed by Freedman, choreographed by Saddler, with scenery by Douglas W. Schmidt, costumes by Jeanne Button, and lighting by David F. Segal. The band, or the "McVoutie River Volunteers", consisted of Bob Jones (guitar, fiddle), Alan Kaufman (fiddle, mandolin), Steve Mandell (guitar, banjo), Roger Mason (acoustic and electric bass), Evan Stover (fiddle), and Tony Trischka (banjo, bandleader). The cast included Barry Bostwick (Lockhart), Steve Vinovich (Clemment Musgrove), Rhonda Coullet (Rosamund), Lawrence John Moss (Little Harp), Ernie Sabella (Big Harp), Trip Plymale (Goat), Susan Berger (Goat's Mother), Jana Schneider (Airie), Carolyn McCurry (Raven), and Barbara Lang (Salome). The residents of Rodney included George DeLoy (Kyle Nunnery), Gary Epp (Harmon Harper), B.J. Hardin (Norman Ogelsby), Mary Murray (Queenie Brenner), Melinda Tanner (Rose Otto), Dennis Warning (Gerry G. Summers), and Tom Westerman (K.K. Pone).

The 1977 National tour produced by Gordon Crowe starred Barbara Marineau (Rosamund), George DeLoy (Jamie), John Goodman (Little Harp), Ernie Sabella (Big Harp), Trip Playmale (Goat), Michael McGrath, Laurie Franks (Salome) and Scott Holmes and was directed by Bolen High and Porter VanZandt and choreographed by Dennis Grimaldi.

In 1980, the musical aired on Showtime as an installment in the Broadway on Showtime series. This production included several cast members from the touring production, including Goodman and Sabella.

An Off-Broadway revival was produced by Roundabout Theatre Company. Directed by Alex Timbers, the production starred Steven Pasquale as Jamie Lockhart. The production began previews at the Laura Pels Theatre on February 23, 2016 and officially opened on March 13 and closed on May 19, 2016. The production was nominated for four 2016 Lucille Lortel Awards, including Outstanding Revival. Leslie Kritzer (as Salome) was nominated for the 2016 Drama League Awards.

An original cast recording of the 1976 production was released by CBS. A recording of the 2016 Roundabout production was released by Ghostlight Records.

== Synopsis ==
=== Act One ===
In modern times, Jamie Lockhart and the other people involved tell of their ancestors, and the time dissolves to 18th-century Mississippi ("Once Upon The Natchez Trace").

Clemment Musgrove, the wealthiest planter on the Natchez Trace arrives in town only to have all of the townsfolk trying to steal his money. He finally makes it to a hotel, trying to escape the greedy townsfolk with a little rest. Little Harp, a largely unsuccessful robber, plots with his brother, Big Harp, who is only a head that he keeps in a briefcase, about how they can steal Musgrove's money, eventually devising a plan in which they kill him in his sleep ("Two Heads"). Robin Hood-like Jamie Lockhart, a legendary character in Mississippi folklore, rescues Musgrove from the Harp gang by tricking Little Harp into thinking that he killed them and their ghosts attack him. Grateful, Musgrove invites Jamie to his home for dinner and for the chance to meet and woo his greatest treasure, his daughter, Rosamund. Jamie reveals to the presumably curious audience why he did not steal Musgrove's money right there, claiming that he steals with more finesse than that of a lowly crook, covering his face with berry juice and calling himself The Bandit Of The Woods ("Steal With Style")

Meanwhile, we meet Musgrove's bitter second wife, Salome, who is making food for her husband's return from his two-week trip. She calls for Rosamund, the bane of her existence, to get herbs from out in the Indigo field. Rosamund, meanwhile, is in her own little world, dreaming of a man who will love her and call her name ("Rosamund's Dream"). Rosamund eventually goes out to get the herbs and Musgrove returns home, bringing gifts for his wife such as a feather duster and sewing needles, while he brings for Rosamund a dress sewn with gold. Rosamund returns home without the herbs but rather with a story of a panther causing her to lose all of them. Despite Salome's wishes that Musgrove stops babying Rosamund, he forgives her instantly and gives her the dress. In her bitterness, Salome sings of how everyone prefers the lily bud to ("The Pricklepear Bloom"). Salome goes out into town where everyone hates her and hires a boy named Goat to follow Rosamund back into the indigo field and kill her, taking a scrap of her new dress as proof.

Rosamund, donning her new dress, goes back to the woods to look for herbs, per Salome's request, and woes her empty, loveless life as Goat follows her ("Nothin' Up"). There, she meets The Bandit Of The Woods who requests that she completely undress and give him her dress. Rosemund does so willingly, asking if he wishes for anything else, but he leaves her there to return home naked. She does so and Musgrove is shocked but Salome is only upset that her plan was unsuccessful. Rosamund returns again to the woods later and follows The Bandit Of The Woods, intrigued by him ("Deeper In The Woods").

In preparations for Jamie Lockhart coming, Salome tells Rosamund to take care of the house, which she does willingly ("Company's Comin'"), hoping that she will look a mess by the end of it and Jamie won't be interested, leaving her to be with her Bandit Of The Woods. Finally, Jamie comes to the Musgrove estate and is greeted by Salome, dressed to the nines who immediately is entranced by his looks and pursues him sexually. Rosamund then tries to make herself out to be crazy to him and Musgrove tries to make the best of the situation and set up Jamie and Rosamund for marriage ("Riches"). Jamie agrees to think about it and give Musgrove his answer on Wednesday. Rosamund returns to the woods and goes to The Bandit's home—which Jamie encourages ("Little Piece Of Sugar Cane")--finds her dress, puts it on, and fixes the place up. Jamie sings of how girls giving themselves to him takes all the fun out of it and how he prefers to steal it ("Love Stolen"). He knocks her out and the two of them end up in bed together.

=== Act Two ===
Jamie and Rosamund wake up together and she wishes to him that he would show her his face and that they could know each other's names, but he refuses, telling her that this is what he wishes love to be. He tells her that he is to be engaged to an heiress and that that is business, while this is pleasure. Meanwhile, Salome speaks again to Goat, clarifying that he needs to follow Rosamund—who Musgrove believes to be kidnapped and missing by The Bandit Of The Woods—and kill her in order to get his payment. After that Goat runs in to Little Harp, who is aching for a woman and offers Goat many things, including Big Harp, in order to give Rosamund to him rather than Salome ("Poor Tied Up Darlin'").

Salome stumbles upon Jamie's cabin and finds Rosamund. Rosamund reveals to her that The Bandit will abandon her if she tries to see him without the berries and Salome advises her to do it, hoping that that will be the end of them. Rosamund leaves to do that, leaving Salome alone in the cabin. Little Harp comes to the cabin and reveals that Jamie and The Bandit are one and the same. He mistakes Salome for Rosamund and kills her ("Goodbye Salome"). Rosamund, now armed with a mixture to remove the berry juice, comes back and is assaulted by Little Harp. Jamie comes in and saves her, killing Little Harp. Unsettled by the murder Jamie rests at Rosamund's insistence, and she goes to remove the berry juice ("Sleepy Man"). She realizes who he is and wakes him up, excited that they can be both married and in love. Jamie, however, is furious and refuses, stalking out and telling her it's over. Rosamund grapples with her hate and love for him, eventually deciding to go find him. As she leaves, Jamie runs back, saying that he's changed his mind, but it's too late and they can't find each other ("Where, Oh Where Is My Baby Darlin'?").

Then Rosamund runs into Goat, who upon being asked, reveals that Jamie is a ghost who died 9 months ago. Rosamund says that's about right, revealing her very pregnant belly. However, she continues to look for him, being harassed by townsfolk all the while ("Pass Her Along"). She winds up going into labor and having twins, a boy and a girl. She soon finds Jamie and tells him that their kids are named Clementine and Jamie Jr. Jamie is surprised but happy and they get married. Just after, they find Rosamund's father, who hasn't seen her since she went missing and tells her of her stepmother's death and how happy he is for them. He gives Jamie a little money, though he is already wealthy, and no longer a crook. And everyone lives happily ever after ("Finale").

== Characters ==
- Jamie Lockhart/the Bandit of the Woods - A "gent and a robber all in one," Jamie Lockhart/the Bandit of the Woods is the show's main character. His true identity, Jamie, is an honest, law-abiding man who ends up engaged to Clement Musgrove's daughter Rosamund (though she is in disguise); while his alter-ego, the Bandit, is a swindling robber who comes across the undisguised Rosamund in the wood and becomes her lover.
- Rosamund Musgrove - Clement Musgrove's beautiful, naive, doted-upon daughter by his first wife. She meets the Bandit of the Woods and falls in love with him; she disguises herself and makes herself undesirably dim-witted when Jamie Lockhart comes to visit, unaware that he and the Bandit are the same person (and he is unaware Rosamund is the girl he met in the wood).
- Salome Musgrove - Clement's second wife. Older and ugly, she calls herself the "prickly pear" to the "lily bud" that was Rosamund's late mother, who was just as beautiful as Rosamund. However, she is quite a bit more intelligent than her husband and stepdaughter; detesting Rosamund, she puts her intelligence to use and spends the duration of the show thinking up schemes to kill Rosamund, enlisting the help of the "village idiot," Goat.
- Clement Musgrove - Rosamund's father, Clement is the richest planter on the Natchez Trace. Clement still harbours longings for his first wife (often he compares his daughter to his first wife, though it always accidentally is in a sexual manner), and this makes Salome, his second wife, incredibly jealous. Clement vows to marry Rosamund off to Jamie, who he doesn't realise is the Bandit of the Woods.
- Little Harp - The most gruesome bandit in the history of the Trace, Little Harp is a horny, dirty man. He is violent and seems to only fear the Bandit of the Woods. He spends the show looking for money to steal and women to rape - particularly helpless girls who are tied up - but through this, he becomes intricately involved in the show's mayhem. He is the brute half of the Harp brothers duo. However, he does prove to have some of his brother's intelligence, as he comes up with several ingenious schemes (though they all fail in the end and cause his death).
- Goat - The dumb boy with a brain the size of a scuppernong seed, Goat is enlisted by Salome to carry out her plans to kill Rosamund in exchange for a suckling pig, though Goat's many attempts to do as she asks go awry. In the end, he strikes a better deal with Little Harp. His sister is Airie.
- Big Harp - A "cut off head in a trunk," Big Harp was Little Harp's elder brother and the brain half of the duo. He was put to death for thieving, but his brother rescued his severed head and carries it around in a trunk. However, Little Harp makes a deal with Goat and exchanges his brother's head for "Rosamund" (who in reality is Airie, Goat's sister).
- Raven - The Harp brothers' talking raven. Accompanying the brothers initially in the show, Raven is stolen by Jamie and appears throughout the show advising the characters to "turn back, my bonny." Little Harp eventually kills Raven.
- Airie - Goat's sister. Just as dumb as her brother, Airie has no lines, but plays a pivotal part when Goat decides to trick Little Harp and put Airie in a sack and claim it's Rosamund. Airie escapes while Jamie/the Bandit knocks Little Harp out.
- Goat & Airie's mother - Only moderately more intelligent than her children, Goat's mother all but forces Goat to make a deal with Salome.

== Song list ==
Original production

- With Style
- The Real Mike Fink
- The Pricklepear Bloom
- Nothin' Up
- Deeper in the Woods
- Riches
- Love Stolen
- Poor Tied Up Darlin'
- Goodbye Salome
- Sleepy Man

Broadway production

=== Act One ===
- Once Upon the Natchez Trace - Jamie, Rosamund, Salome, Clement, Goat, Little Harp, Big Harp, & Company
- Suddenly the Day Looks Sunny - Jamie (recitation)
- Two Heads - Little Harp, Big Harp, & Company
- (Steal) With Style - Jamie & Company
- Rosamund's Dream - Rosamund & Jamie
- The Pricklepear Bloom - Salome & Company
- Nothin' Up - Rosamund & Company
- Deeper in the Woods - Company
- Riches - Clement, Jamie, Salome, & Rosamund (alt. title: "Marriage is Riches")
- Little Pieces of Sugar Cane - Jamie (recitation)
- Love Stolen - Jamie & Company

=== Act Two ===
- Poor Tied Up Darlin' - Little Harp & Goat
- Mean As a Snake - Raven (recitation)
- Goodbye Salome - Salome, Little Harp, & Company
- Sleepy Man - Rosamund & Men
- Where, Oh Where (Is My Baby Darlin'?) - Jamie, Clement, Rosamund, & Company
- Pass Her Along - Girls & Highway Robbers (recitation)
- Finale - Company

== Awards and nominations ==
=== Original Broadway production ===
| Year | Award Ceremony | Category | Nominee | Result |
|---|---|---|---|---|
| 1976 | Tony Award | Best Book of a Musical | Alfred Uhry | Nominated |
| 1976 | Tony Award | Best Performance by a Featured Actress in a Musical | Patti LuPone | Nominated |
| 1976 | Drama Desk Award | Outstanding Musical | | Nominated |
| 1976 | Drama Desk Award | Outstanding Book of a Musical | Alfred Uhry | Nominated |
| 1976 | Drama Desk Award | Outstanding Actress in a Musical | Patti LuPone | Nominated |
| 1976 | Drama Desk Award | Outstanding Featured Actress in a Musical | Mary Lou Rosato | Nominated |
| 1976 | Drama Desk Award | Outstanding Choreography | Donald Saddler | Nominated |
| 1976 | Drama Desk Award | Outstanding Director of a Musical | Gerald Freedman | Nominated |
| 1976 | Drama Desk Award | Unique Theatrical Experience | | Nominated |

=== 1976 Broadway revival ===
| Year | Award Ceremony | Category | Nominee | Result |
|---|---|---|---|---|
| 1977 | Tony Award | Best Performance by a Leading Actor in a Musical | Barry Bostwick | Won |
| 1977 | Drama Desk Award | Outstanding Musical | | Nominated |
| 1977 | Drama Desk Award | Outstanding Actor in a Musical | Barry Bostwick | Nominated |
| 1977 | Drama Desk Award | Outstanding Featured Actress in a Musical | Barbara Lang | Nominated |
| 1977 | Drama Desk Award | Outstanding Choreography | Donald Saddler | Nominated |
| 1977 | Drama Desk Award | Outstanding Director of a Musical | Gerald Freedman | Nominated |
| 1977 | Drama Desk Award | Outstanding Lyrics | Alfred Uhry | Nominated |
| 1977 | Drama Desk Award | Outstanding Music | Robert Waldman | Nominated |
| 1977 | Drama Desk Award | Outstanding Set Design | Douglas W. Schmidt | Nominated |

=== 2016 Off-Broadway Revival ===
| Year | Award Ceremony | Category | Nominee | Result |
|---|---|---|---|---|
| 2016 | Lucille Lortel Awards | Outstanding Lead Actor in a Musical | Steven Pasquale | Won |
| 2016 | Lucille Lortel Awards | Outstanding Featured Actor in a Musical | Greg Hildreth | Nominated |
| 2016 | Lucille Lortel Awards | Outstanding Featured Actress in a Musical | Leslie Kritzer | Won |
| 2016 | Lucille Lortel Awards | Outstanding Revival | | Won |
