= Barbara Lang =

Barbara Lang may refer to:

- Barbara Lang (film actress) (1928–1982), American film actress
- Barbara Lang (Broadway actress) (born 1937), American Broadway actress
