= The Importance of Being Earnest (2011 film) =

2011 film by Brian Bedford

- Directed by: Brian Bedford; David Stern
- Written by: Oscar Wilde
- Screenplay by: David Stern
- Based on: The Importance of Being Earnest; 1895 play by Oscar Wilde
- Produced by: Todd Haimes; Susan Loewenberg; Harold Wolpert
- Starring: Brian Bedford; Dana Ivey; Paxton Whitehead; David Furr; Santino Fontana; Sara Topham; Charlotte Parry; Tim MacDonald; Paul O'Brien
- Music by: Berthold Carrière
- Distributed by: BY Experience
- Release date: June 2, 2011
- Running time: 91 minutes
- Country: United States
- Language: English

The Importance of Being Earnest is a filmed version of the 2011 Broadway revival production of Oscar Wilde's 1895 play of the same name. The film is directed by Kurt Baker and stars Brian Bedford as Lady Bracknell.

== Cast ==
- Brian Bedford as Lady Bracknell
- Dana Ivey as Miss Prism
- Paxton Whitehead as Rev. Canon Chasuble
- David Furr as John Worthing
- Santino Fontana as Algernon Moncrieff
- Sara Topham as Gwendolen Fairfax
- Charlotte Parry as Cecily Cardew
- Paul O'Brien as Lane
- Tim MacDonald as Merriman

== Production ==
The 2011 Broadway revival of Earnest opened on January 13, 2011, at the Roundabout Theatre Company's American Airlines Theatre, following previews from December 17, 2010. After positive reviews and several extensions, the production is set to close on July 3, 2011, bumping Roundabout's other project, People in the Picture, to Studio 54.

On March 1, 2011, it was reported that the production would be filmed live on March 11 and 12, 2011, to be shown in cinemas in June 2011. Official dates were announced on April 11, 2011: the first theaters to run The Importance of Being Earnest: Live in HD would do so on June 2, 2011.
