= Here's Where I Belong =

- 1968 Playbill
- Music: Robert Waldman
- Lyrics: Alfred Uhry
- Book: Alex Gordon; Terrence McNally
- Basis: John Steinbeck's novel East of Eden
- Productions: 1968 Broadway

Here's Where I Belong is a musical with a book by Alex Gordon (a nom de plume of the novelist Gordon Cotler) and Terrence McNally, lyrics by Alfred Uhry, and music by Robert Waldman. The musical closed after one performance on Broadway.

== Background ==
Based on John Steinbeck's novel East of Eden, the allegorical tale centers on the Trasks and the Hamiltons, two families drawn to the rich farmlands of Salinas, California, in the early 20th century. While Steinbeck traced the two clans through three generations, the musical limits the action to the period between 1915 and 1917 and focuses primarily on the Cain and Abel aspects of the work.

== Production ==
McNally asked that his name be removed from the credits prior to opening night. The official opening on Broadway was postponed from February 20, 1968, to March 2, 1968, to allow time for rewrites to the book.

The musical premiered on Broadway at the Billy Rose Theatre on March 3, 1968, and closed after one performance and twenty previews. Directed by Michael Kahn and choreographed by Tony Mordente, the cast included Paul Rogers as Adam Trask, Walter McGinn as Caleb Trask, Ken Kercheval as Aron Trask, Scott Jarvis as Rabbit Holman, James Coco as Lee, Graciela Daniele as Faith, and Heather MacRae as Abra Bacon. The scenery was by Ming Cho Lee, costumes by Ruth Morley, and lighting by Jules Fisher.

The play was picketed by the newly formed Oriental Actors of America, a group of Asian American stage actors, as a protest against the practice of casting white actors in yellowface makeup to portray East Asian characters (usually Chinese or Japanese). The role of "Lee", the Trask family's Chinese cook, had been assigned to white actor (and future Academy Award nominee) James Coco. Variety would mention the picketing in its review of the failed musical and note, "On the basis of the show, they had a point."

== Reception ==
In his The New York Times review, Clive Barnes questioned whether the book (East of Eden) could be a viable musical as it was "too serious", but praised the sets by Ming Cho Lee and wrote that Paul Rogers had a "strong singing voice" and was dignified.

The circumstances of play's production were covered in the William Goldman book The Season: A Candid Look at Broadway. Goldman wrote the musical "needed the notices. They didn't get them. Some of the pans were cruel. I don't know why. The show wanted to move you, it never insulted, and it had several musical moments — "Good Boy," "Waking Up the Sun" — that were as fine as anything heard on Broadway all season." The production only lasted one night and lost $604,000 which Goldman called "the most expensive one night stand in Broadway history."

== Song list ==
Act I

- "We Are What We Are" - Cal, Adam, Lee, Aron
- "Cal Gets By" - Cal
- "Raising Cain" - Cal and Ensemble
- "Soft Is the Sparrow" - Aron
- "Where Have I Been" - Adam, Lee, Townspeople
- "No Time" - Cal, Aron
- "Progress" - Main ensemble
- "Good Boy" - Cal
- "Ballet" - Cal, Juana, Abra and dancing ensemble
- "Act Like a Lady" - Abra
- "The Send-Off" - townspeople
- "Top of the Train" - Adam, Cal
- "Waking Up Sun" - Abra, Cal

Act II

- "Pulverize the Kaiser" - Mrs Bacon, Mrs Tripp, Mrs Heink, townspeople
- "Where Have I Been (Reprise)" - Adam
- "Good Boy (Reprise)" - Cal
- "You're Momma's" - Kate
- "Here's Where I Belong" - Cal, Abra
- "We're a Home" - Adam, Lee, Aron, Abra, Cal

== Recordings ==
- "We're A Home" was recorded by The Ray Conniff Singers in 1967 and released as a single (Columbia 4-44422). The recording was reissued in stereo on a Ray Conniff compilation CD "The Singles Collection, Vol. 1" (Collectables 7697) in 2005.
- "Here is Where I Belong" was recorded by Al Caiola and released as a single in 1968 (United Artists 50252). It was also recorded by Ferrante & Teicher and released as a single in 1968 (United Artists 50259). Both were instrumental versions.
