= Easy Street (TV series) =

American television sitcom

- Genre: Sitcom
- Created by: Hugh Wilson; Andy Borowitz
- Starring: Loni Anderson; Jack Elam; Lee Weaver; Dana Ivey; James Cromwell; Arthur Malet
- Opening theme: "Easy Street" performed by Linda Jackson
- Composer: Parmer Fuller
- Country of origin: United States
- Original language: English
- No. of seasons: 1
- No. of episodes: 22

Production
- Executive producers: Hugh Wilson; Andy Borowitz
- Camera setup: Multi-camera
- Running time: 30 minutes
- Production company: Viacom Productions

Original release
- Network: NBC
- Release: September 13, 1986 – April 29, 1987

Easy Street is an American sitcom television series created by Hugh Wilson and Andy Borowitz, starring Loni Anderson that aired for 22 episodes on NBC from September 13, 1986 to April 29, 1987.

== Plot ==
The series stars Loni Anderson as L.K. McGuire, a onetime showgirl who manages to nab a young wealthy husband, Ned McGuire, only to have him die and leave her fending for herself against his embittered sister, who's out to get L.K. out of the picture and away from her inherited money. Meanwhile, L.K. reconnects with a down-on-his-luck uncle, Bully Stevenson (Jack Elam) who has been on and off the streets of Los Angeles. L.K. invites him and his pal, Ricardo Williams (Lee Weaver), to move into her vast mansion, to the horror and consternation of her snobbish in-laws, Eleanor and Quentin Standard (Dana Ivey and James Cromwell).

Quentin tends to be a bit more tolerant and friendly to L.K. and her family, but the snobbish Eleanor can't stand them, and does everything possible to get rid of them all. Arthur Malet co-stars as Bobby, the McGuire's butler.

== Cast ==
- Loni Anderson as L.K. McGuire
- Jack Elam as Uncle Alvin "Bully" Stevenson
- Lee Weaver as Ricardo Williams
- Dana Ivey as Eleanor Standard
- James Cromwell as Quentin Standard
- Arthur Malet as Bobby

== Episodes ==
No.	Title	Directed by	Written by	Original release date
1	"Pilot"	Hugh Wilson	Hugh Wilson	September 13, 1986
L.K. McGuire invites her Uncle Bully and his friend and roommate, Ricardo Williams, to come live with her at her deceased husband’s mansion. Also living at the mansion: her deceased husband’s sister and her husband, who aren’t happy with the new arrangement. While Quentin tries to make the best of the situation, snobby Eleanor wants them all out of her brother's mansion.
2	"Pride Goeth Before a Cheap Hotel"	Sam Weisman	Sheldon Bull	September 20, 1986
Bully decides to move back to the retirement home because he feels he’s taking advantage of L.K. if he stays with her.
3	"Two-Party System"	Sam Weisman	Sheldon Bull	September 28, 1986
Eleanor doesn’t invite Bully and Ricardo to her elegant anniversary party.
4	"Comes a Horse"	Tony Singletary	Andy Borowitz	October 5, 1986
When Eleanor doesn’t let Bully and Ricardo ride her horse, they go out and buy their own.
5	"Man Overboard"	Alan Bergmann	Barbara Hall	October 12, 1986
L.K. couldn’t be happier, but Eleanor is horrified when one of her friends has a crush on Bully.
6	"Spoonlighting"	Hugh Wilson	Bruce Rasmussen	October 26, 1986
Eleanor makes Bully feel like he has to buy L.K. an expensive gift for her birthday.
7	"Are We Not Men?"	Hugh Wilson	Barbara Hall	November 2, 1986
A bad book review depresses Quentin, and snobbish Eleanor feels it’s a waste of time to try to cheer him up.
8	"Be-Bop Man"	Peter Baldwin	Richard Dubin	November 9, 1986
Ricardo gets a royalty check for a song he wrote.
9	"Charity Begins at Home"	Tony Mordente	Andy Borowitz, Sheldon Bull & Barbara Hall	November 16, 1986
When the orchestra cancels out on Eleanor’s fundraising event, L.K. decides to change things around to make the event a little more entertaining.
10	"Like That Brave Little Gal in the Philippines"	Tony Mordente	Sheldon Bull	November 23, 1986
Panic runs through the house when it’s learned that one of Ned McGuire’s companies is losing a million dollars a month.
11	"My Dinner With L.K."	Tony Singletary	Andy Borowitz	November 30, 1986
Bully and Ricardo set L.K. up on a date.
12	"Demon Child '86"	Tony Mordente	Andy Borowitz & Barbara Hall	December 7, 1986
Eleanor gets tricked into babysitting her friend’s spoiled teenager for the weekend.
13	"Friends for Life"	Tony Mordente	Miriam Trogdon	December 14, 1986
L.K. isn’t happy to learn that Eleanor invited a dictator to stay at the house.
14	"Frames and Dames"	Tony Mordente	Sheldon Bull & Andy Borowitz	January 11, 1987
While Quentin comes up with a get rich quick idea, L.K. fills in on Bully and Ricardo’s bowling team.
15	"The Check Is in the Mail"	Tony Mordente	Andy Borowitz	January 18, 1987
While Eleanor’s busy hiring a press agent, Bully wants to give money to a down-on-his-luck boxer he read about in the newspaper.
16	"The Mad Gardener"	Hugh Wilson	Hugh Wilson	January 31, 1987
Eleanor, Quentin, and L.K. are scared of the gardener and none of them has the courage to fire him.
17	"Will Power"	Bill Foster	Andy Borowitz	February 8, 1987
A furious Eleanor finally decides to contest her brother's will and wants to leave L.K. with nothing.
18	"Too Many Cooks"	Tony Mordente	Richard Dubin	February 15, 1987
Bully and the new chef (Dom DeLuise) compete to see who can make the best chili.
19	"Our Kind of People"	Tony Mordente	David Chambers	February 22, 1987
Eleanor and Quentin sell the house next door to someone they think will be the perfect neighbor.
20	"The Country Club"	Hugh Wilson	Max Tash	March 1, 1987
L.K. sends Bully and Ricardo to the country club to exercise. As it turns out, that’s the only thing they don’t do there.
21	"Maid in Italy"	Tony Mordente	Bruce Rasmussen	March 31, 1987
The new maid becomes homesick and is unable to function.
22	"Spring Fever"	Tony Mordente	Russ Woody	April 29, 1987
Spring arrives and love is in the air in the McGuire mansion.
