= Dana Ivey =

American actress (born 1941)

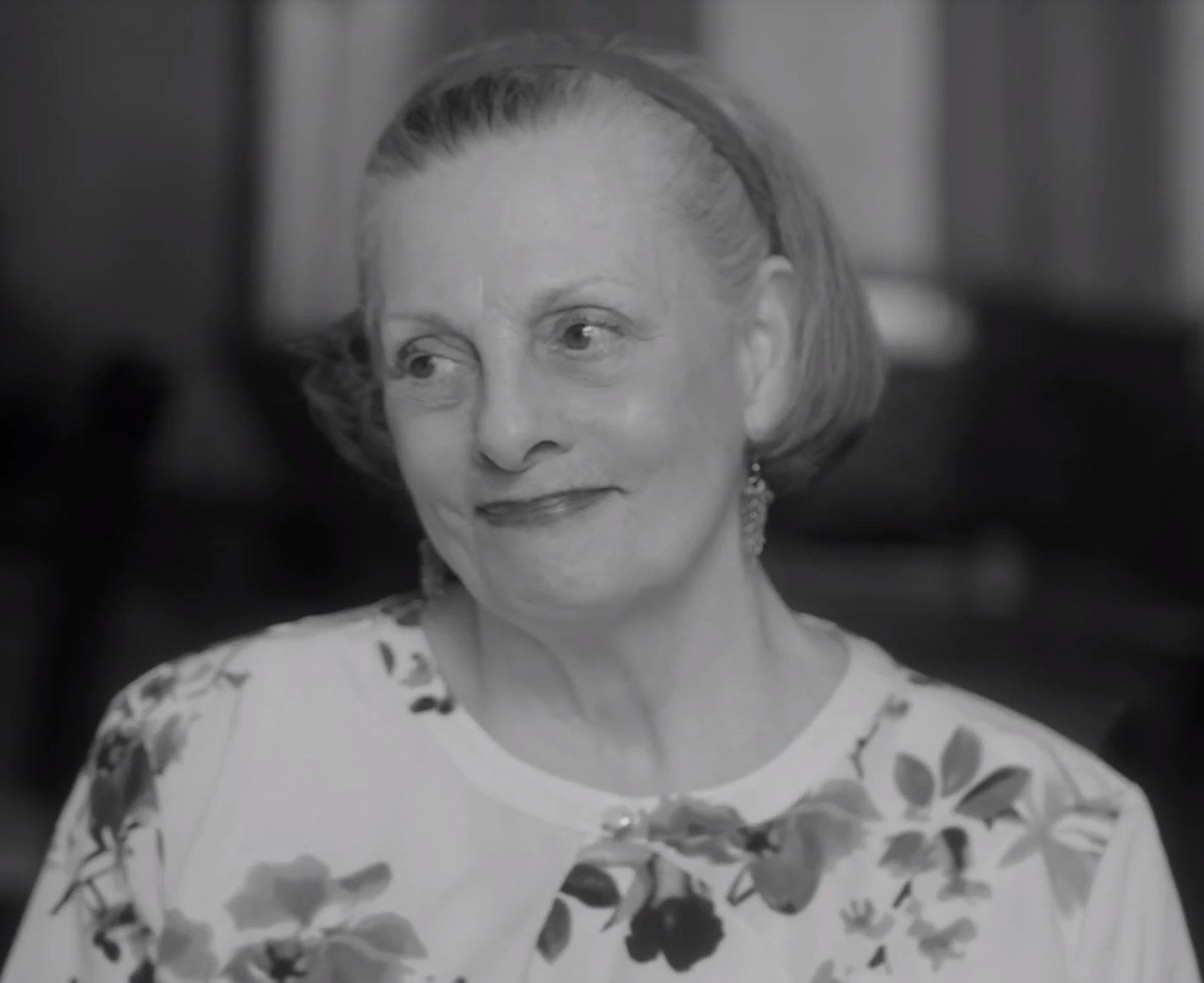
- Ivey in Professional Cuddler, 2018
- Born: August 12, 1941 (age 85); Atlanta, Georgia, U.S.
- Education: London Academy of Music and Dramatic Art
- Occupation: Actress
- Years active: 1962–2019
- Mother: Mary Nell Santacroce
- Website: danaivey.com

Dana Ivey (born August 12, 1941) is an American retired actress. She is known for her work on Broadway, earning the 1997 Drama Desk Award for Outstanding Featured Actress in a Play for her work in both Sex and Longing and The Last Night of Ballyhoo. She originated the title role in Driving Miss Daisy and was nominated for a Drama Desk award for Best Actress in a Play. She received five Tony Award nominations for her roles in Sunday in the Park with George (1984), Heartbreak House (1984), The Last Night of Ballyhoo (1997), The Rivals (2005), and Butley (2007).

On film, she has acted in The Color Purple (1985), Dirty Rotten Scoundrels (1988), The Addams Family (1991), Home Alone 2: Lost in New York (1992), Sleepless in Seattle (1993), Addams Family Values (1993), Two Weeks Notice (2002), Legally Blonde 2: Red, White & Blonde (2003), Rush Hour 3 (2007), and The Help (2011). On television, she has appeared on Frasier, Sex and the City, Boardwalk Empire and The Big C.

== Early life and family ==
Ivey was born in Atlanta, Georgia. Her mother, Mary Nell Ivey Santacroce (née McKoin), was a teacher, speech therapist, and actress who appeared in productions of Driving Miss Daisy and taught at Georgia State University; Mary Nell was considered by John Huston to be "one of the three or four greatest actresses in the world." Her parents divorced. She has a younger brother, John, and a half-brother, Eric Santacroce, and one nephew, Evan Santacroce from her mother's remarriage to Dante Santacroce.

Dana Ivey earned her undergraduate degree at Rollins College in Winter Park, Florida. She was a member of Phi Mu women's fraternity, and earned a Fulbright grant to study drama at the London Academy of Music and Dramatic Art. Ivey received an honorary doctorate (humane letters) from Rollins College in February 2008. She is an Episcopalian and is on the Advisory Board for the Episcopal Actors Guild.

== Career ==
=== 1974–1989: Early Broadway work ===
Before making New York City her home in the late 1970s, Ivey appeared in numerous American and Canadian stage productions and served as director of DramaTech in Atlanta from 1974 to 1977, as had her mother before her from 1949 to 1966. In 1981, Ivey made her Broadway debut playing two small roles in a production of Macbeth; the following year, she was cast in a major supporting role in a revival of Noël Coward's Present Laughter, for which she received the Clarence Derwent Award as Outstanding Featured Actress in a Play. She was nominated for two Tony Awards in the same season (1984) – as Best Featured Actress in a Musical for Stephen Sondheim's Sunday in the Park with George and Best Featured Actress in a Play for a revival of Heartbreak House – a feat repeated by only three other actresses, Amanda Plummer, Jan Maxwell, and Kate Burton. Ivey's performances in Quartermaine's Terms and Driving Miss Daisy (creating the title role) earned her Obie Awards, as did that in Mrs. Warren's Profession (2005). Ivey's first film appearance was in Joe Dante's 1985 science-fiction fantasy film Explorers with Ethan Hawke and River Phoenix. In 1978, Ivey made her television debut in the daytime soap opera Search for Tomorrow. Her television credits include a starring role in the sitcom Easy Street opposite Loni Anderson and guest appearances on Homicide: Life on the Street and Law & Order. Her first major screen appearance was in Steven Spielberg's adaptation of Alice Walker's The Color Purple later that same year. She took a bit part in Dirty Rotten Scoundrels (1988).

=== 1990–2009: Character actor roles ===
Among her other film credits include the 1995 remake of Sabrina, Simon Birch, Postcards from the Edge, Home Alone 2: Lost in New York, The Addams Family, Sleepless in Seattle, Addams Family Values, Legally Blonde 2: Red, White and Blonde, The Adventures of Huck Finn, Orange County, Rush Hour 3, The Leisure Seeker, The Importance of Being Earnest, and as Sandra Bullock's character's mother, Mrs. Kelson, in Two Weeks Notice.

Ivey performed in the New York premiere in 2009 of The Savannah Disputation by Evan Smith at Playwrights Horizons. The comedy co-starred Marylouise Burke, Reed Birney, and Kellie Overbey.

=== 2010–present: Later work ===
In July 2010, she appeared as Winnie in Happy Days by Samuel Beckett at the Westport Playhouse. She appeared as Miss Prism in the Roundabout Theatre Company Broadway production of The Importance of Being Earnest in 2011. Ivey played Mrs Candour in the 2016 production of The School for Scandal at the Lucille Lortel Theatre.

In 2011, she played the role of Grace Higginbotham in the critically acclaimed film, The Help, and starred in Muhammad Ali's Greatest Fight. During this time she acted in Frasier, Oz, The Practice, Sex and the City, Ugly Betty, Boardwalk Empire, and Monk (episode "Mr. Monk and the Other Detective"). In December 2016, Ivey was invited by the Noël Coward Society to lay flowers on the statue of Sir Noël Coward at the Gershwin Theatre in Manhattan to celebrate the 117th birthday of "The Master".

== Acting credits ==
=== Film ===
| Year | Title | Role | Notes |
|---|---|---|---|
| 1985 | Explorers | Mrs. Müller | |
| 1985 | The Color Purple | Miss Millie | |
| 1986 | Heartburn | Wedding Speaker | |
| 1988 | The Appointments of Dennis Jennings | Newscaster | Short film |
| 1988 | Another Woman | Engagement Party Guest | |
| 1988 | Dirty Rotten Scoundrels | Mrs. Reed | |
| 1990 | Postcards from the Edge | Wardrobe Mistress | |
| 1991 | The Addams Family | Margaret Alford | |
| 1992 | Home Alone 2: Lost in New York | Hester Stone | |
| 1993 | The Adventures of Huck Finn | Widow Douglas | |
| 1993 | Guilty as Sin | Judge D. Tompkins | |
| 1993 | Sleepless in Seattle | Claire | |
| 1993 | Addams Family Values | Margaret Addams | |
| 1995 | The Scarlet Letter | Meredith Stonehall | |
| 1995 | Sabrina | Mack | |
| 1998 | The Impostors | Mrs. Essendine | |
| 1998 | Simon Birch | Grandmother Wenteworth | |
| 1999 | Mumford | Mrs. Crisp | |
| 1999 | Walking Across Egypt | Beatrice Vernon | |
| 2000 | The Kid | Dr. Alexander | |
| 2002 | Orange County | Vera Gantner | |
| 2002 | Two Weeks Notice | Ruth Kelson | |
| 2003 | Legally Blonde 2: Red, White & Blonde | Libby Hauser | |
| 2006 | A Very Serious Person | Betty | |
| 2007 | Broken English | Elinor Gregory | |
| 2007 | Rush Hour 3 | Sister Agnes | |
| 2008 | Ghost Town | Marjorie Pickthall | |
| 2008 | Claire | Barbara | Short film |
| 2009 | Did You Hear About the Morgans? | Trish Pinger | |
| 2011 | The Help | Gracie Higginbotham | |
| 2013 | Muhammad Ali's Greatest Fight | Mrs. Paige | |
| 2014 | We'll Never Have Paris | Francoise | |
| 2017 | Professional Cuddler | Gloria | Short film |
| 2017 | The Leisure Seeker | Lillian | |
| 2018 | Ocean's Eight | Diana | |
| 2019 | Georgica | Dorothy | Short film |

=== Television ===
| Year | Title | Role | Notes |
|---|---|---|---|
| 1962 | The Beachcomber | Kahlana | Episode: "Tribal Law" |
| 1981 | Another World | Clinic Nurse | Episode: "#1.4336" |
| 1982 | Little Gloria... Happy at Last | | TV mini-series, Episode: "Part I" |
| 1982 | Macbeth | Witch | Television Film |
| 1986 | American Playhouse | Yvonne / Naomi Eisen | Episode: "Sunday in the Park with George" |
| 1986–1987 | Easy Street | Eleanor Standard | 22 episodes |
| 1989 | B.L. Stryker | Gabrielle Harwood | Episode: "Die Laughing" |
| 1985–1990 | Great Performances | Gertrude / Ariadne | 2 episodes |
| 1992 | A Child Lost Forever | Lois Jurgens | Television film |
| 1993 | Class of '61 | Mrs. Julia Peyton | Television film |
| 1993 | Mama's Back | Maureen | Television film |
| 1995 | Homicide: Life on the Street | Margie Bolander | 3 episodes |
| 1996 | Law & Order | Ms. Shore | Episode: "Girlfriends" |
| 1997 | Frasier | Ms. Langer | Episode: "Three Days of the Condo" |
| 1999 | A Lesson Before Dying | Edna Guidry | Television film |
| 2000 | Oz | Patricia Nathan | 2 episodes |
| 2001 | 100 Centre Street | Dr. Camille Willoughby | Episode: "Bottlecaps" |
| 2003 | The Practice | Judge Natalie Brown | Episode: "Cause of Action" |
| 2004 | Sex and the City | Trudy Stork | Episode: "Out of the Frying Pan" |
| 2005 | Monk | Mrs. Eels | Episode: "Mr. Monk and the Other Detective" |
| 2008 | The Return of Jezebel James | Molly | 2 episodes |
| 2010 | American Experience | Quaker Woman | Episode: "Dolley Madison" |
| 2010 | Ugly Betty | Roberta | Episode: "All the World's a Stage" |
| 2010 | Boardwalk Empire | Mrs. McGarry | 4 episodes |
| 2011 | The Importance of Being Earnest | Miss Prism | Television film |
| 2013 | The Big C | Nan | Episode: "Quality of Death" |
| 2015 | Odd Mom Out | Mrs. Hardwick | Episode: "Wheels Up" |
| 2017 | Madam Secretary | Nelly Conlon | Episode: "The Beautiful Game" |

=== Theater ===
| Year | Title | Role | Venue | Ref. |
|---|---|---|---|---|
| 1981 | Macbeth | Gentlewoman / Witch | Vivian Beaumont Theater, Broadway | |
| 1983 | Present Laughter | Monica Reed | Circle in the Square Theatre, Broadway | |
| 1984 | Heartbreak House | Lady Utterwood | Circle in the Square Theatre, Broadway | |
| 1984 | Sunday in the Park with George | Naomi Eisen / Yvonne | Booth Theatre, Broadway | |
| 1985 | Pack of Lies | Helen Kroger | Royale Theater, Broadway | |
| 1985 | The Marriage of Figaro | Countess | Circle in the Square Theatre, Broadway | |
| 1987 | Driving Miss Daisy | Daisy Werthan | Playwrights Horizons, Off-Broadway | |
| 1988 | Wenceslas Square | The Women | The Public Theater, Off-Broadway | |
| 1989 | Love Letters | Melissa Gardner | Promenade Theater, Off-Broadway | |
| 1989 | When I Was a Girl, I Used to Scream and Shout | Morag | South Coast Repertory, California | |
| 1990 | Hamlet | Gertrude | The Public Theater, Off-Broadway | |
| 1991 | The Subject Was Roses | Nettie Cleary | Roundabout Theater Company, Off-Broadway | |
| 1991 | Beggars in the House of Plenty | Ma | New York City Center, Off-Broadway | |
| 1992 | It's Only a Play | Julia Budder | Center Theatre Group, Los Angeles | |
| 1994 | Kindertransport | Evelyn | New York City Center, Off-Broadway | |
| 1995 | Indiscretions | Leonie | Ethel Barrymore Theatre, Broadway | |
| 1996 | Sex and Longing | Bridget McCrea | Cort Theatre, Broadway | |
| 1997 | The Last Night of Ballyhoo | Boo Levy | Helen Hayes Theatre, Broadway | |
| 1998 | Li'l Abner | Mammy Yokum | New York City Center | |
| 1998 | The Glass Menagerie | Amanda Wingfield | Williamstown Theatre Festival, Massachusetts | |
| 1998 | The Rivals | Mrs. Malaprop | Williamstown Theatre Festival, Massachusetts | |
| 1998 | The Uneasy Chair | Miss Amelia Pickett | Playwrights Horizons, Off-Broadway | |
| 1999 | The Death of Papa | Mary Vaughn | Hartford Stage, Connecticut | |
| 1999 | Tartuffe | Madame Pernelle | The Public Theater, Off-Broadway | |
| 1999 | Waiting in the Wings | Sylvia Archibald | Walter Kerr Theatre, Broadway | |
| 2001 | Major Barbara | Lady Britomart | American Airlines Theater, Broadway | |
| 2002 | Blithe Spirit | Madame Arcati | Bay Street Theater, New York | |
| 2003 | A Day in the Death of Joe Egg | Grace | American Airlines Theater, Broadway | |
| 2003 | Under Milk Wood | Second Voice | Williamstown Theatre Festival, Massachusetts | |
| 2003 | Henry IV | Lady Northumberland / Mistress Quickly | Vivian Beaumont Theatre, Broadway | |
| 2004 | Cat on a Hot Tin Roof | Big Mama | Kennedy Center for the Performing Arts, Washington, D.C. | |
| 2005 | The Rivals | Mrs. Malaprop | Vivian Beaumont Theatre, Broadway | |
| 2005 | Mrs. Warren's Profession | Mrs. Kitty Warren | Irish Repertory Theatre, Off-Broadway | |
| 2006 | Butley | Edna Shaft | Booth Theatre, Broadway | |
| 2008 | Home | Marjorie | Williamstown Theatre Festival, Massachusetts | |
| 2009 | The Savannah Disputation | Mary O’Brian | Playwrights Horizons, Off-Broadway | |
| 2010 | Happy Days | Winnie | Westport Country Playhouse, Connecticut | |
| 2011 | The Importance of Being Earnest | Miss Prism | American Airlines Theater, Broadway | |
| 2015 | A Little Night Music | Madame Armfeldt | American Conservatory Theater, San Francisco | |
| 2016 | The School for Scandal | Mrs. Candour | Lucille Lortel Theater, Off-Broadway | |

== Awards and nominations ==
| Organizations | Year | Category | Work | Result | Ref. |
|---|---|---|---|---|---|
| American Theater Hall of Fame | 2008 | Induction | Herself | Honored | |
| Drama Desk Awards | 1983 | Outstanding Featured Actress in a Play | Quartermaine's Terms | Nominated | |
| Drama Desk Awards | 1983 | Outstanding Featured Actress in a Play | Present Laughter | Nominated | |
| Drama Desk Awards | 1987 | Outstanding Actress in a Play | Driving Miss Daisy | Nominated | |
| Drama Desk Awards | 1997 | Outstanding Featured Actress in a Play | The Last Night of Ballyhoo / Sex and Longing | Won | |
| Tony Awards | 1984 | Best Featured Actress in a Musical | Sunday in the Park with George | Nominated | |
| Tony Awards | 1984 | Best Featured Actress in a Play | Heartbreak House | Nominated | |
| Tony Awards | 1997 | Best Featured Actress in a Play | The Last Night of Ballyhoo | Nominated | |
| Tony Awards | 2005 | Best Featured Actress in a Play | The Rivals | Nominated | |
| Tony Awards | 2007 | Best Featured Actress in a Play | Butley | Nominated | |

== See also ==
- List of Tony Award records
