= Lee Weaver =

American actor (1930–2025)

- Born: April 10, 1930; Fort Lauderdale, Florida, U.S.
- Died: September 22, 2025 (aged 95); Los Angeles, California, U.S.
- Occupation: Actor
- Years active: 1952–2022

Lee Wellington Weaver (April 10, 1930 – September 22, 2025) was an American actor known for his appearances in sitcoms like Easy Street and The Bill Cosby Show.

== Early life and career ==
Weaver was born in Fort Lauderdale, Florida on April 10, 1930, to Primus Jest and Josephine Weaver. He graduated from Florida A&M University and enlisted in the United States Army when he was 22.

He was the voice of Alpine in the animated television series G.I. Joe: A Real American Hero (1985–1986). Weaver played a friend of George Jefferson on "The Jeffersons" season three episode 16 "George's Guilt" (1977). Weaver was also the original mailman on 227 (1985). Weaver played the role of Ricardo in the television series Easy Street (1986–1987). He appeared as a blind seer in the film O Brother, Where Art Thou? (2000) and he also appeared in one episode of One World (2000), a situation-comedy television series. Weaver had a guest appearance on an episode of The Cosby Show as a waiter. He appeared as a Junkyard Owner in an episode of It's Always Sunny in Philadelphia.

Weaver also played the role of Ed Downer, a handyman who became an interest of Philip Banks' mom, on an episode of The Fresh Prince of Bel-Air. Perhaps his most memorable role was the exuberant exhibitionist "Buck Naked," who enlivened episodes of Steven Bochco's police dramas, Hill Street Blues and NYPD Blue.

== Personal life and death ==
Weaver was a childhood friend of Cannonball Adderley, and served as the best man at his wedding. On his 1963 album Nippon Soul, Adderley introduces the Yusef Lateef composition "The Weaver" as "dedicated to a...dear friend of everyone in the band, kind of a jive cat, but a beautiful cat. His name is Weaver, Lee Weaver. So the tune sounds somethin' like Lee Weaver. It's soulful, it's mean."

Weaver died at his home in Los Angeles, on September 22, 2025, at the age of 95.

== Filmography ==
=== Film ===
Year	Title	Role	Notes
1959	Al Capone	Reporter	Uncredited
1969	The Lost Man	Willis	
1971	Vanishing Point	Jake	
1973	Cleopatra Jones	Friend	
1978	House Calls	Anesthesiologist	
1978	Mean Dog Blues	Cheatem	
1978	Heaven Can Wait	Way Station Attendant	
1979	The Onion Field	Billy	
1982	Kiss Me Goodbye	Mr. King	
1984	The Buddy System	Ray	
1986	Wildcats	Maurice	
1987	G.I. Joe: The Movie	Alpine	
1990	The Two Jakes	Caddy #1	
1991	Grave Images	Bus Driver	
1994	The Scout	Ben	
1996	Just Your Luck	Wino	
1997	Fathers' Day	Airline Passenger	
1998	Music from Another Room	Porter	
1998	Goodbye Lover	Old Codger	
1998	Godzilla	Homeless Guy	
1998	Bulworth	Man in Church #2	
1998	How Stella Got Her Groove Back	Nate	
1998	Brown's Requiem	Wino	
1999	The Thirteenth Floor	30's Limo Driver	
2000	O Brother, Where Art Thou?	Blind Seer	
2001	Donnie Darko	Leroy	
2001	L.A.P.D.: To Protect and to Serve	Homeless Man Who Gets Shot	
2003	The Box	Joe	
2003	The Failures	Mr. Fishbau	
2005	A Bridal Fever	Ralph	
2005	The 40-Year-Old Virgin	Joe	
2006	Swedish Auto	Leroy	
2009	Little Fish, Strange Pond	Barney	
2010	The Company We Keep	Isaiah	
2013	Max Rose	Lee Miller	
2013	The Trials of Cate McCall	Mr. George	

=== Television ===
Year	Title	Role	Notes
1955–1956	Sheena: Queen of the Jungle	Lagi / Mauki / N'Gatsu	6 episodes
1967	Good Morning World	Cab nDriver	Episode: "Don't Call Us and We Won't Call You"
1967, 1968	I Spy	Senator's Valet / Bartender	2 episodes
1968	The Wild Wild West	Desk Clerk #2	Episode: "The Night of the Sedgewick Curse"
1969	Mannix	Dave	Episode: "Death in a Minor Key"
1969	Julia	Ned Bowman	Episode: "Home of the Braves"
1969	Insight	Stone	Episode: "Charlie, You Made the Night Too Long"
1969	Love, American Style	Ace	Episode: "Love and the Hustler"
1969	In Name Only	Bartender	Television film
1969–1971	The Bill Cosby Show	Brian Kincaid	7 episodes
1971	Nanny and the Professor	2nd Truck Driver	Episode: "The Prodigy"
1971	Cade's County	Kenneth Ringwald	Episode: "Delegate at Large"
1975	Adam-12	Neighbor	Episode: "Pressure Point"
1975	Guess Who's Coming to Dinner	Ralph Prentiss	Television film
1975	That's My Mama	Sammy Chambers	Episode: "Earl's Dad and Mama's Glad"
1975	Kojak	Ozzie Turnbull	Episode: "Out of the Frying Pan..."
1976	Sanford and Son	Mr. Quincy	Episode: "Greatest Show in Watts"
1976	Good Times	2nd Man	Episode: "The Big Move: Part 2"
1976	The Blue Knight	Mose / Frank Moseley	4 episodes
1976	Serpico	Scooter	Episode: "Danger Zone"
1977	The Jeffersons	Willie	Episode: "George's Guilt"
1977	Quincy, M.E.	Chambers	Episode: "The Hot Dog Murder"
1978	Soap	Sergeant	Episode #1.17
1978	Daddy, I Don't Like It Like This	Bob	Television film
1979	Starsky & Hutch	Boseman	Episode: "Huggy Can't Go Home"
1981	Flamingo Road	—N/a	5 episodes
1981	Palmerstown, U.S.A.	Loosley	Episode: "Roadhouse"
1981	Mork & Mindy	Gus	Episode: "My Dad Can't Beat Up Anybody"
1981	Shannon	—N/a	Episode: "Neither a Borrower"
1982–1984	Hill Street Blues	Buck Naked / Bartender	6 episodes
1983	Voyagers!	Dave	Episode: "All Fall Down"
1983	AfterMASH	Jones	Episode: "Klinger vs. Klinger"
1985	Diff'rent Strokes	Joe	Episode: "Blue Collar Drummond"
1985	Our Family Honor	—N/a	Episode: "Pilot"
1985	What's Happening Now!!	Ticket Clerk	Episode: "Aunt Shirley"
1985–1986	G.I. Joe	Alpine / Agent / Crimson Guard	22 episodes
1986	G.I. Joe: Arise, Serpentor, Arise!	Alpine	Television film
1986, 1987	227	Frank	2 episodes
1986–1987	Easy Street	Ricardo Williams	22 episodes
1987	Mr. President	Mort	Episode: "Dear Sam: Part 1"
1987	Webster	Henry	3 episodes
1987	A Hobo's Christmas	Biloxi Slim	Television film
1987, 1991	The Cosby Show	Mr. Fields / Waiter	2 episodes
1988	Amen	Man Who Stole the Money	Episode: "To Catch a Thief"
1988	The Magical World of Disney	Frank Munroe	Episode: "Meet the Munceys"
1989	The Edge	—N/a	Episode: "Black Pudding"
1990	Dear John	Snookie Reams	Episode: "John's New Job: Part 1"
1990	A Different World	Ray Nay	Episode: "Love Thy Neighbor"
1991	Dragnet	Augustus Murphy	Episode: "The Vandals"
1991	The Man in the Family	Mr. Mitchell	Episode: "Real News"
1991	The Fresh Prince of Bel-Air	Ed Downer	Episode: "Granny Gets Busy"
1991	Homefront	Reverend Harrington	Episode: "Patriots"
1991	MacGyver	Stumpy	Episode: "Gunz 'n Boyz"
1991	Reasonable Doubts	Stubblefield	2 episodes
1992	Nurses	Reverend Curtis	Episode: "Eat Something"
1992	Night Court	Mr. Burke	Episode: "Opportunity Knock Knocks: Part 2"
1992, 1995	Martin	Old Man / Bus Boy	2 episodes
1993	Step by Step	Leonard	Episode: "If I Were a Rich Man"
1993	The New Adventures of Superman	Supervisor	Episode: "Pilot"
1993	Lush Life	Harry	Television film
1993	Living Single	The Bartender	Episode: "Living Kringle"
1994	Roc	Ollie	Episode: "No Place Like Home"
1994	NYPD Blue	Buck Naked	3 episodes
1994	Sister, Sister	Priest	Episode: "Free Billy"
1995	A Season of Hope	Elmer	Television film
1995	Beverly Hills, 90210	Stan	Episode: "Fortunate Son"
1996	Sliders	Hilton Brown	Episode: "Invasion"
1996	Sparks	Mr. Bibbs	2 episodes
1996	The Jamie Foxx Show	Slewfoot Lou	Episode: "Seems Like Old Times"
1997	Temporarily Yours	Passenger #3	Episode: "Pilot"
1997	Chicago Hope	Earlee	Episode: "On Golden Pons"
1998	Good News	Beans	2 episodes
1999	Suddenly Susan	Clyde	Episode: "A Day in the Life"
1999	For Your Love	Church Member	Episode: "The Trouble with Angels"
2000	City of Angels	—N/a	Episode: "Prototype"
2000	Diagnosis: Murder	Isaiah	Episode: "A Resting Place"
2000	The District	Mr. Horton	Episode: "The Jackal"
2000	One World	Harold	Episode: "Roots"
2001	Kate Brasher	Harry Rosemont	Episode: "Tracy"
2001	Touched by an Angel	Candy McCloud	Episode: "The Perfect Game"
2001	Men, Women & Dogs	Buster	Episode: "The Magic Three-Legged Sex Dog"
2002	Any Day Now	Louis Nolman	Episode: "Call Him Macaroni"
2002	My Wife and Kids	Attendant	Episode: "Table for Too Many: Part 2"
2002	Providence	Willie Picks	Episode: "The Sound of Music"
2003	Crossing Jordan	Photo Shop Owner	Episode: "Ockham's Razor"
2003	The Parkers	Tebo	Episode: "Dead Clown Walking"
2003	A.U.S.A.	Alfred Montgomery	Episode: "Pilot"
2004	The Bernie Mac Show	Schooney	Episode: "Hair Jordan"
2004	Six Feet Under	James Dubois Marshall	Episode: "Coming and Going"
2005	Line of Fire	Albert Jones	Episode: "This Land Is Your Land"
2006	That's So Raven	Mr. Jenkins	Episode: "The Four Aces"
2006	Love, Inc.	Burt	Episode: "Cursed"
2006	Veronica Mars	Walter	Episode: "Charlie Don't Surf"
2007	It's Always Sunny in Philadelphia	Junkyard Owner	Episode: "Bums: Making a Mess All Over the City"
2008	CSI: Crime Scene Investigation	Kerwinkle Lord	Episode: "For Gedda"
2008	My Name Is Earl	Homeless Guy / Homeless Joe	2 episodes
2010	Party Down	William	Episode: "James Ellison Funeral"
2010	Community	Joe	Episode: "Messianic Myths and Ancient Peoples"
2011	Workaholics	Tim	Episode: "Model Kombat"
2013	Family Tools	Ellis Poynton	4 episodes
2015	Weird Loners	Mortician	Episode: "Weird Pilot"
2016	The Soul Man	Pat	Episode: "Boyce Don't Cry"
2017, 2020	Grace and Frankie	Mel Cordray	2 episodes
