= Driving Miss Daisy (play) =

1987 play by Alfred Uhry

- 2010 Playbill cover
- Original language: English
- Written by: Alfred Uhry
- Characters: Hoke Coleburn; Daisy Werthan; Boolie Werthan
- Series: Atlanta Trilogy: Driving Miss Daisy; The Last Night of Ballyhoo; Parade
- Genre: Drama

Premiere
- Date: 1987
- Place: Playwrights Horizons; New York City

Driving Miss Daisy is a play by American playwright Alfred Uhry, about the relationship of an elderly Southern Jewish woman, Daisy Werthan, and her African-American chauffeur, Hoke Coleburn, from 1948 to 1973. The play was the first in Uhry's Atlanta Trilogy, which deals with Jewish residents of that city in the early 20th century. The play won the 1988 Pulitzer Prize for Drama.

== Synopsis ==
1948 Atlanta, Georgia. A crash is heard, and Daisy Werthan, age 72, is in her living room, with her son Boolie, age 40. She has crashed her car, and Boolie insists that she have a driver. Boolie is in his office and interviews Hoke Coleburn who is a black man of around 60. He is unemployed. Over the next 25 years Hoke drives "Miss Daisy". They are initially wary of each other, and Hoke puts up with the somewhat crotchety Miss Daisy with dignity. She teaches Hoke to read when she learns that he cannot, which comes naturally to her, having been a teacher. Over the years, they form a bond. In the final scene, Miss Daisy is in a nursing home for increasing memory loss, but is lucid enough to tell Hoke, who has come to visit her, that he is her best friend.

== Background ==
The play was inspired by Alfred Uhry's grandmother, Lena Fox, her chauffeur, Will Coleman, and his father. His grandmother, a Jewish woman who lived in Atlanta during the 1960s, had to give up driving after a car accident, and hired Coleman, who drove her for 25 years.

Uhry wrote his Atlanta Trilogy based on his own experiences living in Atlanta as a Jew. He set his three plays in the context of major events that happened in Atlanta: Parade, based on the 1913–1915 trial and eventual lynching of Leo Frank; The Last Night of Ballyhoo, following the events at the city's 1939 Gone With the Wind premiere; and Driving Miss Daisy, addressing the impacts associated with the 1958 Hebrew Benevolent Congregation Temple bombing and the city’s dinner honoring Martin Luther King Jr.’s October 1964 Nobel Peace Prize.

== Historical casting ==
| Character | 1987 Off-Broadway cast | 1st National Tour cast | 2nd National Tour cast | 1989 Film cast | Original West End cast | 2010 Broadway cast | West End revival cast | Australian Tour Cast |
|---|---|---|---|---|---|---|---|---|
| Daisy Werthan | Dana Ivey | Julie Harris | Rosemary Prinz | Jessica Tandy | Wendy Hiller | Vanessa Redgrave | Vanessa Redgrave | Angela Lansbury |
| Hoke Coleburn | Morgan Freeman | Brock Peters | Ted Lange | Morgan Freeman | Clarke Peters | James Earl Jones | James Earl Jones | James Earl Jones |
| Boolie Werthan | Ray Gill | Stephen Root | Fred Sanders | Dan Aykroyd | Barry Foster | Boyd Gaines | Boyd Gaines | Boyd Gaines |

== Production history ==
Off-Broadway (1987–1990) The original Off-Broadway production was staged at Playwrights Horizons Studio Theatre on 42nd Street, opening on April 15, 1987. Directed by Ron Lagomarsino, the role of Daisy was also played by Rochelle Oliver and Frances Sternhagen, replacing Dana Ivey. It later transferred to the John Houseman Theatre, closing on June 3, 1990, with 1,195 performances.

US. National Tours and Regional National Tours were launched starting in 1988. Julie Harris was the Daisy for the 1st National Tour. Rosemary Prinz also played the role in a second tour.

The first production in Chicago was also a long-running production, originally starring Sada Thompson. Ellen Burstyn, Charlotte Rae, and Dorothy Loudon also played Miss Daisy as replacements.

West End (1988) The play was produced in London's West End in 1988 at the Apollo Theatre with Wendy Hiller as Miss Daisy.

1992 Television cast In 1992, the play was filmed for television as a possible series. This production starred Joan Plowright as Miss Daisy, with Robert Guillaume as Hoke and Saul Rubinek as Boolie.

Broadway (2010–2011) In October 2010, The play was staged for the first time on Broadway. The play opened on October 25, 2010, at the John Golden Theatre; the run was later extended and Driving Miss Daisy closed on April 9, 2011, after 20 previews and 180 performances. Maureen Anderman was Redgrave's understudy. It recouped its initial investment of $2.6 million on December 21, 2010, making it the first show of the 2010/2011 season to do so. The show was the top-grossing Broadway play in the week ending January 16, 2011.

West End revival (2011) The production played at Wyndham's Theatre in London's West End with the same cast, beginning previews on September 26, 2011, opening on October 5, 2011, and closing on December 17, 2011.

UK tour (2012–13) The show toured UK theatres from October 2012 until April 2013, starring Gwen Taylor, Don Warrington, and Ian Porter.

Australian tour (2013) The Broadway production of Driving Miss Daisy toured Australia from February 9 to June 16, 2013, starring Angela Lansbury, James Earl Jones and Boyd Gaines. This production was filmed and broadcast on PBS Great Performances.

== Awards and honors ==
| Year | Award | Category | Nominee | Result |
|---|---|---|---|---|
| 1987 | Obie Award | Best Performance | Dana Ivey | Won |
| 1988 | Outer Circle Critics Award | Best Off-Broadway Play | | Won |
| 1988 | Outer Circle Critics Award | Best Actress in a Play | Dana Ivey | Won |
| 1988 | Outer Circle Critics Award | Best Director | Ron Lagomarsino | Won |
| 1988 | Pulitzer Prize | Drama | | Won |
| 2011 | Tony Award | Best Actress in a Play | Vanessa Redgrave | Nominated |

== Film adaptation ==
Uhry adapted his play into the screenplay for a 1989 film of the same name starring Jessica Tandy, Morgan Freeman and Dan Aykroyd. All three actors were nominated for Academy Awards, with Tandy winning the Academy Award for Best Actress. The film received nine nominations total, and won the Academy Award for Best Picture. Uhry also won an Academy Award for his screenplay.
