= Boyd Gaines =

American actor (born 1953)

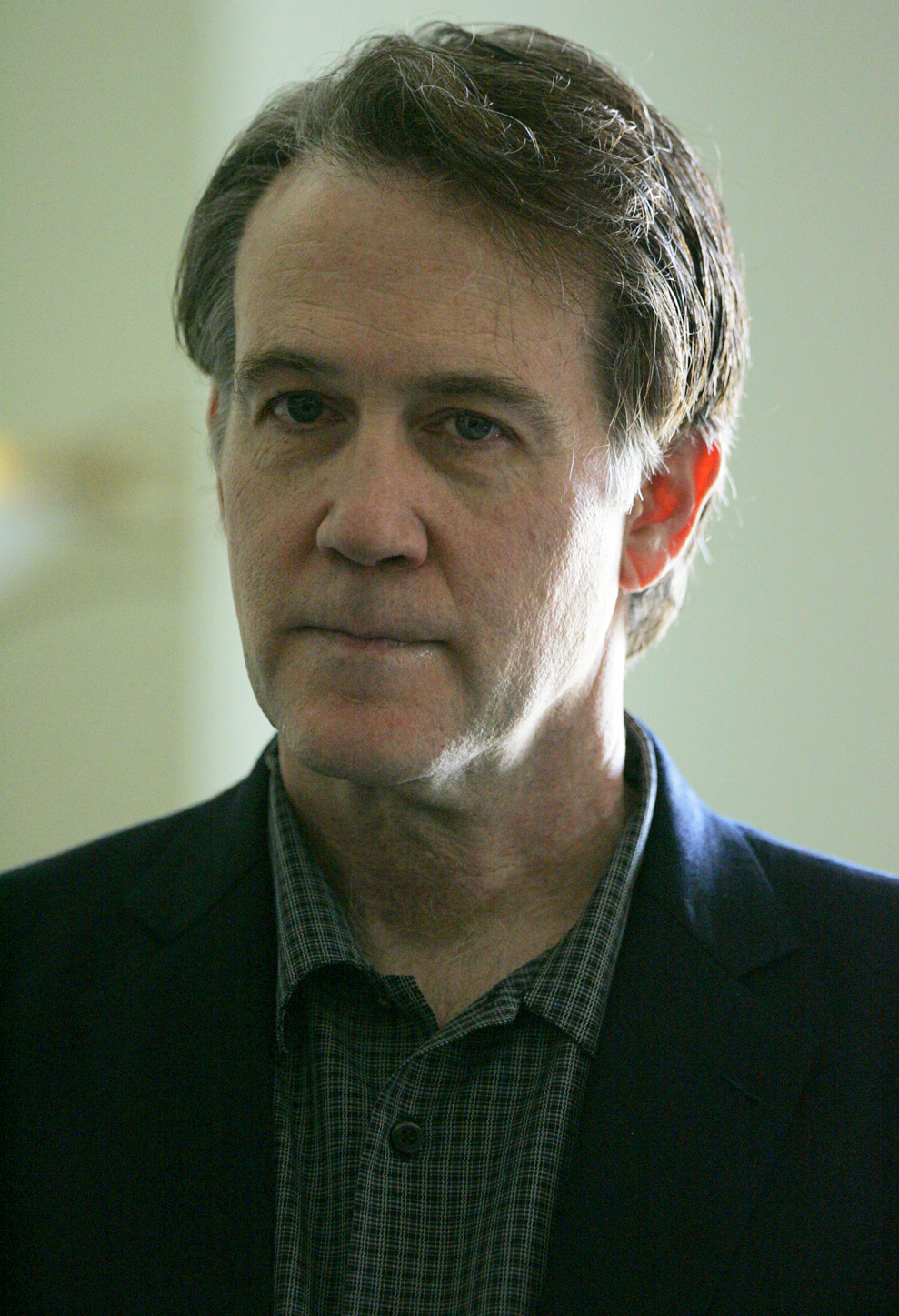
- Gaines in 2013
- Born: Boyd Payne Gaines; May 11, 1953 (age 73); Atlanta, Georgia, U.S.
- Education: Allan Hancock College; Juilliard School (BFA)
- Occupation: Actor
- Years active: 1978–present
- Spouse: Kathleen McNenny
- Children: 1

Boyd Payne Gaines (born May 11, 1953) is an American actor. During his career, he has won four Tony Awards and three Drama Desk Awards. Gaines is best known for playing Mark Royer on One Day at a Time (1981–1984).

== Early life and education ==
He was born in Atlanta, Georgia, to James and Ida Gaines. His early theatre training began at the Pacific Conservatory of the Performing Arts at Allan Hancock College in Santa Maria, California, where his talent and rich baritone voice were showcased in leading roles in plays, musicals, and opera. He attended the Juilliard School as a member of the Drama Division's Group 8 (1975–1979).

== Career ==
Gaines has appeared in a number of films and television shows, including Fame, Frasier, L.A. Law, Law & Order, and Piece of Cake, but his most notable television role was as Mark Royer, who married Valerie Bertinelli's Barbara Cooper on TV's One Day at a Time. Gaines appeared in the final three seasons of the show. He also portrayed Coach Brackett in the 1981 movie Porky's, Lt. Ring in the 1986 film Heartbreak Ridge and Jason in The Sure Thing (1985).

Gaines is a voice actor, and is credited with recording several audiobooks.

He has appeared on the Broadway stage, in both musicals and plays, for which he has won four Tony Awards. His first Broadway play was The Heidi Chronicles in 1989. He has appeared in the musicals She Loves Me (1993), Company (1995), and Contact (2000). Other plays have included the 2010 revival of Driving Miss Daisy, The Columnist (2012), and the Broadway revival of An Enemy of the People in 2012. He appeared in the 2008 revival of Gypsy as Herbie, and won the Tony Award for Best Featured Actor in a Musical.

He has appeared Off-Broadway, starting in 1978 with Spring Awakening and recently The Grand Manner by A. R. Gurney at Lincoln Center in 2010.

In regional theatre, Gaines appeared in Our Town at the George Street Playhouse, New Jersey, in April 2014.

== Awards and nominations ==
Gaines was nominated for a Tony Award for Best Actor in a Play in 2007, for Journey's End, making him the first actor to be nominated in each of the 4 Tony categories for which an actor is eligible. Only 2 male and 3 female performers have been nominated for all 4 Tony awards, the others being Raúl Esparza, Angela Lansbury, Jan Maxwell, and Audra McDonald. Gaines was the first performer to be nominated for each of Best Featured Actor in a Play in 1989 for The Heidi Chronicles, Best Actor in a Musical in 1994 for She Loves Me, Best Featured Actor in a Musical in 2000 for Contact and again in 2008 for Gypsy, and Best Actor in a Play in 2007 for Journey's End. Gaines won in three of the categories (and four of the five nominations), missing only for the performance in Journey's End. His four wins are for The Heidi Chronicles, She Loves Me, Contact, and Gypsy.

== Personal life ==
He is married to Kathleen McNenny. They have one daughter.

== Filmography ==
Film and television
Year	Title	Role	Notes
1980	Fame	Michael	Feature film
1981	Porky's	Coach Roy Brackett	Feature film
1981–84	One Day at a Time	Mark Royer	Main cast (52 episodes)
1984	Hotel	Jeff Strider	Episode: "Wedding"
1985	Evergreen	Chris Bradford	TV miniseries
1985	The Sure Thing	Jason	Feature film
1985	MacGruder and Loud	Ellis	Episode: "Tarnished Blues"
1985	Remington Steele	Todd Myerson	Episode: "Grappling Steele"
1985	Hotel	Steven Parker	Episode: "Hearts and Minds"
1986	Heartbreak Ridge	Lieutenant M.R. Ring	Feature film
1986	L.A. Law	Jim Perkins	Recurring role (4 episodes)
1986	Hotel	Rodger Gage	Episode: "Undercurrents"
1987	Ray's Male Heterosexual Dance Hall	Sam Logan	Short film
1988	Spenser: For Hire	Alfie Gainer	Episode: "Skeletons in the Closet"
1988	American Playhouse	Reverend Dobson	Episode: "Pigeon Feathers"
1988	Piece of Cake	Pilot Officer Chris Hart	TV miniseries
1988	Call Me	Bill	Feature film
1989	The Days and Nights of Molly Dodd	Imposter	Episode: "Here's a Rough Way to Learn a Foreign Language"
1990	A Son's Promise	Dan Weston	TV movie
1991	A Woman Named Jackie	Yusha Auchincloss	TV miniseries
1992	Anything but Love	College Professor	Episode: "Catherine Honey, I'm Home"
1992	Murder, She Wrote	John Halsey	Episode: "Programmed for Murder"
1993	Law & Order	Lieutenant St. Claire	Episode: "Conduct Unbecoming"
1994	Frasier	Phil Patterson	Episode: "The Candidate"
1995	The Grass Harp	Narrator (voice)	Feature film
1995	Law & Order	Nathan Barclay	Episode: "Wannabe"
1996	I'm Not Rappaport	Peter Danforth	Feature film
1997	Law & Order	Oliver Shain	Episode: "Matrimony"
1997	Caroline in the City	Jerry	Episode: "Caroline and the Wayward Husband"
1997	Remember WENN	Congressman Bob Farraday	Episode: "A Girl Like Maple"
1999	The Confession	Liam Clarke	Feature film
1999	Earthly Possessions	Announcer	TV movie
2001–02	The Education of Max Bickford	Paul Finazzio	2 episodes
2001–02	100 Centre Street	Casper Quince	2 episodes
2003	Queens Supreme	Steve Simon / Stan Standowski	Episode: "Flawed Heroes"
2004	Second Best	Richard	Feature film
2004	Law & Order	James Rillard	Episode: "Coming Down Hard"
2006	Angela's Eyes	Colin Anderson	Main cast (6 episodes)
2007	Lovely by Surprise	Customer #1	Feature film
2007	Funny Games	Fred	Feature film
2009	American Experience	Voice of Chairman Gray	Episode: "The Trials of J. Robert Oppenheimer"
2009	The Good Wife	Richard Chatham	Episode: "Home"
2010	The Robber Barons of Wall Street	Rupert Baron	Short film
2014	Driving Miss Daisy	Boolie Werthan	Theatrical release of Australian stage production
2015	American Odyssey	Harrison's Father	Episode: "Drop King"
2015	Great Performances	Boolie Werthan	Episode: "Driving Miss Daisy"
2016	No Pay, Nudity	Stephan	Feature film
2018	The Independents	Professor Green	Feature film
2018	Roses Are Blind	Uncle Oscar	Short film
2019	The Goldfinch	Chance Barbour	Feature film
2021	The Bite	Boyd Leithauser	2 episodes

== Stage productions ==
Broadway and Off-Broadway
Year	Title	Role	Theatre venue
July 7, 1978 – Jul 30, 1978	Spring Awakening	Melchior Gabor	Off-Broadway: Joseph Papp Public Theater
Dec 11, 1979 – Apr 5, 1980	A Month in the Country	Aleksei Belyayev	Off-Broadway: Roundabout Stage 1
Oct 21, 1980 – Nov 30, 1980	Vikings	Gunnar Larsen	Off-Broadway: Stage 73
Feb 19, 1987 – Mar 1, 1987	The Maderati	Chuck deButts	Off-Broadway: Playwrights Horizons
Nov 18, 1988 – Feb 19, 1989	The Heidi Chronicles	Peter Patrone	Off-Broadway: Playwrights Horizons
Mar 1, 1989 – Sep 3, 1989	The Heidi Chronicles	Peter Patrone	Broadway: Plymouth Theatre
Apr 28, 1992 – Jun 21, 1992	The Extra Man	Keith	Off-Broadway: New York City Center-Stage 1
Aug 6, 1992 – Aug 30, 1992	The Comedy of Errors	Antipholus of Ephesus	Off-Broadway: Delacorte Theater
Oct 14, 1992 – Dec 13, 1992	The Show-Off	Aubrey Piper	Broadway: Criterion Center Stage Right
Oct 7, 1993 – Jun 19, 1994	She Loves Me	Georg Nowack	Broadway: Brooks Atkinson Theatre
Oct 5, 1995 – Dec 3, 1995	Company	Robert	Broadway: Criterion Center Stage Right
Jun 11, 1996 – Jul 7, 1996	The Shawl	Garner Globalis	Off-Broadway: Playhouse 91 Theater
Nov 15, 1997 – Jan 4, 1998	Major Barbara	Cusins	Off-Broadway: Irish Repertory Theatre
Mar 2, 1999 – Jul 27, 1999	Cabaret	Clifford Bradshaw	Broadway: Studio 54
Oct 7, 1999 – Jan 2, 2000	Contact	Michael Wiley	Off-Broadway: Mitzi E. Newhouse Theater
Mar 2, 2000 – Sep 2, 2001	Contact	Michael Wiley	Broadway: Vivian Beaumont Theater
Oct 1, 2004 – May 15, 2005	Twelve Angry Men	Juror #8	Broadway: American Airlines Theatre
Nov 14, 2005 – Dec 18, 2005	Bach at Leipzig	Johann Friedrich Fasch	Off-Broadway: New York Theatre Workshop
Feb 8, 2007 – Jun 10, 2007	Journey's End	Lieutenant Osborne	Broadway: Belasco Theatre
Sep 21, 2007 – Dec 16, 2007	Pygmalion	Colonel Pickering	Broadway: American Airlines Theatre
Mar 3, 2008 – Jan 11, 2009	Gypsy	Herbie	Broadway: St. James Theatre
Jun 1, 2010 – Aug 1, 2010	The Grand Manner	Guthrie McClintic	Off-Broadway: Mitzi E. Newhouse Theater
Oct 7, 2010 – Apr 9, 2011	Driving Miss Daisy	Boolie Werthan	Broadway: John Golden Theatre
Apr 4, 2012 – Jul 8, 2012	The Columnist	Stewart Alsop	Broadway: Samuel J. Friedman Theatre
Sep 4, 2012 – Nov 18, 2012	An Enemy of the People	Dr. Thomas Stockmann	Broadway: Samuel J. Friedman Theatre

== Sources ==
- "Boyd Gaines Biography". filmreference. 2008.
- "Boyd Gaines Audio Books". AudioFile. 2008. Archived from the original on 2010-12-28.
