= London Suite (film) =

1996 American television film

- Based on: London Suite by Neil Simon
- Screenplay by: Neil Simon
- Directed by: Jay Sandrich
- Starring: Kelsey Grammer; Julia Louis-Dreyfus; Michael Richards; Madeline Kahn
- Theme music composer: Lee Holdridge
- Country of origin: United States
- Original language: English

Production
- Producer: Greg Smith
- Cinematography: Dennis Lewiston
- Editor: John Michel
- Running time: 120 minutes

Original release
- Network: NBC
- Release: September 15, 1996

London Suite is 1996 American television film directed by Jay Sandrich and starring Kelsey Grammer, Julia Louis-Dreyfus, Michael Richards and Madeline Kahn. It is based on Neil Simon's play of the same name.

== Cast ==
- Kelsey Grammer as Sydney Nichols
- Michael Richards as Mark Ferris
- Julia Louis-Dreyfus as Debra Dolby
- Madeline Kahn as Sharon Semple
- Jonathan Silverman as Paul Dolby
- Kristen Johnston as Grace Chapman
- Richard Mulligan as Dennis Cummings
- Patricia Clarkson as Diana Nichols
- Julie Hagerty as Anne Ferris
- Jane Carr as Mrs. Sitgood
- Paxton Whitehead as Dr. McMerlin
- Margot Steinberg as Lauren Semple
