= Robert Waldman =

American composer (born 1936)

Robert Waldman (born 1936) is an American composer, musical arranger, and orchestrator.

Waldman has collaborated with Alfred Uhry a number of times, first on the 1968 musical Here's Where I Belong, which closed after one performance (and 20 previews) on Broadway.

They had considerably better success with The Robber Bridegroom, which was produced on Broadway in both 1975 and 1976, enjoyed a year-long US national tour, and has become a staple of regional theatres. It garnered Waldman a Drama Desk Award nomination for Outstanding Music.

The Robber Bridegroom was revived Off-Broadway in March 2016 at the Roundabout Theatre Company and directed by Alex Timbers. This production won three Lucille Lortel Awards including Outstanding Revival.

Over the years he has composed, arranged, and orchestrated incidental music for the Broadway stagings of numerous dramatic plays, including The Rivals, Dinner at Eight, Ivanov, The Last Night of Ballyhoo, The School for Scandal, The Heiress, and Abe Lincoln in Illinois.

Performances of Waldman's compositions have been heard in film, television, ballets, numerous commercials, recordings and concert halls. G. Schirmer published illustrated collections of some forty of his piano compositions, among them A Swing Bag, A Rag Bag, A 3/4 Bag and A Santa Bag.
