= Messianic Myths and Ancient Peoples =

- Community episode
- Episode no.: Season 2 Episode 5
- Directed by: Tristram Shapeero
- Written by: Andrew Guest
- Production code: 205
- Original air date: October 21, 2010

Guest appearances
- John Oliver as Dr. Ian Duncan; Jim Rash as Dean Craig Pelton; Richard Erdman as Leonard; Lee Weaver as Joe; Alfred Dennis as Richard; Dino Stamatopoulos as Star-Burns

Episode chronology
← Previous "Basic Rocket Science"	Next → "Epidemiology"
- Community season 2

"Messianic Myths and Ancient Peoples" is the fifth episode of the second season of the American comedy television series Community, and the 30th episode of the series overall. It aired in the United States on NBC on October 21, 2010. The episode's plot surrounds a religious film created by Greendale Community College student Abed Nadir (Danny Pudi).

== Plot ==
Ian Duncan incompetently pretends to teach anthropology by showing viral videos from YouTube, which excites the students until Shirley (Yvette Nicole Brown) brings the class down by asking what videos can be found by searching for "God." Later, Shirley asks Abed to make a viral video promoting a Christian message, but he's not interested. Meanwhile, Pierce (Chevy Chase) grows tired of being mocked by his younger friends, and starts hanging out with a group of elderly scofflaws called the "Hipsters," named for the fact that they've all had hip replacements.

Abed finds Shirley in the library and tells her he's read the entire New Testament at her earlier suggestion. Abed is drawn to the story and the character of Jesus, but he wants to approach it in a new way and envisions a "Jesus movie for the post-post-modern world." Unfortunately for Shirley, Abed's idea is an impenetrable story called ABED and starring himself about a filmmaker exploring Jesus, involving the filmmaker realizing that he is in some way Jesus and the camera is God. Shirley is unimpressed and disassociates herself from the project.

The Hipsters play poker while drinking liquor; Leonard advises Pierce to pretend that they're playing bingo if they're caught. Dean Pelton (Jim Rash) walks in, and Pierce convinces him to allow the game to continue by pretending to be befuddled due to age. Pierce's ruse earns him the respect of his peers, presenting a contrast to how the study group views him.

Shirley continues in her mission, convincing Jehovah's Witness Troy and atheist Britta to reluctantly help with her Jesus rap video. They are interrupted by Abed, who has convinced the student body that they are part of something important. Out on the lawn the students are all gathered around Abed as he continues filming his epic. Enraptured Greendale students discuss the film and flock to Abed to ask questions about his work. When Shirley protests, the other students accuse her of being a Pharisee, and she runs off.

Troy alerts the rest of the study group to Pierce's late-night shenanigans with the Hipsters. Pierce and Leonard are drinking out of paper bags when Dean Pelton emerges from his Prius with Shirley, leaving his keys behind. Pierce is talked into a drunken joyride in the dean's car with the other Hipsters. They crash at extremely low speed into a light pole because one of their members has a bout of sudden genuine confusion. Pierce stays with him as the other Hipsters run off. In the cafeteria, the dean explains that Shirley has filed an official complaint on the grounds of separation of church and state but is convinced by Abed that his film is not about Jesus, as it is allegorical.

Abed realizes in post-production that his film is a "self-indulgent, adolescent mess" that will ensure that he never has a real career. He prays to God to save him from himself. Shirley overhears him and destroys the equipment with a baseball bat, ensuring that the film will never be seen.

Jeff, after being called by the administration, reluctantly comes to collect Pierce and learns that Leonard only acts this way because his kids abandoned him. In anthropology class again, Abed convinces the professor to show the film Shirley had imagined, which he had unbeknownst to her completed—a video of Troy rapping about Jesus.

== Cultural references ==
Director and screenwriter Charlie Kaufman is mentioned more than once in the episode. The dialogue between Abed and Shirley about film within a film resembles Kaufman's film Synecdoche, New York. It is also referencing another one of Kaufman's movie Adaptation (film).

Troy's rap video at the end of the episode is a clear nod towards the song "Jesus Walks" by Kanye West as well as perhaps to Donald Glover's burgeoning career as his rap persona Childish Gambino.

== Reception ==
Around 4.46 million Americans watched "Messianic Myths and Ancient Peoples".

Emily VanDerWerff of The A.V. Club rated the episode A, citing the fact that the show's structure creates believable opportunities for people with different beliefs to interact and engage with one another. She also focuses approvingly on the fact that Shirley and Pierce, unlikely comedic heroes, are given the reins in this particular episode.
