= Paxton Whitehead =

English actor (1937–2023)

- Publicity Photo of Paxton Whitehead
- Born: Francis Edward Paxton Whitehead; 17 October 1937; East Malling, Kent, England
- Died: 16 June 2023 (aged 85); Arlington County, Virginia, U.S.
- Education: Webber Douglas Academy of Dramatic Art
- Occupations: Actor; theatre director; playwright
- Years active: 1956–2018
- Spouses: Patricia Gage (m. 1971; div. 1986) Katherine Jane Robertson (m. 1987; died 2009)
- Children: 2

Francis Edward Paxton Whitehead (17 October 1937 – 16 June 2023) was an English actor and theatre director. He was nominated for a Tony Award and a Drama Desk Award for his performance as Pellinore in the 1980 revival of Camelot. Whitehead had many Broadway roles. He was also known for his film roles, most memorably Rodney Dangerfield's foil in Back to School, and for his many guest appearances on several U.S. television shows: he portrayed Bernard Thatch on The West Wing, and in the 1990s often appeared in recurring and guest roles on major sitcoms, such as Frasier, Caroline in the City, Ellen, 3rd Rock from the Sun, The Drew Carey Show, Mad About You, and Friends.

== Early life ==
Paxton Whitehead was born in East Malling and Larkfield, Kent on 17 October 1937, the son of Louise (née Hunt) and Charles Parkin Whitehead. His father was a lawyer. He trained at London's Webber Douglas Academy of Dramatic Art beginning when he was 17 years old.

== Career ==
Whitehead worked in repertory, small touring companies that rehearsed and performed a new play each week. In 1958, he was signed by the Royal Shakespeare Company. In 1961, Whitehead directed Doric Wilson's first play to be performed, And He Made a Her, a comedy that was an off-off-Broadway production at the Caffe Cino. He made his Broadway debut in The Affair (1962) after appearing in Canadian stage and television productions.

Whitehead replaced Jonathan Miller in the Broadway production of Beyond the Fringe in 1964 and appeared on the LP recording of the show, Beyond the Fringe '64. He went on to appear with the American Shakespeare Company to direct in regional repertory.

In 1967 Whitehead succeeded Barry Morse as artistic director of Ontario's Shaw Festival, the only repertory company dedicated to the works of George Bernard Shaw. Under his leadership, it continued to develop into an international event. During his tenure he was able to push through a plan of building the purpose-built 869-seat state-of-the-art Festival Theatre to expand considerably the capacity for audiences at Niagara-on-the-Lake. Queen Elizabeth II, Indira Gandhi, and Pierre Trudeau were among those who attended performances at the Shaw Festival Theatre during its inaugural season in 1973. He served until 1977 and appeared in productions as an actor. His notable appearances included The Apple Cart, Major Barbara, The Philanderer, Arms and the Man, Misalliance, and Heartbreak House with Jessica Tandy. Whitehead and Suzanne Grossman adapted Georges Feydeau's plays There's One in Every Marriage for the Broadway stage in 1971 and Chemin de Fer in 1974.

Whitehead received an honorary degree in arts from Trent University in 1978 and earned an Antoinette Perry "Tony" Award nomination for Camelot in 1980. He appeared in numerous Broadway productions including My Fair Lady with Richard Chamberlain, The Harlequin Studies with Bill Irwin, Noël Coward's Suite in Two Keys, Peter Shaffer's Lettice and Lovage, London Suite by Neil Simon, and as Sherlock Holmes in The Crucifer of Blood.

Whitehead was well known for his film roles and many guest and recurring appearances on television shows, especially many of the top sitcoms from the 1990s such as Frasier, Caroline in the City, Ellen, 3rd Rock from the Sun, The Drew Carey Show, Mad About You, and Friends. He also appeared on Magnum, P.I., Murder, She Wrote, Law & Order, The West Wing, and many more. In 2007, he played Graham Hainsworth in Desperate Housewives, the father of Susan Mayer's fiancé, Ian.

In later years, Whitehead continued to work in regional theatre and on Broadway. Whitehead appeared in the role of Phil at the Westport Country Playhouse in Westport, Connecticut from 12–27 July 2007 in Relatively Speaking, a comedy. Whitehead began previews of The Importance of Being Earnest by Oscar Wilde on Broadway at the American Airlines Theatre on 17 December 2010 in the role of Reverend Canon Chasuble. The show opened on 13 January 2011 and was filmed live on 11/12 March 2011 for broadcast in June 2011. He played the role of George Bernard Shaw in Anthony Wynn's Bernard and Bosie: A Most Unlikely Friendship in a benefit performance for the Episcopal Actors' Guild on 5 May 2011.

Whitehead was an associate artist of the Old Globe Theatre in San Diego. He performs on recordings of Shaw's The Doctor's Dilemma and Harley Granville-Barker's The Voysey Inheritance.

== Personal life ==
Whitehead's first marriage, to Patricia Gage, ended with their divorce in 1986. He was then married to Katherine Robinson from 1987 until she died in 2009. He had two children.

== Death ==
Whitehead lived in Arlington County, Virginia, in his final years. He died from complications of a fall at a hospital in Arlington, on 16 June 2023, at age 85.

== Selected performances ==
=== Stage actor ===
| Year | Title | Role | Theater | Location | References |
|---|---|---|---|---|---|
| 1949 | The Epilogue | Kentish Colt | The Old Stagers Theatre | Canterbury, England | |
| 1956 | All for Mary | Alphonse | Devonshire Park Lawn Tennis Club | Eastbourne, England | |
| 1958 | Hamlet | Francisco | Royal Shakespeare Company (tour) | Moscow and Leningrad, Soviet Union | |
| 1959 | The Grass Is Greener | Earl of Rhyall | Royal Shakespeare Company (tour) | United Kingdom | |
| 1960 | Pygmalion | Freddie | Royal Shakespeare Company (tour) | United Kingdom | |
| 1960 | Hamlet | Francisco | Royal Shakespeare Company | Stratford-upon-Avon, England | |
| 1961 | The Grass is Greener | Sellars | Theatre Royal | Bath, Somerset, England | |
| 1961 | Gallows Humor | | Gramercy Arts Theatre | Manhattan, New York City, New York | |
| 1961 | One Way Pendulum | Prosecuting Counsel | East 74th Street Theater | Manhattan, New York City, New York | |
| 1962 | Electra | A Peasant | Player's Theatre | Manhattan, New York City, New York | |
| 1962 | The Affair | Gilbert Dawson-Hill | Henry Miller's Theatre | Manhattan, New York City, New York | |
| 1962 | Beyond the Fringe | Jonathan Miller (replacement) | John Golden Theatre | Manhattan, New York City, New York | |
| 2 February 1963 – 31 March 1963 | A Doll's House | Torvald Helmer | Theatre Four | Hell's Kitchen, Manhattan, New York City, New York | |
| 1963 | Henry V | Gower | American Shakespeare Festival | Stratford, Connecticut, US | |
| 1963 | King Lear | King of France | American Shakespeare Festival | Stratford, Connecticut, US | |
| 1964 | The Country Wife | Horner | Front Street Theatre | Memphis, Tennessee, US | |
| 1964 | My Fair Lady | Henry Higgins | Front Street Theatre | Memphis, Tennessee, US | |
| 1964 | The Rivals | Jack Absolute | Charles Playhouse | Boston, Massachusetts, US | |
| 1965 | The Entertainer | Archie Rice | Hartford Stage Company | Hartford, Connecticut, US | |
| 1965 | Major Barbara | Adolphus Cusins | Playhouse in the Park | Cincinnati, Ohio, US | |
| 1965 | Heartbreak House | Randall Underwood | Royal Manitoba Theatre Centre | Winnipeg, Manitoba, Canada | |
| 1965 | The Public Eye | Christoforou | Royal Manitoba Theatre Centre | Winnipeg, Manitoba, Canada | |
| 1965 | The Importance of Being Earnest | Algernon | Royal Manitoba Theatre Centre | Winnipeg, Manitoba, Canada | |
| 1966 | The Importance of Being Earnest | John Worthing | Canadian Players | Toronto, Ontario, Canada | |
| 1966 | Misalliance | Lord Summerhays | Shaw Festival | Niagara-on-the-Lake, Ontario, Canada | |
| 1966 | The Apple Cart | Magnus | Shaw Festival | Niagara-on-the-Lake, Ontario, Canada | |
| 1967 | Arms and the Man | Sergius | Shaw Festival | Niagara-on-the-Lake, Ontario, Canada | |
| 1967 | Major Barbara | Adolphus Cusins | Shaw Festival | Niagara-on-the-Lake, Ontario, Canada | |
| 1968 | Heartbreak House | Hector Hushabye | Shaw Festival | Niagara-on-the-Lake, Ontario, Canada | |
| 1968 | The Chemmy Circle | Coustilliou | Shaw Festival | Niagara-on-the-Lake, Ontario, Canada | |
| 1968 | Charley's Aunt | | Studio Arena Theatre | Buffalo, New York | |
| 1969 | Chemin de Fer | | Mark Taper Forum | Los Angeles, California | |
| 5–14 November 1969 | Rondelay | | Hudson West Theatre | New York City, New York | |
| 1969 | The Doctor's Dilemma | Dubedat | Shaw Festival | Niagara-on-the-Lake, Ontario, Canada | |
| 1969 | The Guardsman | The actor | Shaw Festival | Niagara-on-the-Lake, Ontario, Canada | |
| 1970 | Forty Years On | Tempest | Shaw Festival | Niagara-on-the-Lake, Ontario, Canada | |
| 1970 | The Chemmy Circle | | Arena Stage | Washington, D.C. | |
| 1970 | Heartbreak House | Hector Hushabye | Goodman Memorial Theatre | Chicago, Illinois | |
| 1970 | The Brass Butterfly | The Emperor | Chelsea Theatre Center | Manhattan, New York City, New York | |
| 1970 | Candida | Reverend Alexander Mill | Longacre Theatre | Manhattan, New York City, New York | |
| 1971 | The Philanderer | Charteris | Shaw Festival | Niagara-on-the-Lake, Ontario, Canada | |
| 1971 | Tonight at 8:30 | Lead roles | Shaw Festival | Niagara-on-the-Lake, Ontario, Canada | |
| 1973 | You Never Can Tell | Valentine | Shaw Festival | Niagara-on-the-Lake, Ontario, Canada | |
| 1973 | Fanny's First Play | Savoyard | Shaw Festival | Niagara-on-the-Lake, Ontario, Canada | |
| 1974 | Charley's Aunt | Fancourt Babberley | Shaw Festival | Niagara-on-the-Lake, Ontario, Canada | |
| 24 November 1975 – 15 February 1976 | Habeas Corpus | Canon Throbbing; Arthur Wicksteed (replacement) | Martin Beck Theatre | Manhattan, New York City, New York | |
| 1975 | The Devil's Disciple | Burgoyne | Shaw Festival | Niagara-on-the-Lake, Ontario, Canada | |
| 1976 | Arms and the Man | Sergius | Shaw Festival | Niagara-on-the-Lake, Ontario, Canada | |
| 1976 | The Apple Cart | Magnus | Shaw Festival | Niagara-on-the-Lake, Ontario, Canada | |
| 1976 | The Millionairess | Adrian | Shaw Festival | Niagara-on-the-Lake, Ontario, Canada | |
| 1977 | Thark | Ronnie Gamble | Shaw Festival | Niagara-on-the-Lake, Ontario, Canada | |
| 1978 | The Crucifer of Blood | Sherlock Holmes | Helen Hayes Theatre | Manhattan, New York City, New York | |
| 1979 | Travesties | Henry Carr | Royal Manitoba Theatre Centre | Winnipeg, Manitoba, Canada | |
| 1979 | The Crucifer of Blood | Sherlock Holmes | Elitch Gardens Theatre | Denver, Colorado, US | |
| 1980 | The Trials of Oscar Wilde | Oscar Wilde | The Citadel Theatre | Edmonton, Alberta, Canada | |
| 1980 | Thark | Ronnie Gamble | Philadelphia Drama Guild | Philadelphia, Pennsylvania, US | |
| 1980 | Twelfth Night | Malvolio | Philadelphia Drama Guild | Philadelphia, Pennsylvania, US | |
| 1980 | Camelot | King Pellinore | New York State Theatre | Manhattan, New York City, New York | |
| 1981 | The Pirates of Penzance | Sergeant of police | Ahmanson Theatre | Los Angeles, California | |
| 1982 | The Miser | Harpagon | Old Globe Theatre | San Diego, California | |
| 1983 | Heartbreak House | Hector | Theatre Royal | London, England | |
| 1983 | The Rivals | Anthony Absolute | Old Globe Theatre | San Diego, California | |
| 1983 | Noises Off | Frederick Fellows | Brooks Atkinson Theatre | Manhattan, New York City, New York | |
| 1985 | Richard III | Richard III | Old Globe Theatre | San Diego, California | |
| 1983–1985 | Noises Off | Freddy | Brooks Atkinson Theatre | Manhattan, New York City, New York | |
| 1986 | Much Ado About Nothing | Benedick | Old Globe Theatre | San Diego, California | |
| 1989 | Run for Your Wife | Stanley Gardner | Virginia Theatre | Manhattan, New York City, New York | |
| 30 November 1989 – 31 December 1989 | Artist Descending a Staircase | Martello | Helen Hayes Theatre | Manhattan, New York City, New York | |
| 25 March 1990 – 23 December 1990 | Lettice and Lovage | Mr. Bardolph | Ethel Barrymore Theatre | Manhattan, New York City, New York | |
| 25 March 1992 – 23 December 1992 | A Little Hotel on the Side | Mathieu | Belasco Theatre | Manhattan, New York City, New York | |
| 9 December 1993 – 1 May 1994 | My Fair Lady | Colonel Pickering | Virginia Theatre | Manhattan, New York City, New York | |
| 28 March 1995 – 3 September 1995 | London Suite | Billy, Sidney, and Dr. McMerlin | Union Square Theatre | Manhattan, New York City, New York | |
| 1997 | Out of Order | Richard Willey | Paper Mill Playhouse | Millburn, New Jersey, US | |
| 1998 | The Mask of Moriarty | Sherlock Holmes | Paper Mill Playhouse | Millburn, New Jersey, US | |
| 1998 | The Rocky Horror Show | Narrator | Tiffany Theater | Hollywood, California | |
| 10 April 2000 – 16 April 2000 | A Suite in Two Keys: A Song at Twilight | Sir Hugo Latymer | Mirage Theater Company, Lucille Lortel Theatre | West Village, New York City, New York | |
| 10 April 2000 – 16 April 2000 | A Suite in Two Keys Shadows of the Evening | George Hilgay | Mirage Theater Company, Lucille Lortel Theatre | West Village, New York City, New York | |
| 2001 | Xanadu Live | Male | The Gascon Center Theatre | Culver City, California | |
| 2001 | Twelfth Night | Malvolio | Old Globe Theatre | San Diego, California | |
| 2001 | The Circle | Clive Champion-Cheney | South Coast Repertory | Costa Mesa, California | |
| 2002 | Where's Charley? | Mr. Spettigue | Williamstown Theatre Festival | Williamstown, Massachusetts, US | |
| 2003 | The Voysey Inheritance | Mr. Voysey | Walnut Street Theatre | Philadelphia, Pennsylvania, US | |
| 23 September 2003 – 9 November 2003 | The Harlequin Studies | Pantalone | Peter Norton Space | New York City, New York | |
| 2004 | What the Butler Saw | Dr. Rance | Boston University Theatre | Boston, Massachusetts, US | |
| 18 October 2005 – 4 December 2005 | Absurd Person Singular | Ronald | Biltmore Theatre | Manhattan, New York City, New York | |
| 12–27 July 2007 | Relatively Speaking | Phil | Westport Country Playhouse | Westport, Connecticut, US | |
| 1–26 April 2008 | Time of My Life | Gerry Stanton | Westport Country Playhouse | Westport, Connecticut, US | |
| 13–24 August 2008 | Home | | Williamstown Theatre Festival | Williamstown, Massachusetts, US | |
| 28 July 2009 – 15 August 2009 | How the Other Half Loves | Frank Foster | Westport Country Playhouse | Westport, Connecticut, US | |
| 16 October 2009 – 1 November 2009 | She Stoops to Conquer | Mr. Hardcastle | Matthews Theatre | New York City, New York | |
| 15 April 2010 – 16 May 2010 | Time of My Life | Gerry | O'Reilly Theater | Pittsburgh, Pennsylvania, US | |
| 7 September 2010 – 24 October 2010 | All's Well That Ends Well | Lafeau | Lansburgh Theatre | Washington, D.C. | |
| 4 October 2010 | Bedroom Farce | | Westport Country Playhouse | Westport, Connecticut, US | |
| 5 November 2010 | A Song at Twilight | | Westport Country Playhouse | Westport, Connecticut, US | |
| 13 January 2011 | The Importance of Being Earnest | Rev. Canon Chasuble | Roundabout Theatre Company, American Airlines Theatre | Manhattan, New York City, New York | |
| 7 June 2011 | The Circle | Lord Champion-Cheney | Westport Country Playhouse | Westport, Connecticut, US | |
| 27 July 2011 – 7 August 2011 | She Stoops to Conquer | | Williamstown Theatre Festival | Williamstown, Massachusetts, US | |
| 9 April 2014 – 11 May 2014 | The Heir Apparent | Geronte | Classic Stage Company, East 13th Street Theater | Manhattan, New York City, New York | |
| 12 November 2014 – 21 December 2014 | What the Butler Saw | | Mark Taper Forum, Los Angeles Music Center | Los Angeles, California | |
| 2018 | Bernhardt/Hamlet | Louis (replacement) | American Airlines Theatre | Manhattan, New York City, New York | |

=== Stage director ===
- The Circle, Shaw Festival, 1967
- The Chemmy Circle, Shaw Festival, 1968
- A Flea in Her Ear, Charles Playhouse, 1969
- Forty Years On, Shaw Festival, 1970
- The Secretary Bird, Main Stage, Vancouver, British Columbia, Canada, 1970
- The Chemmy Circle, Main Stage, Vancouver, British Columbia, Canada, 1971
- The Sorrows of Frederick, Main Stage, Vancouver, British Columbia, Canada, 1971
- Misalliance, Shaw Festival, 1972
- Getting Married, Shaw Festival, 1972
- Charley's Aunt, Shaw Festival, 1972
- Widowers' Houses, Shaw Festival, 1973
- Arms and the Man, Main Stage, Vancouver, British Columbia, Canada, 1973
- The Crucifer of Blood, Elitch Gardens Theatre, Denver, Colorado, USA, 1979
- Misalliance, Walnut Street Theatre, Philadelphia, PA, then Old Globe Theatre, San Diego, USA, 1982
- The Real Thing, Seattle Repertory Theatre, WA, USA, 1986
- Beyond the Fringe, Old Globe Theatre, San Diego, transferring to the Los Angeles Theatre Centre, USA, 1986

=== Filmography ===
==== Film ====
| Year | Title | Role | Notes | References |
|---|---|---|---|---|
| 1979 | Riel | McDougall | | |
| 1986 | Back to School | Dr. Phillip Barbay | | |
| 1986 | The Alan King Show | John Emerson | TV | |
| 1986 | Jumpin' Jack Flash | Lord Malcolm Billings | | |
| 1987 | Baby Boom | Center Instructor | | |
| 1988 | Tales from the Hollywood Hills: The Old Reliable | Phipps | TV | |
| 1990 | Chips, the War Dog | Smythe | | |
| 1991 | Child of Darkness, Child of Light | Father Rosetti | TV | |
| 1991 | An Inconvenient Woman | Hector Paradiso | TV | |
| 1991 | Rover Dangerfield | Count | Voice | |
| 1992 | Hale the Hero | General Howe | TV | |
| 1992 | Boris and Natasha: The Movie | Anton/Kreeger Paulovitch | | |
| 1993 | The Adventures of Huck Finn | Harvey Wilks | | |
| 1993 | 12:01 | Dr. Tiberius Scott | TV | |
| 1993 | My Boyfriend's Back | Judge in Heaven | | |
| 1994 | Trick of the Eye | Deane | TV | |
| 1995 | Goldilocks and the Three Bears | McReady | | |
| 1996 | London Suite | Dr. McMerlin | TV | |
| 1997 | RocketMan | British Reporter | | |
| 1999 | The Duke | Basil Rathwood | | |
| 1999 | Wakko's Wish | King Salazar | Voice, Direct to video | |
| 2001 | Kate & Leopold | Uncle Millard | | |
| 2011 | The Importance of Being Earnest | Rev. Canon Chasuble | Final role | |

==== Television ====
| Year | Title | Episode | Role | Notes | References |
|---|---|---|---|---|---|
| 1974 | The National Dream: Building the Impossible Railway | The Horrid B.C. Business | Lord Dufferin | TV mini-series | |
| 1974 | Performance | Village Wooing | | | |
| 1982 | Magnum, P.I. | Foiled Again | William Troubshaw | | |
| 1982 | Hart to Hart | Hart and Sole | Patrick Burke | | |
| 1982 | Hart to Hart | Rich and Hartless | Gordon Chumley | | |
| 1986 | The A-Team | Beneath the Surface | Morgan | | |
| 1987 | Down and Out in Beverly Hills | Jerry Jumps Right In | Derek | | |
| 1987–1988 | Marblehead Manor | Regular cast | Albert Dudley the Butler | | |
| 1988 | Baby Boom | The Right School for Elizabeth | Dr. Whittaker | | |
| 1989 | The Nutt House | My Man Tarkington | Alec Creed | | |
| 1989 | Murder, She Wrote | The Grand Old Lady | Captain Oliver | | |
| 1991 | Law & Order | The Troubles | Fenwick | | |
| 1992 | Dinosaurs | The Clip Show and The Clip Show II | Sir David Tushingham | Voice | |
| 1992 | Dinosaurs | Charlene's Flat World | Judge | Voice | |
| 1992–1999 | Mad About You | Recurring character | Hal Conway | | |
| 1993 | Almost Home | The Fox and the Hound | Sir Reginald Harrington | | |
| 1995 | Simon | Regular cast | Duke Stone | | |
| 1995–1996 | Ellen | Recurring character | Dr. Whitcomb | | |
| 1996 | The Real Adventures of Jonny Quest | The Darkest Fathoms | Commander | Voice | |
| 1996 | Caroline in the City | Caroline and the Cat Dancer | Cats Producer | | |
| 1996 | 3rd Rock from the Sun | World's Greatest Dick | Dr. Menard | | |
| 1996 | Frasier | A Lilith Thanksgiving | Dr. Campbell | | |
| 1997 | Liberty! The American Revolution | Recurring character | Horace Walpole | | |
| 1998 | Early Edition | Romancing the Throne | Vesti | | |
| 1998 | Friends | Recurring character | Mr. Waltham | | |
| 2000 | The West Wing | Noël | Bernard Thatch | | |
| 2001 | Dead Last | To Live and Amulet Die | Chancellor Johns | | |
| 2002 | The Drew Carey Show | Rich Woman, Poor Man | Helford | | |
| 2003 | Charlie Lawrence | It's Not One Thing, It's Your Mother | British Ambassador | | |
| 2004 | The West Wing | A Change Is Gonna Come | Bernard Thatch | | |
| 2007 | Desperate Housewives | Dress Big | Graham Hainsworth | | |

== Selected works ==
- Feydeau, Georges (1968). Grossmann, Suzanne; Whitehead, Paxton (eds.). Chemin de Fer; a play in four acts [The Chemmy Circle] (play). London: Samuel French, Inc. ISBN 978-0-573-60694-6. OCLC 317851280.
- Feydeau, Georges (1973). Grossmann, Suzanne; Whitehead, Paxton (eds.). There's One in Every Marriage (play). Kroll. LCCN 72050652.
- Feydeau, Georges (27 May 1982). Grossmann, Suzanne; Whitehead, Paxton (eds.). La Puce à l'oreille [A Flea in Her Ear] (play). London: Kroll.
