= Sara Topham =

Canadian actress (born 1976)

- Born: 1976 (age 49–50); Victoria, British Columbia, Canada
- Occupation: Actress

Sara Topham (born 1976) is a Canadian actress. She is primarily associated with stage roles at the Stratford Shakespeare Festival in Ontario, Canada.

== Background ==
Sara Topham was born and raised in Victoria, British Columbia, Canada, in 1976. She graduated from drama school at the University of Victoria in 1998.

== Stratford Shakespeare Festival credits ==
Topham has played several major stage roles over the course of 13 years (2000 to 2011 and 2013) at the Stratford Shakespeare Festival, specializing in ingénue-type figures in comedies and also sensitive and vulnerable types in dramas.

- Henry V (2001) by William Shakespeare – Princess Katherine
- All's Well That Ends Well (2002) by William Shakespeare – Diana
- Henry IV, Part 1 (2002) by William Shakespeare – Lady Mortimer
- Agamemnon (2003) by Aeschylus – Cassandra
- The Swanne: Princess Charlotte (The Acts of Venus) (2003) by Peter Hinton-Davis – Dot
- Noises Off (2004) by Michael Frayn – Brooke Ashton
- Henry VIII (2004) by William Shakespeare – Anne Bullen
- As You Like It (2005) by William Shakespeare – Rosalind
- The Glass Menagerie (2006) by Tennessee Williams – Laura
- The Merchant of Venice (2006) by William Shakespeare – Jessica
- London Assurance (2006) by Dion Boucicault – Grace
- King Lear (2007) by William Shakespeare – Cordelia
- An Ideal Husband (2007) by Oscar Wilde – Mabel
- Fuente Ovejuna (2008) by Lope de Vega – Laurencia
- The Importance of Being Earnest (2009) by Oscar Wilde – Gwendolen
- Peter Pan (2010) by J. M. Barrie – Wendy
- Dangerous Liaisons (2010) by Christopher Hampton – Présidente de Tourvel
- Twelfth Night (2011) by William Shakespeare – Olivia
- The Misanthrope (2011) by Molière – Célimène
- Blithe Spirit (2013) by Noël Coward – Ruth
- Romeo and Juliet (2013) by William Shakespeare – Juliet

== Broadway theatre credits ==
- The Importance of Being Earnest (2010–2011) by Oscar Wilde, American Airlines Theatre, 13 January 2011 – 26 June 2011, Gwendolen
- Thérèse Raquin (2015) adaptation by Helen Edmundson, Roundabout Theater at Studio 54, October–November 2015, minor roles and understudy Thérèse Raquin
- Travesties (2018) by Tom Stoppard, American Airlines Theatre, April–June 2018, Cecily
- Leopoldstadt (2022–2023) by Tom Stoppard, Longacre Theatre, October 2022 – July 2023, Jana, Sally, and understudies

== Roles in other companies ==
Topham played Titania and Hippolyta in A Midsummer Night's Dream by Shakespeare at the Shakespeare Theatre Company (2012), Cecily in Travesties by Tom Stoppard at the McCarter Theatre (2012), Miranda in The Tempest by Shakespeare at the Hartford Stage (2012), Gwendolyn in The Importance of Being Earnest at the Roundabout Theatre Company on Broadway (2012), the Governess in The Turn of the Screw by Jeffrey Hatcher adapted from Henry James at the Belfry Theatre (2008), Constanze in Amadeus by Peter Shaffer at Theatre Aquarius, and Mary Hatch in It's a Wonderful Life adapted for the stage at The Grand Theatre in London, Ontario, Canada.

== Movies ==
In addition to film adaptations of Twelfth Night (2012) and The Importance of Being Earnest (2011), Topham played Rachel Peabody in Disney's Eloise at Christmastime (2003) and Anna in Dying to Dance (2001).
