= London Suite (play) =

Play written by Neil Simon

London Suite is a play by Neil Simon, consisting of four one-act plays. London Suite also was a 1996 television movie. It is in a similar style to Simon's earlier works Plaza Suite and California Suite.

== Productions ==
London Suite premiered at the Seattle Repertory Theatre, running from October 12, 1994 through November 5. Directed by Daniel Sullivan, the cast featured Jeffrey Jones, Carole Shelley, Amy Ryan, Paxton Whitehead, Barbara Dirickson, Sean G. Griffin and Rex McDowell. The plays are "Going Home", "Settling Accounts", "Diana and Sidney" (which involve two characters from California Suite), and "The Man on the Floor".

London Suite opened Off-Broadway at the Union Square Theatre on March 28, 1995 and closed on September 3, 1995 after 169 performances. Directed by Daniel Sullivan, with lighting design by Ken Billington, the cast featured Carole Shelley (Mrs. Semple, Diana and Mrs. Sitgood), Paxton Whitehead (Billy, Sidney and Dr. McMerlin), Kate Burton (Lauren, Grace and Annie), Jeffrey Jones (Brian and Mark) and Brooks Ashmanskas (Bellman). The production was nominated for the Outer Critics Circle Awardas Outstanding Off-Broadway Play.

== Plot ==
The action takes place in a London hotel overlooking Hyde Park in a series of four plays:

- Settling Accounts

Brian Cronin and Billy Fox. Brian is a successful Welsh novelist; Billy is his manager, whom Brian has caught in the process of running off with all his money. In the film, this pair was changed to Debra and Paul Dolby, a newlywed couple from New York City who are on their honeymoon. Paul has disappeared after the couple had an argument on the plane, and now Debra is caught in a chain of increasingly ridiculous lies when she runs into his relatives at the hotel who are holding a welcoming party for the two of them.

- Going Home

Sharon and Lauren Semple. A mother and daughter on a shopping trip. Lauren convinces her mother to go on a date with an elderly man they had just met, even though Sharon is heavily against it. While at dinner with the man, she is puzzled by his rather eccentric mannerisms.

- Diana and Sidney

Sidney and Diana Nichols. A divorced couple: she is an actress, and he is living with his male lover. Now he claims he needs money from her to help pay the medical bills for his partner who is dying from lung cancer. The pair are based on characters from California Suite, played in the 1978 film by Michael Caine and Maggie Smith.

- The Man on the Floor

Mark and Anne Ferris. An American couple who are in London to see the Wimbledon Championships. Their plans are put on hold, however, when Anne loses the tickets, Mark's back gives out, leaving him immobile and in pain on the hotel floor, and they are asked to move because they have accidentally been given Kevin Costner's suite.

With the exception of Sidney and Diana's storyline (and Brian and Billy's in the play), the plots are largely comedic.

== Film ==
The film, a Hallmark Entertainment production, was televised on September 15, 1996. The film was directed by Jay Sandrich with the screenplay by Simon, and starred:

- Kelsey Grammer - Sidney Nichols
- Patricia Clarkson - Diana Nichols
- Julia Louis-Dreyfus - Debra Dolby
- Jonathan Silverman - Paul Dolby
- Madeline Kahn - Sharon Semple
- Margot Steinberg - Lauren Semple
- Michael Richards - Mark Ferris
- Julie Hagerty - Anne Ferris
- Richard Mulligan - Dennis Cummings, Sharon's date.
- Kristen Johnston - Grace Chapman, Diana's assistant.
- Jane Carr - Mrs. Sitgood, the concierge.
- Paxton Whitehead - Dr. McMerlin, the back doctor ("a magician with backs!")
- William Franklyn - Widely, the hotel supervisor
