= Barbara Lang (Broadway actress) =

American actress (born 1937)

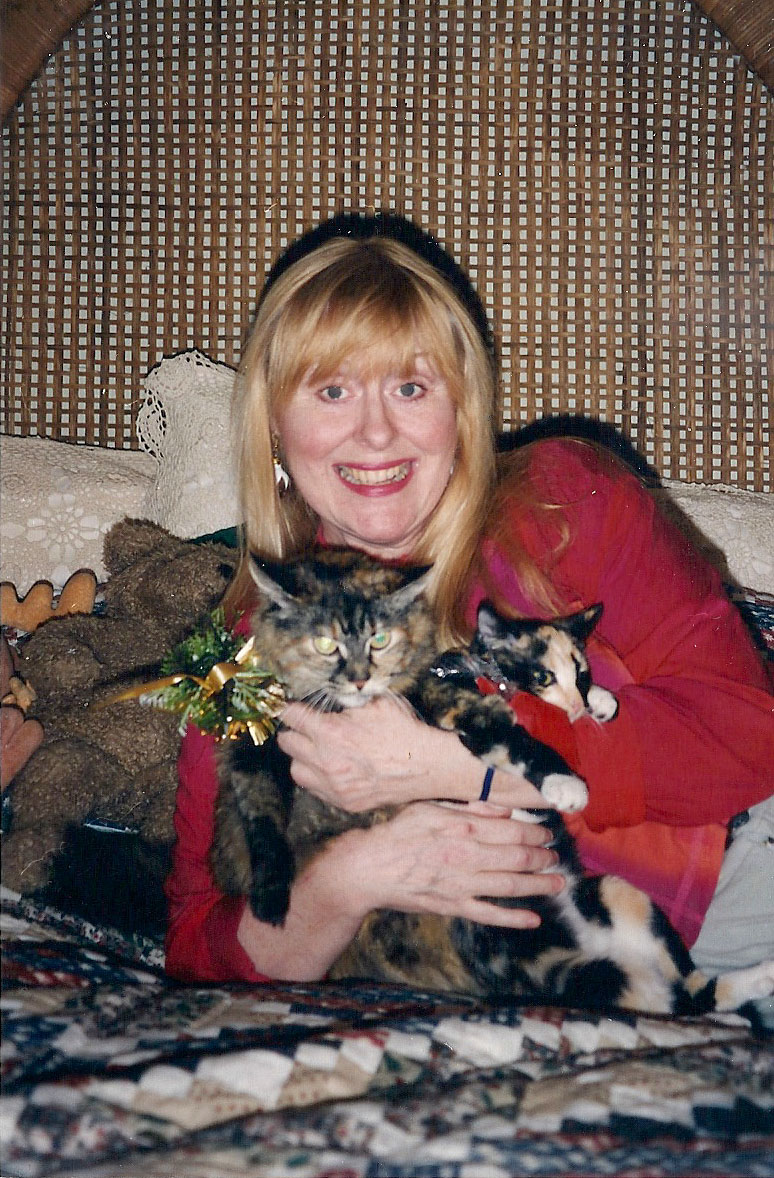
- Born: Barbara May Nedlo; April 8, 1937 (age 88); Chicago, Illinois
- Notable work: Madame Giry in Phantom of the Opera, First National Tour, the Christine Company, Cameron Mackintosh

Barbara Lang (born April 8, 1937) is an American actress who has been featured in many Broadway productions of the 1960s and 1970s.

== Discography ==
She featured in the Anything Goes 1962 Broadway Revival Cast and soundtrack album. as well as the 1973 A Little Night Music- Original Broadway Cast Recording 1973.
