= The Last Night of Ballyhoo =

Play written by Alfred Uhry

- Original language: English
- Written by: Alfred Uhry
- Characters: Sunny Freitag; Adolph Freitag; Lala Levy; Boo Levy; Peachy Weil; Joe Farkas; Reba Freitag
- Genre: Comedy/Drama
- Setting: Atlanta, Georgia; December 1939

Premiere
- Date: July 20, 1996
- Place: Olympic Arts Festival; Atlanta, Georgia

The Last Night of Ballyhoo is a play by Alfred Uhry that premiered in 1996 in Atlanta. The play is a comedy/drama, which is set in Atlanta, Georgia, in December 1939.

== Plot ==
The play is set in the upper class German-Jewish community living in Atlanta, Georgia in December 1939. Hitler has recently conquered Poland, Gone with the Wind is about to premiere, and Adolph Freitag (owner of the Dixie Bedding Company), his sister Boo, and sister-in-law Reba, along with nieces Lala and Sunny – a Jewish family so highly assimilated they have a Christmas tree in the front parlor – are looking forward to Ballyhoo, a lavish cotillion ball sponsored by their restrictive country club. Adolph's employee Joe Farkas is an attractive eligible bachelor and an Eastern European Jew, familiar with prejudice but unable to fathom its existence within his own religious community. His presence prompts college student Sunny to examine intra-ethnic bias, her Jewish identity (or lack thereof), and the beliefs with which she has been raised.

== Characters ==
Boo Levy – Lala's mother, Sunny's aunt, and Adolph's sister. Her husband is dead, and she struggles with wanting her daughter to be socially successful. Boo is the main character driving the play's inter-Jewish racism. Described in cast of characters as 'Adolf's sister, a few years older.'

Sunny Freitag – A junior at a well-to-do liberal arts college (Wellesley College), Sunny is interested in the works of Eugene V. Debs and Upton Sinclair. She struggles with her Jewish identity, but faces this through her relationship with Joe. It is unknown whether the end scene is a dream or a reality. Described in cast of characters as 'Reba's daughter, 20s.'

Adolph Freitag – Adores Sunny, but has little tolerance for Lala. Adolph is a kind soul, who understands the good impact Joe has on the family. Described in cast of characters as 'a businessman, late 40s.'

Lala Levy – Obsessed with 'Gone With The Wind.' Somewhat childish and awkward, Lala finally finds a husband in Peachy. Lala fights with her mother over their Jewish identity and her social status. Described in cast of characters as 'Boo's daughter, 20s.'

Reba Freitag – Sister-in-law to Adolph and Boo. Reba is somewhat simple, but is more shrewd than others give her credit. Like the other characters, Reba is oblivious to what it means to be Jewish. Described in cast of characters as 'Adolf's sister-in-law, middle 40s.'

Joe Farkas – Works for Adolph Freitag, and finds an intellectual match in Sunny. Challenges the family to reassess their ideas of identity and family. Described in cast of characters as 'Adolf's business assistant, 20s.'

Peachy Weil – Finds a match in Lala. Known for his obnoxious behavior and outspokenness. Described in cast of characters as 'a visitor from Lake Charles, 20s.'

== Background ==
Originally a series of vignettes, each featuring a different member family of the city's exclusive Standard Club, Ballyhoo was inspired by the playwright's childhood memories. In revising the play, Uhry opted to focus solely on the Freitags and expanded their storyline into two acts. Ballyhoo was commissioned by the Olympic Arts Festival for the 1996 Summer Olympics and was staged at Atlanta's Alliance Theatre that year. The Atlanta cast included Terry Beaver as Adolph, Dana Ivey as Boo, Stephen Mailer as Joe, Jessalyn Gilsig as Sunny, Mary Bacon as Lala, Valerie Curtin as Aunt Reba, and Stephen Largay as Peachy Weil. Beaver, Ivey, and Largay were the only cast members to transfer to Broadway.

== Production ==
The play opened on Broadway at the Helen Hayes Theatre on February 27, 1997 and closed on June 28, 1998 after 556 performances. Directed by Ron Lagomarsino, the original cast included Terry Beaver as Adolph, Dana Ivey as Boo, Paul Rudd as Joe, Arija Bareikis as Sunny, Jessica Hecht as Lala, Celia Weston as Aunt Reba, and Stephen Largay as Peachy Weil.

Replacements later in the run included Peter Michael Goetz as Adolph, Kelly Bishop (in circa May 1998) and Carole Shelley (as of August 26, 1997) as Boo, Mark Feuerstein and Christopher Gartin as Joe, Kimberly Williams as Sunny (as of August 26, 1997), and Cynthia Nixon (as of August 26, 1997) and Ilana Levine as Lala.

== Critical reception ==
Ben Brantley of the New York Times observed, "Much of the gently barbed, idiosyncratic Southern humor recalls a vintage episode of the television sitcom Designing Women . . . Mr. Uhry's one previous play, Driving Miss Daisy . . . was a modest masterpiece of obliquely rendered sentimentality and social commentary. Here the author employs much more direct and conventional means that work more blatantly to elicit laughs and tears. Ballyhoo isn't a clumsy work; on its own terms, it's a model of old-fashioned tailoring. And Mr. Uhry has a fascinating and incendiary subject in the self-hatred implicit in the social stratifications among Southern Jews, particularly given that the play is set on the eve of World War II. But the context in which he couches it can feel very treacly . . . There's no doubting that Ballyhoo is a sincere, good-hearted work, but it almost never feels spontaneous. Despite its provocative subject, its form is the theatrical equivalent of comfort food, something for those who like their nostalgia repackaged in the guise of something new."

== Awards and nominations ==
- 1997 Tony Award for Best Play (winner)
- 1997 Tony Award, Best Featured Actor in a Play, Terry Beaver (nominee)
- 1997 Tony Award, Best Featured Actress in a Play, Dana Ivey (nominee)
- 1997 Tony Award, Best Featured Actress in a Play, Celia Weston (nominee)
- Outer Critics Circle Award for Best Broadway Play (winner)
- 1997 Drama Desk Award for Outstanding New Play (nominee)
- 1997 Drama Desk Award, Outstanding Featured Actress in a Play, Dana Ivey (winner)
- 1997 Drama Desk Award, Outstanding Featured Actress in a Play, Celia Weston (nominee)
- 1997 Pulitzer Prize for Drama – finalist
