= Alfred Uhry =

American playwright and screenwriter (born 1936)

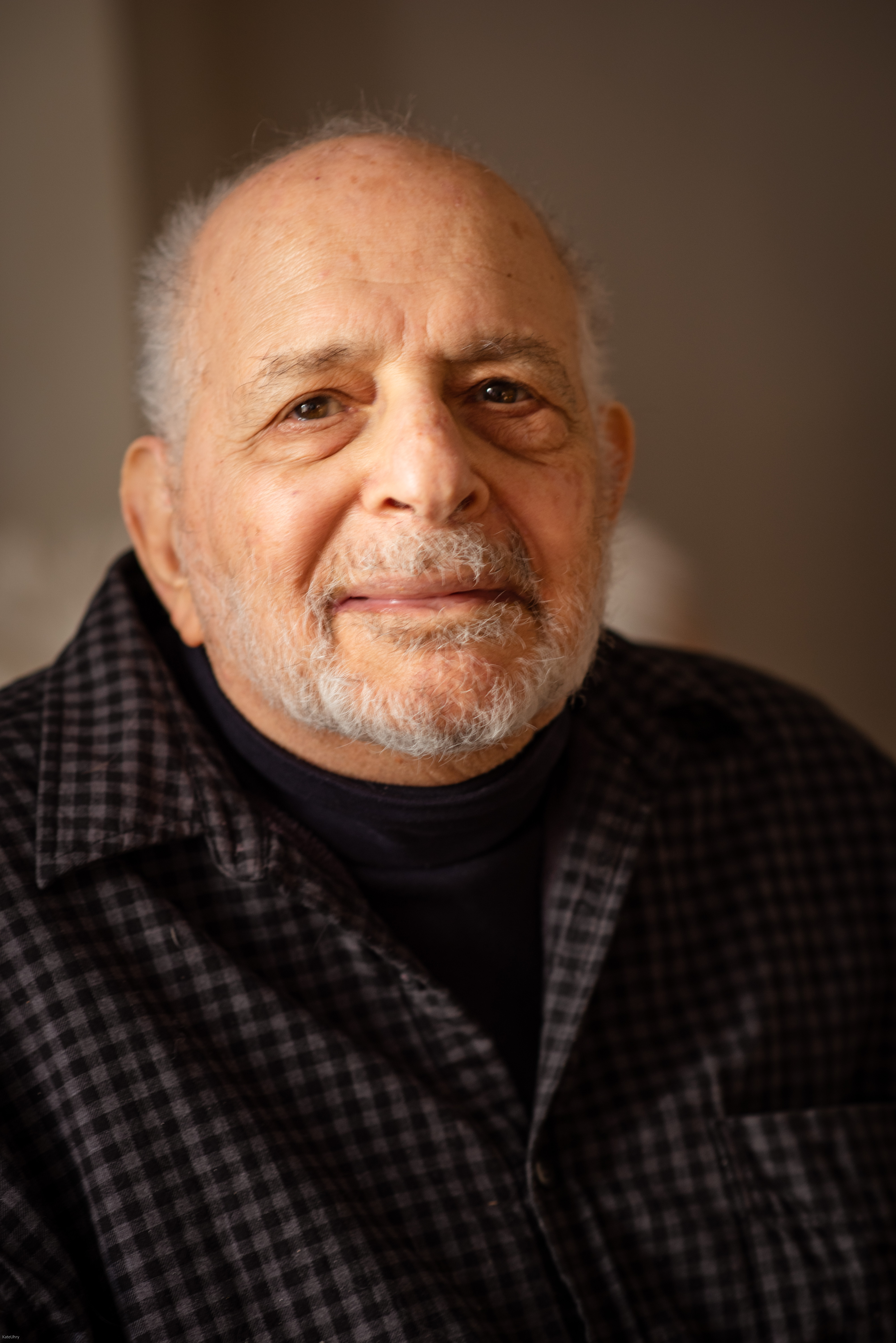
- Born: Alfred Fox Uhry; December 3, 1936 (age 89); Atlanta, Georgia, U.S.
- Education: Brown University (BA)
- Spouse: Joanna Kellogg
- Writing career
- Notable awards: Pulitzer Prize for Drama (1988)

Alfred Fox Uhry (born December 3, 1936) is an American playwright and screenwriter. He is the recipient of two Tony Awards and the Pulitzer Prize for Drama for Driving Miss Daisy, as well as the Academy Award for the 1989 film adaptation of the play. He is a member of the Fellowship of Southern Writers.

== Early life ==
Uhry was born in Atlanta, Georgia, the son of Alene (Fox), a social worker, and Ralph K. Uhry, a furniture designer and artist. He was born into a German Jewish family with one sister, the author Ann Uhry Abrams. Uhry graduated from Druid Hills High School in 1954 and went on to graduate from Brown University in 1958 where he wrote two original musicals with Brownbrokers. Druid Hills High School's Uhry Theater is named in honor of Uhry. During his first years in New York City, learning the craft of lyric-writing, Uhry received a stipend from Frank Loesser; after his eventual success, Uhry often praised Loesser's generosity and encouragement.

== Career ==
Uhry's early work for the stage was as a lyricist and librettist for a number of commercially unsuccessful musicals, including a revival of Little Johnny Jones starring Donny Osmond (1982) which ran for one performance on Broadway.

His first collaboration with Robert Waldman was the 1968 musical Here's Where I Belong, which closed after one performance (and 20 previews) on Broadway. They had considerably better success with The Robber Bridegroom, which premiered on Broadway in both 1975 and 1976, had a year-long national tour, and garnered Uhry his first Tony Award nomination, for best book of a musical in 1976.

America's Sweetheart, with music by Robert Waldman and with the book co-written by Uhry with John Weidman, ran at the Hartford Stage, Hartford, Connecticut in March 1985 to April 1985, and then at the Coconut Grove Playhouse, Miami, Florida, where it closed.

The Robber Bridegroom was revived Off-Broadway in March 2016 at the Roundabout Theatre Company and directed by Alex Timbers. This production won three Lucille Lortel Awards including Outstanding Revival.

=== Atlanta Trilogy ===
Driving Miss Daisy (1987) is the first in what is known as his "Atlanta Trilogy" of plays, all set during the first half of the 20th century. Produced Off-Broadway at Playwrights Horizons, the play earned him the 1988 Pulitzer Prize for Drama. It deals with the relationship between an elderly Jewish woman and her black chauffeur. The character “Daisy” was based on the friendship between Uhry's grandmother and her driver. He adapted it into the screenplay for a 1989 film starring Jessica Tandy and Morgan Freeman, an adaptation which was awarded the Academy Award for Writing Adapted Screenplay, in addition to the Academy Award to Tandy for best actress.

The second of the trilogy, The Last Night of Ballyhoo (1996), is set in 1939 during the premiere of the film Gone with the Wind. It deals with a Jewish family during an important social event. It was commissioned for the Cultural Olympiad in Atlanta which coincided with the 1996 Summer Olympics, and received the Tony Award for Best Play when produced on Broadway in 1997.

The third is the 1998 musical Parade, about the 1913 trial of Jewish factory manager Leo Frank. The libretto earned him a Tony Award for Best Book of a Musical. The music was written by Jason Robert Brown.

=== Additional theatre ===
Uhry's play Edgardo Mine is based on the true story of Edgardo Mortara, an Italian child taken by police from his Jewish family in 1858 because one of their domestic servants had baptized him. The play, directed by Doug Hughes, opened at Hartford Stage, Hartford, Connecticut in November 2002.

The Manhattan Theatre Club produced Uhry's musical LoveMusik on Broadway in 2007. The story depicts the relationship between composer Kurt Weill and his wife, Lotte Lenya, using Weill's music.

Apples & Oranges premiered on October 10, 2012, at the Alliance Theatre in Atlanta. This new play is about the rediscovery of a sibling relationship.

Angel Reapers, a collaboration with director/choreographer Martha Clarke, ran Off-Broadway at the Signature Theatre from February 2 to March 20, 2016. This production won the Lucille Lortel Award for "Outstanding Alternative Theatrical Experience".

=== Film ===
Uhry wrote the screenplay for the 1989 film version of Driving Miss Daisy and for the 1992 film Rich in Love; he co-wrote the screenplay for the 1988 film Mystic Pizza.

== Personal life ==
Uhry was married to Joanna Kellogg, Ed.D., from 1959 until her death on August 26, 2019, at age 82 from complications of Parkinson's disease and Lewy Body Dementia. Dr. Kellogg Uhry was a professor at Fordham University. They had four daughters and lived in New York City.
