= List of productions at the Mark Taper Forum =

The following is a list of productions at the Mark Taper Forum in Los Angeles, California.

== 1960s ==
=== 1967 (Premiere Season) ===
- The Devils by John Whiting (West Coast Premiere); Director by Gordon Davidson
- The Sorrows of Frederick by Romulus Linney (World Premiere); Directed by Albert Marre
- The Marriage of Mr. Mississippi by Friederich Dürrenmatt (West Coast Premiere); Directed by Malcolm Black
- Who's Happy Now by Oliver Hailey (World Premiere); Directed by Gordon Davidson
- Muzeeka by John Guare (World Premiere); Directed by Edward Parone.

=== 1968 ===
- The Miser by Molière; Directed by Douglas Campbell.
- In the Matter of J. Robert Oppenheimer by Heinar Kipphardt (American Premiere); Directed by Gordon Davidson
- Camino Real by Tennessee Williams; Directed by Milton Katselas
- The Golden Fleece by A. R. Gurney, Jr. (World Premiere); Directed by Jered Barclay

=== 1969 ===
- The House of Atreus by Aeschylus; Directed by Tyrone Guthrie

in repertory with:

- The Resistible Rise of Arturo Ui by Bertolt Brecht; Directed by Edward Payson Call
- The Adventures of the Black Girl in Her Search For God by Bernard Shaw (World Premiere); Adapted for the stage by Christopher Isherwood; Directed by Lamont Johnson
- Chemin de Fer by Georges Feydeau (American Premiere); Directed by Stephen Porter
- Uncle Vanya by Anton Chekhov; Directed by Harold Clurman

== 1970s ==
=== 1970 ===
- Murderous Angels by Conor Cruise O'Brien (World Premiere); Directed by Gordon Davidson
- Crystal & Fox by Brian Friel (American Premiere); Directed by Hilton Edwards
- Paul Sills' Story Theatre devised and directed by Paul Sills
- The Dream on Monkey Mountain (World Premiere) by Derek Walcott; Directed by Michael A. Schultz
- Rosebloom (World Premiere) by Harvey Perr; Directed by Gordon Davidson

=== 1971 ===
- Metamorphoses (World Premiere) by Ovid, adapted by Paul Sills and Arnold Weinstein; Directed by Paul Sills
- Othello by William Shakespeare; Directed by John Berry
- The Trial of the Catonsville Nine (World Premiere) by Daniel Berrigan, S.J.; Directed by Gordon Davidson
- Major Barbara by Bernard Shaw; Directed by Edward Parone
- Godspell (West Coast Premiere) by John-Michael Tebelak and Stephen Schwartz; Directed by John-Michael Tebelak

Note that James Whitmore in Will Rogers' U.S.A. was recorded at the Mark Taper Forum on January 15 & 16, 1971

=== 1972 ===
- McKenna/MacGowran (Here Are Ladies by Joyce, Shaw, O'Casey, Yeats, Synge, Stephens, Beckett, etc.; Directed by Sean Kenny and The Works of Beckett by Samuel Beckett; Directed by Jack MacGowran)
- Volpone by Ben Jonson; Directed by Edward Parone.
- Old Times (West Coast Premiere) by Harold Pinter; Directed by Jeff Bleckner
- Don't Bother Me, I Can't Cope (West Coast Premiere) by Micki Grant; Conceived and directed by Vinnette Carroll.
- Henry IV, Part I by William Shakespeare; Directed by Gordon Davidson

=== 1973 ===
- Mass (West Coast Premiere) by Leonard Bernstein; Directed by Gordon Davidson.
- The Mind with the Dirty Man (World Premiere) by Jules Tasca; Directed by Edward Parone.
- Forget-Me-Not Lane (West Coast Premiere) by Peter Nichols; Directed by Arvin Brown.
- The Hot l Baltimore (West Coast Premiere) by Lanford Wilson; Directed by Marshall W. Mason.
- Brecht: Sacred & Profane (West Coast Premiere) (The Mahagonny Songplay by Bertolt Brecht, music by Kurt Weill, and The Measures Taken by Bertolt Brecht Music by Hanns Eisler); Directed by Edward Payson Call

=== 1974/1975 ===
- Hamlet by William Shakespeare; Directed by Gordon Davidson
- The Charlatan (World Premiere) by Derek Walcott; Music by Galt MacDermot; Directed by Mel Shapiro
- Savages (American Premiere) by Christopher Hampton; Directed by Gordon Davidson
- Juno and the Paycock by Seán O'Casey; Directed by George Seaton

=== 1975 Special Spring Celebration ===
- Me and Bessie (World Premiere) Book by Will Holt; Concept by Linda Hopkins; Directed by Robert Greenwald
- Sizwe Banzi is Dead and The Island (West Coast Premiere) by Athol Fugard, Winston Ntshona and John Kani; Directed by Athol Fugard

=== 1975/1976 ===
- Once in a Lifetime by George S. Kaufman and Moss Hart; Directed by Edward Parone
- Too Much Johnson (World Premiere) by William Gillette; Directed by Gordon Davidson

in repertory with:

- The Shadow Box by Michael Cristofer; Directed by Gordon Davidson
- The Duchess of Malfi (West Coast Premiere) by John Webster; Directed by Howard Sackler

Four Plays in Repertory:

- Ashes (American Premiere) by David Rudkin; Directed by Edward Parone
- Cross Country (World Premiere) by Susan Miller; Directed by Vickie Rue
- And Where She Stops Nobody Knows (World Premiere) by Oliver Hailey; Directed by Gordon Davidson.
- Three Sisters by Anton Chekhov; Directed by Edward Parone

=== 1976/1977 ===
- The Robber Bridegroom (West Coast Premiere) Book and lyrics by Alfred Uhry; Music by Robert Waldman; Directed by Gerald Freedman
- Ice (World Premiere) by Michael Cristofer; Directed by Jeff Bleckner
- Vanities (West Coast Premiere) by Jack Heifner; Directed by Garland Wright
- Travesties (West Coast Premiere) by Tom Stoppard; Directed by Edward Parone

in repertory with:

- The Importance of Being Earnest by Oscar Wilde; Directed by Edward Parone.

=== 10th Anniversary Repertory Festival ===
- A History of the American Film (West Coast Premiere) by Christopher Durang; Directed by Peter Mark Schifter.
- Angel City by Sam Shepard; Directed by Robert Calhoun
- Leander Stillwell (World Premiere) by David Rush; Directed by John Dennis.
- Bugs/Guns by Doris Baizley; Music by Harry Aguado; Directed by John Dennis

=== 1977/1978 ===
- for colored girls who have considered suicide/when the rainbow is enuf (West Coast Premiere) by Ntozake Shangé; Directed by Oz Scott
- Comedians (West Coast Premiere) by Trevor Griffiths; Directed by Edward Parone.
- Getting Out (West Coast Premiere) by Marsha Norman; Directed by Gordon Davidson
- Black Angel by Michael Cristofer; Directed by Gordon Davidson

=== 1978/1979 ===
- Zoot Suit (World Premiere) by Luis Valdez; Directed by Luis Valdez
- Dusa, Fish, Stas & Vi (American Premiere) by Pam Gems; Directed by Edward Parone
- Terra Nova (West Coast Premiere) by Ted Tally; Directed by Gordon Davidson
- The Tempest by William Shakespeare; Directed by John Hirsch

=== 1979/1980 ===
- Talley's Folly (West Coast Premiere) by Lanford Wilson; Directed by Marshall W. Mason; in repertory with
- 5th of July by Lanford Wilson; Directed by Marshall W. Mason
- Children of a Lesser God (World Premiere) by Mark Medoff; Directed by Gordon Davidson
- I Ought To Be In Pictures (World Premiere) by Neil Simon; Directed by Herbert Ross
- Says I, Says He (West Coast Premiere) by Ron Hutchinson; Directed by Steven Robman
- Division Street (World Premiere) by Steve Tesich; Directed by Tom Moore

== 1980s ==
=== 1980/1981 ===
- The Lady and the Clarinet (World Premiere) by Michael Cristofer; Directed by Gordon Davidson
- Billy Bishop Goes To War (West Coast Premiere) by John Gray in collaboration with Eric Peterson; Directed by John Gray
- Hoagy, Bix and Wolfgang Beethoven Bunkhaus (American Premiere) by Adrian Mitchell; Directed by Steven Robman
- Tintypes (West Coast Premiere) by Mary Kyte with Mel Marvin and Gary Pearle; Directed by Gary Pearle
- Chekhov in Yalta (World Premiere) by John Driver and Jeffrey Haddow; Directed Ellis Rabb and Gordon Davidson

in repertory with:

- Twelfth Night by William Shakespeare; Directed by Ellis Rabb and Diana Maddox

=== 1981/1982 ===
- A Lesson From Aloes (West Coast Premiere) by Athol Fugard; Directed by Daniel Petrie.
- A Tale Told (West Coast Premiere) by Lanford Wilson; Directed by Marshall W. Mason
- Number Our Days (World Premiere) by Suzanne Grossmann; Based on the book by Barbara Myerhoff; Conceived and directed by John Hirsch
- Tales From Hollywood (World Premiere) by Christopher Hampton; Directed by Gordon Davidson
- A Flea in Her Ear by Georges Feydeau A new adaptation by Suzanne Grossmann and Paxton Whitehead; Directed by Tom Moore in repertory with
- The Misanthrope by Molière; English verse translation by Richard Wilbur; Directed by Diana Maddox

=== 1982/1983 ===
- A Soldier's Play (West Coast Premiere) by Charles Fuller; Directed by Douglas Turner Ward
- Metamorphosis (American Premiere) by Franz Kafka; Adapted and directed by Steven Berkoff
- Accidental Death of an Anarchist (West Coast Premiere) by Dario Fo; Adapted by John Lahr; Directed by Mel Shapiro
- Grown Ups (West Coast Premiere) by Jules Feiffer; Directed by John Madden
- A Month in the Country by Ivan Turgenev; Adapted by Willis Bell; Directed by Tom Moore; in repertory with
- Richard III by William Shakespeare; Directed by Diana Maddox

=== 1983/1984 ===
- Cat on a Hot Tin Roof by Tennessee Williams; Directed by José Quintero
- An American Comedy (World Premiere) by Richard Nelson; Directed by John Madden
- Quilters (West Coast Premiere) by Molly Newman and Barbara Damashek; Music, lyrics and entire production directed by Barbara Damashek.
- The Genius (American Premiere) by Howard Brenton; Directed by Ben Levit

Three plays in repertory:

- The American Clock: A Mural for the Theatre (West Coast Premiere) a new version by Arthur Miller; Directed by Gordon Davidson
- Wild Oats: A Romance of the Old West (World Premiere) newly adapted from John O'Keeffe's play by James McLure; Directed by Tom Moore
- Moby Dick—Rehearsed by Orson Welles; Directed by Edward Payson Call

=== 1984/1985 ===
- Viva Vittorio! (American Premiere) conceived and directed by Vittorio Gassman
- The Hands of Its Enemy (World Premiere) by Mark Medoff; Directed by Gordon Davidson
- Passion Play (West Coast Premiere) by Peter Nichols; Directed by Gwen Arner
- Traveler in the Dark (West Coast Premiere) by Marsha Norman; Directed by Gordon Davidson
- In the Belly of the Beast by Jack Henry Abbott; Adapted by Adrian Hall; Further adapted by Robert Woodruff; Directed by Robert Woodruff
- Undiscovered Country (West Coast Premiere) by Arthur Schnitzler in a version by Tom Stoppard; Directed by Ken Ruta in repertory with
- Measure for Measure by William Shakespeare; Directed by Robert Egan

=== 1985/1986 ===
- The Beautiful Lady (West Coast Premiere) by Elizabeth Swados and Paul Schmidt; Music, lyrics and direction by Elizabeth Swados.
- Romance Language (West Coast Premiere) by Peter Parnell; Directed by Sheldon Larry
- 'night, Mother by Marsha Norman; Directed by Tom Moore

Three plays in repertory:

- Green Card (World Premiere) written and directed by JoAnne Akalaitis
- The Real Thing by Tom Stoppard; Directed by Gordon Davidson
- Hedda Gabler by Henrik Ibsen in a version by Christopher Hampton; Directed by Robert Egan

=== 1986/1987 ===
- Asinamali! (Special Event) written and directed by Mbongeni Ngema
- The Immigrant—A Hamilton County Album (West Coast Premiere) by Mark Harelik; Directed by Randal Myler
- Ghetto (English Language Premiere) by Joshua Sobol; Directed by Gordon Davidson
- Burn This (World Premiere) by Lanford Wilson; Directed by Marshall W. Mason
- The Traveler (World Premiere) by Jean-Claude van Itallie; Directed by Steven Kent
- Roza (West Coast Premiere) book and lyrics by Julian More; Music by Gilbert Becaud; based on La Vie Devant Soi by Romain Gary; Directed by Harold Prince
- Loot by Joe Orton; Directed by John Tillinger; in repertory with
- Entertaining Mr. Sloane by Joe Orton; Directed by John Tillinger

=== 1987/1988 ===
- Babbitt: a marriage (World Premiere) Based on the novel by Sinclair Lewis; Adapted by Ron Hutchinson; Music composed and adapted by Mel Marvin; Directed by Steven Robman.
- Hunting Cockroaches (West Coast Premiere) by Janusz Glowacki; Directed by Arthur Penn
- A Lie of the Mind by Sam Shepard; Directed by Robert Woodruff
- Made in Bangkok (American Premiere) by Anthony Minghella; Directed by Robert Egan
- The Colored Museum by George C. Wolfe; Directed by L. Kenneth Richardson
- Lost Highway: The Music and Legend of Hank Williams (West Coast Premiere) by Randal Myler and Mark Harelik; Directed by Randal Myler

=== 1988/1989 ===
- Nothing Sacred (United States Premiere) by George F. Walker Based on the novel Fathers Sons by Ivan Turgenev; Directed by Michael Lindsay-Hogg
- Frankie and Johnny in the Clair de Lune (West Coast Premiere) by Terrence McNally; Directed by Paul Benedict
- Dutch Landscape (World Premiere) by Jon Robin Baitz; Directed by Gordon Davidson
- Sansei (World Premiere) created by Hiroshima; Developed and directed by Robert Egan.
- Stand-Up Tragedy (World Premiere) by Bill Cain; Directed by Ron Link
- Temptation (West Coast Premiere) by Václav Havel; Directed by Richard Jordan

=== 1989/1990 ===
- Our Country's Good (American Premiere) by Timberlake Wertenbaker; Based on the novel The Playmaker by Thomas Keneally; Co-directed by Max Stafford-Clark and Les Waters
- Mystery of the Rose Bouquet (American Premiere) by Manuel Puig; Translated by Allan Baker; American adaptation by Jeremy Lawrence; Directed by Robert Allan Ackerman
- A Midsummer Night's Dream by William Shakespeare; Directed by Kenneth Branagh; in repertory with
- King Lear by William Shakespeare; Directed by Kenneth Branagh (The American debut of The

Renaissance Theatre Company's productions

- 50/60 Vision: Plays and Playwrights That Changed The Theatre (Thirteen Plays in Repertory); Conceived and produced by Edward Parone; Plays by Edward Albee, Amiri Baraka (LeRoi Jones), Samuel Beckett, Jean Genet, Eugène Ionesco, Harold Pinter and Sam Shepard; Directed by Michael Arabian, Peter C. Brosius, Daniel O'Connor, Carey Perloff and Ethan Silverman
- Aristocrats (West Coast Premiere) by Brian Friel; Directed by Robert Egan
- Miss Evers' Boys (West Coast Premiere) by David Feldshuh; Directed by Irene Lewis

== 1990s ==
=== 1990/1991 ===
- Hope of the Heart (World Premiere) by Adrian Hall; Adapted from the writings of Robert Penn Warren; Directed by Adrian Hall.
- The Dragon's Trilogy by Marie Brassard, Jean Casault, Lorraine Côté, Marie Gignac, Robert Lepage, Marie Michaud; directed by Robert Lepage (Special Event - Los Angeles Festival, Macgowan Hall, UCLA)
- The Lisbon Traviata (West Coast Premiere)by Terrence McNally; Directed by John Tillinger
- The Wash by Philip Kan Gotanda; Directed by Sharon Ott
- Jelly's Last Jam (World Premiere)book by George C. Wolfe, Music by Jelly Roll Morton, Musical Adaptation and Additional Composition by Luther Henderson, Lyrics by Susan Birkenhead; Directed by George C. Wolfe
- Julius Caesar by William Shakespeare; Directed by Oskar Eustis
- The Fever written and performed by Wallace Shawn at MOCA's Ahmanson Auditorium (Special Event) May 21-June 1, 1991
- Sex, Drugs, Rock & Roll written and performed by Eric Bogosian; Directed by Jo Bonney (Special Event)
- Widows (World Premiere) based on the novel by Ariel Dorfman; Adapted for the stage by Ariel Dorfman and Tony Kushner; Directed by Robert Egan
- Chola Con Cello: A Homegirl In The Philharmonic written and performed by María Elena Gaitán, the first staged version of a conceptual performance on immigrant human rights. Directed by Diane Rodriguez, produced by Josephine Ramirez. Performed as part of the Taper's OUT IN FRONT post Rodney King Riot performances.

=== 1991/1992 ===
- Spunk (West Coast Premiere) by Zora Neale Hurston; Adapted and directed by George C. Wolfe; Music by Chic Street Man
- Henceforward... (West Coast Premiere) by Alan Ayckbourn; Directed by Tom Moore
- The Kentucky Cycle by Robert Schenkkan; Directed by Warner Shook
- Richard II by William Shakespeare; Directed by Robert Egan
- Unfinished Stories (World Premiere) by Sybille Pearson; Directed by Gordon Davidson
- Fire in the Rain...Singer in the Storm written and performed by Holly Near; Conceived and developed by Timothy Near and Holly Near; Directed by Timothy Near

=== 1992/1993 ===
- Angels in America: A Gay Fantasia on National Themes, Part One – Millennium Approaches by Tony Kushner; Directed by Oskar Eustis with Tony Taccone
- Angels in America: A Gay Fantasia on National Themes, Part Two – Perestroika (World Premiere) by Tony Kushner; Directed by Oskar Eustis with Tony Taccone
- The Substance of Fire by Jon Robin Baitz; Directed by Daniel Sullivan.
- Scenes from an Execution (American Premiere) by Howard Barker; Directed by Robert Allan Ackerman
- Twilight: Los Angeles, 1992 On the Road: A Search for American Character (World Premiere) conceived, written and performed by Anna Deavere Smith; Directed by Emily Mann
- Lips Together, Teeth Apart by Terrence McNally; Directed by John Tillinger

=== 1993/1994 ===
Fall Festival:

- The Persians by Aeschylus; A Modern Version by Robert Auletta (American Premiere); Music composed and performed by Hamza El Din; Directed by Peter Sellars
- Pounding Nails in the Floor With My Forehead written and performed by Eric Bogosian; Directed by Jo Bonney
- Carpa Clash written and performed by Culture Clash—Richard Montoya, Ric Salinas and Herbert Siguenza; Directed by Jose Luis Valenzuela with
- Mimi's Monologue written and performed by Marga Gomez; Directed by Jose Luis Valenzuela

Subscription Season:

- Death and the Maiden by Ariel Dorfman; Directed by Robert Egan
- The Wood Demon by Anton Chekhov; in a world premiere translation by Nicholas Saunders and Frank Dwyer; Directed by Frank Dwyer
- Bandido! (World Premiere) by Luis Valdez; Music by Lalo Schifrin; Lyrics by Luis Valdez; Directed by Jose Luis Valenzuela
- The Waiting Room (World Premiere) by Lisa Loomer; Directed by David Schweizer

=== 1994/1995 ===
- Floating Islands, Part One - The Family Business: The Modern Ladies of Guanabacoa and In the Eye of the Hurricane (World Premiere) by Eduardo Machado; Directed by Oskar Eustis
- Floating Islands, Part Two - After the Revolution: Fabiola and Broken Eggs (World Premiere) by Eduardo Machado; Directed by Oskar Eustis
- Black Elk Speaks (West Coast Premiere) adapted by Christopher Sergel. Based on the book by John G. Neihardt; Directed by Donovan Marley
- Three Hotels by Jon Robin Baitz; Directed by Joe Mantello
- Master Class (West Coast Premiere) by Terrence McNally; Directed by Leonard Foglia
- Hysteria (American Premiere) by Terry Johnson; Directed by Phyllida Lloyd

=== 1995/1996 ===
- Slavs! (West Coast Premiere Production) by Tony Kushner; Directed by Michael Greif
- The Family Business (West Coast Premiere) written, directed and choreographed by Ain Gordon and David Gordon
- Edward Albee's Three Tall Women; Directed by Lawrence Sacharow
- Blade to the Heat (West Coast Premiere) by Oliver Mayer; Directed by Ron Link
- Psychopathia Sexualis by John Patrick Shanley; Directed by Daniel Sullivan
- Changes of Heart by Pierre Carlet de Chamblain de Marivaux; Translated, adapted and directed by Stephen Wadsworth

=== 1996/1997 ===
- Having Our Say by Emily Mann; Adapted from the book by Sarah L. Delany and A. Elizabeth Delany with Amy Hill Hearth; Directed by Walter Dallas
- Molly Sweeney by Brian Friel; Directed by Gwen Arner
- Arcadia by Tom Stoppard; Directed by Robert Egan
- Valley Song written and directed by Athol Fugard

New Theatre For Now on the Mainstage, A 30th Anniversary Festival:

- Demonology (West Coast Premiere) by Kelly Stuart; Directed by David Schweizer
- The Joy of Going Somewhere Definite (West Coast Premiere)by Quincy Long; Directed by David Schweizer
- The Street of the Sun (World Premiere) by José Rivera; Directed by David Esbjornson
- Mules (American Premiere) by Winsome Pinnock; Directed by Lisa Peterson
- Nine Armenians by Leslie Ayvazian; Directed by Gordon Davidson

=== 1997/1998 ===
- Skylight (West Coast Premiere) by David Hare; Directed by Robert Egan
- Room Service by John Murray and Allen Boretz; Adapted and performed by The Flying Karamazov Brothers with Paul Magid and Robert Woodruff; Directed by Robert Woodruff
- Neat written and performed by Charlayne Woodard; Directed by Daniel Sullivan
- Gross Indecency: The Three Trials of Oscar Wilde written and directed by Moisés Kaufman
- Dealer's Choice (West Coast Premiere) by Patrick Marber; Directed by Robert Egan
- The Cider House Rules: A new play in two parts Adapted by Peter Parnell from the

novel by John Irving; Conceived and directed by Tom Hulce and Jane Jones

=== 1998-1999 ===
- Putting It Together: A Musical Review Music and Lyrics by Stephen Sondheim; Directed by Eric D. Shaeffer; Musical Staging by Bob Avian; Presented in association with Cameron Mackintosh; Starring John Barrowman, Carol Burnett, Susan Egan, John McCook and Bronson Pinchot
- Tongue of a Bird by Ellen McLaughlin; Directed by Lisa Peterson; A co-production with Joseph Papp's Public Theater; Starring Cherry Jones, Ashley Johnson, Marian Seldes, Sharon Lawrence and Diane Venora
- How I Learned to Drive by Paula Vogel; Directed by Mark Brokaw; Starring Molly Ringwald and Brian Kerwin
- House Arrest: An Introgression (Special Event) A work in progress written and directed by Anna Deavere Smith
- Enigma Variations (American Premiere) by Eric-Emmanuel Schmitt; Translated by Roeg Jacob; Directed by Daniel Roussel
- Hughie by Eugene O'Neill; Directed by Al Pacino; Starring Al Pacino and Paul Benedict
- The First Picture Show (World Premiere Production) by Ain Gordon and David Gordon; Music by Jeanine Tesori; Directed by David Gordon; Presented in association with American Conservatory Theater.

=== 1999/2000 ===
- Space (West Coast Premiere) written and directed by Tina Landau
- Neil Simon's The Dinner Party (World Premiere); Directed by John Rando
- August Wilson's Jitney (West Coast Premiere) Directed by Marion McClinton
- Metamorphoses A new play based on the myths of Ovid; Written and directed by Mary Zimmerman
- The Poison Tree (World Premiere) by Robert Glaudini; Directed by Robert Egan
- Expecting Isabel (West Coast Premiere) by Lisa Loomer; Directed by Douglas C. Wager

== 2000s ==
=== 2000/2001 ===
- August Wilson's King Hedley II Directed by Marion McClinton.
- Closer by Patrick Marber; Directed by Robert Egan
- Glimmer, Glimmer and Shine (West Coast Premiere) by Warren Leight; Directed by Evan Yionoulis.
- QED (World Premiere) A New Play by Peter Parnell; Inspired by writings of Richard Feynman and Ralph Leighton's Tuva or Bust!; Directed by Gordon Davidson
- The Body of Bourne (World Premiere) by John Belluso; Directed by Lisa Peterson.
- In Real Life (World Premiere Production) written and performed by Charlayne Woodard; Directed by Daniel Sullivan.

in repertory with:

- Another American: Asking and Telling written and performed by Marc Wolf; Directed by Joe Mantello

=== 2001/2002 ===
- Flower Drum Song Music by Richard Rodgers; Lyrics by Oscar Hammerstein II; Book by David Henry Hwang; Based on the original by Oscar Hammerstein II and Joseph Fields; Based on the novel by C.Y. Lee; Directed and Choreographed by Robert Longbottom (World Premiere of the Musical's New Book)
- Copenhagen (West Coast Premiere) by Michael Frayn; Directed by Michael Blakemore; By arrangement with Michael Codron, Lee Dean and The Royal National Theatre
- My Old Lady (West Coast Premiere) by Israel Horovitz; Directed by David Esbjornson; Presented by CTG/Mark Taper Forum at the James A. Doolittle Theatre; part of Taper subscription series
- The Molière Comedies: The School for Husbands and The Imaginary Cuckold by Molière; Translated by Richard Wilbur; Directed by Brian Bedford
- Sorrows and Rejoicings (West Coast Premiere) Written and directed by Athol Fugard
- The House of Bernarda Alba (West Coast Premiere) by Federico García Lorca; In a new adaptation by Chay Yew; Directed by Lisa Peterson

=== 2002/2003 ===
- Nickel and Dimed (World Premiere Production) by Joan Holden; Based on the book by Barbara Ehrenreich; Directed by Bartlett Sher
- Big River Music and Lyrics by Roger Miller; Book by William Hauptman; Adapted from the novel by Mark Twain; Directed and Choreographed by Jeff Calhoun
- Living Out (World Premiere) by Lisa Loomer; Directed by Bill Rauch
- Ten Unknowns (West Coast Premiere) by Jon Robin Baitz; Directed by Robert Egan
- Slanguage (West Coast Premiere) by UNIVERSES; directed by Jo Bonney
- Chavez Ravine (World Premiere) Written and performed by Culture Clash; Directed by Lisa Peterson
- August Wilson's Gem of the Ocean (World Premiere Production); Directed by Marion McClinton

=== 2003/2004 ===
- Homebody/Kabul by Tony Kushner; Directed by Frank Galati; Presented in association with Steppenwolf Theatre Company
- Like Jazz (World Premiere) Music by Cy Coleman; Lyrics by Alan & Marilyn Bergman; Written by Larry Gelbart; Musical Staging and Choreography by Patricia Birch; Directed by Gordon Davidson; Presented in association with Transamerica
- Topdog/Underdog by Suzan-Lori Parks; Directed by George C. Wolfe; Presented in association with Seattle Repertory Theatre
- The Talking Cure (American Premiere) by Christopher Hampton; Directed by Gordon Davidson
- Stones in His Pockets by Marie Jones; Directed by Neel Keller
- Intimate Apparel by Lynn Nottage; Directed by Dan Sullivan; Presented in association with Roundabout Theatre Company

=== 2004/2005 ===
- Nothing But The Truth (West Coast Premiere) by John Kani; Directed by Janice Honeyman
- The School for Scandal by Richard Brisley Sheridan; Directed by Brian Bedford
- Edward Albee's The Goat, or Who is Sylvia?'; Directed by Warner Shook
- Electricidad (West Coast Premiere) by Luis Alfaro; Based on Sophocles's Electra; Directed by Lisa Peterson
- Stuff Happens (American Premiere) by David Hare; Directed by Gordon Davidson
- August Wilson's Radio Golf (World Premiere Production); Directed by Kenny Leon

=== 2005/2006 ===
- Romance (West Coast Premiere) by David Mamet; The Atlantic Theater Company production;Directed by Neil Pepe
- Lewis and Clark Reach the Euphrates (World Premiere) by Robert Schenkkan; Directed by Gregory Boyd
- The Cherry Orchard by Anton Chekhov; Adapted by Martin Sherman; Directed by Sean Mathias
- iWitness (American Premiere) by Joshua Sobol; Adapted by Barry Edelstein from an English Language Version by Joshua Sobol. Directed by Barry Edelstein
- Without Walls by Alfred Uhry; Directed by Christopher Ashley
- Water & Power (World Premiere); Written by Richard Montoya for Culture Clash; Directed by Lisa Peterson

=== 2006/2007 ===
- Doubt by John Patrick Shanley; Directed by Doug Hughes; Presented at the Ahmanson Theatre
- Nightingale (American Premiere) Written and performed by Lynn Redgrave; Directed by Joseph Hardy
- 13 (World Premiere) Music and Lyrics by Jason Robert Brown; Book by Dan Elish; Directed by Todd Graff
- Distracted (World Premiere) by Lisa Loomer; Directed by Leonard Foglia
- Yellow Face (World Premiere) by David Henry Hwang; Directed by Leigh Silverman; Presented in association with the Public Theater and East West Players

=== 2007/2008 ===
- The History Boys by Alan Bennett; Directed by Paul Miller; Original Direction by Nicholas Hytner; Presented at the Ahmanson Theatre.
- Sweeney Todd Music and Lyrics by Stephen Sondheim; Book by Hugh Wheeler; From an Adaptation by Christopher Bond; Music Orchestrated by Sarah Travis; Directed and Designed by John Doyle; Presented at the Ahmanson Theatre
- The House of Blue Leaves by John Guare; Directed by Nicholas Martin
- The School of Night (American Premiere) by Peter Whelan; Directed by Bill Alexander

=== 2009 ===
- Pippin Book by Roger O. Hirson; Music and Lyrics by Stephen Schwartz; Directed and Choreographed by Jeff Calhoun; Co-produced with Deaf West Theatre
- Lydia by Octavio Solis; Directed by Juliette Carrillo
- Oleanna by David Mamet; Directed by Dough Hughes; Starring: Bill Pullman and Julia Stiles
- Parade Book by Alfred Uhry; Music and Lyrics by Jason Robert Brown; Directed and choreographed by Rob Ashford Presented in associate with the Donmar Warehouse; Starring: T.R. Knight, Lara Pulver, Charlotte d'Amboise, Christian Hoff, Phoebe Strole
- Palestine, New Mexico (World Premiere) by Richard Montoya for Culture Clash; Directed by Lisa Peterson

== 2010s ==
=== 2010 ===
- The Subject Was Roses by Frank D. Gilroy; Directed by Neil Pepe; Starring Martin Sheen, Frances Conroy and Brian Geraghty
- Bengal Tiger at the Baghdad Zoo by Rajiv Joseph; Directed by Moisés Kaufman
- The Lieutenant of Inishmore by Martin McDonagh; Directed by Wilson Milam
- The Glass Menagerie by Tennessee Williams; Directed by Gordon Edelstein; Starring Judith Ivey
- Randy Newman's Harps and Angels Music and Lyrics by Randy Newman; Conceived by Jack Viertel; Musical Staging by Warren Carlyle; Directed by Jerry Zaks

=== 2011 ===
- Stories by Heart featuring the works of P.G. Wodehouse and Ring Lardner; Conceived, written and performed by John Lithgow
- 33 Variations written and directed by Moisés Kaufman; Starring Jane Fonda
- Burn This by Lanford Wilson; Directed by Nicholas Martin
- Above the Call; Beyond the Duty written and performed by James McEachin; NOTE: This production was not part of the official MTF season.

=== 2012 ===
- Clybourne Park by Bruce Norris; Directed by Pam MacKinnon
- Waiting for Godot by Samuel Beckett; Directed by Michael Arabian
- Los Otros by Ellen Fitzhugh and Michael John LaChiusa; Directed by Graciela Daniele
- Red by John Logan; Directed by Michael Grandage
- November by David Mamet
- Other Desert Cities by Jon Robin Baitz; Directed by Joe Mantello

=== 2013 ===
- Tribes by Nina Raine; Directed by David Cromer
- Humor Abuse by Lorenzo Pisoni
- Joe Turner's Come and Gone by August Wilson; Directed by Phylicia Rashad
- A Parallelogram by Bruce Norris; Directed by Anna D. Shapiro
- The Steward of Christendom by Sebastian Barry; Directed by Steven Robman
- [What the Butler Saw by Joe Orton; Directed by John Tillinger was originally scheduled for the 2013 season but was postponed until the following season.]

=== 2014 ===
- Vanya and Sonia and Masha and Spike by Christopher Durang; Directed by Nicholas Martin
- The Tallest Tree in the Forest by Daniel Beaty; Directed by Daniel Beaty
- Marjorie Prime by Jordan Harrison; Directed by Pam MacKinnon
- The Last Confession by Roger Crane (shown at Ahmanson Theatre)
- Buyer & Cellar by Jonathan Tolins
- What the Butler Saw by Joe Orton; Directed by John Tillinger

=== 2015 ===
- The Price by Arthur Miller; Directed by Garry Hynes
- Immediate Family by Paul Oakley Stovall; Directed by Phylicia Rashad
- Bent by Martin Sherman; Directed by Moisés Kaufman
- Appropriate by Branden Jacobs-Jenkins; Directed by Eric Ting
- The Christians by Lucas Hnath; Directed by Les Waters

=== 2016 ===
- The Beauty Queen of Leenane by Martin McDonagh; Directed by Garry Hynes
- Ma Rainey's Black Bottom by August Wilson; Directed by Phylicia Rashad
- Disgraced by Ayad Akhtar; Directed by Kimberly Senior
- Father Comes Home from the Wars by Suzan-Lori Parks; Directed by Jo Bonney
- The Mystery of Love & Sex by Bathsheba Doran; Directed by Robert Egan

=== 2017 ===
- Water by the Spoonful by Quiara Alegría Hudes; Directed by Lileana Blain-Cruz
- Head of Passes by Tarell Alvin McCraney; Directed by Tina Landau
- Heisenberg by Simon Stephens; Directed by Mark Brokaw
- Archduke by Rajiv Joseph; Directed by Giovanna Sardelli
- Remote L.A. written and directed by Stefan Kaegi and Jörg Karrenbauer
- Zoot Suit written and directed by Luis Valdez

=== 2018 ===
- Sweat by Lynn Nottage; Directed by Lisa Peterson
- Valley of the Heart written and directed by Luis Valdez
- Linda Vista by Tracy Letts; Directed by Dexter Bullard
- Lackawanna Blues written and directed by Ruben Santiago-Hudson
- Happy Days by Samuel Beckett; Directed by James Bundy
