= Francesca Coppa =

American scholar of literature

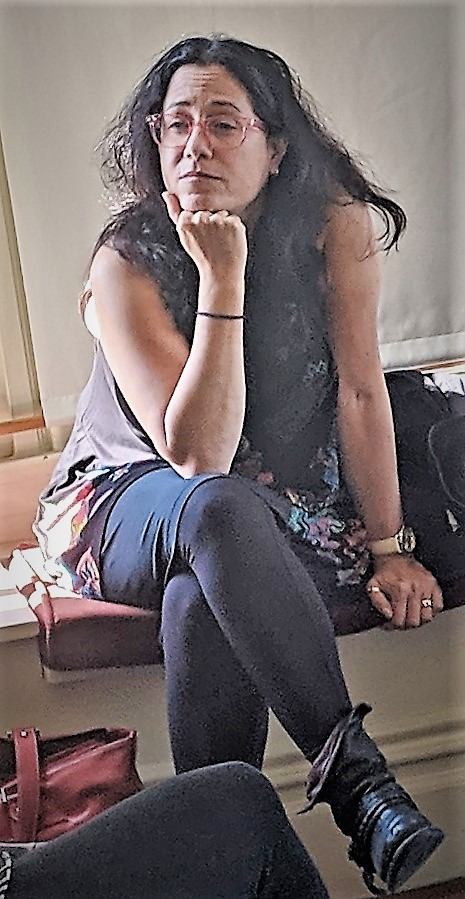
Coppa at the Berkeley Center for New Media in 2019

Francesca Coppa (born March 26, 1970) is an American scholar whose research has encompassed British drama, performance studies and fan studies. In English literature, she is known for her work on the British writer Joe Orton; she edited several of his early novels and plays for their first publication in 1998–99, more than thirty years after his murder, and compiled an essay collection, Joe Orton: A Casebook (2003). She has also published on Oscar Wilde. In the fan-studies field, Coppa is known for documenting the history of media fandom and, in particular, of fanvids, a type of fan-made video. She co-founded the Organization for Transformative Works in 2007, originated the idea of interpreting fan fiction as performance, and in 2017, published the first collection of fan fiction designed for teaching purposes. As of 2021, Coppa is a professor of English at Muhlenberg College, Pennsylvania.

== Biography ==
Coppa comes from Brooklyn. She gained her BA from Columbia College, Columbia University (1991), and her MA in English literature from New York University (1993). Her PhD (1997), also from New York University, was supervised by Una Chaudhuri; her thesis is entitled "Blood and aphorism: Joe Orton, theatre, and the new aristocracy in Great Britain".

As of 2021, she is a professor of English, Theatre, and Film Studies at Muhlenberg College in Allentown, Pennsylvania, where she was previously the director of film studies and also director of women's and gender studies. Her current research interests include British drama, sexuality theory, and media, performance and fan studies.

== Research and writings ==
=== Joe Orton ===
Coppa is known for her work on Joe Orton, a British playwright and novelist who came to prominence in 1963 and whose career was cut short by his murder by his lover, Kenneth Halliwell, in 1967. She started to research Orton formally in 1994, based on an archive of materials at Boston University, (Note: Coppa dates her earliest scholarly work on Orton to 1987.) as well as papers that she found Orton's sister had been keeping at home in a cardboard box. Coppa says that Orton's writings have "challenged and delighted me", citing "the perfection of his word choice, his almost-tangible glee at his own inventiveness, the dead-on rightness of his social anger, his confident assertion of sexual desire." She highlights the rapid pace of social change during his brief career, and states that the "many contradictions" of a man who was "young, working-class, intellectual, homosexual, and 'macho' all at the same time" render Orton "an almost irresistible symbol."

Many of Orton's early works had never been published, and Coppa edited two of his plays – Fred and Madge (written in 1959) and The Visitors (1961) – for first publication in 1998. In the same year, she edited for first publication his earliest solo novel, Between Us Girls, a parody in diary format written in 1957, and contributed a thirty-page introduction covering his life and career, described by Elaine Showalter as "excellent" and William Hutchings as "useful". Coppa recognizes the bisexual male character Bob Kennedy, who rescues and marries the novel's protagonist Susan, not only as a forerunner to later characters, but also as a model for Orton to reinvent himself as "the successful playwright as swaggering hooligan, ex-convict, working-class tough in a leather jacket". She also edited and introduced Lord Cucumber and The Boy Hairdresser, two of five short novels he wrote in collaboration with Halliwell, on their first publication in 1999.

She edited Joe Orton: A Casebook (2003), a collection of twelve essays, split into those that address Orton's works as literature and those that attempt to place them in the context of his life. The first section contains essays examining the plays Entertaining Mr. Sloane, The Good and Faithful Servant and The Erpingham Camp, as well as comparisons with Oscar Wilde, Caryl Churchill and even Jane Austen. The second section includes essays focusing on Orton's sexuality, his diaries, and the context in which he wrote, and includes a contribution by Orton and Halliwell's biographer, Simon Shepherd. Coppa wrote the final essay on a 1995 conversation between the actor John Alderton and Orton's sister, who represents his estate. Tom Smith, in a review for Theatre Journal, describes the collection as an "excellent scholarly resource" with "diverse and interesting" content, but considers that Coppa has not gone far enough towards broadening Orton scholarship, which has focused on a limited selection of his works.

=== Other literature, theatre studies ===
Orton has frequently been likened to Wilde, and Coppa has also published on the latter. In 2010, she surveyed representations of Wilde in twentieth-century plays, including Micheál Mac Liammóir's one-man show, The Importance of Being Oscar, drawing attention to a prevalent "revisionist view" of Wilde's lover Lord Alfred Douglas, and concluding that the works are more informative about their own times than that of Wilde. The reviewer Timothy Peltason agrees with her conclusions but points out that Coppa also considers the works from a "somewhat limiting" current perspective, holding the works to "un-Wildean standards of accuracy and fairness in representation". Her other publications on Wilde include an introduction to The Importance of Being Earnest (2015), a "clearly written" chapter on performance theory, and an "insightful" article on teaching Lady Windermere's Fan, in which she states that in her experience, Wilde needs to be taught as "melodramatist, modernist, and postmodernist all at once". She has also published on the early plays of Harold Pinter and queer sexuality in Brideshead Revisited.

Coppa co-edited Performing Magic on the Western Stage: From the Eighteenth Century to the Present (2008), with Lawrence Hass and James Peck, a collection that includes both practical magicians and researchers on stage magic. She contributed an essay about the low status accorded to the female assistant compared with the male conjuror.

=== Fan studies ===
In 2007, with Naomi Novik, Rebecca Tushnet and others, Coppa was a founder of the Organization for Transformative Works (OTW), a nonprofit body that aims "to provide access to and preserve the history of fanworks and fan cultures"; she served on the board until 2012, and remains an emeritus director. The fandom expert Henry Jenkins highlights her work on challenging intellectual property rights as applied to fanworks. She is particularly known for her work documenting the history of the fanvid – which she defines as "a visual essay" that intends "to make an argument or tell a story" and uses the accompanying music track as "an interpretive lens to help the viewer to see the source text differently" – and has published on vidding as a women's practice, distinct from other forms of fan-created videos. In 2012, she co-edited a special issue of the journal Transformative Works and Cultures entitled "Fan/Remix Video", with Julie Levin Russo. Her highest-cited research paper is on the history of American media fandom, (Note: "A brief history of media fandom" (2006) had 405 citations in Google Scholar in a search on February 2, 2021.) which seeks to differentiate it from general science fiction fandom, and has been criticized for not covering non-western fandoms. In a 2006 paper, Coppa analyzed fan fiction using performance theory, positing that fan fiction writers respond to "dramatic, not literary, modes of storytelling" and so should be assessed by "performative rather than literary criteria"; she developed the theory to address common criticisms of fan fiction, including its focus on the physical, its repetitious and relatively ephemeral nature, and its requirement for an audience. In 2014, she wrote a response to Jonathan Gray, Cornel Sandvoss and C. Lee Harrington's 2007 dismissive description of first-wave fan studies as the "Fandom Is Beautiful" era, entitled "Fuck Yeah, Fandom Is Beautiful".

Coppa edited a collection of fan fiction, The Fanfiction Reader: Folk Tales for the Digital Age, published by University of Michigan Press in 2017 and intended as a college-level teaching text. Describing her motivations for creating the collection, Coppa states: "I want people to see that fanfiction is legal – a transformative fair use that can be published and sold in certain contexts – and also that it's an art." Jenkins describes The Fanfiction Reader as "the first anthology of fan fiction for use in the classroom", and praises Coppa and University of Michigan Press for their "courage" in tackling what he refers to as "taboos" relating to publishing fan fiction. Stephanie Burt points out that the many previous academic works on fan fiction did not include extended examples and "a printed collection of the stuff, from a university press, with no serial numbers removed" would probably not have been possible as recently as 2012 because of the threat of legal action, attributing the change at least in part to the advocacy of OTW.

The Fanfiction Reader assembles short, non-adult-rated stories covering a range of fan fiction genres, based in widely known American or British sources, which Burt describes as Coppa's idea of "good on-ramps to the phenomenon". Coppa organizes the anthology as a "modern Canterbury Tales", with the chapter titles referencing this work. The authors include Astolat, KaydeeFalls, Rheanna, Speranza and Yahtzee, and the stories range in date between 1998 and 2017. Coppa provides a general overview of fan fiction, including five different definitions, together with brief introductions to each fandom, which include Buffy, Doctor Who, Harry Potter, James Bond, Star Trek and Supernatural, as well as real-person fiction, which treats real celebrities as if they were fictional characters. She also locates the stories within their context, emphasizing the communal and collaborative nature of fannish writing, and includes multiple "meta" stories, which comment on fan writing itself. Burt, in a review for The New Yorker, describes most of the stories in the collection as "thoughtful, and delightful", but notes that fan fiction encountered in such a book is divorced from the actual experience of finding and reading fan fiction. Lorraine M. Dubuisson, in a review for Transformative Works and Cultures, recommends the collection for teaching purposes, but highlights the relatively limited focus, which excludes non-western sources and sexually explicit works. Burt describes The Fanfiction Reader as accessible and a "good first encounter with the genus", and Dubuisson generally agrees but questions whether Coppa's background information will prove adequate to allow readers to understand stories based in multiple-season television series. The book won the Media and Cultural Studies category of the Association of American Publishers's Prose Awards in 2018.

== Selected publications ==
Books

- Francesca Coppa, Vidding: A History (University of Michigan Press; 2022) (ISBN 9780472038527)

Edited books

- Kirsty Sedgman, Francesca Coppa, and Matt Hills, eds. Theatre Fandom: Engaged Audiences in the Twenty-first Century (University of Iowa Press; 2025) (ISBN 9781685970123)
- Francesca Coppa, ed. The Fanfiction Reader: Folk Tales for the Digital Age (University of Michigan Press; 2017) (ISBN 9780472073481)
- Francesca Coppa, Lawrence Haas, James Peck, eds. Performing Magic on the Western Stage: From the Eighteenth Century to the Present (Palgrave Macmillan; 2008) (ISBN 978-0-230-60788-0)
- Francesca Coppa, ed. Joe Orton: A Casebook (Routledge; 2003) (ISBN 9780815336273)
- Joe Orton. Fred and Madge and The Visitors (Francesca Coppa, ed.) (Nick Hern Books; 1998) (ISBN 1 85459 354 4)
- Joe Orton. Between Us Girls (Francesca Coppa, ed.) (Nick Hern Books; 1998) (ISBN 1 85459 374 9)

Research papers

- Francesca Coppa (2008). "Women, Star Trek, and the early development of fannish vidding", Transformative Works and Cultures 1 doi:10.3983/twc.2008.044
- Francesca Coppa. "A brief history of media fandom", in Karen Hellekson, Kristina Busse, eds, Fan Fiction and Fan Communities in the Age of the Internet (McFarland; 2006) (ISBN 9780786426409)
- Francesca Coppa. "Writing bodies in space: Media fanfiction as theatrical performance", in Hellekson & Busse, 2006 and reprinted in Hellekson, Busse, eds, The Fan Fiction Studies Reader (University of Iowa Press; 2014) (ISBN 9781609382278)
