= The Ruffian on the Stair =

1964 play by Joe Orton

- Original language: English
- Written by: Joe Orton

Premiere
- Date: 31 August 1964
- Place: BBC Third Programme, England

The Ruffian on the Stair is a play by British playwright Joe Orton which was first broadcast on BBC Radio in 1964, in a production by John Tydeman. It is an unsympathetic yet comedic one-act portrayal of working class England, as played out by a couple and a mysterious young man who toys with their lives. It was based on The Boy Hairdresser, a novel by Orton and his lover Kenneth Halliwell. The title and play are based on a few lines from poet and dramatist William Ernest Henley: "Madam Life's a piece in bloom, / Death goes dogging everywhere: / She's the tenant of the room, / He's the ruffian on the stair." Ruffian is not as renowned as other works such as Loot and What the Butler Saw, but it is still staged on occasion.

== Sample dialogue ==
Joyce: "Have you got an appointment today?"

Mike: "Yes, I'm to be at King’s Cross station at eleven. I'm meeting a man in the toilet."

Joyce: "You always go to such interesting places."

== Plot ==
Mike and Joyce are a poor London couple living in a bedsit. Mike is a self-described "derelict", ex-boxer Roman Catholic thug from Donegal, who—despite claiming the dole—has a sideline as a proto-white van man, running people down for cash. Joyce is an ex-prostitute, and a Protestant from London.

One day while Joyce is alone, a young and attractive man named Wilson arrives, asking for a room. During the conversation, he terrifies and threatens her, demanding to know where Mike's gun is. It becomes clear that he has been watching the flat for some time. Nevertheless, he leaves without harming her, despite having found and aimed the gun at her head. Mike returns, and a distraught Joyce relates the story. Typically, Mike tells Joyce she's overreacting and actually sympathizes with the young man, much to Joyce's astonishment and aggravation. The next day, when Joyce is left alone with her thoughts, a series of sudden, violent noises emanate from the stairs outside their apartment door and the rest of the building (including broken windows, a broken lock, and the sound of a man urinating on the floorboards). She pleads loudly for the perpetrator to stop, which they finally do by the end of the scene but not after a prolonged aural torture for Joyce. Naturally, she assumes it is Wilson, and, upon relating this incident to Mike, she is met with a similar lack of support.

When Wilson does turn up again, he charms Mike using a claimed Irish ancestry, religious conviction, and his own considerable personal charms. During the conversation, the audience learns that Mike's last "job" was to kill Wilson's beloved elder brother Frank, with whom Wilson had been engaged in an incestuous affair. Wilson is damaged, grief-stricken, and after revenge; an unusual revenge, however, as he seeks to be shot by Mike ("I don't wanna be injured. I want to be dead") in order to rejoin Frank. To goad Mike into the killing, he claims to be having sex with Joyce, and to have known her since her days as a prostitute; in fact, it was Frank who had sex with Joyce (and other women) during his relationship with Wilson. The following day, Mike leaves the flat wracked with jealousy, despite Joyce's protestations of innocence. Wilson arrives again, removing his trousers and wedging the door shut, in order that Mike—upon his return—will think that he's having sex with Joyce. As Joyce points out, the situation is absurd; Wilson is "only a little boy" (the script suggests he's 18), and to make the situation more ridiculous, Mike doesn't come home when expected. Wilson sadly concludes that he's failed at this just like everything else, and moves to get dressed; moved, however, Joyce puts her arms around him.

It's at this point that Mike returns. Enraged, he shoots twice, killing Wilson with the second shot. Wilson survives long enough to reiterate his wish to be buried with Frank, then collapses. Mike and Joyce are both horrified by what has happened, but Joyce recovers quickly, planning what they'll tell the police. Suddenly, they notice that the first shot from Mike's gun knocked over Joyce's goldfish bowl, killing the fish inside. Both of them are far more upset about the goldfish than the dead boy, and thus the play ends.

== Original cast ==
- Joyce - Avis Bunnage
- Mike - Dermot Kelly
- Wilson - Kenneth Cranham

== Original stage productions ==
Peter Gill directed the play on stage at the Royal Court Theatre on 21 August 1966.

Original stage cast

- Joyce - Sheila Ballantine
- Mike - Bernard Gallagher
- Wilson - Kenneth Cranham

Together with The Erpingham Camp, the play was then performed the following year at the Royal Court, also directed by Gill, in a double bill, Crimes of Passion.

Crimes of Passion cast

- Joyce - Avril Elgar
- Mike - Bernard Gallagher
- Wilson - Michael Standing

== Adaptations ==
In 1973, ITV Sunday Night Theatre broadcast a production of the play directed by David Cunliffe, starring Judy Cornwell as Joyce, Michael Bryant as Mike, and Billy Hamon as Wilson.
