= Funeral Games (play) =

- Cover of First edition, Methuen 1970
- Original language: English
- Written by: Joe Orton
- Characters: Pringle, Caulfield, Tess, McCorquodale, Police Officers
- Genre: Farce

Premiere
- Date: 26 August 1968

Funeral Games is a 50-minute television play by Joe Orton.

Along with Orton's The Good and Faithful Servant, the play was originally written for the Associated Rediffusion series Seven Deadly Virtues, the sequel to its earlier Seven Deadly Sins, which had included his The Erpingham Camp.

Funeral Games followed the general format of the other plays by other writers in the series, in that viewers were expected to decide which virtue they were witnessing before the answer was revealed in the closing credits. The choices were courage, faith, hope, prudence, justice, charity, and temperance. The Good And Faithful Servant and Funeral Games represented faith and justice respectively, but ultimately only the first was included in the series, with the justice episode being The Whole Truth by John Bowen. Both were directed by James Ormerod, who had previously handled The Erpingham Camp.

The Funeral Games script eventually passed to Yorkshire Television, which produced it - along with an adaptation Entertaining Mr Sloane - as contributions to the Playhouse series. Sloane (directed by Peter Moffatt) was broadcast on 15 July 1968, and Games (directed by Ormerod) on 26 August 1968, both post-dating Orton's death. Both these plays still exist.

The play can be seen as a satire on the theme of Christian charity. It is also an attack on hypocrisy in general, and on religion and middle-class morality in particular. It displays Orton's hallmarks of black humour, outrageous characters, deliberate bad taste, and surreal situations.

== Plot ==
Cult leader, preacher, and con-artist Pringle hires thuggish criminal Caulfield to investigate an anonymous report that his wife Tess is having an affair with a defrocked Catholic priest.

It seems that the report is mistaken, and Tess' visits to the priest McCorquodale are innocent. However, McCorquodale has killed his own wife and buried her in the cellar. Pringle still wishes to kill Tess, but instead tells people she has 'gone away', a classic ploy used when one has killed one's wife. His intention is to gain respect as a killer. Tess agrees to live out of sight with McCorquodale.

Pringle's plans are in danger of being ruined when a reporter threatens his new reputation by suspecting that Tess is not dead at all, and accuses Pringle of being innocent.

== Cast ==
- Michael Denison - Pringle
- Vivien Merchant - Tessa
- Ian McShane - Caulfield
- Bill Fraser - McCorquodale

== Production history ==
Orton wrote Funeral Games in several drafts between July and November 1966, a period of intense productivity for him. Funeral Games is considered to be the transitional play between Loot and What the Butler Saw. In common with much of Orton's work, Funeral Games was regarded as very shocking in England on its first production.

The script of the play was first published by Methuen (Modern Plays series, 1970), and the play has enjoyed long-term popularity with amateur and fringe theatre companies in England.

There was a BBC Radio 4 production in 2008.
