= Performance (Canadian TV series) =

1970s Canadian anthology TV series

Performance is a Canadian television anthology series that aired on CBC Television from 1974 to 1978. The series presented one-hour dramatic television plays, predominantly adaptations of both Canadian and international literary works but also including some original films.

It premiered as a regular series in December 1974, and aired episodes regularly through 1975. In 1976 it was replaced as a regular series with For the Record, which commissioned primarily original new television films about social issues, although the Performance title was retained until 1978 as an occasional special title for other television films that did not fit the For the Record format.

== Episodes ==
=== 1974 ===
No.	Title	Directed by	Written by	Original release date
1	"An Angel Against the Night"	Ron Weyman	Lyal D. Brown	December 8, 1974
A family struggles after the failure of their family business. Stars George Waight, Jackie Burroughs, Cedric Smith and Demetri Mina.
2	"Find Volopchi!"	Rudi Dorn	Kaino Thomas	December 15, 1974
John Colicos stars as Volopchi, an illegal immigrant who relies on disguises to elude capture by immigration officials.
3	"Raisins and Almonds"	Don S. Williams	Fredelle Bruser Maynard	December 22, 1974
A young Jewish girl comes of age in the Canadian Prairies.
4	"Village Wooing"	Mario Prizek	George Bernard Shaw	December 29, 1974
Stars Paxton Whitehead as A and Patricia Gage as Z.

No.	Title	Directed by	Written by	Original release date
5	"The Good and Faithful Servant"	George Bloomfield	Joe Orton	January 5, 1975
Stars Cyril Cusack and Helen Burns.
6	"The Farm Show"	Ron Meraska	Theatre Passe Muraille	January 12, 1975
Repeat broadcast of film previously aired as an episode of Opening Night.
7	"Baptising"	Allan King	Alice Munro	January 19, 1975
8	"The Last of the Four-Letter Words"	Allan King	Nika Rylski	January 26, 1975
A young wife and mother battles cancer. Stars Jayne Eastwood and Les Carlson.
9	"Ten Lost Years"	John McGreevy	Barry Broadfoot	February 2, 1975
A dramatic adaptation of Barry Broadfoot's non-fiction book about Canada during the Great Depression. Stars Jackie Burroughs.
10	"The Man in the Tin Canoe"	John McGreevy	Barry Callaghan	February 9, 1975
Hudson's Bay Company administrator George Simpson (Douglas Campbell) and Rev. James Evans (Leo Burns) conflict over how to interact with the local indigenous population.
11	"A Bird in the House"	Allan King	Margaret Laurence	February 16, 1975
Repeat broadcast of film previously aired as part of the CBC Drama '73 anthology.
TBA	"The Middle Game"	Martin Lavut	Matt Cohen	February 23, 1975
A university professor (Maurice Good) faces a mid-life crisis and must confront what he really wants in life. Also stars Sean McCann and Charlotte Blunt.
TBA	"The Trial of Sinyavsky and Daniel"	Ted Kotcheff	Ted Kotcheff	March 9, 1975
An adaptation of Max Hayward's book On Trial, about the Soviet Sinyavsky–Daniel trial of 1966. Stars Alan Dobie and Robert A. Silverman.
TBA	"Mandelstam's Witness"	Jan Kadar	V. M. Rakoff	April 7, 1975
Adaptation of the memoirs of Nadezhda Mandelstam, the widow of Soviet poet and political prisoner Osip Mandelstam. Stars Ida Kamińska.
TBA	"The Betrayal"	Kurt Reis	James W. Nichol	April 27, 1975
TBA	"Going Down Slow"	Peter Carter	Barry Pearson	May 11, 1975
Adaptation of the novel by John Metcalf, starring John Scardino as an idealistic young teacher.
TBA	"Lulu Street"	Alvin Rakoff	Ann Henry	September 7, 1975
A clergyman (James Blendick) is torn between his family life and activism against the context of the Winnipeg General Strike.
TBA	"The Captain of Köpenick"	David Giles	John Mortimer	November 16, 1975
Adaptation of the play by Carl Zuckmayer, starring Donald Pleasence in the lead role.
TBA	"Summer Mournings '59"	Janine Manatis	Elisabeth Harvor	November 23, 1975
TBA	"The Ottawa Valley"	Danièle J. Suissa	Alice Munro	November 23, 1975
TBA	"Six War Years"	Allan King	Norman Klenman	November 30, 1975
Adaptation of Barry Broadfoot's book about Canada in World War II.

=== 1976 ===
No.	Title	Directed by	Written by	Original release date
TBA	"Red Emma"	Allan King, Martin Kinch	Carol Bolt	January 4, 1976
The early years of influential anarchist activist Emma Goldman. Stars Chapelle Jaffe.
TBA	"Fellowship"	Paul Almond	Michael Tait	March 24, 1976
An adaptation of Michael Tait's play about a schismatic religious community, starring Donald Moffat as its defrocked minister, Patricia Hamilton as his wife, and Neil Vipond as a gay priest who tries to negotiate returning the church into communion with its denomination. Originally scheduled to air in prime time on March 3, it was instead rescheduled to an irregular late-night slot on March 24, due to the sensitivity of some of its content.
TBA	"An Enemy of the People"	Unknown	Henrik Ibsen, Norman Klenman (tr.)	March 28, 1976
Starring Robin Gammell.

=== 1977 ===
No.	Title	Directed by	Written by	Original release date
TBA	"The Man Who Wanted to Be Happy"	Ron Weyman	Douglas Bowie	March 6, 1977
Wally Bliss (Neil Dainard) is a radio host who has become cynical and jaded, and hires Hilary Deane (Jackie Burroughs), who runs an agency helping people to achieve their ambitions, to help him become happy again.
TBA	"A Gun, a Grand and a Girl"	Ron Weyman	Douglas Bowie	March 20, 1977
Chuck Shamata stars as a physical education teacher who takes on a side job as an enforcer for a loan shark.
TBA	"On the Job"	Unknown	David Fennario	March 27, 1977

=== 1978 ===
No.	Title	Directed by	Written by	Original release date
TBA	"Brooke"	Unknown	Betty Lambert, Anna Reiser	March 26, 1978
Stars Diane D'Aquila as a woman struggling to decide whether or not to stay with her husband (Neil Munro) when he announces that he does not want children.

== Awards ==
Jayne Eastwood won the Earle Grey Award for best performance in a television film at the 5th ACTRA Awards in 1976 for The Last of the Four Letter Words.
