= The Visitors (play) =

- Original language: English
- Written by: Joe Orton

The Visitors is a 1961 one-act play by British playwright Joe Orton. The BBC and the Royal Court Theatre had considered the work but ultimately rejected it, despite both having insisted that the writing was "excellent." Orton's career took off in 1964 with the staging of his Entertaining Mr. Sloane, and The Visitors (aka The Visit) remained forgotten until its UK publication in 1998 by Nick Hern Books; a US edition from Grove Press followed in 1999.

== Synopsis ==
Kemp, a man facing death, is visited in hospital by his middle-aged daughter, Mrs. Platt. She and the nurse exchange optimistic clichés that completely ignore the reality of his situation.

== Criticism ==
Elaine Showalter describes it and Fred & Madge, with which it was published, as reading "as if they had just been written, and are wittier than most of what gets staged in the West End", suggesting that they should be produced. Stephen Grecco describes the two plays as "replete with the redundancies and dead ends typical of very early drafts" and considers neither play to be "riveting enough" for production. He identifies the father and daughter characters with those in Entertaining Mr. Sloane, and the nursing staff as reminiscent of the character Fay in Loot.
