= Loot (play) =

1965 play by Joe Orton

- Front cover of programme for the 1992 production at the Lyric Hammersmith
- Original language: English
- Written by: Joe Orton
- Characters: McLeavy, Fay, Hal, Dennis, Truscott, Meadows
- Genre: Farce

Premiere
- Date: 1 February 1965
- Place: Cambridge, England

Loot is a two-act play by the English playwright Joe Orton. The play is a dark farce that satirises the Roman Catholic Church, social attitudes to death, and the integrity of the police force.

Loot was Orton's third major production, following Entertaining Mr Sloane and the television play The Good and Faithful Servant. Playing with the conventions of popular farce, Orton creates a hectic world and examines English attitudes and perceptions in the mid-twentieth century. The play won several awards in its London run and has had many revivals.

== Plot outline ==
Loot follows the fortunes of two young thieves, Hal and Dennis. Together they rob the bank next to the funeral parlour where Dennis works and return to Hal's home to hide the money. Hal's mother has just died and the money is hidden in her coffin while her body keeps on appearing around the house. Upon the arrival of Inspector Truscott, the plot becomes bizarre as Hal and Dennis try to keep him off their trail, aided by Nurse McMahon and to the despair of Hal's father, Mr. McLeavy. The play satirises the rituals of bereavement, and the mismatch between nominal standards of behaviour—religious and secular—and people's actual conduct. The police, as represented by Inspector Truscott, are depicted as venal and corrupt.

As is typical of Orton's writing the humour of the dialogue arises from the contrast between the shocking and bizarre elements that punctuate what the characters say and the mechanically genteel utterance that predominates in their speech.

== Production history ==
Orton completed a first draft in October 1964, which premiered at the Arts Theatre, Cambridge on 1 February 1965. The production starred Geraldine McEwan, Kenneth Williams, Duncan Macrae and Ian McShane and was directed by Peter Wood.

Responses to the first production were extremely mixed, with many in the audience outraged, as Orton had intended, but largely negative reviews also affected the box office. The London Evening News called it "one of the most revolting things I've ever seen." The first run ended at Wimbledon on 20 March 1965 with the play considered a flop due to its problems with repeated script rewrites, uneven direction, a stylish but unsympathetic set, and what many considered the miscasting of Williams.

''Loot'' was successfully revived the following year, however. in two separate productions.

The first was directed by Braham Murray artistic director of the Century Theatre and performed at the new University Theatre in Manchester. Encouraged by the producer Michael Codron, who had been associated with both the successful London production of Entertaining Mr Sloane and the much less successful production of Loot outside London the previous year, Braham met with Orton and agreed to try again with a production more to Orton’s taste than the original. He also agreed to get much of the original text – censored before the first production - restored and in a personal visit to the Lord Chamberlain’s (censor’s) office succeeded in doing so. Cut by the author from three to two acts in rehearsals but now including most of the originally censored material, and starring Julian Chagrin as Truscott, supported by Michael Elwyn and Peter Childs as Hal and Dennis, the play opened in Spring 1966 in Manchester. Loot for the first time received favourable reviews and transferred to London with a new director and cast.

Now at the Jeanette Cochrane Theatre in Holborn. It opened on 27 September 1966 with Gerry Duggan as McLeavy, Sheila Ballantine as Fay, Kenneth Cranham as Hal, Simon Ward as Dennis, and Michael Bates as Inspector Truscott. It was directed by Charles Marowitz and designed by Tony Carruthers. The production transferred to the Criterion Theatre in November 1966.

The play had its first Broadway production in New York at the Biltmore Theatre. It opened on 18 March 1968. Kenneth Cranham played Hal (as he had in the 1966 London production), James Hunter played Dennis, Liam Redmond played McLeavy, Carole Shelley played Fay, George Rose played Truscott, and Norman Barrs played Meadows. It was directed by Derek Goldby and designed by William Ritmann. The play was profiled in the William Goldman book The Season: A Candid Look at Broadway.

Albert Finney directed a production at the Royal Court Theatre as part of its Joe Orton Festival. This production opened on 3 June 1975. Arthur O'Sullivan played McLeavy, Jill Bennett played Fay, David Troughton played Hal, James Aubrey played Dennis, Philip Stone played Truscott, and Michael O'Hagan played Meadows. It was designed by Douglas Heap, with costumes by Harriet Geddes.

Kenneth Williams, who had created the role of the Inspector in the first production in 1965, directed the play in 1980. The production opened on 11 September at the Lyric Theatre, Hammersmith and transferred to the Arts Theatre in London's West End on 20 October. Neil McCarthy played McLeavy, Joan Blackham played Fay, Rory Edwards played Hal, Philip Martin Brown played Dennis, John Malcolm played Truscott, and John Huntly was Meadows. Produced by Bill Kenwright, it was designed by Saul Radomsky.

A production was staged at the Lyric Theatre in 1984 during the run of which the actor Leonard Rossiter died whilst waiting to go on stage.

The play was staged at the Manhattan Theatre Club in a production directed by John Tillinger. It opened on 18 February 1986. Kevin Bacon played Dennis, Željko Ivanek played Hal, Zoë Wanamaker played Fay, Charles Keating played McLeavy, Joseph Maher played Truscott (winning a Drama Desk Award for his performance), and Nick Ullett played Meadows. This production transferred to the Music Box Theatre on Broadway on 28 June 1986. Alec Baldwin, in his Broadway debut, replaced Kevin Bacon in the role of Dennis. It was awarded the 1986 Outer Critics Circle Awards for best revival and best director.

The Lyric Hammersmith staged a production directed by Peter James, which opened on 7 May 1992. Patrick O'Connell played McLeavy, Dearbhla Molloy played Fay, Ben Walden played Hal, Colin Hurley played Dennis, David Troughton (who had played Hal in the 1975 Royal Court production) played Truscott, and Richard Hodder played Meadows. It was designed by Bernard Culshaw.

In June 2001 Braham Murray directed a production at the Royal Exchange, Manchester with Derek Griffiths as Truscott, Gabrielle Drake as Fay and Colin Prockter as McLeavy.

Loot was revived from 11 December 2008 to 31 January 2009 at the Tricycle Theatre, London starring Matt Di Angelo and David Haig as Hal and Truscott. It transferred to Theatre Royal, Newcastle and ran between 2–7 February 2009.

A 2017 production directed by Michael Fentiman was staged at the Park Theatre, Finsbury Park, before transferring to the Watermill Theatre, Newbury. Christopher Fulford played Inspector Truscott and Sinead Matthews Nurse McMahon. The dead body was played by Anah Ruddin. Positive reviews for the production were published in The Independent, The Daily Telegraph, The Guardian and the Sunday Express. Michael Billington in The Guardian gave Loot a five star rating, commenting on the way Fentiman referenced the "shock tactics" in Orton's work, and stating: "the result not only sharpens an already subversive text but yields a first-rate production by Michael Fentiman that reminds us of the serious intent behind Orton’s drollery."

== Film version ==
- Loot was made into a film of the same name in 1970, directed by Silvio Narizzano and starring Richard Attenborough, Lee Remick, Hywel Bennett and comedian Dick Emery.

== Awards and nominations ==
=== 1986 Broadway revival ===
Year	Award	Category	Nominee	Result
1986	Tony Award	Best Revival		Nominated
1986	Tony Award	Best Featured Actor in a Play	Charles Keating	Nominated
1986	Tony Award	Best Featured Actor in a Play	Joseph Maher	Nominated
1986	Tony Award	Best Featured Actress in a Play	Zoe Wanamaker	Nominated
1986	Tony Award	Best Direction of a Play	John Tillinger	Nominated
1986	Drama Desk Award	Outstanding Revival		Nominated
1986	Drama Desk Award	Outstanding Featured Actor in a Play	Joseph Maher	Won
1986	Drama Desk Award	Outstanding Featured Actress in a Play	Zoe Wanamaker	Nominated
1986	Drama Desk Award	Outstanding Director of a Play	John Tillinger	Nominated
1986	Outer Critics Circle Award	Outstanding Revival of a Play		Won
1986	Outer Critics Circle Award	Outstanding Direction of a Play	John Tillinger	Won
1986	Theatre World Award		Alec Baldwin	Won

== Sources ==
- Banham, Martin, ed. 1998. The Cambridge Guide to Theatre. Cambridge: Cambridge UP. ISBN 0-521-43437-8.
- Bigsby, C. W. E. 1982. Joe Orton. Contemporary Writers ser. London: Routledge. ISBN 0-416-31690-5.
- Burke, Arthur. 2001. Laughter in the Dark - The Plays of Joe Orton. Billericay, Essex: Greenwich Exchange. ISBN 1-871551-56-0.
- Charney, Maurice. 1984. Joe Orton. Grove Press Modern Dramatists ser. NY: Grove P. ISBN 0-394-54241-X.
- Coppa, Francesca, ed. 2002. Joe Orton: A Casebook. Casebooks on Modern Dramatists ser. London: Routledge. ISBN 0-8153-3627-6.
- DiGaetani, John Louis. 2008. Stages of Struggle: Modern Playwrights and Their Psychological Inspirations. Jefferson: McFarland. ISBN 0-7864-3157-1.
- Orton, Joe. 1976. The Complete Plays. London: Methuen. ISBN 0-413-34610-2.
- Ruskino, Susan. 1995. Joe Orton. Twayne's English Authors ser. Boston: Twayne. ISBN 0-8057-7034-8.
