= Kenneth Cranham =

British actor (born 1944)

Kenneth Cranham CBE
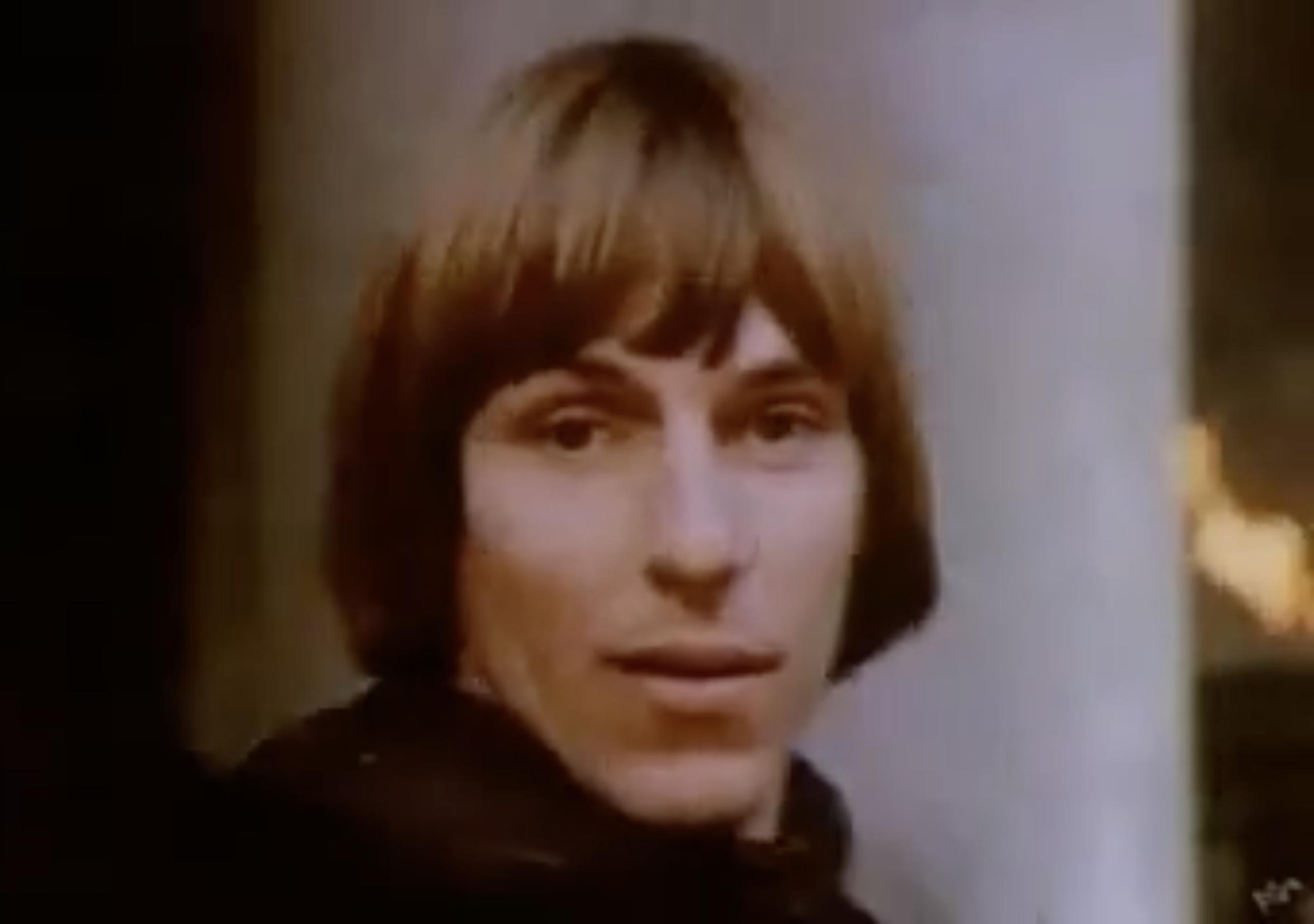
- Cranham in Brother Sun, Sister Moon (1972)
- Born: 12 December 1944 (age 81); Dunfermline, Fife, Scotland
- Occupation: Actor
- Years active: 1963–present
- Spouse(s): Diana Quick (m. 1974; div. 1978) Fiona Victory
- Partner: Charlotte Cornwell
- Children: 2

Kenneth Cranham CBE (born 12 December 1944) is a British actor. He won the Olivier Award for Best Actor in a Play for his performance in The Father in 2016, after being nominated for An Inspector Calls in 1993.

His notable screen roles were in Oliver! (1968), Hellbound: Hellraiser II (1988), Chocolat (1988), Layer Cake (2004), Gangster No. 1 (2000), Hot Fuzz (2007), Maleficent (2014) and Film Stars Don't Die in Liverpool (2017). On television he has appeared in Budgie (1972), Shine on Harvey Moon (1982-1985) as the titular lead, Boon (1989), Minder (1993), Rome (2005), War & Peace (2016) and The White Princess (2017).

On stage, Cranham appeared in three Joe Orton plays including the radio and stage premieres of The Ruffian on the Stair and the first successful revival of Loot.

== Early life ==
Cranham was born in Dunfermline, Fife, the son of Lochgelly-born Margaret McKay Cranham (née Ferguson) and Ronald Cranham, a London-born civil servant. Cranham trained at the National Youth Theatre and the Royal Academy of Dramatic Art, graduating in 1966 with a RADA Diploma.

== Career ==
=== Television and film ===
He starred in the title role in the popular 1980s comedy drama Shine on Harvey Moon, prior to which he had appeared as Charlie Collins in A Family at War (1971). He also appeared in Oliver! (1968), Up Pompeii (1971), Brother Sun, Sister Moon (1972), Danger UXB (1979) Chocolat (1988), Gangster No. 1 (2000), Layer Cake (2004), Hot Fuzz (2007), Maleficent (2014) and Film Stars Don't Die in Liverpool (2017). He was cast as the deranged Philip Channard and his Cenobitic alter-ego in the Horror film Hellbound: Hellraiser II.

On television he has appeared in Budgie (1972), Boon (1989), Minder (1993), Rome (2007), Merlin (2008), Death in Paradise (2013), War & Peace (2016) and The White Princess (2017).

=== Theatre ===
Among many stage credits are West End productions of Entertaining Mr Sloane, Loot, An Inspector Calls (both transferring to Broadway), The Ruffian on the Stair, The Birthday Party and Gaslight (at the Old Vic). For his role as Inspector Goole in An Inspector Calls, he was nominated for a Olivier Award for Best Actor in a Play. It took another 23 years before winning the award when in 2016, Cranham won the Olivier Award for Best Actor in a Play for his role as Andre in Florian Zeller's The Father. Cranham's performance was described as "the performance of his life" by Michael Coveney of WhatsOnStage.com.

=== Radio ===
For BBC Radio 4's Afternoon Play, Cranham has played DS Max Matthews in The Interrogation by Roy Williams (2012–present) and starred as Thomas Gradgrind in BBC Radio's 2007 adaptation of Dickens' Hard Times.

== Honours ==
Cranham was appointed Commander of the Order of the British Empire (CBE) in the 2023 Birthday Honours for services to drama.

== Personal life ==
His first wife was actress Diana Quick. He has two daughters: one from a relationship with actress Charlotte Cornwell, and one with his second wife, to whom he is still married, actress Fiona Victory.

== Filmography ==
=== Film ===
- Oliver! (1968) as Noah Claypole
- Otley (1968) as Kid #3
- Fragment of Fear (1970) as Joe
- All the Way Up (1970) as Tom Midway
- Up Pompeii (1971) as First Christian
- Brother Sun, Sister Moon (1972) as Paolo
- Vampira (1974) as Paddy, the Delinquent
- Robin and Marian (1976) as Jack's Apprentice
- Peer Gynt (1976)
- Joseph Andrews (1977) as The Wicked Squire
- Chocolat (1988) as Boothby
- Stealing Heaven (1988) as Suger
- Hellbound: Hellraiser II (1988) as Dr. Philip Channard / Channard Cenobite
- Frederick Forsyth Presents: Just Another Secret (1989) as Brosch
- A Little Bit Of Lippy (1989) as Reggie Titherington
- Prospero's Books (1991) as Sebastian
- Under Suspicion (1991) as Frank
- Tale of a Vampire (1992) as Edgar
- Bed of Roses (1996) as Simon
- Deep in the Heart (1996) as Robert Flaherty
- The Boxer (1997) as Matt MaGuire
- RPM (1998) as Biggerman
- Vigo (1998) as The Producer
- Women Talking Dirty (1999) as George
- The Last Yellow (1999) as Len
- Kevin & Perry Go Large (2000) as Vicar
- Gangster No. 1 (2000) as Tommy
- Born Romantic (2000) as Barney
- The Most Fertile Man in Ireland (2000) as Da
- Shiner (2000) as Gibson
- Two Men Went to War (2002) as Sgt. Peter King
- Man Dancin' (2003) as D.I. Pancho Villers
- Blackball (2003) as Chairman Collins
- Trauma (2004) as Detective Constable Jackson
- Layer Cake (2004) as Jimmy Price
- Mangal Pandey: The Rising (2005) as Kent
- A Good Year (2006) as Sir Nigel
- Hot Fuzz (2007) as James Reaper
- Valkyrie (2008) as Field Marshal Wilhelm Keitel
- Running in Traffic (2009) as Bill Cullen
- Made in Dagenham (2010) as Monty Taylor
- 5 Days of War (2011) as Michael Stilton
- National Theatre Live: The Cherry Orchard (2011) as Firs
- Flying Blind (2012) as Victor
- Suspension of Disbelief (2012) as Bullock
- Closed Circuit (2013) as Cameron Fischer
- The Legend of Hercules (2014) as Lucius
- Maleficent (2014) as King Henry
- Film Stars Don't Die in Liverpool (2017) as Joe Turner
- Mr. Jones (2019) as David Lloyd George
- Born a King (2019) as Lord Curzon
- Official Secrets (2019) as Judge Hyam

=== Television ===
- City '68 (1967) as Len
- Ways with Words (1967)
- Boy Meets Girl (1969) as Tom Last
- Z-Cars (1970) as Togo Millington
- Softly, Softly: Task Force (1970–1972) as Ken Buckley / Ashley
- A Family at War (1971) as Charlie Collins
- Hadleigh (1971) as Andrew Matlock
- From a Bird's Eye View (1971) as Tim O'Donovan
- New Scotland Yard (1972) as David Collins
- Budgie (1972) as Inky Ballantine
- Achilles Heel (1973) as Gordon
- Crown Court (1973–1981) as John Tucker / Clive Jessup QC
- Village Hall (1975) as Lop
- Against the Crowd (1975) as Geoff Smailes
- Holding On (1977) as Ted Wheelwright
- The Velvet Glove (1977) as Townie
- Danger UXB (1979) as Sapper Salt / L / Corporal Salt
- Donkeys' Years (1980) as Bill Taylor
- Thérèse Raquin (1980) as Camille Raquin
- Enemy at the Door (1980) as Jack Foster
- Cribb (1980) as Francis Mostyn-Smith
- 'Tis Pity She's a Whore (1980) as Giovanni
- The Merchant of Venice (1980) as Gratiano
- Strangers (1980–1982) as Det. Chief Insp. Jim Lennard / Willie Bruce
- Brideshead Revisited (1981) as Sergeant Block
- The Bell (1982) as Nick Fawley
- Shine on Harvey Moon (1982–1985) as Harvey Moon
- Reilly: Ace of Spies (1983) as Lenin
- Heart of the High Country (1985) as Calvin Laird
- Dead Man's Folly (1986) as Detective Inspector Bland
- A Sort of Innocence (1987) as Eric Palmer
- Inspector Morse (1987) as Cedric Downes
- The Play on One: Normal Service (1988) as Peter
- Just Another Secret (1989) as Brosch
- Boon (1989) as Aiden Curtis
- Oranges Are Not the Only Fruit (1990) as Pastor Finch
- TECX (1990) as Colonel Braum
- Casualty (1990) as James Lawrence
- Dunrulin (1990) as Mr. Kneecap
- El C.I.D. (1990–1992) as Gus Mercer
- Chimera (1991) as Hennessey
- Bergerac (1990) as Gascoigne
- Van der Valk (1991) as Dirk Boutsen
- Murder Most Horrid (1991) as Inspector Salford
- The Young Indiana Jones Chronicles (1992) as Colonel Schmidt
- Between the Lines (1992) as D.C.I. Stubbs
- Minder (1993) as Walter
- Screen One (1993) as Douglas
- Lovejoy (1993) as Litvak
- Requiem Apache (1994) as Tony
- On Dangerous Ground (1996) as Brig. Charles Ferguson
- Heartbeat (1996) as Charlie Wallace
- The Tenant of Wildfell Hall (1996) as Reverend Millward
- Midnight Man (1997) as Brig. Charles Ferguson
- Get Well Soon (1997) as Inspector Trussler
- Our Mutual Friend (1998) as Silas Wegg
- Kavanagh QC (1998) as Roy Lawrence
- The Murder of Stephen Lawrence (1999) as Michael Mansfield QC
- Justice in Wonderland (2000) as George Carman
- Lady Audley's Secret (2000) as Sir Michael Audley
- The Ancients (2000) as William Blake
- The Sins (2000) as Gilbert
- Without Motive (2000) as DCS Derek Henderson
- NCS: Manhunt (2001) as Ricky Valesi
- Dalziel and Pascoe (2001) as Tommy Collingwood
- Night Flight (2002) as Ted Atwell
- Dickens (2002) as John Forster
- Believe Nothing (2002) as DI Aldiss
- Pollyanna (2003) as Mr. Pendleton
- Killing Hitler (2003) as Brigadier Sir Stewart Menzies
- Sparkling Cyanide (2003) as George Barton
- Bible Mysteries (2003)
- The Genius of Mozart (2004, three-part dramatised documentary) as Leopold Mozart
- M.I.T.: Murder Investigation Team (2005) as Ray Morgan
- Genghis Khan (2005) as Genghis Khan (voice)
- Rome (2005) as Pompey Magnus
- The Lavender List (2006) as Harold Wilson
- The Chatterley Affair (2006) as Older Keith
- Hustle (2006) as Francis Owen
- Hannibal (2006) as Narrator (voice)
- New Tricks (2006) as Lord McCready
- The Line of Beauty (2006) as Sir Maurice Tipper
- Afterlife (2006) as Stan Mundy
- Victoria Cross Heroes (2006) as Narrator
- Doc Martin (2006, 2022) as Terry Glasson
- Lilies (2007) as Mr. Pritchard
- Sinking of the Lusitania: Terror at Sea (2007) as Captain Turner
- The Last Detective (2007) as Gary Solway
- The Curry Club (2007) as Bob
- Heroes and Villains (2007) as General Carteaux
- Tess of the D'Urbervilles (2008) as Mr Clare
- Merlin (2008) as Aulfric
- Agatha Christie's Marple 'A Pocketful of Rye' (2008) as Rex Fortescue
- Spanish Flu: The Forgotten Fallen (2009) as MJ O'Loughlin
- Midsomer Murders (2010) as Jude Langham
- The Night Watch (2011) as Horace Mundy
- Upstairs Downstairs (2012) as Sergeant Ashworth
- Falcón (2012) as Alberto Montes
- Panto! (2012) as Jerry
- Death in Paradise (2013) as Father John
- In the Flesh (2013–2014) as Vicar Oddie
- 37 Days (2014) as John Burns
- Moving On (2014) as Mike
- A.D. The Bible Continues (2015) as Tiberius
- Neil Gaiman's Likely Stories (2016) as Dean Smith
- War & Peace (2016) as Uncle Mikhail
- The White Princess (2017) as John Morton
- Bancroft (2017) as Charlie Baverstock
- Inside No. 9 (2018) as Rupert (episode "And the Winner Is...")
- The Good Karma Hospital (2019) as Edmund Dalrymple
- Hatton Garden (2019) as Brian Reader
- Finding Alice (2021) as Gerry Walsh
- Strike (2022) as Dennis Creed

=== Radio ===
- The Legends of Robin Hood (2019) as Sheriff Hugh of Nottingham
- Grossman's War: Stalingrad (2019) as Stepan Spiridonov
- The Father (2016) as Andre
- The Interrogation (2012–present) as DS/DI Max Matthews
- The Moonstone (2011) as Sergeant Cuff
- The Hireling (2011) as the Narrator
- Grossman's War: Life and Fate (2011) as Stepan Spiridonov
- My Mad Grandad (2009) as Bernard Hill
- Tinker Tailor Soldier Spy (2009) as Inspector Mendel
- Call for the Dead (2009) as Inspector Mendel
- Left in Trust (2009)
- Hard Times (2007) as Thomas Gradgrind
- Answered Prayers (2004) as Walter
- The Winter's Tale (2004) as Polixenes
- The Chief Inspector Dover Mysteries (2003) as Chief Inspector Dover
- His Dark Materials: Northern Lights (2003) as Farder Coram
- Barry Lyndon (2003) as The Earl of Crabs
- Hopes and Desires: "The Non-Entity" (2003) as Dmitri
- Carmilla (2003) as Mountebank/General
- New Grub Street (2002) as Mr. Yule
- Little Dorrit (2001) as Mr. Merdle
- Hamlet (1999) as Claudius
- In the Chair (1998) as Jim Hardie
- The Barchester Chronicles (1997) as Crawley
- The Tin Drum (1996) as Matzerath
- Brighton Rock (1996) as Cubitt
- Cyrano de Bergerac (1996) as De Guiche
- Talking (1995) as The Judge
- It's Cold Outside (1995) as Ray
- Beau Geste (1994) as Sgt. Major LeJaune
- Only The Good Die Young (1992) as Stone
- Georgy Girl (1992) as James
- The Admirable Crichton (1986) as Crichton
- The White Devil (1986) as Duke Francisco
- Fear and Fear Again (1983) as Franz Kafka
- Busman's Honeymoon (1983) as Frank Crutchley
- The Dog It Was That Died (1982) as Hogben
- Loot as Hal
- Men of Violence (1979) as Blaze
- The Ruffian on the Stair (1964) as Wilson
- Boy Dudgeon (1963) as Boy Dudgeon

He has also performed a number of readings for BBC Radio.

== Awards and nominations ==
=== Theatre ===
Year	Award	Category	Work	Result	Ref.
1993	1993 Laurence Olivier Awards	Laurence Olivier Award for Best Actor	An Inspector Calls	Nominated	
2015	Critics’ Circle Theatre Award	Best Actor	The Father	Won	
2016	2016 Laurence Olivier Awards	Laurence Olivier Award for Best Actor	The Father	Won	
