= John Tillinger =

Theatre director and actor (born 1938)

- Born: Joachim Ferdinand Tillinger; 28 June 1938 (age 88); Tabriz, Iran
- Occupation: Actor/Theatre director
- Spouse: Dorothy Lyman (1971–1978; divorced)
- Children: 2 (including Emma Tillinger Koskoff)

John Tillinger (born June 28, 1938) is a theatre director and actor.

== Life and career ==
Joachim Ferdinand Tillinger was born in Tabriz, Iran. His father was German Jewish and his mother was Protestant. Tillinger was raised in England, where he was first exposed to the theatre.

He spent his early years on Broadway as an actor, appearing in A Day in the Death of Joe Egg (standby "Freddie", 1968), Othello ("Roderigo", 1970), Hay Fever ("Sandy Tyrell", 1970), and The Changing Room ("Colin Jagger", 1973).

Tillinger's first Broadway directing credit was Solomon's Child in 1982. Since then he has directed: Love Letters (1989) with Colleen Dewhurst and Jason Robards, The Price (1992) with Eli Wallach, Three Men on a Horse (1993) and The Sunshine Boys (1997), both with Jack Klugman and Tony Randall, Inherit the Wind (1996) with George C. Scott and Charles Durning, Night Must Fall (1999) with Matthew Broderick, Judgment at Nuremberg (2001) with George Grizzard and Maximilian Schell, Say Goodnight, Gracie (2002) with Frank Gorshin, and Absurd Person Singular (2005) with Paxton Whitehead and Sam Robards.

Tillinger's many Off-Broadway directing credits include Entertaining Mr Sloane (1981), After the Fall (1984), Loot (1986), What the Butler Saw (1989), The Lisbon Traviata (1989), Lips Together, Teeth Apart (1991), Sylvia (1995), and Jewtopia (2004).

He has directed numerous regional theatre productions. He directed The Wedding Banquet at the Village Theatre, Seattle, Washington, in 2003.

He was the literary consultant for the Long Wharf Theatre, New Haven, Connecticut from 1975 to 1997. Additionally, he was the associate artistic director at Long Wharf Theatre. He directed many plays at the Long Wharf Theatre, including This Story of Yours and Solomon's Child (1980), Another Country (1982), and most recently Paddywhack and Broken Glass (1994).

=== Personal ===
Tillinger was married to actress/director Dorothy Lyman from 1971 to 1978. They have two children, actor Sebastian Tillinger and producer Emma Tillinger.

== Filmography ==
Year	Title	Role	Notes
1970	Diary of a Mad Housewife		Uncredited
1980	Resurrection	Dr. Herron	
1982	A Little Sex	Sattler Sponsor	
1983	Lovesick	Play Director	
1987	Hello Again	T.V. Moderator	

== Awards and nominations ==
- 2001 Outer Critics Circle Award for Outstanding Director of a Play (Judgment at Nuremberg, nominee)
- 1991 Lucille Lortel Award for Outstanding Director (The Lisbon Traviata, winner)
- 1989 Lucille Lortel Award for Outstanding Director (Love Letters, winner)
- 1986 Tony Award for Best Direction of a Play (Loot, nominee)
- 1986 Drama Desk Award for Outstanding Director of a Play (It's Only a Play nominee) and (Loot, nominee)
- 1986 Outer Critics Circle Award for Best Direction of a Play (Loot, winner)
- 1982 Drama Desk Award for Outstanding Director of a Play (Entertaining Mr. Sloane, nominee)
