= The Erpingham Camp =

Reginald Marsh as Erpingham on cover Methuen 1967 first edition, under collected title with The Ruffian on the Stair

The Erpingham Camp (1966) is a 52-minute television play by Joe Orton, which was later performed on stage.

The play was originally produced by Associated-Rediffusion for inclusion in the Seven Deadly Sins series, representing pride. Directed by James Ormerod, it was broadcast on 27 June 1966. Originally made in monochrome on videotape, it survives as a 16mm film telerecording.

Orton subsequently contributed scripts for The Good and Faithful Servant and Funeral Games to the sequel Seven Deadly Virtues series - as faith and pride - but only Servant was actually included.

The Erpingham Camp was first performed on stage in June 1967, as part of a double bill with The Ruffian on the Stair titled Crimes of Passion at the Royal Court Theatre, in a production by Peter Gill. It has been staged on occasion ever since.

== Plot ==
It is a farce in which a respectable group of English campers are innocently enjoying themselves at a 1960s holiday camp before catastrophe strikes and they find themselves fighting against the camp's demonic, rigid, moral and patronising manager, "Erpingham". The play is loosely based on The Bacchae by Euripides.

== Original cast ==
- Reginald Marsh - Erpingham
- Peter Reeves - Riley
- Angela Pleasence - Eileen
- Faith Kent - Lou
- Charles Rea - Ted
- John Forgeham - Kenny
- Peter Honri - W. E. Harrison
- Avril Fane - Jessie Mason
- Peter Evans - Padre

== Royal Court cast ==
- Bernard Gallagher - Erpingham
- Roddy Maude Roxby - Riley
- Pauline Collins - Lou
- Johnny Wade - Ted
- Yvonne Antrobus - Eileen
- Michael Standing - Kenny
- Roger Booth - Padre
- Ken Wynne - W. E. Harrison
- Josie Bradley - Jessie Mason
- Andre Evans - Redcoats and Campers
- Rosemary McHale - " "
- Peter John - " "
- Malcolm Reid - " "
