= Entertaining Mr Sloane (film) =

- Original poster
- Directed by: Douglas Hickox
- Written by: Clive Exton
- Based on: play by Joe Orton
- Produced by: Douglas Kentish
- Starring: Beryl Reid; Harry Andrews; Peter McEnery; Alan Webb
- Cinematography: Wolfgang Suschitzky
- Edited by: John Trumper
- Music by: Georgie Fame
- Production company: Canterbury Film Productions
- Distributed by: Anglo-Amalgamated Film Distributors Ltd. Warner-Pathé (UK)
- Release date: 1 April 1970 (UK)
- Running time: 94 minutes
- Country: United Kingdom
- Language: English
- Budget: £97,000

Entertaining Mr Sloane is a 1970 British black comedy film directed by Douglas Hickox. The screenplay by Clive Exton is based on the 1964 play of the same title by Joe Orton. This was the second adaptation of the play, the first having been developed for British television and broadcast by ITV on 15 July 1968.

In the film, a lonely woman invites a recent acquaintance to become her lodger and her lover. Her brother likes him as well, and the new arrival plays the siblings against each other. But the lodger is eventually blackmailed into becoming both their prisoner and their shared lover, in a ménage à trois.

== Plot ==
Murder, homosexuality, bisexuality, nymphomania, and sadism are among the themes of this black comedy focusing on a brother and sister who become involved with a young, sexy, amoral drifter with a mysterious past.

Kath is a lonely middle-aged woman living in the London suburbs with her aging father, Kemp, referred to as DaDa. When she meets Mr Sloane sunbathing and exercising on a grave in the cemetery near her home, she invites him to become a lodger. Soon after he accepts her offer, Kath seduces him. Her closeted brother, Ed, makes him the chauffeur, complete with a tight leather uniform, of his pink 1959 Pontiac Parisienne convertible. Kemp recognizes Sloane as the man who killed his boss years before and stabs him in the leg with a gardening tool.

Sloane takes delight in playing brother against sister and tormenting the elderly man. He gets Kath pregnant and a jealous Ed warns him to stay away from her. When Mr Sloane murders Kemp to protect his secret, they blackmail him by threatening to report him to the police unless he agrees to participate in a ménage à trois, in which he becomes not only a sexual partner but their prisoner as well.

== Cast ==
- Beryl Reid as Kath
- Peter McEnery as Sloane
- Harry Andrews as Ed
- Alan Webb as Kemp

== Production ==
=== Background and financing ===
Douglas Hickox was a TV commercials director who wanted to get into feature films. He and Doug Kentish set up a company called Canterbury Films which mostly made commercials. They had to buy the rights off a German company. Hickox admitted "Orton is not a subject I would have picked" normally, but "it was my opportunity."

They spent two years trying to raise finance for what would be Canterbury's first feature. Producer Kentish said casting was "difficult" but they could afford to pay the actors "a little more" as there were only four, and there were only a few locations.

Finance was raised in part from Anglo-Amalgamated. It was one of the first of a slate of films under the supervision of Nat Cohen who had set up a unit at EMI Films.

=== Filming ===
Filming commenced on 18 August 1969, with three weeks of location work and four weeks in the studio. The film was produced at Intertel Studios in Wembley and on location at Brockley, at East Dulwich, and at the lodge in Camberwell Old Cemetery in Honor Oak.

=== Music ===
The theme song was sung by Georgie Fame. Fame released it as the B-side of his 1970 single "Somebody Stole My Thunder".

== Release ==
Attended by Princess Margaret, the Royal World Premiere took place on 1 April 1970 at the Carlton Cinema in London.

Beryl Reid later wrote in her memoirs that "though it wasn’t an immediate success commercially, Entertaining Mr Sloane has become a cult film: everybody tries to get videos of it, which is quite surprising. It has always been my favourite film and certainly it was brilliantly adapted for the screen from Joe Orton’s play by Clive Exton, with Douglas Hickox doing a marvellous job."

=== Critical reception ===
Variety said the film "blends morbid humor, an obsession with sex, and an underlying pathos and result is interest that is always held. It’s no detraction from the rest of the cast to say that it is firmly Beryl Reid's picture."

The Guardian felt it was "a pretty coarse version of the play which persists in rubbing our noses in what Orton hinted at."

The Los Angeles Times called it "an outrageous, hilarious, pitch black English comedy."

Roger Greenspun of The New York Times observed, "I think that the play's real interest lies precisely in its grotesque avoidance of the depths with which the movie is so vividly familiar. But in most of its particulars the film succeeds—with a superb cast, Douglas Hickox's inventive and generally restrained direction, and a screenplay by Clive Exton that . . . opens up the action mainly to enlarge the characterization of Ed, a real virtue if only for allowing more time and scope to the wonderful Harry Andrews. To a degree the drama has been realized on film . . . and this seems worth the effort and the occasional misdirections, and the nervous discomfort that is likely to be an audience's most immediate response."

Time Out thought the original play "loses much of its savoury charm in this movie version. Clive Exton's script opens out the play conventionally, to little effect, and Hickox's direction shows little flair for farce in general or Orton in particular."

Filmink called it "a brave, artistic choice for [Nat] Cohen, another of the (many) rebuttals that he made “safe” movies."

Veteran actor Dudley Sutton originated the role of Sloane in the premiere London and New York stage productions, and was friends with Orton. He was sharply critical of the film version in a 2016 interview with Dr Emma Parker of the University of Leicester, and complained strongly about what he saw as the film's weak presentation of Sloane's character:

"The thing about Sloane is that he's ... lumpen ... he's not a lightweight. When they made that atrocious film ... God rest 'em ... they made Sloane a lightweight, and he isn't like that. Sloane is kind of monosyllabic, and he's heavy, he's lumpen ... leaden ... he's a geez."

=== Home media ===
The film was released on DVD by Cinema Club on 20 June 2005.

In May 2025, Severin Films will release a restored 2K resolution version of the film, with bonus material, on Blu-ray DVD.
