= Tom Smith (playwright) =

American dramatist

Tom Smith (born in 1969 in Rochelle, Illinois) is an American playwright, theatre director, and professor of theatre arts. Originally trained as an improvisational comedian, Smith founded Walla Walla TheatreSports in 1988.

Smith's published plays include Drinking Habits, Drinking Habits 2: Caught in the Act, The Odyssey, The Pathmaker, A Christmas Carol, Dangerous (a contemporary gay treatment of Les Liaisons Dangereuses), Gray, and Marguerita's Secret Diary in addition to edited versions of Much Ado About Nothing, The Comedy of Errors, The Two Gentlemen of Verona and Love's Labour's Lost. Additionally, he has many plays published by YouthPLAYS, including Johnny and Sally Ann: the true-life tall-tales of Johnny Appleseed and Sally Ann Thunder Ann Whirlwind, which ran for 2 years with LA's traveling company Enrichment Works; ESL, The Wild and Wacky Rhyming Stories of Miss Henrietta Humpledowning and 'What Comes Around.... Unpublished plays receiving productions include Aunt Raini, which received a reading at Caldwell Theatre in Boca Raton and its professional premiere at Minnesota Jewish Theatre Company; Anna's Mother; Love's Memory: Eurydice and Orpheus;Small Things, Every Day; and various 10-minute plays. In January, 2009, Kendall Hunt Publishing published his book on long and short form improvisation, The Other Blocking: Teaching and Performing Improvisation.

His plays have won national and regional awards, including the Robert J. Pickering Award for Excellence in Playwriting, the ATHE Playworks Award, the Orlin R. Corey Outstanding Regional Playwright Award, and the Richard Odlin Award.

Smith has directed plays staged in Kansas City, Missouri; Seattle, Washington; Creede, Colorado; Forestburgh, NY; and Las Cruces, New Mexico.
