= Gordon Davidson (director) =

American stage- and film director (1933–2016)

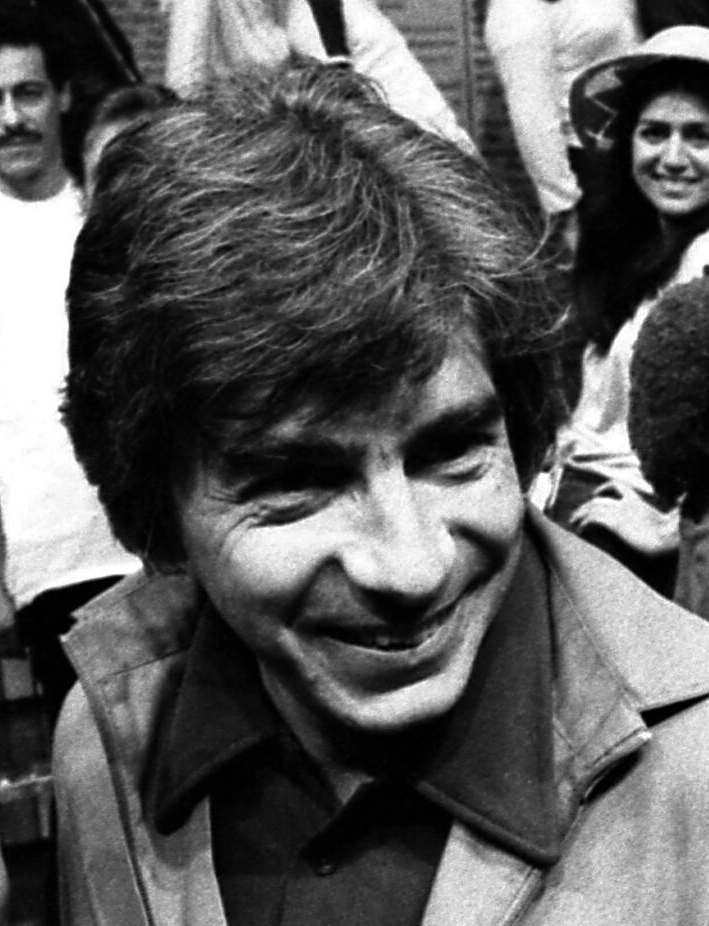
- Davidson in 1978
- Born: May 7, 1933; Brooklyn, New York, U.S.
- Died: October 2, 2016 (aged 83); Los Angeles, California, U.S.
- Education: Cornell University; Case Western Reserve University
- Occupations: Stage director, film director, philanthropist
- Spouse: Judith Swiller (m. 1959)
- Children: Adam Davidson; Rachel Davidson Janger
- Parents: Joseph Davidson; Alice Gordon
- Awards: Tony Award

Gordon Davidson (May 7, 1933 – October 2, 2016) was an American stage and film director and the founding artistic director of Center Theatre Group in Los Angeles.

== Early life ==
Gordon Davidson was born on May 7, 1933, in Brooklyn, New York. He graduated from Cornell University in 1956, studying electrical engineering, and received a master's in theater from Case Western Reserve University in 1957.

He described his Jewish faith and heritage: “My paternal grandfather, born in a small town near Kiev, was Orthodox; my father was Conservative; and I’m Reform.”

== Career ==
Moving to Los Angeles in 1963 to serve as Director of the Theatre Group based at University of California, Los Angeles (UCLA), Gordon Davidson was selected in 1967 to be artistic director of the then new Mark Taper Forum and staged as the inaugural show The Devils followed by In the Matter of J. Robert Oppenheimer.

Davidson directed over 40 plays, including The Trial of the Catonsville Nine and Murderous Angels in 1971, Children of a Lesser God in 1982 and Stuff Happens in 2005. He also directed the film version The Trial of the Catonsville Nine in 1972 and a TV film called The Trial of Lee Harvey Oswald in 1977. According to his Los Angeles Times obituary, Davidson produced over 300 plays for Center Theatre Group.

In 1977, Gordon Davidson earned a Best Director Tony Award for his staging on Broadway of The Shadow Box, which he first staged at Mark Taper Forum in Los Angeles. The Taper won the Tony that year for Outstanding Regional Theater.

In 2003, he made a brief cameo appearance as himself, directing a play starring James Earl Jones and Jack McFarland, in an episode of Will & Grace.

Until 2005, he worked as artistic director for the Center Theatre Group in Los Angeles. He is a fellow of the American Academy of Arts and Sciences.

== Philanthropy ==
Together with dancer and producer Felisa Vanoff (1925–2014), he established the Salon at the Taper, an annual charity dinner in honor of a lyricist. Each year, the event was hosted by Michael Feinstein and took place in Los Angeles, California. The proceeds went to Nick's Tix, a non-profit organization selling low-cost tickets to students, seniors and the disabled for all performances at the Los Angeles Music Center.

== Personal life and death ==
He was married to Judi Davidson. Their son is the director Adam Davidson. He died on October 2, 2016. He is interred at Hillside Memorial Park in Culver City, CA.

== Honors ==
In 2018, the Stage Directors and Choreographers Foundation established an award in Davidson's name. The award is given annually to a director or choreographer in honor of lifetime achievement and distinguished service in the regional theater.
