= Barry Broadfoot =

Canadian journalist (1926–2003)

Barry Samuel Broadfoot, CM (January 21, 1926 – November 28, 2003) was a Canadian journalist and oral historian born in Winnipeg, Manitoba.

== Biography ==
Broadfoot's first job at 17 years old was as a cub reporter who had to go to the homes of men killed in action in World War II and obtain photographs to run along with their death notices. At 18, he joined the Canadian Army and spent the next two years in the infantry. He then returned to journalism as a reporter for the Vancouver Sun, where he worked until 1971.

Taking up a new career as a freelance social historian, Broadfoot interviewed Canadian subjects about their memories of their lives during specific historical periods such as the Great Depression and World War II. Ten Lost Years, his first in this series of books, published in 1973, was an oral history of the experiences of Canadians during the Great Depression. He collected the experiences, via taped interviews, during the course of travelling across Canada four times. The collected interviews became the basis of Ten Lost Years, a play written by Jack Winter, with music by Cedric Smith. The play, directed by George Luscombe, premiered in Toronto, toured Canada in 1974 and continues to be performed.

In 1997, he was made a Member of the Order of Canada, Canada's highest civilian honour.

In 1998, Broadfoot suffered a stroke, which blinded him and impaired his memory. He died in Nanaimo, British Columbia, on November 28, 2003.

== Selected bibliography ==
- Ten Lost Years 1973 (Doubleday)
- Six War Years 1975
- The Pioneer Years 1976
- Years of Sorrow, Years of Shame 1977
- My Own Years 1983
- The Veterans' Years 1985
- The Immigrant Years. Douglas & McIntyre, Vancouver 1986
- Next-Year Country 1988
- Ordinary Russians 1989
