= Sheila Ballantine =

British actress (1928–2026)

- Born: Sheila Mavis Ballantine; 14 October 1928; Hackney, London, England
- Died: 24 July 2026 (aged 97)
- Occupation: Actress
- Years active: 1947–2011

Sheila Mavis Ballantine (14 October 1928 – 24 July 2026) was a British stage and television actress with a career spanning eight decades.

== Background ==
Sheila Mavis Ballantine was born in Hackney, London on 14 October 1928. She was the only child of Jack Ballantine, a telephone wires fixer during World War I and later a senior Post Office executive, and his wife, Kate (née Flindall), a milliner.

Ballantine died on 24 July 2026, aged 97.

== Career ==
Ballantine made her professional debut in 1947 with a role in The Snow Queen directed by Michel Saint-Denis at the Old Vic.
