= Joe Orton =

English playwright and author (1933–1967)

- Orton in 1964
- Born: John Kingsley Orton; 1 January 1933; Leicester, England
- Died: 9 August 1967 (aged 34); Islington, London, England
- Cause of death: Murder by bludgeoning
- Education: Royal Academy of Dramatic Art
- Occupations: Playwright; author
- Years active: 1959–1967
- Partner: Kenneth Halliwell (1951–1967)

John Kingsley "Joe" Orton (1 January 1933 – 9 August 1967), was an English playwright, author, and diarist.

His public career, from 1964 until his murder in 1967 by his partner, was short but highly influential. During this brief period he shocked, outraged, and amused audiences with his scandalous black comedies. The adjective Ortonesque refers to work characterised by a similarly dark yet farcical cynicism.

== Early life ==
Orton was born on 1 January 1933 in Leicester, the son of William Arthur Orton and Elsie Mary Orton (née Bentley). William worked for Leicester County Borough Council as a gardener and Elsie worked in the local footwear industry until tuberculosis cost her a lung. At the time of Joe's birth, William and Mary were living with William's family at 261 Avenue Road Extension in Clarendon Park, Leicester. Joe's younger brother, Douglas, was born in 1935. That year, the Ortons moved to 9 Fayrhurst Road on the Saffron Lane Estate, a council estate. Orton's younger sisters, Marilyn and Leonie, were born in 1939 and 1944, respectively.

Orton attended Marriot Road Primary School but failed the eleven-plus exam after extended bouts of asthma, and so took a secretarial course at Clark's College in Leicester from 1945 to 1947. He began working as a junior clerk for £3 a week.

Orton became interested in performing in theatre around 1949 and joined a number of dramatic societies, including the Leicester Dramatic Society. While working on amateur productions he was determined to improve his appearance and physique, buying bodybuilding courses, taking elocution lessons. He was accepted for a scholarship at the Royal Academy of Dramatic Art (RADA) in November 1950, and he left the East Midlands for London. His entrance into RADA was delayed until May 1951 by appendicitis.

Orton met Kenneth Halliwell at RADA in 1951 and moved into a West Hampstead flat with him and two other students that June. Halliwell was seven years older than Orton; they quickly formed a strong relationship and became lovers.

After graduating, both Orton and Halliwell went into regional repertory work: Orton spent four months in Ipswich as an assistant stage manager; Halliwell in Llandudno, Wales. Both returned to London and began to write together. They collaborated on a number of unpublished novels (often imitating Ronald Firbank) with no success at gaining publication. The rejection of their great hope, The Last Days of Sodom, in 1957 led them to solo works. Orton wrote his last novel, The Vision of Gombold Proval (posthumously published as Head to Toe), in 1959. He later drew on these manuscripts for ideas; many show glimpses of his stage-play style.

Confident of their "specialness," Orton and Halliwell refused to work for long periods. They subsisted on Halliwell's money (and unemployment benefits) and were forced to follow an ascetic life to restrict their spending to £5 a week. From 1957 to 1959, they worked in six-month stretches at Cadbury's to raise money for a new flat; they moved into a small, austere flat at 25 Noel Road in Islington in 1959.

== Crimes and punishment ==
A lack of serious work led them to amuse themselves with pranks and hoaxes. Orton created the second self "Edna Welthorpe", an elderly theatre snob, whom he later revived to stir controversy over his plays. Orton chose the name as an allusion to Terence Rattigan's archetypal playgoer "Aunt Edna".

From January 1959, Orton and Halliwell began to surreptitiously remove books from several local public libraries and modify the cover art or the blurbs before returning them. A volume of poems by Sir John Betjeman was returned to the library with a new dust jacket featuring a photograph of a nearly naked, heavily tattooed middle-aged man. The couple decorated their flat with many of the prints. They were discovered and prosecuted. On 30 April 1962 they pleaded guilty to two joint charges of theft, the first relating to 36 books taken from Islington Public Library in Essex Road, and the second to 36 books taken from a branch of the same library in Holloway Road. At a further hearing in May 1962 they pleaded guilty to further joint charges of theft and criminal damage, and were sentenced to prison for six months, with fines of £2 each. The incident was reported in the Daily Mirror as "Gorilla in the Roses", illustrated with the altered Collins Guide to Roses by Bertram Park.

Orton and Halliwell felt that the sentence was unduly harsh "because we were queers". Prison was a crucial formative experience; the isolation from Halliwell allowed Orton to break free of him creatively, and he saw what he considered the corruption, priggishness, and double standards of a purportedly liberal country. As Orton put it, "It affected my attitude towards society. Before I had been vaguely conscious of something rotten somewhere, prison crystallised this. The old whore society really lifted up her skirts and the stench was pretty foul.... Being in the nick brought detachment to my writing. I wasn't involved any more. And suddenly it worked." The book covers Orton and Halliwell vandalised have since become a valued part of the Islington Local History Centre collection. Some are exhibited in the Islington Museum.

A collection of the book covers is available online.

== Playwright ==
=== Breakthrough ===
Orton began writing plays in 1959 with Fred and Madge; The Visitors followed two years later. In 1963, the BBC paid £65 for the radio play The Ruffian on the Stair, broadcast on 31 August 1964. It was substantially rewritten for the stage in 1966.

He had completed Entertaining Mr Sloane by the time Ruffian was broadcast. He sent a copy to theatre agent Peggy Ramsay in December 1963. It premiered at the New Arts Theatre in Westminster 6 May 1964, produced by Michael Codron. Reviews ranged from praise to outrage. The Times described it as making "the blood boil more than any other British play in the last 10 years".

Entertaining Mr Sloane lost money in its three-week run, but critical praise from playwright Terence Rattigan, who invested £3,000 in it, ensured its survival. The play was transferred to Wyndham's Theatre in the West End at the end of June and to the Queen's Theatre in October. Sloane tied for first in the Variety Critics' Poll for Best New Play and Orton came second for Most Promising Playwright. Within a year, Sloane was performed in New York, Spain, Israel, and Australia as well as made into a film (after Orton's death) and a television play.

=== Loot ===
Orton's next performed work was Loot. The first draft was written from June to October 1964 and was called Funeral Games, a title Orton dropped at Halliwell's suggestion but later reused. The play is a wild parody of detective fiction, adding the blackest farce and jabs at established ideas on death, the police, religion, and justice. Orton offered the play to Codron in October 1964 and it underwent sweeping rewrites before it was judged fit for the West End.

Codron had manoeuvred Orton into meeting his colleague Kenneth Williams in August 1964. (Note: In the summer of 1966, Orton and Halliwell would take Williams on holiday, to Tangiers in Morocco, which in the 1960s was a haven for gay men.) Orton reworked Loot with Williams in mind for Truscott. His other inspiration for the role was DS Harold Challenor. With the success of Sloane, Loot was hurried into pre-production despite its flaws. Rehearsals began in January 1965, with plans for a six-week tour culminating in a West End debut. The play opened in Cambridge on 1 February to scathing reviews.

Orton, disagreeing with director Peter Wood over the plot, produced 133 pages of new material to replace, or add to, the original 90. But the play received poor reviews in Brighton, Oxford, Bournemouth, Manchester, and finally Wimbledon in mid-March. Discouraged, Orton and Halliwell went on an 80-day holiday in Tangiers.

In January 1966, Loot was revived, with Oscar Lewenstein taking up an option. Before his production, it had a short run (11–23 April) at the University Theatre, Manchester. Orton's growing experience led him to cut over 600 lines, raising the tempo and improving the characters' interactions. Directed by Braham Murray, the play garnered more favourable reviews. Lewenstein put the London production in a "sort of Off-West End theatre," the Jeannetta Cochrane Theatre in Bloomsbury, under the direction of Charles Marowitz.

Orton clashed with Marowitz, although the additional cuts further improved the play. This production was first staged in London on 27 September 1966, to rave reviews. Ronald Bryden in The Observer asserted that it had "established Orton's niche in English drama". Loot moved to the Criterion Theatre in November where it ran for 342 performances. This time it won several awards, and Orton sold the film rights for £25,000. Loot, when performed on Broadway in 1968, repeated the failure of Sloane, and the film version of the play was not a success when it surfaced in 1970.

=== Later works ===
Over the next ten months, he revised The Ruffian on the Stair and The Erpingham Camp for the stage as a double called Crimes of Passion, wrote Funeral Games, the screenplay Up Against It for the Beatles, and his final full-length play, What the Butler Saw.

The Erpingham Camp, Orton's take on The Bacchae, written through mid-1965 and offered to Associated-Rediffusion in October of that year, was broadcast on 27 June 1966 as the "pride" segment in their series Seven Deadly Sins. The Good and Faithful Servant was a transitional work for Orton. A one-act television play, it was completed by June 1964 but first broadcast by Associated-Rediffusion on 6 April 1967, representing "faith" in the series Seven Deadly Virtues.

Orton rewrote Funeral Games four times from July to November 1966. Also intended for The Seven Deadly Virtues, it dealt with charity – Christian charity – in a confusion of adultery and murder. Rediffusion did not use the play; instead, it was made as one of the first productions of the new ITV company Yorkshire Television, and broadcast posthumously in the Playhouse series on 26 August 1968, five weeks after an adaptation of Mr Sloane.

In March 1967, Orton and Halliwell had intended another extended holiday in Libya, but they returned home after one day because the only hotel accommodation they could find was a boat that had been converted into a hotel/nightclub. They spent May and June holidaying in Tangier, Morocco, where they frequently engaged in sex with teenage boys.

Orton's once controversial farce What The Butler Saw was staged in the West End in 1969, more than 18 months after his death. It opened in March at the Queen's Theatre with Sir Ralph Richardson, Coral Browne, Stanley Baxter and Hayward Morse.

== Murder ==
On 9 August 1967, Halliwell bludgeoned to death the 34-year-old Orton at their home in Noel Road with nine hammer blows to the head. Halliwell then killed himself with an overdose of Nembutal.

In 1970, The Sunday Times reported that four days before the murder, Orton had told a friend that he wanted to end his relationship with Halliwell, but did not know how to go about it. It has since been revealed in his diaries that said friend was Scottish actress Adrienne Corri.

Halliwell's doctor, Douglas Ismay, spoke to him by telephone three times on the day of the murder, and had arranged for him to see a psychiatrist the following morning. The last call was at 10 o'clock, during which Halliwell told the doctor, "Don't worry, I'm feeling better now. I'll go and see the doctor tomorrow morning."

According to Richard Brooks, arts editor of The Sunday Times in 2017, two of Orton's colleagues, producer Richard Curson Smith and actor Kenneth Cranham, said Peter Willes, who had produced two Orton plays for television, was also in love with Orton. It was he who had suggested Halliwell see Dr Ismay, but with a view to his being committed to a mental hospital, thereby separating him from Orton. They blame Willes for being largely responsible for Orton's death.

Halliwell had felt increasingly threatened and isolated by Orton's success, and had come to rely on antidepressants and barbiturates. The bodies were discovered the following morning when a chauffeur arrived to take Orton to a meeting with director Richard Lester to discuss filming options on Up Against It. Halliwell left a suicide note: "If you read his diary, all will be explained. KH PS: Especially the latter part." This is presumed to be a reference to Orton's description of his promiscuity; the diary contains numerous incidents of cottaging in public lavatories and other casual sexual encounters with teenagers, including with rent boys on holiday in North Africa. The diaries have since been published. The last diary entry is dated 1 August 1967 and ends abruptly in midsentence at the end of the page, suggesting that some pages may be missing.

Orton was cremated at the Golders Green Crematorium, his maroon cloth-draped coffin was brought into the west chapel to a recording of the Beatles' song "A Day in the Life". Harold Pinter read the eulogy, concluding with "He was a bloody marvellous writer." Orton's agent Peggy Ramsay described Orton's relatives as "the little people in Leicester", leaving a cold, nondescript note and bouquet at the funeral on their behalf.

At the suggestion of Halliwell's family, Peggy Ramsay asked Orton's brother Douglas if Orton and Halliwell's ashes could be mixed. Douglas agreed, "As long as nobody hears about it in Leicester." The mixed ashes were scattered in section 3-C of the Garden of Remembrance at Golders Green. There is no memorial.

== Biography and film, radio, TV ==
John Lahr's biography of Orton, entitled Prick Up Your Ears (a title Orton himself had considered using), was published in 1978 by Bloomsbury. A 1987 film adaptation of the same name was released based on Orton's diaries and on Lahr's research. Directed by Stephen Frears, it stars Gary Oldman as Orton, Alfred Molina as Halliwell, and Vanessa Redgrave as Peggy Ramsay. Alan Bennett wrote the screenplay. Katrina Sheldon was the sound editor.

Carlos Be wrote a play about Orton and Halliwell's last days, 25 Noel Road: A Genius Like Us, first performed in 2001. It received its New York premiere in 2012, produced by Repertorio Español.

Joe Orton was played by the actor Kenny Doughty in the 2006 BBC film Kenneth Williams: Fantabulosa!, starring Michael Sheen as Kenneth Williams.

Leonie Orton Barnett's memoir I Had It in Me was published in 2016, containing new information about her brother's life growing up in Leicester.

In 2017, film-maker Chris Shepherd made an animated short inspired by Orton's Edna Welthorpe letters, 'Yours Faithfully, Edna Welthorpe (Mrs)', starring Alison Steadman as Edna.

Two archive recordings of Orton are known to survive: a short BBC radio interview first transmitted in August 1967, and a video recording, held by the British Film Institute, of his appearance on Eamonn Andrews' ITV chat show, transmitted on 23 April 1967.

== Legacy ==
A pedestrian concourse in front of the Curve theatre in Leicester has been renamed Orton Square.

In July 2019, Dr Emma Parker, professor at the University of Leicester and an Orton expert, began a campaign to honour him with a statue in his native city, Leicester. The campaign enjoyed prominent support from the acting community, including from Sheila Hancock, Kenneth Cranham, Ian McKellen and Alec Baldwin. Although the fundraising target was met, the project was cancelled in 2022, with the organisers citing pandemic challenges and changing attitudes to statues in Britain. Orton's sister Leonie stated that Orton's history of sexual encounters with underage boys was a major factor in the failure of the project.

== Plays ==
- Fred and Madge (written 1959, published 2001)
- The Visitors (written 1961, published 2001)
- The Ruffian on the Stair (first performance 1964) Radio play
- Entertaining Mr Sloane (first performance 1964)
- Loot (first performance 1965)
- The Erpingham Camp (first performance 1966)
- The Good and Faithful Servant (first performance 1967)
- Funeral Games (first performance 1968)
- What the Butler Saw (first performance 1969)
- Up Against It (screenplay)

== Novels ==
- Head to Toe (published 1971)
- Between Us Girls (published 2001)
- Lord Cucumber and The Boy Hairdresser (co-written with Halliwell) (published 1999)

== Sources ==
- Banham, Martin (ed.), 1998. The Cambridge Guide to Theatre, Cambridge: Cambridge University Press. ISBN 0-521-43437-8
- Bigsby, C. W. E., 1982. Joe Orton. Contemporary Writers series. London: Routledge. ISBN 0-416-31690-5
- Burke, Arthur, 2001. Laughter in the Dark – The Plays of Joe Orton, Billericay, Essex: Greenwich Exchange. ISBN 1-871551-56-0
- Charney, Maurice. 1984. Joe Orton. Grove Press Modern Dramatists series. NY: Grove Press. ISBN 0-394-54241-X
- Coppa, Francesca (ed.), 2002. Joe Orton: A Casebook. Casebooks on Modern Dramatists series. London: Routledge. ISBN 0-8153-3627-6
- Dent, Alan, 2018. Entertaining Hypocrites: The Playwriting of Joe Orton, Penniless Press Publications. ISBN 978-0-244-09226-9
- DiGaetani, John Louis, 2008. Stages of Struggle: Modern Playwrights and Their Psychological Inspirations, Jefferson: McFarland. ISBN 0-7864-3157-1
- Fox, James, 1970. "The Life and Death of Joe Orton", The Sunday Times Magazine, 22 November.
- Lahr, John, 1978. Prick Up Your Ears: The Biography of Joe Orton, London: Bloomsbury. ISBN 0-7475-6014-5.
- --- 1976: Joe Orton: The Complete Plays, London: Methuen. ISBN 0413346102
- --- (ed.), 1986. The Orton Diaries, by Joe Orton. London: Methuen. ISBN 0-306-80733-5.
- ---. 1989. Diary of a Somebody, London: Methuen. ISBN 0-413-61180-9.
- Orton, Leonie, 2016. I Had It in Me, Leicester: Quirky Press ISBN 978-0-992-8834-2-3
- Ruskino, Susan, 1995. Joe Orton. Twayne's English Authors series. Boston: Twayne. ISBN 0-8057-7034-8.
- Shepherd, Simon, 1989. Because We're Queers: The Life and Crimes of Joe Orton and Kenneth Haliwell, London: Gay Men's Press: 1989: ISBN 978-0-85449-090-5
