= What the Butler Saw (play) =

Play written by Joe Orton

- original window card, Whitehall Theatre, 1975
- Original language: English
- Written by: Joe Orton
- Subject: a couple succeed in extracurricular seductions and frantically try to hide their conquests
- Genre: Farce
- Setting: an examination room in a private clinic

Premiere
- Date: 27 January 1969
- Place: Queen's Theatre; London, England

What the Butler Saw is a two-act farce written by the English playwright Joe Orton. He began work on the play in 1966 and completed it in July 1967, one month before his death. It opened at the Queen's Theatre in London on 5 March 1969. Orton's final play, it was the second to be performed after his death, following Funeral Games in 1968.

== Plot summary ==
Characters

- Dr Prentice
- Geraldine Barclay
- Mrs Prentice
- Nicholas Beckett
- Dr Rance
- Sergeant Match

The play consists of two acts – though the action is continuous – and revolves around a Dr Prentice, a psychiatrist attempting to seduce his attractive prospective secretary, Geraldine Barclay. The play opens with the doctor examining Geraldine in a job interview, during which he persuades her to undress. The situation becomes more intense when Mrs Prentice enters, causing the doctor to hide Geraldine behind a curtain.

His wife, however, is also being seduced and blackmailed, by Nicholas Beckett. She therefore promises Nicholas the post as secretary, which adds further confusion, including Nicholas, Geraldine and a police officer dressing as members of the opposite sex.

Dr Prentice's clinic is also faced with a government inspection, led by Dr Rance, which reveals the chaos in the clinic. Dr Rance talks about how he will use the situation to develop a new book: "The final chapters of my book are knitting together: incest, buggery, outrageous women and strange love-cults catering for depraved appetites. All the fashionable bric-a-brac." A penis ("the missing parts of Sir Winston Churchill") is held aloft in the climactic scene.

== Productions ==
=== Premiere ===
The original production, having toured briefly from January 1969, opened in the West End at the Queen's Theatre on 5 March. Presented by Lewenstein-Delfont Productions Ltd and H. M. Tennent Ltd, it was directed by Robert Chetwyn and designed by Hutchinson Scott.

Cast

- Stanley Baxter – Dr Prentice
- Julia Foster – Geraldine Barclay
- Coral Browne – Mrs Prentice
- Hayward Morse – Nicholas Beckett
- Ralph Richardson – Dr Rance
- Peter Bayliss – Sergeant Match

=== Stage revivals ===
1) A revival at London's Royal Court Theatre, directed by Lindsay Anderson, opened in July 1975 and transferred to the Whitehall Theatre the following month.

Cast

- Michael Medwin – Dr Prentice
- Jane Carr – Geraldine Barclay
- Betty Marsden – Mrs Prentice
- Kevin Lloyd – Nicholas Beckett
- Valentine Dyall – Dr Rance
- Brian Glover – Sergeant Match

2) A revival in April 1977 at Leicester's Phoenix Arts Centre was directed by Antonia Bird. She realised that the last line of the play had been given to the wrong character, and by referring to Orton's handwritten manuscript was able to give it back to the correct character.

3) A revival at London's Hampstead Theatre, directed by John Tillinger, opened in November 1990 and transferred to the Wyndham's Theatre in January 1991.

Cast

- Clive Francis – Dr Prentice
- Camille Coduri – Geraldine Barclay
- Sheila Gish – Mrs Prentice
- Ben Porter – Nicholas Beckett
- Joseph Maher – Dr Rance
- Gary Olsen – Sergeant Match

4) The play was revived in 1994 at The Royal Exchange Theatre, directed by Robert Delamere, and ran from 7 April to 7 May.

Cast

- David Horovitch – Dr Prentice
- Kate Winslet – Geraldine Barclay
- Deborah Norton – Mrs Prentice
- Neil Stuke – Nicholas Beckett
- Trevor Baxter – Dr Rance
- Billy Hartman – Sergeant Match

5) In 1995, a Royal National Theatre production of the play premiered in February at the RNT's Lyttelton Theatre and then went on tour prior to returning to the RNT repertoire. Phyllida Lloyd directed the play.

Cast

- John Alderton – Dr Prentice
- Debra Gillett – Geraldine Barclay
- Nicola Pagett – Mrs Prentice
- David Tennant – Nicholas Beckett
- Richard Wilson – Dr Rance
- Jeremy Swift – Sergeant Match

6) There was a further revival in 2012 at the Vaudeville Theatre, directed by Sean Foley, Casting by Anne Vosser, which ran from 16 May to 25 August.

Cast

- Tim McInnerny – Dr Prentice
- Georgia Tennant – Geraldine Barclay
- Samantha Bond – Mrs Prentice
- Nick Hendrix – Nicholas Beckett
- Omid Djalili – Dr Rance
- Jason Thorpe – Sergeant Match

7) A 2017 production directed by Nikolai Foster was a co-production between the Curve Theatre, Leicester and the Theatre Royal, Bath.

Cast

- Rufus Hound – Dr Prentice
- Dakota Blue Richards – Geraldine Barclay
- Catherine Russell – Mrs Prentice
- Jack Holden – Nicholas Beckett
- Jasper Britton – Dr Rance
- Ravi Aujla – Sergeant Match

=== Television ===
In 1987 the play was adapted for BBC2's Theatre Night series. First transmitted on 24 May, it was produced by Shaun Sutton and directed by Barry Davis.

Cast

- Dinsdale Landen – Dr Prentice
- Tessa Peake-Jones – Geraldine Barclay
- Prunella Scales – Mrs Prentice
- Tyler Butterworth – Nicholas Beckett
- Timothy West – Dr Rance
- Bryan Pringle – Sergeant Match

Channel 4's Blow Your Mind – See a Show series included a short extract from the play. Featuring Brian Cox as Dr Prentice, Frances Barber as Mrs Prentice and Clive Owen as Nicholas Beckett, it was transmitted on 18 September 1995.
