= The Good and Faithful Servant =

1964 television play by Joe Orton

- Original language: English
- Written by: Joe Orton
- Characters: Buchanan, Edith, Mrs. Vealfoy

Premiere
- Date: 1967
- Place: England

The Good and Faithful Servant is a darkly comic television play by the English playwright Joe Orton. It was originally written in 1964 and was filmed for British television by the company Associated-Rediffusion for ITV as part of the Seven Deadly Sins anthology series, shortly before author Joe Orton's murder in 1967.

The play was later performed theatrically. A production directed by Fred Proud was performed at the King's Head Theatre in Islington, London in 1971.

== Original television cast ==
- Donald Pleasence – Buchanan
- Hermione Baddeley – Edith
- Patricia Routledge – Mrs Vealfoy
- Sheila White – Debbie
- Richard O'Callaghan – Ray
- Jack Bligh – old man

== Plot ==
Buchanan, a doorman who has worked at the same company for fifty years is close to retirement when he meets Edith, a cleaning woman, who turns out to be his former lover and, unbeknownst to him, mother of his twin sons. Buchanan destroys his retirement gifts after having reflected on a wasted life, and in the following scene we see Buchanan and Edith, whom he married, waking up in bed together. Whilst she happily natters away Buchanan, tears running down his cheeks, closes his eyes and silently dies in bed next to her.

== Canadian version ==
A Canadian adaptation, with Cyril Cusack and Helen Burns in the lead roles, aired in 1975 as an episode of the CBC Television anthology series Performance.
