= Entertaining Mr Sloane =

1963 play by Joe Orton

- Methuen Drama edition cover, 2001
- Written by: Joe Orton
- Characters: Sloane, a young, good-looking psychopath; Kath, a middle-aged landlady; Ed, Kath's brother; Kemp, Kath and Ed's father
- Subject: A landlady and her brother entice a psychopathic young man into sexual liaisons
- Genre: Black comedy
- Setting: A house on the edge of a rubbish dump

Premiere
- Date: 6 May 1964
- Place: New Arts Theatre; London, England

Entertaining Mr Sloane is a three-act play written in 1963 by the English playwright Joe Orton. It was first produced in London at the New Arts Theatre on 6 May 1964 and transferred to the West End's Wyndham's Theatre on 29 June 1964.

== Plot summary ==
=== Act 1 ===
Mr Sloane, a young man looking for a place to board, happens by the residence of Kath, a middle-aged landlady whose home is on the outskirts of a rubbish dump. Kath is eager to have Mr Sloane as a tenant at her home, which she shares with her nearly-blind father Kemp. Getting acquainted with Mr Sloane, Kath is open about a previous relationship she had which led to her bearing a child; her brother insisted that she give it up for adoption because it was conceived out of wedlock. Mr Sloane reveals he is himself an orphan, though vague about his parents' death, except that they "passed away together". Kath's father immediately distrusts Mr Sloane, believing him to be the man who killed his employer some years earlier. After Kemp and Sloane have an altercation that gets Sloane stabbed in the leg, Kath starts making subtle advances toward the young man. When he tries to reciprocate, Kath facetiously warns him not to betray her trust. Her brother Ed soon arrives and is dismayed to see his sister's new boarder. Kemp has an estranged relationship with his son as he found him to be "committing some kind of felony in the bedroom" as a teenager. Despite Ed's initial opposition to Mr Sloane staying with his sister, after speaking with him, Ed eventually relents and even offers him a job as his chauffeur. As Sloane recovers from his injury, Kath returns wearing a transparent negligee and seemingly seduces Mr Sloane as the lights go down and Act One ends.

=== Act 2 ===
The action resumes "some months later" and begins with Mr Sloane recounting an evening in which a young woman gave him her telephone number. Kath ambiguously hints at her jealousy, then reveals that she is pregnant and concerned that her brother will strongly disapprove. Ed arrives soon after and discovers that Mr Sloane took his car out joyriding the night before with his friends. Upon finding out that they also had a woman with them, Ed divulges that he feels women are crude, and misleading. Ed advises Sloane to pack his things as he will be on call as his assistant at all hours. When Sloane leaves the room to pack, Kemp mildly attempts to reconcile with his son, and conveys that Kath and Sloane have been sleeping together and he believes that Kath is pregnant. When confronted, Sloane confirms he has been sleeping with Kath, but claims that she "threw herself" at him. A short time later, Ed departs to buy cigarettes, and Kemp returns to confront Sloane as his employer's murderer. Sloane eventually attacks Kemp, resulting in his death.

=== Act 3 ===
Upon finding his dead father, Ed is initially insistent that justice be served and Sloane be turned over to the police. However, Sloane persuades Ed to fabricate a story to make the death appear an accident, in exchange for his servitude. When Kath discovers the dead body, she is apprehensive to stray from the truth especially given Sloane's intention to go and live with her brother. Sloane finds himself in a predicament: if he stays with Kath, Ed will report the murder to the authorities, and vice versa if he chooses to leave with Ed. Ultimately, a compromise is reached that will result in the pair "sharing" Mr. Sloane a few months at a time.

== Productions ==
The play premiered in the West End in 1964, thanks to the financial support of Terence Rattigan, who had seen the play at the New Arts Theatre, rated it highly and put up £3,000 in sponsorship. It was directed by Patrick Dromgoole and starred Madge Ryan as Kath, Dudley Sutton as Sloane, Charles Lamb as Kemp, and Peter Vaughan as Ed. It was designed by Timothy O'Brien, with costumes supervised by Tazeena Firth.

The Broadway production, directed by Alan Schneider, opened at the Lyceum Theatre on 12 October 1965 and closed after 13 performances. It starred Sheila Hancock as Kath, Dudley Sutton as Sloane, Lee Montague as Ed, and George Turner as Kemp. William Ritman designed the sets and costumes.

The play was revived as part of the Joe Orton Festival at the Royal Court Theatre in London. Directed by Roger Croucher, it opened on 17 April 1975 and subsequently transferred to the Duke of York's Theatre in July. It starred Beryl Reid as Kath, Malcolm McDowell as Sloane, James Ottaway as Kemp, and Ronald Fraser as Ed. Harry H. Corbett later took over as Ed and Kenneth Cranham as Sloane. John Gunter designed the sets and Deirdre Clancy supervised the costumes. It closed in October 1975.

A subsequent London production at the Lyric Theatre, Hammersmith in 1981 was directed by Kenneth Williams and starred Barbara Windsor as Kath. Windsor reprised the role for a national tour in 1993 co-starring John Challis, Christopher Villiers, and Kenneth Waller, directed by John David, produced by Lee Dean, and designed by Mark Bailey.

An Off Broadway Revival in 1982 at the Cherry Lane Theatre won the Drama Desk Award for Outstanding Revival. Produced by Howard Feuer, Jeremy Ritzer, Laurence Gordon and Sidney Shlenker and directed by John Tillinger, it starred Maxwell Caulfield as Sloane, Barbara Bryne as Kath, Gwyllum Evans as Kemp, and Jerome Dempsey as Ed.

In 1985 Greg Hersov directed a production at the Royal Exchange, Manchester with Adam Ant as Sloane, Sylvia Syms as Kath and James Maxwell as Ed.

The Roundabout Theatre Company revived the play in 2005 under the direction of Scott Ellis. It starred Alec Baldwin as Ed, Chris Carmack as Sloane, Jan Maxwell as Kath, and Richard Easton as Kemp. The design team included Allen Moyer (sets), Michael Krass (costumes), Ken Posner (lights), and John Gromada (original music and sound).

In 1997 Dominic Cooke directed a production for Terry Hands' inaugural season at Clwyd Theatr Cymru, which was staged in the Emlyn Williams Theatre, and starred Joe McFadden as Sloane, Robert Blythe as Ed, Lynne Verrall as Kath, and Jimmy Gardner as Kemp.

In 2007, the Melbourne Theatre Company staged a production at the Fairfax Theatre in the Melbourne Arts Centre in Melbourne. Directed by Simon Phillips, it starred Richard Piper as Ed, Ben Guerens as Sloane, Amanda Muggleton as Kath, and Bob Hornery as Kemp. It was designed by Shaun Gorton, with music by David Chesworth.

From 29 January 2009, a production at the Trafalgar Studios in London starred Imelda Staunton as Kath, Mathew Horne as Sloane, Simon Paisley Day as Ed and Richard Bremmer as Kemp. Horne collapsed during a performance on 2 April 2009 with a suspected virus. The show played at the Trafalgar until 11 April 2009.

A 2012 production at the Comédie des Champs-Élysées in Paris, directed by Michel Fau (as Que faire de Mr Sloane?) featured Gaspard Ulliel in the title role, Charlotte de Turckheim as Kath and Fau as Eddie.

In 2025 Nadia Fall directed a production at the Young Vic with Tamzin Outhwaite as Kath, Jordan Stephens as Mr Sloane, Daniel Cerqueira as Ed and Christopher Fairbank as Kemp.

== Screen adaptations ==
A television adaptation was broadcast by ITV in the Playhouse series on 15 July 1968, and directed by Peter Moffatt. It starred Sheila Hancock as Kath, Edward Woodward as Ed, Clive Francis as Sloane, and Arthur Lovegrove as Kemp. Originally made in monochrome on videotape by Associated-Rediffusion, it survives as a telerecording.

Clive Exton wrote the screenplay for a 1970 feature film directed by Douglas Hickox and starring Beryl Reid, Peter McEnery, Harry Andrews and Alan Webb.

== Awards ==
- 1982 Drama Desk Award for Outstanding Revival
- 1996 Lucille Lortel Award for Outstanding Revival

== Sources ==
- Banham, Martin, ed. 1998. The Cambridge Guide to Theatre. Cambridge: Cambridge UP. ISBN 0-521-43437-8.
- Bigsby, C. W. E. 1982. Joe Orton. Contemporary Writers ser. London: Routledge. ISBN 0-416-31690-5.
- Burke, Arthur. 2001. Laughter in the Dark – The Plays of Joe Orton. Billericay, Essex: Greenwich Exchange. ISBN 1-871551-56-0.
- Charney, Maurice. 1984. Joe Orton. Grove Press Modern Dramatists ser. NY: Grove P. ISBN 0-394-54241-X.
- Coppa, Francesca, ed. 2002. Joe Orton: A Casebook. Casebooks on Modern Dramatists ser. London: Routledge. ISBN 0-8153-3627-6.
- DiGaetani, John Louis. 2008. Stages of Struggle: Modern Playwrights and Their Psychological Inspirations. Jefferson: McFarland. ISBN 0-7864-3157-1.
- Napierkowski, Marie Rose, ed. (1998). "Entertaining Mr Sloane: Introduction.". Drama for Students. Vol. 3. Detroit: Gale.
- Orton, Joe. 1976. The Complete Plays. London: Methuen. ISBN 0-413-34610-2.
- Orton, Joe (1964). Entertaining Mr Sloane. London: Hamish Hamilton. ISBN 9781472522054. OCLC 3174347.
- Ruskino, Susan. 1995. Joe Orton. Twayne's English Authors ser. Boston: Twayne. ISBN 0-8057-7034-8.
