= Island Queen (disambiguation) =

Island Queen or The Island Queen may refer to:

== Novels ==
- The Island Queen (novel), an 1885 novel by R. M. Ballantyne
- Island Queen (novel), a 2021 novel by American novelist Vanessa Riley

== Ships ==
- Island Queen, a schooner wrecked off Sir Charles Hardy Islands in July 1854
- Island Queen (1896 steamboat)
- Island Queen (1925 steamboat)
- SS Island Queen, a steamship used as a patrol boat on the Great Lakes during the American Civil War in the 1960s.
- SS Island Queen, a British coastal steamship launched in 1920, later renamed SS Abukir

== Other uses ==
- The Island Queen, Islington, a Grade II listed public house in Islington, London

== See also ==
- Miss Island Queen Pageant, a beauty pageant held in American Samoa
