= The Pirate City: An Algerine Tale =

1874 novel by R. M. Ballantyne

Cover page of the book

The Pirate City: An Algerine Tale, or simply The Pirate City, is a novel written by R. M. Ballantyne that was published in 1874. It is a work of juvenile fiction and adventure fiction that follows the Rimini family. The family disembarks from Sicily on a trading expedition only to be captured by North Africain pirates and taken to the pirate city of Algiers, which is the present-day capital of Algeria.

== Publication ==
The work was published by James Nisbet & Co. in London, England. The original location was 15 Castle Street in London, but in 1836, the location moved to 21 Berners Street. Nisbet & Co. also published works such as The Wide, Wide World by Susan Warner and was associated with Edinburgh University Press. This company was known for its biographies, as well as religious, children's, and juvenile texts.

== Literary and historical context ==
The Pirate City was written shortly after Ballantyne spent several months in Algiers, learning of the city's history. The lawlessness of this setting was based on historical fact. Large amounts of navy deserters from the powers involved in the Napoleonic Wars gathered in Algiers in the early 1800s. Criminals of all countries used the town as their haven, joining one another in order to conduct piratical raids on ships near the north coast of Africa, leading to the city being deemed the 'Pirates Nest' by the seafarers of the time. The Pirate City's climax occurs when Britain's Lord Exmouth (a.k.a. Edward Pellew) attacks the city of Algiers to rescue the city's Christian inhabitants and disband the pirate forces. This event, known as the "Bombardment of Algiers" happened in August 1816, when British and Dutch forces, led by Exmouth and Van de Cappelan respectively, destroyed the harbored corsair fleet. This attack was prompted by a massacre of several hundred fishermen under British protection by pirates hailing from the city. It is said that the Dey had managed to gather over 40,000 men to protect his city with the British attack. Exmouth gave the Dey demands, such as the abolition of Christian slavery and the delivery of all Christian slaves from Algiers. Upon failing to receive a reply, the forces opened fire upon one another. After the fighting was finished, over twelve hundred slaves were released and $385,000 of ransom money was repaid. The bombardment settled little, and piracy had returned within the year. In 1830, when the French annexed Algeria, piracy from the city came to an end.

== Characters ==
- Mariano Rimini – Youngest brother of the Rimini clan, brawny and manly.
- Lucien Rimini – Eldest brother of the Rimini clan, slim and well-learned. Becomes a scribe for the Dey (king) in the pirate city.
- Francisco Rimini – Father of Mariano and Lucien.
- Signor Bacri – Jewish ship captain of the trading vessel that is captured by pirates. Wealthy trader who hails from Algiers.
- Sidi Hassan – Pirate captain who captures the Rimini clan and the sisters Paulina and Angela, who eventually helps Sidi Omar gain the title of Dey.
- Achmet Pasha – King of the pirate city who lives in an extravagant palace with his wife Ashweesha.
- Sidi Omar – Rival of Achmet Pasha whose ignorance leads to his eventual downfall.
- Colonel Langley – British consul to the Algiers who lives in a fortified abode with his wife and two children.
- Paulina Ruffini – Italian woman and elder sister to Angela who is captured by pirates and taken to the pirate city to be sold as a slave.
- Angela Diego – Younger sister of Paulina, becomes the object of Mariano's affection.
- Ted Flaggan – Irish sailor saved from enslavement by Colonel Langley who also serves as comedic relief.
- Zubby – African maidservant to the Langley family who serves as comedic relief.
- Rais Ali – Sailor and best friend of Ted Flaggan, loyal to Colonel Langley.
- Sidi Cadua – Rival of Achmet Pasha.
- Sidi Hamet – Rival of Achmet Pasha.
- Hadji Baba – Jester to the Dey (king) of the pirate city. Trickster of the story who double-crosses everyone for his own gain.
- Lord Exmouth – British Naval officer who attacks and rescues everyone from Algiers.

== Plot summary ==
The Pirate City follows the three members of the Rimini family on their adventure to the African city of Algiers, (in present-day Algeria). The story begins in the Remini abode in Sicily, where Francisco and his two sons, Lucien and Mariano, are contemplating their trading expedition to Malta. Upon leaving Sicily on Signor Bacri's boat, the family is attacked and captured by Barbary Pirates led by one Sidi Hassan. The ensuing scene shows the family putting up a worthy fight against their adversaries, but they are eventually overcome after Hassan threatens to kill an injured Mariano if they do not come peacefully. Hassan takes the Rimini family and Signor Bacri's ship for his own and heads toward the city of Algiers. On their way to the city, Sidi Hassan captures another Sicilian vessel along with two sisters, Angela and Paulina. The pirates also sail by a ship flying the Union Jack, but they leave it alone as the British are said to be "protected". Hassan takes all of the characters to the pirate city and sells them into slavery alongside thousands of other Christians in the Bagnio, the slave prison. The family resists enslavement initially until a warning from Signor Bacri that describes terrible torture unless they remain passive. The Rimini family listens to Bacri's advice and remains docile until an escape attempt presents itself.

The Riminis are eventually saved from manual labor, torture, and various inhumane acts by Signor Bacri, the wealthy Jewish merchant who was captain of the trading vessel that was captured initially by Hassan. Bacri bribes the Dey (king of the pirates) to get Lucien assigned as his scribe. This allows Lucien to garner influence from Dey Achmet in hopes that he would eventually be able to save his family from slavery. Paulina, one of the captured sisters, is given to the British Consul in the city, Colonel Langley. He keeps her as a maidservant in his household alongside an African woman named Zubby and an Irishman named Ted Flaggan; both of these characters portray racial stereotypes and act as comic relief for the rest of the text. Mr. Langley spends the rest of the text attempting to rescue various slaves, namely Paulina's sister Angela who has been sent to the slave market to be sold only to be rescued by Signor Bacri at the last moment.

The position of Dey in the city is precarious, as all pirates covet the position. This is because the Dey takes tribute from all the consuls within the city in return for their country's ships remaining unscathed on the sea. This leads to internal strife and infighting among the pirates of the city; peace is rare. Pasha Achmet and his rivals battle for the position of Dey, leading to Dey Achmet's decapitation. A new Dey, Hamet, gains the throne only to be removed from it on that same day by Sidi Omar with the help of Sidi Hassan. During this time, martial law is declared in the city, and pirates begin looting everywhere there is not secured or protected.

In the ensuing confusion of this looting period, Francisco and Mariano escape the Bagnio and meet up with Signor Bacri, who takes them to a safe house to wait out the looters. While being transported, Mariano is captured again and sent to the Bagnio. This leads Lucien, Francisco, and Bacri on a rescue mission that fails. Lucien and Francisco then head to a hidden cave a short way from the city to hide from being enslaved once again. As Dey Omar takes the throne, he angers all the European consuls due to his lack of respect and political knowledge. He attacks a Greek ship and a Danish ship and refuses to listen to the country's consuls' requests to relinquish them. After Dey Omar refuses to negotiate with the consuls, Colonel Langley calls a meeting of all the consuls in the city. In a unanimous vote, they decide the pirates must be dealt with. Colonel Langley then sends for the British fleet. The fleet, which was previously too busy fighting other countries to deal with the pirates, arrives and saves the day. The British Navy arrives with Lord Exmouth at the helm, and with the help of Irish sailor Ted Flaggan, destroys the city and the pirate fleet. The city is liberated,liberated and all the Christian slaves are freed. The text ends happily with the Rimini family united in their abode with Mariano and Angela happily married with children.

== Reception ==
During his publishing career, Ballantyne's writing style was both praised and criticized. In 1858 a publication titled The Athaneum commented on Ballantyne's work by stating, "The illustrations to [his] work[s] are beautiful, the descriptions of scenery are excellent, and the adventures are wonderful enough to satisfy the most inordinate wonder-seeker". In 1893, Review of Reviews mentions that Ballantyne's works deal too much with religion. To this, Ballantyne himself replied "I believe in the necessity for salvation, and I will always bring religion into my books, no matter what others may say." Shortly after The Coral Island was published, The Scotsman praised him, saying "Mr. Ballantyne ought to be a decided favourite with young readers, for not content with introducing them to far distant lands- ranging from the cold and cheerless regions of North America to the beautiful islands of the Pacific he makes young boys the heroes of all his stories, endowing them with wonderful fortitude and perseverance. [The Coral Island] has all the advantages of Mr. Ballantyne's former works; it is both instructive and amusing".

Contemporary critics view Ballantyne's work alongside that of Daniel Defoe and Robert Louis Stevenson. Ballantyne writes in an easygoing and accessible style. The details in his work are factually accurate, and he gives his readers clear and stern messages about moral purity and godliness. By today's standards, Ballantyne's heroes are sober, farsighted, and without a sense of humor.

== Genre and style ==
This work of juvenile adventure fiction, also known as a Robinsonade, is a take on the foreign cities of Africa by one of the 19th century children's literature novelists. The writing style is dialogue-driven with action-packed sections in every chapter. The story moves along at a quick pace and uses exciting and exotic descriptions, to avoid becoming too dull for his young audience. Eric Quayle, the author of "Ballantyne the Brave", states that Ballantyne's work "could be relied upon to stir romance and danger into humdrum affairs of everyday life and whose stories never failed to tingle with the steel of dramatic suspense and the bloodthirsty incidents so beloved by boys of all ages".

== Gender in the Text ==
The males are different variations of acceptable masculinity in 19th-century Britain; they are "hero[s] [with] God, certainty, the power of the knowledge of right, and English Imperialism as unquestionable guides" in their adventure. Ballantyne is careful to refrain from the sexes showing anything other than platonic interests in one another. His strict Presbyterianism made him hesitant to mention sex at all. Even Ballantyne's villains "never permitted themselves to be anything but perfect gentlemen in their encounters with [women]".

The women in the text are portrayed as unintelligent and infantile, not yet the "New Woman" that would emerge in British culture during the fin-de-siècle. All the Christian characters encounter great peril but remain unscathed. Contrasting sharply with this are the "Mohammedans", who torture one another without mercy.

== Themes ==
- One of the major themes of this novel is Christianity and how followers of this faith are ethically and morally superior to those of other creeds. The contrast between the Mohammedans and Christians in the text is striking, with the former religion promoting torture, slavery, and violence while the latter is portrayed as having the proper morals and ethics. This is just a reflection of the societal elitism of the British during the fin de siècle.
- Racism is another key issue in the text, as the Moorish, African, and Arab peoples are portrayed in a very negative light, in contrast with the white Christians who appear to do no wrong. Britain's colonialist attitudes are reflected within the text, as "The certainties of [children's literature] were based on an unquestioning nineteenth-century belief that could look to God and the King as absolute centers of truth". These racial and religious stereotypes were representative of general British opinion of the day. Victorian racial attitudes were inculcated in children through books of this genre and historical texts of the time.
- Another major theme is masculinity, as the text serves as a guide on proper behavior for Ballantyne's young audience. "The construction of 'Englishness' in nineteenth-century English children's literature is directly related to imperialism and the qualities of manliness required to produce both a conquering force and a body coherent with the requirements of England, center to the empire." This text also "effectively demonstrate[s] the hierarchical nature of patriarchal social organization, which [uses] 'difference,' whether of embodiment, sexuality, race, religion, social class, or ethnicity, as a rationale for domination and as a legitimation of the use of violence as a means of social control". The women in the text are submissive to their male counterparts.
