= The Eagle Cliff =

1889 novel by R.M. Ballantyne

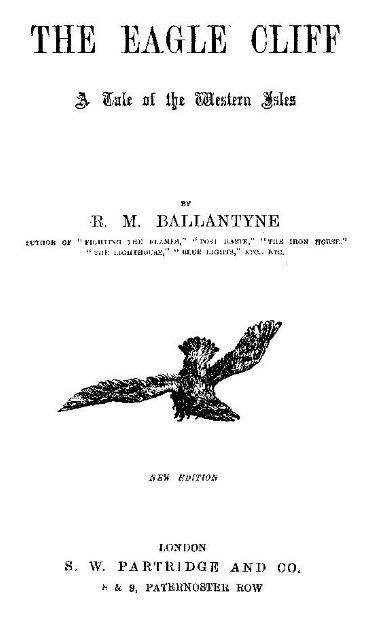
- Title page for The Eagle Cliff (1890 edition)
- Author: R.M. Ballantyne
- Original title: The Eagle Cliff
- Language: English
- Genre: Adventure
- Published: 1889
- Pages: 196

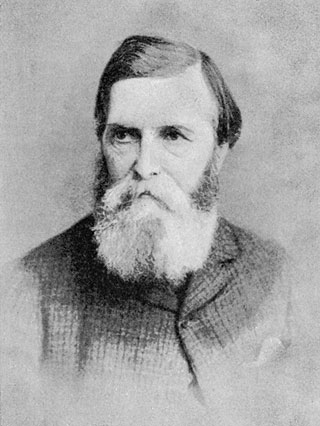
Robert Michael Ballantyne

The Eagle Cliff is a novel written in 1889 by the Scottish author R.M. Ballantyne. At the age of 16, he traveled to Canada, where he spent five years working for the Hudson's Bay Company, trading with the First Nations for furs. His Canadian experiences formed the basis for his first novel, The Young Fur Traders, published in 1856, the year he decided to become a full-time writer and embarked on the adventure stories for the young with which his name is popularly associated. His most popular novel was The Coral Island, published in 1858.

== Plot summary ==
The Eagle Cliff is a third-person tale that begins with the hero, a cyclist soon identified as John Barrett, who is racing through the streets of London to respond to a telegram from an old schoolmate, Bob Mabberly. The unconventional hero has a literally bumpy start to his journey as he accidentally runs into a little old lady. Though she appears to be alright, Barret's fear of being arrested causes him to flee. However, because he is the hero, he cannot shake the guilty conscience and returns to the site of the accident, only to find that the old lady and the crowd that gathered to be gone. Wrought with worry, Barret makes his way to Mabberly. Mabberly has engaged a yacht and crew and intends to "sail, without fail" the next morning with Barrett and another schoolmate, Giles Jackman. The next day, not long at sea, misfortune befalls the party and they collide with a passing steamer, causing their vessel to split down the middle. Now in the water, the men make their way toward the rocky shore of a now-visible island. Upon arrival, the men elect Barrett to search for habitation. He comes across a sheep track, a primitive road and eventually a hut among the rocks. From here, Barrett begins to meet the people who reside on the island, all of whom are white. When the rest of the party joins Barrett, they are happy to learn the houses there are fully functioning (with kitchens and bedrooms, each stocked appropriately). As fate would have it, Barrett happens upon a young girl, Milly, lying on the road, who has injured her arm after falling from a cliff. Barret eventually develops feelings for her. He and Milly share a love for botany, which was the cause of her fall from the cliff, and use this area of interest to pave the way for further interaction. Elsewhere, the men engage in hunting outings as well as occasionally fishing (or in Archie's case, photography). Meanwhile, Milly has been writing home, telling her mother about the man who saved her life, effectively causing her mother to become fond of him. When news of Mrs. Moss' arrival reaches Barrett, he rushes to meet her, only to nearly knock her over. She turns out to be the very same woman Barrett had hit with his bicycle earlier on. At this point, though she recognizes him as the man who ran her down, she does not know he is Barret. After falling from a cliff and falling unconscious, Barrett does not show up for supper, worrying the others and causing them to search for him. Once found, he is unrecognizable due to the bruising and head-dressings he now bears, successfully continuing to hide his identity from Mrs. Moss. Once he has healed and she discovers that he is indeed Barrett, she agrees to forgive him, thus allowing Milly and him to marry.

== Prominent Characters ==
- John Barrett

A young man, with a literal run-in with fate, who crashes on an island and discovers that it is already inhabited by civilized families. It is on first day that he finds a girl lying unconscious on a road who turns out to later be his love interest. Together they share a love for botany and art, which Barrett spends most of his time doing, as opposed to hunting and fishing like his male counterparts.

- Milly Moss

A woman who lives on the island and is found by John Barrett. She quickly becomes his infatuation and eventually his bride. Her interest in botany serves as an entry for Barrett and her to flirt.

- Bob Mabberly

An old schoolmate of John Barrett's who invites him to sea with him and joins him on the island.

- Giles Jackman

Also an old schoolmate of John Barrett and Bob Mabberly. He pulls the group together to recount a tale of hunting elephants. He leads a church service in the absence of the minister.

- Junkie

A young boy who lives on the island and attempts to follow in the footsteps of the grown men around him.

- Ivor Donaldson

The alcoholic on the island who has a tendency to become violent whilst drunk. He eventually finds God and stops drinking.

== Writing Style & Genre ==
The Eagle Cliff is told through an editorial voice that occasionally converses with the reader. The story is advanced through use of dialogue primarily, but also through detailed descriptions of environment. The descriptions of the environment and their large presence in the text can most likely be attributed to Ballantyne's admitted blunder in The Coral Island regarding the coconut shell thickness and how this mistake encouraged him to visit the scenes in which his stories were told for authenticity. This made him one of the first writers of fictional adventure stories to carry out background research to make his stories more realistic.

Through his dedication to realistically depicting the environments that he wrote about, Ballantyne takes part in the literary movement called Naturalism and is thus considered a Naturalist. His novels illustrate environments as close to reality as possible. Josh Rahn of Morehead State University states: “Naturalism displayed some very specific characteristics that delimit it from the contemporary literature that was merely realistic. The environment, especially the social environment, played a large part in how the narrative developed. The locale essentially becomes its own character, guiding the human characters in ways they do not fully realize. Plot structure as such was secondary to the inner workings of character, which superficially resembles how the Realists approached characterization Naturalist texts typically include darker, more grim situations, often depicting characters of lower class standing or people powerless against a much stronger force. This happens to a degree in the Eagle Cliff as the main characters end up shipwrecked on an unfamiliar island and lose all of their belongings. However, after some exploration, they find a population of civilized people living in relatively amicable homes.

The novel is reminiscent of the Robinsonade genre as they share common themes and conventions, but does not commit to them fully. As mentioned, The main characters are well off financially and while their shipwreck causes them to lose their resources, they quickly regain similar luxuries on the island because the people already inhabiting it possess them. Their safety is therefore only somewhat threatened before landing on the seemingly deserted island. In typical Robinsonade novels, the protagonist is abruptly isolated from civilization, oftentimes due to a shipwreck in which he/she is marooned on a secluded and uninhabited island. He must improvise the means of his survival from the limited resources at hand.

Unlike many adventure novels, The Eagle Cliff seems to avoid the presence of dark-skinned "savages". Instead, it focuses more on the miniature Britain that is built on the island and how the characters interact with it as well as one another. In fact, a group decides to attend church services and proceeds to take a short boat ride to it. It is here where Ballantyne's inclusion of religion is most noticeable.

== Historical Content ==
After the events in the Congo, portrayed in Joseph Conrad's Heart of Darkness, there was a decline in imperialistic attitude amongst the British population. This could indicate why there is a lack of "others" within The Eagle Cliff.

== Themes ==
=== Masculinity ===
The novel makes a point to focus on the masculine activities that each male on the island (whether they be inhabitants or visitors) is familiar with. The people already inhabiting the island have no shortage of guns, fishing equipment or desire to put these items to use, and frequently do. In fact, the novel is centered largely around these activities and the homo-social relationships they cultivate through participating.

=== Fate & Romance ===
Though it is subtle amongst the instances of hunting, fishing and other activities, this novel can be read as one about romance. From the book's beginning, Ballantyne plays with the idea of fate. Just the reader meets John Barrett, he has a collision with a little old lady. His decision to flee (despite turning around to correct his injustice) effects his journey from that point on. As the book continues, it is discovered that Barrett's Intended is the daughter of the very woman he ran down earlier, providing obstacles for the budding couple. This aligns with common characteristics in naturalist texts because that particular movement deals with determinism. Determinism is the idea that a character has a direct control on the course of his/her life is superseded by a concentration on nature of fate. Another common characteristic of naturalist texts is a shocking twist at the end of the story. We see this in The Eagle Cliff when John Barrett runs into a woman on the island, the very woman he ran down at the beginning of the story, and she turns out to be his intended's mother.

=== Christianity ===
Woven through the plot, there are countless mentions of religion, which serves as a moral guideline for the characters. Following suit with many of his other juvenile novels, Ballantyne includes a theme of Christianity. John Rennie Short claims that Ballantyne's piety and writing style were quite attractive leading to his enormous popularity: "[his] books were aimed at the sons of the Victorian middle class. Imbued with deep religious conviction, he felt he had a moral purpose of educating such boys into codes of honor, decency, and religiosity. The high moral tone was redeemed by Ballantyne's ability to tell a cracking good yarn in an accessible and well-fashioned prose style."

=== Natives and imperialism ===
Unlike the typical nature of adventure novel, The Eagle Cliff is mostly devoid of native encounters. When the main characters arrive at the island, rather than being met by dark-skinned natives, they are met by hospitable and civilized white British settlers. The only mention of non-white people comes from a story regarding elephant hunting told by Giles Jackman. "Great men from all parts of the country assembled at this hunt, some of them bringing troops of tame elephants and followers with them. There were governors and rajahs, and private secretaries, with some of their wives, military officers, forest officers, commissioners, collectors, superintendents, magistrates, surgeons, medical officers, and even clergymen, besides a host of smaller fry and servants. It was a regular army!" Despite the absence of island natives, the novel is not without imperialistic undertones. Following a popular adventure fiction trope, the presence of an island coupled with a shipwreck to said island is include, however, there is not much said in the way of politics or military.

== Critical reception ==
Unfortunately there is very little scholarly concentration on The Eagle Cliff in particular, other than a brief book review found in the archives of The Spectator from 7 December 1889. Rather, most scholarly examination lumps several or all of Ballantyne's work into one.

Due to Ballantyne's dedication to research for authenticity, he wrote in "Personal Reminiscences in Book-Making" that he aimed to complete as much research on his chosen environment as possible. This made him one of the first writers of fictional adventure stories to carry out background research to make his stories more realistic. Most critics agree that he was well-researched.

Michelle Elleray discusses Ballantyne's overt Christianity and "his roles as a children's author to involve conveying educational information to boys in an enticing fictional format." She also discusses the self-sufficient nature of Ballantyne's characters, in the context of his conveying education to young raiders: "Ballantyne's boys therefore mark a development in the literary articulation of the child's capacity for self-sufficient action."
