= Joseph Bristow =

Joseph Bristow may refer to:

- Joseph L. Bristow (1861–1944), American Republican politician from Kansas
- Joseph Bristow (literary scholar), professor of English literature at UCLA
