= The Coral Island =

1857 novel by R. M. Ballantyne

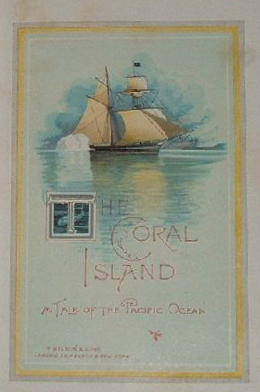
- Title page, illustrated 1893 edition of The Coral Island
- Author: R. M. Ballantyne
- Language: English
- Genre: Adventure novel
- Publisher: T. Nelson & Sons
- Publication date: 1857
- Media type: Print (hardback & paperback)
- Text: The Coral Island at Wikisource

The Coral Island: A Tale of the Pacific Ocean is an 1857 novel written by the Scottish author R. M. Ballantyne. One of the first works of juvenile fiction to feature exclusively juvenile heroes, the story relates the adventures of three boys marooned on a South Pacific island, the only survivors of a shipwreck.

A typical Robinsonade – a genre of fiction inspired by Daniel Defoe's Robinson Crusoe – and one of the most popular of its type, the book first went on sale in late 1857 and has never been out of print. Among the novel's major themes are the civilising effect of Christianity, 19th-century imperialism in the South Pacific, and the importance of hierarchy and leadership. It was the inspiration for William Golding's novel Lord of the Flies (1954), which inverted the morality of The Coral Island; in Ballantyne's story the children encounter evil, but in Lord of the Flies evil is within them.

In the early 20th century, the novel was considered a classic for primary school children in the UK, and in the United States it was a staple of high-school suggested reading lists. Modern critics such as Joseph Bristow and Brian Street consider the book's worldview to be dated and imperialist, but although less popular today, The Coral Island was adapted into a four-part children's television drama broadcast by ITV in 2000.

== Background ==
=== Biographical background and publication ===
Born in Edinburgh in 1825, and raised there, Ballantyne was the ninth of ten children and the youngest son. Tutored by his mother and sisters, his only formal education was a brief period at Edinburgh Academy in 1835–37. At the age of 16 he travelled to Canada, where he spent five years working for the Hudson's Bay Company, trading with the First Nations for furs. He returned to Scotland in 1847 and for some years worked for the publisher Messrs Constable, first as a clerk and then as a partner in the business. During his time in Canada he had helped to pass the time by writing long letters to his mother – to which he attributed "whatever small amount of facility in composition [he] may have acquired" – and began his first book. Ballantyne's Canadian experiences formed the basis of his first novel, The Young Fur Traders, published in 1856, the year he decided to become a full-time writer and embarked on the adventure stories for the young with which his name is popularly associated.

Ballantyne never visited the coral islands of the South Pacific, relying instead on the accounts of others that were then beginning to emerge in Britain, which he exaggerated for theatrical effect by including "plenty of gore and violence meant to titillate his juvenile readership". His ignorance of the South Pacific caused him to erroneously describe coconuts as being soft and easily opened. After learning of this mistake, he resolved to write only about things he had personal experience of. Ballantyne wrote The Coral Island while staying in a house on the Burntisland seafront opposite Edinburgh on the Firth of Forth in Fife. According to Ballantyne biographer Eric Quayle he borrowed extensively from an 1852 novel by the American author James F. Bowman, The Island Home. He also borrowed from John Williams's Narrative of Missionary Enterprises (1837), to the extent that cultural historian Rod Edmond has suggested that Ballantyne must have written one chapter of The Coral Island with Williams's book open in front of him, so similar is the text. Edmond describes the novel as "a fruit cocktail of other writing about the Pacific", adding that "by modern standards Ballantyne's plagiarism in The Coral Island is startling".

Although the first edition is dated 1858 it was on sale in bookshops from early December 1857; dating books forward was a common practice at the time, especially during the Christmas period, to "preserve their newness" into the new year. The Coral Island is Ballantyne's second novel, (Note: The Coral Island is Ballantyne's third book, but his first, Hudson's Bay; or, Every-day Life in the Wilds of North America (1848) is a work of non-fiction.) and has never been out of print. He was an exceedingly prolific author who wrote more than 100 books in his 40-year career. According to professor and author John Rennie Short, Ballantyne had a "deep religious conviction", and felt it his duty to educate Victorian middle-class boys – his target audience – in "codes of honour, decency, and religiosity".

The first edition of The Coral Island was published by T. Nelson & Sons, who in common with many other publishers of the time had a policy when accepting a manuscript of buying the copyright from the author rather than paying royalties; as a result, authors generally did not receive any income from the sale of subsequent editions. (Note: It was not until the 1880s that the modern system of paying authors an agreed percentage of the retail price of every book sold became commonplace in Britain.) Ballantyne received between £50 and £60, (Note: About equivalent to £5,377 in 2025.) but when the novel's popularity became evident and the number of editions increased he tried unsuccessfully to buy back the copyright. He wrote bitterly to Nelsons in 1893 about the copyrights they held on his books while he had earned nothing: "for thirty-eight years [you have] reaped the whole profits".

The Coral Island – still considered a classic – was republished by Penguin Books in 1995, in their Popular Classics series.

=== Literary and historical context ===
Published during the "first golden age of children's fiction", The Coral Island began a trend in boys' fiction by using boys as the main characters, a device now commonplace in the genre. It preserves, according to literary critic Minnie Singh, the moralizing aspects of didactic texts, but does so (and in this regard it is a "founding text") by the "congruence of subject and implied reader": the story is about boys and written retrospectively as though by a boy, for an audience of boys.

According to literary critic Frank Kermode, The Coral Island "could be used as a document in the history of ideas". A scientific and social background for the novel is found in Darwinism, of the natural and the social kind. For instance, although The Coral Island was published a year before Origin of Species (whose ideas were already being circulated and discussed widely), Charles Darwin's 1842 The Structure and Distribution of Coral Reefs was one of the best-known contemporary accounts of the growth of coral. Ballantyne had been reading books by Darwin and by his rival Alfred Russel Wallace; in later publications he also acknowledged the naturalist Henry Ogg Forbes. The interest in evolutionary theory was reflected in much contemporary popular literature, and social Darwinism was an important factor contributing to the world view of the Victorians and their empire building.

== Plot summary ==
The story is written as a first-person narrative from the perspective of 15-year-old Ralph Rover, one of three boys shipwrecked on the coral reef of a large but uninhabited Polynesian island. Ralph tells the story retrospectively, looking back on his boyhood adventure: "I was a boy when I went through the wonderful adventures herein set down. With the memory of my boyish feelings strong upon me, I present my book especially to boys, in the earnest hope that they may derive valuable information, much pleasure, great profit, and unbounded amusement from its pages."

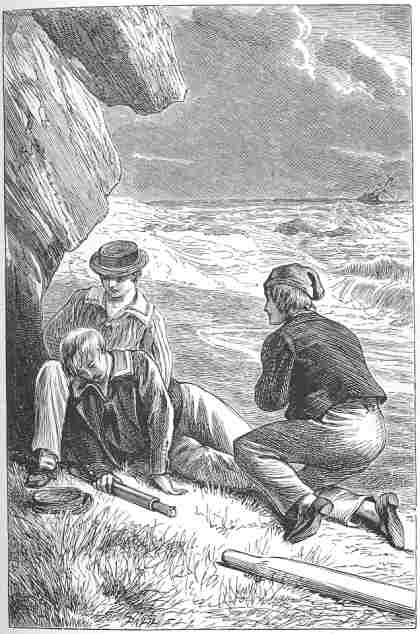
Jack, Ralph, and Peterkin after reaching the island, from an 1884 edition of the novel

The account starts briskly; only four pages are devoted to Ralph's early life and a further fourteen to his voyage to the Pacific Ocean on board the Arrow. He and his two companions – 18-year-old Jack Martin and 13-year-old Peterkin Gay – are the sole survivors of the shipwreck. The narrative is in two parts. The first describes how the boys feed themselves, what they drink, the clothing and shelter they fashion, and how they cope with having to rely on their own resources. The second half of the novel is more action-packed, featuring conflicts with pirates, fighting between the native Polynesians, and the conversion efforts of Christian missionaries.

Fruit, fish and wild pigs provide plentiful food, and at first the boys' life on the island is idyllic. They build a shelter and construct a small boat using their only possessions: a broken telescope, an iron-bound oar, and a small axe. Their first contact with other humans comes after several months when they observe two large outrigger canoes in the distance, one pursued by the other. The two groups of Polynesians disembark on the beach and engage in battle; the victors take fifteen prisoners and kill and eat one immediately. But when they threaten to kill one of the three women captured, along with two children, the boys intervene to defeat the pursuers, earning them the gratitude of the chief, Tararo. The next morning they prevent another act of cannibalism. The natives leave, and the boys are alone once more.

More unwelcome visitors then arrive in the shape of British pirates, who make a living by trading or stealing sandalwood. The three boys hide in a cave, but Ralph is captured when he ventures out to see if the intruders have left and is taken on board the pirate schooner. He strikes up a friendship with one of the crew, Bloody Bill, and when the ship calls at the island of Emo to trade for more wood Ralph experiences many facets of the island's culture: the popular sport of surfing, the sacrificing of babies to eel gods, rape, and cannibalism.

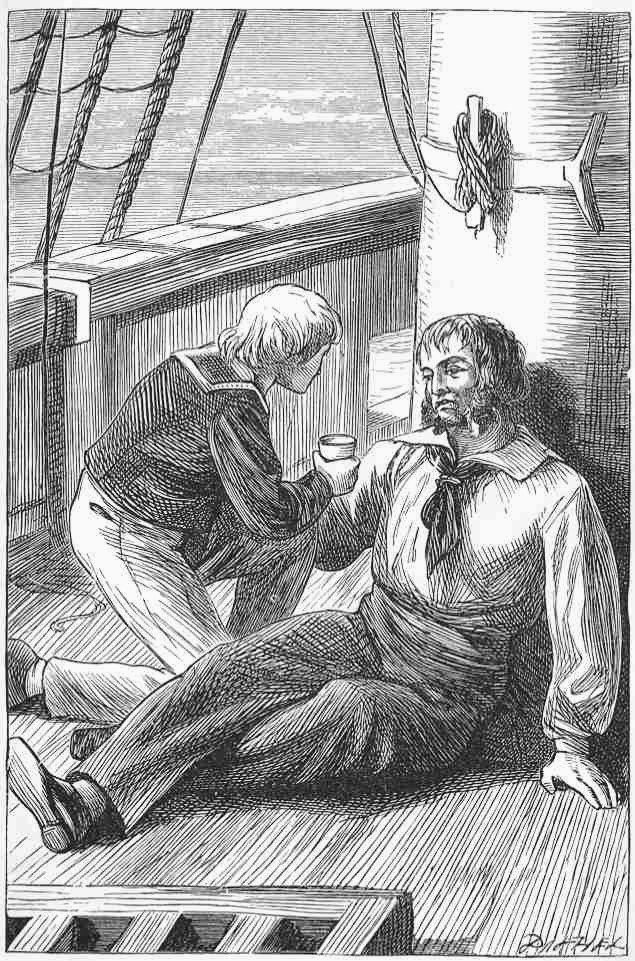
Ralph and Bloody Bill making their escape on board the pirate schooner, from an 1884 edition of the novel

Rising tensions result in the inhabitants attacking the pirates, leaving only Ralph and Bloody Bill alive. The pair succeed in making their escape in the schooner, but Bill is mortally wounded. He makes a death-bed repentance for his evil life, leaving Ralph to sail back to the Coral Island alone, where he is reunited with his friends.

The three boys sail to the island of Mango, where a missionary has converted some of the population to Christianity. There they once again meet Tararo, whose daughter Avatea wishes to become a Christian against her father's wishes. The boys attempt to take Avatea in a small boat to a nearby island the chief of which has been converted, but en route they are overtaken by one of Tararo's war canoes and taken prisoner. They are released a month later after the arrival of another missionary, and Tararo's conversion to Christianity. The "false gods" of Mango are consigned to the flames, and the boys set sail for home, older and wiser. They return as adults for another adventure in Ballantyne's 1861 novel The Gorilla Hunters, a sequel to The Coral Island.

== Genre and style ==
All Ballantyne's novels are, in his own words, "adventure stories for young folks", and The Coral Island is no exception. It is a Robinsonade, a genre of fiction inspired by Daniel Defoe's Robinson Crusoe (1719), one of the most popular of its type, and one of the first works of juvenile fiction to feature exclusively juvenile heroes. Susan Maher, professor of English, notes that, in comparison to Robinson Crusoe, such books generally replaced some of the original's romance with a "pedestrian realism", exemplified by works such as The Coral Island and Frederick Marryat's 1841 novel Masterman Ready, or the Wreck of the Pacific. Romance, with its attention to character development, was only restored to the genre of boys' fiction with Robert Louis Stevenson's Treasure Island, argues literary critic Lisa Honaker. The Coral Island, for all its adventure, is greatly occupied with the realism of domestic fiction (the domain of the realist novel); Ballantyne devotes about a third of the book to descriptions of the boys' living arrangements. The book exhibits a "light-hearted confidence" in its description of an adventure that was above all fun. As Ralph says in his preface: "If there is any boy or man who loves to be melancholy and morose, and who cannot enter with kindly sympathy into the regions of fun, let me seriously advise him to shut my book and put it away. It is not meant for him." Professor of English M. Daphne Kutzer has observed that "the swift movement of the story from coastal England to exotic Pacific island is similar to the swift movement from the real world to the fantastic in children's fantasy".

To a modern reader, Ballantyne's books can seem overly concerned with accounts of flora and fauna, an "ethnographic gloss" intended to suggest that their settings are real places offering adventures to those who can reach them. They can also seem "obtrusively pious", but, according to John Rennie Short, the moral tone of Ballantyne's writing is compensated for by his ability to tell a "cracking good yarn in an accessible and well-fashioned prose style".

== Themes ==
The major themes of the novel revolve around the influence of Christianity, the importance of social hierarchies, and the inherent superiority of civilised Europeans over the South Sea islanders; Martine Dutheil, professor of English, considers the novel "a key text mapping out colonial relations in the Victorian period". The basic subject of the novel is popular and widespread: "castaway children assuming adult responsibilities without adult supervision", and The Coral Island is considered the classic example of such a book.

I saw that these inhuman monsters were actually launching their canoe over the living bodies of their victims. But there was no pity in the breasts of these men. Forward they went in ruthless indifference, shouting as they went, while high above their voices rang the dying shrieks of those wretched creatures as, one after another, the ponderous canoe passed over them, burst the eyeballs from their sockets, and sent the life-blood gushing from their mouths. Oh reader, this is no fiction! I would not, for the sake of thrilling you with horror, invent so terrible a scene. It was witnessed. It is true – true as that accursed sin which has rendered the human heart capable of such diabolical enormities!

The supposed civilising influence of missionaries in spreading Christianity among the natives of the South Seas is an important theme of the second half of the story; as Jack remarks to Peterkin, "all the natives of the South Sea Islands are fierce cannibals, and they have little respect for strangers". Modern critics view this aspect of the novel less benevolently; Jerry Phillips, in a 1995 article, sees in The Coral Island the "perfect realiz[ation]" of "the official discourse of 19th century Pacific imperialism", which he argues was "obsessed with the purity of God, Trade, and the Nation."

The importance of hierarchy and leadership is also a significant element. The overarching hierarchy of race is informed by Victorian concepts, influenced by the new theories of evolution proposed by Darwin and others. In morals and culture, the natives are placed lower on the evolutionary ladder than are Europeans, as is evidenced in the battle over the native woman Avatea, which pits "the forces of civilization versus the forces of cannibalism". Another hierarchy is seen in the organisation of the boys. Although Jack, Ralph and Peterkin each have a say in how they should organise themselves, ultimately the younger boys defer to Jack, "a natural leader", particularly in a crisis, forming a natural hierarchy. The pirates also have a hierarchy, but one without democracy, and as a consequence are wiped out. The hierarchy of the natives is imposed by savagery. Ballantyne's message is that leaders should be respected by those they lead, and govern with their consent. This educational message is especially appropriate considering Ballantyne's adolescent audience, "the future rulers of the world".

Modern critics find darker undertones in the novel. In an essay published in College English in 2001, Martine Dutheil states that The Coral Island can be thought of as epitomising a move away from "the confidence and optimism of the early Victorian proponents of British imperialism" toward "self-consciousness and anxiety about colonial domination". She locates this anxiety in what she calls the "rhetoric of excess" that features in the descriptions of cannibalism, and especially in the accounts of Fijian savagery provided by Bloody Bill (most notably that of the sacrifice of children to the eel gods) and the missionary, a representative of the London Missionary Society, an "emblematic figure of colonial fiction". Others have also linked popular boys' fiction of the period with imperialism; Joseph Bristow's Empire Boys (1991) claimed to see an "'imperialist manhood,' which shaped British attitudes towards empire and masculinity." The novel's portrayal of Pacific culture and the effects of colonisation are analyzed in studies such as Brian Street's The Savage in Literature: Representations of 'primitive society in English Fiction (1975) and Rod Edmond's Representing the South Pacific: Colonial Discourse from Cook to Gauguin (1998). The domination imposed by "geographical mapping of a territory and policing of its native inhabitants" is an important theme in the novel both specifically and in general, in the topography of the island as mapped by the boys and the South Pacific's "eventual subjugation and conversion to Christianity", a topic continued in Stevenson's Treasure Island.

The exploration of the relationship between nature and evangelical Christianity is another typically Victorian theme. Coral connects the two ideas. Literary critic Katharine Anderson explains that coral jewellery, popular in the period, had a "pious significance". (Note: The Victorian love of coral jewellery was at its height from the 1840s to the 1850s, perhaps prompted by the coral ornaments presented by her husband to his royal bride, the Duchess d'Aumale, at their wedding in Naples in 1844.) The "enchanted garden" of coral the boys discover at the bottom of their island's lagoon is suggestive of "missionary encounters with the societies of the Pacific Island". In Victorian society coral had been given an "evangelical framing", and the little "coral insect" responsible for building coral reefs (Note: "Coral insect" was a term commonly used in Ballantyne's time to describe the coral polyps the remains of which form the coral; they were not considered to be literally insects.) mirrored the "child reader's productive capacity as a fundraiser for the missionary cause"; literary critic Michelle Elleray discusses numerous children's books from the early to mid-19th century, including The Coral Island, in which coral plays such an educational role.

The novel's setting provides the backdrop for a meditation in the style of Jean-Jacques Rousseau, who promoted an educational setting in which lessons are provided by direct interactions with the natural world rather than by books and coercive teachers. Singh points out that Rousseau, in Emile, or On Education, promotes the reading and even imitation of Robinson Crusoe; literary critic Fiona McCulloch argues that the unmediated knowledge the boys gain on their coral island resembles the "direct language for children" Rousseau advocates in Emile.

== Critical reception ==
The Coral Island was an almost instant success, and was translated into almost every European language within fifty years of its publication. It was widely admired by its contemporary readers, although modern critics view the text as featuring "dated colonialist themes and arguably racist undertones". Ballantyne's blend of blood-thirsty adventure and pious imperialism appealed not just to his target juvenile audience but also to their parents and teachers. He is today mainly remembered for The Coral Island, to the exclusion of much of his other work.

The novel was still considered a classic for English primary school children in the early 20th century. In the United States it was long a staple of suggested reading lists for high-school students; such a list, discussed in a 1915 article in The English Journal, recommends the novel in the category "Stories for Boys in Easy Style". A simplified adaptation of the book was recommended in the 1950s for American 12–14 year olds. Although mostly neglected by modern scholars, in 2006 it was voted one of the top twenty Scottish novels at the 15th International World Wide Web Conference.

== Influence ==
Robert Louis Stevenson's 1882 novel Treasure Island was in part inspired by The Coral Island, which he admired for its "better qualities", as was J. M. Barrie's character Peter Pan; both Stevenson and Barrie had been "fervent boy readers" of the novel. Novelist G. A. Henty was also influenced by Ballantyne's audience-friendly method of didactism.

William Golding's 1954 novel Lord of the Flies was written as a counterpoint to (or even a parody of) The Coral Island, and Golding makes explicit references to it. At the end of the novel, for instance, one of the naval officers who rescues the children mentions the book, commenting on the hunt for one of their number, Ralph, as a "jolly good show. Like the Coral Island". Jack also makes an appearance in Lord of the Flies as Jack Merridew, representing the irrational nature of the boys. Indeed, Golding's three central characters – Ralph, Simon and Jack – are caricatures of Ballantyne's heroes. Despite having enjoyed The Coral Island many times as a child, Golding strongly disagreed with the views that it espoused, and in contrast Lord of the Flies depicts the English boys as savages themselves, who forget more than they learn, unlike Ballantyne's boys. Golding described the relationship between the two books by saying that The Coral Island "rotted to compost" in his mind, and in the compost "a new myth put down roots". Neither is the idyllic nature of Ballantyne's coral island to be found on Stevenson's treasure island, which is unsuitable for settlement "but exists merely as a site from which to excavate treasure, a view consistent with the late-Victorian imperial mission" according to Honaker.

== Television adaptations ==
The Coral Island was adapted into a children's television series in a joint venture between Thames Television and the Australian Broadcasting Corporation in 1980, first shown on Australian and British television in 1983. It was also adapted into a four-part children's television drama by Zenith Productions, broadcast by ITV in 2000.
