= Noel Road =

Street in the London Borough of Islington

Coordinates: 51.53319°N 0.09988°W

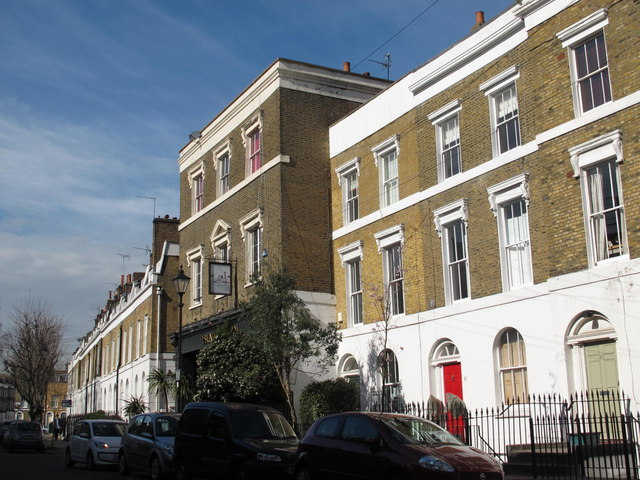
Noel Road, showing The Island Queen, in 2014

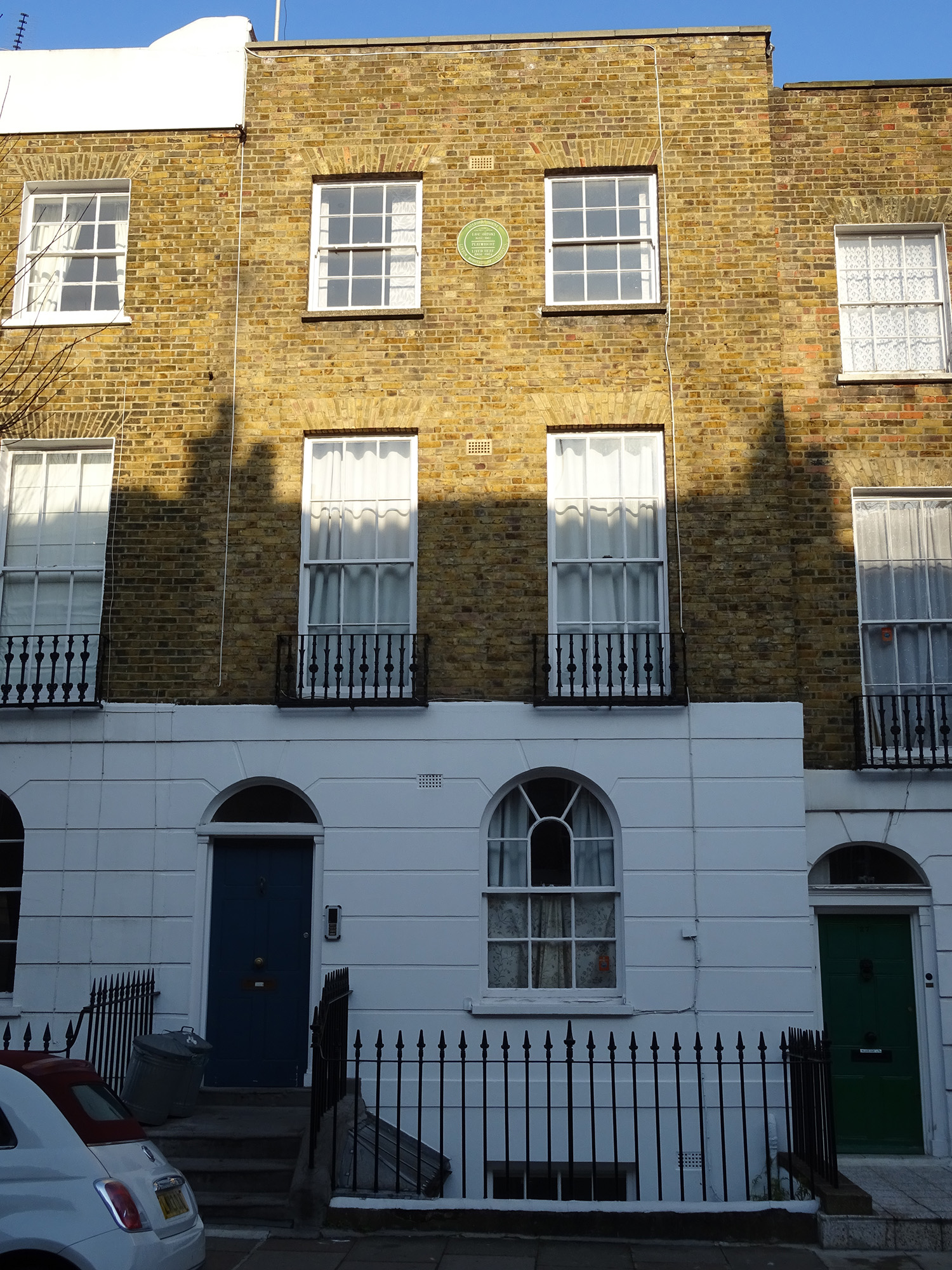
25 Noel Road, home to Joe Orton, in 2017

Noel Road is a street in Islington, London. It runs roughly west to east from Colebrooke Row to St Peter's Street (and crosses Danbury Street), and the houses on the south side back onto the Regent's Canal. It was developed in 1841; and until 1938 was two streets, Noel Street and Hanover Street.

Many of its buildings are listed with Historic England. Former residents include the novelist George Gissing, artist Walter Sickert, playwright Joe Orton, and the author Nina Bawden. In 1967, Orton was murdered in his flat at 25 Noel Road by his long-term partner Kenneth Halliwell, who committed suicide shortly after.

== History ==
The street was developed in 1841; and until 1938 was two streets, Noel Street and Hanover Street, each side of the current junction with Danbury Street. It was named after Noel Thornhill; and a Captain Noel Thornhill, nephew of Arthur John Thornhill, died in 1955, aged 73.

== Buildings ==
Seven to nine, 13–53, 4–6, 12–54, 55–85, Hanover Primary School and The Island Queen pub are all Grade II listed buildings at Historic England's National Heritage List for England. Hanover Street School was designed by E. R. Robson, and opened in 1877. It was rebuilt in 1931, and the architect was then Edwin Paul Wheeler.

== Former residents ==
The novelist George Gissing (1875–1903) lived at 5 Hanover Street (now 60 Noel Road) from 1879 to 1880.

The playwright Joe Orton and his long-term partner Kenneth Halliwell lived in the top floor flat at 25 Noel Road from 1959 until 9 August 1967, when Halliwell killed the 34-year-old Orton there with nine hammer blows to the head, and then killed himself with an overdose of Nembutal.

The writer Lionel Hale (1909–1977) spent his later years at 76 Noel Road. The author Nina Bawden lived at 22 Noel Road for 36 years, from 1976 until her death in 2012.

Walter Sickert resided at number 56 Noel Road (now 54 Noel Road, but then 26 Noel Street) from 1925 to 1926. His painting The Hanging Gardens of Islington, is how he saw his back garden from Vincent Terrace across the other side of Regent's Canal, and Fading Memories of Walter Scott depicts local scenes.
