= The Island Queen, Islington =

Listed pub in London, England

The Island Queen
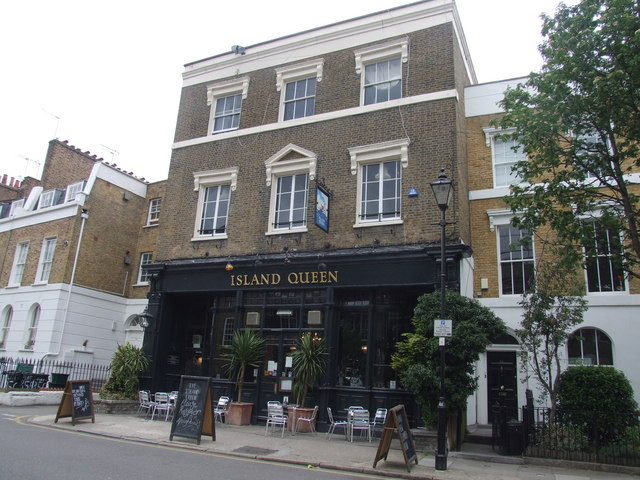
- The pub in 2009

General information
- Type: Public house
- Location: 87 Noel Road, Islington, London, England
- Coordinates: 51.533203°N 0.098463388°W
- Year built: 1851; 175 years ago
- Renovated: c. 1889 and 1897 (interior altered); 2023 (refurbished)
- Owner: Mitchells & Butlers

Design and construction
- Designations

Listed Building – Grade II
- Official name: The Island Queen public house
- Designated: 24 May 2000
- Reference no.: 1379875

Website
- theislandqueenislington.co.uk#/

The Island Queen is a Grade II listed public house on Noel Road in Islington, London, England. Built in 1851 and remodelled internally in the late 19th century, it retains a historic interior recognised by the Campaign for Real Ale (CAMRA) as being of "outstanding national historic importance". The pub is included in CAMRA's National Inventory of Historic Pub Interiors with a three-star rating and is said to be the only pub in Britain named after the Island Queen sidewheel steamboats of the Mississippi and Ohio rivers.

== History ==
The building was constructed in 1851 as a public house with accommodation above and underwent significant internal remodelling around 1889 and 1897. It is said to be the only pub in Britain named after the Island Queen sidewheel steamboats that operated on the Mississippi and Ohio rivers.

On 24 May 2000, the Island Queen was designated a Grade II listed building. It is regarded by the Campaign for Real Ale (CAMRA) as having an interior of "outstanding national historic importance" and is rated three stars on its National Inventory of Historic Pub Interiors.

Following a refurbishment, the pub reopened in 2023. The same year, it received a CAMRA 50th Anniversary Award in recognition of its inclusion in the first edition of the Good Beer Guide and its continuous sale of cask ale since that time. Charrington's IPA was the cask beer available when the guide was first published. As of October 2026 the freehold was owned by Mitchells & Butlers.

== Architecture ==
=== Exterior ===
The building has a stock-brick façade with a rendered sill band, together with a cornice that extends across the front elevation and part of the right-hand side. Rectangular in plan, it has its principal entrance on the right-hand side. The ground floor retains a timber-and-glass pub frontage, incorporating curved display windows, a central entrance that has since been blocked, and a secondary side entrance. Slender mullions divide the frontage and are treated as columns, while a dentilled cornice runs above a row of small toplights. The composition is completed by panelled stallrisers, pilasters with Corinthian capitals, and a recessed entrance.

The upper floors are arranged in a symmetrical three-bay composition. First-floor windows have margin-light glazing and are centred on a pediment, while both the first and second-floor openings have projecting lintels supported by console brackets. To the rear, sash windows survive beneath gauged brick arches, including examples with margin-light glazing at first-floor level.

A projecting rear ablution block had been added by 1897, although it does not appear on an 1873 plan of the site.

=== Interior ===
The interior retains much of its late 19th-century character and is now entered from the right-hand side. At its centre is an original island bar with a small bar-back and optic stand, although the supporting cradle is a later addition. Other surviving features include cast-iron columns with Corinthian capitals, a decorative lincrusta ceiling, and dado panelling around the principal bar area.

The rear bar contains a collection of mirrors dating from around 1900 and retains a late 19th-century fireplace with a round-arched grate. Near the entrance, sections of the original partitioning survive, although some of the glazing has been renewed. Part of the original frieze moulding also survives behind a later food counter.

To the rear, a pool room retains early 20th-century timber panelling. A staircase with late 19th-century dado panelling provides access to the upper floors. Beneath the building is a series of cellars extending under the roadway, which originally also accommodated a kitchen and pot room.

== See also ==
- List of pubs in London
