= The Gorilla Hunters =

1861 novel by Robert Michael Ballantyne

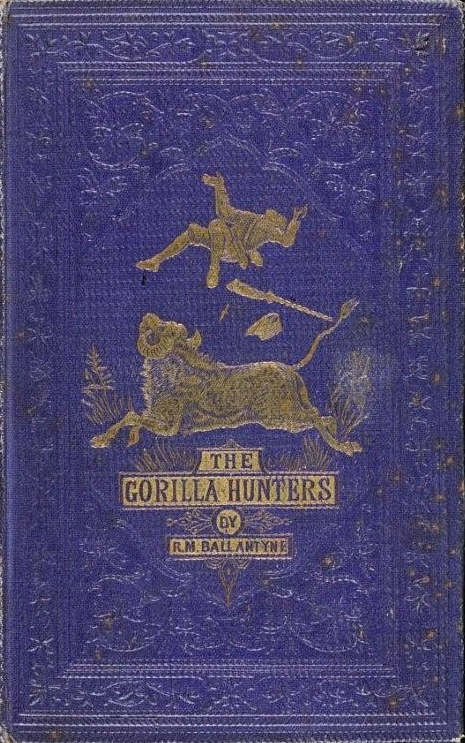
- First edition (1861)
- Author: R. M. Ballantyne
- Language: English
- Genre: Adventure novel
- Publisher: T. Nelson & Sons
- Publication date: 1861
- Media type: Print (hardback and paperback)

The Gorilla Hunters: A Tale of the Wilds of Africa (1861) is a boys' adventure novel by Scottish author R. M. Ballantyne. A sequel to his hugely successful 1858 novel The Coral Island and set in "darkest Africa", its main characters are the earlier novel's three boys: Ralph, Peterkin and Jack. The book's themes are similar to those of The Coral Island, in which the boys testify to the positive influence of missionary work among the natives. Central in the novel is the hunt for gorillas, an animal until recently unknown to the Western world, which came to play an important role in contemporary debates on evolution and the relation between white Westerners and Africans.

== Plot ==
After their adventures in the South Sea Islands, Jack Martin, Ralph Rover, and Peterkin Gay go their separate ways. Six years later, Ralph (again the narrator), living on his father's inheritance on England's west coast and occupying himself as a naturalist, is visited by Peterkin, whose "weather-beaten though ruddy countenance" he does not recognise. Peterkin, who has stayed in touch with Jack, has hunted and killed every animal on Earth except for the gorilla and now comes to Ralph to entice him on a new adventure. After Peterkin writes him a letter, Jack joins the two, and they leave for Africa.

The three pick up a native guide and attend an elephant hunt. All kinds of animals are shot, killed, eaten, and stuffed, and the action is interspersed with sometimes serious, sometimes jocular conversation. Ralph theorises at length on "muffs", which he defines as boys who are too gentle and mild and should be made to undergo physically challenging training. Trading habits in this part of Africa are discussed: trade between the jungle and the coast is done via all the intermediary tribes, a cumbersome and expensive way of doing business. The trader who explains this to Ralph is a friend of missionary efforts: when the natives are ruled by their "abominable superstitions", they become "incarnate fiends, and commit deeds of cruelty that make one's blood run cold to think of". In addition, the trader argues that missionary work and trade should join to improve the fate of Africa: "No good will ever be done in this land, to any great extent, until traders and missionaries go hand in hand into the interior, and the system of trade is entirely remodelled".

In the village of King Jambai, the hunters are well received (boiled elephant foot is served and judged delicious), but problems arise when a young woman, betrothed to Makarooroo, their English-speaking guide, is judged by the village's "fetishman" to be responsible for an illness of the king's, and she is to die. The hunters help spring her from her jail, and in the melee that accompanies their escape two natives are killed: Jack trips one who falls to an accidental death in a pit, and Makarooroo kills another. They hide the woman a few days later with Mbango, the king of another tribe. Peterkin shoots an elephant, but a further hunting adventure goes badly for Jack, who went giraffe hunting by himself but is seriously injured by a rhinoceros. To recuperate the hunters spend a few weeks in the village of another tribe, ruled by a relative of King Jambai.

The plot for the second half of the book involves a slave trader, whom the three hunters and their guide pursue for weeks to prevent the trader and his gang from taking over and enslaving Mbango's people. They are too late, and Makarooroo's fiancée is among the captured. When the trader attacks Jambai's village the three organise the defences and successfully defeat the attackers. It is a relatively bloodless affair since Jack has ensured that the first volley from Jambai's riflemen consists of wadded paper, intended to scare off the attackers without killing them. In addition, Peterkin dresses up in a colourful outfit and stands on top of a hill, screaming and setting off fireworks. However, when Ralph attacks the trader's camp, he manages to scare off the now-liberated slaves, and another weeks-long pursuit ends with the happy reunion of Makarooroo and his fiancée, who head down to the (Christianized) coast to get married. After the three take receipt of their stuffed trophies, intended for British museums and schools, they head home, with Ralph and Peterkin saying farewell:

"Farewell," said I, as we leaned over the vessel's side and gazed sadly at the receding shore --- "farewell to you, kind missionaries and faithful negro friends."

"Ay," added Peterkin, with a deep sigh, "and fare-you-well, ye monstrous apes; gorillas, fare-you-well!"

== Background ==
=== Evolution theory ===
The interest in gorillas among Ballantyne's contemporaries is partly explained by what the resemblance between the great apes and men had to say about evolution. Ballantyne had long been interested in various theories of evolution, an interest evident in The Coral Island and other books: natural and Social Darwinism form a scientific and social background for that novel. Ideas published in Darwin's Origin of Species were in broad circulation before the book's 1859 publication, and The Coral Island reflects the then prevalent view of evolutionary theory; the Victorian age based its imperialist ideology in part on the idea that evolution had resulted in "white, English superiority that was anchored in the notion of a civilized nation elected by God to rule inferior peoples." Besides Darwin himself, Ballantyne had been reading books by Darwin's rival Alfred Russel Wallace, and in later publications also acknowledged the naturalist Henry Ogg Forbes.

=== The gorilla ===
The gorilla, knowledge of which was first spread in Europe in 1847, was responsible for further speculation in England about the evolutionary status of humans. In fact, many exploratory accounts by Westerners, as was argued by Jennifer Dickenson, "are permeated with 'gothic tropes—boundary transgressions, dark doubles, haunting pasts, and threats of regression—in order to play upon Victorian anxieties about the origins of man' in the aftermath of the publication of Darwin's The Origin of Species" (quoted in Giles-Vernick and Rupp). The arrival in England of Paul Du Chaillu, an anthropologist who had observed and studied gorillas in West Africa, prompted great public interest in the relation between gorillas and humans. Ballantyne was so "stimulated" by Du Chaillu's work (his direct inspiration) that he published two novels in 1861 dealing with gorillas, The Red Eric and The Gorilla Hunters. The idea of an imaginary double consisting of gorilla and hunter most likely resulted from the work of American missionary and naturalist Thomas S. Savage, who was the first (with Jeffries Wyman) to name the animal, in 1847, and explicitly set it in opposition to the hunter:

They are exceedingly ferocious, and always offensive in their habits, never running from man as does the Chimpanzee ... The hunter awaits his approach with his gun extended; if his aim is not sure he permits the animal to grasp the barrel, and as he carries it to his mouth (which is his habit) he fires; should the gun fail to go off, the barrel (that of an ordinary musket, which is thin) is crushed between his teeth, and the encounter soon proves fatal to the hunter.

It was this image of the gorilla that became "a staple of adventure fiction", including Du Chaillu's works and Ballantyne's The Gorilla Hunters. As John Miller argues, the figures of the hunter and the gorilla occur in a kind of doubling prevalent in Victorian primatology, and especially The Gorilla Hunters: "this complex relation perhaps most forcefully articulates post-Darwinian anxieties about the fixity of species and the meaning and status of humanity".

Ballantyne already made some errors in his descriptions of nature in The Coral Island, and had apparently resolved whenever possible to write only about things of which he had personal experience. Still, his gorillas are portrayed as dangerous man-eaters, snapping "great branches" in two while pursued by hunters; as a gorilla nutritionist said "that [Ballantyne's] fictional gorilla likely would have been peacefully nibbling on the branches' leaves". Ballantyne's gorilla, on the contrary, is a "man monkey ... a very unnatural monster".

=== Ballantyne and Africa ===
After The Gorilla Hunters and The Red Eric, Ballantyne continued to be interested in Africa, sharing a Victorian preoccupation with slavery in Africa and activism against the slave trade; this was the theme of his 1873 novel Black Ivory. Hunting also was the subject of Hunting the Lions; or, The Land of the Negro (1869). He visited South Africa and wrote two Cape novels, The Settler and the Savage (1877) and Six Months at the Cape (1878), "both of which were popular but served only to entrench a basically unsympathetic view of blacks and a correspondingly inflated appreciation of white activity at the Cape". In all his novels, the paternalistic relationship between the Christian missionary and the receptive native is a red thread.
