= Island Queen (1925 steamboat) =

American steamboat built in 1925

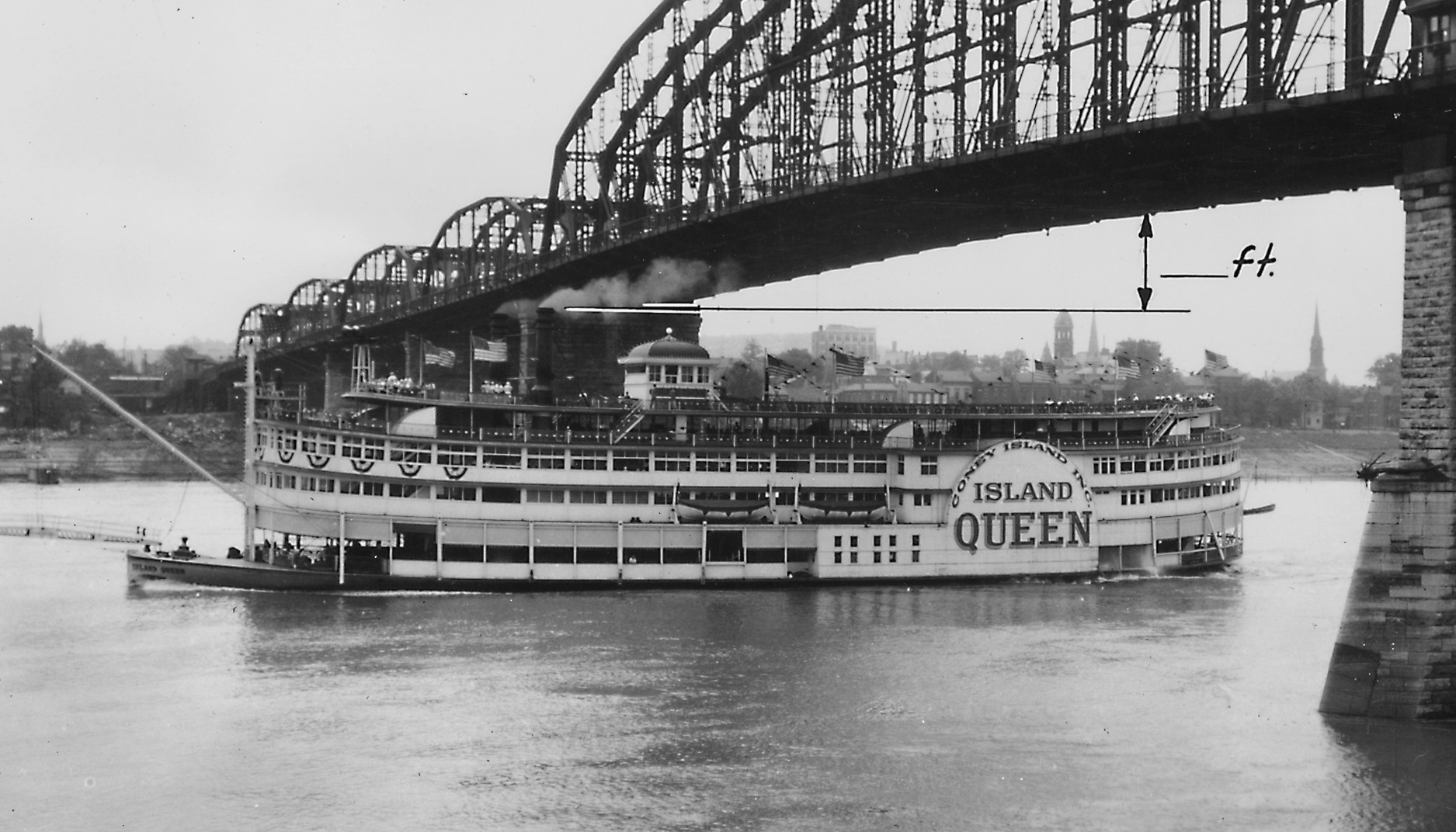
- Island Queen passing under a bridge, 1938

History
- Name: Louisville (yard name); Island Queen (1925)
- Owner: Coney Island Co. (Coney Island, OH)
- Builder: Midland Barge Co. (Midland, PA); Coney Island Co. (Cincinnati, OH)
- Cost: $250,000 ($4,600,000 today)
- Laid down: 1923
- Completed: 1925
- Maiden voyage: 12 April 1925
- Identification: US Registry: #224554

General characteristics
- Tonnage: 986 GRT; 860 NRT
- Length: 286 ft (87 m)
- Beam: 45 ft 6 in (13.87 m)
- Depth: 7 ft 3 in (2.21 m)

Island Queen was a sidewheel steamboat built in 1925. Built to replace an earlier steamer of the same name, she was employed as a passenger boat cruising along the Mississippi and Ohio rivers as both an excursion boat and tramp steamer. Island Queen was destroyed in 1947 when her chief engineer, using a welding torch, accidentally cut into her fuel tank. Reduced to her steel frame, she was scrapped by a local company.

== History ==
Island Queen was built in parts beginning in 1923. Midland Barge Company of Midland, Pennsylvania built her steel hull, designed as a matched pair with the steamboat Cincinnati for the Louisville & Cincinnati Packet Company and John W. Hubbard. After taking delivery on the hull and naming the vessel Louisville, the owner instead resold it to the Coney Island Company. Coney Island Company finished the boat in Cincinnati on April 18, 1925. The new Island Queen measured 285 feet (87 m) long and could carry 4,000 people. The 1,000-ton sidewheeler was powered by oil-burning steam engines with six boilers. It was fully completed and christened in Cincinnati by the Coney Island Company on April 18, 1925.

Like her predecessor, Island Queen was used for excursions to Coney Island amusement park and tramping between New Orleans, and as far upstream as Pittsburgh, Pennsylvania.

Coney Island Company hired musicians to entertain the passengers. Sidney Desvigne, a coronet player from New Orleans, recruited musicians from his hometown to perform on excursions for the Cincinnati market. In 1929, his band included Henry Julian, Ransom Knowling, Walter "Fats" Pinchon, Percy Servier, and Gene Ware.

While in Pittsburgh, on September 9, 1947, her chief engineer struck her fuel tank with a welding torch, causing a fire and a series of explosions that eventually reduced Island Queen to her steel structure, and killed 19 crew. No passengers were aboard at the time of the fire, but about 40 members of the crew were aboard. Force from the explosions could be felt throughout downtown Pittsburgh, shattering windows in nearby buildings. There were even reports of people being knocked down on streets close to the dock.

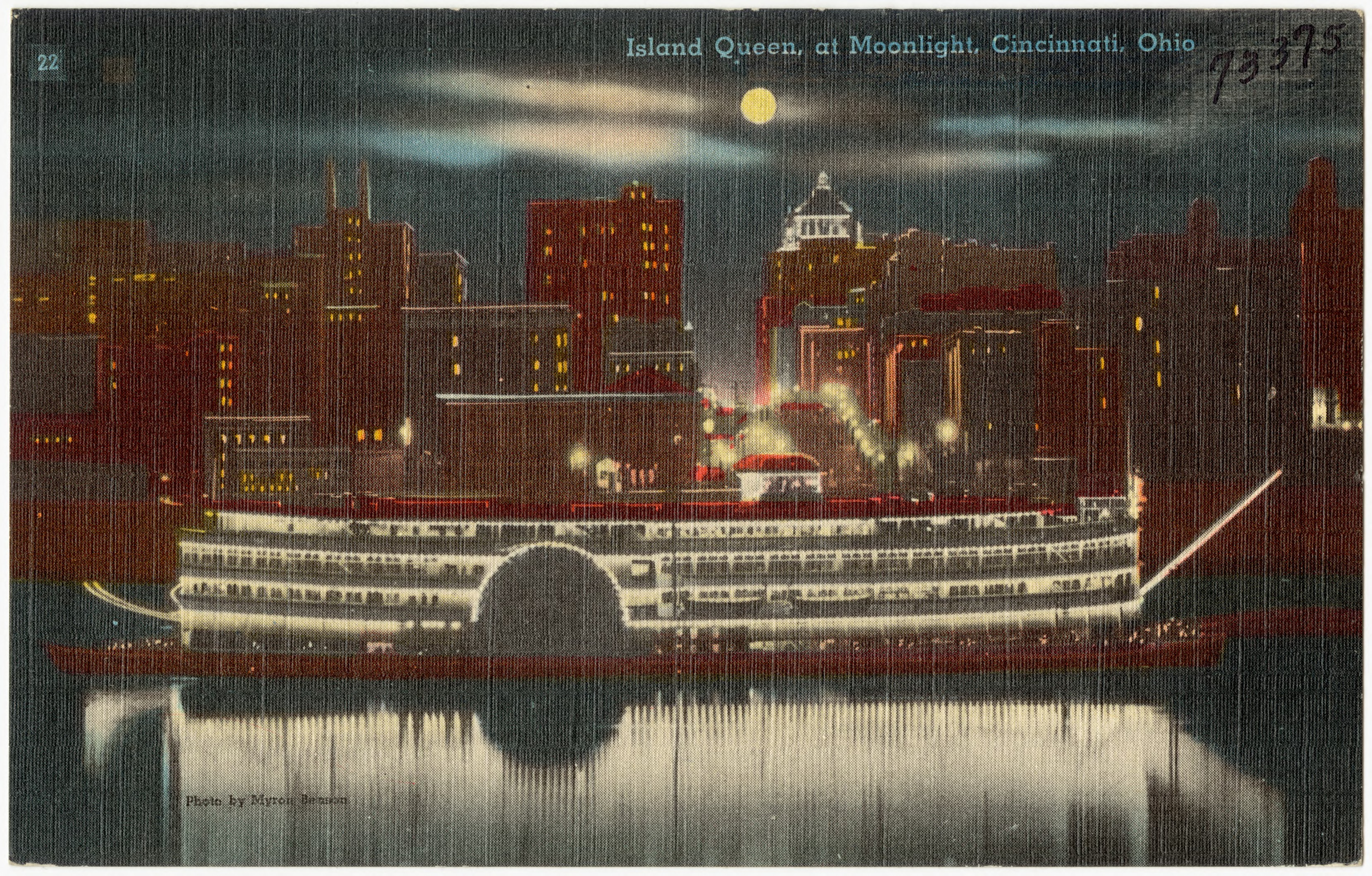
Island Queen, in moonlight, at Cincinnati, Ohio, in the 1930s
