= R. M. Ballantyne =

Scottish writer for young people (1825–1894)

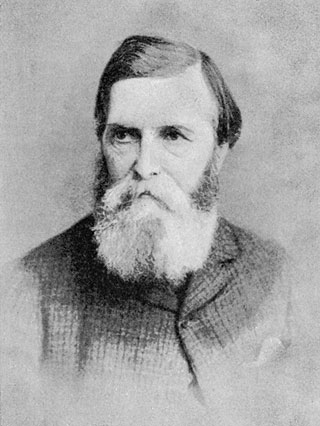
- R. M. Ballantyne, c. 1890
- Born: Robert Michael Ballantyne; 24 April 1825; Edinburgh, Scotland
- Died: 8 February 1894 (aged 68); Rome, Italy
- Occupation: Writer
- Spouse: Jane Grant (m. 1866)
- Children: 6
- Relatives: James Ballantyne (uncle)
- Writing career
- Pen name: Comus
- Genre: Juvenile fiction

Robert Michael Ballantyne (24 April 1825 – 8 February 1894) was a Scottish author of juvenile fiction, who wrote more than a hundred books. He was also an accomplished artist: he exhibited some of his water-colours at the Royal Scottish Academy.

== Early life ==
Ballantyne was born in Edinburgh on 24 April 1825, the ninth of ten children and the youngest son, of Alexander Thomson Ballantyne and his wife Anne. Alexander was a newspaper editor and printer in the family firm of "Ballantyne & Co" based at Paul's Works on the Canongate, and Robert's uncle James Ballantyne was the printer for Scottish author Sir Walter Scott. In 1832-33 the family is known to have been living at 20 Fettes Row, in the northern New Town of Edinburgh. A UK-wide banking crisis in 1825 resulted in the collapse of the Ballantyne printing business the following year with debts of £130,000, which led to a decline in the family's fortunes.

Ballantyne went to Canada aged 16, and spent five years working for the Hudson's Bay Company. He traded with the local First Nations and Native Americans for furs, which required him to travel by canoe and sleigh to the areas occupied by the modern-day provinces of Manitoba, Ontario, and Quebec, experiences that formed the basis of his novel The Young Fur Traders (1856). His longing for family and home during that period impressed him to start writing letters to his mother. Ballantyne recalled in his autobiographical Personal Reminiscences in Book Making (1893) that "To this long-letter writing I attribute whatever small amount of facility in composition I may have acquired."

== Writing career ==
In 1847 Ballantyne returned to Scotland to discover that his father had died. He published his first book the following year, Hudson's Bay: or, Life in the Wilds of North America, and for some time was employed by the publishers Messrs Constable. In 1856, he gave up business to focus on his literary career, and began the series of adventure stories for the young with which his name is popularly associated.

The Young Fur-Traders (1856), The Coral Island (1857), The World of Ice (1859), Ungava: a Tale of Eskimo Land (1857), The Dog Crusoe (1860), The Lighthouse (1865), Fighting the Whales (1866), Deep Down (1868), The Pirate City (1874), Erling the Bold (1869), The Settler and the Savage (1877), and more than 100 other books followed in regular succession, his rule being to write as far as possible from personal knowledge of the scenes he described. The Gorilla Hunters. A tale of the wilds of Africa (1861) shares three characters with The Coral Island: Jack Martin, Ralph Rover and Peterkin Gay. Here Ballantyne relied factually on Paul du Chaillu's Exploration in Equatorial Guinea, which had appeared early in the same year.

The Coral Island is the most popular of the Ballantyne novels still read and remembered today, but because of one mistake he made in that book, in which he gave an incorrect thickness of coconut shells, he subsequently attempted to gain first-hand knowledge of his subject matter. For instance, he spent some time living with the lighthouse keepers at the Bell Rock before writing The Lighthouse, and while researching for Deep Down he spent time with the tin miners of Cornwall.

In 1857–58, Ballantyne wrote several nursery tales under the pseudonym 'Comus', including Three Little Kittens (1857), My Mother (1857), The Butterfly's Ball and the Grasshopper's Feast (1857), Mister Fox (1857), and The Robber Kitten (1858). They were printed by Thomas Nelson and Sons in illustrated editions with verse versions (in the case of The Butterfly's Ball by William Roscoe and My Mother by Ann Taylor) and musical arrangements for piano and for a duet with a child.

In 1866 Ballantyne married Jane Grant, with whom he had three sons and three daughters.

== Later life and death ==
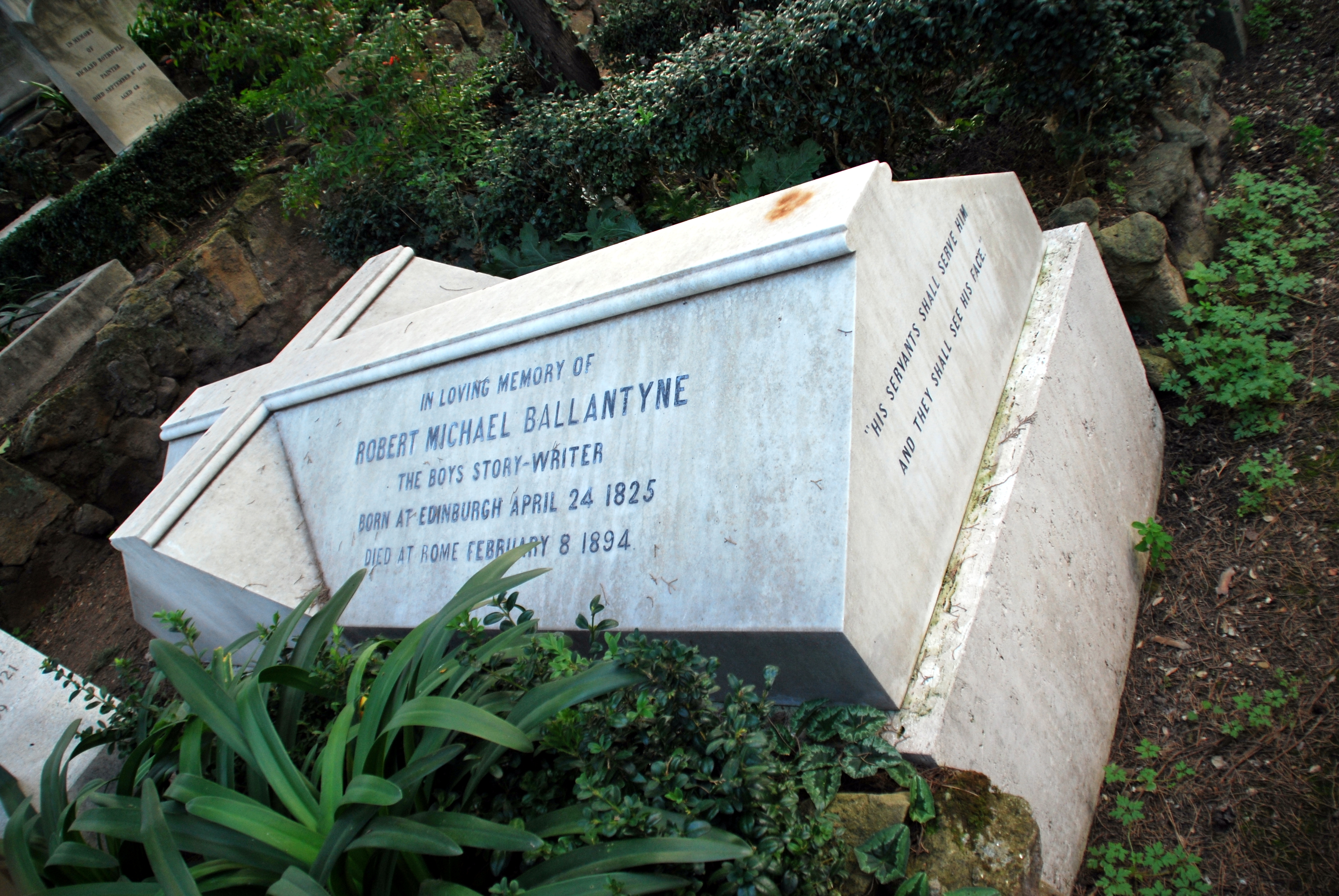
Ballantyne's Grave in Rome

Ballantyne spent his later years in Harrow, London, before moving to Italy for the sake of his health, possibly suffering from undiagnosed Ménière's disease. He died in Rome on 8 February 1894, and was buried in the Protestant Cemetery there.

== Legacy ==
A Greater London Council plaque commemorates Ballantyne at "Duneaves" on Mount Park Road in Harrow.

One of the young men influenced by Ballantyne was Robert Louis Stevenson (1850–94). He was so impressed with the story of The Coral Island (1857) that he based portions of his famous book Treasure Island (1881) on themes found in Ballantyne. He honoured Ballantyne in the introduction to Treasure Island with the following poem:

To the Hesitating Purchaser

If sailor tales to sailor tunes,
Storm and adventure, heat and cold,
If schooners, islands, and maroons,
And buccaneers, and buried gold,
And all the old romance, retold
Exactly in the ancient way,
Can please, as me they pleased of old,
The wiser youngsters of today:

So be it, and fall on! If not,
If studious youth no longer crave,
His ancient appetites forgot,
Kingston, or Ballantyne the brave,
Or Cooper of the wood and wave:
So be it, also! And may I
And all my pirates share the grave
Where these and their creations lie!

== Works ==
- The Hudson's Bay Company (1848)
- The Young Fur Traders (1856)
- Mister Fox. A Children's Nursery Rhyme (1856)
- Ungava (1857)
- The Coral Island (1858)
- Martin Rattler (1858)
- Handbook to the new Goldfields (1858)
- The Dog Crusoe and his Master (1860)
- The World of Ice (1860)
- The Gorilla Hunters (1861)
- The Golden Dream (1861)
- The Red Eric (1861)
- Away in the Wilderness (1863)
- Fighting the Whales (1863)
- The Wild Man of the West (1863)
- Man on the Ocean (1863)
- Fast in the Ice (1863)
- Gascoyne (1864)
- The Lifeboat (1864)
- Chasing the Sun (1864)
- Freaks on the Fells (1864)
- The Lighthouse (1865)
- Fighting The Flames (1867)
- Silver Lake (1867)
- Deep Down (1868)
- Shifting Winds (1868)
- Hunting the Lions (1869)
- Over the Rocky Mountains (1869)
- Saved by the Lifeboat (1869)
- Erling the Bold (1869)
- The Battle and the Breeze (1869)
- Up in the Clouds (1869)
- The Cannibal Islands (1869)
- Lost in the Forest (1869)
- Digging for Gold (1869)
- Sunk at Sea (1869)
- The Floating Light of the Goodwin Sands (1870)
- The Iron Horse (1879)
- The Norsemen in the West (1872)
- The Pioneers (1872)
- Black Ivory (1873)
- Life in the Red Brigade (1873)
- Fort Desolation (1873)
- The Ocean and its Wonders (1874)
- The Pirate City: An Algerine Tale (1874)
- The Butterfly's Ball and the Grasshopper's Feast (1874)
- The Story of the Rock (1875)
- Rivers of Ice (1875)
- Under the Waves (1876)
- The Settler and the Savage (1877)
- In the Track of the Troops (1878)
- Jarwin and Cuffy (1878)
- Philosopher Jack (1879)
- Six Months at the Cape (1879)
- Post Haste (1880)
- The Lonely Island (1880)
- The Red Man's Revenge (1880)
- My Doggie and I (1881)
- The Life of a Ship (1882)
- The Kitten Pilgrims (1882)
- The Giant of the North (1882)
- The Madman and the Pirate (1883)
- Battles with the Sea (1883)
- The Battery and the Boiler (1883)
- The Thorogood Family (1883)
- The Young Trawler (1884)
- Dusty Diamonds, Cut and Polished (1884)
- Twice Bought (1885)
- The Island Queen (1885)
- The Rover of the Andes (1885)
- The Prairie Chief (1886)
- The Lively Poll (1886)
- Red Rooney (1886)
- The Big Otter (1887)
- The Fugitives or the Tyrant Queen of Madagascar (1887)
- Blue Lights (1888)
- The Middy and the Moors (1888)
- The Eagle Cliff (1889)
- The Crew of the Water Wagtail (1889)
- Blown to Bits (1889)
- The Garret and the Garden (1890)
- Jeff Benson (1890)
- Charlie to the Rescue (1890)
- The Coxswain's Bride (1891)
- The Buffalo Runners (1891)
- The Hot Swamp (1892)
- Hunted and Harried (1892)
- The Walrus Hunters (1893)
- An Author's Adventures (1893)
- Wrecked but not Ruined (1895)

=== Example of illustrations from a work by Ballantyne ===
Edgar Giberne provided five illustrations for The Blue Lights or Hot Work in the Soudan: A tale of Soldier life in Several of its Phases by Ballantyne (J. Nisbet & Co., London, 1888)

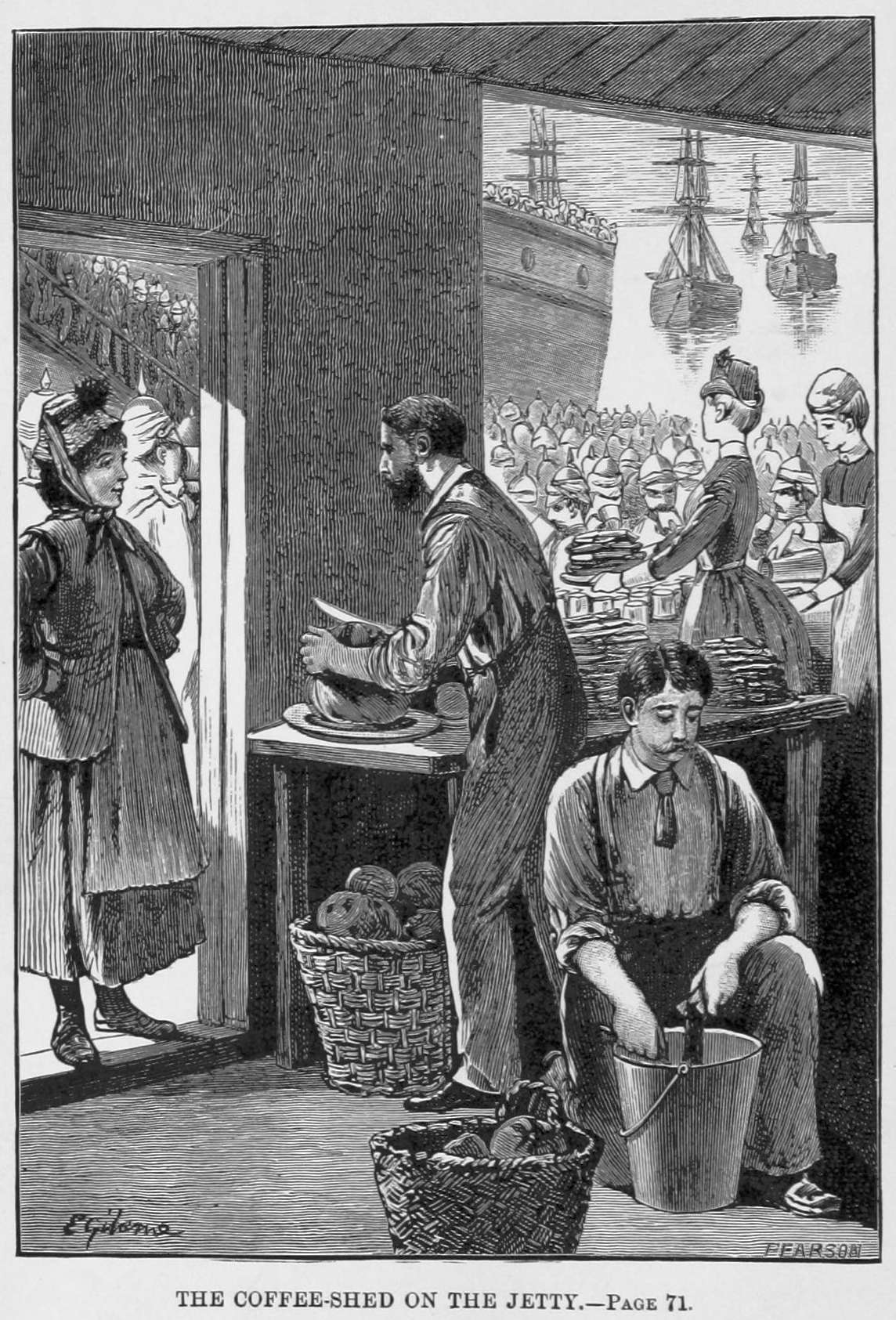
Page-071

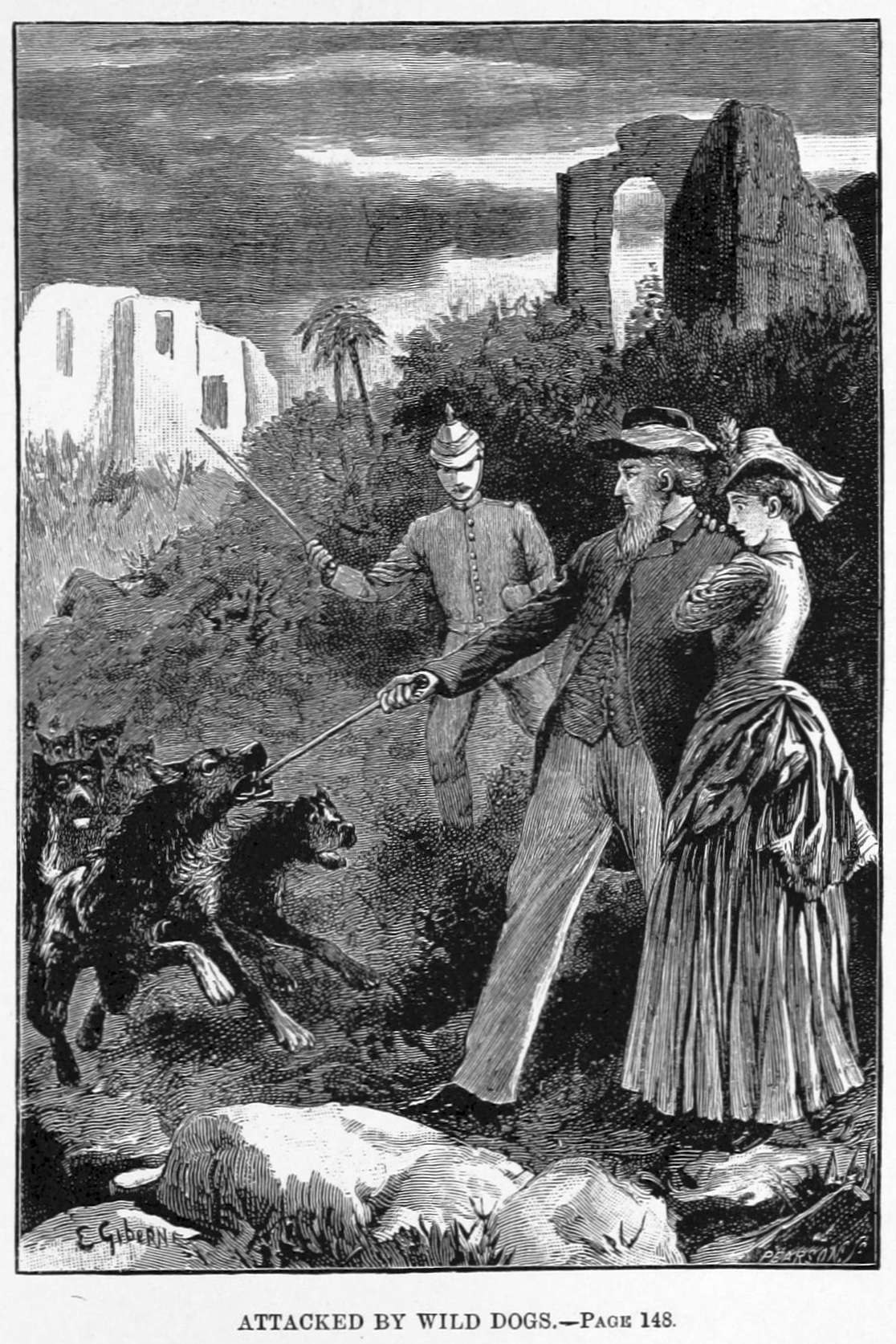
Page-148

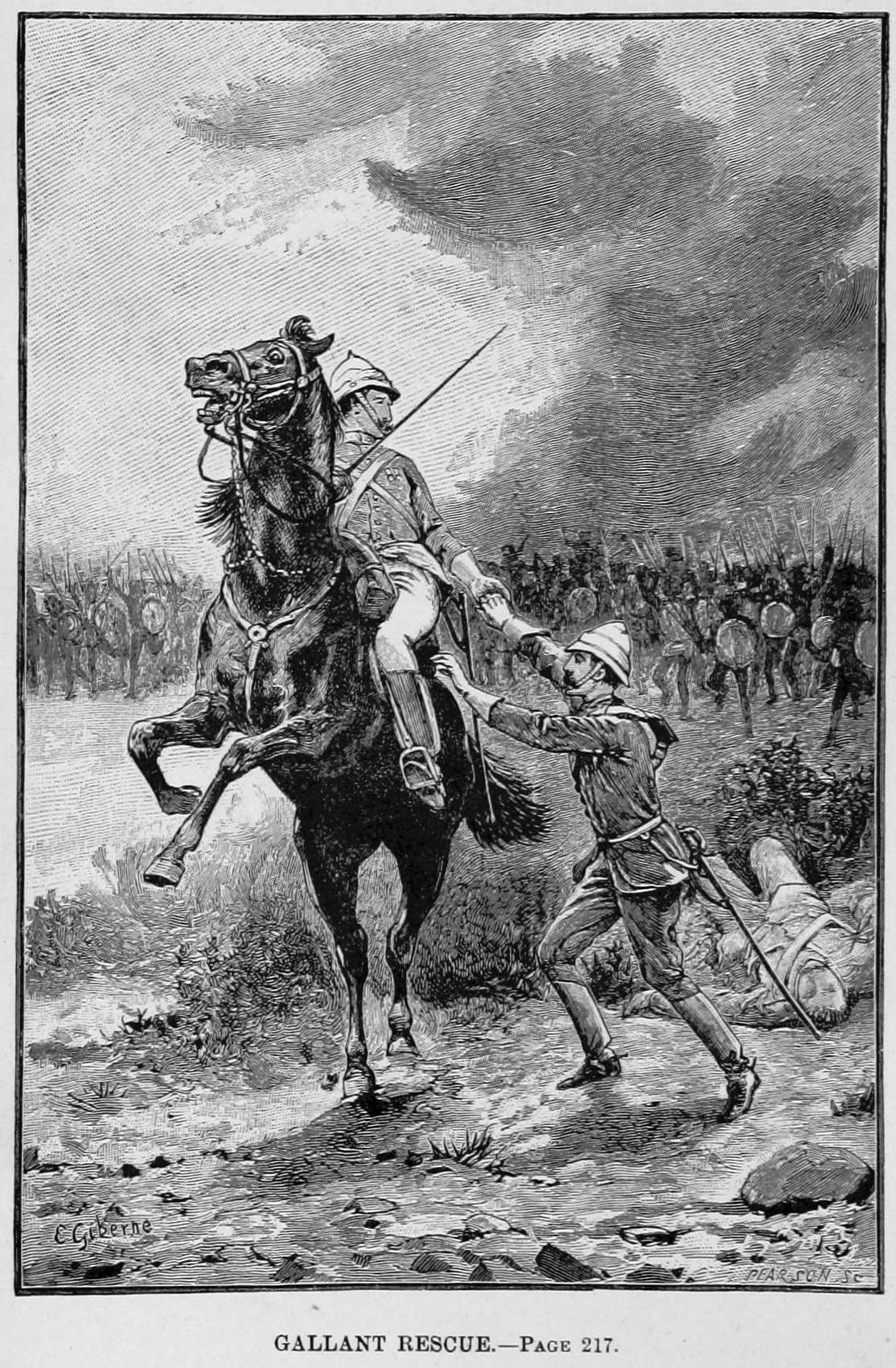
Page-217

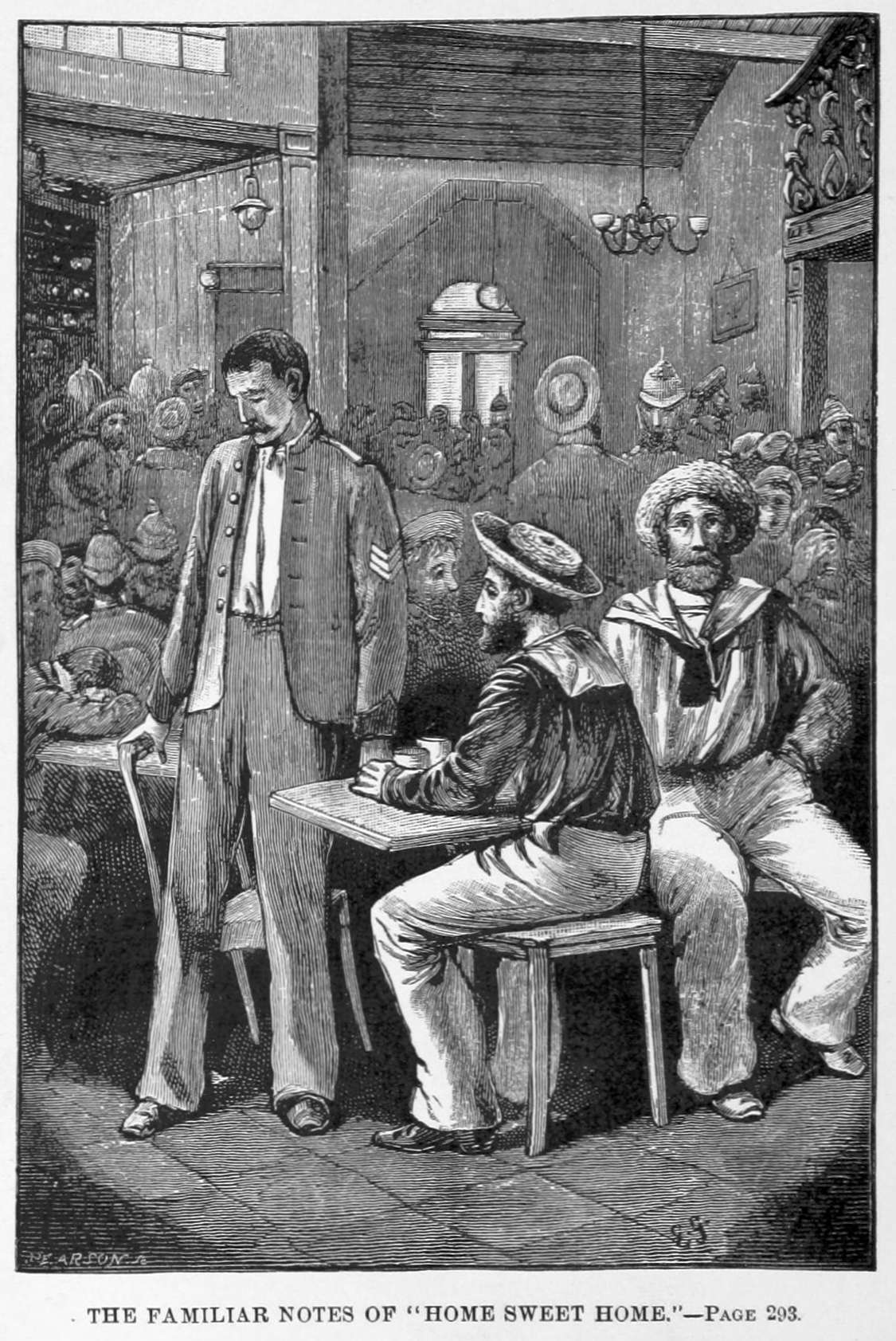
Page-293

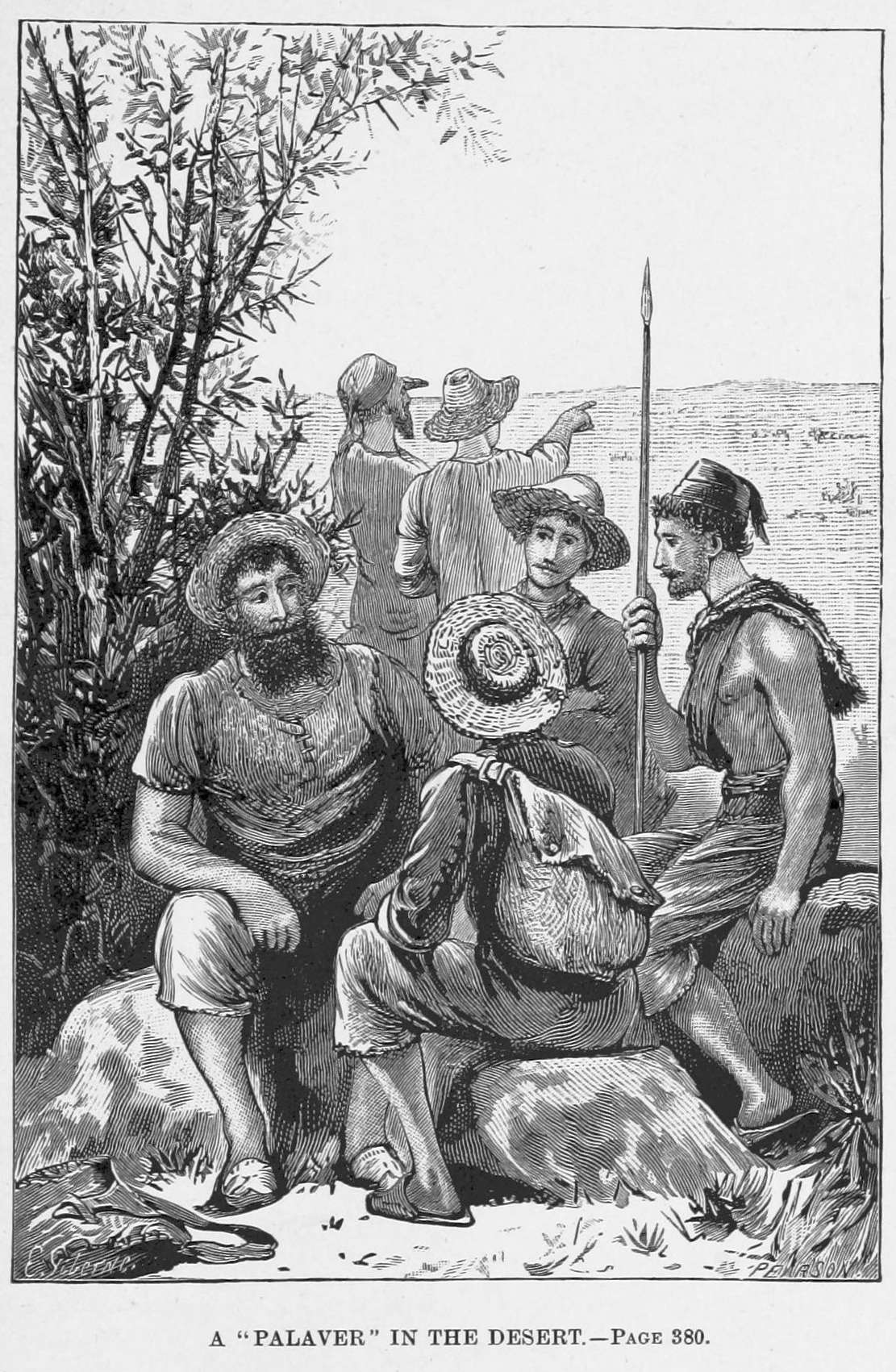
Page-380
