= Eric Quayle =

British bibliophile and author (1921-2001)

Eric Stanley Quayle (1921–2001) was a noted British bibliophile, collector and author.

== Career ==
Quayle's writings were mainly related to the themes of collecting books but he also produced a noted biography (1967) of the Victorian adventure story writer, R. M. Ballantyne, and two books of folk tales: one of Cornish tales (The Magic Ointment) and one of Japanese tales (The Shining Princess). These were both illustrated by the prolific Michael Foreman.

Over his lifetime he built up a substantial collection of books (16,000 volumes at the time of his death), which included many "rare and first editions" covering a wide range of topics in "literature and science" and a collection of children's books with "many titles (...) known by only the single copy in his possession". His collection also included literary ephemera amongst which were materials by and about Ballantyne.

== Personal life ==
Quinton Quayle, the retired British diplomat, was one of Eric's children as was Chrissy Quayle, the musician (The Mermaid of Zennor).

He died in August 2001 in a fall from the cliffs at Zennor Head near his home, Carn Cobba, a house noted for its cliffside gardens and "by an old millstream that overlooks the Atlantic Ocean from the edge of rugged cliffs" seven miles from St Ives, Cornwall.

== Books by Eric Quayle ==
- Ballantyne the Brave: A Victorian Writer and His Family. London: Hart-Davis, 1967.
- R. M. Ballantyne: A Bibliography of First Editions. London: Dawsons of Pall Mall, 1968.
- The Ruin of Sir Walter Scott. London: Rupert Hart-Davis, 1968; New York: Clarkson N. Potter, 1969.
- The Collector's Book of Books. New York: C.N. Potter; London: Studio Vista, 1971.
- The Collector's Book of Children's Books. New York: C. N. Potter; London: Studio Vista, 1971.
- The Collector's Book of Detective Fiction. London: Studio Vista, 1972.
- The Collector's Book of Boys' Stories. London: Studio Vista, 1973.
- Old Cook Books: An Illustrated History. New York: Dutton, 1978.
- Early Children's Books: A Collector's Guide. Newton Abbot, Devon: David & Charles; Totowa, NJ: Barnes & Noble Books, 1983.
- The Magic Ointment and Other Cornish Legends. London: Andersen Press, 1986; London: Macmillan Children's Books, 1988. Illustrated by Michael Foreman.
- The Little People's Pageant of Cornish Legends. New York: Simon & Schuster, 1987 (A Little Simon Book). Illustrated by Michael Foreman.
- The Shining Princess and Other Japanese Legends. London: Andersen Press; New York: Arcade Publishing, 1989. Illustrated by Michael Foreman.
