= The Island Queen (novel) =

1885 novel by R.M. Ballantyne

The Island Queen, or Dethroned by Fire and Water
- Title page for The Island Queen: or Dethroned by Fire and Water: a tale of the Southern Hemisphere (1885)
- Author: R.M. Ballantyne
- Language: English
- Genre: Novel
- Publisher: J. Nisbet
- Publication date: 1885
- Publication place: England
- Pages: 136
- ISBN: 1606643223

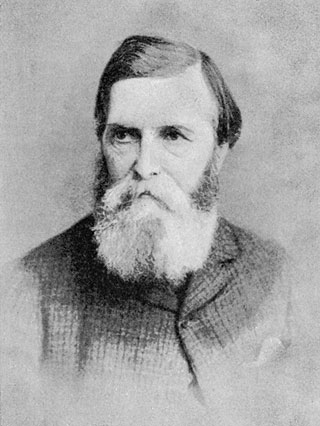
Robert Michael Ballantyne

The Island Queen: or Dethroned by Fire and Water: a tale of the Southern Hemisphere is an 1885 novel written by Scottish author R.M. Ballantyne. The novel first appeared in Volume VI of Young England, an annual magazine published in London from 1880 to 1937. It was then published in paperback by J. Nisbet & Co. This novel was Ballantyne's 79th publication, written in the latter half of his career.

The novel is a castaway / survivalist tale. It tells the story of two brothers and a sister who are stranded on one of the many islands of Oceania. The novel's major themes include 19th century British imperialism, the value of Christianity, and the development of social hierarchies.

Ballantyne published the novel after having moved from Edinburgh to Harrow, a north London borough, to allow his children to finish school in 1873.

== Plot summary ==
The novel begins with the Rigonda family and two men aboard a castaway ship somewhere in the south Pacific. The family finds a hidden cache of food and they land safely on a nearby island.

After finding shelter they set out to explore the island. They soon find that everything they need seems to grow on trees. They explore, hunt wild boar, and construct a signal flag to attract passing ships.

During a tremendous storm, an emigrant ship is wrecked on the coral reef just off the island. Otto and Dominick Rigonda run to aid the passengers.

The two parties become acquainted and work together to build suitable housing. The men begin offloading supplies and constructing makeshift shelters. The women are charged with caring for the children and establishing a domicile.

Dominick and Malines come to blows, which results in Mother Lynch nominating Pauline to be queen. Pauline surprises everyone by naming Joe Binney her prime minister. A few days later, Pauline and Otto are kidnapped by natives and brought aboard their canoe. The colonists give chase and fire a volley at the natives, who allow the children to jump overboard.

A few nights later Malines and his co-conspirators are caught preparing to leave the island without the emigrants. The conspirators are marched back to the camp and put in makeshift jails. Dr. Marsh is appointed as judge over the kangaroo court.

Queen Pauline surprises the community by pardoning the criminals and offers her hand for them to kiss allegiance. For a time thereafter, there is peace, except for a group of natives hiding in the foliage who are dispatched by the gun-toting colonists.

An earthquake strikes suddenly and begins to destroy the colony, and everyone flees in the only intact boat just before the entire island sinks into the sea.

The refugees set sail for their original port, but a storm renders the ship unseaworthy once again and they must pull in to a different port. A ship bound for England is docked there and the Rigondas soon arrange for their passage home to England. The novel ends as the children are finally reunited with their parents, who are none too eager to hear their tales of adventure.

== Characters ==
- Dominick Rigonda is the oldest of the three children. He is portrayed as a logical and responsible boy, doing his best to help his siblings survive.
- Otto Rigonda is the pert, sometimes overconfident middle child. He uses knowledge that he has gleaned from books to help the family.
- Pauline Rigonda is the pretty youngest sister, and is portrayed as very observant and graceful. She undergoes a transformation as the story progresses, becoming wise and regal and settling disputes sensibly.
- Malines is the hardened first mate of an emigrant ship. He is strong and handsome, but surly. He is the villain of the story.
- Mother Lynch plays the matriarch in the story, dealing with everyday tasks and incidents. She is the nurse and chief caregiver.
- Dr. Marsh is deathly ill at the beginning of the story and requires a lot of special care. He and Otto become close friends, and the others respect his judgement.

== Genre and style ==
The story is told through an editorial voice that frequently converses with the reader. The story is narrated in the present tense. There is also a lot of conversation, and Ballantyne advances much of the plot through dialogue. There are strong similarities to earlier Ballantyne novels, and there is a similarity to other stories of the era such as Robinson Crusoe; that is, the main characters are first placed in an unknown or foreign location, where their safety is threatened, before landing on a seemingly deserted island. There is a serious moral tone, but also an exciting story told in an accessible manner via Ballantyne's well-fashioned prose.

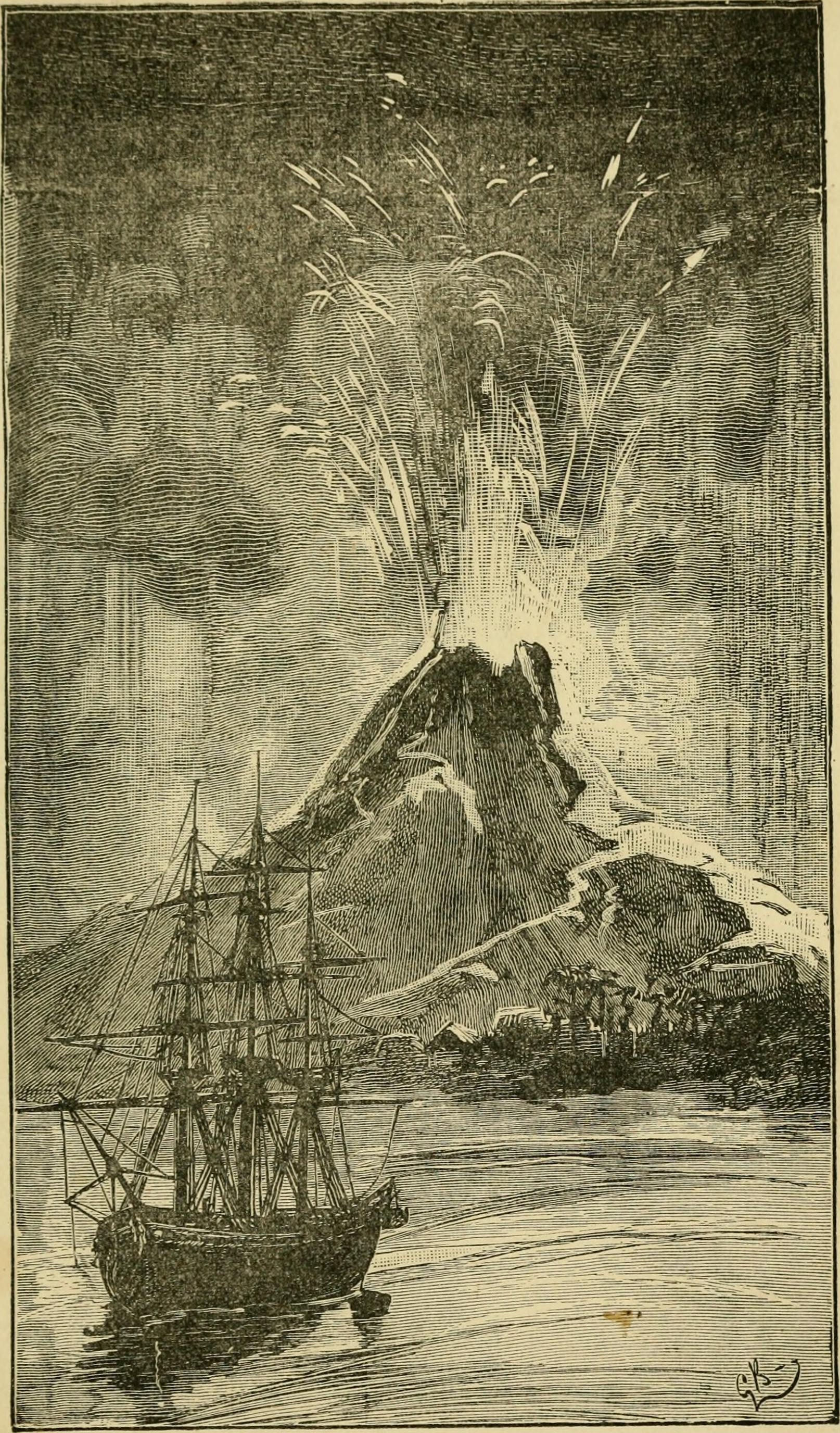
A terrible outburst from the volcano settled the matter

== Researching the setting ==
Ballantyne became one of the first adventure novelists to conduct background research to develop more realistic settings and descriptions for his novels." The resulting realism helped account for the popularity of his novels." He depicted situations as closely as possible to reality.

== Themes ==
Like many of Ballantyne's juvenile adventure novels, a major theme is Christianity. The characters show varying amounts of religious devotion, and Ballantyne uses direct quotes from the bible.

The theme of imperialism, explained by Deborah Anna Logan, arises as the children begin to see themselves as landowners and start to build an empire.

Social hierarchies quickly develop, and the children each play a role in the society which they have devised, based on British government. A contrast is shown between shipboard and civilian authority and organisation.

== Critical reception ==
Ballantyne's books contain more details of the local flora and fauna, as well as moralistic dialogue, than is usual in present-day stories. However, his novels were popular with both children and adults. Most critics agree that his books were very well-researched. The London Quarterly Review criticised the book for overemphasising piety out of keeping with the adventurous spirit of the novel. Michelle Elleray also discussed Ballantyne's overt Christianity and pointed out that he used his novels as a way of providing educational and religious material in an entertaining way. She also points out that Ballantyne's child characters were usually quite self-sufficient and self-directed," having developed their own sense of agency and ability.
