= Joseph Bristow (literary scholar) =

American academic

Joseph Bristow is a professor of English literature at UCLA; he specializes in Nineteenth Century and Twentieth Century British Literature, and sexuality studies. He is most known for his books on the history of sexuality, Victorian poetry, and his work as a critic and editor of late Victorian literary texts.

== Education ==
Bristow received his BA from the University of London, his MA from University of Stirling, and his PhD in English from University of Southampton.

== Scholarship ==
His most important books of criticism include Sexuality (1997), Effeminate England: Homoerotic Writing after 1885 (1997), Empire Boys: Adventures in a Man's World (1991) and Robert Browning: New Readings (1991). He has also served as editor of The Fin-de-Siècle Poem (2005), Oscar Wilde, The Picture of Dorian Gray (2004), Wilde Writings: Contextual Conditions (2003), Wilde Discoveries: Traditions, Histories, Archives (2013), and The Cambridge Companion to Victorian Poetry (2000), among other edited collections.

== Awards ==
Professor Bristow's research has been supported by several fellowships from institutions such as the British Academy, the Wingate Foundation, St John's College, Oxford, National Endowment for the Humanities, and the Stanford Humanities Center.
