= Island Queen (1896 steamboat) =

American steamboat built in 1896

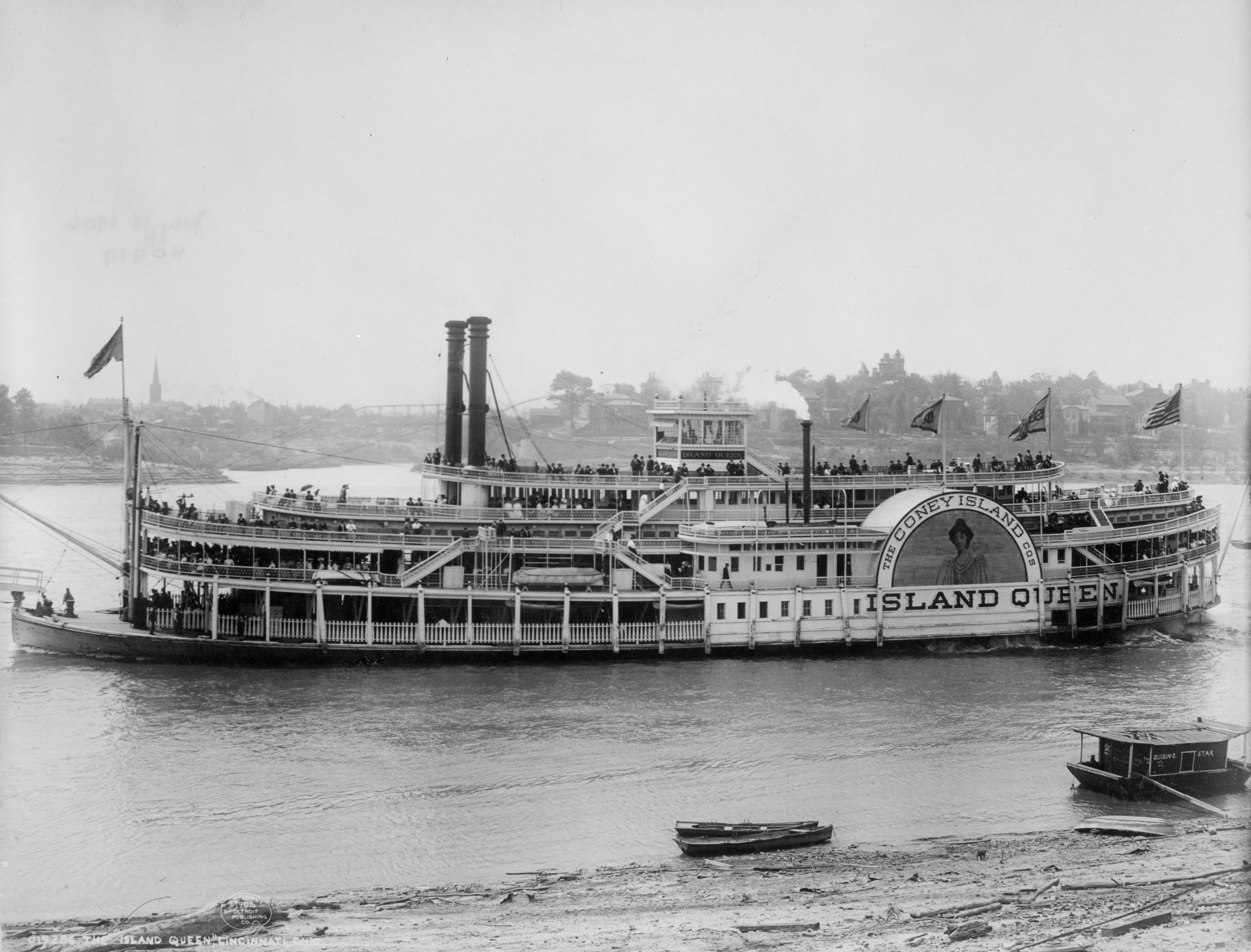
- Island Queen at Cincinnati, Ohio, in 1906

History

United States
- Name: Island Queen
- Owner: Lee H. Brooks, Coney Island Company
- Operator: Sterling McIntyre, James DuPuy
- Route: Ohio River, Mississippi River, Cincinnati to Coney Island
- Builder: Cincinnati Marine Railway Co.
- Launched: May 16, 1896
- In service: 1896
- Out of service: April 27, 1922
- Fate: Severe structural damage sustained by fire, scrapped

General characteristics
- Type: Paddle steamer
- Length: 281.4 ft (85.8 m)
- Beam: 42.6 ft (13.0 m)
- Depth of hold: 8.5 ft (2.6 m)
- Decks: 3 cabin deck
- Installed power: Compound non-condensing engines; 20 & 35-inch bore by 9 ft stroke; 6 × boilers, 24 ft × 42 inch
- Propulsion: Sidewheels
- Capacity: about 4,100 passengers

Island Queen was a sidewheel steamboat built in Cincinnati, Ohio in 1896. She operated as a passenger boat cruising along the Mississippi and Ohio rivers as both an excursion boat and tramp steamer. Island Queen burned in 1922 in a fire which destroyed several other vessels. A second Island Queen was built in 1925 to replace the original.

== History ==
Island Queen was owned by Coney Island Company and used to ferry passengers between Cincinnati and Coney Island amusement park. She was christened May 16, 1896 by the daughter of Lee H Brooks, Coney Island Company's chairman.

In off-seasons when the park was closed she operated as a tramp steamer on the Mississippi and Ohio rivers, going as far downstream as New Orleans. On April 27, 1922, her forward hurricane deck collapsed, injuring 27 children and paralyzing one. That same year on November 4, Island Queen was severely burned and decommissioned after a fire engulfed several steamboats in Cincinnati harbor.
