= Tony Award for Best Musical =

Award for best Broadway musical

- Awarded for: Best Musical
- Location: New York City
- Presented by: American Theatre Wing, The Broadway League
- Currently held by: Schmigadoon! (2026)
- Website: TonyAwards.com

The Tony Award for Best Musical is given annually to the best new Broadway musical, as determined by Tony Award voters. The award is one of the ceremony's longest-standing awards, having been presented each year since 1949. The award goes to the producers of the winning musical. A musical is eligible for consideration in a given year if it has not previously been produced on Broadway and is not "determined... to be a 'classic' or in the historical or popular repertoire", otherwise it may be considered for Best Revival of a Musical.

Best Musical is the final award presented at the Tony Awards ceremony. Excerpts from the musicals that are nominated for this award are usually performed during the ceremony before this award is presented.

This is a list of winners and nominees for the Tony Award for Best Musical.

== Winners and nominees ==
=== 1940s ===
Year	Musical	Producer(s)
1949 (3rd)
1949 (3rd)	Kiss Me, Kate; Book by Bella and Samuel Spewack, Music & Lyrics by Cole Porter	Saint Subber and Lemuel Ayers

=== 1950s ===
Year	Musical	Producer(s)
1950 (4th)
1950 (4th)	South Pacific; Book by Oscar Hammerstein II and Joshua Logan, Music by Richard Rodgers, Lyrics by Hammerstein	Leland Hayward, Joshua Logan, Rodgers and Hammerstein
1951 (5th)
1951 (5th)	Guys and Dolls; Book by Abe Burrows and Jo Swerling, Music & Lyrics by Frank Loesser	Cy Feuer & Ernest H. Martin
1952 (6th)
1952 (6th)	The King and I Book & Lyrics by Oscar Hammerstein II, Music by Richard Rodgers	Rodgers and Hammerstein
1953 (7th)
1953 (7th)	Wonderful Town; Book by Jerome Chodorov and Joseph Fields, Music by Leonard Bernstein, Lyrics by Betty Comden and Adolph Green	Robert Fryer
1954 (8th)
1954 (8th)	Kismet; Book by Luther Davis and Charles Lederer, Music by Alexander Borodin, Adaptation and Lyrics by Chet Forrest and Robert Wright	Charles Lederer
1955 (9th)
1955 (9th)	The Pajama Game; Book by George Abbott and Richard Pike Bissell, Music & Lyrics by Richard Adler and Jerry Ross	Frederick Brisson, Robert E. Griffith, & Harold Prince
1956 (10th)
1956 (10th)	Damn Yankees; Book by George Abbott and Douglass Wallop, Music & Lyrics by Richard Adler and Jerry Ross	Frederick Brisson, Robert E. Griffith, & Harold Prince in association with Albert B. Taylor
1956 (10th)	Pipe Dream; Book & Lyrics by Oscar Hammerstein II, Music by Richard Rodgers	Rodgers and Hammerstein
1957 (11th)
1957 (11th)	My Fair Lady; Book & Lyrics by Alan Jay Lerner, Music by Frederick Loewe	Herman Levin
1957 (11th)	Bells Are Ringing; Book & Lyrics by Betty Comden and Adolph Green, Music by Jule Styne	The Theatre Guild
1957 (11th)	Candide; Book by Lillian Hellman, Music by Leonard Bernstein, Lyrics by Richard Wilbur	Ethel Linder Reiner in association with Lester Osterman Jr.
1957 (11th)	The Most Happy Fella; Book, Music, & Lyrics by Frank Loesser	Kermit Bloomgarden and Lynn Loesser
1958 (12th)
1958 (12th)	The Music Man; Story by Franklin Lacey and Meredith Willson, Book, Music & Lyrics by Willson	Kermit Bloomgarden and Herbert Greene in association with Frank Productions
1958 (12th)	Jamaica; Book by Yip Harburg and Fred Saidy, Music by Harold Arlen, Lyrics by Harburg	David Merrick
1958 (12th)	New Girl in Town; Book by George Abbott, Music & Lyrics by Bob Merrill	Robert E. Griffith and Harold Prince
1958 (12th)	Oh, Captain! Book by José Ferrer and Al Morgan, Music & Lyrics by Ray Evans and Jay Livingston	Howard Merrill and Theatre Corporation of America
1958 (12th)	West Side Story; Book by Arthur Laurents, Music by Leonard Bernstein, Lyrics by Stephen Sondheim	Robert E. Griffiths and Harold Prince
1959 (13th)
1959 (13th)	Redhead; Book by Dorothy and Herbert Fields, David Shaw, and Sidney Sheldon, Music by Albert Hague, Lyrics by D. Fields	Robert Fryer and Lawrence Carr
1959 (13th)	Flower Drum Song; Book by Joseph Fields and Oscar Hammerstein II, Music by Richard Rodgers, Lyrics by Hammerstein	Joseph Fields, Oscar Hammerstein II, and Richard Rodgers
1959 (13th)	La Plume de Ma Tante; Book by Robert Dhéry, Music by Gérard Calvi, Lyrics by Francis Blanche and Ross Parker	David Merrick and Joseph Kipness, present the Jack Hylton Production

=== 1960s ===
Year	Musical	Producer(s)
1960 (14th)
1960 (14th)	Fiorello! (TIE); Book by George Abbott and Jerome Weidman, Music by Jerry Bock, Lyrics by Sheldon Harnick	Robert E. Griffith & Harold Prince
1960 (14th)	The Sound of Music (TIE); Book by Howard Lindsay and Russel Crouse, Music by Richard Rodgers, Lyrics by Oscar Hammerstein II	Leland Hayward, Richard Halliday, Richard Rodgers, & Oscar Hammerstein II (posthumous)
1960 (14th)	Gypsy; Book by Arthur Laurents, Music by Jule Styne, Lyrics by Stephen Sondheim	David Merrick and Leland Hayward
1960 (14th)	Once Upon a Mattress; Book by Marshall Barer, Dean Fuller, and Jay Thompson, Music by Mary Rodgers, Lyrics by Barer	T. Edward Hambleton, Norris Houghton, William and Jean Eckart
1960 (14th)	Take Me Along; Book by Bob Russell and Joseph Stein, Music & Lyrics by Bob Merrill	David Merrick
1961 (15th)
1961 (15th)	Bye Bye Birdie; Book by Michael Stewart, Music by Charles Strouse, Lyrics by Lee Adams	Edward Padula in association with L. Slade Brown
1961 (15th)	Do Re Mi; Book by Garson Kanin, Music by Jule Styne, Lyrics by Betty Comden and Adolph Green	David Merrick
1961 (15th)	Irma La Douce; Book & Lyrics by Alexandre Breffort, Music by Marguerite Monnot; English Book & Lyrics by David Heneker, Julian More, and Monty Norman	David Merrick in association with Donald Albery, H. M. Tennent Ltd.
1962 (16th)
1962 (16th)	How to Succeed in Business Without Really Trying; Book by Abe Burrows, Willie Gilbert, and Jack Weinstock, Music & Lyrics by Frank Loesser	Cy Feuer & Ernest H. Martin
1962 (16th)	Carnival! Book by Helen Deutsch and Michael Stewart, Music & lyrics by Bob Merrill	David Merrick
1962 (16th)	Milk and Honey; Book by Don Appell, Music & Lyrics by Jerry Herman	Gerard Oestreicher
1962 (16th)	No Strings; Book by Samuel A. Taylor, Music & Lyrics by Richard Rodgers	Richard Rodgers in association with Samuel Taylor
1963 (17th)
1963 (17th)	A Funny Thing Happened on the Way to the Forum; Book by Larry Gelbart and Burt Shevelove, Music & Lyrics by Stephen Sondheim	Harold Prince
1963 (17th)	Little Me; Book by Neil Simon, Music by Cy Coleman, Lyrics by Carolyn Leigh	Cy Feuer & Ernest H. Martin
1963 (17th)	Oliver! Book, Music, & Lyrics by Lionel Bart	David Merrick and Donald Albery
1963 (17th)	Stop the World – I Want to Get Off; Book, Music & Lyrics by Leslie Bricusse and Anthony Newley	David Merrick in association with Bernard Delfont
1964 (18th)
1964 (18th)	Hello, Dolly! Book by Michael Stewart, Music & Lyrics by Jerry Herman	David Merrick
1964 (18th)	Funny Girl; Book by Isobel Lennart, Music by Jule Styne, Lyrics by Bob Merrill	Ray Stark
1964 (18th)	High Spirits; Book, Music & Lyrics by Timothy Gray and Hugh Martin	Lester Osterman, Robert Fletcher, and Richard Horner
1964 (18th)	She Loves Me; Book by Joe Masteroff, Music by Jerry Bock, Lyrics by Sheldon Harnick	Harold Prince in association with Lawrence Kasha and Philip C. McKenna
1965 (19th)
1965 (19th)	Fiddler on the Roof; Book by Joseph Stein, Music by Jerry Bock, Lyrics by Sheldon Harnick	Harold Prince
1965 (19th)	Golden Boy; Book by William Gibson and Clifford Odets, Music by Charles Strouse, Lyrics by Lee Adams	Hillard Elkins
1965 (19th)	Half a Sixpence; Book by Beverley Cross, Music & Lyrics by David Heneker	Allen Hodgdon, Stevens Productions, Harold Fielding
1965 (19th)	Oh, What a Lovely War! Book by Joan Littlewood and Theatre Workshop, Music & Lyrics by Various Artists	David Merrick and Gerry Raffles
1966 (20th)
1966 (20th)	Man of La Mancha; Book by Dale Wasserman, Music by Mitch Leigh, Lyrics by Joe Darion	Albert W. Seldon and Hal James
1966 (20th)	Mame; Book by Jerome Lawrence and Robert E. Lee, Music & Lyrics by Jerry Herman	Sylvia and Joseph Harris, Robert Fryer and Lawrence Carr
1966 (20th)	Skyscraper; Book by Peter Stone, Music by Jimmy Van Heusen, Lyrics by Sammy Cahn	Cy Feuer & Ernest H. Martin
1966 (20th)	Sweet Charity; Book by Neil Simon, Music by Cy Coleman, Lyrics by Dorothy Fields	Sylvia and Joseph Harris, Robert Fryer and Lawrence Carr
1967 (21st)
1967 (21st)	Cabaret; Book by Joe Masteroff, Music by John Kander, Lyrics by Fred Ebb	Harold Prince in association with Ruth Mitchell
1967 (21st)	The Apple Tree; Book by Jerry Bock and Sheldon Harnick, and Jerome Coopersmith, Music by Bock, Lyrics by Harnick	Stuart Ostrow
1967 (21st)	I Do! I Do! Book & Lyrics by Tom Jones, Music by Harvey Schmidt	David Merrick
1967 (21st)	Walking Happy; Book by Ketti Frings and Roger O. Hirson, Music by Jimmy Van Heusen, Lyrics by Sammy Cahn	Cy Feuer & Ernest H. Martin
1968 (22nd)
1968 (22nd)	Hallelujah, Baby! Book by Arthur Laurents, Music by Jule Styne, Lyrics by Betty Comden and Adolph Green	Albert Selden, Hal James, Jane C. Nusbaum and Harry Rigby
1968 (22nd)	The Happy Time; Book by N. Richard Nash, Music by John Kander, Lyrics by Fred Ebb	David Merrick
1968 (22nd)	How Now, Dow Jones; Book by Max Shulman, Music by Elmer Bernstein, Lyrics by Carolyn Leigh	David Merrick
1968 (22nd)	Illya Darling; Book by Jules Dassin, Music by Manos Hatzidakis, Lyrics by Joe Darion	Kermit Bloomgarden
1969 (23rd)
1969 (23rd)	1776; Book by Peter Stone, Music & Lyrics by Sherman Edwards	Stuart Ostrow
1969 (23rd)	Hair; Book by James Rado and Gerome Ragni, Music by Galt MacDermot, Lyrics by Rado	Michael Butler
1969 (23rd)	Promises, Promises; Book by Neil Simon, Music by Burt Bacharach, Lyrics by Hal David	David Merrick
1969 (23rd)	Zorba; Book by Joseph Stein, Music by John Kander, Lyrics by Fred Ebb	Harold Prince

=== 1970s ===
Year	Musical	Producer(s)
1970 (24th)
1970 (24th)	Applause; Book by Betty Comden and Adolph Green, Music by Charles Strouse, Lyrics by Lee Adams	Joseph Kipness and Lawrence Kasha
1970 (24th)	Coco; Book & Lyrics by Alan Jay Lerner, Music by André Previn	Frederick Brisson
1970 (24th)	Purlie; Book by Ossie Davis, Philip Rose, and Peter Udell, Music by Gary Geld, Lyrics by Udell	Philip Rose
1971 (25th)
1971 (25th)	Company; Book by George Furth, Music & Lyrics by Stephen Sondheim	Harold Prince
1971 (25th)	The Me Nobody Knows; Book by Robert H. Livingston, Herb Schapiro, and Stephen M. Joseph, Music by Gary William Friedman, Lyrics by Will Holt	Jeff Britton
1971 (25th)	The Rothschilds; Book by Sherman Yellen, Music by Jerry Bock, Lyrics by Sheldon Harnick	Lester Osterman and Hillard Elkins
1972 (26th)
1972 (26th)	Two Gentlemen of Verona; Book by John Guare and Mel Shapiro, Music by Galt Macdermot, Lyrics by Guare	New York Shakespeare Festival and Joseph Papp
1972 (26th)	Ain't Supposed to Die a Natural Death; Book, Music, & Lyrics by Melvin Van Peebles	Eugene V. Wolsk, Charles Blackwell, Emanuel Azenberg, and Robert Malina
1972 (26th)	Follies; Book by James Goldman, Music & Lyrics by Stephen Sondheim	Harold Prince
1972 (26th)	Grease; Book, Music, & Lyrics by Warren Casey and Jim Jacobs	Kenneth Waissman and Maxine Fox
1973 (27th)
1973 (27th)	A Little Night Music; Book by Hugh Wheeler, Music & Lyrics by Stephen Sondheim	Harold Prince
1973 (27th)	Don't Bother Me, I Can't Cope; Book, Music, & Lyrics by Micki Grant	Edward Padula and Arch Lustberg
1973 (27th)	Pippin; Book by Roger Hirson, Music & Lyrics by Stephen Schwartz	Stuart Ostrow
1973 (27th)	Sugar; Book by Peter Stone, Music by Jule Styne, Lyrics by Bob Merrill	David Merrick
1974 (28th)
1974 (28th)	Raisin; Book by Robert B. Nemiroff and Charlotte Zaltzberg, Music by Judd Woldin, Lyrics by Robert Brittan	Robert B. Nemiroff
1974 (28th)	Over Here! Book by Will Holt, Music & Lyrics by Richard M. and Robert B. Sherman	Kenneth Waissman and Maxine Fox
1974 (28th)	Seesaw; Book by Michael Bennett, Music by Cy Coleman, Lyrics by Dorothy Fields	Joseph Kipness, Lawrence Kasha, James M. Nederlander, George Steinbrenner and Lorin E. Price
1975 (29th)
1975 (29th)	The Wiz; Book by William F. Brown, Music & Lyrics by Charlie Smalls	Ken Harper
1975 (29th)	The Lieutenant; Book, Music & Lyrics by Gene Curty, Nitra Scharfman, and Chuck Strand	Joseph S. Kutrzeba and Spofford Beadle
1975 (29th)	Mack and Mabel; Book by Michael Stewart, Music & Lyrics by Jerry Herman	David Merrick
1975 (29th)	Shenandoah; Book by James Lee Barrett, Philip Rose, and Peter Udell, Music by Gary Geld, Lyrics by Udell	Philip Rose, Gloria and Louis K. Sher
1976 (30th)
1976 (30th)	A Chorus Line; Book by James Kirkwood, Jr. and Nicholas Dante, Music by Marvin Hamlisch, Lyrics by Edward Kleban	Joseph Papp and New York Shakespeare Festival
1976 (30th)	Bubbling Brown Sugar; Book by Loften Mitchell, Based on a concept by Rosetta LeNoire, Music & Lyrics by Various Artists	J. Lloyd Grant, Richard Bell, Robert M. Cooper, Ashton Springer in association with Moe Septee, Inc.
1976 (30th)	Chicago; Book by Fred Ebb and Bob Fosse, Music by John Kander, Lyrics by Ebb	Robert Fryer and James Cresson
1976 (30th)	Pacific Overtures; Book by John Weidman, Music & Lyrics by Stephen Sondheim	Harold Prince in association with Ruth Mitchell
1977 (31st)
1977 (31st)	Annie; Book by Thomas Meehan, Music by Charles Strouse, Lyrics by Martin Charnin	Lewis Allen, Mike Nichols, Irwin Meyer, and Stephen R. Friedman
1977 (31st)	Happy End; Book by Elisabeth Hauptmann, Music by Kurt Weill, Lyrics by Bertolt Brecht	Michael Harvey, The Chelsea Theatre Center
1977 (31st)	I Love My Wife; Book & Lyrics by Michael Stewart, Music by Cy Coleman	Terry Allen Kramer and Harry Rigby in association with Joseph Kipness
1977 (31st)	Side by Side by Sondheim; Music & Lyrics by Stephen Sondheim, Additional Music by Leonard Bernstein, Mary & Richard Rodgers, and Jule Styne	Harold Prince in association with Ruth Mitchell
1978 (32nd)
1978 (32nd)	Ain't Misbehavin'; Book by Murray Horwitz and Richard Maltby, Jr., Music by Fats Waller, Lyrics by Various Artists	Emanuel Azenberg, Dasha Epstein, The Shubert Organization, Jane Gaynor and Ron Dante
1978 (32nd)	Dancin'; Directed & Choreographed by Bob Fosse, Music & Lyrics by Various Artists	Jules Fisher, The Shubert Organization and Columbia Pictures
1978 (32nd)	On the Twentieth Century; Book & Lyrics by Betty Comden and Adolph Green, Music by Cy Coleman	The Producers Circle 2 Inc. (Robert Fryer, Mary Lea Johnson, James Cresson and Martin Richards), Joseph Harris and Ira Bernstein
1978 (32nd)	Runaways; Book, Music, & Lyrics by Elizabeth Swados	Joseph Papp
1979 (33rd)
1979 (33rd)	Sweeney Todd: The Demon Barber of Fleet Street; Book by Hugh Wheeler, Music & Lyrics by Stephen Sondheim	Richard Barr, Charles Woodward, Robert Fryer, Mary Lea Johnson and Martin Richards
1979 (33rd)	Ballroom; Book by Jerome Kass, Music by Billy Goldenberg, Lyrics by Alan & Marilyn Bergman	Michael Bennett, Bob Avian, Bernard Gersten and Susan MacNair
1979 (33rd)	The Best Little Whorehouse in Texas; Book by Larry L. King and Peter Masterson, Music & Lyrics by Carol Hall	Universal Pictures
1979 (33rd)	They're Playing Our Song; Book by Neil Simon, Music by Marvin Hamlisch, Lyrics by Carole Bayer Sager	Emanuel Azenberg

=== 1980s ===
Year	Musical	Producer(s)
1980 (34th)
1980 (34th)	Evita; Book & Lyrics by Tim Rice, Music by Andrew Lloyd Webber	Robert Stigwood
1980 (34th)	A Day in Hollywood / A Night in the Ukraine; Book & New Lyrics by Dick Vosburgh, New Music by Frank Lazarus	Alexander H. Cohen and Hildy Parks
1980 (34th)	Barnum; Book by Mark Bramble, Music by Cy Coleman, Lyrics by Michael Stewart	Judy Gordon, Cy Coleman, Lois Rosenfield and Maurice Rosenfield
1980 (34th)	Sugar Babies; Conceived by Ralph G. Allen and Harry Rigby, Music by Jimmy McHugh, Lyrics by Dorothy Fields, Al Dubin, and Various Artists	Terry Allen Kramer and Harry Rigby
1981 (35th)
1981 (35th)	42nd Street; Book by Mark Bramble and Michael Stewart, Music by Harry Warren, Lyrics by Al Dubin	David Merrick
1981 (35th)	Sophisticated Ladies; Book by Donald McKayle, Music by Duke Ellington, Lyrics by Various Artists	Roger Berlind, Manheim Fox, Sondra Gilman, Burton L. Litwin, Louise Westergaard, Belwin Mills Publishing Corporation and Norzar Productions Inc.
1981 (35th)	Tintypes; Conceived by Mary Kyte, Mel Marvin, and Gary Pearl	Richmond Crinkley, Royal Pardon Productions, Ivan Block, Larry J. Silva, Eve Skina and Joan F. Tobin
1981 (35th)	Woman of the Year; Book by Peter Stone, Music by John Kander, Lyrics by Fred Ebb	Lawrence Kasha, David S. Landay, James M. Nederlander, Warner Theater Productions, Claire Nichtern, Carole J. Shorenstein and Stewart F. Lane
1982 (36th)
1982 (36th)	Nine; Book by Arthur Kopit, Music & Lyrics by Maury Yeston	Michel Stuart, Harvey J. Klaris, Roger Berlind, James M. Nederlander, Francine LeFrak and Kenneth D. Greenblatt
1982 (36th)	Dreamgirls; Book & Lyrics by Tom Eyen, Music by Henry Krieger	Michael Bennett, Bob Avian, Geffen Records and The Shubert Organization
1982 (36th)	Joseph and the Amazing Technicolor Dreamcoat; Book & Lyrics by Tim Rice, Music by Andrew Lloyd Webber	Zev Buffman, Susan R. Rose, Melvin J. Estrin, Sidney Shlenker and Gail Berman
1982 (36th)	Pump Boys and Dinettes; Book, Music, & Lyrics by John Foley, Mark Hardwick, Debra Monk, Cass Morgan, John Schimmel, Jim Wann	Dodger Productions, Louis Busch Hager, Marilyn Strauss, Kate Studley, Warner Theater Productions Inc. and Max Weitzenhoffer
1983 (37th)
1983 (37th)	Cats; Based on Old Possum's Book of Cats by T. S. Eliot, Music by Andrew Lloyd Webber, Additional Lyrics by Trevor Nunn & Richard Stilgoe	Cameron Mackintosh, The Really Useful Company Inc., David Geffen and The Shubert Organization
1983 (37th)	Blues in the Night; Conceived by Sheldon Epps	Mitchell Maxwell, Alan J. Schuster, Fred H. Krones and M2 Entertainment Inc.
1983 (37th)	Merlin; Book by Richard Levinson and William Link, Music by Elmer Bernstein, Lyrics by Don Black	Ivan Reitman, Columbia Pictures Stage Productions Inc., Marvin A. Krauss and James M. Nederlander
1983 (37th)	My One and Only; Book by Peter Stone and Timothy S. Mayer, Music by George Gershwin, Lyrics by Ira Gershwin	Paramount Theatre Productions, Francine LeFrak and Kenneth-Mark Productions
1984 (38th)
1984 (38th)	La Cage aux Folles; Book by Harvey Fierstein, Music & Lyrics by Jerry Herman	Allan Carr, Kenneth D. Greenblatt, Marvin A. Krauss, Stewart F. Lane, James M. Nederlander, Martin Richards, Barry Brown and Fritz Holt
1984 (38th)	Baby; Book by Sybille Pearson, Music by David Shire, Lyrics by Richard Maltby, Jr.	James B. Freydberg, Ivan Bloch, Kenneth-John Productions, Suzanne J. Schwartz and Manuscript Productions
1984 (38th)	Sunday in the Park with George; Book by James Lapine, Music & Lyrics by Stephen Sondheim	The Shubert Organization and Emanuel Azenberg
1984 (38th)	The Tap Dance Kid; Book by Charles Blackwell, Music by Henry Krieger, Lyrics by Robert Lorick	Stanley White, Evelyn Barron, Harvey J. Klaris and Michel Stuart
1985 (39th)
1985 (39th)	Big River; Book by William Hauptman, Music & Lyrics by Roger Miller	Rocco Landesman & Heidi Ettinger, Rick Steiner, M. Anthony Fisher and Dodger Productions
1985 (39th)	Grind; Book by Fay Kanin, Music by Larry Grossman, Lyrics by Ellen Fitzhugh	Kenneth D. Greenblatt, John J. Pomerantz, Mary Lea Johnson, Martin Richards, James M. Nederlander, Harold Prince, Michael Frazier, Susan Madden Samson and Jonathan Farkas
1985 (39th)	Leader of the Pack; Book by Anne Beatts, Music & Lyrics by Ellie Greenwich, Additional Lyrics by Jeff Barry, Phil Spector, Shadow Morton, Jeff Kent, and Ellen Foley	Elizabeth Ireland McCann, Nelle Nugent, Francine LeFrak, Clive Davis, John Hart Associates Inc., Rodger Hess and Richard Kagan
1985 (39th)	Quilters; Book by Barbara Damashek and Molly Newman, Music & Lyrics by Damashek	The Denver Center for the Performing Arts, John F. Kennedy Center for the Performing Arts, The American National Theatre and Academy and Brockman Seawell
1986 (40th)
1986 (40th)	The Mystery of Edwin Drood; Book, Music, & Lyrics by Rupert Holmes	Joseph Papp
1986 (40th)	Big Deal; Book by Bob Fosse, Music & Lyrics by Various Artists	The Shubert Organization, Roger Berlind, Jerome Minskoff and Jonathan Farkas
1986 (40th)	Song and Dance; Book & Lyrics by Don Black, Music by Andrew Lloyd Webber, Additional Lyrics by Richard Maltby, Jr.	Cameron Mackintosh Inc., The Shubert Organization, F.W.M. Producing Group and The Really Useful Company Inc.
1986 (40th)	Tango Argentino; Conceived by Hector Orezzoli and Claudio Segovia	Mel Howard and Donald K. Donald
1987 (41st)
1987 (41st)	Les Misérables; Book & Lyrics by Alain Boublil, Music by Claude-Michel Schoenberg, English Lyrics by Herbert Kretzmer	Cameron Mackintosh
1987 (41st)	Me and My Girl; Book & Lyrics by Douglas Furber and L. Arthur Rose, Music by Noel Gay, Revised Book by Stephen Fry and Mike Ockrent	Richard Armitage, Terry Allen Kramer, James M. Nederlander and Stage Promotions Limited & Co.
1987 (41st)	Rags; Book by Joseph Stein, Music by Charles Strouse, Lyrics by Stephen Schwartz, Revised Book by David Thompson	Lee Guber, Martin Heinfling and Marvin A. Krauss
1987 (41st)	Starlight Express; Music by Andrew Lloyd Webber, Lyrics by Richard Stilgoe	Martin Starger and Lord Grade
1988 (42nd)
1988 (42nd)	The Phantom of the Opera; Book by Andrew Lloyd Webber and Richard Stilgoe, Music by Lloyd Webber, Lyrics by Charles Hart, Additional Lyrics by Stilgoe	Cameron Mackintosh and The Really Useful Theatre Company Inc.
1988 (42nd)	Into the Woods; Book by James Lapine, Music & Lyrics by Stephen Sondheim	Heidi Landesman, Rocco Landesman, Rick Steiner, M. Anthony Fisher, Frederic H. Mayerson and Jujamcyn Theaters
1988 (42nd)	Romance/Romance; Book & Lyrics by Barry Harman, Music by Keith Herrmann	Dasha Epstein, Harve Brosten and Jay S. Bulmash
1988 (42nd)	Sarafina! Book by Mbongeni Ngema, Music & Lyrics by Ngema and Hugh Masekela	Lincoln Center Theater, Gregory Mosher, Bernard Gersten, Lucille Lortel and The Shubert Organization
1989 (43rd)
1989 (43rd)	Jerome Robbins' Broadway; Directed & Choreographed by Jerome Robbins	The Shubert Organization, Roger Berlind, Suntory International Corp., Byron Goldman and Emanuel Azenberg
1989 (43rd)	Black and Blue; Directed by Hector Orezzoli and Claudio Segovia, Music & Lyrics by Various Artists	Mel Howard and Donald K. Donald
1989 (43rd)	Starmites; Book by Barry Keating and Stuart Ross, Music & Lyrics by Keating	Hinks Shimberg, Mary Keil and Steven Warnick

=== 1990s ===
Year	Musical	Producer(s)
1990 (44th)
1990 (44th)	City of Angels; Book by Larry Gelbart, Music by Cy Coleman, Lyrics by David Zippel	Nick Vanoff, Roger Berlind, Jujamcyn Theaters, Suntory International Corp. and The Shubert Organization
1990 (44th)	Aspects of Love; Book & Music by Andrew Lloyd Webber, Lyrics by Don Black and Charles Hart	The Really Useful Theater Co. Inc.
1990 (44th)	Grand Hotel: The Musical; Book by Luther Davis, Music & Lyrics by George Forrest, Robert Wright, and Maury Yeston	Martin Richards, Mary Lea Johnson, Sam Crothers, Sander Jacobs, Kenneth D. Greenblatt, Paramount Pictures, Jujamcyn Theaters, Patty Grubman and Marvin A. Krauss
1990 (44th)	Meet Me in St. Louis; Book by Hugh Wheeler, Music & Lyrics by Hugh Martin and Ralph Blane	Brickhill-Burke Productions, Christopher Seabrooke and EPI Products
1991 (45th)
1991 (45th)	The Will Rogers Follies; Book by Peter Stone, Music by Cy Coleman, Lyrics by Betty Comden and Adolph Green	Pierre Cossette, Martin Richards, Sam Crothers, James M. Nederlander, Stewart F. Lane, Max Weitzenhoffer and Japan Satellite Broadcasting Inc.
1991 (45th)	Miss Saigon; Book by Alain Boublil and Claude-Michel Schönberg, Music by Schönberg, Lyrics by Boublil and Richard Maltby Jr.	Cameron Mackintosh
1991 (45th)	Once on This Island; Book & Lyrics by Lynn Ahrens, Music by Stephen Flaherty	The Shubert Organization, Capital Cities/ABC, Suntory International, James Walsh and Playwrights Horizons
1991 (45th)	The Secret Garden; Book & Lyrics by Marsha Norman, Music by Lucy Simon	Heidi Ettinger, Rick Steiner, Frederic H. Mayerson, Elizabeth Williams, Jujamcyn Theaters, TV Asahi and Dodger Productions
1992 (46th)
1992 (46th)	Crazy for You; Book by Ken Ludwig, Music by George Gershwin, Lyrics by Ira Gershwin	Samuel Roger Horchow and Elizabeth Williams
1992 (46th)	Falsettos; Book by James Lapine and William Finn, Music & Lyrics by Finn	Barry and Fran Weissler
1992 (46th)	Five Guys Named Moe; Book by Clarke Peters, Music & Lyrics by Louis Jordan	Cameron Mackintosh
1992 (46th)	Jelly's Last Jam; Book by George C. Wolfe, Music by Luther Henderson and Jelly Roll Morton, Lyrics by Susan Birkenhead	Margo Lion, Pamela Koslow, PolyGram Diversified Entertainment, 126 Second Avenue Corp. / Hal Luftig, Roger Hess, Jujamcyn Theaters / TV Asahi and Herb Alpert
1993 (47th)
1993 (47th)	Kiss of the Spider Woman; Book by Terrence McNally, Music by John Kander, Lyrics by Fred Ebb	Live Entertainment Corp. of Canada / Garth Drabinsky
1993 (47th)	Blood Brothers; Book, Music, & Lyrics by Willy Russell	Bill Kenwright
1993 (47th)	The Goodbye Girl; Book by Neil Simon, Music by Marvin Hamlisch, Lyrics by David Zippel	Office Two-One Inc., Gladys Nederlander, Stewart F. Lane, James M. Nederlander, Richard Kagan and Emanuel Azenberg
1993 (47th)	The Who's Tommy; Book by Des McAnuff and Pete Townshend, Music & Lyrics by Townshend	Pace Theatrical Group, Dodger Productions and Kardana Productions, Inc.
1994 (48th)
1994 (48th)	Passion; Book by James Lapine, Music & Lyrics by Stephen Sondheim	The Shubert Organization, Capital Cities/ABC, Roger Berlind, Scott Rudin and Lincoln Center Theater
1994 (48th)	Beauty and the Beast; Book by Linda Woolverton, Music by Alan Menken, Lyrics by Howard Ashman and Tim Rice	Walt Disney Theatrical Productions/ Robert McTyre and Ron Logan
1994 (48th)	Cyrano: The Musical; Book by Koen van Dijk, Music by Ad van Dijk, Lyrics by Koen van Dijk, Peter Reeves, and Sheldon Harnick	Joop van den Ende in association with Peter T. Kulok
1994 (48th)	A Grand Night for Singing; Book by Walter Bobbie, Music by Richard Rodgers, Lyrics by Oscar Hammerstein II	Roundabout Theatre Company and Todd Haimes
1995 (49th)
1995 (49th)	Sunset Boulevard; Book & Lyrics by Don Black and Christopher Hampton, Music by Andrew Lloyd Webber	The Really Useful Company
1995 (49th)	Smokey Joe's Cafe; Music & Lyrics by Jerry Leiber and Mike Stoller	Richard Frankel, Thomas Viertel, Steven Baruch, Jujamcyn Theaters / Jack Viertel, Rick Steiner, Frederic H. Mayerson, Center Theatre Group / Ahmanson Theatre / Gordon Davidson
1996 (50th)
1996 (50th)	Rent; Book, Music, & Lyrics by Jonathan Larson	Jeffrey Seller, Kevin McCollum, Allan S. Gordon and New York Theatre Workshop
1996 (50th)	Bring in 'da Noise, Bring in 'da Funk; Book by Reg E. Gaines, Music by Ann Duquesnay, Zane Mark, and Daryl Waters, Lyrics by Duquesnay, Gaines, and George C. Wolfe	The Joseph Papp Public Theater / New York Shakespeare Festival, George C. Wolfe and Joey Parnes
1996 (50th)	Chronicle of a Death Foretold; Book & Lyrics by Graciela Daniele, Michael John LaChiusa, and Jim Lewis, Music by Bob Telson	Lincoln Center Theater, André Bishop, Bernard Gersten and INTAR Hispanic Arts Center
1996 (50th)	Swinging on a Star; Book by Michael Leeds, Music & Lyrics by Johnny Burke	Richard Seader, Mary Burke Kramer, Paul B. Berkowsky and Angels of the Arts
1997 (51st)
1997 (51st)	Titanic; Book by Peter Stone, Music & Lyrics by Maury Yeston	Dodger Endemol Theatricals, Richard S. Pechter and John F. Kennedy Center for the Performing Arts
1997 (51st)	Juan Darien; Book by Elliot Goldenthal and Julie Taymor, Music & Lyrics by Goldenthal	Lincoln Center Theater, André Bishop, Bernard Gersten and Music-Theatre Group
1997 (51st)	The Life; Book by Cy Coleman, Ira Gasman, and David Newman, Music by Coleman, Lyrics by Gasman	Roger Berlind, Martin Richards, Cy Coleman and Sam Crothers
1997 (51st)	Steel Pier; Book by David Thompson, Music by John Kander, Lyrics by Fred Ebb	Roger Berlind
1998 (52nd)
1998 (52nd)	The Lion King; Book by Roger Allers and Irene Mecchi, Music by Elton John, Tsidii Le Loka, Lebo M, Mark Mancina, Jay Rifkin, & Hans Zimmer, Lyrics by Le Loka, M, Mancina, Rifkin, Tim Rice, and Julie Taymor	Disney (Thomas Shumacher and Peter Schneider)
1998 (52nd)	Ragtime; Book by Terrence McNally, Music by Stephen Flaherty, Lyrics by Lynn Ahrens	Livent U.S. Inc.
1998 (52nd)	The Scarlet Pimpernel; Book & Lyrics by Nan Knighton, Music by Frank Wildhorn	Pierre Cossette, Bill Haber, Hallmark Entertainment, Ted Forstmann, Kathleen Raitt
1998 (52nd)	Side Show; Book & Lyrics by Bill Russell, Music by Henry Krieger	Emanuel Azenberg, Joseph Nederlander, Herschel Waxman, Janice McKenna and Scott Nederlander
1999 (53rd)
1999 (53rd)	Fosse; Conceived by Richard Maltby Jr., Ann Reinking, and Chet Walker	Livent U.S. Inc.
1999 (53rd)	The Civil War; Book by Gregory Boyd and Frank Wildhorn, Music by Wildhorn, Lyrics by Jack Murphy	Pierre Cossette, PACE Theatrical Group/SFX Entertainment, Bomurwil Productions, Kathleen Raitt and Jujamcyn Theaters
1999 (53rd)	It Ain't Nothin' But the Blues; Book by Charles Bevel, Lita Gaithers, Randal Myler, Ron Taylor, and Dan Wheetman, Music & Lyrics by Various Artists	Eric Krebs, Jonathan Reinis, Lawrence Horowitz, Anita Waxman, Elizabeth Williams, CTM Productions, Anne Squadron, Lincoln Center Theater, Crossroads Theatre Company, San Diego Repertory Theatre and Alabama Shakespeare Festival
1999 (53rd)	Parade; Book by Alfred Uhry, Music & Lyrics by Jason Robert Brown	Lincoln Center Theater, André Bishop, Bernard Gersten and Livent U.S. Inc.

=== 2000s ===
Year	Musical	Producer(s)
2000 (54th)
2000 (54th)	Contact; Book by John Weidman, Choreography by Susan Stroman, Music & Lyrics by Various Artists	Lincoln Center Theater, André Bishop and Bernard Gersten
2000 (54th)	James Joyce's The Dead; Book by Richard Nelson, Music by Shaun Davey, Lyrics by Davey and Nelson	Gregory Mosher, Arielle Tepper, Playwrights Horizons and Tim Sanford
2000 (54th)	Swing! Book by Paul Kelly, Choreography by Lynne Taylor-Corbett, Music & Lyrics by Various Artists	Jujamcyn Theaters, et al.
2000 (54th)	The Wild Party; Book by Michael John LaChiusa and George C. Wolfe, Music & Lyrics by LaChiusa	The Joseph Papp Public Theater / New York Shakespeare Festival, George C. Wolfe, Scott Rudin / Paramount Pictures, Roger Berlind and Williams/Waxman
2001 (55th)
2001 (55th)	The Producers; Book by Mel Brooks and Thomas Meehan, Music & Lyrics by Brooks	Rocco Landesman, SFX Theatrical Group, The Frankel-Baruch-Viertel-Routh Group, Bob and Harvey Weinstein, Rick Steiner, Robert F.X. Sillerman, Mel Brooks and James D. Stern / Douglas Meyer
2001 (55th)	A Class Act; Book by Linda Kline and Lonny Price, Music & Lyrics by Edward Kleban	Marty Bell, Chase Mishkin, Arielle Tepper and Manhattan Theatre Club
2001 (55th)	The Full Monty; Book by Terrence McNally, Music & Lyrics by David Yazbek	Fox Searchlight Pictures, Lindsay Law and Thomas Hall
2001 (55th)	Jane Eyre; Book by John Caird, Music & Lyrics by Paul Gordon	Annette Niemtzow, Janet Robinson, Pamela Koslow, Margaret McFeeley Golden, Jennifer Manocherian and Carolyn Kim McCarthy
2002 (56th)
2002 (56th)	Thoroughly Modern Millie; Book by Richard Morris and Dick Scanlan, Music by Jeanine Tesori, Lyrics by Scanlan	Michael Leavitt, Fox Theatricals, Stewart F. Lane, James L. Nederlander, Whoopi Goldberg, et al.
2002 (56th)	Mamma Mia! Book by Catherine Johnson, Music & Lyrics by Benny Anderson and Björn Ulvaeus	Judy Craymer, Richard East and Björn Ulvaeus for Littlestar and Universal
2002 (56th)	Sweet Smell of Success; Book by John Guare, Music by Marvin Hamlisch, Lyrics by Craig Carnelia	Clear Channel Entertainment, David Brown, Ernest Lehman, Marty Bell, Martin Richards, Roy Furman, Joan Cullman, Bob Boyett, East of Doheny, Bob and Harvey Weinstein
2002 (56th)	Urinetown; Book by Greg Kotis, Music by Mark Hollmann, Lyrics by Hollmann and Kotis	The Araca Group and Dodger Theatricals, TheaterDreams, Inc., Lauren Mitchell
2003 (57th)
2003 (57th)	Hairspray; Book by Thomas Meehan and Mark O'Donnell, Music by Marc Shaiman, Lyrics by Shaiman and Scott Wittman	Margo Lion, et al.
2003 (57th)	Amour; Book & Lyrics by Jeremy Sams and Didier Van Cauwelaert, Music by Michel Legrand	The Shubert Organization, Jean Doumanian Productions, Inc. and USA Ostar Theatricals
2003 (57th)	Movin' Out; Conceived by Twyla Tharp, Music & Lyrics by Billy Joel	James L. Nederlander, Hal Luftig, Scott E. Nederlander, Terry Allen Kramer, Clear Channel Entertainment and Emanuel Azenberg
2003 (57th)	A Year with Frog and Toad; Book & Lyrics by Willie Reale, Music by Robert Reale	Bob Boyett, Adrianne Lobel, Michael Gardner, Lawrence Horowitz, Roy Furman, Scott E. Nederlander and The Children's Theatre Company
2004 (58th)
2004 (58th)	Avenue Q Book by Jeff Whitty, Music & Lyrics by Robert Lopez and Jeff Marx	Kevin McCollum, Robyn Goodman, Jeffrey Seller, Vineyard Theatre and The New Group
2004 (58th)	The Boy from Oz; Book by Nick Enright and Martin Sherman, Music & Lyrics by Peter Allen	Ben Gannon and Robert Fox
2004 (58th)	Caroline, or Change; Book & Lyrics by Tony Kushner, Music by Jeanine Tesori	Carole Shorenstein Hays, HBO Films, Jujamcyn Theaters, Scott Rudin, Fox Theatricals, Roger Berlind, Clear Channel Entertainment, Joan Cullman, Greg Holland/Scott Nederlander, Margo Lion, The Public Theater, et al.
2004 (58th)	Wicked; Book by Winnie Holzman, Music & Lyrics by Stephen Schwartz	Marc Platt, Universal Pictures, The Araca Group, Jon B. Platt and David Stone
2005 (59th)
2005 (59th)	Spamalot; Book & Lyrics by Eric Idle, Music by John Du Prez and Idle	Boyett Ostar Productions, The Shubert Organization, Arielle Tepper, Jam Theatricals, TGA Entertainment, Clear Channel Entertainment, et al.
2005 (59th)	Dirty Rotten Scoundrels; Book by Jeffrey Lane, Music & Lyrics by David Yazbek	Chase Mishkin, Debra Black, Weissberger Theater Group, Clear Channel Entertainment, Harvey Weinstein, MGM on Stage, et al.
2005 (59th)	The Light in the Piazza; Book by Craig Lucas, Music & Lyrics by Adam Guettel	Lincoln Center Theater, André Bishop and Bernard Gersten
2005 (59th)	The 25th Annual Putnam County Spelling Bee; Book by Rachel Sheinkin, Music & Lyrics by William Finn	David Stone, James L. Nederlander, Barbara Whitman, Patrick Catullo, Barrington Stage Company and Second Stage Theater
2006 (60th)
2006 (60th)	Jersey Boys; Book by Marshall Brickman and Rick Elice, Music by Bob Gaudio, Lyrics by Bob Crewe	Dodger Theatricals, Joseph J. Grano, Pelican Group, Tamara and Kevin Kinsella, Latitude Link, Rick Steiner/Osher/Staton/Bell/Mayerson Group
2006 (60th)	The Color Purple; Book by Marsha Norman, Music & Lyrics by Stephen Bray, Brenda Russell, and Allee Willis	Oprah Winfrey, Quincy Jones, Kelsey Grammer, Nederlander Presentations, Bob and Harvey Weinstein, et al.
2006 (60th)	The Drowsy Chaperone; Book by Bob Martin and Don McKellar, Music & Lyrics by Lisa Lambert and Greg Morrison	Kevin McCollum, Roy Miller, Boyett Ostar Productions, Stephanie P. McClelland, Barbara Freitag, Jill Furman
2006 (60th)	The Wedding Singer; Book by Chad Beguelin and Tim Herlihy, Music by Matthew Sklar, Lyrics by Beguelin	Margo Lion, New Line Cinema, The Araca Group, Jujamcyn Theaters, et al.
2007 (61st)
2007 (61st)	Spring Awakening; Book & Lyrics by Steven Sater, Music by Duncan Sheik	Ira Pittelman, Tom Hulce, Jeffrey Richards, Jerry Frankel, Atlantic Theater Company, et al.
2007 (61st)	Curtains; Book by Rupert Holmes, Music by John Kander, Lyrics by Fred Ebb, Kander, and Holmes	Roger Berlind, Roger Horchow, Daryl Roth, Jane Bergere, Ted Hartley and Center Theatre Group
2007 (61st)	Grey Gardens; Book by Doug Wright, Music by Scott Frankel, Lyrics by Michael Korie	East of Doheny, Staunch Entertainment, Randall Wreghitt / Mort Swinsky, Michael Alden, Edwin W. Schloss and Playwrights Horizons
2007 (61st)	Mary Poppins; Book by Julian Fellowes, Music by Richard M. Sherman, Robert B. Sherman, and George Stiles, Lyrics by Anthony Drewe and The Sherman Brothers	Disney and Cameron Mackintosh
2008 (62nd)
2008 (62nd)	In the Heights; Book by Quiara Alegría Hudes, Music & Lyrics by Lin-Manuel Miranda	Kevin McCollum, Jeffrey Seller, Jill Furman, Sander Jacobs, Goodman/Grossman, Peter Fine, Everett/Skipper
2008 (62nd)	Cry-Baby; Book by Thomas Meehan and Mark O'Donnell, Music by Adam Schlesinger, Lyrics by David Javerbaum	Adam Epstein, Universal Pictures Stage Productions, The Pelican Group, et al.
2008 (62nd)	Passing Strange; Book & Lyrics by Stew, Music by Heidi Rodewald and Stew	The Shubert Organization, Elizabeth Ireland McCann LLC, Bill Kenwright, Chase Mishkin, The Public Theater and Berkeley Repertory Theatre, et al.
2008 (62nd)	Xanadu; Book by Douglas Carter Beane, Music & Lyrics by John Farrar and Jeff Lynne	Robert Ahrens, Dan Vickery, Tara Smith/B. Swibel and Sarah Murchison/Dale Smith
2009 (63rd)
2009 (63rd)	Billy Elliot the Musical; Book & Lyrics by Lee Hall, Music by Elton John	Universal Pictures Stage Productions, Working Title Films, Old Vic Productions and Weinstein Live Entertainment
2009 (63rd)	Next to Normal; Book & Lyrics by Brian Yorkey, Music by Tom Kitt	David Stone, James L. Nederlander, Barbara Whitman, Patrick Catullo, Second Stage Theater, Carole Rothman and Ellen Richard
2009 (63rd)	Rock of Ages; Book by Chris D'Arienzo, Music & Lyrics by Various Artists	Matthew Weaver, The Araca Group, et al.
2009 (63rd)	Shrek The Musical; Book & Lyrics by David Lindsay-Abaire, Music by Jeanine Tesori	DreamWorks Theatricals and Neal Street Productions

=== 2010s ===
Year	Musical	Producer(s)
2010 (64th)
2010 (64th)	Memphis; Book by Joe DiPietro, Music by David Bryan, Lyrics by Bryan and DiPietro	Junkyard Dog Productions, Richard Winkler, et al.
2010 (64th)	American Idiot; Book by Billie Joe Armstrong and Michael Mayer, Music by Green Day, Lyrics by Armstrong	Tom Hulce & Ira Pittelman, Vivek J. Tiwary, Berkeley Repertory Theatre, et al.
2010 (64th)	Fela! Book by Bill T. Jones and Jim Lewis, Music & Lyrics by Fela Kuti	Shawn "Jay-Z" Carter, Will and Jada Pinkett Smith, Sony Pictures Entertainment, et al.
2010 (64th)	Million Dollar Quartet; Book by Colin Escott and Floyd Mutrux, Music & Lyrics by Various Artists	Relevant Theatricals, John Cossette Productions, American Pop Anthology, Broadway Across America and James L. Nederlander
2011 (65th)
2011 (65th)	The Book of Mormon; Book, Music, & Lyrics by Robert Lopez, Trey Parker, and Matt Stone	Anne Garefino, Scott Rudin, Roger Berlind, Jean Doumanian, Sonia Friedman Productions, et al.
2011 (65th)	Catch Me If You Can; Book by Terrence McNally, Music by Marc Shaiman, Lyrics by Shaiman and Scott Wittman	Margo Lion, The Araca Group, Richard Winkler, Jamie deRoy, et al.
2011 (65th)	The Scottsboro Boys; Book by David Thompson, Music by John Kander, Lyrics by Fred Ebb	Barry and Fran Weissler, The Shubert Organization, Catherine Schreiber, et al.
2011 (65th)	Sister Act; Book by Bill and Cheri Steinkellner, Music by Alan Menken, Lyrics by Glenn Slater	Whoopi Goldberg and Stage Entertainment, The Shubert Organization and Disney Theatrical Productions
2012 (66th)
2012 (66th)	Once; Book by Enda Walsh, Music & Lyrics by Glen Hansard and Markéta Irglová	Barbara Broccoli, The Shubert Organization, New York Theatre Workshop, et al.
2012 (66th)	Leap of Faith; Book by Janus Cercone and Warren Leight, Music by Alan Menken, Lyrics by Glenn Slater	Michael Manheim, Center Theatre Group, Jujamcyn Theaters, et al.
2012 (66th)	Newsies; Book by Harvey Fierstein, Music by Alan Menken, Lyrics by Jack Feldman	Disney Theatrical Productions and Thomas Schumacher
2012 (66th)	Nice Work If You Can Get It; Book by Joe DiPietro, Music by George Gershwin, Lyrics by Ira Gershwin	Scott Landis, Roger Berlind, Sonia Friedman Productions, Candy Spelling, William Berlind, Emanuel Azenberg, The Shubert Organization, et al.
2013 (67th)
2013 (67th)	Kinky Boots; Book by Harvey Fierstein, Music & Lyrics by Cyndi Lauper	Daryl Roth, James L. Nederlander, Ken Davenport, Jim Kierstead, Jujamcyn Theaters, et al.
2013 (67th)	Bring It On: The Musical; Book by Jeff Whitty, Music by Tom Kitt and Lin-Manuel Miranda, Lyrics by Amanda Green and Miranda	Universal Pictures Stage Productions / Glenn Ross, et al.
2013 (67th)	A Christmas Story: The Musical; Book by Joseph Robinette, Music & Lyrics by Benj Pasek and Justin Paul	Gerald Goehring, et al.
2013 (67th)	Matilda the Musical; Book by Dennis Kelly, Music & Lyrics by Tim Minchin	Royal Shakespeare Company and The Dodgers
2014 (68th)
2014 (68th)	A Gentleman's Guide to Love and Murder; Book by Robert L. Freedman, Music by Steven Lutvak, Lyrics by Freedman and Lutvak	Joey Parnes, Jhett Tolentino, Jamie deRoy, Stewart F. Lane and Bonnie Comley, Joseph Sirola, et al.
2014 (68th)	After Midnight; Choreography & Direction by Warren Carlyle, Music & Lyrics by Various Artists	Scott Sanders Productions, Candy Spelling, James L. Nederlander, Tom Kirdahy, et al.
2014 (68th)	Aladdin; Book by Chad Beguelin, Music by Alan Menken, Lyrics by Howard Ashman, Tim Rice, and Beguelin	Disney Theatrical Productions and Thomas Schumacher
2014 (68th)	Beautiful: The Carole King Musical; Book by Douglas McGrath, Music & Lyrics by Carole King and Various Artists	Paul Blake, et al.
2015 (69th)
2015 (69th)	Fun Home; Book & Lyrics by Lisa Kron, Music by Jeanine Tesori	Fox Theatricals, Carole Shorenstein Hays, The Public Theater, Oskar Eustis, et al.
2015 (69th)	An American in Paris; Book by Craig Lucas, Music by George Gershwin, Lyrics by Ira Gershwin	Stuart Oken, Roger Berlind, et al.
2015 (69th)	Something Rotten! Book by Karey Kirkpatrick and John O'Farrell, Music & Lyrics by Karey Kirkpatrick and Wayne Kirkpatrick	Kevin McCollum, Robert Greenblatt, Jujamcyn Theaters, et al.
2015 (69th)	The Visit; Book by Terrence McNally, Music by John Kander, Lyrics by Fred Ebb	Tom Kirdahy, Ken Davenport, The Shubert Organization, Williamstown Theatre Festival, et al.
2016 (70th)
2016 (70th)	Hamilton; Book, Music, & Lyrics by Lin-Manuel Miranda	Jeffrey Seller, Sander Jacobs, Jill Furman and The Public Theater
2016 (70th)	Bright Star; Book by Steve Martin, Music by Edie Brickell and Martin, Lyrics by Brickell	Joey Parnes, Len Blavatnik, James L. Nederlander, The Shubert Organization, Jamie deRoy / Catherine Adler, et al.
2016 (70th)	School of Rock: The Musical; Book by Julian Fellowes, Music by Andrew Lloyd Webber, Lyrics by Glenn Slater	Andrew Lloyd Webber, The Really Useful Group, The Shubert Organization and The Nederlander Organization, et al.
2016 (70th)	Shuffle Along, or, the Making of the Musical Sensation of 1921 and All That Followed; Book by George C. Wolfe, Music & Lyrics by Eubie Blake and Noble Sissle	Scott Rudin, Center Theatre Group, Roger Berlind, William Berlind, The Araca Group, Sonia Friedman, Eli Bush, Len Blavatnik, et al.
2016 (70th)	Waitress; Book by Jessie Nelson, Music & Lyrics by Sara Bareilles	Barry and Fran Weissler, American Repertory Theater, et al.
2017 (71st)
2017 (71st)	Dear Evan Hansen; Book by Steven Levenson, Music & Lyrics by Benj Pasek and Justin Paul	Stacey Mindich, Roger and William Berlind, Colin Callender, Robert Greenblatt, Arielle Tepper Madover, Ambassador Theatre Group, The Shubert Organization, Second Stage Theater, et al.
2017 (71st)	Come from Away; Book, Music, & Lyrics by David Hein and Irene Sankoff	Junkyard Dog Productions, Richard Winkler, The Shubert Organization, Corey Brunish, et al.
2017 (71st)	Groundhog Day; Book by Danny Rubin, Music & Lyrics by Tim Minchin	Whistle Pig, The Araca Group, Len Blavatnik, Ken Davenport, John Gore Organization, Sonia Friedman Productions, Jujamcyn Theaters, et al.
2017 (71st)	Natasha, Pierre & The Great Comet of 1812; Book, Music, & Lyrics by Dave Malloy	Howard and Janet Kagan, Carole Shorenstein Hays, Jim Kierstead, American Repertory Theater, Ars Nova, et al.
2018 (72nd)
2018 (72nd)	The Band's Visit; Book by Itamar Moses, Music & Lyrics by David Yazbek	Orin Wolf, Atlantic Theater Company, Barbara Broccoli, Marc Platt, The Shubert Organization, FilmNation Entertainment, John Gore Organization, et al.
2018 (72nd)	Frozen; Book by Jennifer Lee, Music & Lyrics by Kristen Anderson-Lopez and Robert Lopez	Disney Theatrical Productions and Thomas Schumacher
2018 (72nd)	Mean Girls; Book by Tina Fey, Music by Jeff Richmond, Lyrics by Nell Benjamin	Lorne Michaels, Sonia Friedman, Paramount Pictures, Robert Greenblatt, John Gore Organization, James L. Nederlander, Universal Theatrical Group, et al.
2018 (72nd)	SpongeBob SquarePants: The Musical; Book by Kyle Jarrow, Music & Lyrics by Various Artists	Nickelodeon, The Araca Group, Sony Music Masterworks and Kelp on the Road
2019 (73rd)
2019 (73rd)	Hadestown; Book, Music, & Lyrics by Anaïs Mitchell	Mara Isaacs, Tom Kirdahy, Craig Balsam, Jujamcyn Theaters, National Theatre, New York Theatre Workshop, et al.
2019 (73rd)	Ain't Too Proud; Book by Dominique Morisseau, Music & Lyrics by The Temptations	Ira Pittelman & Tom Hulce, Berkeley Repertory Theatre, David Binder, John Gore Organization, Universal Music Theatrical, et al.
2019 (73rd)	Beetlejuice; Book by Scott Brown and Anthony King, Music & Lyrics by Eddie Perfect	Warner Bros. Theatre Ventures, Jeffrey Richards, James L. Nederlander, Mark S. Golub, John Gore Organization, et al.
2019 (73rd)	The Prom; Book by Chad Beguelin and Bob Martin, Music by Matthew Sklar, Lyrics by Beguelin	Bill Damaschke, Seth A. Goldstein, John Gore Organization, The Shubert Organization, et al.
2019 (73rd)	Tootsie; Book by Robert Horn, Music & Lyrics by David Yazbek	Scott Sanders, James L. Nederlander, Robert Greenblatt, Candy Spelling, Jamie deRoy / Catherine Adler John Gore Organization, et al.

=== 2020s ===
Year	Musical	Producer(s)
2020/2021 (74th)
2020/2021 (74th)	Moulin Rouge! The Musical; Book by John Logan, Music & Lyrics by Various Artists	Carmen Pavlovic, Bill Damaschke, Len Blavatnik, John Gore Organization, Eric Falkenstein, Candy Spelling, Jujamcyn Theaters, et al.
2020/2021 (74th)	Jagged Little Pill; Book by Diablo Cody, Music by Alanis Morissette, Glen Ballard, Michael Farrell and Guy Sigsworth, Lyrics by Morissette	Vivek J. Tiwary, James L. Nederlander, Len Blavatnik, Universal Music Publishing Group, Jujamcyn Theaters, et al.
2020/2021 (74th)	Tina: The Tina Turner Musical; Book by Katori Hall, Frank Ketelaar and Kees Prins, Music & Lyrics by Various Artists	Stage Entertainment, James L. Nederlander, Jamie deRoy, John Gore Organization, Catherine Adler, Candy Spelling, Universal Music Publishing Group, Tina Turner, et al.
2022 (75th)
2022 (75th)	A Strange Loop; Book, Music, & Lyrics by Michael R. Jackson	Barbara Whitman, Benj Pasek & Justin Paul, Alex Levy, Don Cheadle, Annapurna Theatre, Frank Marshall, Maximum Effort Productions Inc., Marc Platt, Debra Martin Chase, Laurie Tisch, Cody Renard Richard, John Gore Organization, James L. Nederlander, The Shubert Organization, RuPaul Charles, Alan Cumming, Ilana Glazer, Jennifer Hudson, Mindy Kaling, Billy Porter, Playwrights Horizons, et al.
2022 (75th)	Girl from the North Country; Book by Conor McPherson, Music & Lyrics by Bob Dylan	Tristan Baker and Charlie Parsons for Runaway Entertainment, Len Blavatnik, John Gore Organization, The Old Vic, Matthew Warchus, The Public Theater, Oskar Eustis, et al.
2022 (75th)	MJ; Book by Lynn Nottage, Music & Lyrics by Michael Jackson and Various Artists	Lia Vollack, Sony Pictures Entertainment, James L. Nederlander, Candy Spelling, John Gore Organization, Estate of Michael Jackson, et al.
2022 (75th)	Mr. Saturday Night; Book by Billy Crystal, Lowell Ganz and Babaloo Mandel, Music by Jason Robert Brown, Lyrics by Amanda Green	James L. Nederlander, Jamie deRoy, John Gore Organization, The Shubert Organization, Barry and Fran Weissler, et al.
2022 (75th)	Paradise Square; Book by Christina Anderson, Larry Kirwan and Craig Lucas, Music by Jason Howland, Lyrics by Mari Asare and Nathan Tysen	Garth H. Drabinsky, Len Blavatnik, The Shubert Organization, Henry R. Muñoz III, Berkeley Repertory Theatre, et al.
2022 (75th)	SIX: The Musical; Book, Music, & Lyrics by Toby Marlow and Lucy Moss	Kenny Wax, Wendy & Andy Barnes, George Stiles, Kevin McCollum, Chicago Shakespeare Theater
2023 (76th)
2023 (76th)	Kimberly Akimbo; Book & Lyrics by David Lindsay-Abaire, Music by Jeanine Tesori	David Stone, Atlantic Theater Company, James L. Nederlander, LaChanze, John Gore, et al.
2023 (76th)	& Juliet; Book by David West Read, Music & Lyrics by Max Martin and Various Artists	Max Martin & Tim Headington, Martin Dodd, Lukasz Gottwald, Shellback, Barry Weiss, John Gore Organization, et al.
2023 (76th)	New York, New York; Book by David Thompson and Sharon Washington, Music by Fred Ebb and John Kander, Lyrics by Kander and Ebb and Lin-Manuel Miranda	Sonia Friedman Productions, Tom Kirdahy, Ambassador Theatre Group, Colin Callender, Craig Balsam, Concord Theatricals, John Gore Organization, MGM on Stage, James L. Nederlander, Jamie deRoy, Henry R. Muñoz III, Ron Simons, et al.
2023 (76th)	Shucked; Book by Robert Horn, Music & Lyrics by Brandy Clark and Shane McAnally	Mike Bosner, Jason Owen, Gary Gersh, James L. Nederlander, Sony Music Entertainment, John Gore Organization, et al.
2023 (76th)	Some Like It Hot; Book by Matthew López and Amber Ruffin, Music by Marc Shaiman, Lyrics by Shaiman and Scott Wittman	The Shubert Organization, Neil Meron, MGM on Stage, Robert Greenblatt, James L. Nederlander, Kenny Leon, John Gore Organization, Ambassador Theatre Group Productions, The Araca Group, Concord Theatricals, Jujamcyn Theaters, Henry R. Muñoz III, Mariah Carey, et al.
2024 (77th)
2024 (77th)	The Outsiders; Book by Adam Rapp and Justin Levine, Music & Lyrics by Jonathan Clay, Zach Chance and Levine	The Araca Group, Angelina Jolie, The Shubert Organization, LaChanze, Sony Music Masterworks, Jamestown Revival Theater, Geffen Playhouse, James L. Nederlander, Warner Bros. Theatre Ventures, La Jolla Playhouse, et al.
2024 (77th)	Hell's Kitchen; Book by Kristoffer Diaz, Music & Lyrics by Alicia Keys and Various Artists	Roc Nation, Julie Yorn, The Jacobs Family, John Gore Organization, James L. Nederlander, Candy Spelling, Clara Wu Tsai, Universal Music Publishing, TodayTix ARGU, The Public Theater, Oskar Eustis, et al.
2024 (77th)	Illinoise; Book by Justin Peck and Jackie Sibblies Drury, Music & Lyrics by Sufjan Stevens	David Binder, Susan Rose, Jon B. Platt, John Gore Organization, James L. Nederlander, Park Avenue Armory, Chicago Shakespeare Theater, et al.
2024 (77th)	Suffs; Book, Music & Lyrics by Shaina Taub	Jill Furman, Rachel Sussman, Hillary Rodham Clinton, Malala Yousafzai, Tom D'Angora, Ruth Ann Harnisch, John Gore Organization, Nederlander Presentations, Candy Spelling, Craig Balsam, The Shubert Organization, The Public Theater, Oskar Eustis, et al.
2024 (77th)	Water for Elephants; Book by Rick Elice, Music & Lyrics by PigPen Theatre Co.	Peter Schneider, Frank Marshall, Isaac Robert Hurwitz, Seth A. Goldstein, John H. Tyson, John Gore Organization, Larry Lelli, The Shubert Organization, Nancy Gibbs, Steven Spielberg & Kate Capshaw, et al.
2025 (78th)
2025 (78th)	Maybe Happy Ending; Book and Lyrics by Will Aronson and Hue Park, Music by Will Aronson	Jeffrey Richards, Darren Criss, John Gore Organization, James L. Nederlander, The Shubert Organization, Will Aronson and Hue Park, et al.
2025 (78th)	Buena Vista Social Club; Book by Marco Ramirez, Music & Lyrics by Various Artists	Orin Wolf, John Styles, Jr, Barbara Broccoli, Atlantic Theatre Company, LaChanze, The Shubert Organization, John Gore Organization, Nederlander Presentations Inc., Marco Ramirez, et al.
2025 (78th)	Dead Outlaw; Book by Itamar Moses, Music & Lyrics by David Yazbek and Erik Della Penna	Lia Vollack Productions, Sonia Friedman Productions, John Gore Organization, James L. Nederlander, The Broadway's Investor Club, Audible, et al.
2025 (78th)	Death Becomes Her; Book by Marco Pennette, Music & Lyrics by Julia Mattison and Noel Carey	Universal Theatrical Club, James L. Nederlander, Steven Spielberg and Kate Capshaw, John Gore Organization, Jason Blum and James Wan, Debra Martin Chase, John Gore Organization & Marc Platt
2025 (78th)	Operation Mincemeat: A New Musical; Book, Music & Lyrics by David Cumming, Felix Hagan, Natasha Hodgson & Zoë Roberts	Avalon Entertainment; produced in association with SpitLip (David Cumming, Felix Hagan, Natasha Hodgson & Zoë Roberts), The Shubert Organization, John Gore Organization, Concord Theatricals, The Broadway's Investor Club, et al.
2026 (79th)
2026 (79th)	Schmigadoon! Book, Music & Lyrics by Cinco Paul	Lorne Michaels, Micah Frank, James L. Nederlander, Jeffrey Finn, John Gore Organization, Cinco Paul, Jamie deRoy/TT Partners, Broadway Video, Apple TV, Universal Theatrical Group, et al.
2026 (79th)	The Lost Boys; Book by David Hornsby and Chris Hoch, Music & Lyrics by The Rescues	James Carpinello, Marcus Chait, Patrick Wilson, James L. Nederlander, Ayesha & Stephen Curry, Lauren Shuler Donner, Neil Patrick Harris, Douglas Sills, Slash, Kiefer Sutherland, Stark Sands, John Gore Organization, Stewart F. Lane/Bonnie Comley, The Shubert Organization, Warner Bros. Theatre Ventures, et al.
2026 (79th)	Titanique; Book by Tye Blue, Marla Mindelle and Constantine Rousouli; Music & Lyrics by Various Artists	Eva Price, co-produced by Marla Mindelle, Constantine Rousouli, Tye Blue, James L. Nederlander, Joey Fatone, Matt Rogers, Bowen Yang, Deborah Cox & Melissa Haizlip, Ken Davenport, John Gore Organization, JC Chasez, et al.
2026 (79th)	Two Strangers (Carry a Cake Across New York); Book and Lyrics by Kit Buchan; Music by Jim Barne	Kevin McCollum, Tim Johanson, Glass Half Full Productions, Jamie Wilson Productions, Evan McGill, James L. Nederlander, Oki Wallace-Phoebe/Laurie Tisch & Greg Field, Kiln Theatre, et al.

== Records ==
Accumulated records as of 2026:

- The Producers has won the most Tonys, winning in 12 categories, including Best Musical.
- Hamilton is the most-nominated production in Tony history, with 16 nominations.
- The Sound of Music and Fiorello! are the only two musicals to date to have ever tied for the Best Musical award (in 1960).
- Passion, with 280 performances, is the Best Musical winner with the shortest official run. (If preview performances are included in the tally, then the shortest-run distinction belongs to A Strange Loop.)
- The Phantom of the Opera is the longest-running Best Musical winner, with 16 previews and over 13,981 performances.
- Hallelujah, Baby! is the only show thus far to have won the Tony Award for Best Musical after closing.
- Kiss Me, Kate and Titanic are the only two shows to win the Best Musical award without any Tony nominations in the acting categories. (In the case of Kiss Me, Kate, only winners were announced that year, and only in the lead performance categories.)
- Two Gentlemen of Verona (1972), Raisin (1974), 42nd Street (1981), and A Strange Loop (2022) won Best Musical and only one other Tony Award.
- What is now the Richard Rodgers Theatre has housed more Best Musical winners than any other Broadway venue: Guys and Dolls (1951), Damn Yankees (1956), Redhead (1959), How to Succeed in Business Without Really Trying (1962), 1776 (1969), Raisin (1974), Nine (1982), In the Heights (2008), and Hamilton (2016).
- The Mystery of Edwin Drood (1986) was the first winner of the Tony Award for Best Musical to be entirely written by one person (Rupert Holmes), a feat unmatched until Rent (1996, by Jonathan Larson), then recurring with Hamilton (2016, by Lin-Manuel Miranda), Hadestown (2019, by Anaïs Mitchell, the first woman), A Strange Loop (2022, by Michael R. Jackson), and Schmigadoon! (2026, by Cinco Paul).
- Fun Home (2015) was the first Best Musical winner written entirely by a team of women.
- The 74th Tony Awards (2020) marked the first ceremony when all the Best Musical nominees were jukebox musicals.

== See also ==
- Tony Award for Best Revival of a Musical
- Drama Desk Award for Outstanding Musical
- Laurence Olivier Award for Best New Musical
- List of Tony Award and Olivier Award winning musicals
- List of Tony Award-nominated productions
