= Drama Desk Award for Outstanding Revival =

American theatre award

- Awarded for: Outstanding Revival
- Location: New York City
- Country: United States
- Presented by: Drama Desk
- First award: 1976
- Final award: 1992
- Website: dramadesk.org (defunct)

The Drama Desk Award for Outstanding Revival is presented by the Drama Desk, a committee of New York City theatre critics, writers, and editors. It honors the Broadway, off-Broadway, off-off-Broadway, or legitimate not-for-profit theater revival of a production previously staged in New York City.

It was not until the 22nd Annual Drama Desk Awards in 1988 that a specific category for Outstanding Revival was created. The first recipient was The Royal Family, a play by George S. Kaufman and Edna Ferber that originally was staged in 1937. The award was not presented again until 1982. In 1993, the category was divided to give separate awards for plays and musicals.

== Winners and nominees ==
Key

and bold indicates the winner.

=== 1970s ===
Year	Work	Author(s)	Producer(s)	Ref.
**1976**
**1976**	**The Royal Family**	**George S. Kaufman and Edna Ferber**	Barry M. Brown, Burry Fredrik, Fritz Holt and Sally Sears	
**1976**	What Every Woman Knows	J. M. Barrie	Roundabout Theater Company	
**1976**	A Memory of Two Mondays / 27 Wagons Full of Cotton	Arthur Miller / Tennessee Williams	The Phoenix Theatre	
**1976**	They Knew What They Wanted	Sidney Howard	The Phoenix Theatre	
**1976**	Trelawny of the 'Wells'	Arthur Wing Pinero	The New York Shakespeare Festival	
**1976**	Very Good Eddie	Jerome Kern, Schuyler Greene, Philip Bartholomae and Guy Bolton	David Merrick, Max Brown and Byron Goldman	
**1976**	Who's Afraid of Virginia Woolf?	Edward Albee	Ken Marsolais and James Scott Productions, Inc.	
**1977** - **1979**	No award given.			

=== 1980s ===
Year	Work	Author(s)	Producer(s)	Ref.
1981	No award given.			
1982
1982	**Entertaining Mr. Sloane**	**Joe Orton**	Cherry Lane Theatre	
1982	The Chalk Garden	Enid Bagnold	Roundabout Theatre Company	
1982	Misalliance	George Bernard Shaw	Roundabout Theatre Company	
1983
1983	**On Your Toes**	**Richard Rodgers, Lorenz Hart and George Abbott**	**Alfred De Liagre, Jr., Roger L. Stevens, John Mauceri, Donald R. Seawell and André Pastoria**	
1983	The Cradle Will Rock	Marc Blitzstein	The Acting Company	
1983	All's Well That Ends Well	William Shakespeare	The Shubert Organization, Elizabeth Ireland McCann, Nelle Nugent, ABC Video Enterprises, Inc., Roger Berlind, Rhoda R. Herrick, Jujamcyn Theaters, MGM / UA Home Entertainment Group, Inc. and Mutual Benefit Productions	
1983	Present Laughter	Noël Coward	Circle in the Square	
1983	The Caine Mutiny Court-Martial	Herman Wouk	Circle in the Square and John F. Kennedy Center for the Performing Arts	
1984
1984	**Death of a Salesman**	**Arthur Miller**	**Robert Whitehead and Roger L. Stevens**	
1984	The Philanthropist	Christopher Hampton	Manhattan Theatre Club	
1984	Serenading Louie	Lanford Wilson	The Public Theater	
1984	Heartbreak House	Bernard Shaw	Circle in the Square	
1985
1985	**A Day in the Death of Joe Egg**	**Peter Nichols**	**The Shubert Organization, Emanuel Azenberg, Roger Berlind and Ivan Bloch**	
1985	On Approval	Frederick Lonsdale	American Jewish Theatre	
1985	Balm in Gilead	Lanford Wilson	Circle Repertory Company and Steppenwolf Theatre	
1985	Pacific Overtures	Stephen Sondheim and John Weidman	Elizabeth Ireland McCann and Nelle Nugent	
1985	Aren't We All?	Frederick Lonsdale	Douglas Urbanski, Karl Allison, Bryan Bantry and James M. Nederlander	
1986
1986	**The House of Blue Leaves**	**John Guare**	**Lincoln Center Theater**	
1986	Lemon Sky	Lanford Wilson	Second Stage Theatre	
1986	Long Day's Journey Into Night	Eugene O'Neill	Emanuel Azenberg, The Shubert Organization, Roger Peters, Roger Berlind and PACE Theatrical Group, Inc.	
1986	Loot	Joe Orton	Manhattan Theatre Club	
1986	The Iceman Cometh	Eugene O'Neill	Lewis Allen, James M. Nederlander, Stephen Graham and Ben Edwards	
1987
1987	**Anything Goes**	**Cole Porter, Guy Bolton, P. G. Wodehouse, Howard Lindsay, Russel Crouse, John Weidman and Timothy Crouse**	**Lincoln Center Theater**	
1987	Flora the Red Menace	John Kander, Fred Ebb, George Abbott, Robert Russell and David Thompson	Vineyard Theatre	
1987	Lost in the Stars	Maxwell Anderson and Kurt Weill	York Theatre Company	
1987	Dreamgirls	Henry Krieger and Tom Eyen	Marvin A. Krauss and Irving Siders	
1987	Cabaret	John Kander, Fred Ebb and Joe Masteroff	Barry & Fran Weissler	
1988
1988	**Our Town**	**Thornton Wilder**	**Lincoln Center Theater**	
1988	Long Day's Journey Into Night	Eugene O'Neill	Ken Marsolais, Alexander H. Cohen, The John F. Kennedy Center for the Performing Arts and Yale Repertory Theatre	
1988	Juno and the Paycock	Seán O'Casey	Circle in the Square	
1988	Sweeney Todd: The Demon Barber of Fleet Street	Stephen Sondheim and Hugh Wheeler	Circle in the Square	
1989	No award given.			

=== 1990s ===
Year	Work	Author(s)	Producer(s)	Ref.
1990
1990	**Gypsy**	**Jule Styne, Stephen Sondheim and Arthur Laurents**/	**Barry & Fran Weissler, Kathy Levin and Barry Brown**	
1990	The Sound of Music	Richard Rodgers and Oscar Hammerstein II	Lincoln Center Theater	
1990	Cat on a Hot Tin Roof	Tennessee Williams	Barry & Fran Weissler	
1990	The Merchant of Venice	William Shakespeare	Duncan C. Weldon and Jerome Minskoff	
1991
1991	**A Little Night Music**	**Stephen Sondheim and Hugh Wheeler**	**Lincoln Center Theater**	
1991	Camille	Alexandre Dumas fils	Ridiculous Theatrical Company	
1991	Hamlet	William Shakespeare	Roundabout Theatre Company	
1991	Machinal	Sophie Treadwell	New York Shakespeare Festival and The Public Theater	
1992
1992	**Guys and Dolls**	**Frank Loesser, Jo Swerling and Abe Burrows**	**Dodger Productions, Roger Berlind, Jujamcyn Theaters**	
1992	The Most Happy Fella	Frank Loesser	The Goodspeed Opera House, Center Theatre Group, Lincoln Center Theater, The Shubert Organization, Japan Satellite Broadcasting, Inc. and Stagevision	
1992	'Tis Pity She's a Whore	John Ford	The Public Theater	
1992	Falsettos	William Finn and James Lapine	Barry & Fran Weissler	

== Producers with multiple wins ==
4 wins

- Lincoln Center Theater

2 wins

- Roger Berlind

== Producers with multiple nominations ==
6 nominations

- Lincoln Center Theater

5 nominations

- Circle in the Square

4 nominations

- Roundabout Theatre Company
- The Shubert Organization
- Roger Berlind
- Barry & Fran Weissler

2 nominations

- The New York Shakespeare Festival
- Jujamcyn Theaters
- John F. Kennedy Center for the Performing Arts
- Manhattan Theatre Club
- Ken Marsolais
- Roger L. Stevens
- Elizabeth Ireland McCann
- Nelle Nugent
- Emanuel Azenberg
- James M. Nederlander

== Titles with multiple nominations ==
2 nominations

- Long Day's Journey into Night

== Authors with multiple wins ==
2 wins

- Stephen Sondheim

== Authors with multiple nominations ==
4 nominations

- Stephen Sondheim

3 nominations

- William Shakespeare
- Lanford Wilson
- Eugene O'Neill
- The Public Theater

2 nominations

- Arthur Miller
- Tennessee Williams
- Guy Bolton
- Joe Orton
- Richard Rodgers
- George Abbott
- Frederick Lonsdale
- John Weidman
- John Kander
- Fred Ebb
- Hugh Wheeler
- Frank Loesser
