= Ernest H. Martin =

American film and theatre producer (1919–1995)

Ernest Harold Martin (born Ernest Harold Markowitz; August 28, 1919 – May 7, 1995) was an American Broadway producer who wrote the book for a musical, owned a Broadway theater and produced motion pictures.

He is known for the Broadway productions of Guys and Dolls, How to Succeed in Business Without Really Trying, as well as the films A Chorus Line (1985) and Cabaret (1972; nominated for ten Oscars).

== Early life and education ==
He graduated from the University of California, Los Angeles, where he was elected president of the senior class.

== Career ==
Martin began his career at CBS Radio, where he quickly rose to the position of head of programming.

Martin, singly or with Cy Feuer, was nominated for the Tony Award for Best Musical five times with Walking Happy (1967); Skyscraper (1966), Little Me (1963); How to Succeed in Business Without Really Trying (1962), and Guys and Dolls (1951). Little Me and How to Succeed in Business Without Really Trying also garnered them nominations for the Tony Award for Best Producer of a Musical. How to Succeed in Business Without Really Trying and Guys and Dolls won the Tony Award for Best Musical, while "Business" also won the Best Producer Tony and the Pulitzer Prize.

Feuer and Martin owned Broadway's Lunt-Fontanne Theatre from 1960 to 1965. They were so successful as producers on Broadway that they were dubbed "The Golddust Twins". Martin was a master at conceptualization and initiator of many Broadway and film classics, while Feuer was a master at directing and executing on the ideas. Feuer was known to say, "Ernie was the sparkplug and I was the engineer".

Martin managed the Los Angeles Civic Light Opera from 1976 to 1980 as well as its sister Civic Light Opera in San Francisco, bringing Broadway shows to the West Coast and creating and cultivating new shows (such as Liza Minnelli's The Act) prior to taking them to Broadway.

== Personal life ==
He was married three times, twice to women named Nancy, and his third wife was Twyla Martin. One of his wives was the actress Nancy Guild (1925–1999), to whom he was married from 1951 to 1975; they had three children: Cecilia and Polly (deceased 2004), as well as Liz (who was Nancy Guild's daughter from a prior marriage).

== Broadway productions ==
- The Act [Original, Musical] Oct 29, 1977 – Jul 1, 1978; produced by Feuer & Martin
- The Goodbye People [Original, Play] Dec 3, 1968 – Dec 7, 1968; produced by Ernest H. Martin
- Walking Happy [Original, Musical] Nov 26, 1966 – Apr 16, 1967; produced by Ernest H. Martin
- Skyscraper [Original, Musical, Comedy] Nov 13, 1965 – Jun 11, 1966; produced by Feuer & Martin
- Little Me [Original, Musical, Comedy] Nov 17, 1962 – Jun 29, 1963; produced by Feuer & Martin
- How to Succeed in Business Without Really Trying [Original, Musical, Comedy] Oct 14, 1961 – Mar 6, 1965; produced by Feuer & Martin
- Whoop-Up [Original, Musical, Comedy] Dec 22, 1958 – Feb 7, 1959; produced by Ernest H. Martin; Book by Ernest H. Martin
- Silk Stockings [Original, Musical, Comedy] Feb 24, 1955 – Apr 14, 1956; produced by Feuer & Martin
- The Boy Friend [Original, Musical, Comedy] Sep 30, 1954 – Nov 26, 1955; produced by Feuer & Martin
- Can-Can [Original, Musical, Comedy] May 7, 1953 – Jun 25, 1955; produced by Feuer & Martin
- Where's Charley? [Original, Musical, Comedy] Jan 29, 1951 – Mar 10, 1951; produced by Feuer, Martin & Rickard
- Guys and Dolls [Original, Musical, Comedy] Nov 24, 1950 – Nov 28, 1953; produced by Feuer & Martin
- Where's Charley? [Original, Musical, Comedy] Oct 11, 1948 – Sep 9, 1950; Produced by Ernest H. Martin
