= Ruth Mitchell (disambiguation) =

Ruth Mitchell was an American reporter who fought with the Chetnik guerrillas in World War II.

Ruth Mitchell may also refer to:

- Ruth Alex Mitchell (British journalist) (1947–2010), British journalist
- Ruth Comfort Mitchell Young (1882–1954), American author and playwright who wrote as Ruth Comfort Mitchell
- Ruth Crawford Mitchell (1890–1984), founding director of the University of Pittsburgh's Nationality Rooms
- Ruth Mitchell (stage manager) (1919–2000), American stage manager
