= Isaac Robert Hurwitz =

American theatre producer

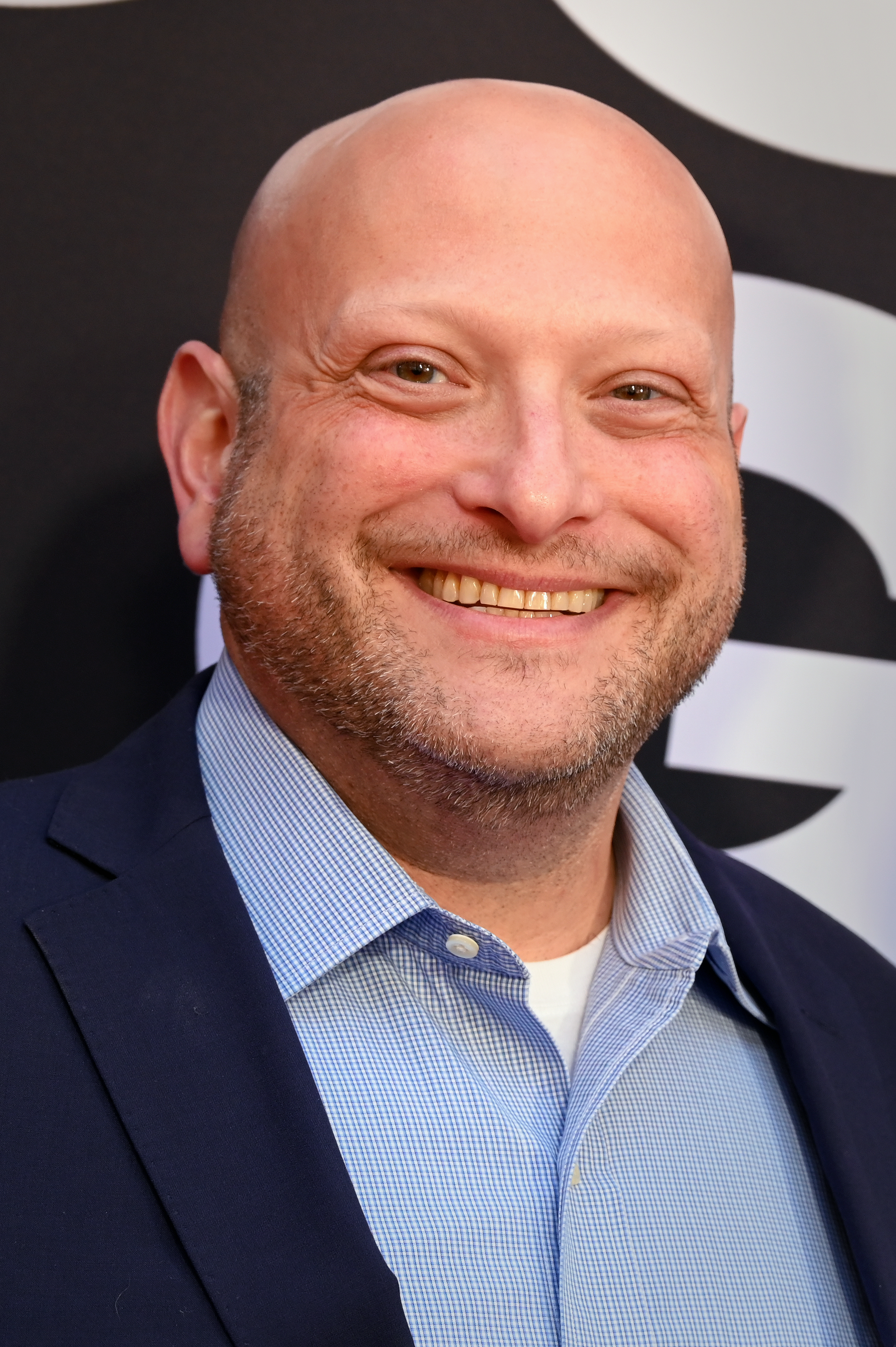
- Hurwitz in 2025
- Education: Brown University
- Occupation: Theatre Producer
- Years active: 2000-Present
- Known for: Co-founding the New York Musical Theater Festival
- Awards: Drama Desk Award

Isaac Robert Hurwitz is an American theatre producer. A graduate of Brown University., he is the co-founder of the New York Musical Theater Festival (NYMF).

He co-founded Hugo Six in 2021 and has lead produced the Tony Award-nominated Broadway productions of Water for Elephants, Gutenberg! The Musical!, and Once Upon a Mattress. He also produces Mrs. Doubtfire and The Devil Wears Prada in London and on tour, as well as Maybe Happy Ending on Broadway. From 2013 to 2019, he served as Senior Vice President of Twentieth Century Fox’s live stage division, developing theatrical adaptations of the studio’s films. During his tenure, he collaborated with artists such as Elton John, Cyndi Lauper, and Lynn Nottage, and worked on Broadway productions including Moulin Rouge and Anastasia.

Hurwitz co-founded the New York Musical Theatre Festival (NYMF), where he premiered over 350 new musicals, including the Pulitzer Prize-winning Next to Normal. He received a special Drama Desk Award for his leadership, and NYMF was awarded the Jujamcyn Theaters Prize in 2005. He has also developed work for major nonprofit theaters and served on the advisory board of City Center’s Encores! series. A frequent guest educator, he has taught at NYU, Columbia University's Theatre Management and Producing program, and Brown University, and is an alumnus of Brown University, the Lincoln Center Directors’ Lab, and the Commercial Theatre Institute.

== New York Musical Theater Festival (NYMF) ==
Hurwitz co-founded the New York Musical Theater Festival with partner, Kris Stewart, in 2004. He served as NYMF’s Executive Producer until 2009, and then as Executive Director and Producer from 2009-2013. Under his leadership, NYMF premiered "more than 350 new musicals, more than 90 of which went on to Broadway, Off-Broadway, regional, and international productions". Some of the most notable shows to be premiered at NYMF include Tony Award and Pulitzer Prize winner Next to Normal, [title of show], Altar Boyz, and Emojiland. Between 2009 and 2013, Hurwitz produced the Korean premieres of three musicals from NYMF at the Daegu International Musicals Festival. In 2005, Hurwitz and NYMF received the $100,000 Jujamcyn Theaters Prize, given to a not-for-profit theater for contributions to the art form.

In 2013, Hurwitz received a special Drama Desk Award in recognition of his service and "a decade of creating and nurturing new musical theater, ensuring the future of this essential art form." At the end of that year, Hurwitz left the festival to become a consultant for Fox Stage Productions, a new stage division of 20th Century Fox.

== Fox Stage Productions ==
After consulting with Fox Stage Productions since its creation in 2013, Hurwitz was hired as its senior vice president in July 2015. Reporting to Bob Cohen, the then head of the division, Hurwitz was tasked with developing and producing plays and musicals based on Fox’s film catalog, which included Mrs. Doubtfire, The Devil Wears Prada, and Diary of a Wimpy Kid.

Fox Stage Productions was taken over by Disney Theatrical Productions in July 2019. The takeover came as a result of Walt Disney Company's completed acquisition of the assets of 21st Century Fox. Hurwitz, Cohen, and Connor Brockmeier were among the employees that would not continue with the brand after Disney's acquisition. Hurwitz continues to develop and produce theatre for the Broadway stage.

Projects developed and produced by Fox Stage Productions during Hurwitz’s tenure included The Secret Life of Bees by Lynn Nottage, Duncan Sheik, and Susan Birkenhead, based on Sue Monk Kidd’s best-selling book, which ran off-Broadway at Atlantic Theatre Company in 2019; All About Eve, directed and adapted by Ivo van Hove, starring Gillian Anderson and Lily James, which ran at the Noel Coward Theatre in London’s West End in 2019; Diary of a Wimpy Kid by Alan Schmuckler, Michael Mahler, and Kevin Del Aguila, which ran at the Children’s Theatre Company in Minneapolis in 2016; as well as licensed Broadway musical adaptations of Anastasia and Moulin Rouge! The Musical.

== Earlier career ==
From 2000-2003, Hurwitz served as music associate under Rob Fisher at City Center’s Encores! Series. In 2001, he directed What the Eunuch Saw by Emily Jane O'Dell starring his Brown University classmate, John Krasinski. Before joining Fox Stage Productions, Hurwitz produced The Fabulous Life of a Size Zero, which starred Gillian Jacobs, Anna Chlumsky, Kate Reinders, and Brian J. Smith; and Anthony Rapp's one-man musical, Without You, at the Menier Chocolate Factory in London and the Panasonic Theater in Toronto
