= Jill Furman =

American theatrical producer (born 1969)

Jill Furman (born 1969) is an American theatrical producer. Furman's Broadway credits include: Hamilton, (Tony Award® for Best Musical, 2016), In the Heights (Tony Award® for Best Musical, 2008), Rodgers + Hammerstein’s Cinderella, The Heiress, Seminar, West Side Story, The Drowsy Chaperone, Sly Fox and Fortune’s Fool. Off Broadway: Freestyle Love Supreme, On The Line and Adult Entertainment. Furman's father is the producer Roy Furman.

== Career ==
Furman co-produced the Broadway plays Sly Fox (2004) and Fortune's Fool (2002). She also produced off-Broadway's On the Line, running in April 2006. Also in 2006, Furman brought The Drowsy Chaperone to Broadway at the Marquis Theatre. The show won multiple Tony Awards, and was nominated for Best Musical. It closed on December 30, 2007, after 674 performances and 32 previews.

Furman also produced the off-Broadway run of the hit musical In the Heights. The musical transferred to Broadway with previews starting on February 14, 2008, with an official opening on March 9 at the Richard Rodgers Theatre. The production played its final performance on January 9, 2011. For this, Furman and producers Jeffrey Seller and Kevin McCollum won a Tony Award. In 2009, she executive produced a Broadway revival of West Side Story.

Furman produced Hamilton: An American Musical is a sung-and-rapped through musical about the life of American Founding Father Alexander Hamilton, with music, lyrics and book by Lin-Manuel Miranda, inspired by the 2004 biography Alexander Hamilton by historian Ron Chernow. This musical opened on Broadway in 2015 and won the Tony Award for Best Musical in 2016. Furman is also credited with producing In the Heights (2021) and We Are Freestyle Love Supreme (2020).

== Awards and accolades ==
Producing

- 2006 Tony Award for Best Musical - The Drowsy Chaperone - Nominee
- 2006 Drama Desk Award for Outstanding Musical - The Drowsy Chaperone - WINNER
- 2007 Drama Desk Award for Outstanding Musical - In the Heights - Nominee
- 2008 Tony Award for Best Musical - In the Heights - WINNER
- 2009 Tony Award for Best Revival of a Musical - West Side Story - Nominee
- 2016 Tony Award for Best Musical - Hamilton - WINNER

Other accolades

- 2011 Robert Whitehead Award, from the Commercial Theater Institute
