= Emanuel Azenberg =

American theatre producer and manager

Emanuel "Manny" Azenberg (born January 22, 1934) is an American theatre producer and general manager whose professional relationship with playwright Neil Simon spans thirty-three years.

== Life and career ==
Azenberg was born in The Bronx, the son of Jewish parents Hannah (née Kleiman) and Charles Joshua Azenberg. He attended the Bronx High School of Science. He became interested in the theatre after seeing his uncle, former Yiddish theatre actor Wolfe Barzell, perform in the 1948 play Skipper Next to God by Jan de Hartog. After studying at New York University and serving time in the United States Army, he became the assistant company manager for The Legend of Lizzie, an ill-fated 1959 play that closed after two performances. He worked for David Merrick and Alexander H. Cohen before earning his first producing credit with The Lion in Winter in 1966.

Azenberg first met Neil Simon in 1963 when the two played softball with Robert Redford, who was appearing in Simon's play Barefoot in the Park at the time. Their professional association began with The Sunshine Boys in 1972 and continued with The Good Doctor, God's Favorite, Chapter Two, They're Playing Our Song, I Ought to Be in Pictures, Brighton Beach Memoirs, Biloxi Blues, Broadway Bound, Lost in Yonkers, Jake's Women, The Goodbye Girl, and Laughter on the 23rd Floor, among others.

Additional Azenberg credits include Mark Twain Tonight!, George M!, The Rothschilds, Two Gentlemen of Verona, Ain't Supposed to Die a Natural Death, Sticks and Bones, That Championship Season, The Wiz, Ain't Misbehavin', Whose Life is it Anyway?, "Master Harold"...and the Boys, The Real Thing, Sunday in the Park with George, A Day in the Death of Joe Egg, Jerome Robbins' Broadway, The Iceman Cometh, Rent, Movin' Out, Stones in His Pockets, and Baz Luhrmann's adaptation of La Bohème.

In an interview with The New York Times, Azenberg observed, "I am not a deep thinker. I am not a writer, though I recognize good ideas when I see them. I am there to service people. A producer creates an atmosphere — or tries to — that is genuinely comfortable, so the best creative work can take place. You try to keep peace, because there are so many disparate groups within the theatre."

Azenberg also has taught theatre at Duke University for two decades. He was elected to the American Theatre Hall of Fame in 2009. He is married to Lani Sundsten, a one-time dancer and the original stage manager for Cats, and he is the father of five children: Karen, Lisa, Rebecca, Jessica, and Joshua.

== Awards ==
- 1978 Drama Desk Award for Outstanding Musical (Ain't Misbehavin')
- 1978 Tony Award for Best Musical (Ain't Misbehavin')
- 1980 Drama Desk Award for Outstanding New Play (Children of a Lesser God)
- 1980 Tony Award for Best Play (Children of a Lesser God)
- 1982 Drama Desk Award for Outstanding New Play ("Master Harold"...and the Boys)
- 1982 Tony Award for Best Play ("Master Harold"...and the Boys)
- 1984 Drama Desk Award for Outstanding Musical (Sunday in the Park with George)
- 1984 Drama Desk Award for Outstanding New Play (The Real Thing)
- 1984 Tony Award for Best Play (The Real Thing)
- 1985 Drama Desk Award for Outstanding Revival (A Day in the Death of Joe Egg)
- 1985 Tony Award for Best Revival (A Day in the Death of Joe Egg)
- 1985 Tony Award for Best Play (Biloxi Blues)
- 1989 Drama Desk Award for Outstanding Musical (Jerome Robbins' Broadway)
- 1989 Tony Award for Best Musical (Jerome Robbins' Broadway)
- 1991 Drama Desk Award for Outstanding New Play (Lost in Yonkers)
- 1991 Tony Award for Best New Play (Lost in Yonkers)
- 1999 Drama Desk Award for Outstanding Revival of a Play (The Iceman Cometh)
- 1999 Tony Award for Best Revival of a Play (The Iceman Cometh)
- 2002 Drama Desk Award for Outstanding Revival of a Play (Private Lives)
- 2002 Tony Award for Best Revival of a Play (Private Lives)
- 2012 Special Tony Award, Lifetime Achievement in the Theatre
