= Fritz Holt =

American theatre producer and director (1940–1987)

Fritz Holt (October 9, 1940 – July 14, 1987) was an American theatre producer and director.

Born George William Holt III in San Francisco, Holt was a graduate of the University of Oregon. He began his career as an assistant stage manager at the Mineola Playhouse in Mineola, New York, where he worked until Harold Prince hired him to assistant stage manage the national tour of Cabaret. Holt and Prince later would collaborate on Company and Follies.

Holt's first Broadway credit as a stage manager was the 1969 production of the Arthur Kopit play Indians. His first producing credit was the short-lived 1974 revival of Gypsy starring Angela Lansbury. He helped coordinate Bette Midler's Clams on the Half Shell Revue, but aside from this and a revival of The Royal Family (which won him the Drama Desk Award for Outstanding Revival), he was plagued by a series of flops, including Summer Brave, Platinum, a revival of The Goodbye People, Phyllis Newman's one-woman show The Madwoman of Central Park West, and the Frank Loesser-inspired revue Perfectly Frank (which he directed), until scoring a major hit with La Cage aux Folles in 1983. The production won him the Tony Award for Best Musical.

== Activism ==
In 1983, Holt was a main contributor alongside Reverend Mead Miner Bailey to the New York-based AIDS Resource Center for helping youth suffering from HIV/AIDS. The charity renamed Bailey House opened a major residence on Christopher Street to house endangered GLBT youth and families. The residence was renamed Bailey-Holt House in recognition of the two benefactors Reverend Bailey and producer Fritz Holt.

In addition to his Broadway projects, Holt staged the AIDS benefit Best of the Best at the Metropolitan Opera House in 1985.

Holt produced an Actors' Fund benefit commemorating the 100th birthday of George Abbott a month prior to his death from complications from pneumonia as a result of AIDS in Montclair, New Jersey at the age of 46.
