= Bailey House (charity) =

U.S. non-profit organization

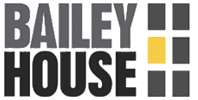
- Logo of Bailey House
- Founded: 1983; 43 years ago
- Location: New York City, New York
- Services: Housing for LGBT with HIV/AIDS
- Key people: Nicolas Noguier, Frédéric Gal
- Website: www.baileyhouse.org

Bailey House is an American charity based in New York that provides supportive housing for people living with HIV and AIDS and advocates on their behalf. In addition, the program connects individuals with medical care and other health and social services. Special housing units are set aside for LGBT homeless youths, with a number of units specifically for supporting transgender youth.

Bailey House was established in 1983 with just a few apartments in Chelsea and Greenwich Village. It was initially called the AIDS Resource Center. In 1986, Bailey-Holt House was opened as the first American congregate residence for people living with AIDS. In 1995, the name AIDS Resource Center was officially changed to Bailey House in honor of one of its founders, Reverend Mead Miner Bailey. At the same time, a major residence on Christopher Street was renamed Bailey-Holt House in recognition of Reverend Bailey and Broadway theatre producer and director Fritz Holt. In 1997, a second headquarters was opened at East Harlem Service Center, to serve the needs of critically under-served communities including East Harlem, Harlem, and the South Bronx adding bilingual, drop-in services to people living with HIV/AIDS throughout New York City, job training, a food pantry, housing placement and substance abuse services.

Bailey House provides housing and support services to LGBT homeless men, women and children living with HIV/AIDS and other chronic illnesses. Its STARS program (standing for Success Through Accessing Rental Assistance) is a permanent supportive housing program for homeless or unstably housed HIV-positive young adults between the ages of 18 and 24. A specific program called Project FIRST was also launched, comprising housing aid for HIV-infected men and women leaving prison. Schafer Hall, a 91-unit supportive housing residence opened in East Harlem in 2001.

The charity has important media presence and visibility and is supported particularly by many in the artistic community who organize many charity concerts to contribute in financing the charity.
