= Judy Gordon (producer) =

American theater producer

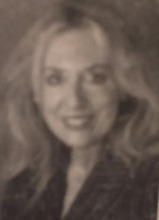
- Occupation: Theatre producer
- Known for: Producing Broadway and Off-Broadway shows

Judy Gordon is an American theater producer of plays and musicals on Broadway and off-Broadway as well as internationally. Her productions include the musical Barnum with music by Cy Coleman, starring Jim Dale and Glenn Close on Broadway and Michael Crawford in London. She also produced A History of the American Film by Christopher Durang on Broadway, and 2x5 by John Kander and Fred Ebb off Broadway.

== Career ==
Judy Gordon started her producing career as assistant to the playwright Peter Stone on a political show “A Lyrical Evening for Howard Samuels” at the Palace Theater. Her first commercial production was “2 by 5”, a compilation of John Kander & Fred Ebb songs at the Village Gate Off-Broadway in 1976. That show introduced the song “New York, New York” before the release of the movie of the same name in 1977. Her first Broadway production was “A History of the American Film” by Christopher Durang in 1978. It received one Tony nomination for best book for a musical and won a Drama Desk award for Outstanding Featured Actress in a Musical (Swoosie Kurtz). In 1980, Gordon produced the musical Barnum on Broadway starring Jim Dale and Glenn Close with music by Cy Coleman, lyrics by Michael Stewart and book by Mark Bramble. It received ten Tony nominations and won three Tony Awards; for Best Actor in a Musical (Jim Dale), Best Set (David Mitchell), and Best Costumes (Theoni Aldredge). The London production opened in 1981 and starred Michael Crawford who won the Olivier Award for Best Actor in a Musical.

In 1982, Gordon optioned a book by Bruce Jay Friedman named “The Lonely Guy's Book of Life” to develop for the stage. However, upon learning that Steve Martin was interested in doing it as a film, she made a deal with Universal Studios and became a producer of the film The Lonely Guy starring Steve Martin which was released in 1984. During the 1980s and 1990s, Gordon lived in both New York and London. In 1988, she produced “Brel” at the Donmar Warehouse in London directed by Bill Bryden, designed by Robert Crowley and starring Sian Phillips. In 1990, she produced The High Rollers Social and Pleasure Club on Broadway which featured Allen Toussaint and his music. It was nominated for a Tony award for Best Featured Actress (Vivian Reed). Gordon also produced “Villa Diodati” at the New York Musical Theatre Festival, The Fastest Clock in the Universe by Philip Ridley with the New Group, New York Stories Off Broadway, and “George White Scandals” for the 25th Anniversary of the Eugene O’Neill Theater Center.

She is currently developing a new musical.
