= Chase Mishkin =

American theater producer (died 2022)

Chase Mishkin (January 22, 1937 – July 24, 2022), born Mary Margaret Hahn, was an American theater producer. She was the winner of two Tony Awards, one for Dame Edna: The Royal Tour and the other for Memphis.

She was married to Ralph Mishkin from 1970 until his death in 1993, after which she produced her first play: Trish Vradenburg’s The Apple Doesn’t Fall… It opened in Los Angeles and moved to Broadway in 1996. In total she produced 30 Broadway shows over two decades, and as of 2009 had produced another 10 Off-Broadway.
