= Robert E. Griffith =

Robert E. Griffith (1907 – June 7, 1961) was an American theatre producer, stage manager, and performer who was best known for his work with Harold Prince and George Abbott on the Broadway stage.

== Life and career ==
Griffith was born in 1907 in the town of Methuen, Massachusetts. In 1929, he made his way to Broadway and began to work as a performer. He was first seen in the play Under the Gaslight by Augustin Daly at the Bowery Theatre. Griffith worked steadily throughout the 1930s as a performer and stage manager in a string of Broadway plays such as; The Decoy, Dinner at Eight, and Merrily We Roll Along. In the 1940s and 50s Griffith moved away from performing and focused on stage managing Broadway musicals namely; Best Foot Forward, Where's Charley?, and A Tree Grows in Brooklyn.

It was during his time as a stage manager that he came into contact with George Abbott. Abbott soon took him under his wing. Griffith decided he wished to begin producing for the theatre and recruited a young Harold Prince to devise a new musical based on a popular novel of the time 7½ Cents. After acquiring the rights to the book, Griffith hired his mentor George Abbott. The producing duo soon hired the new writing team of Richard Adler and Jerry Ross to write the show. Abbott would direct along with famous television choreographer Bob Fosse. Their first production credit, The Pajama Game, became a runaway hit and won the Tony Award for Best Musical.

The duo followed up their successes of The Pajama Game with another musical based on a hit novel, Damn Yankees. They brought back almost the entire production team of The Pajama Game and earned their second Tony Award for Best Musical. Their third musical together, New Girl in Town, was a modest hit but they were looking for more meaningful subject matter. When the opportunity came to work with Leonard Bernstein, Jerome Robbins, and Stephen Sondheim on a new musical based on the Shakespearean play Romeo and Juliet they jumped at the opportunity. The show that was created, West Side Story, wasn't a hit at first but has now become a classic of American musical theatre. Griffith and Prince's last producing venture together, Fiorello!, not only tied with The Sound of Music to win the Tony Award for Best Musical, but also won the Pulitzer Prize for Drama.

Griffith's work with Prince was cut short when he died on June 7, 1961.
