= Lawrence Kasha =

American dramatist

Lawrence Kasha (December 3, 1933 – September 29, 1990) was an American theatre producer and director, playwright, and stage manager.

Born in Brooklyn, New York, Kasha began his Broadway career as a production assistant for Silk Stockings in 1955. He joined the show's national tour as stage manager, then returned to New York City to work in that capacity for Li'l Abner (1956), Whoop-Up (1958), Happy Town (1959), and How to Succeed in Business Without Really Trying (1961).

Kasha had directed a season of summer stock productions at the Colonie Summer Theatre in Latham, New York in 1959, but his first major directing assignment came in 1962 with Guys and Dolls and The Most Happy Fella at the O'Keefe Center in Toronto, Ontario, Canada. He returned to Broadway to share a producing credit with Hal Prince for She Loves Me in 1963, then the following year directed Bajour and worked as associate director on Funny Girl, which he directed in the West End when Barbra Streisand took the show to London in 1966, the same year he helmed Show Boat at the New York State Theater in Lincoln Center. Three years later he returned to London to direct Ginger Rogers in Mame.

In 1978, Kasha adapted the 1954 MGM movie musical Seven Brides for Seven Brothers for the stage. Although the national tour, which he also produced and directed, was a critical and commercial success, the 1982 Broadway staging proved to be a flop, closing after fifteen previews and five performances.

Kasha's playwriting credits include The Pirate (1968), Where Have You Been, Billy Boy (1969), and Heaven Sent (1978).

Kasha served as producer for the television series Busting Loose, Komedy Tonite, and Knots Landing. He died at Cedars-Sinai Medical Center in Los Angeles, California from AIDS in 1990.

== Additional Broadway credits ==
- Hadrian VII (1969), producer
- Applause (1970), producer
- Lovely Ladies, Kind Gentlemen (1970), director
- Father's Day (1971), producer
- Inner City (1971), producer
- Seesaw (1973), producer
- No Hard Feelings (1973), producer
- Woman of the Year (1981), producer

== Additional national tours ==
- Li'l Abner (1956), director
- Gentlemen Prefer Blondes (1961) director
- Camelot (1964), director
- Cactus Flower (1968), director
- The Star-Spangled Girl (1968), director

== Awards and nominations ==
- 1981 Tony Award for Best Musical (Woman of the Year, nominee)
- 1974 Tony Award for Best Musical (Seesaw, nominee)
- 1970 Tony Award for Best Musical (Applause, winner)
- 1969 Tony Award for Best Play (Hadrian VII, nominee)
- 1964 Tony Award for Best Musical (She Loves Me, nominee)
