= William Berlind =

American theatre producer

- Born: April 12, 1973 (age 53); New York City, NY
- Education: Trinity School (New York City); Princeton University
- Occupation: Theatre Producer
- Known for: Broadway producer
- Spouse: Karen Berlind (m. 2010)
- Children: 2
- Parent(s): Roger Berlind, Helen Polk Clark

William Polk Berlind (born April 12, 1973) is an American theatre producer who currently heads Berlind Productions.

== Early life ==
Berlind was born in New York City to Roger Berlind and Helen Polk Clark. He attended Trinity School and Princeton University, where he was a member of Terrace Club and served as music director of the Gospel Ensemble Choir. He graduated in 1995 with a degree in comparative literature.

After graduating, Berlind worked as a fact-checker at Time magazine until in 2001 he transferred to The New York Observer as a staff writer and music critic. He has also written for The New York Times as an arts critic.

== Work on Broadway ==
Berlind has been involved as a producer on shows such as Nice Work If You Can Get It (2012), Grace (2012), Lucky Guy (2013), All the Way (2014), The Realistic Joneses (2014), This Is Our Youth (2014), A Delicate Balance (2014), Fish in the Dark (2015), Skylight (2015), A View From the Bridge (2015), Blackbird (2016), The Crucible (2016), Shuffle Along (2016), Dear Evan Hansen (2016), Hello, Dolly! (2017), Mean Girls (2018), and Oklahoma! (2019).

== Awards ==
Berlind is the recipient of numerous Tony Awards, including "Best Revival of a Musical" for Oklahoma! and Hello, Dolly!; "Best Revival of a Play" for The Crucible, Blackbird, and This Is Our Youth; and "Best Play" for All The Way and A View From the Bridge.

== Personal life ==
Berlind married Karen O'Neill in 2010. They have two daughters, Natasha and Gray, and live in Manhattan's Greenwich Village.
