= The Goodbye People =

Play written by Herb Gardner

1968 Playbill

The Goodbye People is a play by Herb Gardner. The play had a brief run on Broadway in 1968 and was made into a film which was released in 1986.

== Plot ==
The dramedy focuses on elderly Max Silverman, who is determined to reopen the Coney Island Boardwalk hot dog stand he closed twenty-two years earlier for renovation, despite the fact he's recovering from a severe heart attack and it's the middle of February. He demands assistance from his daughter Nancy, who abandoned her husband, changed her name from Shirley, and had a nose job in an effort to assume a new and more exciting identity but has come to realize it takes more than a $4,000 rhinoplasty to erase the past. Into their lives arrives neurotic Arthur Korman, who comes to the beach to watch the sunrise and forget he despises his career choice and inability to quit a job he hates. With the help of each other, the trio manages to jump start their individual dreams before tragedy intercedes.

== Productions ==
The play was first produced at the Berkshire Theatre in Stockbridge, Massachusetts. It was directed by Elaine May and starred Gene Saks, Zohra Lampert and Gabriel Dell. As May relates: "...it is not a special play about New York Jews. It is a quintessential play about America, about discounting the odds, about having hope with no evidence..."

The play premiered on Broadway at the Ethel Barrymore Theatre on December 3, 1968, and closed on December 7, 1968, after seven performances and 16 previews. Directed by Gardner, the cast included Milton Berle as Max Silverman, Brenda Vaccaro as Nancy Scott, Bob Dishy as Arthur Korman and Tony Lo Bianco as Max's attorney son Michael. Vaccaro was nominated for the 1969 Tony Award for Best Actress in a Play.

The play was revived on Broadway, produced by Fritz Holt and directed by Jeff Bleckner. It opened at the Belasco Theatre on April 30, 1979, and closed on the same date, after one performance and sixteen previews. The cast included Herschel Bernardi as Max, Melanie Mayron as Nancy, Ron Rifkin as Arthur and Michael Tucker as Michael.

The play was presented at the Solari Theatre, Los Angeles, California, starting on January 2, 1979. Directed by Jeff Bleckner, the cast starred Peter Bonerz (Arthur), Herschel Bernardi (Max) and Patty Duke Astin (Nancy).

== Film ==
Gardner adapted his play for a feature film he also directed. The cast included Martin Balsam as Max, Pamela Reed as Nancy, and Judd Hirsch as Arthur, with Tucker reprising his stage role as Michael The film was finished in 1984, but because of a change in the distribution company, the film was not released until 1986. The Goodbye People has parallels to Gardner's life. "He grew up near Coney Island, where the play and film are set, and his Uncle Max had a frankfurter stand on the boardwalk called Max's Busy Bee but offered a Hawaiian motif."
