= Ruth Mitchell (stage manager) =

American stage manager

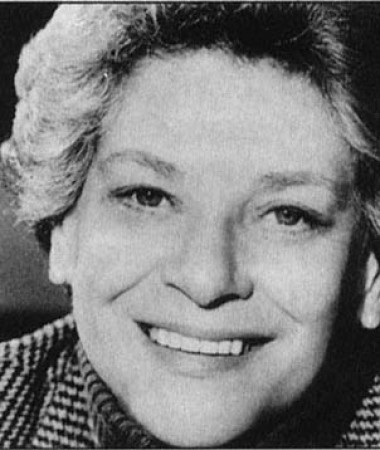
- Born: Ruth Kornfeld; 1919
- Died: November 3, 2000 (80-81)
- Known for: Stage Manager
- Partner: Florence Klotz

Ruth Mitchell (born Ruth Kornfeld; 1919 – November 3, 2000) was an American stage manager, director, producer and the assistant to the acclaimed director and producer Harold Prince, working on Broadway from the late 1940s through the late 1990s. She is known best as the original production stage manager of The Phantom of the Opera and Sweeney Todd, the Demon Barber of Fleet Street, both on Broadway.

Over her career, Mitchell stage managed over 50 Broadway productions, many of which are considered some of the most popular and influential of all time. With a flair for the dramatic, Hal Prince called her the "chicest stage manager on Broadway", even though she was known to also cuss out stagehands. Her extensive production files are archived and accessible at the New York Public Library for the Performing Arts.

== Early life ==
Born Ruth Kornfeld in Newark, New Jersey in 1919, to parents Anton and Miriam Kornfeld, Mitchell grew up attending Broadway shows and began her career in the theatre as a performer. She appeared in the ensemble of the musicals The Time, the Place and the Girl (1942) and Follow the Girls (1944). On her third show, Annie Get Your Gun (1946), she began work as the assistant to the director, Joshua Logan. Even though she performed on stage as well, Mitchell found her true calling as a broadway Stage Manager. She went on to stage manage two plays directed by Logan: Happy Birthday (1946) and Mister Roberts (1948). She also was stage manager on three important musicals, The King and I (1951), Pipe Dream (1955) and Bells Are Ringing (1956).

== Career ==
In 1957, Mitchell worked with Harold Prince for the first time when she stage managed West Side Story, which he and his partner Robert E. Griffith produced. After her next show, Gypsy (1959), Mitchell would work exclusively on Prince productions for the following 40 years until her retirement. During the 1960s she was the stage manager on such shows as Fiorello! (1959), A Funny Thing Happened on the Way to the Forum (1962), She Loves Me (1963), Fiddler on the Roof (1964), Cabaret (1966) and Zorba (1968).

During the 1970s, Mitchell helped direct and produce Broadway productions of Company (1970), Follies (1971), The Great God Brown (1972), A Little Night Music (1973), Candide (1974) and Pacific Overtures (1976). Mitchell was assistant director to Hal Prince On the Twentieth Century (1978), Sweeney Todd (1979), Play Memory (1984), End of the World (1984), The Phantom of the Opera (1988), Kiss of the Spider Woman (1993) and Show Boat (1994). She was a producer on Merrily We Roll Along (1981), A Doll's Life (1982), Grind (1985) and Roza (1987). Mitchell was involved in the early stages of Parade (1999), but her ill health eventually required her to leave the production.

Mitchell's career was notable not only for being involved in many of the most acclaimed post-World War II era musicals of the second half of the twentieth century, but for her success. In a career that is now dominated by women, Ruth Mitchell was one of the first female stage managers, and helped legitimize the career for others.

== Personal life and death ==
Mitchell's partner, Florence Klotz, was a Tony Award-winning costume designer who worked on many shows with Mitchell and Hal Prince. Ruth Mitchell died at the age of 81 on November 3, 2000, in New York.
