= Seth A. Goldstein =

American theater producer

- Education: Ithaca College
- Occupation: Theatre Producer
- Years active: 1999-Present
- Awards: Tony Award, Drama Desk Award

Seth A. Goldstein is a two-time Tony Award-winning, multiplatform American theater producer with a history of significant artistic and management achievement.

== Biography ==
Seth A. Goldstein is an American theatrical producer and media executive. He is a two-time Tony Award winner with a diverse career spanning Broadway, television, and international theatre production. His Broadway credits include The Lehman Trilogy (Tony Award), Hello, Dolly! (Tony Award), Water for Elephants (Tony Award nomination), Gutenberg! The Musical! (Tony Award nomination), The Prom (Tony Award nomination), and A Doll's House, Part 2 (Tony Award nomination). He is also a producer of The Devil Wears Prada, which opened in London’s West End.

Goldstein developed and produces The Moblees, an award-winning preschool television series that airs on CBC in Canada, AmebaTV in the United States, and internationally on YouTube. The brand includes albums (nominated for a Juno Award), an app, and live appearances worldwide. He contributed to the development of Avenue Q and produced acclaimed projects including Shakespeare’s R&J and Christine Jorgensen Reveals. Goldstein previously ran The Splinter Group, a theatrical general management company that oversaw nearly 50 productions, before merging it with Daryl Roth Productions. He is a graduate of Ithaca College and a member of the Broadway League, serving on its Labor and Business Development Committees.

== Personal life ==
Goldstein is a 1999 graduate of Ithaca College in Ithaca, New York. He married fellow Ithaca student, Juilliard alumna, and actress, Molly Stuart in 2004.

== The Splinter Group ==
Goldstein founded The Splinter Group, a theatrical production and general management office in New York City. In 2003, the company produced Joe Calarco's Shakespeare’s R&J in London's West End and throughout the UK. Two years later Christine Jorgensen Reveals premiered at Dodger Stages in New York City. The show, which received a 2005 Drama Desk Award, played three separate engagements Off-Broadway, and toured to Boston, Edinburgh and Dublin. From 2003 to 2011, the company provided general management services to nearly 60 festivals and theatrical productions including Imaginocean!, The Ohmies, and The Toxic Avenger.

In January 2011, the Splinter Group partnered with Daryl Roth Productions to launch DR Theatrical Management. The company offered “general management, executive producing, and event production services for Off-Broadway commercial productions”. The new company was led by Goldstein and Adam Hess, former lead of Roth's venue management team.

== The Moblees ==
In 2011, Goldstein developed and produced The Ohmies: Morning Wish Garden, a theatrical experience for preschoolers and early elementary children created by Laurie Miller and Benjamin Tollefson that encourages children to actively engage with the characters and story by physically playing along with each musical adventure. They worked with entertainment and child development experts in efforts to ensure the story was not only appropriate for preschool audiences, but that it “delivered genuine enjoyment and value for both kids and the adults who care for and about them”. In 2013, The Ohmies made the first of two appearances at the White House Easter Egg Roll. In 2014 The Ohmies was relaunched as The Moblees, a live-action interactive musical television series for young children broadcast on Kids’ CBC in Canada and streamed on platforms worldwide. The app received a Canadian Screen Award nomination and won a Cynopsis Kids !magination Award The Moblees: Songs from the Hit TV Show album was released in 2018 and was nominated for a JUNO Award for Children's Album of the Year.

== Awards ==
Goldstein has been credited as a producer on several commercial theatrical productions in New York City including Once Upon a Mattress, Water for Elephants (Tony Award nomination), Gutenberg! The Musical! (Tony Award nomination), The Lehman Trilogy (Tony Award); The Prom (Tony Award nomination); Hello, Dolly! (Tony Award); A Doll’s House, Part 2 (Tony Award nomination); The Glass Menagerie; The Front Page; and Steve Martin’s Meteor Shower. He has been nominated for Tony Awards as a producer for A Doll’s House, Part 2, The Prom, and Gutenberg! The Musical! and won Tony Awards in 2017 for Hello, Dolly! and 2022 for The Lehman Trilogy. He was also nominated for a Drama Desk Award for The Front Page, and won the award for Christine Jorgensen Reveals, The Prom and Hello Dolly!.
