= Craig Balsam =

American entrepreneur

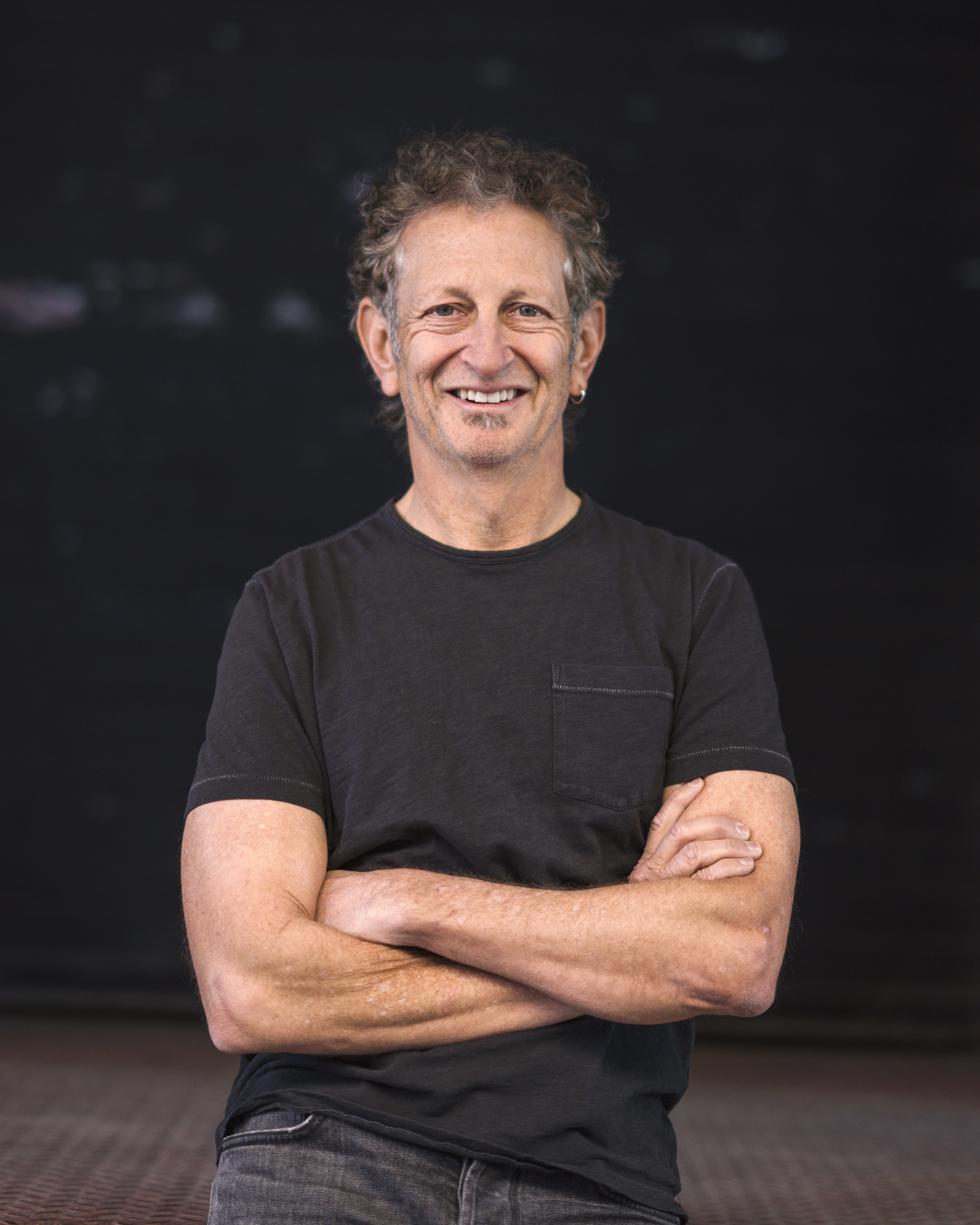
- Craig Balsam by Robbie Quinn
- Education: Emory University, NYU School of Law
- Notable work: Razor & Tie, Kidz Bop
- Title: Music Executive / Theatrical Producer

Craig Balsam is an American entertainment industry entrepreneur, six-time Tony Award-winning theatrical producer and Grammy-nominated film producer. He is co-founder of the New York City-based independent music company Razor & Tie as well as the children's music brand Kidz Bop.

== Career ==
=== Razor & Tie ===
After earning a juris doctor degree at NYU School of Law and practicing in New York corporate firms in the late 1980s, Balsam and his friend Cliff Chenfeld co-founded an independent music company. Named for the required uniform of the lucrative profession that they left behind, Razor & Tie went on to sell over 40 million units, generate billions of streams and win multiple Grammy Awards. Balsam and Chenfeld owned and operated indie Razor & Tie for almost 30 years and completed a sale of the business in late 2018 to Concord Music.

During that 30-year period, Razor & Tie became one of the largest privately owned labels and publishing companies in North America. The label's first release in 1990, a nostalgic compilation titled “The 70s Preservation Society Presents Those Fabulous 70s”, proved a multi-million-selling blockbuster and was followed by a series of hugely popular music compilations and DVDs, including “Disco Fever”, “Totally 80s”, “Monsters of Rock”, “Monster Ballads”, "Living in the '90s", "Goin' South", “Darrin’s Dance Grooves” and many others. The unprecedented success of these and other compilations and the creation of its own in-house media buying business (Razor & Tie Media) created one of the largest independent direct response music companies in the United States.

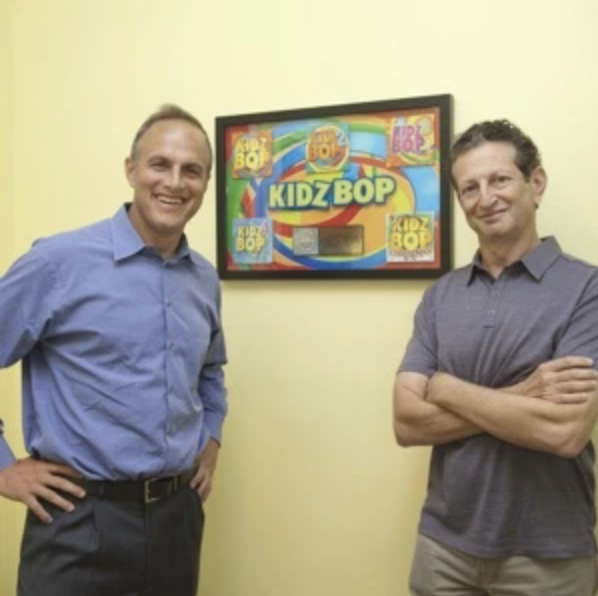
"Hits by Ke$ha, including 'TiK ToK', have been reimagined by Kidz Bop. The music franchise was started by New York dads Cliff Chenfeld and Craig Balsam."

In the early 90s, Razor & Tie began a reissue label, releasing on CD hundreds of classic albums and career retrospectives by a range of landmark artists, including Glen Campbell, King Curtis, the Partridge Family, Don Covay, James Carr, Merle Haggard, among many others. In ensuing years, an eclectic roster of artists were signed to the label’s new music division, including such icons as Jon Batiste, The Pretty Reckless, Joan Baez, Graham Parker, Marshall Crenshaw, Dar Williams, All That Remains, and Brand New. In 2014, Razor & Tie launched the Washington Square imprint, showcasing a number of indie and alternative artists.

Razor & Tie Music Publishing launched in 2007, a songwriter-friendly and service-oriented division with an aggressive approach to multi-media song placement, royalty administration and artist and writer career development — Razor & Tie Publishing later became a notable indie music publisher with number one hits across several genres and a synch business.

=== Kidz Bop ===
In 2001, Balsam co-founded, with Chenfeld, the #1 children’s music brand KIDZ BOP, featuring today’s biggest pop hits "sung by kids for kids". The children's music phenomenon has sold tens of millions of albums and generated billions of streams since its debut in 2001, with several successful nationwide Kidz Bop Live shows along the way. Numerous Kidz Bop alumni became prominent entertainers, such as Zendaya, Olivia Holt, Becky G, Ross Lynch, Noah Munck, and singers and Broadway stars such as Jayna Elise and Elijah Johnson.

The best-selling series has had 24 Top 10 debuts on the Billboard 200; only three artists in history—The Beatles, The Rolling Stones and Barbra Streisand—have had more Top 10 albums and KIDZ BOP was named Billboard's "#1 Kids' Artist" for eight consecutive years.

=== Theater and film production ===
Balsam has served as producer and co-producer on a number of theatrical productions and has won six Tony Awards, including for the 2019 “Best Musical” Tony winner Hadestown, 2022 "Best Play" Tony winner The Lehman Trilogy, 2024 "Best Play" Tony winner Stereophonic, 2024 "Best Revival of a Musical" Tony winner Merrily We Roll Along, 2025 "Best Revival of a Musical" Tony winner Sunset Boulevard, and 2026 "Best Play" Tony winner Liberation. He also produced Hadestown and Stereophonic on the West End in London. His other theater projects include playwright-actor Heidi Schreck's Tony Award-nominated What the Constitution Means to Me, a finalist for the 2019 Pulitzer Prize for Drama and winner of the New York Drama Critics' Circle “Best American Play” of 2019; Hangmen by Martin McDonagh, which received five Tony nominations; and Job, by Max Friedlich. In 2020, Balsam was a lead producer presenting the first Broadway production of Martin McDonagh's Hangmen, which won the 2016 Olivier Award for “Best New Play". He received a 2026 Lucille Lortel Award for the off-Broadway "Outstanding Musical" winner Mexodus and was a producer of the 2026 Broadway revival of Other Desert Cities starring Julia Louis-Dreyfus. In addition to Mexodus, Balsam has produced off-Broadway shows including The Unknown with Sean Hayes, Tru with Jesse Tyler Ferguson, and Igor Golyak’s Delirium at Irondale in Brooklyn.

Balsam was executive producer of the Hadestown Broadway cast recording and the off-Broadway cast recording of Duncan Sheik’s Alice by Heart. With Lin-Manuel Miranda, Michael Croiter and others, he co-produced the Broadway cast recording for New York, New York.

Balsam has also served as executive producer on a number of films, including HBO's Grammy-nominated Stevie Van Zandt: Disciple (2024); 2009's Joan Baez: How Sweet The Sound, a comprehensive documentary produced in association with WNET for PBS’ American Masters series; 2014's musical romantic comedy-drama The Last Five Years, co-starring Anna Kendrick and Jeremy Jordan; and 2016's Women Who Kill.

In October 2026, Balsam, along with Mara Isaacs and Thomas M. Neff, was honored with the TDF Founders Award for his work in creating access performances for neurodivergent adults.

== Personal life ==
Balsam was born in Newark, New Jersey and grew up in Millburn, New Jersey. He has a BA from Emory University and a JD from NYU School of Law. He and his wife Jodi Balsam, a Professor of Clinical Law and Director of the Sports Law Clinic at Brooklyn Law School, live in Manhattan and have three grown children.
