= Robert Fryer =

American film producer

- Born: November 18, 1920; Washington, D.C., U.S.
- Died: May 28, 2000 (aged 79); Los Angeles, California, U.S.
- Occupations: theatrical producer, film producer
- Years active: 1951–1988

Robert Sherwood Fryer (November 18, 1920 - May 28, 2000) was an American theatrical and film producer. Beginning in the early 1950s, Robert Fryer produced and co-produced many Broadway hits. Some of his most notable theatrical productions include: A Tree Grows in Brooklyn, Wonderful Town, Auntie Mame, Redhead, Chicago, On The Twentieth Century, and Sweeney Todd. His notable film productions include: Mame, Voyage of the Damned, The Boys from Brazil, and The Shining.

== Early life ==
Robert Fryer was born in Washington, D.C. in 1920. His father was a successful department store manager, but died of tuberculosis in 1929. Fryer spent the bulk of his childhood in Cleveland, Ohio, where his mother raised him and his sister, Eleanor (later Massell). Fryer graduated from Case Western Reserve University, and served in the Army during World War II.

== Theatrical career ==
After the War, Robert worked in New York City as an assistant to the producer of the Old Vic season at the Century Theatre. His first Broadway hit was A Tree Grows in Brooklyn" which he co-produced with George Abbott. Robert Fryer won multiple Tony Awards, and the plays he produced received a total of 37 Tony Awards. Between 1971 and 1988 he was the director of the Center Theatre Group's Ahmanson Theatre in Los Angeles. Shortly after his death in 2000, Fryer was posthumously inducted into the American Theater Hall of Fame.

== Film career ==
Fryer's most memorable film production was The Shining. Fryer was once quoted as stating, "[m]ovies pay the rent but stage is my true love.".
