= Margo Lion =

American theatre producer (1944–2020)

Margo Allison Lion (October 13, 1944 – January 24, 2020) was a producer for plays and musicals both on Broadway and off-Broadway, known for her role in producing the stage and screen hit Hairspray. Combined, the works Lion produced won 20 Tony Awards and a Pulitzer Prize.

== Early life and theater career ==
Lion was born in Baltimore, Maryland, the daughter of Gloria (Amburgh) and Albert Lion, whose company Lion Brothers produced embroidered emblems. She was of German Jewish heritage. She graduated from George Washington University. She worked for Senators Daniel B. Brewster of Maryland and Robert F. Kennedy before becoming a teacher at the Town School in New York.

She started her producing career with Lyn Austin at The Music-Theater Group/Lenox Arts Center. Her first commercial production was How I Got That Story in 1982. Later off-Broadway productions included the 1987 version of Martha Clarke's The Garden of Earthly Delights, Frankie and Johnny in the Clair de Lune and The Cryptogram.

Her first Broadway production was I Hate Hamlet in 1991.

In 1987, Lion commissioned George Wolfe, Susan Birkenhead and Luther Henderson to write a show about Jelly Roll Morton. That musical became the 1992 Broadway show, Jelly's Last Jam, starring Gregory Hines. The musical was nominated for 11 Tony Awards and won three. It ran for 569 performances.

In 1993–94, Lion produced Angels in America: Millennium Approaches and Perestroika followed by the 1995 production of Seven Guitars. Angels in America: Millennium Approaches won the 1993 Pulitzer Prize for Drama.

In 1997, Lion produced Triumph of Love, based on a 1732 comedy by Pierre de Marivaux. It closed after 85 performances. Shortly after its run, while watching John Waters' 1988 film, Hairspray she had the idea to adapt the film into a musical. She recruited Marc Shaiman, a Hollywood film composer, for the musical's score. Four years later, in August 2002, the musical Hairspray premiered on Broadway and became an immediate commercial and critical hit.

Following Hairspray, Lion produced the Broadway productions Caroline, or Change (2004), The Wedding Singer (2006), and Radio Golf (2007) as well as Harlem Song at The Apollo. Lion also garnered a Tony Award for Elaine Stritch at Liberty.

She was the producer of the musical adaptation of Catch Me If You Can which played at Seattle's 5th Avenue Theatre in July 2009, as well as musical adaptations of Mira Nair's Monsoon Wedding, and Like Water for Chocolate.

Lion was an adjunct professor at the Tisch School of the Arts of New York University. She also served as Co-Chair to President Barack Obama's Arts Policy Committee during the 2008 Presidential Election and was appointed in 2009 as Co-Chair of President's Committee on the Humanities and the Arts.

She died on January 24, 2020, in Manhattan after a brain aneurysm. She was 75 years old.
