= The Araca Group =

Theater production company

- Type: LLC
- Industry: Theater, Producing, and Merchandising
- Founded: 1997
- Headquarters: New York City, U.S.
- Key people: Founders; Michael Rego, Matthew Rego, Hank Unger
- Website: Official site

The Araca Group is a live entertainment merchandise and production company founded in 1997 by partners Matthew Rego, Michael Rego, and Hank Unger. First achieving notoriety as producers of the musical Urinetown, the company has gradually become more involved in merchandising following the success of Wicked.

== History ==
=== Early history ===
Brothers Matthew and Michael Rego met Hank Unger during a community theater production of The Music Man in 1985. Michael Rego and Hank Unger attended Syracuse University together, while Matthew Rego attended The University of Michigan. After graduating college, the three moved to New York to pursue theatrical endeavors. After several projects, including a production of Caryl Churchill's Cloud Nine, Michael and Matthew Rego chose to attend graduate programs. Michael Rego attended New York Law School, while Matthew Rego pursued business at Fordham University. After graduating, the partners decided to once again try producing.

=== Founding and early productions ===
The Araca Group was officially founded in 1997, "Araca" being the surname of the Regos' grandfather, Charlie Araca. Araca's first Off-Broadway production was Skyscraper by Pulitzer Prize winner David Auburn. The Araca Group also provided general management, marketing and production supervision to a series of Off-Off Broadway productions, including Stephen Belber's The Death of Frank. Soon after, The Araca Group produced the independent film 30 Days. Other productions included James Naughton: Street of Dreams directed by Mike Nichols, The Vagina Monologues, which included performances Off-Broadway, as well as in Los Angeles, Chicago, San Francisco, Toronto, and London, and an Off-Broadway production of The Laramie Project.

=== Urinetown and financial success ===
During the intermission of a production of Urinetown at the 1999 New York International Fringe Festival, playwright David Auburn called Michael Rego and insisted that the three partners see the show. After following Auburn's suggestion, the partners decided to produce it, joining with Dodger Theatricals. Described by Urinetown writer Greg Kotis as "upstarts, buccaneering producers eager for a horse to bet on," the company was instrumental in attaching director John Rando to the production and facilitating the move to an Off-Broadway production in May 2001. The musical moved to Broadway in September 2001, where it achieved much success, both critically and financially, receiving 10 Tony Award nominations and playing for 965 performances. Araca's second Broadway production was Terrence McNally's Frankie and Johnny in the Clair de Lune, which starred Edie Falco and Stanley Tucci. This production opened to critical acclaim, and recouped its investment in a record-breaking six weeks. The production was nominated for two Tony Awards. Off Broadway, The Araca Group's production of Debbie Does Dallas: The Musical opened for a six-month run, followed by productions in San Francisco, Reno, Melbourne, and Johannesburg.

=== Wicked ===
The Araca Group next co-produced Wicked, a musical based on the novel by Gregory Maguire that retells the story of The Wizard of Oz. Premiering at The Gershwin Theatre on 30 October 2003, Wicked received three Tony Awards and is currently among the top grossing shows on Broadway. Wicked would go on to have subsequent productions all over the world including London, Germany, Australia, Japan, and an upcoming debut in the Netherlands. Wicked has also had great success in North America with two tours and long running performances in Chicago, Los Angeles, and San Francisco.

=== Other productions and marketing/merchandising ===
Other Broadway productions also produced by The Araca Group following the successes of Wicked. These productions included Match, 'night, Mother, The Good Body, and The Wedding Singer. Merchandising and marketing services were also expanded around this time to include The 25th Annual Putnam County Spelling Bee, The Pirate Queen, The Farnsworth Invention, Rock 'n' Roll, The Wedding Singer, Passing Strange, and the West End production of Hairspray. Araca continues to produce many Off Broadway and Broadway shows. Some of the most notable include Rock of Ages, Boeing-Boeing, Lend Me a Tenor, A View From the Bridge, and The Merchant of Venice. The Araca Group also continues to provide merchandising services to many productions, both on Broadway and around the world. Some of the most notable merchandising opportunities include The Book of Mormon, Beautiful: The Carole King Musical, War Paint, Groundhog Day, Charlie and the Chocolate Factory, Come From Away, Anastasia, Matilda the Musical, Rodgers and Hammerstein's Cinderella, and The Humans.

== Credits ==
=== Broadway production credits ===
- Urinetown: The Musical
- Frankie and Johnny in the Clair de Lune
- Wicked (musical)
- The Wedding Singer (musical)
- 'night, Mother
- The Good Body
- Match
- The 25th Annual Putnam County Spelling Bee
- Boeing-Boeing
- 13: The Musical
- Rock of Ages
- Lend Me a Tenor
- A View From the Bridge
- The Merchant of Venice
- The SpongeBob Musical
- Disgraced
- Jagged Little Pill (musical)

=== Off-Broadway production credits ===
- The Vagina Monologues
- The Laramie Project
- Debbie Does Dallas
- Fault Lines

=== Broadway merchandise credits ===
- Wicked
- The Wedding Singer (musical)
- The 25th Annual Putnam County Spelling Bee
- Passing Strange
- Boeing-Boeing
- 13: The Musical
- Rock of Ages
- Next to Normal
- 9 to 5: The Musical
- Guys and Dolls (2009 Revival)
- God of Carnage
- Elf the Musical
- Catch Me If You Can
- The Scottsboro Boys
- The Book of Mormon

=== Other merchandise credits ===
- Jersey Boys in Las Vegas, London, and Australia
- Wicked National tours, Chicago, Los Angeles, San Francisco, London, Tokyo, Stuttgart, Melbourne, and Sydney
- Dickens Unplugged in London
- Spring Awakening London
- Chicago Australia
- Peepshow in Las Vegas
- The Toxic Avenger Off-Broadway
- Ghost the Musical London
- Shrek the Musical National Tour
- 9 to 5 National Tour
- Reba McEntire
