= Roger Berlind =

American theater producer (1930–2020)

Roger Stuart Berlind
- Born: June 27, 1930; Brooklyn, New York City
- Died: December 18, 2020 (aged 90); Manhattan, New York City
- Occupation: Businessman
- Known for: Co-founder of Carter, Berlind, Potoma & Weill, well-known Broadway producer
- Spouses: Helen Polk Clark (m. 1962; died 1975) Brook Radway Wheeler (m. 1979)
- Children: 4, including William Berlind
- Parent(s): Peter Sydney Berlind; Mae Miller Berlind

Roger Stuart Berlind (June 27, 1930 – December 18, 2020) was a New York City theatrical producer who won 25 Tony Awards and a board member of Lehman Brothers Holdings, Inc. and Lehman Brothers Inc. He was one of the founders of Carter, Berlind, Potoma & Weill in 1960, a company that would later through Sandy Weill become Shearson Loeb Rhoades, which was eventually sold to American Express in 1981 for approximately $930 million in stock.

== Early life ==
Berlind was born to a Jewish family in New York City, to Mae (née Miller) and Peter Sydney Berlind, a hospital administrator. Raised in Woodmere, New York, he attended Woodmere Academy (since renamed as Lawrence Woodmere Academy). He attended Princeton University and received his bachelor's degree in English in 1954 after completing an 82-page long senior thesis titled "The Quest of the Ideal in the Plays of Yeats and Synge". Berlind was a member of the Princeton Tower Club. The crash of Eastern Air Lines Flight 66 on June 24, 1975, killed his wife, Helen Polk Clark, and three of his four children.

== Theatrical career ==
His theatrical producing career began in 1976. Since then, he has produced or co-produced more than forty plays and musicals on Broadway and many off-Broadway and regional theatre productions as well. Berlind has won 25 Tony Awards, more than any other individual. His Broadway productions have won numerous Tony Awards. Among them are Amadeus, Nine, Long Day's Journey Into Night, Ain't Misbehavin', Guys and Dolls, Hamlet, Passion, A Funny Thing Happened on the Way to the Forum, Copenhagen, Kiss Me, Kate, Proof, the Pulitzer Prize-winning Anna in the Tropics, the 2004 revival of Wonderful Town, Curtains, and Deuce.

In 2003, the 360-seat Roger S. Berlind Theatre opened in the McCarter Theatre Center at Princeton University. Princeton's Roger S. Berlind Professorship in the Humanities, previously held by Joyce Carol Oates, is currently held by Tracy K. Smith. In 2009, he was inducted into the American Theater Hall of Fame.

== See also ==
- Cogan, Berlind, Weill & Levitt
- Theatre
- New York City
