= Jujamcyn Theaters =

American theatrical producer and theatre owner

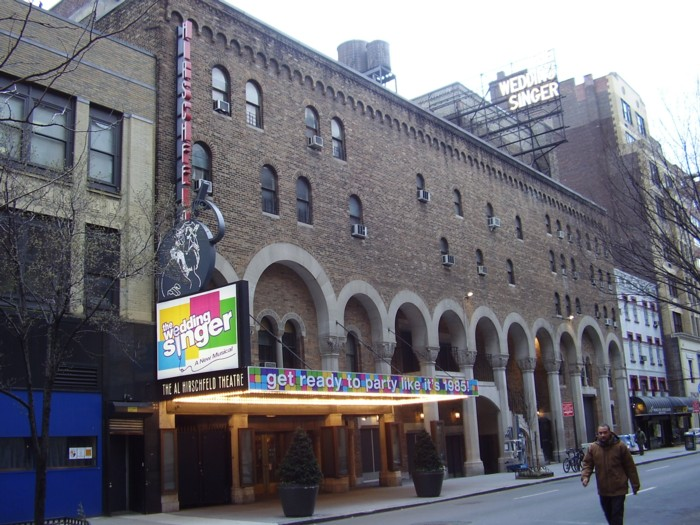
The Al Hirschfeld Theatre, 2006

Jujamcyn Theaters LLC /dʒuːˈdʒæmsɪn/, formerly the Jujamcyn Amusement Corporation, is a theatrical producing and theatre-ownership company in New York City. For many years Jujamcyn was owned by James H. Binger, former chairman of Honeywell, and his wife, Virginia McKnight Binger. It was later owned by Rocco Landesman and most recently by Jordan Roth.

In July 2023, Jujamcyn merged with the Ambassador Theatre Group. Jordan Roth sold a 93 percent stake in Jujamcyn's five theaters to ATG and Providence Equity. Before its merger with ATG, Jujamcyn owned five of the 41 Broadway theaters and was the third-largest theatre owner on Broadway, behind the Shubert Organization and the Nederlander Organization.

== History ==
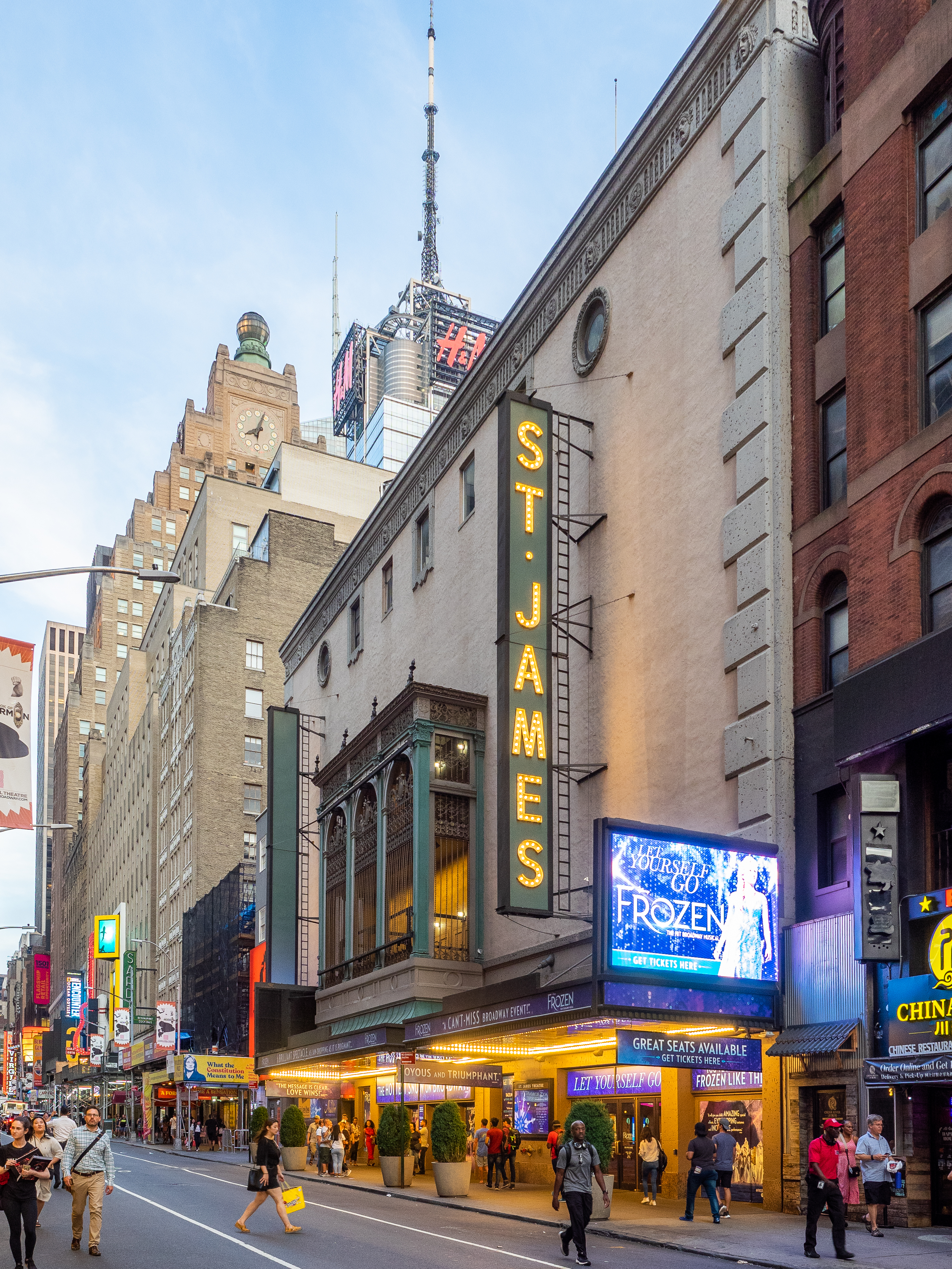
The St. James Theatre, 2019

William L. McKnight, former chairman of 3M, owned several theatres, two in New York and one in Boston. McKnight's daughter, Virginia McKnight Binger and her husband, James H. Binger, a top executive at Honeywell, shared a love of theatre. In 1976 when William McKnight wanted to sell his theatres, Binger stepped in to assist. He found the business fascinating, and after paying the gift tax and selling the Colonial Theatre in Boston, he and Virginia agreed to own and later expand the operation on Broadway.

Jujamcyn derives its name from the names of McKnight's grandchildren, the Bingers' children: Ju[dith], Jam[es], and Cyn[thia]. Over time Binger expanded Jujamcyn to five theatres to create the third-largest theatre-owning company on Broadway. The five Jujamcyn theatres are:

1. St. James Theatre (acquired in 1957 by McKnight)
2. Al Hirschfeld Theatre (formerly the Martin Beck Theatre, acquired in 1966 by McKnight)
3. August Wilson Theatre (formerly the Virginia Theatre, acquired in 1981)
4. Eugene O'Neill Theatre (acquired in 1982)
5. Walter Kerr Theatre (formerly the Ritz Theatre, acquired in 1981)

In 1987 Binger brought in Rocco Landesman to run Jujamcyn. Landesman was a successful theatrical producer and was friendly with Binger from previous theatrical productions and a shared interest in racehorses. Over the next 17 years, Landesman, Binger and the Jujamcyn organization would produce and house a successful string of Broadway hits. Including box office juggernaut The Producers, which won a record 12 Tony Awards in 2001.

=== After the Bingers' deaths ===
Virginia Binger died in 2002, and James Binger died in 2004.

Rocco Landesman, producer and President of Jujamcyn since 1987, announced that he planned to buy Jujamcyn Theatres, telling the New York Times that he had a long-standing understanding with Binger that he would buy Jujamcyn's five playhouses. The theatres had an estimated net asset value of about $30 million. Landesman closed the deal in February 2005 for $30M, but then tried to sell a 50% stake in the group for $50M to enable investment in the Cincinnati Reds baseball team – his group lost out to Robert Castellini.

In 2009 after 22 years with Jujamcyn, Landesman was tapped by the Obama administration to take a position in Washington as chairman of the National Endowment for the Arts. That year, Landesman sold a half interest in Jujamcyn to Jordan Roth, a successful 33-year-old theatrical producer who had joined the company in 2005 as resident producer and vice president. Roth, as president, assumed full control of Jujamcyn as Landesman departed for the NEA. From his first year, Roth began identifying a new era of shows for the company’s theaters with his first hits including, Spring Awakening, with eight Tony Awards, Grey Gardens, with three, and his 2009 revival of Hair.

In 2013, Roth bought the majority stake of Jujamcyn, making him the youngest principal owner of a Broadway theatre chain. Since Roth took over, Jujamcyn theaters have been home to notable shows including Tony-award winners The Book of Mormon, Springsteen on Broadway, Kinky Boots, A Gentleman's Guide to Love and Murder, and Clybourne Park among many others. As part of a settlement with the United States Department of Justice in 2021, Jujamcyn agreed to improve disabled access at its five Broadway theaters. The same year, Roth hired SeatGeek to manage ticket sales for all five of Jujamcyn's theaters; previously, Ticketmaster had been in charge of ticket sales.

In February 2023, it was announced that Jujamcyn would merge with Ambassador Theatre Group, although it was unclear what the combined company would be called. The agreement would give the combined company seven Broadway theaters, and Jordan Roth was to be appointed as the creative director for the company. In July 2023, Jordan Roth sold a 93 percent stake in Jujamcyn's five theaters to ATG and Providence Equity. In exchange, Roth bought a 7 percent ownership stake in ATG's two other Broadway theaters, the Lyric Theatre and the Hudson Theatre.

== List of theaters ==
Theatre	Address	Seats
St. James Theatre	246 West 44th Street	1,701
Al Hirschfeld Theatre	302 West 45th Street	1,412
August Wilson Theatre	245 West 52nd Street	1,222
Eugene O'Neill Theatre	230 West 49th Street	1,030
Walter Kerr Theatre	218 West 48th Street	931

=== Former theaters ===
- Morris A. Mechanic Theatre, Baltimore (1995–2000) sold to SFX Theatricals
- Royal George Theatre, Chicago (1993–1997) sold to Reading Entertainment
- Weidner Center, Green Bay, Wisconsin (1995–1998) producing partner
- Orpheum Theatre and State Theatre, Minneapolis (1995–2000) producing partner, sold to SFX Theatricals
- Orpheum Theater, Omaha (1995–2000) producing partner, sold to SFX Theatricals
- Portland Civic Auditorium, Portland, Oregon (1994–2000) producing partner, sold to SFX Theatricals
- Ordway Music Theatre, St. Paul (1992–1996)

== See also ==
- Broadway theatre
- Jujamcyn Award - award given for 20+ years to outstanding theatre organizations
