= Nederlander =

Nederlander may refer to:

== People ==
- James M. Nederlander (1922–2016), chairman of the Nederlander Organization
- Gladys Nederlander (1925–2008), theater and television producer
- Joseph Z. Nederlander (1927–2021), executive VP of the Nederlander Organization
- Robert Nederlander (born 1933), attorney and former president of the Nederlander Organization
- James L. Nederlander (born 1960), president of the Nederlander Organization

== Other ==
- Nederlander Organization, live theater operator
- SHN (theatres), live theater operator, Carole Shorenstein Hays and Robert Nederlander
- David T. Nederlander Theatre, 1,232-seat Broadway theater located in New York City
- James M. Nederlander Theatre, 2,253-seat theater located in Chicago
- De Grootste Nederlander (The Greatest Dutchman) was a 2004 public poll
