= Drury Lane Theatre =

Drury Lane Theatre may refer to:

- Theatre Royal, Drury Lane, a theatre in the Covent Garden area of London, England
- Drury Lane Theatre (Illinois), a theater near Chicago, United States

== See also ==
- Drury Lane (disambiguation)
