= Tony DeSantis =

American entrepreneur and theater owner (1914–2007)

- Born: Anthony Oswald DeSantis; January 5, 1914; Gary, Indiana, US
- Died: June 6, 2007 (aged 93); Oakbrook Terrace, Illinois, US
- Occupation: Theater producer
- Spouse: Lucille Cuzeli DeSantis
- Children: 2

Anthony DeSantis, KStJ (January 5, 1914 – June 6, 2007) was an American theater owner and entrepreneur known for the area's Drury Lane theatres. During DeSantis' lifetime, his empire included six separate theaters.

== Life and career ==
Beginning with his birth in Gary, Indiana, DeSantis began his career in show business playing trumpet in Chicago. In 1935, he was nearly killed in an explosion at the Glidden paint factory where he was working. He purchased a club in 1940 on Michigan Avenue before moving out of Chicago to nearby Evergreen Park, where he opened the Martinique Restaurant, which was highly acclaimed. In 1949 he erected a tent near his restaurant and began staging plays. in 1949 in a tent adjacent to the restaurant to attract customers. The productions were successful, so he built a brick-and-mortar theatre.

=== Drury Lane Theaters ===
London's 17th century Theatre Royal Drury Lane was the source for his theatre's names. His five suburban Chicago venues all offered reasonably priced dinner theatre that parents could take their children to. DeSantis claimed that alcohol sales were profitable; if you broke even when operating a theatre, you were successful.

- The first Chicago-area theatre was 1958's Drury Lane Evergreen Park. It closed in 2003 after 45 years of entertainment.
- Drury Lane Oak Brook Terrace premiered in 1984, and it benefited from what DeSantis had learned over the years. The facility uses local performers to keep costs down; the theatre is surrounded by bars, restaurants and banquet rooms; shows are limited to musicals; and there is no charge for parking.
- The first Drury Lane Water Tower Place debuted during 1976, but was shuttered eight years later. A new facility costing $7 million was launched on May 18, 2004. Six years later, it was acquired by the Broadway In Chicago company and rechristened Broadway Playhouse at Water Tower Place.
- The Drury Lane North theatre opened in 1976, but the Marriott Lincolnshire Resort purchased it soon after and it became the Marriott Theatre.
- The Drury Lane East theatre at McCormick Place also opened during the 1970s, but in less than a year it was closed.

Despite the occasional setback, his Drury Lane Theater empire grew steadily and DeSantis became a wealthy man. He was opposed to Chicago mafia involvement in Chicago show business and in 1958 was involved in an FBI sting against the Chicago mob. This led to a retaliatory explosion in his Martinique nightclub in 1962. In reflecting on his life in 2005, DeSantis said:

I suppose I could sit on a bench and drink martinis with a starlet on each arm. Nah. I work hard because I am just trying to keep alive.

== Honors and awards ==
In 1971, DeSantis was made an associate Officer of the Venerable Order of Saint John. This was followed in 1980 by a promotion to the rank of associate knight in the same Order. DeSantis was a very generous supporter of Roman Catholic charities in Chicago. Tony DeSantis died on 6 June 2007 at age 93 and his funeral mass was said at Holy Name Cathedral on 18 June 2007.

== Death and legacy ==
DeSantis died June 6, 2007, after being diagnosed with cancer. He was 93.

Tony's grandson, Kyle DeSantis, took over as President of Drury Lane Theatre in Oak Brook Terrace and Water Tower Place following Tony's death. In 2010, Drury Lane Water Tower Place was taken over by Broadway in Chicago. Increased production budgets has allowed Drury Lane Theatre in Oak Brook Terrace to modernize the stage, improve scenic design, increase the size of the orchestra, provide better costumes and talent cast. Chris Jones of the Chicago Tribune stated that the theatre had, "a real eye to excellence (drawing from both) the very talented, vibrant Chicago theater community (and) a national casting pool." In 2013, the facility unveiled the first phase of its multimillion-dollar renovation, including the Grand Ballroom 27,000 sq ft (2,500 m^{2}), the cocktail lounge, lobby and the English and French rooms. The second phase included refurbishing the Theatre Bar and Courtyard Restaurant.
