= Milton Rackmil =

Radio, record, and film company executive (1906–1992)

Milton R. Rackmil
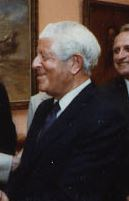
- Rackmil in 1983
- Born: February 12, 1906; New York City, U.S.
- Died: April 2, 1992 (aged 86); New York City, U.S.
- Education: B.A. New York University
- Occupations: Record and film producer
- Known for: co-founder of Decca Records; head of Universal Pictures. He was also Vice Chairman of MCA, Inc. from 1963 - 1972 after the company merged with Decca and Universal.
- Spouses: Marie Stevelman (m. 1928; div. 1952) Vivian Blaine (m. 1959; div. 1961) Gladys Lenore Blum (m. 1963; div. 1973) Joan Crane (m. 1975)
- Children: 1
- Relatives: David Crane (stepson)

Milton R. Rackmil (February 12, 1906 – April 2, 1992) was the co-founder of Decca Records and head of Universal Pictures and Vice-Chairman of MCA Inc.

== Early life and education ==
Rackmil was born to a Jewish family on the Lower East Side of New York City and grew up in Brooklyn. He graduated from New York University with a degree in accounting.

== Career ==
After school in the 1920s, he worked for the Brunswick Radio Corporation in Manhattan and later moved to its plant in Scranton, Pennsylvania, where he served as general manager and controller. In 1932, he helped to start the Brunswick Radio Corporation. In 1934, he left Brunswick with two co-workers and co-founded Decca Records (along with Jack Kapp and Edward Lewis) in New York City, first serving as treasurer then as vice president in 1945, executive vice president in 1946, and president in 1949. Although many believed that radio would displace record sales, Rackmil bet on the opposite: that radio would spur record sales. He was correct and Decca, focusing on big name stars and 35 cent records with a top hit on each side, became the dominant company in popular music. His label featured Bing Crosby, Ella Fitzgerald, Glenn Miller, Guy Lombardo, The Dorsey Brothers, Duke Ellington, Count Basie, the Mills Brothers, Al Jolson, the Andrews Sisters, Woody Herman, Lawrence Welk, the McGuire Sisters, Teresa Brewer, Ethel Waters, and the Four Aces. In 1952, the federal government filed an antitrust suit against Decca Records, its overseas sister company Decca Records Company of London, and a third unrelated company, alleging that they had illegally colluded to divide up the international markets; later that year, under a consent decree, Decca Records agreed to desist from said activities.

Thereafter, Rackmil entered the film industry in 1951—which many believed was on the decline due to the advent of television—with Decca Records becoming the largest shareholder in the Universal Pictures Company; in 1952, he became its president. Applying the same strategy as he did with records, he shifted Universal's strategy from low budget productions with B-grade actors to big, lavish productions utilizing maximum star power, employing actors such as Cary Grant, James Stewart, Kirk Douglas, Doris Day, and Rock Hudson. He produced the films The Glenn Miller Story (1954), Pillow Talk (1959), Spartacus (1960), and That Touch of Mink (1962). In 1962, MCA Inc. purchased both Decca Records and Universal Pictures. Rackmil became vice-chairman of MCA's board and remained the head of both the film and record companies until his retirement in 1972.

In 1962, Rackmil was awarded the "Motion Picture Pioneer of the Year" award by the Will Rogers Motion Picture Pioneers Foundation.

== Personal life ==
Rackmil was married four times:

- In 1928, he married Marie Stevelman. They had one daughter, Marlene Rackmil Salkin (married to Decca executive Martin P. Salkin). They divorced shortly after Marlene's eighteenth birthday.
- In 1959, he married American actress and singer Vivian Blaine; they divorced in 1961.
- In 1963, he married Gladys Lenore Blum, the ex-wife of songwriter Fred Stryker; they divorced in 1973 (Gladys would later marry theater owner and producer Robert Nederlander).
- In 1975, he married Joan Crane. He has a stepson, David Crane from Joan's first marriage to Philadelphia news anchor Gene Crane.

Rackmil was active in the Friars Club and served as president of the Record Industry Association.
