= Drury Lane (disambiguation) =

Drury Lane may refer to:

- Drury Lane, a street in London.
- Theatre Royal, Drury Lane, a theatre on the above street, itself commonly known simply as Drury Lane.
- Drury Lane (character), a character created by Ellery Queen, writing as Barnaby Ross.
- Drury Lane pantomime, the pantomime tradition at Theatre Royal, Drury Lane
- Drury Lane Theatre (Illinois), a group of six theatres in the Chicago area founded by Tony DeSantis.
- Drury Lane Water Tower Place, the newest of Chicago's Drury Lane Theatres, built in 2004.
