= Flood Brothers Disposal =

American waste management and recycling service

- Company type: Private
- Industry: Waste management
- Founded: 1930
- Headquarters: Oakbrook Terrace, IL, United States
- Area served: Chicago & Suburbs
- Key people: The Flood Family, Owners
- Services: Commercial and residential waste management, recycling services, dumpster and roll-off container rental

Flood Brothers Disposal is a family-owned waste management and recycling service based in Oakbrook Terrace, IL with offices in Chicago, IL. Flood Brothers Disposal's service area extends to 150 communities in the Chicago area. Flood Brothers is a member of the National Solid Waste Management Association, the Solid Waste Agency of Northern Cook County, the National Recycling Coalition, the Illinois Food Scrap Coalition, the National Waste & Recycling Association, and the Illinois Recycling Association.

== History ==
Flood Brothers Disposal started operations with one truck and one employee, at 139 N. Clark St. in Chicago, Illinois. In 1963, the center of operations moved to 5435 W. Chicago Ave. From 1970 to 1977, the company expanded to several additional locations. The company is currently based at 4827 W. Harrison St. in Chicago,

In 1988, Flood Brothers created an automated recycling center, and in 1990, became the first licensed special waste hauler in the Chicago community. In 1996, Flood Brothers Disposal opened an additional facility in Carol Stream, Illinois. As of 2014, Flood Brothers Disposal operates in more than 150 communities in the Chicago area.

== Awards ==
In 2015, Flood Brothers Disposal was named "2015 Illinois Medium Family Business of the Year" by Loyola University's Quinlan School of Business.
