= Orpheus Descending (film) =

- Promotional poster
- Genre: Drama; Romance
- Written by: Tennessee Williams; Peter Hall
- Directed by: Peter Hall
- Starring: Vanessa Redgrave; Kevin Anderson; Brad Sullivan
- Music by: Stephen Edwards
- Country of origin: United States
- Original language: English

Production
- Executive producer: Gladys Nederlander
- Producers: George Manasse; Stuart Goodman; Elizabeth Ireland McCann
- Production location: Jacksonville, Florida
- Cinematography: Mike Flash
- Editor: Edward Marnier
- Running time: 117 min

Original release
- Release: September 24, 1990

Orpheus Descending is a 1990 American television film starring Vanessa Redgrave and directed by Peter Hall. It is an adaptation of Tennessee Williams' play of the same name. Hall had directed Redgrave in an acclaimed Broadway production of the play a year earlier. The stage actors such as Redgrave, Kevin Anderson and Brad Sullivan reprised their roles for the film.

== Plot ==
Lady Torrance (Redgrave) is introduced as a disillusioned character; her Sicilian father was murdered by the Ku Klux Klan and she's been trapped in a miserable marriage for 20 years. Her tyrannical and bigoted husband is struck down by cancer. Then Lady Torrance meets the orpheuse, a young man named Val Xavier (Kevin Anderson), an Elvis Presley-inspired drifter. A romantic entanglement ensues as Lady Torrance puts behind the misery of marriage behind her and tries to find passion and happiness with Val.

== Cast ==
- Vanessa Redgrave as Lady Torrance
- Kevin Anderson as Val Xavier
- Brad Sullivan as Jabe Torrance
- Anne Twomey as Carol Cutrere
- Miriam Margolyes as Vee Talbott
- Sloane Shelton as Beulah Binnings
- Patti Allison as Dolly Hamma
- Manning Redwood as Sheriff Talbott
- Pat McNamara as Pee Wee Binnings
- Michael McCarty as Dog Hamma
- Marcia Lewis as Nurse Porter
