= Orpheus Descending =

1957 play by Tennessee Williams

First edition cover (New Directions, 1958)

Orpheus Descending is a three-act play by Tennessee Williams. It was first presented on Broadway on March 17, 1957, with Maureen Stapleton and Cliff Robertson, under the direction of Harold Clurman, but had only a brief run (68 performances) and modest success. It was revived on Broadway in 1989, directed by Peter Hall and starring Vanessa Redgrave and Kevin Anderson. The production ran for 13 previews and 97 performances.

The play is a rewrite of an earlier play by Williams called Battle of Angels, which was written in 1940. Williams wrote the character of Myra Torrance for Tallulah Bankhead, but she turned down the role, saying "The play is impossible, darling, but sit down and have a drink with me." The production previewed in Boston the same year, starring Miriam Hopkins. It was the first produced play written by Williams and by his account it "failed spectacularly". At one point, Boston's city censors and the City Council threatened to shut down the production over its "lascivious and immoral" language. Battle of Angels remained un-produced in New York for 34 years, until the Circle Repertory Company opened their sixth season with it in 1974, directed by Marshall W. Mason.

Williams was rewriting Battle of Angels by 1951. When Orpheus Descending appeared in 1957, Williams wrote: "On the surface it was and still is the tale of a wild-spirited boy who wanders into a conventional community of the South and creates the commotion of a fox in a chicken coop. But beneath that now familiar surface it is a play about unanswered questions that haunt the hearts of people and the difference between continuing to ask them...and the acceptance of prescribed answers that are not answers at all."

== Plot ==
In the Torrance Mercantile Store in a small Mississippi town, Dolly and Beulah, two gossiping housewives, tell each other that store owner Jabe Torrance has just returned from having surgery in Memphis, but is dying. Carol Cutrere, a socialite, comes in to make a phone call. A little later Val, a roaming singer and musician, arrives. Carol flirts with Val, insisting she has met him before in New Orleans, but he denies any prior knowledge of her. Lady Torrance, who now runs the store since her husband is ill, agrees to hire Val as a clerk.

After a few weeks, Val tells Lady about his wild past in New Orleans and admits that he once knew Carol. When David Cutrere, Carol's wealthy brother and Lady's former lover, enters the store, Lady tells him that she aborted his child when he left her. Val talks with Vee, the sheriff's wife, about her painting when Vee's husband, Talbot, catches him kissing her hand. Lady allows Val to stay at the store, but Val steals money from the cashbox when she leaves to get linens for the bed. He returns the money and wants to leave, but Lady begs him to stay.

On Easter, Jabe tells Lady he was responsible for her father's death and has a hemorrhage. At sunset, Vee says she has been blinded by a vision of the risen Christ and Val is yelled at by Vee's husband for helping her up. Vee's husband, Sheriff Talbot, tells him he has until sunrise to get out of town. Val is ready to leave but Lady tries to stop him. She tries to get the nurse to kill her husband with a lethal dose of morphine, but the nurse will not. Then Lady tells Val she is happily pregnant with his child, and tells Val she looks forward to a new life because of this.

Both walk about the newly decorated refreshment emporium adjoining the store, symbolizing the promise of a new start. As Val and Lady embrace, Val looks up to see that Jabe has torn a hole through his floor, and thus through the ceiling of the emporium, and is throwing coal oil into the place, setting it on fire while yelling out the upstairs window that Val has set the place on fire and is "robbing the place." Lady escapes through the door of the emporium and heads up the stairs towards Jabe's room yelling "No Jabe, no!" whereupon Jabe shoots Lady on the stairway. As Lady dies, the local sheriff and fire squad break through the front door, and seeing Val trying to get out of the emporium, open their water hoses full force in an ultimately successful attempt to push him back into the burning building, thus murdering him. Lady calls out for him while dying from her husband Jabe's gunshots.

In the final scene, Carol walks in the remains of the burnt-out emporium while another transient looks about and discovers Val's snakeskin jacket. Carol trades a gold ring for the jacket and offers a soliloquy on "the fugitive kind."

== Adaptations ==
In 1959, a screen adaptation starring Marlon Brando and Anna Magnani appeared under the title The Fugitive Kind; it was directed by Sidney Lumet, and flopped like the stage production. Orpheus Descending, a television adaptation of the Peter Hall stage production starring Vanessa Redgrave, was aired in 1990. The play was also adapted as a two-act opera by Bruce Saylor and J.D. McClatchy in 1994.

== See also ==
- Southern Gothic
