= Nederlander Theatre (Chicago) =

Theater in Chicago, Illinois

James M. Nederlander Theatre
- Nederlander Theater
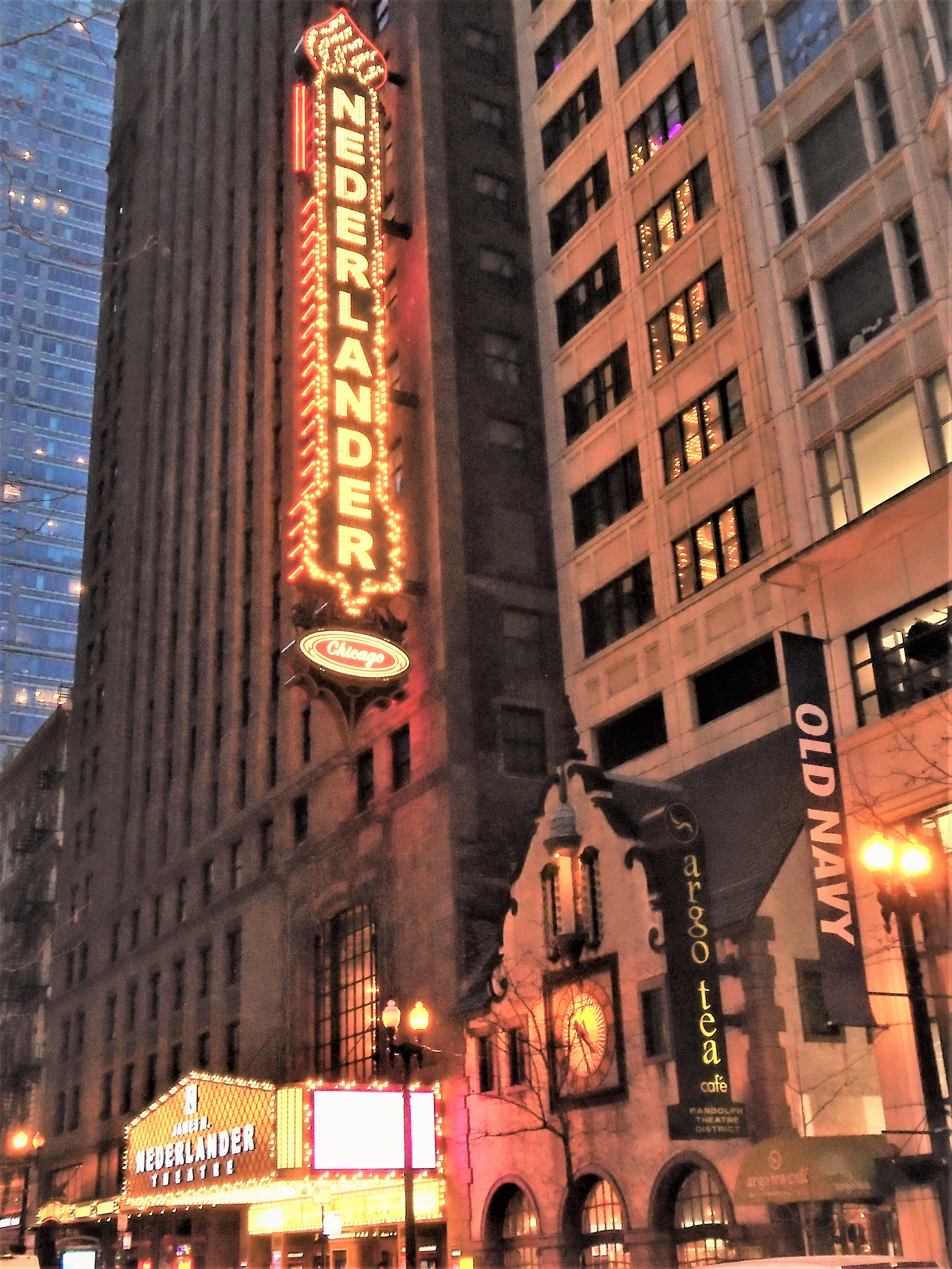
- The Nederlander Theatre in Chicago was listed on the National Register of Historic Places in 1978 as the New Masonic Building and Oriental Theater
- Interactive map of James M. Nederlander Theatre
- Former names: The Ford Center for the Performing Arts Oriental Theatre (1998–2019); Oriental Theatre (1926–1998)
- Address: 24 West Randolph Street
- Location: Chicago, Illinois
- Coordinates: 41°53′5″N 87°37′43″W
- Owner: Broadway In Chicago
- Capacity: 2,253
- Type: Theatre
- Public transit: Green Brown Pink Orange Purple at State/Lake; Red at Lake

Construction
- Opened: 1926
- Renovated: 1996 – 1998
- Architect: Rapp and Rapp

Website
- www.broadwayinchicago.com
- New Masonic Building and Oriental Theater
- U.S. National Register of Historic Places
- Location: 24 W Randolph Street; Chicago, Illinois
- Architectural style: Late Gothic Revival, Art Deco
- NRHP reference No.: 78003401
- Added to NRHP: September 26, 1978

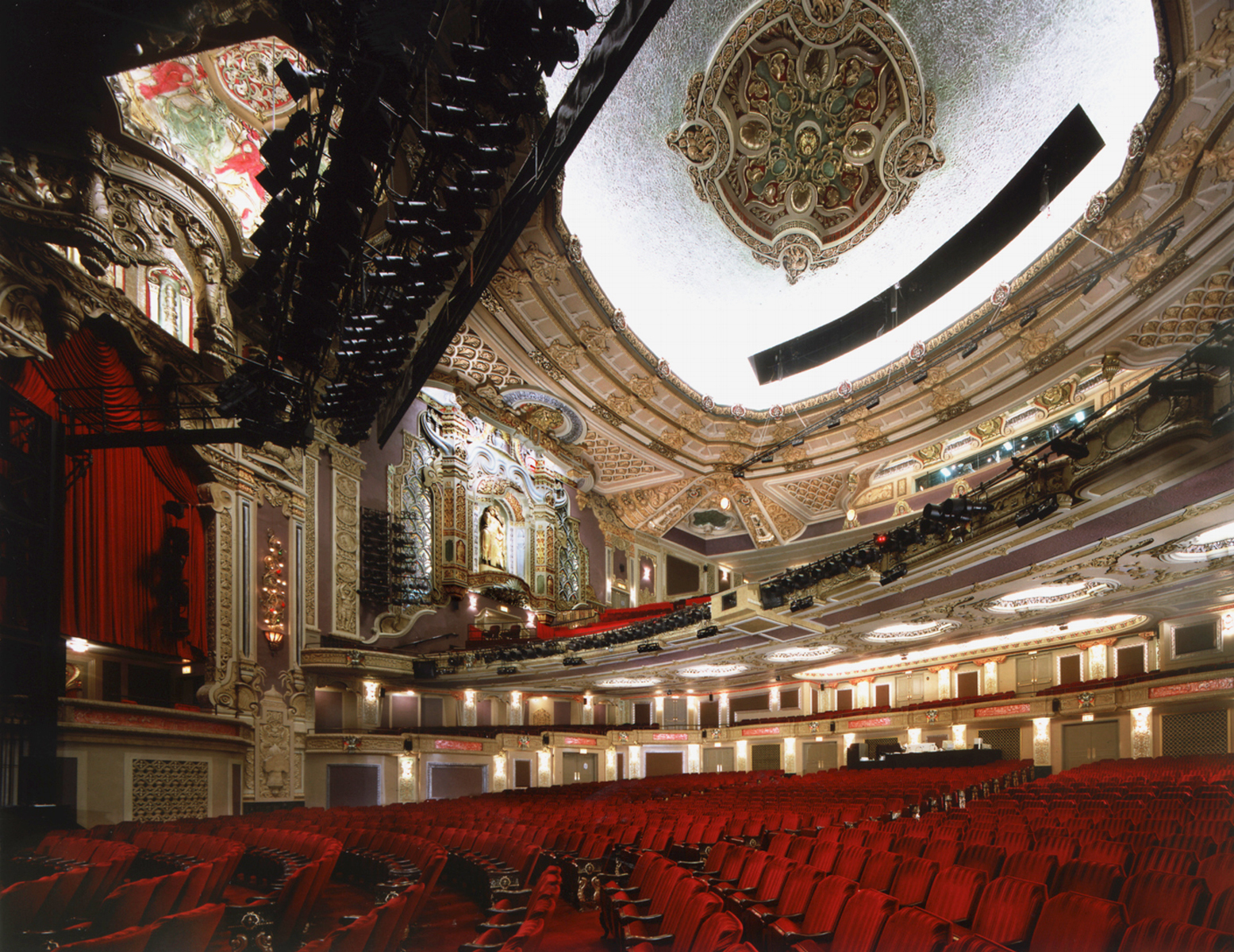
Auditorium of the James M. Nederlander Theatre

The James M. Nederlander Theatre is a theater located at 24 West Randolph Street in the Loop area of downtown Chicago, Illinois. It opened in 1926, named the Oriental Theater, as a deluxe movie palace and vaudeville venue. Today the Nederlander, which seats 2,253, presents live touring Broadway theater productions, and is operated by Broadway In Chicago.

The multi-story theater-house was constructed within what was the New Masonic office building and both the skyscraper and theater were listed in 1978 on the National Register of Historic Places as, New Masonic Building and Oriental Theater. The office building part is now a hotel. In 2019, the theater was re-named for theater impresario James M. Nederlander, of the Nederlander Organization.

== History ==
The Oriental had replaced an earlier theater venue on the site, which opened November 23, 1903 — the Iroquois Theatre, site of the Iroquois Theatre fire, the deadliest theatre fire and the deadliest single-building fire in U.S. history. After the fire's recorded death toll reached at least 600 fatalities, over double the death toll of The Great Chicago Fire, city officials closed all theaters in the city for inspection. Following the incident, the city enacted new laws that addressed aisleway and exit standards, scenery fireproofing, and occupancy limits.

=== Architecture ===
The exterior of the Iroquois was intact and the theater reopened nine months later as Hyde & Behman's Music Hall. The building later reopened as the Colonial Theater, which was demolished in 1925 to make way for the Oriental Theatre, which was later renamed the Nederlander Theatre in 2019.

The Oriental Theater opened in 1926 as one of many ornate movie palaces built in Chicago during the 1920s by the firm Rapp and Rapp. It featured ornate interiors, with gilded ornamental design in the lobby and main theater spaces.

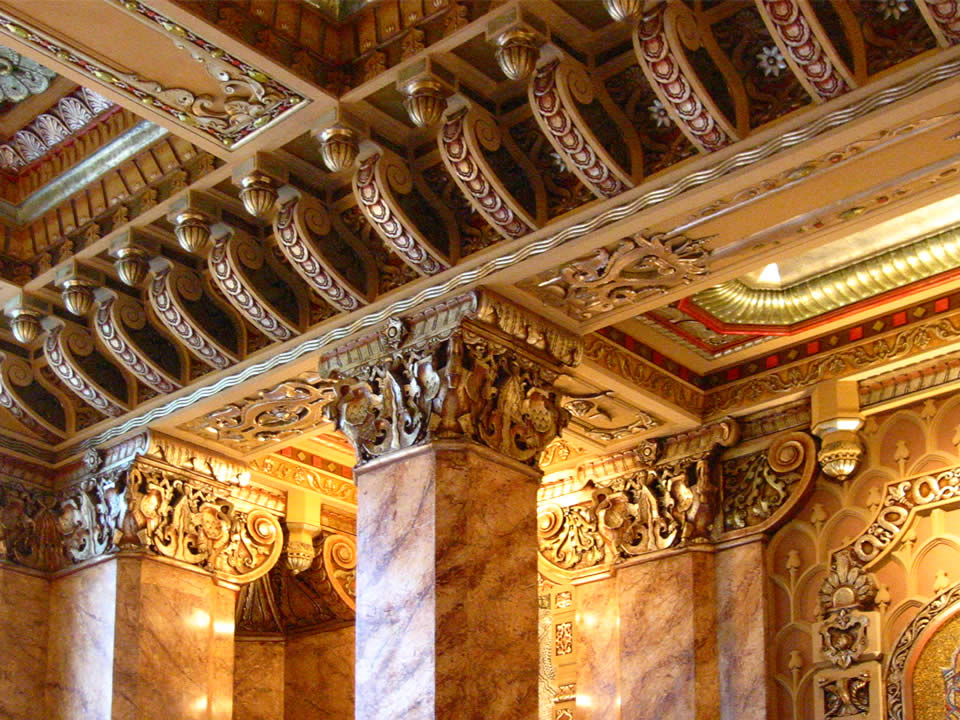
Detail of lobby columns

The architects of the Nederlander Theatre were George L. and Cornelius W. Rapp, who also designed the Palace and Chicago Theatres. The Nederlander Theatre features decor inspired by the architecture of India. The city's dominant theater chain, Balaban and Katz (a subsidiary of Paramount Pictures) operated the 3,250-seat venue.

=== General Use ===
The venue presented both movies and vaudeville acts during its early years, but by the 1930s it became predominantly a movie house, though live performances and concerts continued. Duke Ellington and his orchestra made frequent appearances at the Nederlander. Hal Pearl, Chicago's 'King of the Organ' gave concerts in the venue. Some of these were sponsored by the Chicago Area Theater Organ Enthusiasts (CATOE).

In October 1934, 12-year-old Frances Gumm and her sisters performed at the theater but received laughs when George Jessel would introduce them as The Gumm Sisters. At his urging, they changed their name to The Garland Sisters after his friend, Robert Garland, critic for The New York Times. Frances Garland would later change her first name, to become Judy Garland.

The theater is one of several houses operating in Chicago's revitalized Loop Theater District. According to Richard Christiansen of the Chicago Tribune, the reopening of the Oriental spurred the restoration of other theaters in The Loop. The district is also home to the Cadillac Palace Theatre, CIBC Theatre, the Goodman Theatre, and the Chicago Theatre. Randolph Street was traditionally the center of downtown Chicago's entertainment district until the 1970s when the area began to decline. The now–demolished United Artists Theatre, Woods Theatre, Garrick Theater (originally constructed as the Schiller Theater and Building), State-Lake Theatre, Erlanger and Roosevelt Theatre were located near the intersection of Randolph and State Streets. The Oriental continued to be a vital part of Chicago's theater district into the 1960s, but patronage declined in the 1970s as it survived by showing exploitation films.

It briefly stopped showing movies in late 1971 to focus on live entertainment, but the policy was reversed only weeks later. It did close as a movie house in 1981, and its lobby was refitted as a retail TV and radio store, while the theater remained vacant for more than a decade.

=== Restoration ===
In addition to movies, it occasionally showed live acts. The Oriental-Ford Center for the Arts reopened as a live theater venue in the 1990s.

On January 10, 1996, Canadian theatrical company Livent announced it acquired the property and would renovate the structure with an anticipated completion date of 1998. The city of Chicago pledged $13.5 million toward the restoration and Ford Motor Company entered into a sponsorship agreement with Livent for a reported $1 million annual fee.

During the restoration, architect Daniel P. Coffey created a design plan that would increase the theater's backstage area by gutting the adjacent Oliver Building while preserving one-third of its original steel structure, as well as the building's Dearborn façade and a portion of its alley façade.

The restored theater reopened October 18, 1998, with a reconfigured seating capacity of 2,253. The restored venue hosts touring Broadway shows, and premieres.

In November 1998, Livent filed for Chapter 11 bankruptcy protection in the U.S. and the Bankruptcy Court approved the sale of its assets to SFX Entertainment.

SFX's corporate successor, Live Nation, sold the venue to the Nederlander Organization in 2007.

In 2015, a developer purchased the adjacent 22-story office building with the intent of converting the space into 230 apartments. However, the plan quickly changed to a 198-room hotel which opened in 2017. During the renovation, workers on the fourteenth floor removed a false ceiling and discovered a long-forgotten Masonic meeting space. The developer preserved parts of the original architecture and renovated the space into a spiegeltent which opened in Spring 2019.

On November 13, 2018, Broadway In Chicago announced that the theater would be renamed to honor James M. Nederlander, founder of Broadway In Chicago, Broadway theater owner and producer, and champion of Chicago's Downtown Theater District, who died in 2016. The venue unveiled its newly renovated marquee, vertical blade sign and signage as the James M. Nederlander Theatre on February 8, 2019.

== Notable productions ==
=== Performers ===
Many other stars also performed at the Nederlander including: Ann-Margret, Sebastian Arcelus, George Benson, Stephanie J. Block, Fanny Brice, George Burns and Gracie Allen, Cab Calloway, Eddie Cantor, Gavin Creel, Bing Crosby, Danny Thomas, Alice Faye, Stepin Fetchit, Ella Fitzgerald, Ana Gasteyer, Montego Glover, Jean Harlow, Billie Holiday, Bob Hope, Al Jolson, Danny Kaye, Eartha Kitt, Jerry Lewis, Chico Marx, Hal Pearl, Penn & Teller, Frank Sinatra, The Three Stooges, Sophie Tucker, Sarah Vaughan and Henny Youngman.

=== Performances ===
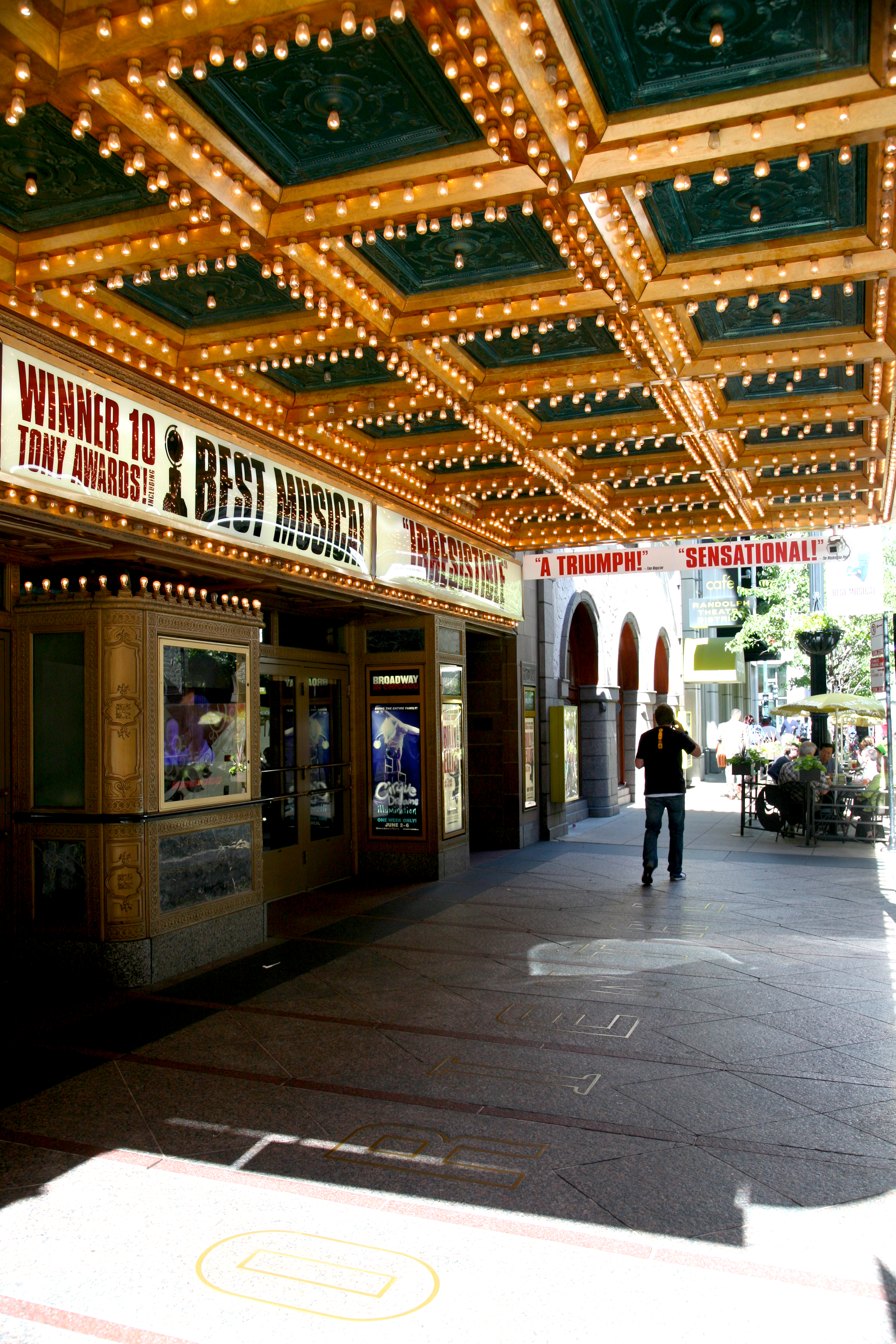
Detail beneath under the marquee during run of Billy Elliot the Musical (2010)

The theater re-opened in 1998 with the Chicago premiere of the musical Ragtime. From June 2005 through January 2009, the theater housed a sit-down production of Wicked, making it the most popular stage production in Chicago history. Wicked exceeded expectations, according to producer David Stone: "To be honest, we thought it would run eighteen months, then we'd spend a year in Los Angeles and six months in San Francisco."

The venue hosted the pre-Broadway run of The Addams Family, starring Nathan Lane and Bebe Neuwirth from November 13, 2009 through January 10, 2010, and a production of the 2009 Tony Award winner for Best Musical Billy Elliot starring Cesar Corrales as Billy from March 18 to November 28, 2010. The theatre also hosted the pre-Broadway runs of On Your Feet! June 2 through July 15, 2015 and SpongeBob SquarePants from June 7 to July 10, 2016.

The Cher Show, a so-called "bio-musical" of Cher's life and music, opened June 12, 2018, for a five-week run before moving to New York's Neil Simon Theatre that fall.

In March 2019, James L. Nederlander announced that a musical based on the songs of Britney Spears Once Upon a One More Time would premiere at the venue October 29 and run until December 1 when it would move to New York. In January, the Michael Jackson Estate and Columbia Live Stage had announced that MJ the Musical, a bio-musical of Michael Jackson would play during that period, but producers instead opted to premiere in New York.

The theatre reopened November 2, 2021, with previews of the pre-Broadway musical Paradise Square with an official opening on November 17. The run concluded December 5 after generally favorable reviews.

Harry Potter and the Cursed Child began its first North America tour at the theatre on September 10, 2024. Running until at least February 2025, the production condenses the original two-part play into one, lasting about two hours and 50 minutes.
