= Broadway in Tucson =

Musical events in Tucson, Arizona

Coordinates: 32°13′22.836″N 110°58′17.77″W

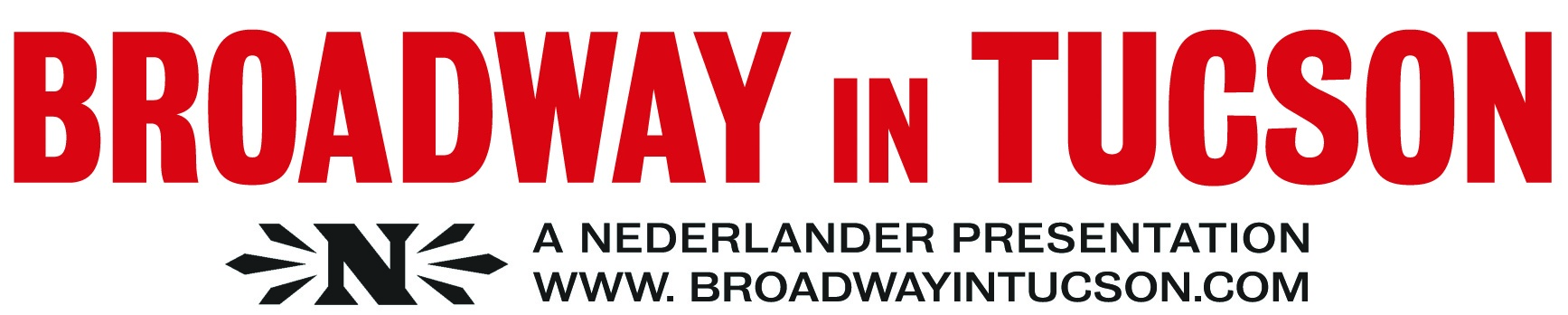
Broadway In Tucson logo

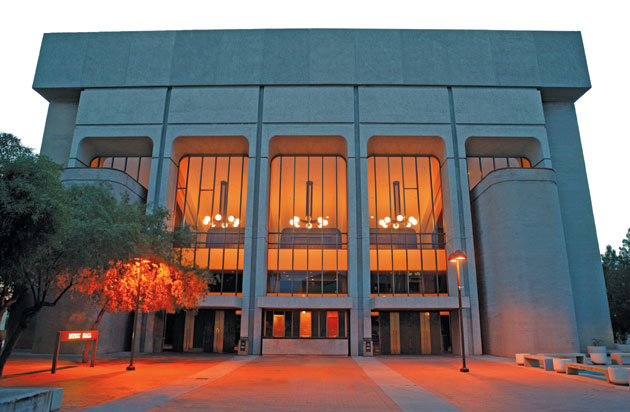
The Tucson Music Hall outside at dusk, where the performances are held.

Broadway in Tucson/A Nederlander Presentation is part of the nationally recognized Nederlander Producing Company of America. The Nederlander organization was awarded a contract by the City of Tucson in 2003 to present a series of Broadway musicals and special events downtown at the Tucson Music Hall and Leo Rich Theater, all of which are part of the Tucson Convention Center. Since 2003 Broadway In Tucson has been responsible for bringing over 25 Broadway shows to downtown Tucson.

February 18, 2010 marked the press release stating that Broadway in Tucson will be bringing the smash Broadway hit Wicked to Tucson, as a part of its 2010–2011 season. For the first time ever, a Broadway in Tucson show will be held at University of Arizona's Centennial Hall. This presentation of Wicked is co-sponsored by UApresents; subsequently this represents the first partnership between the two organizations.

== Past Seasons ==
=== 2004-2005 ===
- Kenny Loggins
- John Fogerty
- Movin' Out (musical)
- Peter Pan (1954 musical)
- Chicago (musical)
- Robert Dubac's The Male Intellect
- Queensrÿche
- B.B. King
- Thoroughly Modern Millie (musical)

=== 2005-2006 ===
- Jerry Seinfeld
- Dora the Explorer
- The Black Crowes
- Little Women
- Annie
- Barenaked Ladies
- Linda Eder
- Evita
- Doctor Dolittle
- Bob Dylan
- Les Misérables
- The Lion King

=== 2006-2007 ===
- The Ten Tenors
- Juan Gabriel
- All American Rejects, Motion Picture Soundtrack, The Format, Gym Class Heroes
- All Shook Up
- Altar Boyz
- Rent (musical)
- Dirty Rotten Scoundrels (musical)
- Damien Rice
- Who's Afraid of Virginia Woolf?
- Morrissey
- Kathy Griffin

=== 2007-2008 ===
- A staged version of Go, Diego, Go!
- Avenue Q
- Defending the Caveman
- The Rat Pack - Live at the Sands
- The Ten Tenors
- The 25th Annual Putnam County Spelling Bee
- Cats

=== 2008-2009 ===
- Rain-A Tribute to The Beatles
- Jesus Christ Superstar
- A Bronx Tale (play)
- Grease (musical)
- Mamma Mia!
- Tuna Does Vegas

=== 2009-2010 ===
- John Legend (Special Nederlander Concerts Event)
- Monty Python's Spamalot
- The Ten Tenors Holiday Concert
- Legally Blonde The Musical
- Fiddler on the Roof

=== 2010-2011 ===
- Jerry Seinfeld
- The Color Purple
- Disney's Beauty and the Beast
- Wicked
- Spring Awakening
- Burn the Floor

=== 2011-2012 ===
- West Side Story
- Shrek The Musical
- Rock of Ages
- In the Heights
- Mary Poppins

=== 2012-2013 ===
- Stomp
- Anything Goes
- Carol Burnett
- Memphis
- Wicked
- Blue Man Group
- Million Dollar Quartet

=== 2013-2014 ===
- Sister Act
- American Idiot
- Mamma Mia!
- The Australian Bee Gees Show
- The Wizard of Oz
- I Love Lucy: Live on Stage
- Jersey Boys

=== 2014-2015 ===
- Flashdance the Musical
- Disney's Beauty and the Beast
- Joseph and the Amazing Technicolor Dreamcoat
- Guys and Dolls
- Alton Brown Live
- Once
- Newsies

=== 2015-2016 ===
- Annie
- The Phantom of the Opera
- Mythbusters: Jamie and Adam Unleashed
- Riverdance
- The Book of Mormon
- Star Trek: The Ultimate Voyage
- 42nd Street
- Chicago

=== 2016-2017 ===
- Cabaret
- Mamma Mia!
- The Sound of Music
- Dirty Dancing
- Motown: The Musical
- Kinky Boots
- Brain Candy Live!
- The Bodyguard

=== 2017-2018 ===
- Disney's The Little Mermaid
- Beautiful: The Carole King Musical
- Rent
- Rodgers + Hammerstein's Cinderella
- Stomp
- The King and I
- The Book of Mormon
- Rain: A Tribute to the Beatles
- Finding Neverland

=== 2018-2019 ===
- Les Misérables
- On Your Feet!
- Waitress
- Something Rotten!
- Fiddler on the Roof
- Cats
- The Illusionists

=== 2019-2020 ===
- Hello, Dolly!
- Anastasia
- Jesus Christ Superstar
- The Play That Goes Wrong
- A Bronx Tale
- Come from Away
- The Book of Mormon
- Jersey Boys

=== 2020-2021 ===
- Hamilton
