= Broadway Direct =

American ticket seller and news website

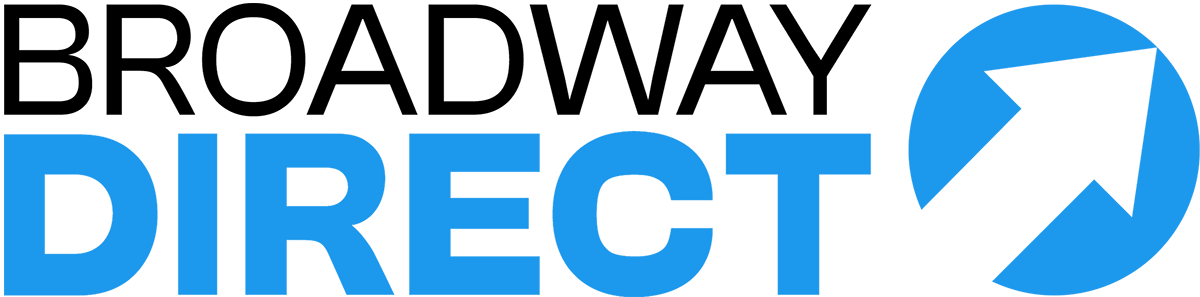
- Company type: Private
- Industry: Tickets Sales; Entertainment Media
- Founded: 2011; 15 years ago
- Headquarters: New York City, United States
- Area served: United States
- Owner: Nederlander Organization
- Website: broadwaydirect.com

Broadway Direct is an American ticket seller and operator of a news website for Broadway theatre. It was established in 2011 and is owned by the Nederlander Organization.

== History ==
Broadway Direct was established in 2011 by its current owner, the Nederlander Organization, one of the largest theatre owners and operators in the United States.

When Broadway Direct launched, the editor of news was James Sims. The rest of the organization was broken into two teams: New York and National. The New York team was composed of members of Nederlander Producing Company of America, and the National team was composed of theater leaders across the United States.

In 2022, Broadway Direct was taken to court by the U.S. Justice Department for allegedly violating the Immigration and Nationality Act. After learning that Broadway Direct may have posted a job advertisement limiting its hiring for a position to only U.S. citizen applicants, the Justice Department's investigation determined that Broadway Direct had posted at least one job advertisement with unlawful citizenship status restrictions. A settlement agreement between the two parties was announced in January 2023. The settlement mandated that Nederlander would "pay a civil penalty to the United States, train staff on the INA’s anti-discrimination provision, review and revise their employment policies, and be subject to departmental monitoring for a two-year period."

Also in 2023, The Lion King, on Broadway at the Minskoff Theatre, switched official ticket vendors from Ticketmaster to Broadway Direct. The Nederlander Organization, which owns Broadway Direct, also owns the Minskoff Theatre. Ticketmaster had previously handled ticket sales for the Lion King for two decades, handpicking The Lion King to be the first Broadway production to use online ticketing.

== Services ==
It provides Broadway-related news and ticket sales for theatrical productions in New York City. It publishes articles covering Broadway shows, casting announcements, and industry developments, and offers ticketing services connected to Broadway theatres operated by the Nederlander Organization.

Broadway Direct operates ticket lotteries for some, but not all, Broadway productions. Some long-standing shows with digital lotteries hosted by Broadway Direct include Aladdin, MJ, SIX, The Lion King, and Wicked. Other Broadway lotteries are run by Luckyseat, Telecharge, TodayTix, or by the individual productions.

Broadway Direct is officially partnered with Capital One, and offers a limited amount of exclusive seats to cardholders.
