= Drury Lane Theatre (Illinois) =

Group of five metropolitan Chicago dinner theatre venues

The Drury Lane Theatres were a group of five theatres in the Chicago metropolitan area founded by Tony DeSantis. The playhouses were named after the historic Theatre Royal Drury Lane, built in London in the 17th century. The five locations all provided affordable dinner theatre that was appropriate for families. Two have since closed, two others were later sold and operate under new names, and one as of 2007 still operated as a Drury Lane Theatre.

DeSantis opened the Martinique Restaurant in Evergreen Park and began producing plays in 1949 in a tent adjacent to the restaurant to attract customers. The enterprise was successful, prompting him to build his first theatre.

- Drury Lane Evergreen Park was DeSantis's first theatre in the Chicago area. It opened in 1958 and was a local entertainment landmark for 45 years before closing in 2003.
- Drury Lane Oakbrook Terrace opened in 1984, and is located at the intersection of Kingery Highway, Butterfield Road, and Illinois Route 38 (Roosevelt Road) in Oakbrook Terrace. It continues to present an annual season of five shows.
- The original Drury Lane Water Tower Place opened in 1976, but closed in 1983. A new, $7 million version opened on May 18, 2004. In 2010, this was taken over by the Nederlander Organization-owned Broadway In Chicago production company and renamed the Broadway Playhouse at Water Tower Place.
- Drury Lane North began operations in 1976, but was soon sold to the Marriott Lincolnshire Resort and became the Marriott Theatre.
- Drury Lane East (at McCormick Place) also opened in the 1970s, but failed within a year of its opening.

== See also ==
- List of dinner theaters
