= Centennial Hall (Tucson, Arizona) =

Concert venue

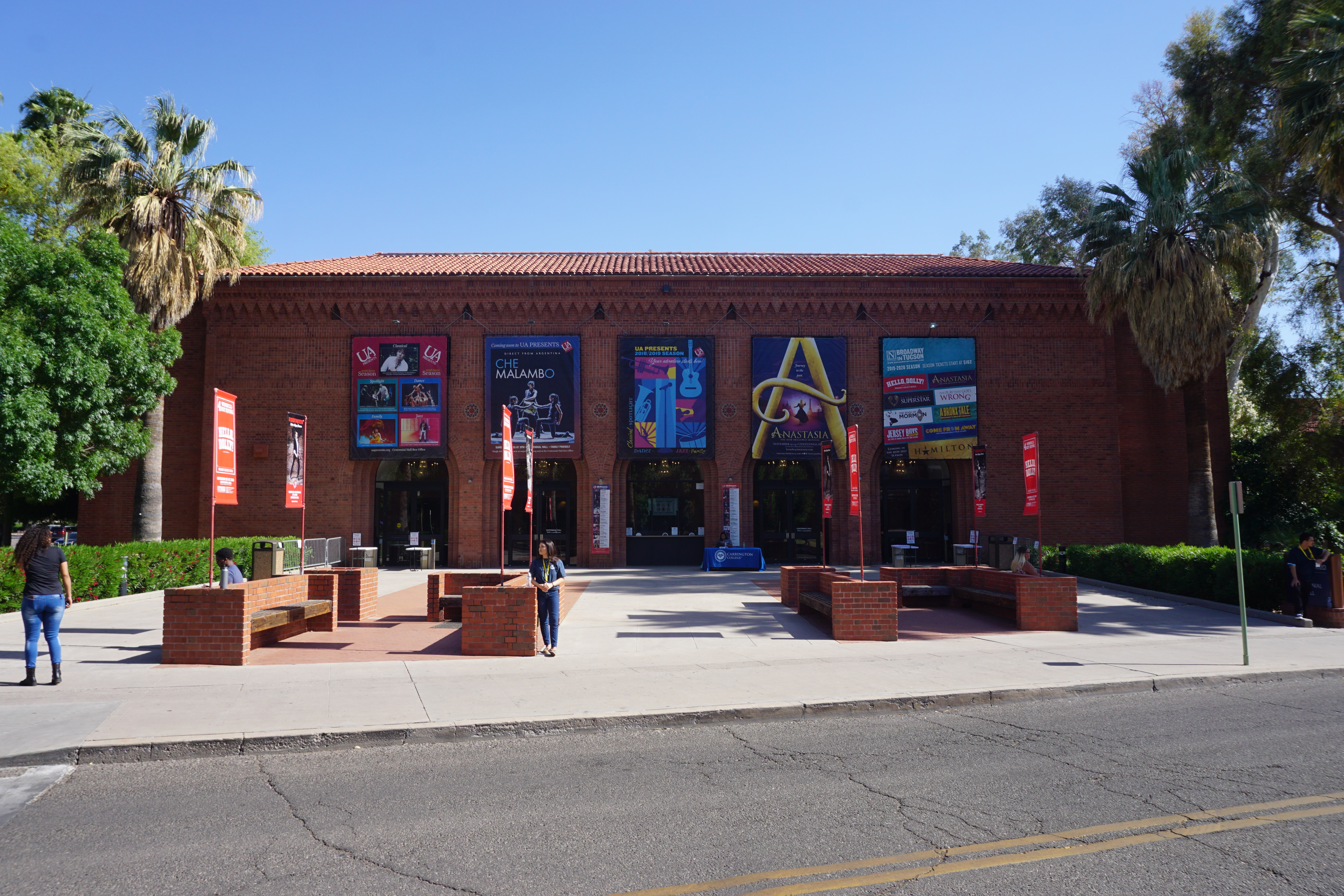
- Interactive map of Centennial Hall
- Address: 1020 East University Boulevard; Tucson, Arizona; United States
- Coordinates: 32.23149°N 110.95543°W
- Owner: University of Arizona
- Operator: UApresents
- Capacity: 2,500

Construction
- Opened: April 22, 1937
- Architect: Roy Place

Website
- uapresents.org/centennial-hall

Centennial Hall is located on the campus of the University of Arizona, in Tucson, and was the campus auditorium, designed by campus architect Roy Place and using the signature red brick that is a part of almost all UA buildings. The auditorium opened in 1937 and presented musical programs, as well as stage plays, to the student community as well as to the general public. The auditorium was also used as a general lecture hall.

From 1947 to 1984, the auditorium hosted the Tucson Sunday Evening Forum. Many prominent American figures appeared at the Forum, including Dr. Martin Luther King Jr., Eleanor Roosevelt, John F. Kennedy, Jackie Robinson, and Walter Cronkite.

The facility was extensively renovated in 1985 at a cost of over $4 million, and was renamed to honor the university's 100th anniversary. The theatre is operated by UApresents, the University of Arizona's professional performing arts component. UApresents brings the world's finest theatre, dance, spoken word, classical, jazz and world music to Southern Arizona. It also continues to host university lectures as well.

In 2010, the Broadway in Tucson series announced it would bring the smash Broadway hit Wicked to Tucson. This was the first time a Broadway in Tucson show played at Centennial Hall. The presentation of Wicked was co-sponsored by UApresents; subsequently this represented the first partnership between the two organizations.

== See also ==
- Broadway in Tucson
