= Cadillac Palace Theatre =

Theater in Chicago, Illinois

Coordinates: 41°53′2″N 87°37′57″W

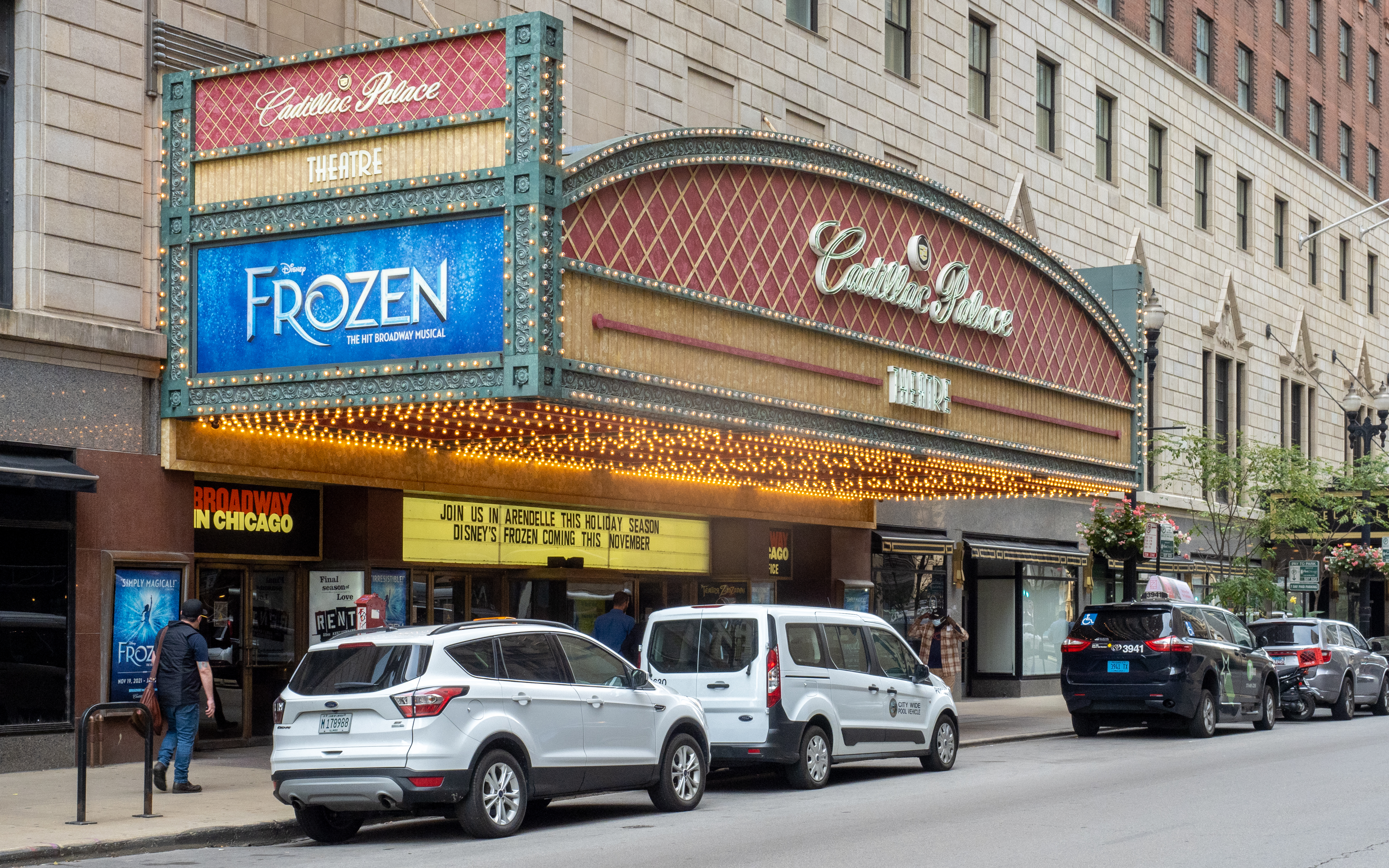
- Marquee and Entrance (2021)
- Interactive map of Cadillac Palace Theatre
- Former names: New Palace Theatre (1926–1931); RKO Palace Theatre (1931–1953); Eitel's Palace Theatre (1953–1972); Bismarck Theatre (1984–1999)
- Address: 151 W Randolph St. Chicago, IL 60601-3108
- Location: Chicago Loop
- Owner: Van Kampen Family
- Operator: Nederlander Organization
- Capacity: 2,344
- Production: Les Miserables (2025)

Construction
- Opened: October 4, 1926
- Renovated: 1972, 1984, 1999
- Closed: 1972-84
- Cost: $12 million ($231 million in 2025 dollars) $20 million (1999 renovations) ($39.5 million in 2025 dollars)
- Architect: Rapp and Rapp

Website
- Venue Website

The Cadillac Palace Theatre is a theater in the Loop community area of Chicago, Illinois, United States. Operated by Broadway In Chicago of the Nederlander Organization, it seats 2,344 and is located at 151 West Randolph Street.

Opened in 1926 as the New Palace Theatre and designed largely in the French Baroque style, it is connected to the historic Eitel Brothers' Bismarck Hotel (Allegro Royal). It was known as the RKO Palace Theatre from 1931 to 1953, as the Eitel's Palace Theatre from 1953 to 1972, and as the Bismarck Theatre from 1984 to 1999. The automobile manufacturer Cadillac has held the naming rights since 1999.

== History ==
The theater opened in 1926 as the New Palace Theatre with Roger Wolfe Kahn and his Orchestra topping the bill. It was built at a cost of $12 million as part of the Eitel Block Project. In the 1960s, the theater was renamed the Bismarck Theatre and later turned into a rock venue. In 1999, it was renovated and renamed the Cadillac Palace Theatre after Cadillac purchased naming rights. It currently has a maximum capacity of 2,344 people. Since this reopening, it has been home to many pre-broadway hits. Broadway In Chicago has allowed for more Broadway hits to tour through Chicago, causing a great economic impact on the city of Chicago.

== Architecture ==
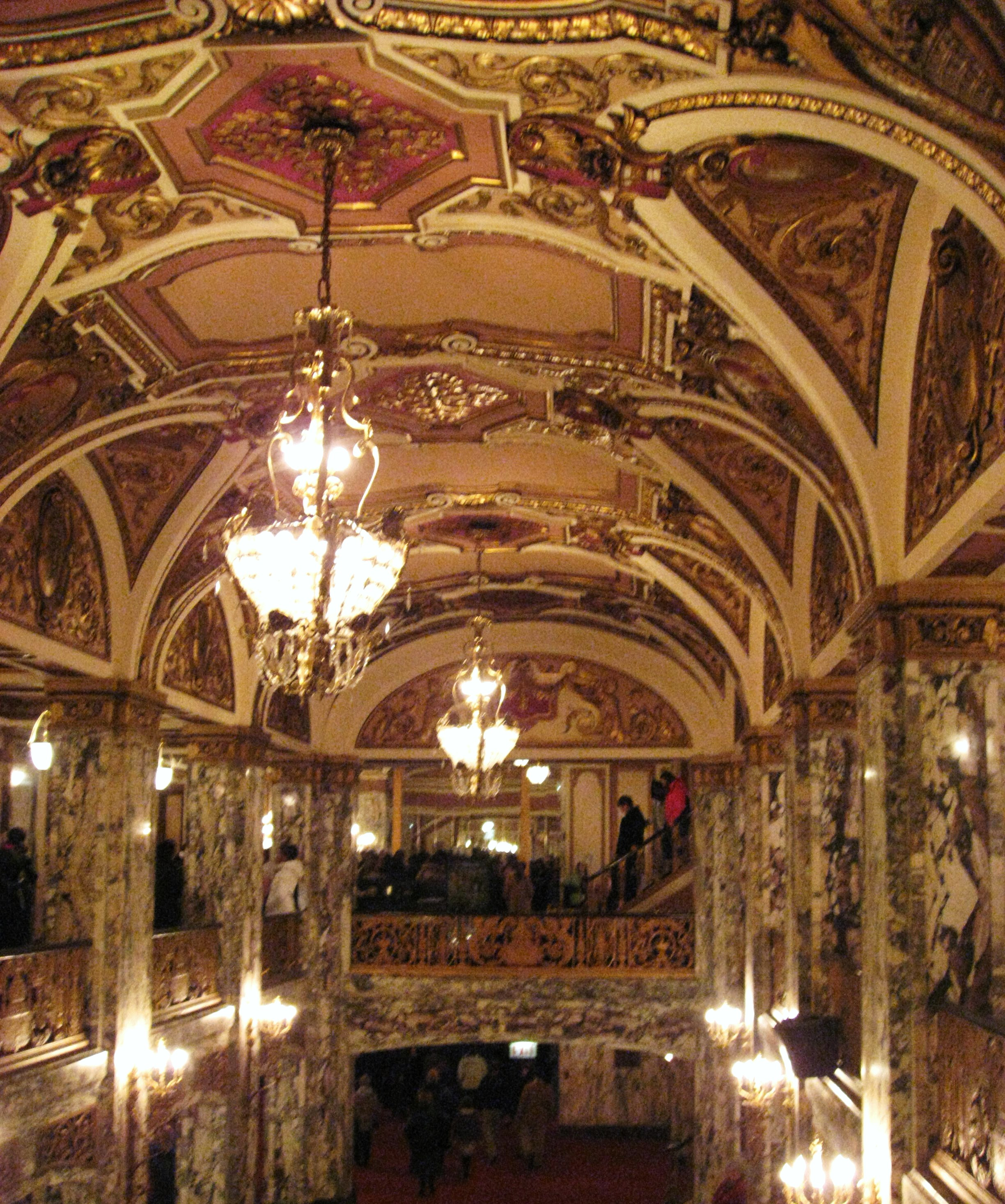
The French Baroque style of the interior.

The Rapp Brothers, George and Cornelius, were responsible for the design of the Cadillac Palace Theatre. The two men were also the architects behind the Nederlander Theatre and the Chicago Theatre, as well as dozens of other theaters around the country. Their inspiration for the look and feel of the Palace Theatre came from the Fontainebleau and the Palace of Versailles, both found in France. The interior includes huge decorative mirrors, breche violet and white marble. The walls inside are adorned with gold leafing and wood decorations, as well as a series of complex arches and detailed brass ornamentation.

=== Restoration ===
During World War II the United States government went around to most theaters and confiscated all the brass which it recycled for war materials. At the time, the owners of the Palace Theatre painted all the brass in the theater white, so that when the government came in, they were tricked into thinking the theater contained no brass. The brass was left this way and generally forgotten until the $2.5 million renovation in 1999, when the paint was removed and the rare brass ornamentation was rediscovered and restored to its original condition. After the restoration, it was reopened under its new name, the Cadillac Palace Theatre.

== General interest ==
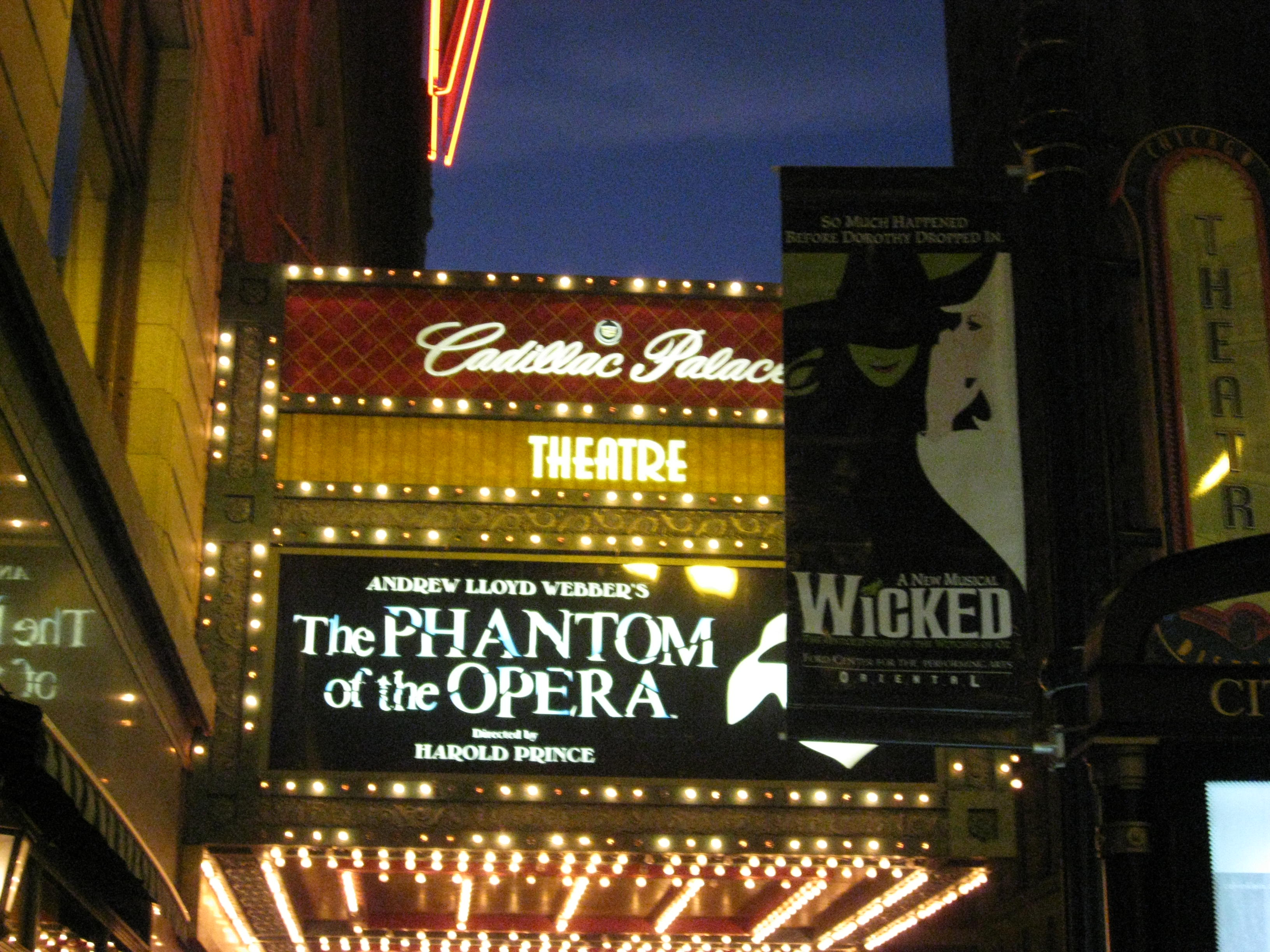
The theater presented The Phantom of the Opera in the 2007-2008 season.

The theater opened as part of vaudeville's Orpheum Circuit. As part of the Orpheum Circuit, the theater presented such stars as Jimmy Durante, Mae West, Jack Benny, Sophie Tucker, and Bob Hope. After the loss of interest in vaudeville, the theater was converted into a movie palace in 1931.

== Notable productions ==
The Cadillac Palace became home to pre-Broadway tours and world premieres with the opening of Elton John and Tim Rice's Aida in the autumn of 1999. This was the beginning of many Broadway-caliber shows to pass through the Cadillac Palace. Mel Brooks's The Producers premiered in Chicago starring Nathan Lane and Matthew Broderick in February 2001. In October 2006 The Pirate Queen made its premiere. Oprah Winfrey presents The Color Purple sat down for its long-run from April to September 2007. In March 2009, the national tour of Mary Poppins began its premier engagement at the Cadillac Palace. Shrek The Musical launched its national tour there from July 13-September 5, 2010. Beginning December 1, 2010, Wicked played a limited return engagement on its first national tour, playing through January 23, 2011.
