= Robert Nederlander =

American attorney and businessman (born 1933)

- Born: Robert Elliot Nederlander; April 10, 1933 (age 93); Detroit, Michigan, U.S.
- Education: University of Michigan (BA, JD)
- Occupations: Live theater owner and operator
- Known for: President of the Nederlander Organization; Minority owner of the New York Yankees
- Spouses: Caren Elaine Berman (m. 1952; div. 1985) Gladys Nederlander (m. 1988; died 2008)
- Children: 2
- Parent(s): Sarah Applebaum; David T. Nederlander
- Family: James M. Nederlander (brother); Joseph Z. Nederlander (brother); James L. Nederlander (nephew)

Robert Elliot Nederlander Sr. (born April 10, 1933) is an American attorney and businessman who served as the president of the Nederlander Organization, which has been involved in the live theatre industry since the early 20th century. He is also the former managing general partner of the New York Yankees. He served in this role during the suspension of George Steinbrenner.

== Early life and education ==
Nederlander was born on April 10, 1933, to a Jewish family in Detroit, Michigan, the youngest of six children born to Sarah (née Applebaum) and David T. "D.T." Nederlander. His father bought his first live theater in 1905, the Fisher Theater in Detroit and founded the family company, the Nederlander Organization. He has four brothers: Harry, Jimmy, Fred, and Joseph; and one sister, Frances. Nederlander graduated from the University of Michigan, where he played on the school's tennis team, and earned a J.D. from the University of Michigan Law School after which he established a law firm in Detroit.

== Career ==
After his father's death in the 1960s, the Nederlander brothers continued to purchase theaters expanding nationally with Jimmy moving to New York City, Harry to San Francisco, and Joey remaining in Detroit. Their largest rivals were the Shubert family, the owners of the largest number of Broadway theatres in New York City. In 1973, Nederlander and his brothers joined with George Steinbrenner as limited partners when Steinbrenner purchased the New York Yankees of Major League Baseball. In 1981, he moved to New York City, the heart of the live theater industry in the United States to serve as president of the Nederlander Organization while his brother Jimmy served as the frontman for the company. He was also named the chairman and chief executive officer of the Allis-Chalmers Manufacturing Company in 1989. He resigned from the role in 1993 to focus on other business ventures.

In 1990, when Steinbrenner was banned from the Yankees for his association with a known gambler (whom he had hired to find dirt on Dave Winfield), Nederlander became the Yankees' managing general partner (Steinbrenner's oldest son, Hank, had declined the position). Nederlander resigned from the role, effective December 31, 1991, and was succeeded by Joe Molloy.

== Personal life ==
Nederlander was married and divorced twice to his first wife, psychologist Caren Elaine Berman. They had two sons:

- Eric Nederlander, a theatrical producer, who was briefly married to cookbook author Nina Danielle Sklar (who later married comedian Jerry Seinfeld). In 2004, he married Dr. Lindsey Kupferman in a ceremony at the Breakers Hotel in Palm Beach, Florida. They divorced in 2007.
- Robert Nederlander Jr., the president of Interactive Concepts Unlimited, a multimedia development company. In 1994, he married Suzanne Beth Meirowitz, a producer for CBS Evening News, in a ceremony in New York City.

Nederlander's second wife, theater and television producer Gladys Nederlander, died in 2008 at the age of 83.
