= Joseph Z. Nederlander =

American businessman (1927–2021)

- Born: Joseph Zachary Nederlander; June 1, 1927; Detroit, Michigan
- Died: May 1, 2021 (aged 93); Bloomfield Township, Michigan
- Occupations: Live theater owner and operator
- Known for: Executive VP of the Nederlander Organization
- Spouses: Ricki Rose (m. 1960; div. 1973) Laurie (m. 1975; div. 1988) Carol Jacoby (m. 2000)
- Children: 2
- Family: James M. Nederlander (brother); Robert Nederlander (brother); Frederick Nederlander (brother); Harry Nederlander (brother); James L. Nederlander(nephew)

Joseph Zachary Nederlander (June 1, 1927 – May 1, 2021) was an American theater owner and operator who served as the executive vice president of the Nederlander Organization, one of the largest live theater owners and producers in the United States.

== Early life and education ==
Nederlander was born to a Jewish family in Detroit, Michigan, on June 1, 1927. He was one of six children of Sarah (née Applebaum) and David T. "D.T." Nederlander. His father's first venture into live theatre came in 1912, when he signed a 99-year lease on the old Opera House at Campus Martius in Detroit and founded the family company, the Nederlander Organization. He has four brothers: James, Harry, Robert, and Fred; and one sister, Frances.

Nederlander attended Pontiac High School in Pontiac, Michigan. He served in the Navy before returning home in 1947 and enrolled at Wayne State University for one semester. After he dropped out of college, he joined the family's theatre business.

== Career ==
Nederlander's father bought the Orpheum Theatre on Lafayette in 1940 with the Shubert Organization. They renamed the theatre the Shubert-Lafayette Theatre (demolished in 1964). Nederlander, now working in all aspects of the business from the box office to sweeping the floors, with his father and brother James, also purchased the Riviera Theatre (demolished in 1996) on West Grand River.

Nederlander was instrumental in the complete reconfiguration of the Fisher Theatre in 1961 with his father, D.T. and brother, James. The 3,500-seat movie house built by the Fisher brothers would be pared down to a state-of-the-art 2,200-seat legitimate live theatre. It quickly became a premier venue not only in Detroit, but across the country. Not long after opening, it had the largest season-ticket subscription in the country, at 55,000.

As the family business expanded and James moved to New York to continue to buy theatres and produce Broadway shows, Nederlander stayed behind to run operations in Detroit. The Nederlander Organization controlled the Fisher Theatre, Shubert Theatre, and Grand Riviera Theater. Nederlander was instrumental in the opening of the Pine Knob Music Theatre (now known as DTE Energy Music Theatre) in the 1970s.

The Nederlander Organization controls nine Broadway theaters and is the second-largest of the three companies that dominate Broadway, after the Shubert Organization (which owns 16 theaters) and ahead of Jujamcyn (which owns five). On a global scale, the Nederlander Organization is larger, with an additional 15 theaters nationwide. They are the only one of the three that is still run by its owners.

Nederlander produced the revival of Stop the World – I Want to Get Off (1978), Into the Light (1986), and Side Show (1997).

== Personal life ==
Nederlander was married three times. His nephew, James L. Nederlander, is the current president of the Nederlander Organization in New York.

Nederlander died on May 1, 2021. He was 93, and suffered from Parkinson's disease in the years leading up to his death.

== Theatre ==
Year	Title	Type	Role	Theatre
1969	Indians	Original	Theatre Owner/Operator	Brooks Atkinson Theatre
1970	Paris Is Out!	Original	Theatre Owner/Operator	Brooks Atkinson Theatre
1973	Seesaw	Original	Theatre Owner/Operator	Uris Theatre
1973	Gigi	Original	Theatre Owner/Operator	Uris Theatre
1974	Sammy	Original	Theatre Owner/Operator	Uris Theatre
1974	Anthony Newley / Henry Mancini	Original	Theatre Owner/Operator	Uris Theatre
1975	Treemonisha	Original	Theatre Owner/Operator	Uris Theatre
1976	The Mikado	Revival	Theatre Owner/Operator	Uris Theatre
1976	The Pirates of Penzance	Revival	Theatre Owner/Operator	Uris Theatre
1976	H.M.S. Pinafore	Revival	Theatre Owner/Operator	Uris Theatre
1976	Porgy and Bess	Revival	Theatre Owner/Operator	Uris Theatre
1976	Bing Crosby on Broadway	Original	Theatre Owner/Operator	Uris Theatre
1977	Nureyev	Original	Theatre Owner/Operator	Uris Theatre
1977	Béjart: Ballet of the Twentieth Century	Original	Theatre Owner/Operator	Uris Theatre
1977	The King and I	Revival	Theatre Owner/Operator	Uris Theatre
1978	Stop the World - I Want to Get Off	Revival	Producer	New York State Theatre
1986	Sweet Charity	Revival	Theatre Owner/Operator	Minskoff Theatre
1986	Into the Light	Original	Producer	Neil Simon Theatre
1997	Side Show	Original	Producer	Richard Rodgers Theatre

== Awards and nominations ==
Year	Award	Category	Work	Result
1998	Tony Award	Best Musical	Side Show	Nominated
1998	Drama League Award	Distinguished Production of a Musical	Side Show	Nominated

== See also ==
- Detroit Theatre District
