= Gladys Nederlander =

Theater and television producer (1925-2008)

- Born: Gladys Lenore Blum; November 14, 1925; New York City, New York, U.S.
- Died: August 18, 2008 (aged 82); New York City, New York, U.S.
- Occupation(s): Live theater and television producer
- Spouses: Fred Stryker (m. 1945; div. 1955) Milton Rackmil (m. 1963; div. 1973) Robert Nederlander (m. 1988)
- Children: 2

Gladys Nederlander (November 14, 1925 – August 18, 2008) was an American theater and television producer.

== Early life ==
Nederlander was born Gladys Lenore Blum in New York City, to Gaston Blum, an immigrant from England, and Sherry, an immigrant from Romania. Her father worked in advertising. Her family moved to Chicago when she was a child and after the death of her father, her mother moved the family to southern California. Her first job was working on the staff of the 1940s radio game show Queen for a Day. In the early 1960s, after two children and a divorce from songwriter Fred Stryker, she ran a clothing store Palm Springs, California and also worked at a local radio station interviewing celebrities.

== Career ==
In 1963, after marrying the founder of Decca Records and president of Universal Pictures, Milton Rackmil, she worked with American theatrical producer Roger L. Stevens at the Kennedy Center for the Performing Arts (which Stevens founded). Between 1976 and 1993 she produced nine Broadway shows including the 1977 adaption of Caesar and Cleopatra with Rex Harrison and Elizabeth Ashley; the 1980 revival of West Side Story written by Stephen Sondheim, Arthur Laurents and Leonard Bernstein; the 1992 play, Death and the Maiden written by Chilean playwright Ariel Dorfman and starring Gene Hackman, Glenn Close, and Richard Dreyfus; and the 1993 musical adaptation of Neil Simon's Goodbye Girl with Martin Short and Bernadette Peters.

In 1982, she became executive producer for Nederlander Television and Film Productions which produced made-for-TV movies including A Case of Libel with Edward Asner and Daniel J. Travanti and Intimate Strangers starring Stacy Keach. She also produced a series of 14 one-act plays by for the Arts & Entertainment Network. After her third marriage, she continued to produce under her former married name, Gladys Rackmil, in partnership with her third husband Robert Nederlander and the Kennedy Center for the Performing Arts. In 1990, she produced the film Orpheus Descending starring Vanessa Redgrave and directed by Peter Hall based on a Tennessee Williams' play.

== Personal life ==
Nederlander was married three times:

- In 1945, she married songwriter Fred Stryker. They divorced in 1955. They had two children: Steven Stryker and Teri Ann Stryker.
- In 1963, she married the co-founder of Decca Records and the president of Universal Pictures, Milton Rackmil (the former husband of American actress and singer Vivian Blaine). They divorced in 1973.
- Her third husband was theater owner and producer Robert E. Nederlander.
