= James M. Nederlander =

American theater producer

- Born: March 31, 1922; Detroit, Michigan, US
- Died: July 25, 2016 (aged 94); New York City, US
- Occupations: Live theater owner and operator
- Known for: Chairman of the Nederlander Organization
- Spouse(s): Barbara Smith (divorced); Charlene Saunders
- Children: James L. Nederlander
- Family: Robert Nederlander (brother); Joseph Z. Nederlander (brother)

James M. Nederlander (March 31, 1922 – July 25, 2016) was an American theatrical producer who served as chairman of the Nederlander Organization, one of the largest operators of live theaters and music venues in the United States. He was a 10-time Tony Award winner and was nominated for 37 Tony Awards.

== Early life and education ==
Nederlander was born in Detroit to a Jewish family, one of six children of Sarah (née Applebaum) and David T. "D.T." Nederlander. His father bought his first live theater in 1905, the Fisher Theater in Detroit (which is no longer owned by the family) and founded the family company, the Nederlander Organization. He has four brothers: Harry, Robert, Fred, and Joseph; and one sister, Frances.

== Career ==
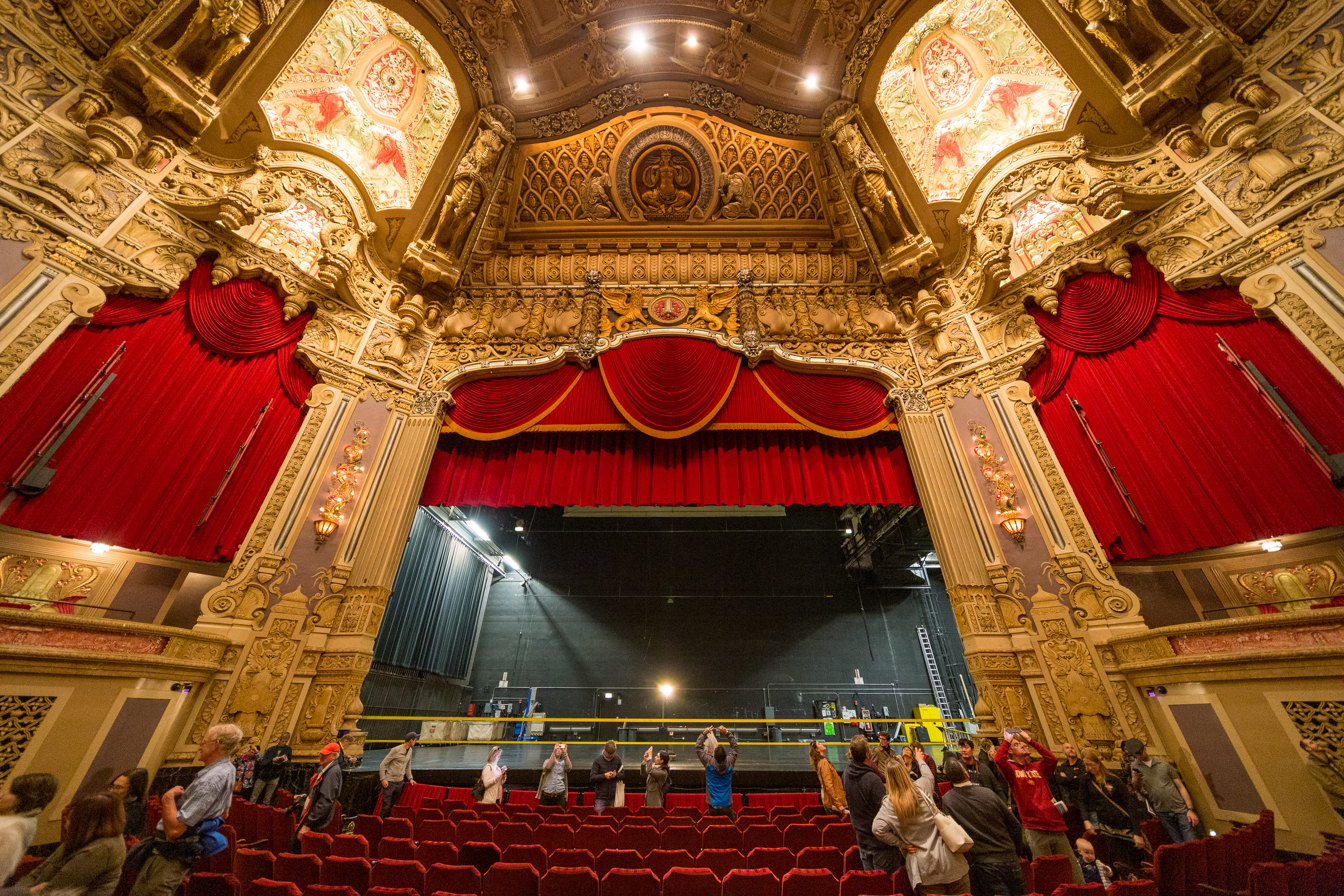
James M. Nederlander Theatre. Originally the Oriental Theatre. George L. and Cornelius W. Rapp, 1926.

Jimmy was the first of the brothers to go into the family business. He dropped out of the pre-law program at the Detroit Institute of Technology, took a job in the box office of the Lafayette Theater, and then worked as the treasurer in the traveling Air Force production of Moss Hart's Winged Victory which played on Broadway where he made valuable connections. After his father's death in the 1960s, the Nederlander brothers continued to purchase theaters expanding nationally with Jimmy moving to New York City, Harry to San Francisco, and Joey remaining in Detroit. Their largest rivals were the Shubert family, the founders of Broadway theatre district in New York City. From 1965 to 1985, Jimmy purchased ten theaters in New York City and produced hundreds of plays forming close relationships with producers David Merrick, Alexander H. Cohen, and Emanuel Azenberg. In 1973, Nederlander and his brothers joined with George Steinbrenner as limited partners when Steinbrenner purchased the New York Yankees of Major League Baseball.

The Nederlander Organization controls nine Broadway theaters and is the second largest owner, of the three companies that dominate Broadway after the Shubert Organization (which owns sixteen theaters) and ahead of Jujamcyn (which owns five). The Nederlander Organization owns a larger number of theater houses than the others with an additional fifteen theaters nationwide. They are the only one of the three that is still run by its owners.

== Personal life ==
Nederlander was married twice. His first wife was Barbara Smith with whom he had a son, James L. Nederlander, the current CEO and owner of the Nederlander Organization. In 1969, he married his second wife Charlene Saunders (born 1934).

Broadway in Chicago announced on November 13, 2018, that the Oriental Theater was to be renamed in honor of James, the founder of Broadway In Chicago. On February 8, 2019 the venue unveiled its newly renovated marquee, vertical blade sign and signage as the James M. Nederlander Theatre.

== Awards and nominations ==
=== Tony Awards ===
Year	Nominated work	Role	Category	Result
1974	Seesaw	Producer	Best Musical	Nominated
1977	Otherwise Engaged	Producer	Best Play	Nominated
1979	Whose Life Is It Anyway?	Producer	Best Play	Nominated
1980	West Side Story	Producer	Best Revival	Nominated
1981	Woman of the Year	Producer	Best Musical	Nominated
1982	The Dresser	Producer	Best Play	Nominated
1982	The Life and Adventures of Nicholas Nickleby	Producer	Best Play	Won
1982	Nine	Producer	Best Musical	Won
1983	Merlin	Producer	Best Musical	Nominated
1984	Noises Off	Producer	Best Play	Nominated
1984	La Cage aux Folles	Producer	Best Musical	Won
1985	Strange Interlude	Producer	Best Revival	Nominated
1985	Cyrano de Bergerac	Producer	Best Revival	Nominated
1985	Much Ado About Nothing	Producer	Best Revival	Nominated
1985	Grind	Producer	Best Musical	Nominated
1986	Sweet Charity	Producer	Best Revival	Won
1986	The Iceman Cometh	Producer	Best Revival	Nominated
1986	Benefactors	Producer	Best Play	Nominated
1987	Les Liaisons Dangereuses	Producer	Best Play	Nominated
1987	Me and My Girl	Producer	Best Musical	Nominated
1989	Cafe Crown	Producer	Best Revival	Nominated
1991	Peter Pan	Producer	Best Revival	Nominated
1991	Shadowlands	Producer	Best Revival	Nominated
1991	The Will Rogers Follies	Producer	Best Musical	Won
1993	The Goodbye Girl	Producer	Best Musical	Nominated
1994	She Loves Me	Producer	Best Revival of a Musical	Nominated
1995	How to Succeed in Business Without Really Trying	Producer	Best Revival of a Musical	Nominated
1996	The King and I	Producer	Best Revival of a Musical	Won
1998	A View From the Bridge	Producer	Best Revival of a Play	Won
1998	1776	Producer	Best Revival of a Musical	Nominated
1999	Peter Pan	Producer	Best Revival of a Musical	Nominated
2000	Copenhagen	Producer	Best Play	Won
2002	Private Lives	Producer	Best Revival of a Play	Won
2004	Special Tony Award	Recipient	Lifetime Achievement in the Theatre	Won
2013	Annie	Producer	Best Revival of a Musical	Nominated
2016	Fiddler on the Roof	Producer	Best Revival of a Musical	Nominated
2016	School of Rock	Producer	Best Musical	Nominated

=== Drama Desk Awards ===
Year	Nominated work	Role	Category	Result
1975	London Assurance	Producer	Unique Theatrical Experience	Won
1977	Otherwise Engaged	Producer	Outstanding New Play (Foreign)	Won
1980	Night and Day	Producer	Outstanding New Play	Nominated
1981	Lena Horne: The Lady and Her Music	Producer	Outstanding Musical	Nominated
1982	Nine	Producer	Outstanding Musical	Won
1984	Noises Off	Producer	Outstanding New Play	Nominated
1984	La Cage aux Folles	Producer	Outstanding Musical	Nominated
1985	Aren't We All?	Producer	Outstanding Revival	Nominated
1986	The Iceman Cometh	Producer	Outstanding Revival	Nominated
1986	Benefactors	Producer	Outstanding New Play	Nominated
[1987	Les Liaisons Dangereuses	Producer	Outstanding New Play	Nominated
1987	Me and My Girl	Producer	Outstanding Musical	Nominated
1991	The Will Rogers Follies	Producer	Outstanding Musical	Won
1995	How to Succeed in Business Without Really Trying	Producer	Outstanding Musical	Nominated
1996	The King and I	Producer	Outstanding Revival of a Musical	Won
2000	Copenhagen	Producer	Outstanding New Play	Won
2002	Private Lives	Producer	Outstanding Revival of a Play	Won
2003	Medea	Producer	Outstanding Revival of a Play	Nominated
2016	Fiddler on the Roof	Producer	Outstanding Revival of a Musical	Nominated
2016	School of Rock	Producer	Outstanding Musical	Nominated

== See also ==
- James M. Nederlander Theatre
