= Oakbrook Terrace, Illinois =

Suburb of Chicago

Oakbrook Terrace
- City
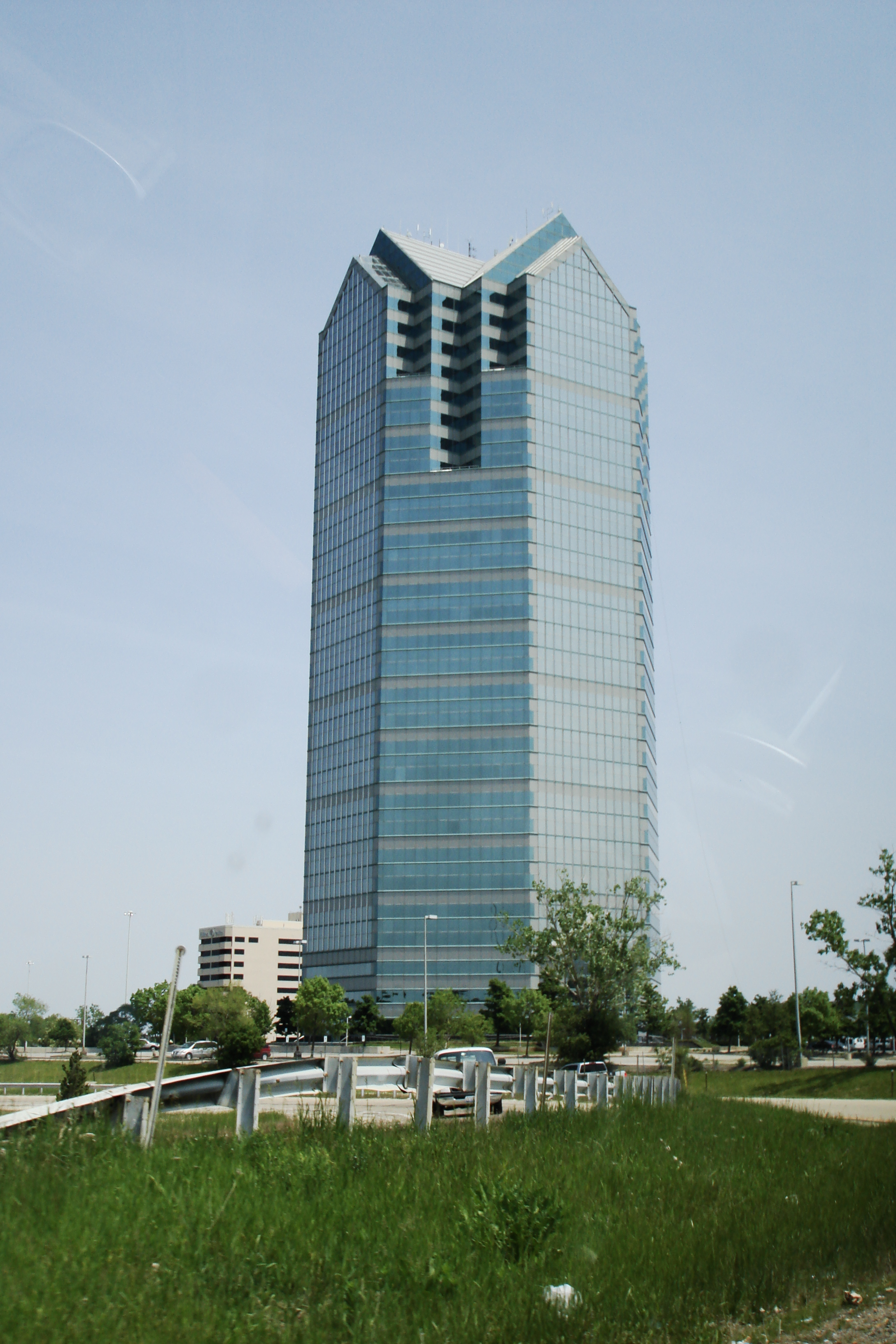
- The Oakbrook Terrace Tower

- Flag Seal
- Interactive map of Oakbrook Terrace
- Coordinates: 41°51′14″N 87°58′08″W
- Country: United States
- State: Illinois
- County: DuPage
- Township: York
- Incorporated: 1959

Government
  - Type: Mayor–council

Area
  - Total: 1.33 sq mi (3.45 km^{2})
  - Land: 1.31 sq mi (3.38 km^{2})
  - Water: 0.027 sq mi (0.07 km^{2}) 2.36%
- Elevation: 709 ft (216 m)

Population (2020)
  - Total: 2,751
  - Density: 2,107.1/sq mi (813.55/km^{2})

Standard of living
  - Per capita income: $44,345 (median: $59,148)
  - Home value: $202,186 (median: $170,700 (2000))
- Time zone: UTC-6 (CST)
  - Summer (DST): UTC-5 (CDT)
- ZIP code: 60181
- Area codes: 630 and 331
- FIPS code: 17-54560
- GNIS feature ID: 2395286
- Website: www.oakbrookterrace.net

Oakbrook Terrace is a city in DuPage County, Illinois, United States and is a suburb of Chicago. Per the 2020 census, the population was 2,751.

== History ==
Oakbrook Terrace was originally named Utopia, a name suggested by a postmaster. The name Oakbrook Terrace was adopted in November 1959.

== Geography ==
According to the 2021 census gazetteer files, Oakbrook Terrace has a total area of 1.33 square miles (3.44 km^{2}), of which 1.31 square miles (3.39 km^{2}) (or 98.12%) is land and 0.03 square miles (0.08 km^{2}) (or 1.88%) is water.

Historical population
Census	Pop.	Note	%±
1960	1,121		—
1970	1,126		0.4%
1980	2,285		102.9%
1990	1,907		−16.5%
2000	2,300		20.6%
2010	2,134		−7.2%
2020	2,751		28.9%
U.S. Decennial Census; 2010 2020

== Demographics ==
=== Racial and ethnic composition ===
Oakbrook Terrace city, Illinois – Racial and ethnic composition Note: the US Census treats Hispanic/Latino as an ethnic category. This table excludes Latinos from the racial categories and assigns them to a separate category. Hispanics/Latinos may be of any race.
Race / Ethnicity (NH = Non-Hispanic)	Pop 2000	Pop 2010	Pop 2020	% 2000	% 2010	% 2020
White alone (NH)	1,791	1,424	1,609	77.87%	66.73%	58.49%
Black or African American alone (NH)	90	165	246	3.91%	7.73%	8.94%
Native American or Alaska Native alone (NH)	0	0	4	0.00%	0.00%	0.15%
Asian alone (NH)	281	293	487	12.22%	13.73%	17.70%
Pacific Islander alone (NH)	1	3	1	0.04%	0.14%	0.04%
Other race alone (NH)	2	2	16	0.09%	0.09%	0.58%
Mixed race or Multiracial (NH)	40	23	80	1.74%	1.08%	2.91%
Hispanic or Latino (any race)	95	224	308	4.13%	10.50%	11.20%
Total	2,300	2,134	2,751	100.00%	100.00%	100.00%

=== 2020 census ===
As of the 2020 census, Oakbrook Terrace had a population of 2,751. The population density was 2,066.87 inhabitants per square mile (798.02/km^{2}).

The median age was 40.5 years. 14.3% of residents were under the age of 18 and 22.3% of residents were 65 years of age or older. For every 100 females there were 87.1 males, and for every 100 females age 18 and over there were 87.1 males age 18 and over. 100.0% of residents lived in urban areas, while 0.0% lived in rural areas.

There were 1,404 households in Oakbrook Terrace, of which 18.3% had children under the age of 18 living in them. Of all households, 32.9% were married-couple households, 25.1% were households with a male householder and no spouse or partner present, and 34.4% were households with a female householder and no spouse or partner present. About 44.3% of all households were made up of individuals and 14.6% had someone living alone who was 65 years of age or older.

There were 1,659 housing units, of which 15.4% were vacant. The homeowner vacancy rate was 0.8% and the rental vacancy rate was 18.8%.

=== Income and poverty ===
The median income for a household in the city was $61,563, and the median income for a family was $89,900. Males had a median income of $54,911 versus $50,500 for females. The per capita income for the city was $37,713. About 7.8% of families and 16.7% of the population were below the poverty line, including 4.2% of those under age 18 and 8.1% of those age 65 or over.

== Economy ==
- Flood Brothers Disposal (1930), waste management and recycling service

== Points of interest ==
Oakbrook Terrace Tower, an octagonal 31-story office building, was designed by Helmut Jahn and built in 1987. It is the tallest building in Illinois outside the city limits of Chicago and is currently owned by Edward Napleton, president of the Ed Napleton Automotive Group. The 418-foot (127 m) tower has 773,000 square feet (71,800 m^{2}) of office space. The tower was long dogged by rumors and news reports that it was leaning or sinking. It stands on the site of the former Dispensa's Kiddie Kingdom and Castle of Toys.

Drury Lane is a large theater and conference center adjacent to the Oakbrook Terrace Tower. It boasts a 2,000 seat banquet hall and a 971-seat theater. The facility can host: wedding receptions and banquets, corporate meetings and conferences, trade shows and conventions, live theater, and concerts. Located on the site is a Hilton Suites Hotel and Hilton Garden Inn.

The headquarters of the Joint Commission, which accredits US healthcare entities, are located in Oakbrook Terrace. Additionally, Redbox maintained its headquarters in Oakbrook Terrace until it closed due to bankruptcy in 2024.

== Transportation ==
Pace provides bus service on Routes 301, 313 and 322 connecting Oakbrook Terrace to Chicago, Wheaton, and other destinations.
