= Broadway Playhouse at Water Tower Place =

Theater in Chicago, Illinois, US

- Drury Lane Theatre Water Tower Place
- Interactive map of Broadway Playhouse at Water Tower Place
- Address: 175 East Chestnut Street; Chicago, Illinois; United States
- Coordinates: 41°53′53″N 87°37′20″W
- Owner: Brookfield Properties
- Operator: Broadway In Chicago/Nederlander Organization
- Capacity: 549
- Type: Touring theatre

Construction
- Opened: 1976
- Reopened: 2004

Website
- BroadwayInChicago.com

Broadway Playhouse at Water Tower Place is operated by Broadway In Chicago, a Nederlander subsidiary. Located at Water Tower Place in Chicago, Illinois, it was formerly known as Drury Lane Theatre Water Tower Place. It was reopened in 2004 and seats 549.

== History ==
The original Drury Lane Water Tower Place opened in 1976, but was closed in 1983 and became a movie theater.

Drury Lane Theatre group founder Tony DeSantis later spent $9 million to transform another movie theater located nearby on 175 East Chestnut Street just off Michigan Avenue into a showplace for live performances in Chicago. The new Drury Lane Water Tower Place, opened May 18, 2004 with similar décor and mainstream musical and comedy line-ups of its sister theater in Oakbrook. This next era for the 549-seat Drury Lane Water Tower began with performances of The Full Monty. This was followed by Broadway In Chicago productions of The 25th Annual Putnam County Spelling Bee, SHOUT! The Mod Musical and Xanadu.

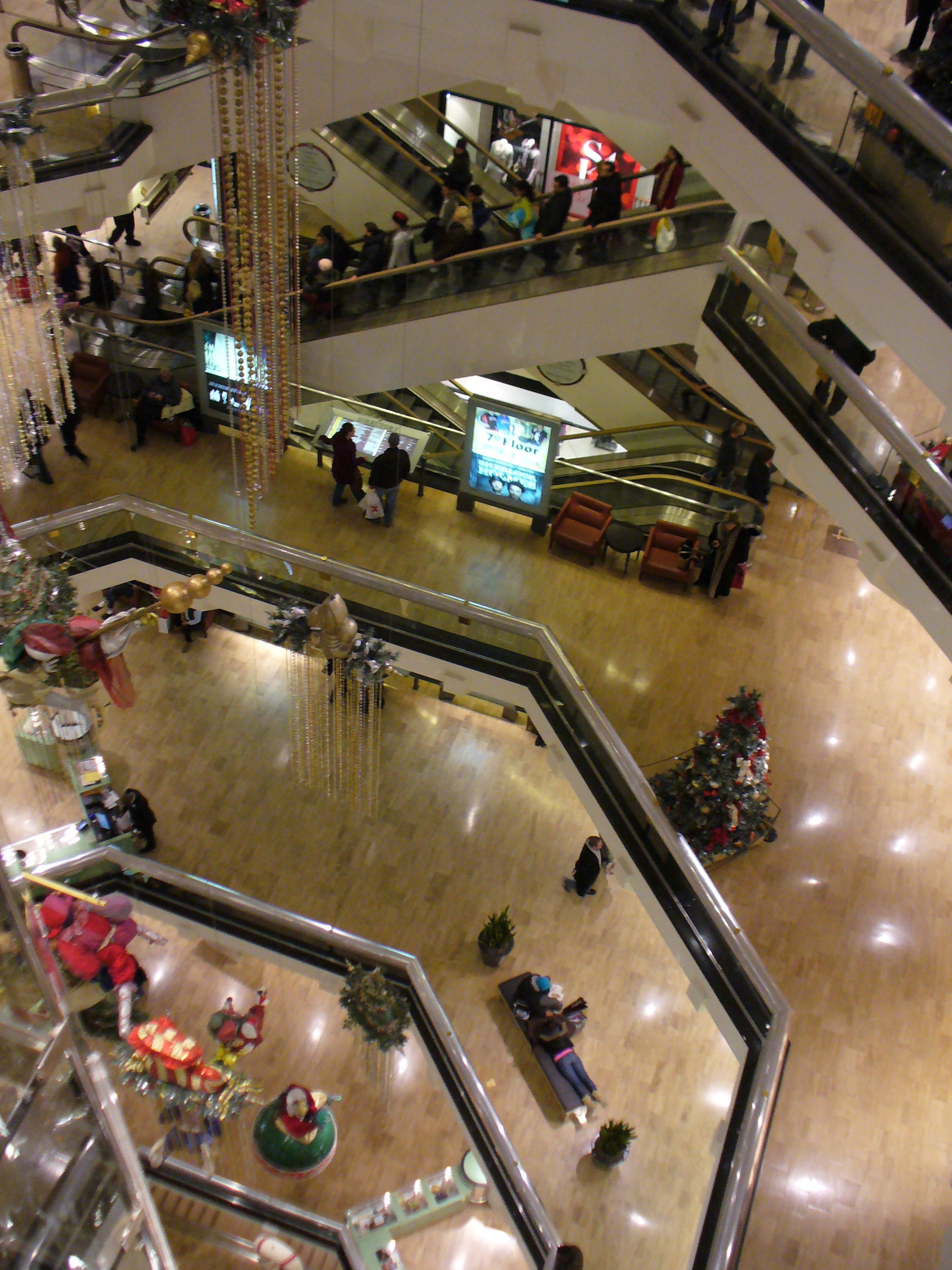
The rebranded Broadway Playhouse opened next to the Water Tower shopping center in September 2010.

On April 6, 2010, Broadway In Chicago announced that it had entered into a long-term agreement with General Growth Properties, then the owner of Water Tower Place shopping center, to re-open the theatre as the Broadway Playhouse at Water Tower Place.

The theater officially re-opened on September 24, 2010, with a short series of concert performances by Sutton Foster, followed by a production of Traces, a French Canadian urban acrobatics show. The first marquee production at the Broadway Playhouse was a new production of the 1978 Studs Terkel musical Working, featuring additional material written by Lin-Manuel Miranda, the writer behind In the Heights and later Hamilton. David Stone, the producer of Wicked and Next to Normal, as well as Mark Platt were also involved with the show that went up in spring of 2011.
