= James L. Nederlander =

American theatre director (born 1960)

- Born: January 23, 1960 (age 66); Detroit, Michigan
- Occupations: Live theater owner, operator, and producer
- Known for: President of the Nederlander Organization
- Spouse: Margo MacNabb (m. 2008)
- Parent(s): James M. Nederlander; Barbara Smith
- Family: Robert Nederlander (uncle); Joseph Z. Nederlander (uncle)

James L. Nederlander (born January 23, 1960) is a Broadway theatre owner, operator, producer and presenter. He is the president of the Nederlander Organization, which was founded by his grandfather. He is also a 13-time Tony Award winner and has been nominated 32 other times for Tony Awards.

== Biography ==
Nederlander was born the son of Barbara Smith and James M. Nederlander. He has a wide range of credits; as a theatre owner since 1970 and as a producer since 1984. James Nederlander is a minority owner of the New York Yankees and Florida Panthers.

Nederlander serves on the board of the Fisher Center for Alzheimer's Research Foundation in New York City.

== Personal life ==
In 2008, he married Margo MacNabb at Christ Church United Methodist in New York City.

== See also ==
- Nederlander Organization
- Detroit Theatre District
- Nederlander Theatre
