= Broadway In Chicago =

Theatrical production company

Broadway In Chicago is a theatrical production company. It was formed in July 2000 by the Nederlander Organization to present touring Broadway productions in Chicago and currently manages programming at five historic theaters. Occasionally, it presents tryouts and world premieres.

== Theaters ==
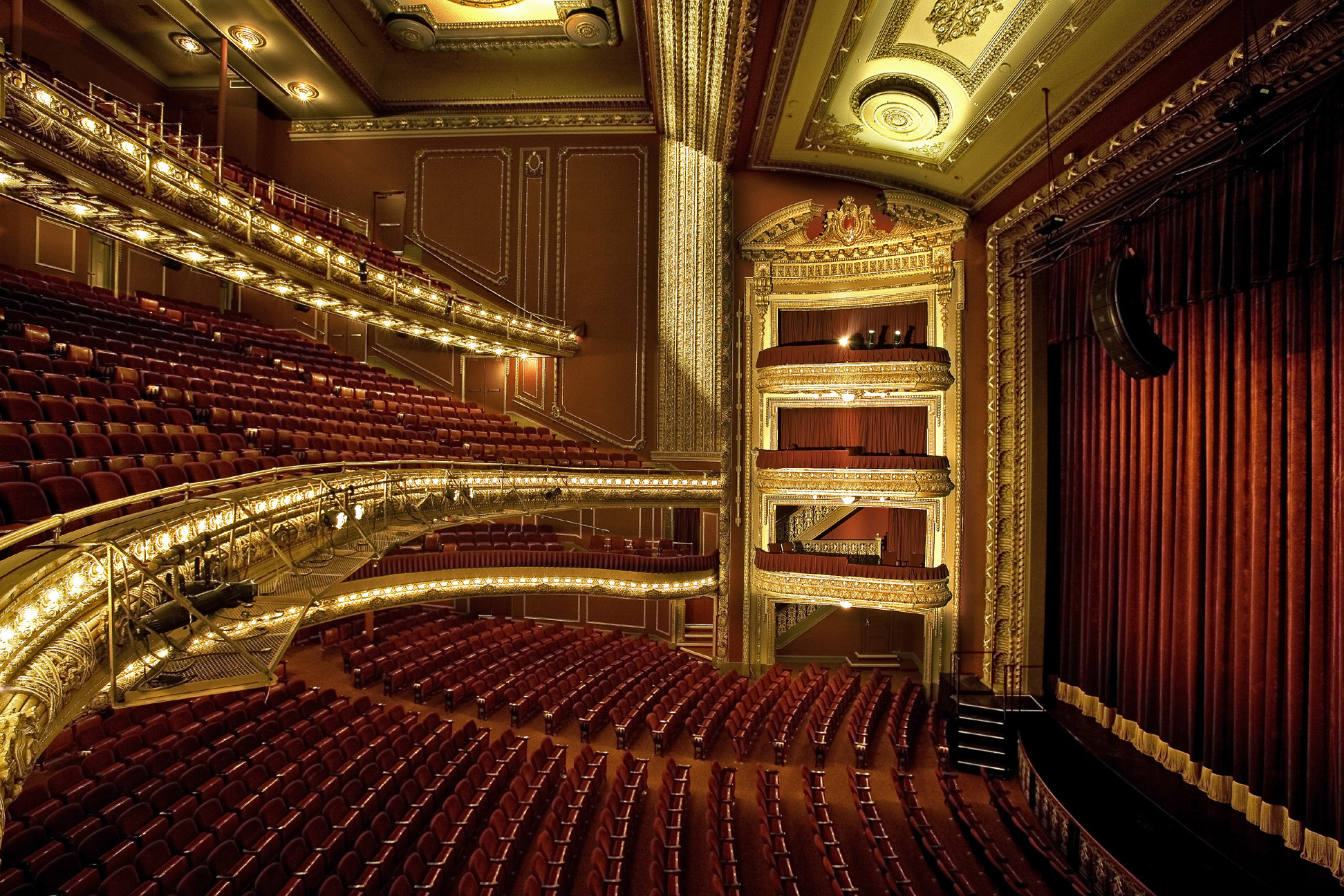
Auditorium of the CIBC Theatre.

Broadway In Chicago operates five venues in downtown Chicago: the CIBC Theatre (18 W. Monroe St.), James M. Nederlander Theatre (24 W. Randolph St.), Cadillac Palace Theatre (151 W. Randolph St.), the Auditorium Theatre (50 E. Ida B. Wells Dr.), and the Broadway Playhouse at Water Tower Place (175 E. Chestnut St.)

== Economic impact ==
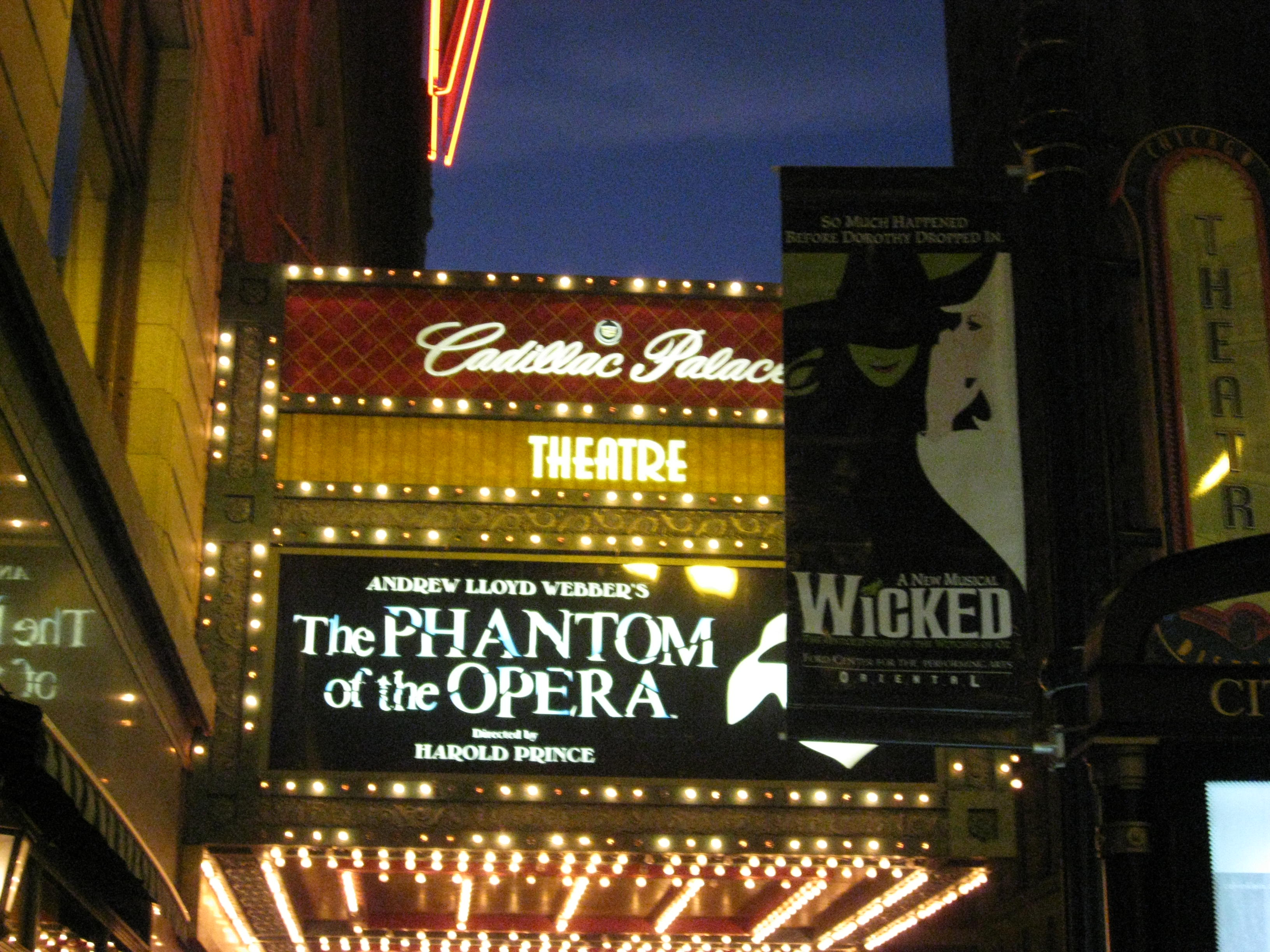
The Cadillac Palace Theatre is located in the Chicago Loop area.

Since 2001, Broadway In Chicago has had an attendance of over 6.5 million people. Broadway In Chicago is located in Chicago's Theater District and is currently the fifth-largest tourist attraction in Chicago. Approximately 42% of audiences are from out-of-state, and of these out-of-town patrons, 82% attribute the production as the main reason for their visit to Chicago. Broadway In Chicago provides over 7,500 jobs and has an economic impact of over $635 million each year. In addition, Broadway In Chicago audiences spend more than $75 million at local restaurants and account for 500,000 hotel room occupancies each year, which is 6% of Chicago's annual total of hotel rooms used.

Broadway In Chicago also contributes to various public benefits throughout the City of Chicago by providing complimentary tickets to many charitable organizations and to the Chicago Public Schools. Other public benefits include a field trip reward program, special access programs for seniors, and discounted programs for many of Chicago's youth groups.

=== Notable productions ===
Broadway in Chicago has hosted multiple pre-broadway productions. These productions include The Pirate Queen, The Producers, Movin' Out, Mamma Mia!, Aida, All Shook Up, Sweet Smell of Success, Tallulah, A Thousand Clowns, Sweet Charity, Spamalot, Blast!, The Addams Family, Kinky Boots, Big Fish, The Last Ship, Amazing Grace, Gotta Dance, The SpongeBob Musical, Pretty Woman: The Musical, Tootsie, and Boop! The Musical. Broadway In Chicago was also responsible for bringing many long-running productions to the city including Wicked, The 25th Annual Putnam County Spelling Bee, Disney's The Lion King, Jersey Boys, Ragtime, The Book of Mormon and Hamilton.
