= Nederlander Organization =

American theatre and music venue operator

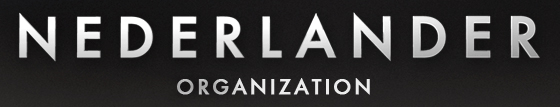
- Type: Private
- Industry: Theatre
- Founded: 1912; 114 years ago in Detroit, Michigan, United States
- Founder: David Nederlander
- Headquarters: New York City, New York, United States
- Key people: James L. Nederlander; James M. Nederlander; Joseph Z. Nederlander
- Website: www.nederlander.com

The Nederlander Organization, founded in 1912 by David T. Nederlander in Detroit, and currently based in New York City, is one of the largest operators of live theaters and music venues in the United States. Its first acquisition was a lease on the Detroit Opera House in 1912. The building was demolished in 1928. It later operated the Shubert Lafayette Theatre until its demolition in 1964 and the Riviera Theatre, both in Detroit. Since then, the organization has grown to include nine Broadway theaters, making it the second-largest owner of Broadway theaters after the Shubert Organization, and a number of theaters across the United States, including five large theaters in Chicago, plus three West End theatres in London.

== Current venues ==
=== Broadway theatres ===
- Gershwin Theatre
- Lena Horne Theatre
- Lunt-Fontanne Theatre
- Marquis Theatre
- Minskoff Theatre
- Nederlander Theatre
- Palace Theatre
- Richard Rodgers Theatre
- Neil Simon Theatre

=== West End theatres ===
- Adelphi Theatre (co-owned with Andrew Lloyd Webber's LW Theatres)
- Aldwych Theatre
- Dominion Theatre

=== Chicago theatres ===
- Auditorium Theatre (booking rights; owned by Roosevelt University)
- Broadway Playhouse at Water Tower Place
- Cadillac Palace Theatre
- CIBC Theatre
- Nederlander Theatre

=== Other US venues ===
- Centennial Hall – under contract with the University of Arizona, Tucson
- The Grove of Anaheim – Anaheim, California
- Pantages Theatre – Los Angeles
- Balboa Theatre – San Diego
- Civic Theatre – San Diego
- San Jose Center for the Performing Arts – San Jose, California
- San Jose Civic Auditorium – San Jose, California
- Santa Barbara Bowl – Santa Barbara, California
- Durham Performing Arts Center – Durham, North Carolina
- Steven Tanger Center for the Performing Arts – Greensboro, North Carolina
- North Charleston Performing Arts Center – North Charleston, South Carolina
- Heritage Bank Center – Cincinnati, Ohio and its tenant, the Cincinnati Cyclones Professional Ice Hockey Team
- National Theatre – Washington, DC under contract with The National Theatre
- West Harbor Amphitheater Los Angeles—under development as of 2023.

== Former venues ==
=== Former Broadway theatres ===
- Biltmore Theatre (sold)
- Henry Miller's Theatre (sold)
- Mark Hellinger Theatre (sold)
- New Amsterdam Theatre (sold)

=== Other former venues ===
- Alpine Valley Music Theatre – East Troy, Wisconsin (sold)
- Arie Crown Theater – Chicago (1977–1986; contract ended)
- Arrowhead Pond – Anaheim, California 1994–2004(management contract ended)
- Birmingham Theatre – Birmingham, Michigan (1979-1994; contract ended; reverted to cinema)
- Bogart's – Cincinnati (sold)
- Concord Pavilion – Concord, California (management contract ended)
- Curran Theatre – San Francisco (sold in 2010)
- Masonic Theatre – Detroit (management contract ended)
- Detroit Opera House – Detroit; owned and operated by Michigan Opera Theatre (interest sold in April 2021)
- Fisher Theatre – Detroit (sold in April 2021)
- Fox Tucson Theatre – Tucson, Arizona (changed venues)
- Fox Theatre – San Diego (management contract ended)
- Golden Gate Theatre – San Francisco (sold in April 2021)
- Grand Riviera Theater – Detroit (closed 1974; demolished 1999)
- Greek Theatre – Los Angeles (1975-2015; contract ended)
- New World Music Theater – Tinley Park, Illinois (sold)
- McVickers Theatre – Chicago
- Merriweather Post Pavilion – Columbia, Maryland (sold)
- Morris A. Mechanic Theatre – Baltimore (closed)
- National Theatre – Washington, D.C. (1970–1982)
- Orpheum Theatre – San Francisco (sold in April 2021)
- Palace West – Phoenix
- Pacific Amphitheatre – Costa Mesa, California (management contract sold)
- Pine Knob Music Theatre – Clarkston, Michigan (sold in 1990)
- Poplar Creek Music Theater – Hoffman Estates, Illinois (sold and demolished 1994-1995)
- Riverbend Music Center – Cincinnati (booking only, 1984–1999; sold)
- Fox Performing Arts Center – Riverside, California (contract ended)
- Shubert Lafayette Theatre – Detroit (demolished 1964)
- Studebaker Theatre – Chicago
- Target Center – Minneapolis (co-managed 2004–2007)
- Taft Theatre – Cincinnati (sold)
- Tucson Music Hall – Tucson (management contract ended)
- Wang Theatre – Boston (1982–1984; contract ended)
- Wilshire Theatre – Beverly Hills, California (1981–1989; contract ended).

== Broadway Direct ==
In 2011, the Nederlander Organization launched Broadway Direct. Broadway Direct is a ticketing platform for a range of New York based shows. They also publish Broadway news.

== Subscription series ==
- Best of Broadway (North Charleston)
- Broadway In Chicago
- Broadway In Detroit
- Broadway Los Angeles (formerly Los Angeles Civic Light Opera)
- Broadway San Diego (formerly San Diego Playgoers)
- Broadway in Tucson
- Truist Broadway (Durham, North Carolina)

== Legal actions ==
In 1993, the Orange County Fair Board purchased the remaining 30 years of Nederlander's 40-year lease on the Pacific Amphitheatre for $12.5 million. The board filed suit against Nederlander in 1995 maintaining that the organization placed restrictive sound covenants in the sale contract that made the venue unusable and therefore eliminated it from competing with the nearby Greek Theatre and Arrowhead Pond.

In January 2014, Nederlander settled a suit with the U.S. Attorney's Office in New York City over violations of the Americans with Disabilities Act. Under the consent decree, Nederlander agreed to make alterations within three-years to nine of its theatres in New York to make them more accessible and pay a $45,000 penalty. The case was one in a series filed by the U.S. Attorney against a number of public venues in the city.

== Gallery ==
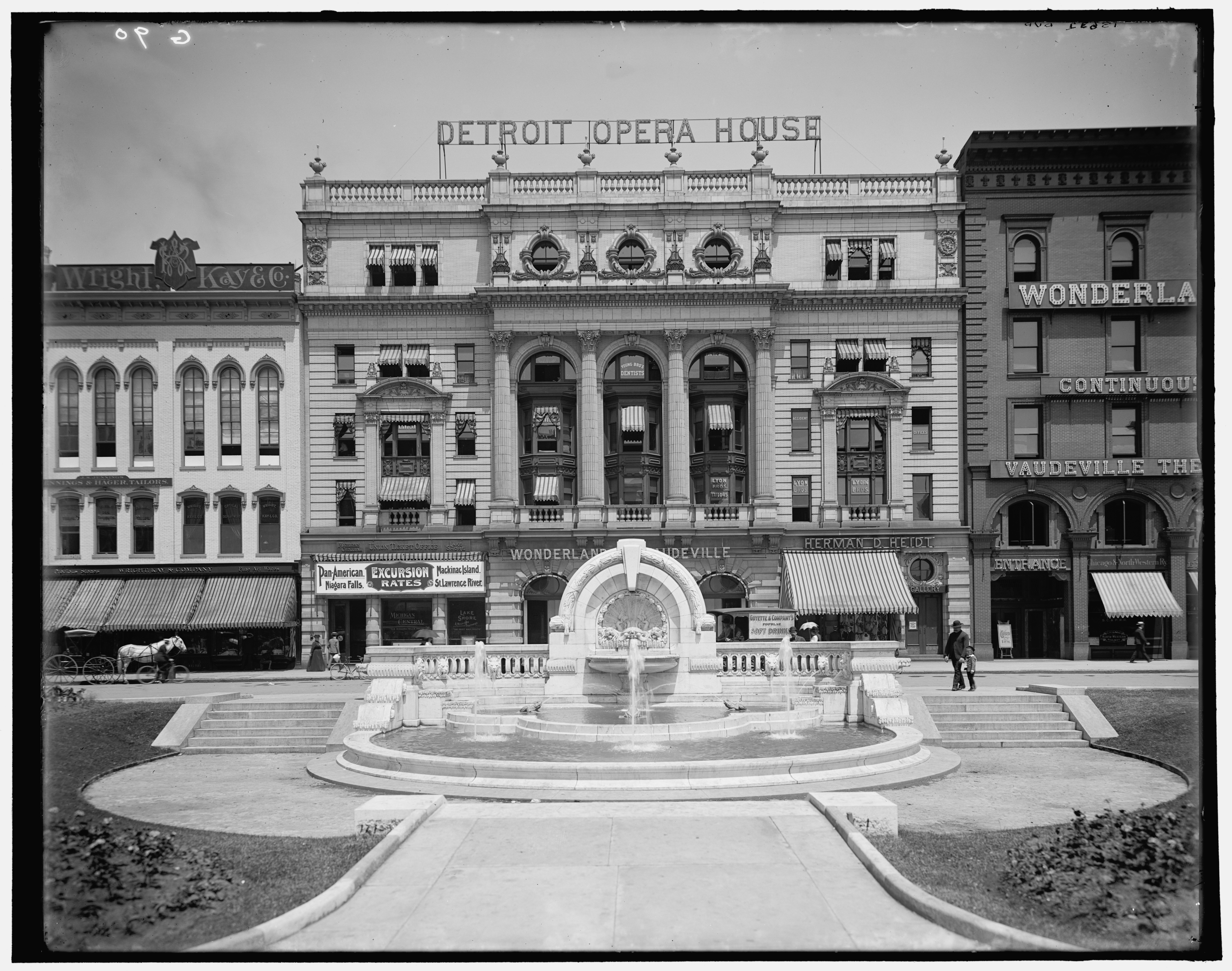
Old Detroit Opera House c. 1905

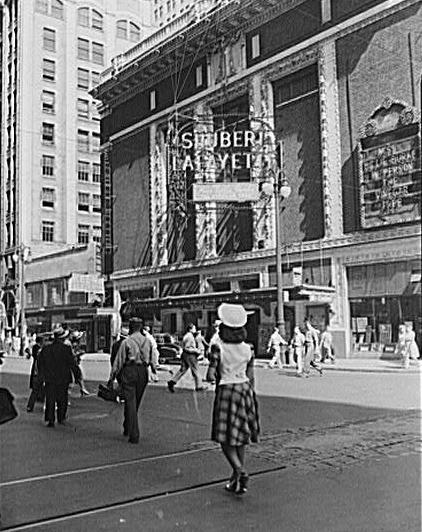
Shubert Lafayette in July 1942

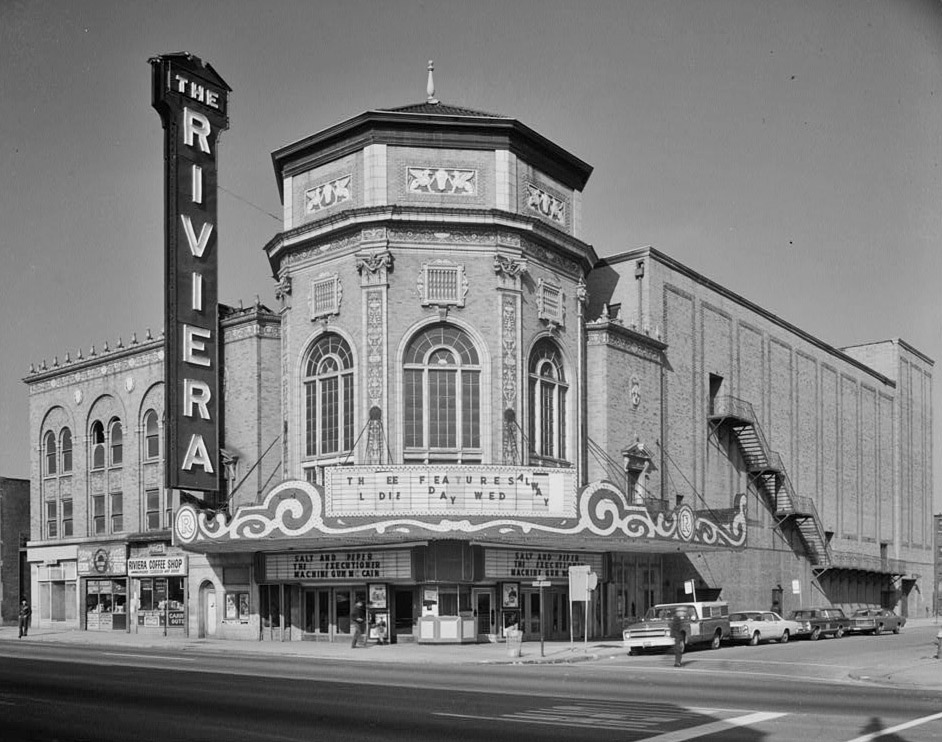
Grand Riviera Theatre in Detroit c. 1970

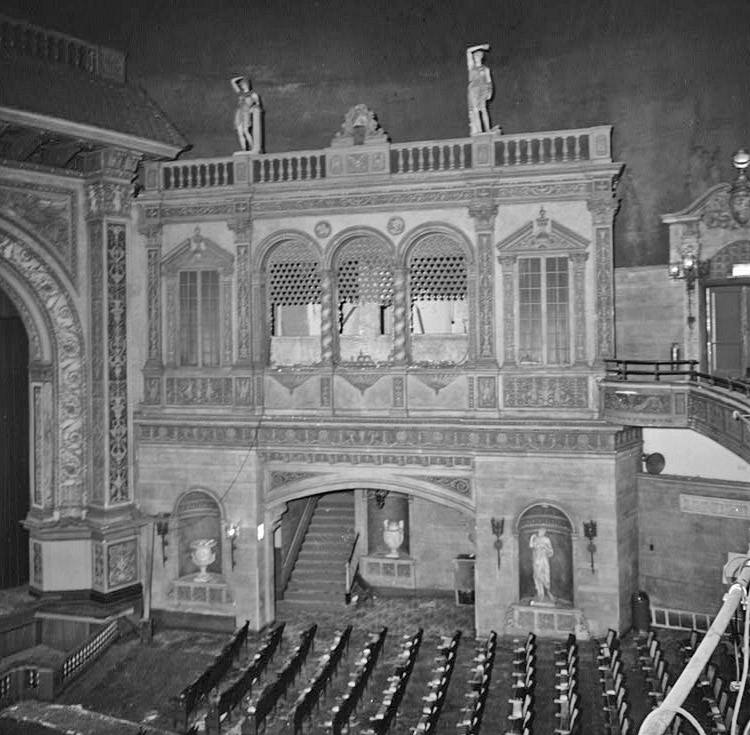
Grand Riviera Auditorium c. 1970

== See also ==
- SHN (theatres)
