= Tony Award for Best Revival of a Musical =

Broadway theater award

- Awarded for: Best Revival of a Musical
- Location: New York City
- Presented by: American Theatre Wing; The Broadway League
- Currently held by: Ragtime (2026)
- Website: http://tonyawards.com

The Tony Award for Best Revival of a Musical has been awarded since 1994. Before that time, both plays and musicals were considered together for the Tony Award for Best Revival. The award is given to the producers of the best musical play which has already appeared on Broadway in a previous production, or is regarded as being in the common theatrical repertoire. Like Best Musical, excerpts from the musicals that are nominated for this award are usually performed during the ceremony and before this award is presented.

Beginning in 2019, author(s) and composer(s) are also eligible for this award when the production has not had any prior Broadway production and are living at the time the production receives the determination; they will be considered eligible along with the producers of the production. Additionally, if the author(s) and composer(s) have substantially re-worked the play or musical, whether or not winning for the work previously, are eligible to be nominated alongside the producers.

== Winners and nominees ==
indicates the winner

=== 1970s ===
Year	Production	Nominees
Best Revival
1977 (31st)
1977 (31st)	Porgy and Bess	Sherwin M. Goldman and Houston Grand Opera
1977 (31st)	The Cherry Orchard	Joseph Papp
1977 (31st)	Guys and Dolls	Moe Septee in association with Victor H. Potamkin, Carmen F. Zollo and Ashton Springer
1977 (31st)	The Threepenny Opera	Joseph Papp
1978 (32nd)
1978 (32nd)	Dracula	Jujamcyn Theaters, Elizabeth Ireland McCann, John Wulp, Victor Lurie, Nelle Nugent and Max Weitzenhoffer
1978 (32nd)	Tartuffe	Circle in the Square
1978 (32nd)	Timbuktu!	Luther Davis
1978 (32nd)	A Touch of the Poet	Elliot Martin

=== 1980s ===
Year	Production	Nominees
1980 (34th)
1980 (34th)	Morning's at Seven	Elizabeth Ireland McCann, Nelle Nugent and Ray Larson
1980 (34th)	Major Barbara	Circle in the Square
1980 (34th)	Peter Pan	Zev Buffman
1980 (34th)	West Side Story	Gladys Rackmil, John F. Kennedy Center for the Performing Arts, James M. Nederlander and Ruth Mitchell
1981 (35th)
1981 (35th)	The Pirates of Penzance	Joseph Papp and New York Shakespeare Festival
1981 (35th)	Brigadoon	Zev Buffman and The Shubert Organization
1981 (35th)	Camelot	Mike Merrick and Don Gregory
1981 (35th)	The Little Foxes	Zev Buffman, Donald C. Carter and Jon Cultler
1982 (36th)
1982 (36th)	Othello	Barry and Fran Weissler and CBS Video Enterprises
1982 (36th)	Medea	Barry and Fran Weissler, John F. Kennedy Center for the Performing Arts and Bunny and Warren Austin
1982 (36th)	My Fair Lady	Mike Merrick and Don Gregory
1982 (36th)	A Taste of Honey	Roundabout Theatre Company, Gene Feist and Michael Fried
1983 (37th)
1983 (37th)	On Your Toes	Alfred de Liagre Jr., Roger L. Stevens, John Mauceri, Donald R. Seawell and Andre Pastoria
1983 (37th)	All's Well That Ends Well	Royal Shakespeare Company
1983 (37th)	The Caine Mutiny Court-Martial	Circle in the Square Theatre and John F. Kennedy Center for the Performing Arts
1983 (37th)	A View from the Bridge	Zev Buffman and Sidney Schlenker
1984 (38th)
1984 (38th)	Death of a Salesman	Robert Whitehead and Roger L. Stevens
1984 (38th)	American Buffalo	Elliot Martin and Arnold Bernhard
1984 (38th)	Heartbreak House	Circle in the Square
1984 (38th)	A Moon for the Misbegotten	The Shubert Organization and Emanuel Azenberg
1985 (39th)
1985 (39th)	Joe Egg	The Shubert Organization, Emanuel Azenberg, Roger Berlind, Ivan Bloch and MTM Enterprises Inc.
1985 (39th)	Cyrano de Bergerac	James M. Nederlander, Elizabeth Ireland McCann, Nelle Nugent, Cynthia Wood, Dale Duffy and Allan Carr
1985 (39th)	Much Ado About Nothing	James M. Nederlander, Elizabeth Ireland McCann, Nelle Nugent, Cynthia Wood, Dale Duffy and Allan Carr
1985 (39th)	Strange Interlude	Robert Michael Geisler, John Roberdeau, Douglas Urbanski, James M. Nederlander, Duncan Weldon, Paul Gregg, Lionel Becker and Jerome Minskoff
1986 (40th)
1986 (40th)	Sweet Charity	Jerome Minskoff, James M. Nederlander, Arthur Rubin and Joseph Harris
1986 (40th)	Hay Fever	Roger Peters and MBS Co.
1986 (40th)	The Iceman Cometh	Lewis Allen, James M. Nederlander, Stephen Graham and Ben Edwards
1986 (40th)	Loot	David Merrick Arts Foundation, Charles P. Kopelman and Mark Simon
1987 (41st)
1987 (41st)	All My Sons	Jay H. Fuchs, Steven Warnick and Charles Patsos
1987 (41st)	The Front Page	Lincoln Center Theater, Gregory Mosher and Bernard Gersten
1987 (41st)	The Life and Adventures of Nicholas Nickleby	The Shubert Organization, Three Knights Ltd. and Robert Fox Ltd.
1987 (41st)	Pygmalion	The Shubert Organization, Jerome Minskoff and Duncan Weldon
1988 (42nd)
1988 (42nd)	Anything Goes	Lincoln Center Theater, Gregory Mosher and Bernard Gersten
1988 (42nd)	Cabaret	Barry and Fran Weissler
1988 (42nd)	Dreamgirls	Marvin A. Krauss and Irving Siders
1988 (42nd)	A Streetcar Named Desire	Circle in the Square, Theodore Mann and Paul Libin
1989 (43rd)
1989 (43rd)	Our Town	Lincoln Center Theater, Gregory Mosher and Bernard Gersten
1989 (43rd)	Ah, Wilderness!	Ken Marsolis, Alexander H. Cohen, John F. Kennedy Center for the Performing Arts, Yale Repertory Theatre, Richard Norton, Irma Oestreicher and Elizabeth D. White
1989 (43rd)	Ain't Misbehavin'	The Shubert Organization, Emanuel Azenberg, Dasha Epstein and Roger Berlind
1989 (43rd)	Cafe Crown	LeFrak Entertainment, James M. Nederlander, Francine LeFrak, James L. Nederlander and Arthur Rubin

=== 1990s ===
Year	Production	Nominees
1990 (44th)
1990 (44th)	Gypsy	Barry and Fran Weissler, Kathy Levin and Barry Brown
1990 (44th)	The Circle	Elliot Martin, The Shubert Organization and Suntory International Corp.
1990 (44th)	The Merchant of Venice	Duncan Weldon, Jerome Minskoff, Punch Productions and Peter Hall
1990 (44th)	Sweeney Todd	Circle in the Square Theatre, Theodore Mann and Paul Libin
1991 (45th)
1991 (45th)	Fiddler on the Roof	Barry and Fran Weissler and Pace Theatrical Group
1991 (45th)	The Miser	Circle in the Square Theatre, Theodore Mann and Paul Libin
1991 (45th)	Peter Pan	James M. Nederlander, Arthur Rubin, Thomas P. McCoy, Keith Stava, PP Investments Inc. and John. B. Platt
1992 (46th)
1992 (46th)	Guys and Dolls	Dodger Productions, Roger Berlind, Jujamcyn Theaters / TV Asahi, Kardana Productions and John F. Kennedy Center for the Performing Arts
1992 (46th)	The Most Happy Fella	Goodspeed Opera House, Center Theatre Group / Ahmanson Theatre, Lincoln Center Theater, The Shubert Organization and Japan Satellite Broadcasting / Stagevision
1992 (46th)	On Borrowed Time	Circle in the Square Theatre, Theodore Mann, Robert Buckley and Paul Libin
1992 (46th)	The Visit	Roundabout Theatre Company, Todd Haimes and Gene Feist
1993 (47th)
1993 (47th)	Anna Christie	Roundabout Theatre Company and Todd Haimes
1993 (47th)	Saint Joan	National Actors Theatre, Tony Randall and Duncan Weldon
1993 (47th)	The Price	Roundabout Theatre Company and Todd Haimes
1993 (47th)	Wilder, Wilder, Wilder	Circle in the Square Theatre, Theodore Mann, George Elmer, Paul Libin, Willow Cabin Theatre Company, Edward Berkeley, Adam Oliensis and Maria Radman
Best Revival of a Musical
1994 (48th)
1994 (48th)	Carousel	Lincoln Center Theater, André Bishop, Bernard Gersten, Royal National Theatre, Cameron Mackintosh and the Rodgers and Hammerstein Organization
1994 (48th)	Damn Yankees	Mitchell Maxwell, PolyGram Diversified Entertainment, Dan Markley, Kevin McCollum, Victoria Maxwell, Fred H. Krones, Andrea Nasher, The Frankel-Viertel-Baruch Group, Paula Heil Fisher, Julie Ross, Jon B. Platt, Alan Schuster and Peter Breger
1994 (48th)	Grease	Barry and Fran Weissler and Jujamcyn Theaters
1994 (48th)	She Loves Me	Roundabout Theatre Company, Todd Haimes, James M. Nederlander, Elliott Martin, Herbert Wasserman, Freddy Beinstock and Roger L. Stevens
1995 (49th)
1995 (49th)	Show Boat	Livent U.S. Inc.
1995 (49th)	How to Succeed in Business Without Really Trying	Dodger Productions and Kardana Productions Inc., John F. Kennedy Center for the Performing Arts and The Nederlander Organization
1996 (50th)
1996 (50th)	The King and I	Dodger Productions, John F. Kennedy Center for the Performing Arts, James M. Nederlander, Perseus Productions, John Frost, Adelaide Festival Centre and The Rodgers and Hammerstein Organization
1996 (50th)	Company	Roundabout Theatre Company, Todd Haimes and Ellen Richard
1996 (50th)	A Funny Thing Happened on the Way to the Forum	Jujamcyn Theaters, Scott Rudin / Paramount Pictures, The Viertel-Baruch-Frankel Group, Roger Berlind and Dodger Productions
1996 (50th)	Hello, Dolly!	Manny Kladitis, Magic Promotions and Theatricals, Pace Theatrical Group Inc. and Jon B. Platt
1997 (51st)
1997 (51st)	Chicago	Barry and Fran Weissler and Kardana Productions Inc.
1997 (51st)	Annie	Timothy Childs, Rodger Hess, Jujamcyn Theaters, Terri B. Childs and Al Nocciolino
1997 (51st)	Candide	Livent U.S. Inc.
1997 (51st)	Once Upon a Mattress	Dodger Productions and Joop van den Ende
1998 (52nd)
1998 (52nd)	Cabaret	Roundabout Theatre Company, Todd Haimes and Ellen Richard
1998 (52nd)	1776	Roundabout Theatre Company, Todd Haimes, Ellen Richard, James M. Nederlander, Stewart F. Lane, Rodger Hess, Bill Haber, Robert Halmi Jr., Dodger Endemol Theatricals and Hallmark Entertainment
1998 (52nd)	The Sound of Music	Hallmark, Thomas Viertel, Steven Baruch, Richard Frankel, Jujamcyn Theaters, The Rodgers and Hammerstein Organization, Charles Kelman Productions, Simone Genatt Haft, Marc Routh, Jay Binder and Robert Halmi Jr.
1999 (53rd)
1999 (53rd)	Annie Get Your Gun	Barry and Fran Weissler, Kardana, Michael Watt, Irving Welzer and Hal Luftig
1999 (53rd)	Little Me	Roundabout Theatre Company, Todd Haimes, Ellen Richard and Julia C. Levy
1999 (53rd)	Peter Pan	McCoy Rigby Entertainment, The Nederlander Organization, La Mirada Theatre for the Performing Arts, Albert Nocciolino, Larry Payton and J. Lynn Singleton
1999 (53rd)	You're a Good Man, Charlie Brown	Michael Leavitt, Fox Theatricals, Jerry Frankel, Arthur Whitelaw and Gene Persson

=== 2000s ===
Year	Musical	Nominees
2000 (54th)
2000 (54th)	Kiss Me, Kate	Roger Berlind and Roger Horchow
2000 (54th)	Jesus Christ Superstar	The Really Useful Superstar Company Inc., The Nederlander Producing Company of America Inc. and Terry Allen Kramer
2000 (54th)	The Music Man	Dodger Theatricals, John F. Kennedy Center for the Performing Arts, Elizabeth Williams/ Anita Waxman, Kardana-Swinsky Productions and Lorie Cowen Levy / Dede Harris
2000 (54th)	Tango Argentino	DG Producciones
2001 (55th)
2001 (55th)	42nd Street	Dodger Theatricals, Joop van den Ende and Stage Holding
2001 (55th)	Bells Are Ringing	Mitchell Maxwell, Mark Balsam, Victoria Maxwell, Robert Barandes, Mark Goldberg, Anthony R. Russo, James L. Simon, Fred H. Krones, Allen M. Shore and Momentum Productions Inc.
2001 (55th)	Follies	Roundabout Theatre Company, Todd Haimes, Ellen Richard and Julia C. Levy
2001 (55th)	The Rocky Horror Show	Jordan Roth, Christopher Malcolm, Howard Panter, Richard O'Brien and The Rocky Horror Company Ltd.
2002 (56th)
2002 (56th)	Into the Woods	Dodger Theatricals, Stage Holding / Joop van den Ende and TheatreDreams
2002 (56th)	Oklahoma!	Cameron Mackintosh and Royal National Theatre
2003 (57th)
2003 (57th)	Nine	Roundabout Theatre Company, Todd Haimes, Ellen Richard and Julia C. Levy
2003 (57th)	Gypsy	Robert Fox, Ron Kastner, Roger Marino, Michael Watt, Harvey Weinstein and WWLC
2003 (57th)	La bohème	Jeffrey Seller, Kevin McCollum, Emanuel Azenberg, Bazmark Live, Bob and Harvey Weinstein, Korea Pictures / Doyun Seol, J. Sine / I. Pittelman / S. Nederlander and Fox Searchlight Pictures
2003 (57th)	Man of La Mancha	David Stone, Jon B. Platt, Susan Quint Gallin, Sandy Gallin, Seth M. Siegel, USA Ostar Theatricals and Mary Lu Roffe
2004 (58th)
2004 (58th)	Assassins	Roundabout Theatre Company, Todd Haimes, Ellen Richard and Julia C. Levy
2004 (58th)	Big River	Roundabout Theatre Company, Todd Haimes, Ellen Richard, Julia C. Levy, Deaf West Theatre, Ed Waterstreet, Bill O'Brien and Center Theatre Group / Mark Taper Forum
2004 (58th)	Fiddler on the Roof	James L. Nederlander, Stewart F. Lane / Bonnie Comley, Harbor Entertainment, Terry Allen Kramer, Bob Boyett / Lawrence Horowitz and Clear Channel Entertainment
2004 (58th)	Wonderful Town	Roger Berlind, Barry and Fran Weissler, Edwin W. Schloss, Allen Spivak, Clear Channel Entertainment and Harvey Weinstein
2005 (59th)
2005 (59th)	La Cage aux Folles	James L. Nederlander, Clear Channel Entertainment, Kenneth Greenblatt, Terry Allen Kramer and Martin Richards
2005 (59th)	Pacific Overtures	Roundabout Theatre Company, Todd Haimes, Ellen Richard, Julia C. Levy and Gorgeous Entertainment
2005 (59th)	Sweet Charity	Barry and Fran Weissler, Clear Channel Entertainment and Edwin W. Schloss
2006 (60th)
2006 (60th)	The Pajama Game	Roundabout Theatre Company, Todd Haimes, Harold Wolpert, Julia C. Levy, Jeffrey Richards, James Fuld Jr. and Scott Landis
2006 (60th)	Sweeney Todd: The Demon Barber of Fleet Street	Tom Viertel, Steven Baruch, Marc Routh, Richard Frankel, Ambassador Theatre Group, Adam Kenwright and Tulchin/Bartner/Bagert
2006 (60th)	The Threepenny Opera	Roundabout Theatre Company, Todd Haimes, Harold Wolpert and Julia C. Levy
2007 (61st)
2007 (61st)	Company	Marc Routh, Richard Frankel, Tom Viertel, Steven Baruch, Ambassador Theatre Group, Tulchin/Bartner Productions, Darren Bagert and Cincinnati Playhouse in the Park
2007 (61st)	The Apple Tree	Roundabout Theatre Company, Todd Haimes, Harold Wolpert and Julia C. Levy
2007 (61st)	A Chorus Line	Producer: Vienna Waits Productions
2007 (61st)	110 in the Shade	Roundabout Theatre Company, Todd Haimes, Harold Wolpert and Julia C. Levy
2008 (62nd)
2008 (62nd)	Rodgers & Hammesterstein's South Pacific	Lincoln Center Theater, André Bishop, Bernard Gersten and Bob Boyett
2008 (62nd)	Grease	Paul Nicholas and David Ian, Nederlander Presentations Inc., Terry Allen Kramer and Robert Stigwood
2008 (62nd)	Gypsy	Roger Berlind, The Routh-Frankel-Baruch-Viertel Group, Roy Furman, Debra Black, Ted Hartley, Roger Horchow, David Ian, Scott Rudin and Jack Viertel
2008 (62nd)	Sunday in the Park with George	Roundabout Theatre Company, Todd Haimes, Harold Wolpert, Julia C. Levy, Bob Boyett, Debra Black, Jam Theatricals, Stephanie P. McClelland, Stewart F. Lane / Bonnie Comley, Barbara Manocherian / Jennifer Manocherian, Ostar Productions and The Menier Chocolate Factory / David Babani
2009 (63rd)
2009 (63rd)	Hair	The Public Theater, Oskar Eustis, Andrew D. Hamingson, Jeffrey Richards, Jerry Frankel, Gary Goddard Entertainment, Kathleen K. Johnson, Nederlander Productions Inc., Fran Kirmser Productions / Jed Bernstein, Marc Frankel, Broadway Across America, Barbara Manocherian/Wencarlar Productions, JK Productions / Terry Schnuck, Andy Sandberg, Jam Theatricals, The Weinstein Company / Norton Herrick, Jujamcyn Theaters, Joey Parnes and Elizabeth Ireland McCann
2009 (63rd)	Guys and Dolls	Howard Panter and Ambassador Theatre Group, Tulchin/Bartner, Bill Kenwright, Northwater Entertainment, Darren Bagert, Tom Gregory, Nederlander Presentations Inc., David Mirvish, Michael Jenkins / Dallas Summer Musicals, Independent Presenters Network, Olympus Theatricals and Sonia Friedman Productions
2009 (63rd)	Pal Joey	Roundabout Theatre Company, Todd Haimes, Harold Wolpert, Julia C. Levy and Marc Platt
2009 (63rd)	West Side Story	Kevin McCollum, James L. Nederlander, Jeffrey Seller, Terry Allen Kramer, Sander Jacobs, Roy Furman / Jill Furman Willis, Freddy DeMann, Robyn Goodman / Walt Grossman, Hal Luftig, Roy Miller, The Weinstein Company and Broadway Across America

=== 2010s ===
Year	Musical	Nominees
2010 (64th)
2010 (64th)	La Cage aux Folles	Sonia Friedman Productions, David Babani, Barry and Fran Weissler and Edwin W. Schloss, Bob Bartner/Norman Tulchin, Broadway Across America, Matthew Mitchell, Raise the Roof 4, Richard Winkler / Bensinger Taylor / Laudenslager Bergrre, Arelene Scanlan/John O'Boyle, Independent Presenters Network, Olympus Theatricals, Allen Spivak, Jerry Frankel / Bat-Barry Productions, Nederlander Presentations Inc. / Harvey Weinstein and Menier Chocolate Factory
2010 (64th)	Finian's Rainbow	David Richenthal, Jack Viertel, Alan D. Marks, Michael Speyer, Bernard Abrams, David M. Milch, Stephen Moore, Debbie Bisno/Myla Lerner, Jujamcyn Theaters, Melly Garcia, Jamie deRoy, Jon Bierman, Richard Driehaus, Kevin Spirtas, Jay Binder and StageVentures 2009 Limited Partnership
2010 (64th)	A Little Night Music	Tom Viertel, Steven Baruch, Marc Routh, Richard Frankel, The Menier Chocolate Factory, Roger Berlind, David Babani, Sonia Friedman Productions, Andrew Fell, Daryl Roth / Jane Bergere, Harvey Weinstein / Raise the Roof 3, Beverly Bartner/Dancap Productions, Inc., Nica Burns/Max Weitzenhoffer, Eric Falkenstein / Anna Czekaj, Jerry Frankel / Ronald Frankel and James D. Stern / Douglas L. Meyer
2010 (64th)	Ragtime	Kevin McCollum, Roy Furman, Scott Delman, Roger Berlind, Max Cooper, Tom Kirdahy / Devlin Elliott, Jeffrey A. Sine, Stephanie P. McClelland, Roy Miller, Lams Productions, Jana Robbins, Sharon Karmazin, Eric Falkenstein / Morris Berchard, RialtoGals Productions, Independent Presenters Network, Held-Haffner Productions, HRH Foundation, Emanuel Azenberg, John F. Kennedy Center for the Performing Arts, Michael Kaiser and Max Woodward
2011 (65th)
2011 (65th)	Anything Goes	Roundabout Theatre Company, Todd Haimes, Harold Wolpert and Julia C. Levy
2011 (65th)	How to Succeed in Business Without Really Trying	Broadway Across America, Craig Zadan, Neil Meron, Joseph Smith, Michael McCabe, Candy Spelling, Takonkiet Viravan/Scenario Thailand, Hilary A. Williams, Jen Namoff/Fakston Productions, Two Left Feet Productions/Power Arts, Hop Theatricals, LLC / Paul Chau / Daniel Frishwasser / Michael Jackowitz, Michael Speyer and Bernie Abrams / Jacki Barlia Florin and Adam Blanshay / Arlene Scanlan / TBS Service
2012 (66th)
2012 (66th)	Porgy and Bess	Jeffrey Richards, Jerry Frankel, Rebecca Gold, Howard Kagan, Cheryl Wiesenfeld/Brunish Trinchero/Lucio Simons TBC, Joseph & Matthew Deitch, Mark S. Golub and David S. Golub, Terry Schnuck, Freitag Productions/Koenigsberg Filerman, The Leonore S. Gershwin 1987 Trust, Universal Pictures Stage Productions, Ken Mahoney, Judith Resnick, Tulchin/Bartner/ATG, Paper Boy Productions, Christopher Hart, Alden Badway, Broadway Across America, Irene Gandy, Will Trice and American Repertory Theater
2012 (66th)	Evita	Hal Luftig, Scott Sanders Productions, Roy Furman, Yasuhiro Kawana, Allan S. Gordon/Adam S. Gordon, James L. Nederlander, Terry Allen Kramer, Gutterman Fuld Chernoff/Pittsburgh CLO, Thousand Stars Productions, Adam Blanshay, Adam Zotovich, Robert Ahrens, Stephanie P. McClelland, Carole L. Haber, Richardo Hornos, Carol Fineman, Brian Smith, Warren and Jâlé Trepp
2012 (66th)	Follies	John F. Kennedy Center for the Performing Arts, David M. Rubenstein, Michael M. Kaiser, Max A. Woodward, Nederlander Presentations, Inc., Adrienne Arsht, HRH Foundation and Allan Williams
2012 (66th)	Jesus Christ Superstar	The Dodgers and The Really Useful Group, Latitude Link, Tamara and Kevin Kinsella, Pelican Group, Waxman-Dokton, Joe Corcoran, Detsky/Sokolowski/Kassie, Florin-Blanshay-Fan/Broadway Across America, Rich/Caudwell, Shin/Coleman, TheatreDreams North America, LLC, Stratford Shakespeare Festival
2013 (67th)
2013 (67th)	Pippin	Barry and Fran Weissler, Howard and Janet Kagan, Lisa Matlin, Kyodo Tokyo, A&A Gordon/Brunish Trinchero, Tom Smedes/Peter Stern, Broadway Across America, Independent Presenters Network, Norton Herrick, Allen Spivak, Rebecca Gold, Joshua Goodman, Stephen E. McManus, David Robbins/Bryan S. Weingarten, Philip Hagemann/Murray Rosenthal, Jim Kierstead / Carlos Arana / Myla Lerner, Hugh Hayes/Jamie Cesa/Jonathan Reinis, Sharon A. Carr/Patricia R. Klausner, Ben Feldman, Square 1 Theatrics, Wendy Federman/Carl Moellenberg, Bruce Robert Harris/Jack W. Batman, Infinity Theatre Company/Michael Rubenstein, Michael A. Alden/Dale Badway/Ken Mahoney, American Repertory Theater
2013 (67th)	Annie	Arielle Tepper Madover, Roger Horchow, Sally Horchow, Roger Berlind, Roy Furman, Debbie Bisno, Stacey Mindich, James M. Nederlander, Jane Bergère / Daryl Roth and Eva Price/Christina Papagjika
2013 (67th)	The Mystery of Edwin Drood	Roundabout Theatre Company, Todd Haimes, Harold Wolpert and Julia C. Levy
2013 (67th)	Rodgers + Hammerstein's Cinderella	Robyn Goodman, Jill Furman, Stephen Kocis, Edward Walson, Venetian Glass Productions, The Araca Group, Luigi Caiola & Rose Caiola, Roy Furman, Walt Grossman, Peter May/Sanford Robertson, Glass Slipper Productions LLC/Eric Schmidt, Ted Liebowitz/James Spry, Blanket Fort Productions and Center Theatre Group
2014 (68th)
2014 (68th)	Hedwig and the Angry Inch	David Binder, Jayne Baron Sherman, Barbara Whitman, Latitude Link, Patrick Catullo, Raise the Roof, Paula Marie Black, Colin Callender, Ruth Hendel, Sharon Karmazin, Martian Entertainment, Stacey Mindich, Eric Schnall and The Shubert Organization
2014 (68th)	Les Misérables	Cameron Mackintosh
2014 (68th)	Violet	Roundabout Theatre Company, Todd Haimes, Harold Wolpert, Julia C. Levy, Sydney Beers, Amy Sherman-Palladino and Daniel Palladino, David Mirvish, Barry and Fran Weissler, Elizabeth Armstrong and Mary Jo and Ted Shen
2015 (69th)
2015 (69th)	The King and I	Lincoln Center Theater, André Bishop, Adam Siegel, Hattie K. Jutagir and Ambassador Theatre Group
2015 (69th)	On the Town	Howard and Janet Kagan, Severn Partners Entertainment, Bruce Robert Harris and Jack W. Batman, Paula Marie Black, Nigel Lythgoe, Michael J. Moritz Jr., Mahoney/Alden/Badway, Ambassador Theatre Group, Margie and Bryan Weingarten, Kim Schall, Michael Rubenstein, Terry/Louise/Chris Lingner, Brunish & Trinchero, Stephanie Rosenberg, Laruffa & Hinderliter, Rubinstein/Handleman, Lizbeth Bintz, Riki Kane Larimer, 24 Hour Adventure Production, A&A Gordon, Matt Ross / Ben Feldman / Pamela Cooper and Barrington Stage Company
2015 (69th)	On the Twentieth Century	Roundabout Theatre Company, Todd Haimes, Harold Wolpert, Julia C. Levy and Sydney Beers
2016 (70th)
2016 (70th)	The Color Purple	Scott Sanders Productions, Roy Furman, Oprah Winfrey, David Babani, Tom Siracusa, Caiola Productions, James Fantaci, Ted Liebowitz, Stephanie P. McClelland, James L. Nederlander, Darren Bagert, Candy Spelling, Adam Zotovich, Eric Falkenstein / Morris Berchard, Just for Laughs Theatricals / Tanya Link Productions, Adam S. Gordon, Jam Theatricals, Kelsey Grammer, Independent Presenters Network, Carol Fineman, Sandy Block, Quincy Jones and Menier Chocolate Factory Productions
2016 (70th)	Fiddler on the Roof	Jeffrey Richards, Jam Theatricals, Louise Gund, Jerry Frankel, Broadway Across America, Rebecca Gold, Stephanie P. McClelland, Barbara Freitag & Company / Catherine Schreiber & Company, Greenleaf Productions, Orin Wolf, Patty Baker, Caiola Productions, The Nederlander Organization, Gabrielle Palitz, Kit Seidel, TenTex Partners, Edward M. Kaufmann, Soffer/Namoff Entertainment, Healy Theatricals, Clear Channel Spectacolor, Jessica Genick and Will Trice
2016 (70th)	She Loves Me	Roundabout Theatre Company, Todd Haimes, Harold Wolpert, Julia C. Levy and Sydney Beers
2016 (70th)	Spring Awakening	Ken Davenport, Cody Lassen, Hunter Arnold, David J. Kurs, Deaf West Theatre, Carl Daikeler, Sandi Moran, Chockstone Pictures, Caiola Productions, Marguerite Hoffman, H. Richard Hopper, LearyTodd Productions, Markoltop Productions, R&D Theatricals, Brian Cromwell Smith, Invisible Wall Productions and Monica Horan Rosenthal
2017 (71st)
2017 (71st)	Hello, Dolly!	Scott Rudin, Roy Furman, James L. Nederlander, Eli Bush, Universal Stage Productions, Roger Berlind, William Berlind, Heni Koenigsberg, Terry Allen Kramer, Seth A. Goldstein, John Gore Organization, Daryl Roth, The Araca Group, Len Blavatnik, Eric Falkenstein, Ruth Hendel, Independent Presenters Network, Peter May, Jay Alix & Una Jackman, Jane Bergère, Scott M. Delman, Wendy Federman, Stephanie P. McClelland, Anita Waxman, Al Nocciolino, Spring Sirkin, Barbara Freitag, John Mara, Jr. & Benjamin Simpson, Joey Parnes, Sue Wagner and John Johnson
2017 (71st)	Falsettos	Lincoln Center Theater, André Bishop, Adam Siegel, Hattie K. Jutagir and Jujamcyn Theaters
2017 (71st)	Miss Saigon	Cameron Mackintosh
2018 (72nd)
2018 (72nd)	Once on This Island	Ken Davenport, Hunter Arnold, Carl Daikeler, Roy Putrino, Broadway Strategic Return Fund, Sandi Moran, Caiola Productions, H. Richard Hopper, Diego Kolankowsky, Brian Cromwell Smith, Ron Kastner, Rob Kolson, Judith Manocherian/Kevin Lyle, Jay Alix/Una Jackman/Jeff Wise, WitzEnd Productions/Jeff Grove/Wishnie-Strasberg, Mark Ferris/Michelle Riley/Marie Stevenson, Silva Theatrical Group/Jesse McKendry/Dr. Mojgan Fajiram, Conor Bagley/Brendan C. Tetro/Invisible Wall Productions, Silverwalport Productions/Tyler Mount/Ushkowitzlatimer Productions, The Harbert Family/Reilly Hickey, Keith Cromwell/Red Mountain Theatre Company and 42nd.Club/The Yonnone Family/Island Productions
2018 (72nd)	Carousel	Roy Furman, Scott Rudin, Barry Diller, Edward Walson, Universal Theatrical Group, Benjamin Lowy, Eli Bush, James L. Nederlander, Candy Spelling, John Gore Organization, Peter May, Ronnie Lee, Sid & Ruth Lapidus, Stephanie P. McClelland, Sandy Robertson, Caiola Productions, Len Blavatnik, Dominion Ventures, SHN Theatres, The Araca Group, Patty Baker, Al Nocciolino, Darlene Marcos Shiley, Julie Boardman & Marc David Levine, Jennifer Fischer & Olympus Theatricals, Candia Fisher & Allen L. Stevens, Jon Jashni & Matthew Baer, Thomas S. Perakos & Jim Fantaci, Wendy Federman & Heni Koenigsberg, Bruce Robert Harris & Jack W. Batman, John Thomas, Joey Parnes, Sue Wagner and John Johnson
2018 (72nd)	My Fair Lady	Lincoln Center Theater, André Bishop, Adam Siegel, Hattie K. Jutagir and Nederlander Presentations Inc.
2019 (73rd)
2019 (73rd)	Oklahoma!	Eva Price, Level Forward, Abigail Disney, Barbara Manocherian & Carl Moellenberg, James L. Nederlander, David Mirvish, Mickey Liddell & Robert Ahrens, BSL Enterprises & MagicSpace Entertainment, Berlind Productions, John Gore Organization, Cornice Productions, Bard Fisher/R. Gold, LAMF/J. Geller, T. Narang/ZKM Media, R/F/B/V Group, Araca / IPN, St. Ann's Warehouse, Tamar Climan and Bard Summerscape
2019 (73rd)	Kiss Me, Kate	Roundabout Theatre Company, Todd Haimes, Julia C. Levy, Sydney Beers and Steve Dow

=== 2020s ===
Year	Musical	Nominees
2020 (74th)	—N/a (Note: The category was not given for the 2019–20 Broadway season due to the impact of the COVID-19 pandemic. While a revival of West Side Story had opened on February 20, 2020, and revivals of Caroline, or Change and Company were expected to open in April and March, respectively, the official eligibility cutoff date for Tony consideration was later changed to February 19, 2020, shortly under a month before Broadway shut down. Because West Side Story opened too late and neither Caroline, or Change nor Company had opened yet, no musical revival production was considered eligible for the season.)	
2022 (75th)
2022 (75th)	Company	Elliott & Harper Productions, The Shubert Organization, Catherine Schreiber, Nederlander Presentations Inc., Crossroads Live, Annapurna Theatre, Hunter Arnold, No Guarantees, Jon B. Platt, Michael Watt, John Gore Organization, Tim Levy, Grove / REG, Hornos / Mollenberg, Levine / Federman - Adler, Beard / Merrie / Robbins, LD Entertainment / Madison Wells Live, Benjamin Lowy / Roben Alive, Daryl Roth / Tom Tuft, Salmira Productions / Caiola Productions, Aged in Wood / Lee / Sachs, Berinstein -/Lane / 42nd.club, Boyett / Miller / Hodges / Kukieiski, Finn / DeVito / Independent Presenters Network, Armstrong / Ross / Gilad / Rogowsky, Boardman / Koenigsberg / Zell / Seriff, Concord Theatricals / Scott Sanders Productions / Abrams / May, deRoy / Brunish / Jenen / Rubin, Fakston Productions / Sabi / Lerner / Ketner, Maggio / Abrams/Hopkins / Tackel, Levy & Chauviere and Jujamcyn Theaters
2022 (75th)	Caroline, or Change	Roundabout Theatre Company, Todd Haimes, Julia C. Levy, Sydney Beers, Steve Dow, Lot's Wife, Hunter Arnold, Caiola Productions/Willette & Manny Klausner, Chambers-D'Angora / Joseph and Alyson Graci
2022 (75th)	The Music Man	Barry Diller, David Geffen, Kate Horton and Fictionhouse
2023 (76th)
2023 (76th)	Parade	Seaview, Ambassador Theatre Group Productions, Alex Levy, Kevin Ryan, Eric & Marsi Gardiner, Interscope & Immersive Records, Erica Lynn Schwartz, Creative Partners Productions, Marcia Goldberg, John Gore Organization, Cynthia Stroum, Tom Tuft, Benjamin Simpson, Nathan Vernon, Brian and Nick Ginsberg, Ruth and Stephen Hendel, Roth-Manella Productions, Chutzpah Productions, 42nd.club, Ahava 72 Productions, The Andryc Brothers, The Array, At Rise Creative, Caiola Jenen Productions, Coles Achilles, deRoy Brunish Productions, Fakston Productions, Federman Batchelder, Level Forward, Pencil Factory Productions, Renard Lynch, Robin Merrie, Rubin Stuckelman, Runyonland Sussman, Kristin Caskey, Mike Isaacson, Bee Carrozzini and New York City Center
2023 (76th)	Camelot	Lincoln Center Theater, André Bishop, Adam Siegel and Naomi Grabel
2023 (76th)	Into the Woods	Jujamcyn Theaters, Jordan Roth, New York City Center, Daryl Roth, Hunter Arnold, Concord Theatricals, Nicole Eisenberg, Jessica R. Jenen, Michael Cassel Group, Kevin Ryan, ShowTown Productions, Armstrong, Gold & Ross and Nicole Kastrinos
2023 (76th)	Sweeney Todd: The Demon Barber of Fleet Street	Jeffrey Seller, Bob Boyett, Diana DiMenna and Plate Spinner Productions / Aaron Glick, Eastern Standard Time, Roy Furman, Thomas Kail, Jim Kierstead / Benjamin Leon IV, TourDForce Theatrical, Maggie Brohn and Andy Jones
2024 (77th)
2024 (77th)	Merrily We Roll Along	Sonia Friedman Productions, David Babani, Patrick Catullo, Jeff Romley, Debbie Bisno, Lang Entertainment Group, OHenry Productions, Winkler & Smalberg, Stephanie P. McClelland, Timothy Bloom, Creative Partners Productions, Eastern Standard Time, Fakston Productions, Marc David Levine, No Guarantees, Ted & Mary Jo Shen, Gilad Rogowsky, Playing Field, Key to the City Productions, Richard Batchelder / Trunfio Ryan, FineWomen Productions / Henry R. Muñoz III, Thomas Swayne / Lamar Richardson, Abrams Corr / Mary Maggio, Osh Ashruf / Brenner-Ivey, Craig Balsam / PBL Productions, deRoy DiMauro Productions / Medley Houlihan, Andrew Diamond / Katler-Solomon Productions, Dodge Hall Productions / Carl Moellenberg, Friedman Simpson / Vernon Stuckelman, William Frisbie / J.J. Powell, Robert Greenblatt / Jonathan Littman, Cleveland O'Neal III / Tom Tuft, Roth-Manella Productions / Seaview and New York Theatre Workshop
2024 (77th)	Cabaret at the Kit Kat Club	ATG Productions, Underbelly, Gavin Kalin Productions, Hunter Arnold, Smith & Brant Theatricals, Wessex Grove, Julie Boardman, Tom Smedes, Peter Stern, Heather Shields, Caiola Productions, Kate Cannova, Adam Blanshay Productions & Nicolas Talar, Aleri Entertainment, Alex Levy Productions, Bunny Rabbit Productions, D'Angora Padgett Productions, Cyrene Esposito, David Treatman, Eddie Redmayne, The Array IV, Bad Robot Live, BlueJay Productions, Grace Street Creative Group, Iocane Productions, Jim Kierstead, Marco Santarelli, Tokyo Broadcasting System Television, George Waud, Yonge Street Theatricals, Federman Koenigsberg Productions / Sara Beth Zivitz, Tina Marie Casamento / Jennifer Johns, M. Kilburg Reedy / Tilman Kemmler, Greenspan Proffer, Sally Bowles / Kat Kit 4, Patty Baker / Matthew Christopher Pietras, Broadway Strategic Return Fund / Red Mountain Theatre Company, Evan Coles / The Cohn Sisters, Nolan Doran / Fakston Productions, Epic Theatricals / Jeffrey Grove, Jessica Goldman Foung / Andrew Paradis, William Frisbie Tilted Marguerite Steed Hoffman / Willette & Manny Klausner, Vasi Laurence / Stephen C. Byrd, Brian & Dayna Lee / City Cowboy Productions, Maybe This Time / 3D Productions, Nothing Ventured Productions / Theatre Producers of Color, Perfectly Marvelous / Catherine Schreiber & Co., Second Act / Freedom Theatricals, SSP Holdings / Todd & Bronwyn Bradley, Two Ladies / Nicole Eisenberg, Ilana Waldenberg / W Stage Productions, The Wolf Pack / Burnt Umber Productions and The Shubert Organization
2024 (77th)	Gutenberg! The Musical!	Ambassador Theatre Group, Patrick Catullo, Bad Robot Live, Seth A. Goldstein, Isaac Robert Hurwitz, Runyonland Productions, Elizabeth Armstrong, Timothy Bloom, Larry Lelli, Alchemation, The Council, Crescent Road, Wendy Federman, Marcia Goldberg, Hariton deRoy, LD Entertainment, James L. Nederlander, Al Nocciolino, Spencer Ross, Independent Presenters Network, Medley Houlihan / Score 3 Partners, Tryptyk Studios / Iris Smith, Jonathan Demar / Griffin Dohr, Andrew Diamond / Alexander Donnelly, Futurehome Productions / Koenigsberg Subhedar, Roy Gabay / Nicole Eisenberg, Jessica R. Jenen / Linda B. Rubin, Daniel Powell / Amplify Pictures, Jeremy Wein / Walport Productions, Kristin Caskey, Mike Isaacson and Bee Carrozzini
2024 (77th)	The Who's Tommy	Stephen Gabriel, Ira Pittelman, Sue Gilad & Larry Rogowsky, Mary Maggio & Scott Abrams, Tom Tuft and Glenn Fuhrman, Batman Harris / Elliott Cornelious, Laura Matalon / Spencer Waller, Richard Winkler, Sheldon Stone, Firemused Productions / Stone Arch Theatricals, LeonoffFedermanWolosky Productions / Koenigsberg Batchelder, Roy Putrino / Narang Moran, Rich Martino, Aged in Wood / Lee Sachs, Paul and Margaret Liljenquist, R & R Productions, Marla McNally Phillips, Merrie Robin, O'Neill Snow, Work Light Productions, Nederlander Presentations, Independent Presenters Network, John Gore Organization, Palomino Performing Arts, Wavelength Productions, Robert Nederlander Jr., Botwin Ignal Dawson, Jamie deRoy, Betsy Dollinger, Stacey Woolf Feinberg, Gold Weinstein, Tyce Green, Jenen Rubin, Jim Kierstead, Marco Santarelli, Nancy Timmers, Thomas B. McGrath, Olympus Theatricals and Goodman Theatre
2025 (78th)
2025 (78th)	Sunset Blvd.	The Jamie Lloyd Company, ATG Productions, Michael Harrison for Lloyd Webber Harrison Musicals, Gavin Kalin Productions, Wessex Grove, Christopher Ketner, Aleri Entertainment, Sonia Friedman, Roth-Manella Productions, Winkler Smalberg, Caitlin Clements, 42nd.club, Abrams Johnson, Aron on Broadway, The Array V, At Rise Creative, Bad Robot Live, Craig Balsam, Greg Berlanti, Boardman Cannova Productions, Bob Boyett, Burnt Umber Productions, Patrick Catullo, Crane McGill Trunfio, Core Four Productions, Nicole Eisenberg, The Factor Gavin Partnership, Federman Jenen Koenigsberg, Forshaw Turchin, John Gore, Jake Hine, LAMF Secret Hideout, Jack Lane, Lang Entertainment Group, Lelli Armstrong, Alex Levy, Luftig Reade St. Kawana, Mary Maggio, Jay Marcus, Stephanie P. McClelland, James L. Nederlander, No Guarantees Productions, P3 Productions, Thomas Steven Perakos, Pam Hurst-Della Pietra, Shari Redstone, Regian Davison Buckman, Sand & Snow Entertainment, SBK Productions, The Shubert Organization, Smedes Stern Productions, Tilted, Willowrow Entertainment and WMKlausner
2025 (78th)	Floyd Collins	Lincoln Center Theater, André Bishop, Adam Siegel, Naomi Grabel, Ira Weitzman, Creative Partners Productions, Mark Cortale and Charles D. Urstadt
2025 (78th)	Gypsy	Tom Kirdahy, Mara Isaacs, Kevin Ryan, Diane Scott Carter, Wendy Federman & Heni Koenigsberg, Roy Furman, Viajes Miranda, Kerry Washington, Peter May, Thomas M. Neff, Cynthia J. Tong, Adam Hyndman, A Perfect Team Productions, Cue to Cue Productions, Da Silva Stone, DMQR Productions, Grant Spark Productions, Marguerite Steed Hoffman, KarmaHendelMcCabe, James L. Nederlander, Janet and Marvin Rosen, Archer Entertainment, Dale Franzen, 42nd.club, Rob Acton, All That JJAS, Mike Audet, Patty Baker, Cohen Soto, Concord Theatricals, Creative Partners Productions, Crumhale Taylor Productions, Ken Davenport, DJD Productions, Flipswitch Entertainment, Frankly Spoken Productions, Roy Gabay, Happy Recap Productions, Sandra and Howard Hoffen, John Gore Organization, Johnson Maggio Productions, Willette and Manny Klausner, Kors Le Pere Theatricals, LaCroix Eisenberg, David Lai, Little Lamb Productions, Bill and Sally Martin, Mohari Media, No Guarantees Productions, Pam Hurst-Della Pietra and Stephen Della Pietra, Regian Davison, Lamar Richardson, Patti and Michael Roberts, RTK Rose, Score 3 Partners, Silva Theatrical Group, Some People, Stone Arch Theatricals, Storyboard Entertainment LE, Mary and Jay Sullivan, The Adams Hendel Group, The Array VI, The Broadway Investor's Club, Theatre Producers of Color, Tom Tuft, TreAmici Gooding, Waiting in the Wings Productions, Whitney Williams, Sara Beth Zivitz, Jamila Ponton Bragg and The Industry Standard Group
2025 (78th)	Pirates! The Penzance Musical	Roundabout Theatre Company, Todd Haimes, Scott Ellis, Sydney Beers, Christopher Nave, Steven Showalter, James L. Nederlander, Fran and Paul Turner and ATG Productions / Gavin Kalin Productions
2026 (79th)
2026 (79th)	Ragtime	Lincoln Center Theater, Lear deBessonet, Mike Schleifer, Bartlett Sher, Nicole Kastrinos, Naomi Grabel, Maria Manuela Goyanes, Tom Kirdahy, Kevin Ryan, Robert Greenblatt, Lamar Richardson, Thomas M. Neff, Roy and Jill Furman, Stephanie P. McClelland, Michael Page, Acton Rothschild Productions/Willette and Manny Klausner, Alexander-Taylor Deignan/Jay and Mary Sullivan, D'Angora Padgett Productions/Janet and Marvin Rosen, Maggio Lane/Rubin Bolosh and Peter May/Coluzzi Cohen
2026 (79th)	Cats: The Jellicle Ball	Michael Harrison, Mike Bosner, Lloyd Webber Harrison Musicals, Cynthia Erivo, Get Lifted, LaChanze, Jeremy Pope, Law Roach, Lena Waithe, Origin Story Productions, Miranda Gohh, George Strus, William Berlind, Timothy Bloom/Martinez Grimmett Productions/Drama Club Productions, Adam Kantor & Charly Jaffe, Alex Levy & Shari Redstone, Kevin Cahoon, AEG Presents/Jay Marciano, D'Angora Padgett Productions/Open Horizon, Gavin Kalin Productions, Jake Hine, Nederlander Presentations, Scott Mauro Entertainment/Leachman Feigelson Productions, Lindsay Holmes, Sean Nyberg, MeoWZ Productions, Nelson & Tao, TFLO Theatricals, artEquity Acton, Bob Boyett, Chimney Town, Cloth Fair Productions, Crooked Letter, DJD Productions, DudaMarcus, EK Productions, Lian Bloch Gill, Grace Street Creative, Lisa Hane, Harris Lanedo Productions, Hill Steinfast, John Gore Organization, Key to the City Productions, Willette Klausner, KLive Entertainment, L+E+N+Z Entertainment, LBH Productions, Christina Liceaga, LTJOF Productions, Lucky Tea Productions, Gates McCaffrey, Mount Caperton Productions, Mumby Foung, Mark Musico, Debbie Ohanian, Ryan R. Ratelle, Adam Riemer, Second Set, The Shubert Organization, The Brians, The Theater Offensive, Theatre Producers of Color, Andy Jones and The Perelman Performing Arts Center/PAC NYC
2026 (79th)	The Rocky Horror Show	Roundabout Theatre Company, Todd Haimes, Scott Ellis, Sydney Beers, Christopher Nave, Rebecca Habel, Trafalgar Entertainment and The Dodgers

== Multiple wins ==
2 Wins

- Anything Goes^{^}
- Company^{*}
- The King and I^{*}
- La Cage aux Folles*
- Porgy and Bess^{^}

^{*} Original Broadway production also won Best Musical.

^{^} The original productions of Anything Goes (opened in 1934) and Porgy and Bess (opened in 1935) had their runs on Broadway before the first Tony Awards ceremony in 1947. Both productions opened at the Alvin Theatre, now the Neil Simon Theatre.

== Multiple nominations ==
4 nominations

- Gypsy

3 Nominations

- Cabaret
- Company
- Fiddler on the Roof
- Guys and Dolls
- Peter Pan
- Sweeney Todd: The Demon Barber of Fleet Street

2 Nominations

- Annie
- Anything Goes
- Camelot
- Carousel
- Follies
- Grease
- Hello, Dolly!
- How to Succeed in Business Without Really Trying
- Into the Woods
- Jesus Christ Superstar
- The King and I
- Kiss Me, Kate
- La Cage aux Folles
- The Music Man
- My Fair Lady
- Oklahoma!
- The Pirates of Penzance
- Ragtime
- The Rocky Horror Show
- She Loves Me
- Sweet Charity
- The Threepenny Opera
- West Side Story

== Works that have won both Best Musical and Best Revival of a Musical ==
- Kiss Me, Kate 1949/2000
- South Pacific 1950/2008
- Guys and Dolls 1951/1992
- The King and I 1952/1996 & 2015
- The Pajama Game 1955/2006
- Hello, Dolly! 1964/2017
- Fiddler on the Roof 1965/1991
- Cabaret 1967/1998
- Company 1971/2007 & 2022
- 42nd Street 1981/2001 (shortest timeframe between wins 20 years)
- Nine 1982/2003
- La Cage aux Folles 1984/2005 & 2010
- Sunset Boulevard 1994/2025

== See also ==
- Tony Award for Best Musical
- Tony Award for Best Revival
- Tony Award for Best Revival of a Play
- Drama Desk Award for Outstanding Revival of a Musical
- Laurence Olivier Award for Best New Musical
- List of Tony Award-nominated productions
