= Alex Levy =

Alex Levy may refer to:

- Alex Levy (producer) (born 1986 or 1987), American speechwriter and theater producer
- Alex Levy, one of the lead characters in The Morning Show, an American drama television series
- Alexander Lévy (born 1990), French professional golfer
- Alexander Levy (architect), Israeli architect who designed Pagoda House
