= David Stone (producer) =

American theater and film producer (born 1966)

David Stone is a leading American Theater Producer.

== Personal life ==
Stone was born in Brooklyn, New York on August 14, 1966, and raised in Marlboro Township, New Jersey. Stone married Michael Seelbach in 2014.

== Education ==
Stone graduated Valedictorian from Marlboro High School in 1984. He received a B.A from The University of Pennsylvania, from which he graduated Phi Beta Kappa in 1988.

== Career ==
Stone is a Broadway and Off-Broadway producer, most notably on the international Blockbuster musical, Wicked. He also produced the two-part film adaptation of the musical.

He had his first contact with the theatre business through an internship at Jujamcyn Theaters. Later he worked with Broadway producers Fran and Barry Weissler before he had his first own production with the 1993 off-Broadway hit Family Secrets.

Stone is a longtime member of the Executive Committee of the Board of Governors of The Broadway League. He also serves on the boards of Broadway Cares/Equity Fights AIDS and the Second Stage Theatre Advisory Board, as well as being a Prince Fellowship Mentor. He has lectured at the Juilliard School, New York University, Yale University, Columbia University and the University of Pennsylvania.

== Charitable Work ==
Stone has been involved with supporting several charities, including V-Day, The Broadway Green Alliance, The Atlantic Theater Company, The Great Adventure Grants, Broadway Advocacy Coalition, and Black Theater United.

== Productions ==
- 1993: Family Secrets (Off-Broadway)
- 1994: What's Wrong With This Picture? (Broadway)
- 1996: Full Gallop (Off-Broadway)
- 1996: The Santaland Diaries (Off-Broadway
- 1997: The Diary of Anne Frank (Broadway)
- 1999: The Vagina Monologues (Off-Broadway)
- 1999: Fully Committed (Off-Broadway)
- 2002: Man of La Mancha (Broadway)
- 2003: Wicked (Broadway)
- 2005: The 25th Annual Putnam County Spelling Bee (Broadway)
- 2006: Three Days of Rain (Broadway)
- 2009: Next to Normal (Broadway)
- 2014: If/Then (Broadway)
- 2017: War Paint (Broadway)
- 2018: The Boys in the Band (Broadway)
- 2022: Topdog/Underdog (Broadway)
- 2022: Kimberly Akimbo (musical) (Broadway)
- 2024: Wicked (musical) (Motion Picture)
- 2025: Purpose (play) (Broadway)
- 2025: Next to Normal (Filmed Live Capture)
- 2025: Wicked: For Good (Motion Picture)

== Awards ==
- 1998: Tony Award for Best Revival of a Play for The Diary of Anne Frank (Nominee)
- 2003: Tony Award for Best Revival of a Musical for Man of La Mancha (Nominee)
- 2003: Drama Desk Award for Outstanding Revival of a Musical for Man of La Mancha (Nominee)
- 2004: Tony Award for Best Musical for Wicked (Nominee)
- 2004: Drama Desk Award for Best Musical for Wicked (Winner)
- 2005: Drama Desk Award for Best Musical for The 25th Annual Putnam County Spelling Bee (Nominee)
- 2005: Tony Award for Best Musical for The 25th Annual Putnam County Spelling Bee (Nominee)
- 2009: Tony Award for Best Musical for Next to Normal (Nominee)
- 2019: Tony Award for Best Revival of a Play for The Boys in the Band (Winner)
- 2023: Tony Award for Best Musical for Kimberly Akimbo (Winner)
- 2023: Tony Award for Best Revival of a Play for Topdog/Underdog (Winner)
- 2025: Drama Desk Award for Outstanding Play for Purpose (Winner)
- 2025: Tony Award for Best Play for Purpose (Winner)
