= The Producer's Perspective =

The Producer's Perspective is a theater blog written and founded by Broadway producer Ken Davenport that was launched in October 2007.

== History ==
Davenport founded The Producer's Perspective in 2007, writing the first post, "If a Producer Talks Out Loud in His Office and No One is There to Hear It..." The blog provides an inside look into Broadway, Off-Broadway, and the New York theater industry, as well as the entertainment industry in general.

Since its founding, The Producer's Perspective has discussed topics such as Davenport's Broadway and Off-Broadway productions, theatrical unions such as Actors' Equity Association and Local One IATSE, how to raise money for a theater production, Broadway ticket prices, and more. Additionally, Davenport used The Producer's Perspective to launch his crowdfunding campaign for the 2013 Broadway revival of Godspell, the first crowdfunded Broadway show. Blog readers and fans of the show were able to find information about investing in the production on The Producer's Perspective.

In 2015, Davenport launched The Producer's Perspective Podcast, a podcast on which he interviews Broadway and theater professionals. Guests have included Ben Brantley, chief drama critic of the New York Times, Jordan Roth, president of Jujamcyn Theaters, lyricist Tim Rice, and director Diane Paulus.
