= Jack W. Batman =

American theatre producer (1944–2025)

- Born: June 8, 1944; Camden, New Jersey, U.S.
- Died: August 1, 2025 (aged 81); Englewood, New Jersey, U.S.
- Education: La Salle College
- Occupation: Theatre producer

Jack W. Batman (June 8, 1944 – August 1, 2025) was an American theatre producer.

== Life and work ==
Batman was born in Camden, New Jersey, on June 8, 1944, to Ralph Batman and Kathryn Wallace.

In 1969, he moved to New York City and began working in the mail room of the William Morris Agency. Throughout his career, he produced a number of productions, including Pippin, On the Town, and Carousel.

In 2013, he won a Tony Award for Best Revival of a Musical for Pippin.

Batman died in Englewood, New Jersey on August 1, 2025, at the age of 81, after suffering from pancreatic cancer.
