= Morris Berchard =

Canadian theatre producer

Morris Berchard is a Canadian theatre producer.

== Early life and education ==
Berchard was born in Winnipeg, Manitoba. He studied psychology and sociology at the University of Manitoba, earning a BA in 1976.

== Career ==
Berchard worked as the Executive Vice-president and Managing Partner of Warren Shepell Consultants Corp. from 1982 to 2005. The company provides mental health counselling to employees and their families working in corporations and organizations in North America and throughout the world.

In 2001 Berchard set up Hot Feat USA Ltd, a company devoted to investing in plays and musicals. These plays and musicals are produced on Broadway and off-Broadway.

In 2015 Berchard established Hot Feat Canada Ltd (HFCL). The mandate of HFCL is to foster and develop new Canadian theatrical works, with an emphasis on musical theatre, with a view to creating greater opportunities beyond the Canadian borders.

== Production history ==
=== Plays ===
- The Last Sunday in June (Off-Broadway: April 2003).
- The Little Dog Laughed (Broadway opening night: 13 November 2006).
- Impressionism (Broadway opening night: 12 March 2009).
- Master Class (Broadway opening night: 14 June 2011; West End: January 2012).
- The Performers (Broadway opening night: 14 November 2012).
- It's Only a Play (Broadway opening night: 9 October 2014).

Hand to God: a new American Play (Broadway opening night: 7 April 2015; West End: 10 February 2016).

=== Musicals ===
- Bat Boy the musical (Toronto opening night: 9 February 2009).
- Ragtime (Broadway opening night: 15 November 2009).
- Something Rotten! (Broadway opening night: 7 June 2015).
- Ride the Cyclone. Originally developed and created with Victoria's Atomic Vaudeville, first produced by Intrepid Theatre. The work was then presented as part of the SummerWorks Performance Festival in Toronto. This moved to Toronto's Theatre Passe Muraille and a subsequent cross-Canada tour. RTC received its American Premiere in September - November 2015 at Chicago Shakespeare Theater. It was directed by Rachel Rockwell who won a Jeff Award for Ride the Cyclone in the category of Director, Best Musical The MCC Theater presented Ride the Cyclone as an Off-Broadway production from November to December 2016, directed again by Rockwell
- The Color Purple (Broadway opening night: 10 December 2015).
- Counting Sheep (Toronto, May 26-June 5, 2016). Immersive theatre piece sung in traditional Ukrainian polyphony.
- Counting Sheep (Edinburgh, August 4–28, 2016).

== Awards ==
Berchard co-produced the Broadway revival of the musical The Color Purple which won a Tony Award in 2016 for Best revival of a Musical

In 2016 he took the Lemon Bucket Orkestra production of Counting Sheep to the Edinburgh Fringe Festival, where it won several awards including the Amnesty Freedom of Expression Award, Highly Commended.

=== Nominations ===
- The Color Purple (nominee) - 2016 Drama Desk Award Outstanding Revival of a Musical or Revue
- Something Rotten (nominee) - 2015 Tony Award Best Musical
- Something Rotten (nominee) - 2015 Drama Desk Award Outstanding Musical
- Hand to God (nominee) - 2015 Tony Award Best Play
- Ragtime (nominee) - 2010 Tony Award Best Revival of a Musical
- Ragtime (nominee) - 2010 Drama Desk Award Outstanding Revival of a Musical
- The Little Dog Laughed - 2007 Tony Award Best Play
