= Steven Roth =

American billionaire businessperson

Steve Roth
- Born: 1941 (age 84–85)
- Education: Dartmouth College (BA, MBA)
- Known for: Founder of Vornado Realty Trust
- Spouse: Daryl Roth
- Children: 2, including Jordan Roth

Steven Roth (born 1941) is an American real estate investor, the founder, chairman, and CEO of Vornado Realty Trust, the largest commercial landlord in New York City. He is also co-founder and managing general partner of Interstate Properties, and chairman and chief executive officer of Alexander's.

== Early life and education ==
Roth was born to a Jewish family, the son of Fred and Virginia Roth. He graduated from DeWitt Clinton High School in the Bronx. In 1962, Roth graduated with an B.A. from Dartmouth College and in 1963, he graduated with a M.B.A. from the Tuck School of Business at Dartmouth.

== Career ==
In 1964, with $250,000 in seed money from real estate investor David Mandelbaum, he formed Interstate Properties, a three-person partnership (Roth, Mandelbaum, and Russell Wight Jr.) tasked with purchasing, renovating, and leasing shopping centers with Roth as managing partner. He repaid Mandelbaum within a year. In 1979, Interstate purchased an interest in the New Jersey discount appliance chain, Two Guys and later gained control of its parent company Vornado, a former fan manufacturer (purchased by Two Guys in 1959 to utilize its tax loss carryforwards) and dissolved the chain, turning the stores into strip malls. His efforts were very successful and in 1980, he founded the New York-based real estate investment trust Vornado Realty Trust. In 1993, Roth took Vornado Realty Trust public. In 1995, Vornado purchased a controlling interest in Alexander's—the former retailer that had declared bankruptcy in 1992—for $54.8 million from Citicorp, adding Alexander's substantial real estate holdings to his existing portfolio.

In the 1980s, Donald Trump bought the West Side Yards, an abandoned railroad yard along the Hudson River in midtown Manhattan, but in the 1990s was forced by his bankers to sell 70% to a group of Hong Kong investors. They developed the site, then sold it in 2005, spending the proceeds on 1290 Sixth Avenue and a San Francisco skyscraper, with Trump receiving 30% ownership of both. The Hong Kong investors then sold their share to Roth, making Roth and Trump business partners.

In 1997, marking its first major acquisition outside of strip malls, Vornado purchased seven Midtown office buildings with 4 million square feet from Bernard H. Mendik for $656 million. In 1998, they purchased 20 more office buildings in Manhattan for $1.7 billion, including One Penn Plaza.

Roth's companies had past involvement in the Alexander's deal with Trump and with Jared Kushner, Kushner's father and the Kushner family's real estate business. Jared announced sale of his interests to his family when accepting a senior Trump White House appointment in January 2017. Vornado's involvement with the Kushner family in 666 Fifth Avenue continued as of March 2017. Trump and Roth also co-own 1290 Sixth Avenue, an office tower containing 2.1 million square feet office. Trump owns 30%, while Roth owns 30%. It is the second largest property in Vornado's New York portfolio.

As of 2016, Vornado owned more than 50 properties in New York City, covering 23.5 million square feet, making it the largest commercial landlord in New York City. In 2017, Roth was paid $2 million in dividends on shares in firms that he does not own. Reporting on this payout, Crains New York noted that “Vornado is one of at least 10 New York companies that pay executives dividends on shares they don’t own,” a form of compensation that exists “because companies regularly grant executives restricted shares that don’t vest for several years.”

The Associated Press reported in June 2017 that Vornado was one of three finalists for a $1.7 billion contract to build a new headquarters building in Washington D.C. for the FBI. Critics, noting Roth's role as a Trump infrastructure advisor and a consultant with the White House Office of American Innovation, led by Jared Kushner, charged that any government contract with Vornado would represent a conflict of interest.

In July 2017, Roth advised U.S. Transportation Secretary Elaine Chao not to cancel construction of the Gateway Project, which would link New Jersey with Penn Station in Manhattan. Vornado is one of the three firms that are turning the old Farley Post Office building in New York into Moynihan Station, an expansion of Penn Station.

Roth has served as a trustee of the Intrepid Museum Foundation, the Whitney Museum of American Art, the Jewish Theological Seminary of America, and the New York University School of Medicine Foundation. He also served as chair of the National Association of Real Estate Investment Trusts (NAREIT) and as a member of the Board of Overseers of Tuck.

== Political involvement ==
Roth was a major donor to Eliot Spitzer's 2006 New York gubernatorial campaign. He served as one of the top economic advisers to Donald Trump's 2016 presidential campaign in 2016 and was included in a March 2017 White House meeting on the Trump Administration infrastructure plan. Roth was present at Trump headquarters on April 20, 2016, when Trump gave a speech celebrating his victory in multiple GOP primaries. Also present, and thanked by Trump, were Carl Icahn, Howard Lorber, and Bennett LeBow. But Roth won the lion's share of Trump's praise. The president later spoke of establishing a national panel of "very smart people that know how to spend money properly", with Roth and another New York developer Richard LeFrak as co-heads, to review infrastructure projects. In 2026, Roth likened "tax-the-rich" rhetoric to "disgusting racial slurs."

== The Roth Center for Jewish Life ==
In 1997, Roth contributed $1.1 million in funding for the eponyomus Roth Center for Jewish Life at Dartmouth.

== Honors and awards ==
In 2012, Roth received an honorary Doctor of Humane Letters degree from Dartmouth. He was a Crain's Hall of Fame inductee in 2015.

== Personal life ==
Roth's wife is Broadway producer Daryl Roth (née Atkins) who is also Jewish. They have two children: Jordan Roth (born 1975), who is the former owner of Jujamcyn Theaters; and Amanda Roth Salzhauer.

In August 2017, Roth had heart bypass surgery. After a brief medical leave, he returned to Vornado, saying to investors, “I’m not quite done yet.”
