= Adam Zotovich =

American Broadway performer and producer

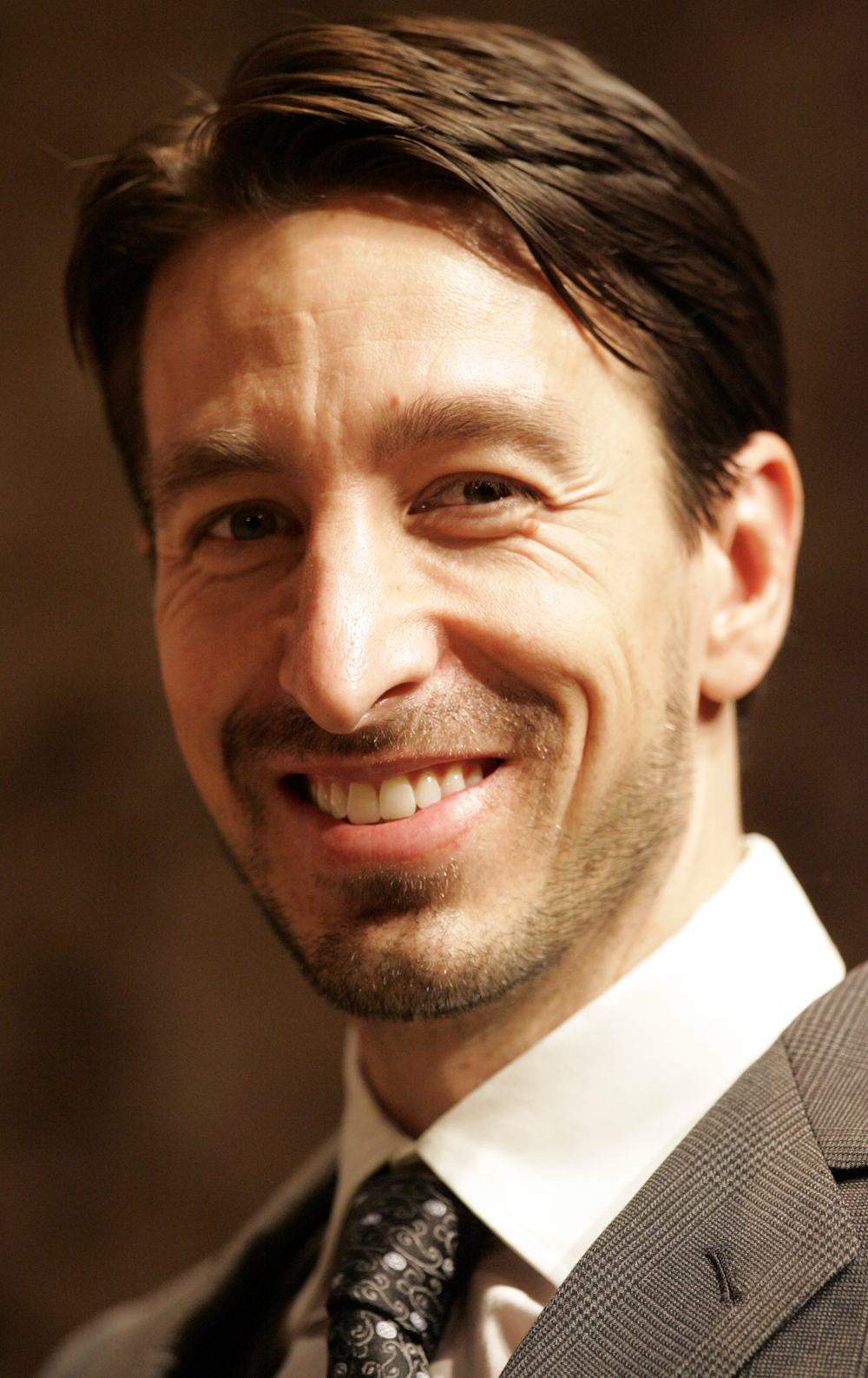
- Occupation: Producer

Adam Zotovich is a Broadway performer and producer. He is best known for being among the producers of The Color Purple's theatrical adaptation. As of 2014, Zotovich has produced eight shows that have spawned tours, a London engagement and have grossed a total of more than $245 million. As a performer, he has also been credited as an understudy, swing or replacement in shows such as The Wedding Singer, Contact, and revivals of Fiddler on the Roof and Chicago.

== Producing Credits ==
- Of Mice and Men - 2014
- Evita - 2012-2013
- Driving Miss Daisy - 2010-2011
- The Addams Family - 2010–2011
- A View From the Bridge - 2010
- All My Sons - 2008-2009
- Legally Blonde 2007-2008
- The Color Purple - 2005-2008
