= Daryl Roth =

American producer and director

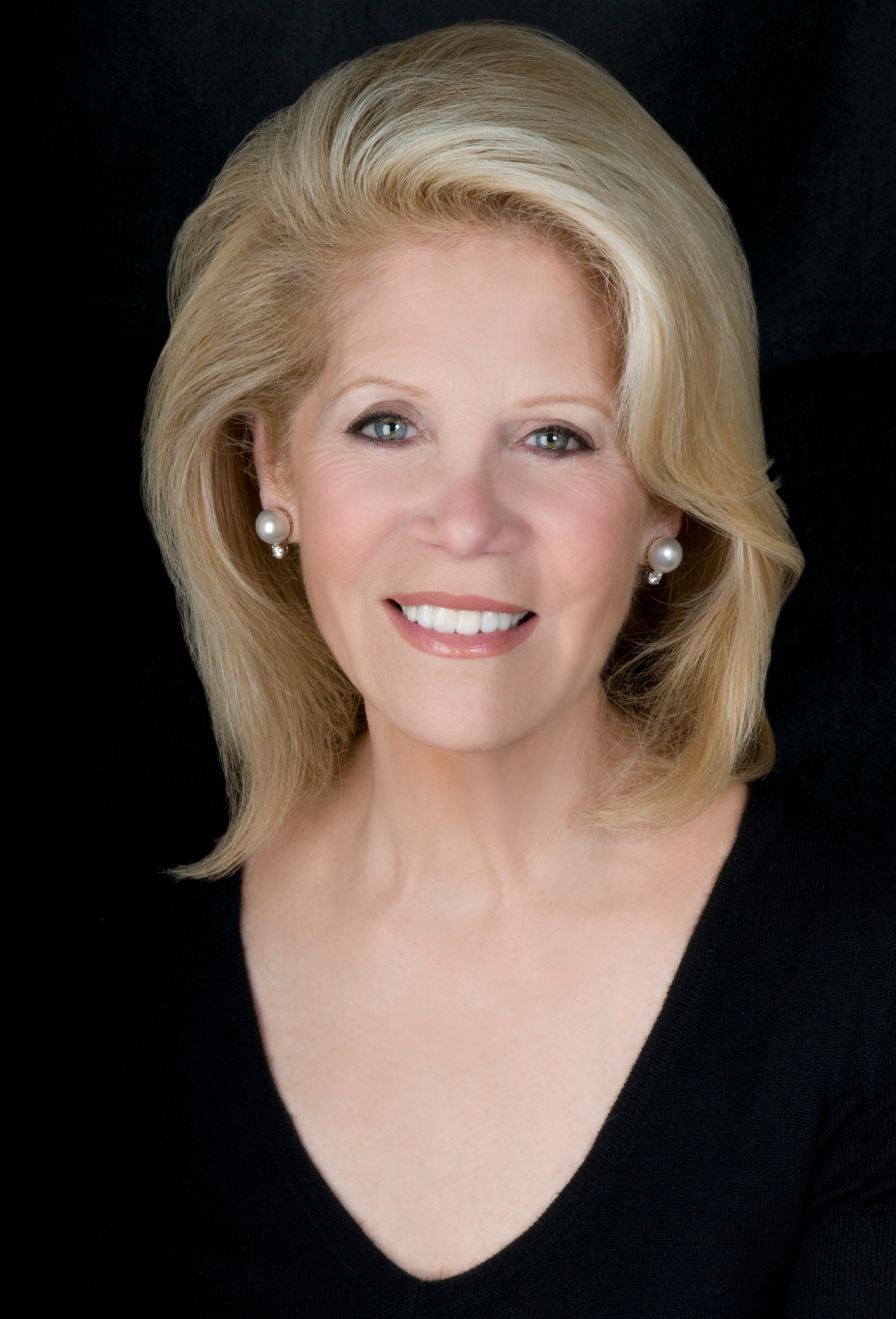
- Roth in 2008
- Born: Daryl Atkins; December 21, 1944 (age 81)
- Occupation: Theatrical producer
- Spouse: Steven Roth
- Children: 2, including Jordan Roth
- Website: https://www.darylrothproductions.com

Daryl Roth (born December 21, 1944) is an American theatre producer who has produced over 90 productions on and off Broadway. Most often serving as a co-producer or investor, Roth has also been a lead producer of Broadway shows such as Kinky Boots, Indecent, Sylvia, It Shoulda Been You, and The Normal Heart.

Roth frequently cites that she holds "the singular distinction of producing seven Pulitzer Prize-winning plays." She was a lead producer of Nilo Cruz's Anna in the Tropics, Margaret Edson's Wit, Paula Vogel's How I Learned to Drive, and Edward Albee's Three Tall Women. Roth was co-producer of Bruce Norris' Clybourne Park, Tracy Letts' August: Osage County, and David Auburn's Proof.

== Personal life ==
Roth was born Daryl Atkins to a Jewish family; her father was a car dealer, and her mother was a homemaker. She was raised in Wayne, New Jersey.

Roth is married to Steven Roth, the billionaire real estate investor; Mr. Roth is a business partner and close confidant of President Donald Trump. According to the New York Times, Ms. Roth "attended the Trump inauguration with her husband and has avoided publicly taking sides on the administration." In March 2019, President Trump appointed Ms. Roth to the board of trustees of the John F. Kennedy Center for the Performing Arts.

Daryl and Steven Roth have two children, including Jordan Roth, former president of Jujamcyn Theaters.

== Broadway productions ==
Roth's Broadway producing credits include:

- Indecent (2017), by Paula Vogel
- The Front Page (2016), by Ben Hecht and Charles MacArthur
- Shuffle Along, or, the Making of the Musical Sensation of 1921 and All That Followed (2016), by George C. Wolfe
- Arthur Miller's The Crucible (2016)
- The Humans (2016) (Tony Award), by Stephen Karam
- Arthur Miller's A View from the Bridge (2015) (Tony Award)
- Sylvia (2015), by A.R. Gurney
- An Act of God (2015) starring Jim Parsons, by David Javerbaum
- It Shoulda Been You (2015), book and additional lyrics by Brian Hargrove, music by Barbara Anselmi
- Fish in the Dark (2015), by Larry David
- Edward Albee's A Delicate Balance (2014) (revival)
- You Can't Take It With You (2014), by Moss Hart and George S. Kaufman
- This Is Our Youth (2014), by Kenneth Lonergan
- A Raisin in the Sun (2014) (Tony Award), by Lorraine Hansberry
- Betrayal (2013) starring Daniel Craig and Rachel Weisz, by Harold Pinter
- A Time to Kill (2013), by John Grisham, adapted by Rupert Holmes
- The Testament of Mary (2013) starring Fiona Shaw, by Colm Tóibín
- Kinky Boots (2013) (Tony Award), book by Harvey Fierstein, music and lyrics by Cyndi Lauper
- Lucky Guy (2013) starring Tom Hanks, by Nora Ephron
- Annie (revival) (2012), book by Thomas Meehan, music by Charles Strouse and lyrics by Martin Charnin
- Leap of Faith (2012) starring Raul Esparza, book by Janus Cercone and Warren Leight, music by Alan Menken and lyrics by Glenn Slater
- Clybourne Park (2012) (Tony Award), by Bruce Norris
- One Man, Two Guvnors (2012) starring James Corden, by Richard Bean
- The Normal Heart (revival) (2011) (Tony Award), by Larry Kramer
- War Horse (2011) (Tony Award), by Michael Morpurgo, adapted by Nick Stafford
- Driving Miss Daisy (2010) starring James Earl Jones and Vanessa Redgrave, by Alfred Uhry
- Enron (2010), by Lucy Prebble
- Come Fly Away (2010), by Twyla Tharp
- A Little Night Music (2009), book by Hugh Wheeler, music and lyrics by Stephen Sondheim
- Fela! (2009), book by Bill T. Jones and Jim Lewis, music by Fela Anikulapo Kuti, lyrics by Jim Lewis
- Desire Under the Elms (2009), by Eugene O'Neill
- Mary Stuart (2009), by Friedrich Schiller
- Irena's Vow (2009) starring Tovah Feldshuh, by Dan Gordon
- Thurgood (2008) starring Laurence Fishburne, by George Stevens, Jr.
- The Country Girl (2008) starring Morgan Freeman, by Clifford Odets
- A Catered Affair (2008), book by Harvey Fierstein, music and lyrics by John Bucchino
- Is He Dead? (2007), book by Mark Twain and David Ives
- August: Osage County (2007) (Tony Award), by Tracy Letts
- Deuce (2007), by Terrence McNally
- Curtains (2007), book by Rupert Holmes, music by John Kander, lyrics by Fred Ebb
- Coram Boy (2007), from the novel by Jamila Gavin, book adapted by Helen Edmundson
- Inherit the Wind (2007), by Jerome Lawrence and Robert E. Lee
- The Year of Magical Thinking (2007) starring Vanessa Redgrave, by Joan Didion
- Edward Albee's Who's Afraid of Virginia Woolf? (2005)
- Caroline, or Change (2004), book and lyrics by Tony Kushner, music by Jeanine Tesori
- Anna in the Tropics (2003), by Nilo Cruz
- Salome (2003) starring Al Pacino, by Oscar Wilde
- Euripides' Medea (2002)
- Edward Albee's The Goat, or Who Is Sylvia? (2002) (Tony Award)
- Bea Arthur on Broadway (2002), book by Bea Arthur and Billy Goldenberg
- The Tale of the Allergist's Wife (2000), by Charles Busch
- Proof (2000), by David Auburn
- Twilight: Los Angeles, 1992 (1994), by Anna Deavere Smith
- Nick & Nora (1991), book by Arthur Laurents, music by Charles Strouse, lyrics by Richard Maltby, Jr.

== Off-Broadway productions ==
Roth's off-Broadway producing credits include:

- Vitaly: An Evening of Wonders (2018)
- The Robber Bridegroom (2016), book and lyrics by Alfred Uhry, music by Robert Waldman
- The Absolute Brightness of Leonard Pelkey (2015), by Celeste Lecesne
- The Flick (2015), by Annie Baker
- Wiesenthal (2014), by Tom Dugan
- The Tribute Artist (2014), by Charles Busch
- Buyer & Cellar (2013), by Jonathan Tolins
- Stars of David (2013), conceived by Aaron Harnick & Abigail Pogrebin
- Bunnicula (2013), book by Charles Busch, music by Sam Davis, lyrics by Mark Waldrop
- My Name is Asher Lev (2012), adapted by Aaron Posner
- The Velveteen Rabbit (2012), by Kevin Del Aguila
- Olive and the Bitter Herbs (2011), by Charles Busch
- The Judy Show (2011), by Judy Gold
- Another American (2010), by Marc Wolf
- Through the Night (2010), by Daniel Beaty
- The Divine Sister (2010), by Charles Busch
- The Temperamentals (2010), by Jon Marans
- Vigil (2009), by Morris Paynch
- Love, Loss, and What I Wore (2009), by Nora Ephron and Delia Ephron
- What's That Smell: The Music of Jacob Sterling (2008), book and lyrics by David Pittu, music by Randy Redd
- Dear Edwina (2008), book and lyrics by Marcy Heisler, music by Zina Goldrich
- Die Mommie Die! (2007), by Charles Busch
- Assisted Loving (2006), by Bob Morris
- Not a Genuine Black Man (2006), by Brian Copeland
- Esoterica (2006), by Eric Walton
- Sandra Bernhard: Everything Bad and Beautiful (2006), by Sandra Bernhard
- Indoor Outdoor (2006), by Kenny Finkle
- Manuscript (2005), by Paul Grellong
- Thom Pain (based on nothing) (2005), by Will Eno
- Beckett/Albee (2003), by Edward Albee and Samuel Beckett
- Talking Heads (series) (2003), by Alan Bennett
- Tea at Five (2003), by Matthew Lombardo
- Our Lady of 121st Street (2003), by Stephen Adly Guirgis
- Harlem Song (2002), by George C. Wolfe
- Edward Albee's The Play About the Baby (2000)
- The Bomb-itty of Errors (1999), by Jordan Allen-Dutton, Jason Catalano, G.Q. and Erik Weiner
- Snakebit (1999), by David Marshall Grant
- Wit (1998), by Margaret Edson
- De La Guarda (1998), by Pichon Baldinu, Diqui James and Gabriel Kerpel
- Defying Gravity (1997), by Jane Anderson
- How I Learned to Drive (1997), by Paula Vogel
- Old Wicked Songs (1995), by Jon Marans
- Camping with Henry and Tom (1995), by Mark St. Germain
- Das Barbecu (1994), book and lyrics by Jim Luigs, music by Scott Warrender
- Edward Albee's Three Tall Women (1994)
- The Root (1993), by Gary Richards
- Tapestry: The Music of Carole King (1993), lyrics by Gerry Goffin, Carole King, D. Palmer and T. Stern, music by Carole King
- The Baby Dance (1991), by Jane Anderson
- Shmulnik's Waltz (1992), by Allan Knee
- Closer Than Ever (1989), lyrics by Richard Maltby Jr., music by David Shire

== Awards and nominations ==
Year	Show	Award	Category	Result
2016	Shuffle Along	Tony Award	Best Musical	Nominated
2016	Shuffle Along	Drama Desk Award	Outstanding Musical	Won
2016	The Humans	Tony Award	Best Play	Won
2016	The Humans	Drama Desk Award	Outstanding Play	Won
2016	The Humans	Outer Critics Circle	Outstanding New Broadway Play	Won
2016	The Crucible	Tony Award	Best Revival of a Play	Nominated
2016	The Crucible	Outer Critics Circle	Outstanding Revival of a Play	Nominated
2016	A View from the Bridge	Tony Award	Best Revival of a Play	Won
2016	A View from the Bridge	Drama Desk Award	Outstanding Revival of a Play	Won
2016	A View from the Bridge	Outer Critics Circle	Outstanding Revival of a Play	Nominated
2016	The Robber Bridegroom	Lucille Lortel Award	Outstanding Revival of a Musical	Won
2016	The Absolute Brightness of Leonard Pelkey	Lucille Lortel Award	Outstanding Solo Show	Nominated
2016	Kinky Boots	Olivier Awards	MasterCard Best New Musical	Won
2016	Kinky Boots	Evening Standard Award	Best Musical	Won
2015	It Shoulda Been You	Outer Critics Circle	Outstanding New Broadway Musical	Nominated
2014	You Can't Take It With You	Tony Award	Best Revival of a Play	Nominated
2014	You Can't Take It With You	Outer Critics Circle	Outstanding Revival of a Play	Won
2014	This is Our Youth	Tony Award	Best Revival of a Play	Nominated
2014	A Raisin in the Sun	Tony Award	Best Revival of a Play	Won
2014	Buyer & Cellar	Lucille Lortel Award	Outstanding Solo Show	Won
2013	The Testament of Mary	Tony Award	Best Play	Nominated
2013	The Testament of Mary	Outer Critics Circle	Outstanding New Broadway Play	Nominated
2013	Kinky Boots	Tony Award	Best Musical	Won
2013	Kinky Boots	Outer Critics Circle	Outstanding New Broadway Musical	Won
2013	Lucky Guy	Tony Award	Best Play	Nominated
2013	Lucky Guy	Outer Critics Circle	Outstanding New Broadway Play	Nominated
2013	Annie	Tony Award	Best Revival of a Musical	Nominated
2013	Annie	Outer Critics Circle	Outstanding Revival of a Musical	Nominated
2013	My Name is Asher Lev	Outer Critics Circle	Outstanding New Off-Broadway Play	Won
2012	Leap of Faith	Tony Award	Best Musical	Nominated
2012	Leap of Faith	Drama Desk Award	Outstanding Musical	Nominated
2012	Clybourne Park	Tony Award	Best Play	Won
2012	One Man, Two Guvnors	Outer Critics Circle	Outstanding New Broadway Play	Nominated
2011	The Normal Heart	Tony Award	Best Revival of a Play	Won
2011	The Normal Heart	Drama Desk Award	Outstanding Revival of a Play	Won
2011	The Normal Heart	Outer Critics Circle	Outstanding Revival of a Play	Won
2011	War Horse	Tony Award	Best Play	Won
2011	War Horse	Drama Desk Award	Outstanding Play	Won
2011	War Horse	Outer Critics Circle	Outstanding New Broadway Play	Won
2011	Through the Night	Lucille Lortel Award	Outstanding Solo Show	Nominated
2010	Come Fly Away	Outer Critics Circle	Outstanding New Broadway Musical	Nominated
2010	A Little Night Music	Tony Award	Best Revival of a Musical	Nominated
2010	A Little Night Music	Drama Desk Award	Outstanding Revival of a Musical	Nominated
2010	A Little Night Music	Outer Critics Circle	Outstanding Revival of a Musical	Nominated
2010	Fela!	Tony Award	Best Musical	Nominated
2010	Fela!	Drama Desk Award	Outstanding Musical	Nominated
2010	Fela!	Outer Critics Circle	Outstanding New Broadway Musical	Nominated
2010	The Temperamentals	Lucille Lortel Award	Outstanding Play	Nominated
2010	The Temperamentals	Outer Critics Circle	Outstanding New Off-Broadway Play	Nominated
2010	Love, Loss, and What I Wore	Drama Desk Award	Unique Theatrical Experience	Won
2009	Mary Stuart	Tony Award	Best Revival of a Play	Nominated
2009	Mary Stuart	Drama Desk Award	Outstanding Revival of a Play	Nominated
2009	Irena's Vow	Outer Critics Circle	Outstanding New Broadway Play	Nominated
2009	What's That Smell: The Music of Jacob Sterling	Outer Critics Circle	Outstanding New Off-Broadway Musical	Nominated
2008	The Country Girl	Drama Desk Award	Outstanding Revival of a Play	Nominated
2008	A Catered Affair	Drama Desk Award	Outstanding Broadway Musical	Nominated
2008	A Catered Affair	Outer Critics Circle	Outstanding New Broadway Musical	Nominated
2008	August: Osage County	Tony Award	Best Play	Won
2008	August: Osage County	Drama Desk Award	Outstanding Play	Won
2008	August: Osage County	Outer Critics Circle	Outstanding New Broadway Play	Won
2007	Curtains	Tony Award	Best Musical	Nominated
2007	Curtains	Drama Desk Award	Outstanding Musical	Nominated
2007	Curtains	Outer Critics Circle	Outstanding New Broadway Musical	Nominated
2007	Coram Boy	Outer Critics Circle	Outstanding New Broadway Play	Nominated
2007	Inherit the Wind	Tony Award	Best Revival of a Play	Nominated
2007	Inherit the Wind	Outer Critics Circle	Outstanding Revival of a Play	Nominated
2005	Who's Afraid of Virginia Woolf?	Tony Award	Best Revival of a Play	Nominated
2005	Who's Afraid of Virginia Woolf?	Drama Desk Award	Outstanding Revival of a Play	Nominated
2005	Who's Afraid of Virginia Woolf?	Outer Critics Circle	Outstanding Revival of a Play	Nominated
2004	Caroline, or Change	Tony Award	Best Musical	Nominated
2004	Caroline, or Change	Drama Desk Award	Outstanding Musical	Nominated
2004	Caroline, or Change	Outer Critics Circle	Outstanding New Broadway Musical	Nominated
2004	Anna in the Tropics	Tony Award	Best Play	Nominated
2004	Anna in the Tropics	Outer Critics Circle	Outstanding New Broadway Play	Nominated
2003	Medea	Drama Desk Award	Outstanding Revival of a Play	Nominated
2003	Talking Heads	Drama Desk Award	Outstanding Play	Nominated
2003	Talking Heads	Outer Critics Circle	Outstanding Off-Broadway Play	Nominated
2003	Our Lady of 121st Street	Lucille Lortel Award	Outstanding Play	Nominated
2003	Our Lady of 121st Street	Drama Desk Award	Outstanding Play	Nominated
2002	The Goat, Or Who Is Sylvia?	Tony Award	Best Play	Won
2002	The Goat, Or Who Is Sylvia?	Drama Desk Award	Outstanding New Broadway Play	Won
2001	The Tale of the Allergist's Wife	Tony Award	Best Play	Nominated
2001	Proof	Tony Award	Best Play	Won
2001	Proof	Drama Desk Award	Outstanding Play	Won
2001	Proof	Outer Critics Circle	Outstanding New Broadway Play	Won
2001	Bea Arthur on Broadway	Tony Award	Best Special Theatrical Event	Nominated
2001	The Play About the Baby	Lucille Lortel Award	Outstanding Play	Nominated
2000	The Bomb-itty of Errors	Outer Critics Award	Outstanding Off-Broadway Play	Nominated
1999	Snakebit	Outer Critics Award	Outstanding Off-Broadway Play	Nominated
1999	De La Guarda	Drama Desk Award	Unique Theatrical Experience	Won
1997	How I Learned to Drive	Lucille Lortel Award	Outstanding Play	Won
1997	How I Learned to Drive	Drama Desk Award	Outstanding Play	Won
1997	How I Learned to Drive	Outer Critics Circle	Outstanding Off-Broadway Play	Won
1995	Das Barbecu	Outer Critics Circle	Outstanding Off-Broadway Musical	Nominated
1995	Camping with Henry & Tom	Lucille Lortel Award	Outstanding Play	Won
1995	Camping with Henry & Tom	Outer Critics Circle	Outstanding Off-Broadway Play	Won
1994	Twilight: Los Angeles, 1992	Tony Award	Best Play	Nominated
1994	Three Tall Women	Drama Desk Award	Outstanding Play	Nominated
1989	Closer Than Ever	Outer Critics Circle	Best Off-Broadway Musical	Won

== Filmography ==
Roth's film credits include:

- James Lapine's film Custody starring Viola Davis
- Albert Nobbs starring Glenn Close
- the Emmy-nominated HBO feature, Dinner with Friends, based on Donald Margulies’ Pulitzer Prize-winning play
- The Lady in Question, a documentary based on the career of Charles Busch
- A Very Serious Person written by Charles Busch, starring Polly Bergen
- Don't Ask, Don't Tell starring Marc Wolf
- My Dog: An Unconditional Love Story a documentary exploring the relationships of well-known New Yorkers and their dogs

== Daryl Roth Theatre ==
The former Union Square Savings Bank building was acquired by Roth in 1996 and has undergone renovation and additions in order to create a three-hundred seat theatre, the Daryl Roth Theatre. A smaller theatre, the DR2 Theatre, is located in an annex at 103 East 15th Street.

== Philanthropy and honorary awards ==
Roth is a Member of the Mayor's Theater Subdistrict Council, an Honorary Trustee for Lincoln Center Theater, and served on the board of directors of the Albert Einstein College of Medicine and New York State Council on the Arts. She also is an appointed member of the New York City Police Foundation Board of Trustees.

Her other awards and honors include: The 2016 Order of the Golden Sphinx Award from The Hasty Pudding Institute of 1770; The 2014 New York Living Landmarks award; The 2013 Einstein Humanitarian Award from The Women's Division and Albert Einstein College of Medicine; The 2013 Broadway Association Visionary Leader Award; The Stella Adler 2012 Harold Clurman Spirit Award; the 2012 Family Equality Council Hostetter-Habib Family Award; The 2011 Live Out Loud Humanitarian Award, 2010 Lucille Lortel Lifetime Achievement Award, Primary Stages 2007 Honoree, The National Foundation for Jewish Culture's Patron of the Arts Award, The Jewish Theological Seminary's Louis Marshall Award, The Albert Einstein College of Medicine Spirit of Achievement Award, The National Corporate Theatre Fund's Chairman Award, and The Tisch School of the Arts Award for Artistic Leadership. Roth has twice been included in Crain's “100 Most Influential Women in Business.”

The Daryl Roth Creative Spirit Award annually honors a gifted theatre artist or organization, providing them with financial support as they develop new works in an artistic residency.
