= Jordan Roth =

American theater producer (born 1975)

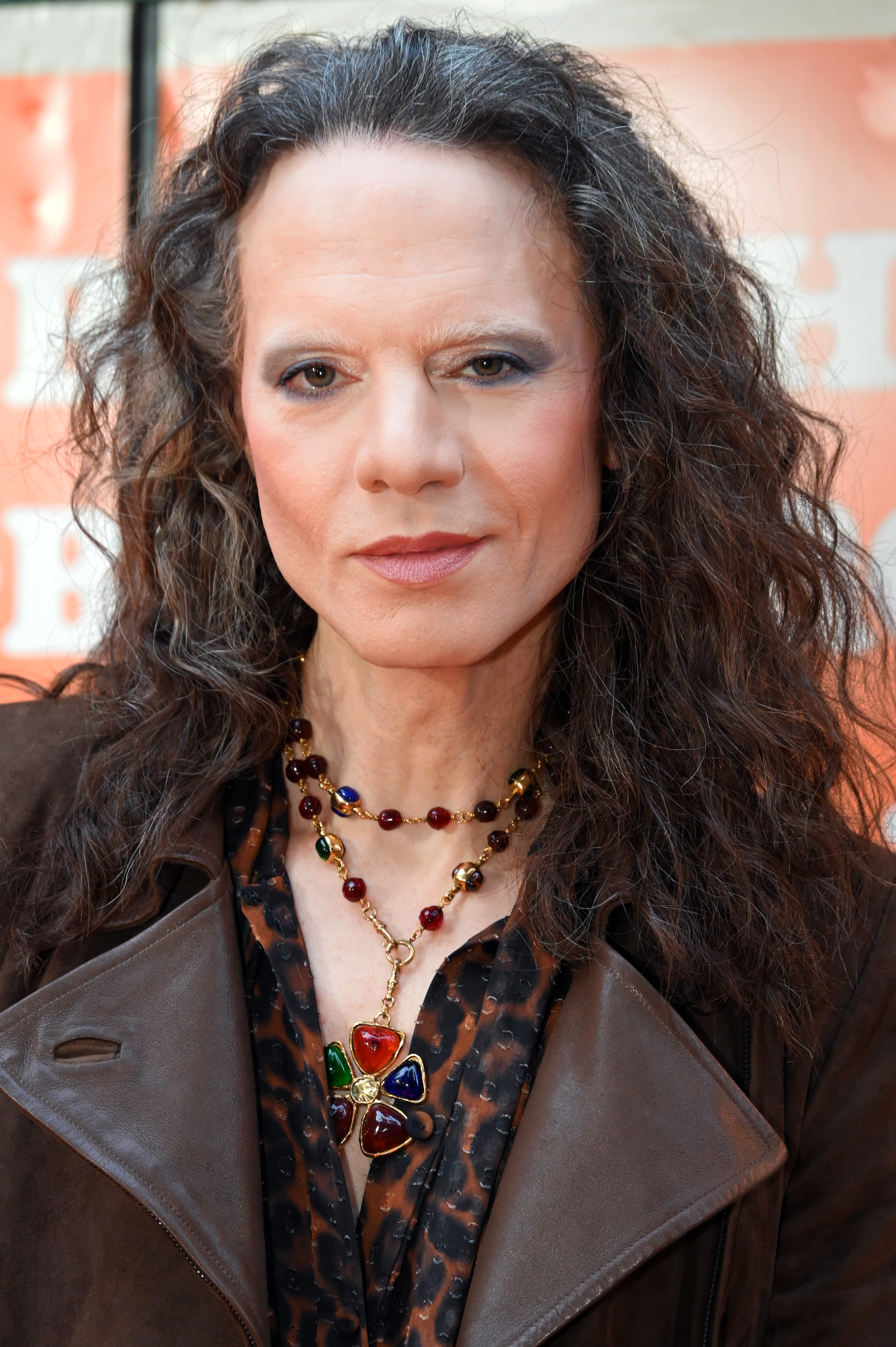
- Roth in 2026
- Born: November 13, 1975 (age 50); New York City, US
- Education: Princeton University (BA); Columbia University (MBA)
- Spouse: Richie Jackson (m. 2012)
- Children: 2
- Parent(s): Steven Roth; Daryl Roth

Jordan Roth (born November 13, 1975) is an American theater producer and creative director. A seven-time Tony Award-winning producer, his Broadway productions include Hadestown, Moulin Rouge!, Kinky Boots, and Angels in America. Roth's work also encompasses performance art, fashion, and acting.

== Early life ==
Born in New York City, Roth spent his early childhood in Ridgewood, New Jersey, with his sister and parents, real estate developer Steven Roth and theater producer Daryl Roth. He later returned to New York City and attended the Horace Mann School. Throughout high school, he performed in school productions and frequently attended Broadway shows with his mother.

Roth graduated with degrees in philosophy and theater from Princeton University. He later received an MBA from Columbia Business School.

After graduating, Roth returned to New York City. In 1999, he produced The Donkey Show, an interactive A Midsummer Night's Dream set to disco music. The production, a disco club event combining elements of both theater and nightlife, ran for six years off Broadway, toured internationally, and ran weekly at the Oberon space of the American Repertory Theater in Cambridge, Massachusetts until 2019. The show was described by The New York Times as "a lark, an exuberant and witty splicing of disparate sources."

== Career ==
=== Theater ===
In 2001, Roth staged a musical revival of the 1975 Broadway hit, The Rocky Horror Show, which ran until 2002. Through the course of the run, the cast included Dick Cavett, Joan Jett, Luke Perry, Ana Gasteyer, and a rotation of guest narrators. The show was nominated for four Tony Awards including Best Musical Revival in 2001, five Drama Desk Awards, two Outer Critics Circle Awards, and a Drama League Award.

In 2005, Roth joined Jujamcyn Theaters as a resident producer and was promoted to vice president in 2006. In September 2009, he purchased a 50 percent ownership stake in the company and became its president after owner Rocco Landesman was appointed by President Barack Obama to chair the National Endowment for the Arts. In 2013, Roth acquired a majority stake in Jujamcyn.

During Roth's tenure, Jujamcyn Theaters was home to productions including The Book of Mormon, Springsteen on Broadway, Moulin Rouge!, Clybourne Park, Kinky Boots, A Gentleman's Guide to Love and Murder, and Hadestown.

In 2023, Jujamcyn and ATG Entertainment combined operations. Roth became the company's largest individual shareholder, joined its board of directors, and assumed the role of creative director of ATG Entertainment. As part of the transaction, Jujamcyn sold a majority stake to ATG Entertainment and received a stake in the Lyric Theatre, the Hudson Theatre, and the Kings Theatre.

=== Performance art and fashion ===
In the mid-2020s, Roth expanded his work into performance art and fashion. In July 2025, Roth debuted Radical Acts of Unrelenting Beauty, at the Louvre Museum in Paris, a performance that combined elements of fashion, movement, and theatrical storytelling. Following the performance, he was invited by Performance Space New York to create a new work at the 2026 Venice Biennale at Palazzo dei Fiori.

Roth is an haute couture collector. In 2019, Roth journaled Paris Fashion Week for Vogue magazine and The New York Times described him as "red carpet magnet" because of his "penchant for avant-garde couture."

He has appeared on runways during Paris Couture Week and New York Fashion Week for designers including Thom Browne and Rahul Mishra. His work has appeared in publications including Vogue Portugal, L'Officiel, Paper, and Purple, and he has been photographed by David LaChapelle, Steven Klein, and Paolo Roversi.

Roth has attended the Met Gala since 2018.

=== Television and media ===
Roth has appeared on television as the Broadway correspondent to MSNBC's Morning Joe and has played himself in a recurring role on the NBC television series Smash.

In 2025, Roth was cast in a recurring role in the FX series The Shards, created by Ryan Murphy and based on the novel by Bret Easton Ellis.

From 2010 to 2015, Roth hosted the interview series Broadway Talks at the 92nd Street Y. He also produced and starred in the YouTube animated series, The Birds and the BS, published the online newsletter, Warmly Jordan, and founded the social network website Culturalist.

== Philanthropy ==
In 2007, Roth created Givenik.com, a service that allowed theater-goers to buy discounted tickets and give 5% of their ticket price to the charity of their choice. Givenik.com supported over 500 charitable organizations. As of 2020, it ceased operations.

Roth supports organizations focused on the arts and LGBTQ equality. He has served on the boards of Freedom To Marry and Broadway Cares/Equity Fights AIDS, The Broadway League, and The Center for Youth Mental Health.

On October 17, 2016, Roth and Harvey Weinstein collaborated to produce Broadway for Hillary, a one-night fundraiser hosted by Billy Crystal, featuring Julia Roberts, Lin-Manuel Miranda, Hugh Jackman, Sarah Jessica Parker, Emily Blunt, Angela Bassett, Neil Patrick Harris, and Helen Mirren.

On March 28, 2024, Roth and Anna Wintour produced An Evening with President Biden and Presidents Obama and Clinton a conversation with President Joe Biden, Barack Obama, and Bill Clinton, moderated by Steven Colbert at Radio City Music Hall, which raised $25 million.

== Personal life ==
In September 2012, Roth married Richie Jackson, a talent manager and executive producer. They have two sons, Jackson and Levi. Levi was born through surrogacy in 2016. They live in New York City.

== Awards and honors ==
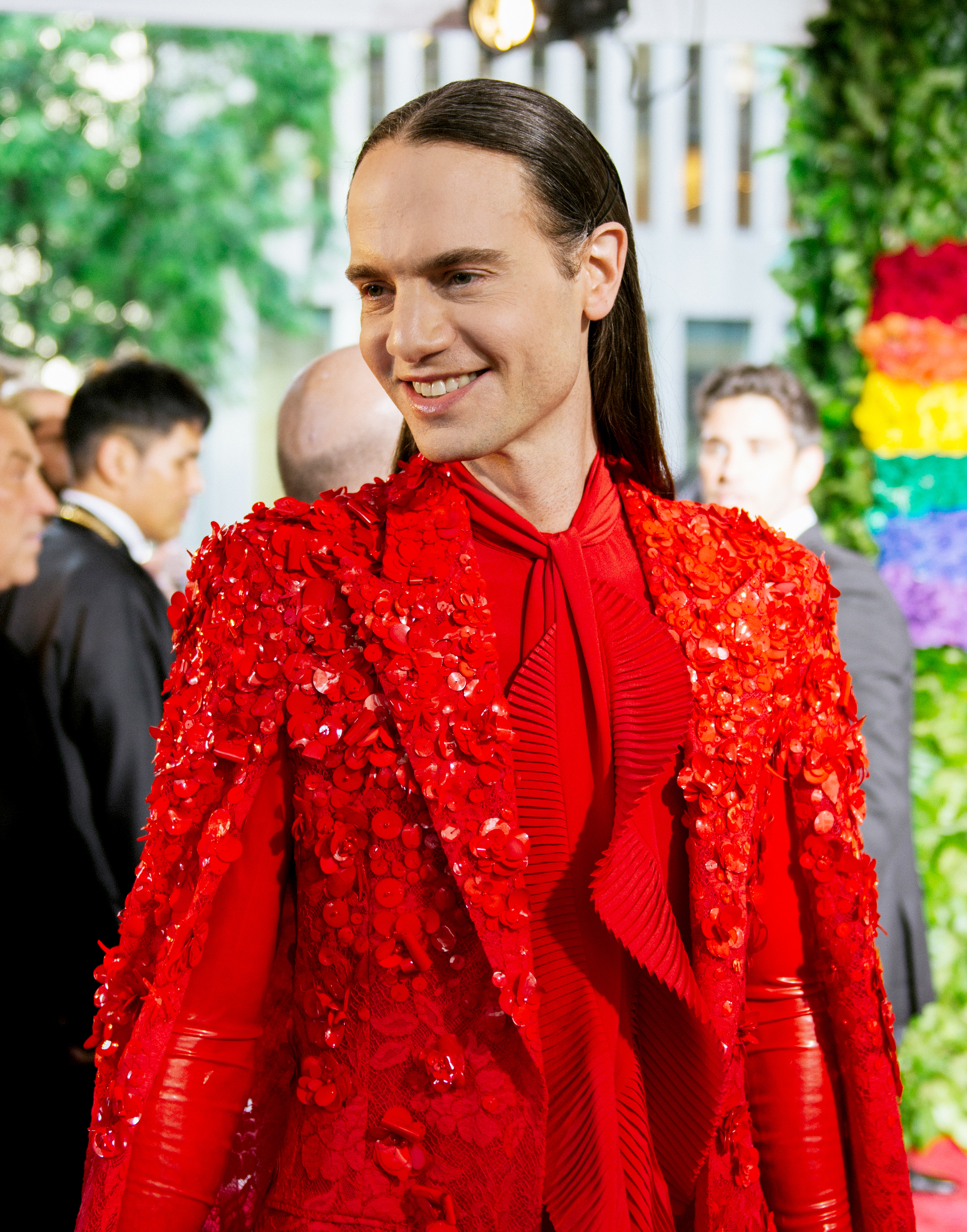
Jordan Roth in 2019

Roth is a seven-time Tony Award winner. Tony Award-winning productions he produced or presented include Hair, Clybourne Park, Kinky Boots, Angels in America, Hadestown, Moulin Rouge!, and Company.

Among Roth's most acclaimed production is the 2018 revival of Angels in America, which received eleven Tony Awards nominations and won for Best Revival of a Play, as well as awards for Andrew Garfield and Nathan Lane.

On February 2, 2019, Roth received the HRC Legacy Award, awarded by the Human Rights Campaign, an organization that raises funds in the fight for LGBT equality.

=== Tony Awards ===
Year	Category	Work	Result
2001	Best Revival of a Musical	The Rocky Horror Show	Nominated
2006	Best Musical	The Wedding Singer	Nominated
2007	Best Play	Radio Golf	Nominated
2009	Best Revival of a Musical	Hair	Won
2010	Best Revival of a Musical	Finian's Rainbow	Nominated
2012	Best Play	Clybourne Park	Won
2012	Best Musical	Leap of Faith	Nominated
2013	Best Musical	Kinky Boots	Won
2015	Best Musical	Something Rotten!	Nominated
2017	Best Musical	Groundhog Day	Nominated
2017	Best Revival of a Musical	Falsettos	Nominated
2017	Best Revival of a Play	Present Laughter	Nominated
2018	Best Revival of a Play	Angels in America	Won
2019	Best Revival of a Play	Torch Song	Nominated
2019	Best Musical	Hadestown	Won
2021	Best Musical	Moulin Rouge!	Won
2021	Best Musical	Jagged Little Pill	Nominated
2022	Best Revival of a Musical	Company	Won
2023	Best Revival of a Musical	Into the Woods	Nominated
2023	Best Musical	Some Like It Hot	Nominated

=== Drama Desk Awards ===
Year	Category	Work	Result
2001	Outstanding Revival of a Musical	The Rocky Horror Show	Nominated
2007	Outstanding Play	Radio Golf	Nominated
2008	Outstanding Musical	A Catered Affair	Nominated
2009	Outstanding Revival of a Musical	Hair	Won
2010	Outstanding Revival of a Musical	Finian's Rainbow	Nominated
2012	Outstanding Musical	Leap of Faith	Nominated
2015	Outstanding Musical	Something Rotten!	Nominated
2015	Outstanding Revival of a Musical	Side Show	Nominated
2017	Outstanding Revival of a Musical	Falsettos	Nominated
2018	Outstanding Revival of a Play	Angels in America	Won
2022	Outstanding Revival of a Play	Company	Won
2023	Outstanding Revival of a Musical	Into the Woods	Nominated
2023	Outstanding Musical	Some Like It Hot	Won

== See also ==
- LGBT culture in New York City
- List of LGBT people from New York City
- NYC Pride March
