= Warren Shepell =

Warren Shepell is a Canadian psychologist and human resources consultant who advocated for and founded companies which provided employee assistance programs (EAPs) in Canadian workplaces.

== Early life and education ==
Shepell was born in Winnipeg, Manitoba. He studied psychology at the University of Manitoba, earning B.A. in 1965. In 1968 he graduated with an M.A.Sc. in Industrial Psychology from the University of Waterloo. He earned a PhD in clinical psychology at the University of Pennsylvania.

== Career ==
In 1975 Shepell was hired as a consulting psychologist at Stevenson & Kellogg Ltd. Shepell started his Employee Assistance firms Warren Shepell Consultants Corp, Warren Shepell - EAP Professionals and Les Consultants Ltee in 1979. As well as counseling services, his company provided a 24-hour hotline and counseling to help employees and managers deal with workplace stress. By 1996 the company had about 500 counseling locations in Canada and the United States.

Shepell worked to bring mental health treatment and counseling to the mainstream population and to convince corporations to pay for the services. In 2002 Benefits Canada awarded him the Silver Medal Lifetime Achievement Award for his contribution to the Human Resources Benefits field. In 2003 his company Warren Shepell Consultants released a study showing that tech specialists were under more stress than most workers because of lack of job security.

Shepell sold Shepell EAP company in 2005. At that time it had about 1500 employees, mainly part and full-time psychologists and social workers, and provided coverage for about four million Canadian families.

After the sale of his company, Shepell continued to write, speak and consult about Employee Assistance programs and to operate EAP Surveys Inc. and later EAP Specialist Inc.
