= Barry and Fran Weissler =

American theatrical producers

Barry & Fran Weissler are American theatrical producers.

== Career ==
Barry Weissler (born February 22, 1939), a Rutgers Law School drop-out, and Fran Weissler (born April 15, 1938), a New York University drama major, met in 1964 during an engagement of a touring theatrical production in New Jersey. Both worked in retailing.

In 1970, they formed the National Artists Management Co., also known as Namco. Its mission was to present classic children, elementary school, high school, and college audiences to professional tasks. elementary schools, High School, College and adult audiences with professional casts.

After years of touring Shakespearean plays on the East Coast, they brought Othello and Medea to Broadway in 1982. The two plays earned them their first two Tony Award nominations. As of 2014, the pair have earned 28 Tony or Drama Desk nominations. They have won 7 Tony Awards and 4 Drama Desk Awards. The couple received the Olivier Award for Outstanding Musical Production for their production of Chicago in the London West End.

== Awards ==
In 2010, the Weisslers received the New York Musical Theatre Festival's lifetime achievement award.

In 2014, they received the PlayhouseSquare's "Star Award for achievement in the Performing Arts".

== Awards and nominations ==
The Weisslers have been nominated for many Tony Awards, Drama Desk Awards, and Olivier Awards.

- 2016 Waitress (musical) - Tony Award for Best Musical - nominee
- 2014 Violet - Tony Award - nominee
- 2014 Violet - Drama Desk Award - nominee
- 2013 Pippin - Tony Award - winner
- 2013 Pippin - Drama Desk Award - winner
- 2011 The Scottsboro Boys - Tony Award for Best Musical - nominee
- 2010 La Cage aux Folles - Tony Award - winner
- 2010 La Cage aux Folles - Drama Desk Award - winner
- 2010 Promises, Promises - Drama Desk Award - nominee
- 2005 Sweet Charity - Tony Award - nominee
- 2005 Sweet Charity - Drama Desk Award - nominee
- 2004 Wonderful Town - Tony Award - nominee
- 2004 Wonderful Town - Drama Desk Award - nominee
- 1999 Annie Get Your Gun - Tony Award - winner
- 1999 Annie Get Your Gun - Drama Desk Award - nominee
- 1997 Chicago - Tony Award - winner
- 1997 Chicago - Olivier Award for Best Revival of a Musical - winner
- 1997 Chicago - Drama Desk Award - winner
- 1994 Grease - Tony Award - nominee
- 1994 My Fair Lady - Drama Desk Award - nominee
- 1992 Falsettos - Tony Award for Best Musical - nominee
- 1992 Falsettos - Drama Desk Award - nominee
- 1991 Fiddler on the Roof - Tony Award for Best Revival - winner
- 1990 Gypsy - Tony Award for Best Revival - winner
- 1990 Gypsy - Drama Desk Award - winner
- 1990 Cat on a Hot Tin Roof - Drama Desk Award for Outstanding Revival - nominee
- 1988 Cabaret - Tony Award - nominee
- 1988 Cabaret - Drama Desk Award - nominee
- 1982 Othello - Tony Award for Reproduction (Play or Musical) - winner
- 1982 Medea - Tony Award for Reproduction (Play or Musical) - nominee

== Notable Productions ==
- Violet - Apr 20, 2014 - Aug 10, 2014
- Pippin - Apr 25, 2013 - Jan 04, 2015
- The Scottsboro Boys - Oct 31, 2010 - Dec 12, 2010
- Enron - Apr 27, 2010 - May 9, 2010
- Promises, Promises - Apr 25, 2010 - Jan 02, 2011
- La Cage aux Folles - Apr 18, 2010 - May 1, 2011
- Come Fly Away - Mar 25, 2010 - Sep 05, 2010
- Sweet Charity - May 4, 2005 - Dec 31, 2005
- Wonderful Town - Nov 23, 2003 - Jan 30, 2005
- Seussical - Nov 30, 2000 - May 20, 2001
- Annie Get Your Gun - Mar 04, 1999 - Sep 01, 2001
- Chicago on Broadway - Nov 14, 1996 – Present
- Chicago in London - November 18, 1997 – Present
- My Thing Of Love - May 3, 1995 - May 14, 1995
- Grease - May 11, 1994 - Jan 25, 1998
- My Fair Lady - Dec 09, 1993 - May 1, 1994
- Falsettos - Apr 29, 1992 - Jun 27, 1993
- Fiddler on the Roof - Nov 18, 1990 - Jun 16, 1991
- Cat on a Hot Tin Roof - Mar 21, 1990 - Aug 01, 1990
- Gypsy - Nov 16, 1989 - Jul 28, 1991
- Macbeth - Apr 21, 1988 - Jun 26, 1988
- Cabaret - Oct 22, 1987 - Jun 04, 1988
- André De Shields's Haarlem Nocturne - Nov 18, 1984 - Dec 30, 1984
- Zorba - Oct 16, 1983 - Sep 02, 1984
- Your Arms Too Short to Box with God - Sep 09, 1982 - Nov 07, 1982
- Medea - May 2, 1982 - Jun 27, 1982
- Othello - Feb 03, 1982 - May 23, 1982
- Babes in Toyland - Oct 23, 1979 - May 23, 1980
