= Alex Levy (producer) =

American media strategist, speechwriter, and theatrical producer

- Levy in 2026
- Born: Alexander Halpern Levy; Buffalo, New York
- Education: Wesleyan University; NYU School of Law
- Occupation: theatrical producer
- Organization(s): Playwrights Horizons (Vice chairman); The Broadway League
- Board member of: NYU School of Law Board of Trustees
- Awards: Tony Awards for Company (2022); A Strange Loop (2022); Parade (2023); Stereophonic (2024); Sunset Boulevard (2025); Death of a Salesman (2026)
- Website: https://www.ahlevy.com/

Alex Levy is an American media strategist, speechwriter, and theater producer. A six-time Tony award winner, he is the founder of Alex Levy Productions and A.H. Levy and Co., a New York-based communications firm.

== Early life and education ==
Levy was born and raised in Buffalo, New York. He earned a BA in government at Wesleyan University and a JD at New York University School of Law, where he was a member of the Order of the Coif. He graduated magna cum laude in 2014.

== Career ==
=== Speechwriting, communications, and media strategy ===
Levy sent his Wesleyan undergraduate thesis, "Rhetoric and Reason in the Estate Tax Repeal Debate," to Chuck Schumer, the senior United States senator from New York, who hired him as a tax and policy-focused legislative aide. In 2010 he was named Schumer's deputy communications director and chief speechwriter, a position he held until starting law school in 2011. The New York Times published an op-ed he wrote as a third-year law student, "Rein In Shady Tax Preparers".

After receiving his JD, he was clerk to Patti B. Saris, chief judge for the US District Court of Massachusetts. In 2015, he returned to speechwriting as a vice president at SKDKnickerbocker, a political and public affairs consultancy. His work centered on public affairs, messaging, and political strategy.

Levy founded A.H. Levy & Co., a Manhattan-based speechwriting and strategy firm, in 2016, with media, individual and institutional clients. He was described as "the secret macher whisperer beneath Gotham in "The Most Powerful New Yorkers You've Never Heard Of", a 2023 article in New York.

He was named to the NYU School of Law Board of Trustees in 2024.

== Theater ==
Levy is a member of The Broadway League and vice chairman of Playwrights Horizons. Through Alex Levy Productions, he has produced plays and musicals on and off-Broadway, in the West End and regionally. Between 2022 and 2026, he won six Tony awards as a producer of A Strange Loop (2022, Tony Award for Best Musical); Company (2022, Tony Award for Best Revival of a Musical); Parade (2023, Tony Award for Best Revival of A Musical); Stereophonic (2024, Tony Award for Best Play); Sunset Boulevard (2025, Tony Award for Best Revival of a Musical); and Death of a Salesman (2025, Tony Award for Best Revival).
