= Todd Haimes =

American artistic director (1956–2023)

- Born: Bernard Todd Haimes; May 7, 1956; New York City, U.S.
- Died: April 19, 2023 (aged 66); New York City, U.S.
- Education: University of Pennsylvania (BA); Yale University (MBA)
- Years active: 1983–2023
- Spouse: Jeanne-Marie
- Children: 2

Bernard Todd Haimes (May 7, 1956 – April 19, 2023) was an American artistic director. He held various roles at Roundabout Theatre Company from 1983 until his death in 2023. Haimes was recognized for rescuing the company from bankruptcy and transforming the theater into one of the most prominent and expansive nonprofit ensembles in the United States.

== Early life and education ==
Haimes acted in one play as a child, but lost interest in acting and decided to take on administration and theatre management roles. He earned a bachelor's degree from the University of Pennsylvania and an MBA from Yale University and was in his first year at Yale when he was hired by Roundabout, only to have the board vote to close two weeks later.

== Theater career ==
=== Roundabout Theatre Company ===
In 1983, Haimes joined the Roundabout Theatre Company as managing director. For the next 40 years, Haimes grew Roundabout from a small, off-Broadway space to one of the largest American nonprofit theater companies including the company's move to Times Square and restoration of what are now the American Airlines Theatre and Studio 54. In 2007, Haimes received a compensation package of more than $500,000, making him one of the highest paid figures in the not-for-profit theater world.

When Haimes took over as managing director, the company had already declared bankruptcy in 1978 and was burdened with a debt of approximately $2.5 million. Soon after Haimes's arrival, the board decided to cease the company's operations. During his initial month as the new leader, he did not receive any payment. Furthermore, when the company was unable afford a renewal mailer, he used his credit card to pay for it. According to a board member, Haimes undertook the expected measures of downsizing the staff, recruiting more competent and productive individuals, and enhancing the theater's appeal to subscribers. As a result of his efforts, he managed to turn the company's annual budget profitable within the first year and reduce its $2.4 million deficit by $1.6 million in five years. Under his direction, the company's base grew from around 18,000 in 1991 to over 30,000 in 1996.

In 1989, Haimes assumed the role of artistic director, a position he stated he was not entirely comfortable with as he saw himself more as a producer and that he did not believe that he was "equipped or responsible for interfering in the rehearsal and creative process". During his tenure, he expanded the Roundabout's focus to include classic works from esteemed playwrights such as Bernard Shaw, Henrik Ibsen, and Shakespeare, as well as revivals of contemporary masters like Brian Friel, Harold Pinter, and Tom Stoppard. Furthermore, the Roundabout also provided a platform for emerging playwrights such as Martin McDonagh (''Skull in Connemara,'' 2001) and Richard Greenberg (''The Dazzle,'' 2002) on their smaller stages. He was the first to introduce musicals into the company's repertoire including the first Broadway revival of She Loves Me. This growth helped the theater emerge from bankruptcy, move to Broadway and expand into what would eventually be five theater spaces including Roundabout Underground. The growth was documented in the 2016 film A Roundabout Road to Broadway. In early 2023, this included the first ever commercial rental of the American Airlines Theatre. Haimes became chief executive officer of the company in 2015.

Among the notable Roundabout productions during Haimes' tenure were Cabaret starring Natasha Richardson and Alan Cumming, and the first ever sanctioned livestream of a production, She Loves Me, both of which earned the company Tony Awards. During his tenure at Roundabout, the company won 34 Tony, 58 Drama Desks, 73 Outer Critics Circle, 21 Lucille Lortel and 14 Obie Awards.

Haimes' success with the Roundabout has been attributed to his use of modern corporate techniques such as catering to his audience preferences and providing a familiar product in a comfortable setting, while securing corporate sponsors. Rocco Landesman acknowledged the success of the approach but noted that it may lead to a lack of artistic risk-taking and a standardized approach to theater.

=== Other endeavors ===
In September 1998, Haimes was hired by Roy Furman and Michael Ovitz to take over the role of artistic director at Livent, a major theater company known for extravagant production. At the time, the company faced financial difficulties due to allegations of excessive spending by its founders, Garth Drabinsky and Myron Gottlieb. The company's stock had been frozen since August, and shareholders had filed a class-action lawsuit against it.

Before beginning his long career at Roundabout, he was general manager at Stamford, Connecticut's Harman Theater Company and managing director at the Westport Country Playhouse.

In addition to his work at Roundabout, Haimes was president and a board member at Art/New York and was a member of The Broadway League's Executive Committee. He taught theater administration at both Yale and Brooklyn College and was advisor to Hunter College's theater program.

== Personal life ==
Haimes married neuroradiologist Alison Bender Haimes in 1982. The couple met while working on a set at the University of Pennsylvania. He had a son, Andrew, and a daughter, Hilary.

In December 2002, Haimes was diagnosed with sarcoma of the jaw. He subsequently underwent surgery to replace his right jawbone with a bone from his calf, a procedure that was followed by months of chemotherapy.

== Awards, accolades, and legacy ==
- Lucille Lortel Outstanding Lifetime Achievement (2013)
- The Roundabout Theatre Company announced in June 2023 that Broadway's American Airlines Theatre would be renamed for Haimes later that year. The new marquee was unveiled on January 31, 2024.

== Death ==
Haimes died of complications related to osteosarcoma, with which he had been diagnosed since 2002, on April 19, 2023, at the age of 66 in his hometown, New York City.
