= Jim Kierstead =

American theatre and film producer and writer

- Born: Wayne, New Jersey, U.S.
- Education: Ramapo College, New York University, William Paterson University
- Occupation: Producer
- Years active: 2008–present
- Website: kiersteadproductions.com

Jim Kierstead is a Tony Award, Olivier Award, Drama Desk, and Daytime Emmy Award-winning American theatre producer, film producer, and writer. He is best known for his work on Broadway.

== Film and television ==
Kierstead served as co-executive producer for Wakefield (2016), starring Bryan Cranston, and based on the short story of the same name by E. L. Doctorow. For the series The Bay, Kierstead and his co-producers were awarded the 2018 Emmy Award for Outstanding Digital Daytime Drama Series.

== Productions ==
- 2023, The Gospel According to Heather (Off-Broadway), dir. Rachel Klein
- 2023, Sweeney Todd: The Demon Barber of Fleet Street (Broadway), dir. Thomas Kail
- 2022, The Minutes (Broadway), dir. Anna D. Shapiro
- 2021, Mrs. Doubtfire (Broadway), dir. Jerry Zaks
- 2019 The Inheritance (Broadway), dir. Stephen Daldry
- 2019 Frankie and Johnny in the Clair de Lune (Broadway), dir. Arin Arbus
- 2019 Ain't Too Proud (Broadway), dir. Des McAnuff
- 2019 Be More Chill (Broadway), dir. Stephen Brackett
- 2018 American Son (Broadway), dir. Kenny Leon
- 2018 Pretty Woman (Broadway), dir. Jerry Mitchell
- 2017 M. Butterfly (Broadway), dir. Julie Taymor
- 2017 Indecent (Broadway), dir. Rebecca Taichman
- 2016 Natasha, Pierre & The Great Comet of 1812 (Broadway), dir. Rachel Chavkin
- 2016 The Encounter (Broadway), dir. Simon McBurney
- 2015 It Shoulda Been You (Broadway), dir. David Hyde Pierce
- 2015 Kinky Boots (West End), dir. Jerry Mitchell
- 2014 Side Show (Broadway), dir. Bill Condon
- 2014 You Can't Take It with You (Broadway), dir. Scott Ellis
- 2014 Rocky the Musical (Broadway), dir. Alex Timbers
- 2013 Pippin (Broadway), dir. Diane Paulus
- 2013 Kinky Boots (Broadway), dir. Jerry Mitchell

== Awards and nominations ==
Year	Show	Award	Category	Result	Ref.
2022	The Minutes	Tony Award	Best Play	Nominated	
2020	The Inheritance	Tony Award	Best Play	Won	
2020	The Inheritance	Drama Desk Award	Outstanding Play	Won	
2020	Frankie and Johnny in the Clair de Lune	Tony Award	Best Revival of a Play	Nominated	
2019	Ain't Too Proud	Tony Award	Best Musical	Nominated	
2019	Be More Chill	Drama Desk Award	Outstanding Musical	Nominated	
2017	Natasha, Pierre & The Great Comet of 1812	Tony Award	Best Musical	Nominated	
2017	Indecent	Tony Award	Best Play	Nominated	
2017	Indecent	Drama Desk Award	Outstanding Play	Nominated	
2016	Kinky Boots	Olivier Award	Best New Musical	Won	
2015	You Can't Take It With You	Tony Award	Best Revival of a Play	Nominated	
2015	Side Show	Drama Desk Award	Outstanding Revival of a Musical or Revue	Nominated	
2014	Rocky the Musical	Drama Desk Award	Outstanding Musical	Nominated	
2013	Kinky Boots	Tony Award	Best Musical	Won	
2013	Pippin	Tony Award	Best Revival of a Musical	Won	
2013	Pippin	Drama Desk Award	Outstanding Revival of a Musical or Revue	Won	
