= Pagoda House =

Coordinates: 32°3′57.18″N 34°46′27.26″E

- בית הפגודה
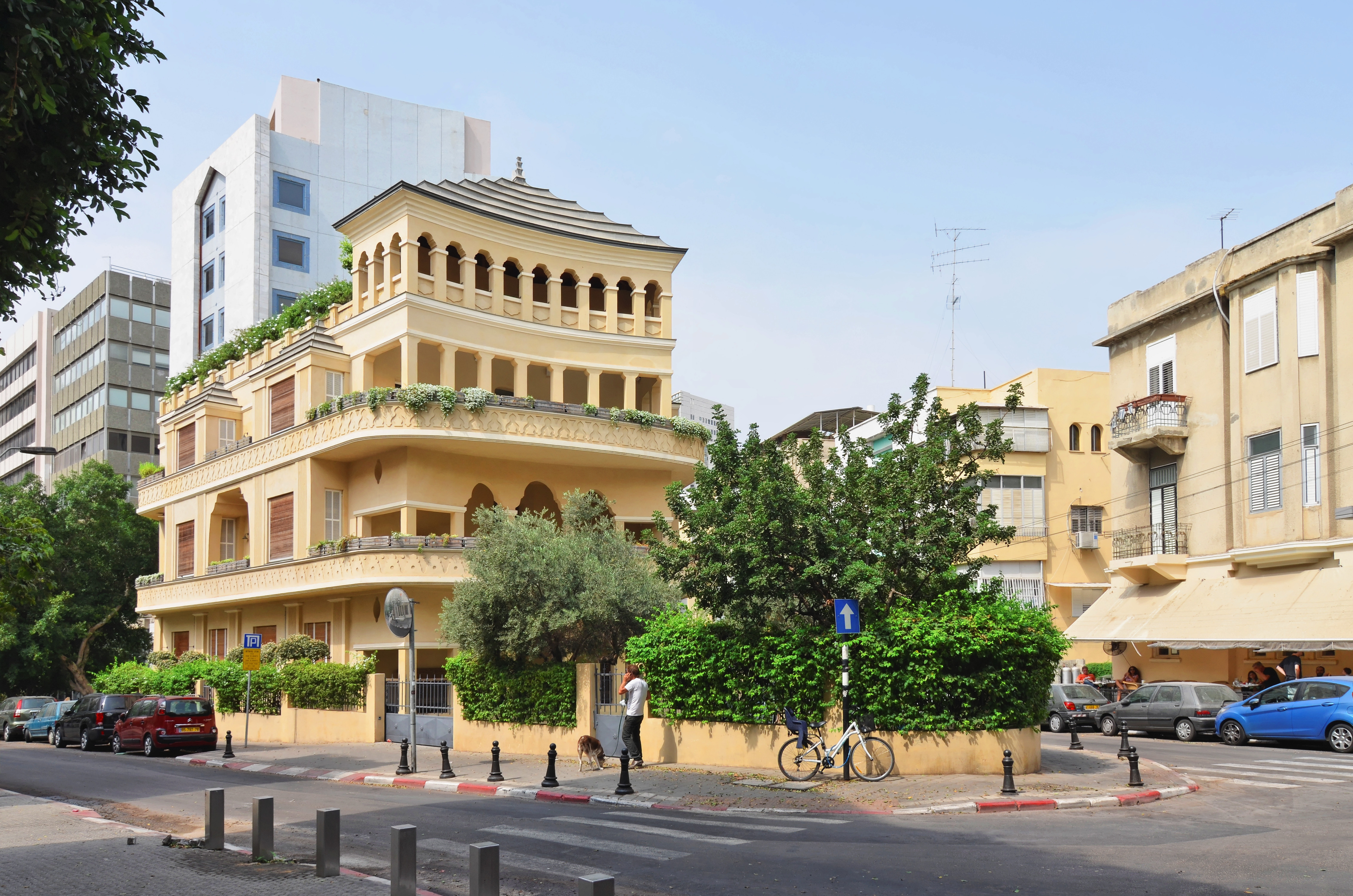
- Alternative names: Beit HaPagoda

General information
- Status: Completed
- Type: Private residence
- Architectural style: Eclectic
- Address: King Albert Square, corner of Nahmani and Montefiore Streets
- Town or city: Tel Aviv
- Country: Israel
- Completed: 1924
- Renovated: 1990s
- Owner: Robert Weil

Design and construction
- Architect(s): Alexander Levy
- Known for: First private residence in Tel Aviv with an elevator

Renovating team
- Architect(s): Ulrick Plesner

Pagoda House (Hebrew: בית הפגודה, Beit HaPagoda) is an Eclectic Style building in central Tel Aviv built in 1924. It was the first private residence in Tel Aviv to have an elevator, installed to accommodate the Polish ambassador who resided on the third floor.

The building, located at King Albert Square on the corner of Nahmani and Montefiore Streets, was designed by the architect Alexander Levy. Over the years, the building fell into disrepair. In the 1990s, it was purchased by Swedish businessman Robert Weil, who restored it. Andrée Putman French creator designed al the interiors including furniture and roof pavillon; Ulrick Plesner was in charge of the architectural renovation. The Pagoda House was built during the architectural boom of the 1920s. It was inspired by a cafe in the United States, combining Oriental and Western style elements.
