= 20th Tony Awards =

1966 US theatrical awards ceremony

- Date: June 16, 1966
- Location: Rainbow Room, Rockefeller Center
- Hosted by: George Abbott and Ginger Rogers
- Most wins: Man of La Mancha (5)
- Most nominations: Sweet Charity (9)

Television/radio coverage
- Network: CBS Radio

The 20th Annual Tony Awards was broadcast on June 16, 1966, from the Rainbow Room at Rockefeller Center on radio station WCBS. This was the first afternoon Tony Awards ceremony. The Masters of Ceremonies were George Abbott and Ginger Rogers. The ceremony was sponsored by the League of New York Theatres in conjunction with the American Theatre Wing, which had previously solely arranged the ceremony.

== Eligibility ==
Shows that opened on Broadway during the 1965–1966 season before May 26, 1966 are eligible.

Original plays

- The Best Laid Plans
- Cactus Flower
- The Caucasian Chalk Circle
- The Condemned of Altona
- The Devils
- Entertaining Mr Sloane
- First One Asleep, Whistle
- Generation
- The Great Indoors
- Happily Never After
- Hostile Witness
- The Impossible Years
- Inadmissible Evidence
- The Lion in Winter
- Malcolm
- Marat/Sade
- Mark Twain Tonight!
- Mating Dance
- Me and Thee
- Minor Miracle
- Mrs. Dally
- Nathan Weinstein, Mystic, Connecticut
- Philadelphia, Here I Come!
- The Playroom
- Postmark Zero
- The Right Honourable Gentleman
- The Royal Hunt of the Sun
- Slapstick Tragedy
- 3 Bags Full
- UTBU
- A Very Rich Woman
- Wait Until Dark
- The Wayward Stork
- Where's Daddy?
- Xmas in Las Vegas

Original musicals

- Anya
- Drat! The Cat!
- It's a Bird... It's a Plane... It's Superman
- La Grosse Valise
- Mame
- Man of La Mancha
- On a Clear Day You Can See Forever
- Pickwick
- Pousse-Café
- Skyscraper
- Sweet Charity
- A Time for Singing
- Wait a Minim!
- The Yearling
- The Zulu and the Zayda

Play revivals

- The Country Wife
- Danton's Death
- Ivanov
- You Can't Take It with You

== The ceremony ==
Presenters: Lauren Bacall, Herschel Bernardi, Sandy Dennis, Henry Fonda, Phil Ford, Mimi Hines, Ray Milland, Barry Nelson, Mike Nichols, Thelma Oliver, April Olrich, Maureen O'Sullivan, Neil Simon

Music was by Meyer Davis and his Orchestra.

== Award winners and nominees ==
Winners are in bold

Best Play	Best Musical
**Marat/Sade – Peter Weiss**; Inadmissible Evidence – John Osborne; Philadelphia, Here I Come! – Brian Friel; The Right Honourable Gentleman – Michael Dyne	**Man of La Mancha**; Mame; Skyscraper; Sweet Charity
Best Performance by a Leading Actor in a Play	Best Performance by a Leading Actress in a Play
**Hal Holbrook – Mark Twain Tonight! as Mark Twain**; Roland Culver – Ivanov as Pavel Lebedev; Donal Donnelly and Patrick Bedford – Philadelphia, Here I Come! as Gareth O'Donnell; Nicol Williamson – Inadmissible Evidence as Bill Maitland	**Rosemary Harris – The Lion in Winter as Eleanor of Aquitaine**; Sheila Hancock – Entertaining Mr Sloane as Kath; Kate Reid – Slapstick Tragedy as Celeste/Molly; Lee Remick – Wait Until Dark as Susy Hendrix
Best Performance by a Leading Actor in a Musical	Best Performance by a Leading Actress in a Musical
**Richard Kiley – Man of La Mancha as Don Quixote/Cervantes**; Jack Cassidy – It's a Bird... It's a Plane... It's Superman as Max Mencken; John Cullum – On a Clear Day You Can See Forever as Dr. Mark Bruckner; Harry Secombe – Pickwick as Pickwick	**Angela Lansbury – Mame as Mame Dennis**; Barbara Harris – On a Clear Day You Can See Forever as Daisy/Melinda; Julie Harris – Skyscraper as Georgina; Gwen Verdon – Sweet Charity as Charity Hope Valentine
Best Performance by a Supporting or Featured Actor in a Play	Best Performance by a Supporting or Featured Actress in a Play
**Patrick Magee – Marat/Sade as Marquis de Sade**; Burt Brinckerhoff – Cactus Flower as Igor; Larry Haines – Generation as Stan Herman; Eamon Kelly – Philadelphia, Here I Come! as S. B. O'Donnell	**Zoe Caldwell – Slapstick Tragedy as Polly**; Glenda Jackson – Marat/Sade as Charlotte Corday; Mairin D. O'Sullivan – Philadelphia, Here I Come! as Madge; Brenda Vaccaro – Cactus Flower as Toni
Best Performance by a Supporting or Featured Actor in a Musical	Best Performance by a Supporting or Featured Actress in a Musical
**Frankie Michaels – Mame as Patrick Dennis**; Roy Castle – Pickwick as Sam Weller; John McMartin – Sweet Charity as Oscar; Michael O'Sullivan – It's a Bird... It's a Plane... It's Superman as Dr. Abner Sedgwick	**Beatrice Arthur – Mame as Vera Charles**; Helen Gallagher – Sweet Charity as Nickie; Patricia Marand – It's a Bird... It's a Plane... It's Superman as Lois Lane; Charlotte Rae – Pickwick as Mrs. Bardell
Best Direction of a Play	Best Direction of a Musical
**Peter Brook – Marat/Sade**; Hilton Edwards – Philadelphia, Here I Come!; Ellis Rabb – You Can't Take It with You; Noel Willman – The Lion in Winter	**Albert Marre – Man of La Mancha**; Cy Feuer – Skyscraper; Bob Fosse – Sweet Charity; Gene Saks – Mame
Best Original Score (Music and/or Lyrics) Written for the Theatre	Best Choreography
**Man of La Mancha – Mitch Leigh (music) and Joe Darion (lyrics)**; Sweet Charity – Cy Coleman (music) and Dorothy Fields (lyrics); Mame – Jerry Herman (music and lyrics); On a Clear Day You Can See Forever – Burton Lane (music) and Alan Jay Lerner (lyrics)	**Bob Fosse – Sweet Charity**; Jack Cole – Man of La Mancha; Michael Kidd – Skyscraper; Onna White – Mame
Best Scenic Design	Best Costume Design
**Howard Bay – Man of La Mancha**; William Eckart and Jean Eckart – Mame; David Hays – Drat! The Cat!; Robert Randolph – Anya, Skyscraper and Sweet Charity	**Gunilla Palmstierna-Weiss – Marat/Sade**; Loudon Sainthill – The Right Honourable Gentleman; Howard Bay and Patton Campbell – Man of La Mancha; Irene Sharaff – Sweet Charity

== Special awards ==
Helen Menken (posthumous), for a lifetime of devotion and dedicated service to the Broadway theatre.

=== Multiple nominations and awards ===
These productions had multiple nominations:

- 9 nominations: Sweet Charity
- 8 nominations: Mame
- 7 nominations: Man of La Mancha
- 5 nominations: Marat/Sade, Philadelphia, Here I Come! and Skyscraper
- 3 nominations: It's a Bird... It's a Plane... It's Superman, On a Clear Day You Can See Forever and Pickwick
- 2 nominations: Cactus Flower, Inadmissible Evidence, The Lion in Winter, The Right Honourable Gentleman and Slapstick Tragedy

The following productions received multiple awards.

- 5 wins: Man of La Mancha
- 4 wins: Marat/Sade
- 3 wins: Mame

== See also ==
- 38th Academy Awards
