= Bob Holiday =

American actor (1932–2017)

- Born: November 12, 1932; Brooklyn, New York, U.S.
- Died: January 27, 2017 (aged 84); Hawley, Pennsylvania, U.S.
- Occupation: Actor
- Known for: Played Superman more than any other actor
- Notable work: It's a Bird... It's a Plane... It's Superman

Bob Holiday (November 12, 1932 – January 27, 2017) was an American actor best known for playing Superman in the 1966 Broadway musical It's a Bird... It's a Plane... It's Superman. Historically, Holiday was the next "live-action" Superman after George Reeves. Holiday played Superman more than any other actor, having played the role in over 140 performances, as well as several live appearances in character. From 1999 until his death in 2017, he reigned as the eldest surviving live-action Superman.

== Superman ==
Holiday had the title role in the 1966 musical. According to author Bruce Scivelli, "Holiday remained in his Superman costume after the matinees and invited the kids backstage for autographs. Towering over his young fans, the 6-foot-4-inch actor signed their programs and admonished them to drink their milk and be good." Despite excellent reviews and Tony nominations for co-stars Jack Cassidy, Michael O'Sullivan and Patricia Marand, the show closed after 129 performances.

In 1967 he reprised the role of Superman in two separate revivals. These revivals took place in open-air theatres, requiring Superman to fly with the help of a large crane. During the heyday of "It's a Bird It's a Plane It's Superman!" he appeared as Superman in an ad for UniRoyal carpet and made personal appearances on "I've Got a Secret," "The Tonight Show Starring Johnny Carson", and at the Sixth International Fashion Show held at Macy's in New York City. In 1971, Bob donned the cape yet again, appearing as Superman in an Aqua Velva TV commercial.

On March 23, 2013, Holiday attended the New York City Center Encores! staged concert of the show and met with the cast.

Holiday always enjoyed hearing from fans of the show. In 2003, he celebrated his time as Superman at the annual Metropolis Superman Celebration in Illinois. A documentary was made of this visit, entitled "Holiday in Metropolis." A panel discussion as well as still photos from the visit are available on Holiday's official website.

Holiday died at his home in Hawley, Pennsylvania on January 27, 2017, aged 84.

== Other activities ==
Holiday appeared previously on Broadway in Fiorello! opposite Tom Bosley. He also starred as Sir Lancelot in the 1964 touring company of Camelot opposite Howard Keel. After It's a Bird...It's a Plane...It's Superman ended, Bob moved to Los Angeles and co-starred with Anthony Roberts in Promises, Promises. The Brady Bunch producer Sherwood Schwartz cast Holiday as Mike Brady, but studio executives overrode that decision.

After leaving show business, Holiday opened Bob Holiday Custom Homes, LLC. He spent 30 years as a successful home builder in the Pocono Mountains, and retired in 2009. His assistant for the last ten years of his life was a dedicated fan, Toni Collins.
