= The Right Honourable Gentleman =

Play by Michael Dyne

The Right Honourable Gentleman is a 1962 play by Michael Dyne, first staged in 1964.

== Plot ==
The Right Honourable Gentleman is a dramatization of the rather complicated real-life Crawford scandal of Victorian England. Sir Charles Dilke, an important Liberal member of Parliament, is seen as a possible successor to Gladstone as Prime Minister. The circumstances leading to his destruction, his private affairs as contrasted with those of the Empire, form the crux of the play.

The play introduce Dilke in his finest hour, an obvious choice for the new cabinet. But a certain Mr. Crawford sues his wife for divorce, naming Sir Charles as an involved party, based on his wife's confession that she had been having an affair with Sir Charles for some time. Mrs. Crawford provides dates and facts and is quite credible, while Sir Charles offers avowals of complete innocence, not just publicly but solemnly sworn to in private to his fiancee.

And in fact Mrs. Crawford is lying, and instead is madly in love and carrying on with a certain Captain Foster, which may have been a reason for inventing her charges against the unfortunate Sir Charles. But Sir Charles had been conducting a long-term affair with Mrs. Crawford's mother, which, when it comes out, destroys his reputation and career.

== Productions ==
The Right Honourable Gentleman, produced by Emile Littler, premiered in London's West End on May 28, 1964, and ran for three years. Players included Anthony Quayle, Jack Gwillim, Corin Redgrave, Anna Massey, and Terence Bayler, and Glen Byam Shaw directed.

The Right Honourable Gentleman opened on Broadway on October 19, 1965 at the Billy Rose Theatre. There were no out-of-town tryouts, instead 12 preview performances at the Billy Rose. Charles Gray played the title role, Sir Charles Dilke. Other players were Coral Brown, Sarah Badel as Mrs. Crawford, William Roerick as Joseph Chamberlain, and Marie Wallace. Frith Banbury directed.

The New York Journal-American described the production as "a British import in their best tradition", while the New York Herald Tribune said "it is deft at keeping you riveted to its tricky game of truth or consequences". The New York Morning Telegraph said "now we have [a play] of meat and substance, of stature and importance" and praised the "superior cast". Jack O'Brian wrote that "The Right Honourable Gentleman is a fine, fine play... sheer entertainment in its shock-treatment of a theme written brilliantly, plotted beautifully, acted soundly, and produced properly". Otis Guernsey Jr. wrote that it was "a good job expertly done, but perhaps just a bit creaky in its theatrical joints as it played out its mannered exposé".

The Right Honourable Gentleman was only a modest hit on Broadway, and the 1966 New York City transit strike toward the end of its run harmed business. The play closed on January 29, 1966 after 118 performances. At the 20th Tony Awards in 1966, The Right Honourable Gentleman was nominated for best play and best costume design.

Revivals have included a 1967 production at the Huntington Hartford Theatre (now the Ricardo Montalbán Theatre) in Los Angeles, and a production during the 1968–1969 season at the Citadel Theatre in Edmonton.

== Awards and nominations ==
=== Original Broadway production ===
Year	Award	Category	Nominee	Result
1966	Tony Award	Best Play		Nominated
1966	Tony Award	Best Costume Design	Loudon Sainthill	Nominated
