= You've Got Possibilities =

Song by Charles Strouse and Lee Adams

Song by Linda Lavin
- Language: English
- Composer: Charles Strouse
- Lyricist: Lee Adams

"You've Got Possibilities" is an American show tune. It was created by Charles Strouse and Lee Adams for the 1966 Broadway show It's a Bird...It's a Plane...It's Superman and sung by Linda Lavin in the show. Lavin plays a secretary at the Daily Planet with a crush on Clark Kent and the song describes her hope to change Kent's mild-mannered, square persona ("Let me pry you from your shell... You've got possibilities... you don't even know you've got").

It's a Bird...It's a Plane...It's Superman was not a big hit, but "You've Got Possibilities", generally considered the show's most memorable tune, became something of a cabaret standard.

Peggy Lee recorded the song on her 1966 album Big $pender and released it as the B-side of the single "Come Back to Me". Joanie Sommers released "You've Got Possibilities" as the B-side of her single "Never Throw Your Dreams Away", also in 1966, while Carol Ventura released it also in 1966 as an A-side single.

Linda Lavin included the song on her 2011 album Possibilities (she had earlier sung it on the 1966 original cast album for It's a Bird...It's a Plane...It's Superman). Matt Monro's version appears on his Here's To My Lady (1966) and The Best of the Capitol Years (1990), Jason Graae released a version on You're Never Fully Dressed Without a Smile (1996), Wendy Coates on Journeys (2001), and Karen Akers on Like It Was (2006).

Barbara McNair recorded a version for Motown Records in 1966, but it was not released until 2016, in digital format on Motown Unreleased: 1966. Song composer Charles Strouse himself is heard singing "You've Got Possibilities" on the album Charles Sings Strouse (2006), part of the Songwriter Series produced in conjunction with the Library of Congress.

"You've Got Possibilities" was used in a 2005 television advertising campaign for Pillsbury Grand biscuits.
