= Storm Over Bengal =

1938 film directed by Sidney Salkow

- Film poster
- Directed by: Sidney Salkow
- Written by: Garrett Fort
- Produced by: Armand Schaefer
- Starring: Patric Knowles; Richard Cromwell; Rochelle Hudson
- Cinematography: Ernest Miller
- Edited by: William Morgan; Murray Seldeen
- Music by: Cy Feuer
- Production company: Republic Pictures
- Distributed by: Republic Pictures
- Release date: November 14, 1938
- Running time: 65 minutes
- Country: United States
- Language: English

Storm Over Bengal is a 1938 American adventure film that was nominated at the 11th Academy Awards for Best Score, the nomination was for Cy Feuer. Set during the British Raj, the film's working title was Bengal Lancer Patrol. The film was shot in Owens Valley, California. The film stars Patric Knowles in his first film after leaving Warner Bros. as well as Richard Cromwell and Douglass Dumbrille who played similar roles in Lives of a Bengal Lancer.

In the film, the throne of the princely state of Lhanapur is usurped by an Indian revolutionary. He tries to gain support for his planned revolt through radio broadcasts, while officers of the Royal Air Force try to undermine his plans.

== Plot ==
Two Royal Air Force officers, Flt Lt Hallett and F/O Neil Allison visit a British outpost in India. Neil is the younger brother of Army Intelligence officer Captain Jeffrey Allison who is away on an undercover mission in the unaligned and independent princely state of Lhanapur. The British are worried about radio broadcasts from Ramin Khan inciting the Indian people to revolt. Upon the impending death of the elderly Maharajah of Lhanapur, Ramin Khan schemes to usurp the throne as a base for his revolt.

Disguised as an Indian holy man, Jeffrey gathers intelligence on Ramin Khan's insurgents whilst the British send a diplomatic mission to Lhanapur who are ambushed and killed. The young Neil is himself in love with Jeffrey's fiancée Joan Lattimore and is jealous of his brother. Upon his return from Lhanapur, Jeffrey wishes to postpone his wedding so Joan can flee to safety but she remains on base with Neil. With the death of the diplomatic party, Jeffrey is flown to Lhanapur by Hallett in his aircraft to meet with the Maharajah. During the meeting, Ramin Khan captures Jeffrey and his men mortally wound Hallett who flies back to inform the British of Ramin Khan's activity. Ramin Khan is delighted as he plans to ambush the British field force in a ravine near the caves of Kali. Hallet arrives at the British base, dying after delivering his message. Neil volunteers to warn the British field force in Hallet’s plane, despite his incomplete pilot training.

Ramin Khan brings Jefferey to his broadcast radio and instructs him to deliver a false message to the viceroy that all is well in Lhanapur. Meanwhile Neil attempts to drop flares in front of the British forces before they enter the reach the ravine, but his plane is damaged in a storm and he crashes and dies. Commanding officer Colonel Torrance has his men search the crash site and they recover a written warning about Ramin Khan. Torrance halts the advance just as Ramin Khan’s forces ambush his and the two sides engage in battle. Jeffery manages to escape and holds Ramin Khan at gunpoint, broadcasting to Lhanapur that total British victory is at hand. Ramin Khan escapes and attacks Jeffery once more, who kills him and destroys his hideout as the British field force drives off the last of the rebels. After the battle, Jeffery and Joan muse on Neil’s bravery as they hold hands. Neil’s spectral hand appears briefly over theirs and the film ends.

== Cast ==
- Patric Knowles as Capt. Jeffrey Allison
- Richard Cromwell as Flying Officer Neil Allison
- Rochelle Hudson as Joan Lattimore
- Douglass Dumbrille as Ramin Khan
- Colin Tapley as Flight Lieutenant Hallett
- Gilbert Emery as Colonel Torrance
- Douglas Walton as Terry
- Halliwell Hobbes as Sir John Galt
- John Burton as Captain Carter
- Clyde Cook as Alf
- Claud Allister as Redding
- Pedro de Cordoba as Abdul Mir
- Edward Van Sloan as Maharajah of Lhanapur
