= Evelyn Ward =

American actress (1923–2012)

- Born: Evelyn Mae Ward; May 21, 1923; West Orange, New Jersey, U.S.
- Died: December 23, 2012 (aged 89); Los Angeles, California, U.S.
- Occupation: Actress
- Years active: 1949–1965
- Spouses: Jack Cassidy (m. 1948; div. 1956) Elliot Silverstein (m. 1962; div. 1968) Alton Charles (Al) Williams (died 2005)
- Children: David Cassidy
- Relatives: Katie Cassidy (granddaughter); Beau Cassidy (grandson)

Evelyn Mae Ward (May 21, 1923 – December 23, 2012) was an American actress and dancer known for her stage musical performances and television appearances. Her son was the actor-singer David Cassidy.

== Background ==
Ward was born and raised in West Orange, New Jersey, the daughter of Frederick and Ethel Laurinda (née Wheeler) Ward. Her ancestors were among the founders of Newark, New Jersey.

== Career ==
Ward began her performing career as a teenager dancing with the Roxyettes at the Roxy Theater. After understudying Mary Martin in the musical Dancing in the Streets, which closed "out of town" in the spring of 1943, Ward made her Broadway debut that summer in the musical Early to Bed. Her subsequent Broadway musical credits include The Firebrand of Florence (1945), Spring in Brazil (1945), Billion Dollar Baby (1946), and Along Fifth Avenue (1949).

Her subsequent theatrical credits were mostly in regional theater, but she did return to the Broadway musical stage in the spring of 1958, replacing Gwen Verdon in the lead role in New Girl in Town. In 1967, Ward appeared in the play And So to Bed at the LA Theater Center and her son David Cassidy also was featured in the cast. In 1996, she left retirement to co-star in Such a Pretty Face.

She also performed in nightclubs in New York City and Boston, and in 1954 performed in a Las Vegas revue.

In 1949, Ward was a regular on the CBS game show Hold It Please, and in 1950–1951, she was a regular on the ABC variety series The College Bowl (also known as The Chico Marx Show). Her other television credits include The Man from U.N.C.L.E., Ben Casey, Dr. Kildare, Perry Mason, Mike Hammer, The Further Adventures of Ellery Queen, and Hallmark Hall of Fame.

== Personal life ==
Ward married actor Jack Cassidy on June 28, 1948: the couple had met in 1945 while appearing in the Broadway musical The Firebrand of Florence. Ward and Cassidy had one son, David Bruce Cassidy, born on April 12, 1950. The family resided in Ward's native West Orange. The marriage of Jack Cassidy and Evelyn Ward ended in a Mexican divorce in July 1956.

In August 1956, Cassidy married actress Shirley Jones, with whom he had been romantically involved since the previous summer. According to Jones, Cassidy and Ward had been separated twice and then got back together prior to her meeting Cassidy, and their marriage had remained rocky.

After her divorce from Cassidy, Ward and David resided with Ward's parents in West Orange until 1961, when Ward married film director Elliot Silverstein.

Ward had known Silverstein for several years, as she had acted in Boston-area stage productions directed by Silverstein in 1955 and 1957. Ward and Silverstein divorced in 1968. Later, Ward married Al Williams, who died in 2005.

Ward is sometimes mistaken for the onetime wife of film director Norman Z. McLeod. However, the latter, Evelyn "Bunny" Ward, would have to have been a considerably older woman, given the fact that she was already a popular figure amongst Kansas City's upper crust at the outset of her nearly 4-decade-long 1926 marriage (McLeod died in 1964), and, in 1931, even had the opportunity—albeit only briefly and without credit—to portray the wife of the character played by football legend Jim Thorpe, likewise uncredited, in her husband's 1931 film, Touchdown.

== Death ==
Ward died on December 23, 2012, from complications from dementia. She was survived by her son, David (who died of liver failure on November 21, 2017), and two grandchildren, Katie Cassidy and Beau Cassidy.
