= William Ball (director) =

American stage director (1931–1991)

- Born: William Gormaly Ball; 28 April 1931; Chicago, Illinois, U.S.
- Died: 30 July 1991 (aged 60); Los Angeles, California, U.S.
- Occupation: Theatre director
- Awards: Drama Desk Awards; Outstanding Director; 1959 Ivanov

William Gormaly Ball (29 April 1931 – 30 July 1991) was an American stage director and founder of the American Conservatory Theater (ACT). He was awarded the Drama Desk Vernon Rice Award in 1959 for his production of Chekhov's Ivanov and was nominated for a Tony Award in 1965 for his production of Molière's Tartuffe, starring Michael O'Sullivan and René Auberjonois. He was also a noted director of opera.

== Biography ==
=== Early years ===
Ball was born in Chicago, Illinois, on April 29, 1931. His parents were Russell Ball and Catherine Gormaly. He has two brothers and a sister: Russell Ball, Donald Ball and Cathie Ball. He attended Iona Preparatory School and Fordham University. From 1953 through 1955, he studied acting, design, and directing at the Fine Arts School of Carnegie Institute of Technology (which later became Carnegie Mellon University).

=== Career ===
Ball founded the American Conservatory Theater in Pittsburgh in 1965. This was a company of up to 30 full-time paid actors who studied all disciplines of the theatre arts during the day and performed at night. Ball had a falling out with ACT's financial benefactors in Pittsburgh and took the company on the road. His 1966 productions of Albee's Tiny Alice, Pirandello's Six Characters in Search of an Author, and others at the Stanford University Summer Festival led a group of financiers to offer his company a home in San Francisco, which had recently lost the Actor's Workshop to New York's Lincoln Center.

In its first season, Ball's ACT produced twenty-seven full-length plays in two theatres over the course of seven months. Some actors would do one role in the early part of a play at the Geary Theatre then run two blocks up the hill to the Marines Memorial Theatre to appear in the last part of another. Ball's 1974 production of Cyrano de Bergerac and his 1976 production of The Taming of the Shrew were televised nationally on PBS. In 1979, ACT received the Tony Award for excellence in regional theatre.

Ball was often provocative. His interpretation of Albee's Tiny Alice brought threat of a lawsuit from the playwright, who tried to withhold the performance rights only to discover that they had never been granted in the first place. Some observers thought that Ball's operatic production (with an added aside condemning the Vietnam war) may have solved some problems inherent in the text.

Ball was the author of the book, A Sense of Direction: Some Observations on the Art of Directing (1984). He appeared in Suburban Commando and has a nonspeaking cameo in Foul Play as a bishop attending the pope, portrayed by ACT benefactor Cyril Magnin.

=== New York City Opera ===
At the New York City Opera, from 1959 to 1964, Ball directed productions of Weisgall's Six Characters in Search of an Author (world premiere, with Beverly Sills), Mozart's Così fan tutte (with Phyllis Curtin), Egk's The Inspector General (with the composer conducting), Gershwin's Porgy and Bess (with Julius Rudel conducting), Britten's A Midsummer Night's Dream (with Tatiana Troyanos as Hippolyta), Mozart's Don Giovanni (with Norman Treigle in the title role), and Hoiby's Natalia Petrovna (world premiere).

=== Personal life ===
On July 30, 1991, Ball died in Los Angeles, California.

== Bibliography ==
- Ball, William (1984). A Sense of Direction: Some Observations on the Art of Directing (First ed.). New York: Drama Book Publishers. ISBN 0-89676-081-2.
