= Nightmare Honeymoon =

1974 film by Elliot Silverstein

- Theatrical release poster
- Directed by: Elliot Silverstein
- Written by: Lawrence Block; S. Lee Pogostin
- Produced by: Hugh Benson
- Starring: Dack Rambo; John Beck
- Cinematography: Harry Stradling Jr.
- Edited by: Fredric Steinkamp
- Music by: Elmer Bernstein
- Production company: Metro-Goldwyn-Mayer
- Distributed by: United Artists (United States/Canada); Cinema International Corporation (International)
- Release date: September 20, 1974
- Running time: 95 minutes
- Country: United States
- Language: English

Nightmare Honeymoon is a 1974 American crime-thriller film directed by Elliot Silverstein, starring Dack Rambo and Rebecca Dianna Smith.

== Plot ==
Newlyweds David and Jill Webb want nothing more than to consummate their marriage in New Orleans. But on their way to “The Big Easy,” they witness a murder. When the sadistic killer realizes he's been caught in the act, he knocks David unconscious and rapes Jill. Eventually, David learns the story of his wife's assault and sets out on a relentless vendetta to find the rapist and his partner and bring them to justice.

== Cast ==
- Dack Rambo as David Webb
- Rebecca Dianna Smith as Jill Binghamton Webb
- John Beck as Lee
- Pat Hingle as Mr. Binghamton
- Roy Jenson as Sandy
- David Huddleston as Pete Carroll
- Jay Robinson as Ruskin
- Dennis Patrick as John Kenmore
- Dennis Burkley as Bubba

== Reception ==
Hal C.F. Astell of Apocalypse Later website said, "No, this is not intelligent stuff and I'm not even sure why it's (still available). Maybe it's because Elliot Silverstein, a director more prolific on TV than cinema screens, also made such cult favourites as Cat Ballou, A Man Called Horse and The Car. ... John Beck is the best reason to watch this film, even though he could easily have won the Best Overactor award that year with his bug eyes and twitches. He's just plain old fun to watch and by the time we get to the finale I half expected Jill to run to him instead of her idiot husband..."
