= Elliot Silverstein =

American director (1927–2023)

- Born: August 3, 1927; Boston, Massachusetts, U.S.
- Died: November 24, 2023 (aged 96); Los Angeles, California, U.S.
- Occupation: Director
- Years active: 1954–1994
- Notable work: Cat Ballou; The Happening; A Man Called Horse
- Spouses: Evelyn Ward (m. 1962; div. 1968) Alana King (divorced)

Elliot Silverstein (August 3, 1927 – November 24, 2023) was an American film and television director. He directed the Academy Award-winning western comedy Cat Ballou (1965), and other films including The Happening (1967), A Man Called Horse (1970), Nightmare Honeymoon (1974), and The Car (1977). His television work includes four episodes of The Twilight Zone (1961–1964).

== Career ==
Silverstein was born in Boston on August 3, 1927; he was raised in Dorchester. The son of a doctor, he initially pursued study at Boston College in biology but changed his major to drama.

Elliot Silverstein was the director of six feature films in the mid-twentieth century. The most famous of these by far is Cat Ballou, a comedy-western starring Jane Fonda and Lee Marvin.

The other Silverstein films, in chronological order, are The Happening, A Man Called Horse, Nightmare Honeymoon, The Car, and Flashfire.

Other work included directing for the television shows The Twilight Zone, The Nurses, Picket Fences, and Tales from the Crypt.

While Silverstein was not a prolific director, his films were often rewarded. Cat Ballou, for instance, earned an Academy Award and was nominated for four more.

It was his experiences with not being able to make his own cut when filming an episode on television that spurred him to push for a "director's cut". He urged Directors Guild of America president George Sidney to make a committee in late 1963 to meet up about the matter, which Silverstein chaired that included members such as Robert Altman and Sydney Pollack. The "Bill of Creative Rights" stated the following: "The arrangement of the recorded images and sounds in a relationship the Director considers proper shall be known as the ‘Director’s Cut. It is the Director’s creative right and obligation to prepare this cut, and he must be given the time he deems necessary to fulfill this function.” In the fall of 1964, the Bill of Creative Rights was included in the new DGA contract with producers.

== Personal life and death ==
Silverstein was married three times, each ending in divorce. His first marriage was to Evelyn Ward in 1962; the couple divorced in 1968. His second marriage was to Alana King. During his first marriage, he was the stepfather of David Cassidy.

Silverstein lived in North Hollywood, Los Angeles. Actively retired, Silverstein had taught film at USC and continued to work on screenplays and other projects. He died in Los Angeles on November 24, 2023, at the age of 96.

== Awards ==
In 1965, at the 15th Berlin International Film Festival, he won the Youth Film Award – Honorable Mention, in the category of Best Feature Film Suitable for Young People for Cat Ballou. He was also nominated for the Golden Berlin Bear.

In 1966, he was nominated for the DGA Award in the category for Outstanding Directorial Achievement in Motion Pictures (Cat Ballou).

In 1971, he won the Bronze Wrangler award at the Western Heritage Awards in the category of Theatrical Motion Picture for A Man Called Horse, along with producer Sandy Howard, writer Jack DeWitt, and actors Judith Anderson, Jean Gascon, Corinna Tsopei and Richard Harris.

In 1985, he won the Robert B. Aldrich Achievement Award from the Directors Guild of America.

In 1990, he was awarded the DGA Honorary Life Member Award.

== Filmography ==
- Flashfire (1994)
- Tales from the Crypt (TV series) (1991–94)
- Picket Fences (TV series) (1993)
- Rich Men, Single Women (TV movie) (1990)
- Fight for Life (TV movie) (1987)
- Night of Courage (TV movie) (1987)
- Betrayed by Innocence (TV movie) (1986)
- The Firm (TV series) (1982–1983)
- The Car (1977)
- Nightmare Honeymoon (1974)
- A Man Called Horse (1970)
- The Happening (1967)
- Cat Ballou (1965)
- Kraft Suspense Theatre (TV series) (1963–64)
- The Defenders (TV series) (1962–64)
- Arrest and Trial (TV series) (1964)
- The Doctors and the Nurses (TV series) (1962–64)
- Twilight Zone (TV series) (1961–64)
- Breaking Point (TV series) (1963)
- Dr. Kildare (TV series) (1961–63)
- The Dick Powell Theatre (TV series) (1962)
- Belle Sommers (TV movie) (1962)
- Naked City (TV series) (1961–62)
- Have Gun - Will Travel (TV series) (1961)
- Route 66 (TV series) (1960–61)
- Checkmate (TV series) (1961)
- The Westerner (TV series) (1960)
- Assignment: Underwater (TV series) (1960)
- Black Saddle (TV series) (1960)
- Suspicion (TV series) (1958)
- Omnibus (TV series) (1954–56)
