= Wish You Were Here (musical) =

Musical with a book

- Original Cast Recording
- Music: Harold Rome
- Lyrics: Harold Rome
- Book: Arthur Kober; Joshua Logan
- Basis: Arthur Kober play, Having Wonderful Time
- Productions: 1952 Broadway; 1953 West End

Wish You Were Here is a musical with a book by Arthur Kober and Joshua Logan and music and lyrics by Harold Rome. The musical was adapted from Kober's 1937 play, Having Wonderful Time, and revolves around a summer camp for adults. It is known for the song "Wish You Were Here".

== Synopsis ==
=== Act I ===
The show opens with a P.A. announcement welcoming a busload of new guests to Camp Karefree, a two-week summer camp for adults in the Catskills. Camp host Lou Kandel gives the newcomers, mostly women, the rundown of the place; first, he introduces the waiters, mostly college men. Then he tells everyone the two rules - Camp Karefree cares for you, and when the lights flicker the girls go to the girls' side and the boys go to the boys' ("Camp Karefree Song").

Enter Teddy Stern, a young woman soon to be wed to a stuffy, older man: Herman Fabricant. Teddy has been crying uncontrollably since her engagement, so her doctor suggested she get some rest before the wedding. Teddy's friend Fay, a screwball blonde, meets her and takes her under her wing. Herman leaves. After he is gone, Teddy confesses she is having second thoughts about her marriage, and that is why the doctor said she needed a change. With that, Fay takes Teddy's wedding ring - just for the time that they are at camp - so Teddy can have a real change. Fay introduces the now "single" Teddy to her friends ("There's Nothing Nicer Than People"). Teddy then meets Itchy Flexner, the social director who does it all: imitations, singing, dancing, and telling stories. He just loves to entertain ("Social Director"). He engages the entire camp with his talent. An announcement over the loudspeaker tells everyone to change for dinner. As she heads to her cabin, Teddy meets Pinky Harris - a dashing, womanizing fellow who takes an interest in her. After Teddy has changed for dinner, she notices Fay flirting with Harry "Muscles" Green - the new athletic director. It seems that Fay has her eye on every available man at Camp Karefree. She confesses that she just loves to flirt ("Shopping Around"). The scene shifts to the locker room for the waiters listlessly wipe the water glasses and reflect on what they have to do to put themselves through school ("Bright College Days").

Kandel enters and reminds the waiters that part of their job is to entertain the ladies - all of them, not just the pretty ones - by dancing and talking with them. Chick, a law student, is tired of being a waiter by day and gigolo by night - he wants to meet a real girl, not these eager beavers, as he calls them, at Camp Karefree. But the boys remind him it is either socializing or getting fired ("Mix and Mingle"). On the Social Hall Porch, the girls want to dance, but the men are playing poker. When the waiters arrive, the girls rush inside excitedly to dance with them. Teddy, however, does not feel like dancing. She listens to the other girls speculate that tonight could be the night they fall in love, looks at her ring finger, and starts crying ("Could Be"). Chick casually enters and stands unaware of Teddy. Schmutz, one of Itchy's assistants, enters and tells Chick that he better start dancing because word has gotten back to Kandel that Chick would not dance with one of the girls. Chick quickly convinces the reluctant Teddy to dance with him just as Kandel enters. Inside the social hall, Itchy directs everyone in a get-acquainted dance ("Tripping the Light Fantastic").

In the end, ready to escort her home, Chick is still with Teddy and thanks her for getting him out of a tight spot. It is here that Pinky makes it very evident that he has designs on Teddy. In fact, he wants Itchy to help him survey the situation and see just how he can lure Teddy to him. Itchy agrees - on the condition Pinky gets him a TV audition. Next, Muscles comes over and asks Itchy for advice on wooing a girl. Itchy is happy to oblige, until he finds out the girl is Fay who Itchy also wants! To Itchy's dismay, Muscles and Fay leave together. ("Social Director - Reprise"). Walking through the woods, Chick and Teddy hear the band playing the song Chick sang in the waiter's show last year. It is about a boy and a girl who met at camp, and the following season she did not come back ("Wish You Were Here"). They run into Fay who had gone to Eagle Rock with Muscles but was interrupted by a scheming Itchy. When she leaves, Chick explains that he cannot get involved with Teddy - he is putting all his time and attention towards Law School.

Teddy understands, she too cannot get involved, though she does not tell Chick the reason why. Chick thinks this is perfect. Chick has trouble with the socializing part of his job because all of the girls he is supposed to romance want long-term contact. Since Teddy does not, he asks her if she will spend the next two weeks with him. She happily agrees. They dance the last dance of the evening together and go off to bed - alone ("Where Did the Night Go"). A week later, Muscles is exhausting everyone on the athletic field. Itchy has to cancel evening activities because everyone is too tired to show up. Kandel tells Itchy that if the social events do not pick up, Itchy will lose his job as social director. Meanwhile, Pinky tells Teddy he has just ordered a new formal dress in her size that is meant to be the prize for the Miss Karefree bathing beauty contest. He is one of the judges and wants her to enter. Teddy ignores this obvious pass and goes off with Chick.

Fay flirts with Muscles and Itchy gets increasingly jealous. Teddy and Chick return on Chick's bicycle and are greeted by the entire camp. Though they see their relationship as a friendship, everyone else sees a blossoming romance ("Certain Individuals"). Everyone leaves except for the spurned Itchy who watches Fay ride off on Muscles' shoulders. Itchy decides that he has got to get some new social ideas that will excite the girls. He decides to have a candlelight evening in the social hall. He figures that will be so romantic that all the girls will forget Muscles and his sports events. Unfortunately, his plan backfires when the Social Hall catches fire. Kandel is so mad at Itchy that he demotes him to Boat House Boy and puts Muscles in charge of all social events.

The next day Chick takes Teddy out to Eagle Rock, yelling at Pinky to stay away from her. When Teddy asks what has come over him, Chick reveals that he loves Teddy. He proposes marriage and imagines how his friends would react to their going out together to museums and cultural events ("They Won't Know Me"). Teddy tells Chick that not only is she already engaged, but she is also meant to get married next week. Even though she, too, loves Chick she cannot call off the wedding. Rather than talk any more about it, they go back to the camp. Back at the boathouse, we find Itchy has been demoted to Boat Boy. Teddy and Chick return from Eagle Rock and Chick confronts Fay about Teddy's engagement. She confesses that she knew all along that Teddy was engaged and gives Teddy her ring back. The girls enter in their bathing suits - ready for the Miss Camp Karefree Contest. Gussie, one of the available girls rushes forward and shows Chick that she has no ring on her finger. He asks her out and plans on cheering for her in the contest. Teddy, hurt, decides that she too will enter the contest, in retaliation. Pinky is thrilled to have the chance to put the moves on Teddy ("Summer Afternoon"). Pinky naturally picks Teddy to win the contest. He shows her the gorgeous new dress. In return, she gives him a kiss, and in a jealous fit, Chick pushes Pinky into the pool.

Kandel has Chick restrained and threatens to fire him. Pinky delights in watching this happen to Chick and laughs. Teddy, upset at seeing Chick humiliated, pushes Pinky into the pool. Nevertheless, Chick still leaves with Gussie and Teddy watches them go, crying.

=== Act II ===
The act opens the evening after the beauty contest with the camp sitting around a campfire ("Where Did the Night Go? - Reprise"). Fay returns to tell Pinky that Teddy will not meet him. She is too ashamed of the way things have gone. Teddy's been talking to her mother in New York, and Fay suspects that Herman may be back to pick Teddy up soon. Pinky thinks if Teddy hears them having fun, she will come to join them. Itchy performs a rousing number that he hopes will both draw out Teddy and win Fay back ("Don Jose").

Unfortunately, Fay ends up kissing Muscles at the end of the song. Itchy has a jealous fight with Muscles over Fay. She breaks up the fight. Chick returns to apologize to Pinky though there still is a great deal of tension between the two of them. Fay passes drinks to around to the fighting men and tells them just to get along for tonight ("Everybody Love Everybody"). When Teddy's name is called over the P.A. to come and get her long-distance call, Pinky convinces Chick to sing to Teddy. Swallowing his drink, he does ("Wish You Were Here"). Teddy enters the scene and sees Chick though the two do not speak. Gussie quickly laps up Chick when he finishes singing and Pinky tries to get Teddy drunk and take her back to his cabin. Before anything more happens, it starts raining and everyone runs for cover. Teddy stops by Pinky's cabin ostensibly to pick up an umbrella, but he has other ideas. He spikes Teddy's drink and attempts to take advantage of her ("Relax"). Itchy comes over to talk with Pinky and a panicked Teddy hides in the bathroom while Pinky attempts to get rid of Itchy.

By the time Itchy leaves, Teddy has emerged from the bathroom with an empty glass wearing the sexy dress she won in the beauty contest. Chick enters the bunk with Teddy's engagement ring and finding her there attempts to force the ring on her finger. If she is engaged, she should act like it. She tells him to mind his own business. He puts the ring on the night table and leaves. Pinky prepares to take her to bed; unfortunately, while he is in the bathroom getting changed, she falls asleep. Pinky, not knowing what else to do, slips the engagement ring on Teddy's hand. The next morning outside the social hall, Herman has come to bring Teddy home. No one seems to know where Teddy is, and Herman is not too happy about this. Itchy and Marvin also bemoan the fact that their girlfriends are nowhere to be found. They then realize that the girls have spent the whole night dancing to Be-Bop records in the music library. Fay and some of the other kids enter dancing like "cool cats" ("Where Did the Night Go? - Be-bop Version"). Muscles take the guests off to play basketball, and Teddy enters, finding Herman. It appears that even though nothing happened between Teddy and Pinky, Pinky is out accepting congratulations for his conquest. Even though Herman should not accept Teddy's behavior, he is ready to forgive and forget. He wants to take Teddy back to New York where the two can get married.

She goes to get the car. Itchy returns to tell everyone that he has been fired from his job as Boat Boy, too. He forgot to tie up the boats last night during the storm and they all floated away. Teddy spots Chick escorting a new girl to her cabin and informs him that she is leaving. He is aloof but polite. Itchy, overhearing the conversation, chastises Teddy for not putting up a fight. Chick does not even know the truth about what happened between her and Pinky. Itchy wants her to go over to the big camp basketball game and make Pinky, the referee, tell the truth. Teddy is flattered that Itchy cares so much. His kind words really give her a lift. And she returns the sentiment in kind ("Flattery"). She agrees to go to the game. In the game, the camp team (led by Muscles) plays the waiter team (led by Chick). Itchy arrives and disrupts the game so badly that Muscles declares the game officially over.

Teddy confronts Pinky and asks him why he is telling everyone she succumbed to him last night. He claims that he did no such thing; however, the rest of the camp is having a great time insinuating that Teddy is now a loose woman. Pinky resists because he does not want to tarnish his reputation, but Fay gets him to tell the truth. Herman hears this and is relieved. Teddy gives a kiss to Chick and gets in the car and leaves with Herman. It is obvious that she does not want to go, but Chick does nothing to stop her. Muscles, frustrated with the interruption of his game, he quits on the spot. Kandel panics! Who is going to run the camp? Itchy, of course! Itchy immediately organize everyone to dance. Suddenly, Herman re-enters with two suitcases, which he lays down. Teddy runs to Chick and falls into his arms. Before Herman goes, however, he gives Chick the engagement ring, which Chick slips on Teddy's finger ("Wish You Were Here - Reprise").

== Songs ==
Act 1

- "Camp Karefree" – Lou Kandel, Waiters and Ensemble
- "Goodbye Love" – Teddy Stern, Fay Fromkin and Girls
- "Social Director" – Itchy Flexner and Ensemble
- "Shopping Around" – Fay Fromkin
- "Bright College Days" – Waiters
- "Mix and Mingle" – Chick Miller and Waiters
- "Could Be" – Teddy Stern and Girls
- "Tripping the Light Fantastic" – Ensemble
- "(Ballad of a) Social Director" (Reprise)- Itchy Flexner and
- "Where Did the Night Go?" – Chick Miller, Teddy Stern and Ensemble
- "Certain Individuals" – Fay Fromkin and Ensemble
- "They Won't Know Me" – Chick Miller
- "Summer Afternoon" – Pinky Harris and Ensemble

Act 2

- "Where Did the Night Go?" (Reprise) – Eli and Ensemble
- "Don Jose (of Far Rockaway)" – Itchy Flexner and Ensemble
- "Everybody Love Everybody" – Fay Fromkin and Ensemble
- "Wish You Were Here" – Chick Miller and Waiters
- "Relax" – Pinky Harris and Teddy Stern
- "Where Did the Night Go?" (Be-Bop Version)- Fay Fromkin and Ensemble
- "Flattery" – Teddy Stern and Itchy Flexner
- "Finale" – Entire Company

== Productions ==
The Broadway production opened at the Imperial Theatre on June 25, 1952, and closed on November 28, 1953, after 598 performances. Directed and choreographed by Logan, uncredited show doctoring was by Jerome Robbins, with scenic and lighting design by Jo Mielziner. The cast included Patricia Marand as Teddy Stern, Jack Cassidy as Chick Miller, Phyllis Newman as Sarah, Larry Blyden, Harry Clark as Herman Fabricant, Florence Henderson, Reid Shelton, Tom Tryon, Sheila Bond as Fay Fromkin, John Perkins as Harry "Muscles" Green, Sidney Armus (as Itchy Flexner), and Paul Valentine. (Original cast member George Lenz is the grandfather of One Tree Hill actress Bethany Joy Lenz.)

The elaborate set included a fully functional swimming pool.

The West End production opened on October 10, 1953, at the London Casino, where it ran for 282 performances.

The Equity Library Theatre (New York City) off-off-Broadway revival ran in May 1987.

The York Theatre Company Musicals in Mufti series presented their concert version of the show in January 2000.

== Recordings ==
The original Broadway cast album was released by RCA Victor. Stage Door Records re-issued the Broadway original cast recording in 2008. Sepia Records re-issued the London cast album in 2004 (Sepia 1030).

Eddie Fisher recorded the title song, and it reached No. 1 on the charts.

== Response ==
Ken Bloom, in his book The Routledge Guide to Broadway wrote that the initial reviews were not positive, and the creative people worked on strengthening the book. As good word-of-mouth built an audience, some critics returned to review the show again, and it had a long run. In his book JOSH (1976), Joshua Logan recalls urging Harold Rome, after several attempts, to create a hit song. Eddie Fisher's record of the title song played a large part, along with book rewrites, to reverse the fortunes of the play. A key change was to develop Herman Fabricant's character, as Teddy's returning his engagement ring early in the piece tarnished her character and prevented conflict and development. According to Cecil Michener Smith and Glenn Litton (in their book Musical Comedy in America), the original "warmth and unpretentiousness" of the original play were lost in the "monumental stage spectacle. Their new wonder featured a center-stage swimming pool and every other extravagance for which they could invent an excuse: a basketball game... a fire...and a rain storm." The critics, "even the dispassionate ones, growled their disgust." In addition to rewriting the book, they brought Jerome Robbins in to "restage the dances and add a new ballet" and Rome added a new song.

In 1952, the original Broadway cast performed on The Ed Sullivan Show which, at the time, was known as Toast of the Town. This appearance by the cast played a major role in the show's ultimate success. An excerpt from the book, A Really Big Show: A Visual History of the Ed Sullivan Show notes: "The musical comedy, Wish You Were Here, was dead in the summer humidity until the producer sent its stars to rescue it on Sullivan. Ed even had one of the show's first sets constructed to accommodate those stars: A replica of a swimming pool, with mirrors to simulate depth. The next day, lines formed early at the theater, the closing notice came down, and Wish You Were Here lasted 587 additional performances" (eleven performances had already taken place).

Wish You Were Here launched the show business career of Florence Henderson who is best known to the world as Carol Brady (the matriarch) on the long-running ABC-TV sitcom The Brady Bunch. In her chorus role as "The New Girl" (which she originated), Henderson had but one line to deliver. That one line, which started it all for her, was: "Can I see the game?"

== Awards and nominations ==
Sheila Bond won the Tony Award for Best Featured Actress in a Musical. Abe Kurnit won the Tony Award for Best Stage Technician (a retired category).
