= Flashfire (film) =

- Directed by: Elliot Silverstein
- Starring: Billy Zane; Louis Gossett Jr.
- Release date: 1993
- Running time: 84 minutes 89 minutes
- Country: United States
- Language: English

Flashfire is a 1993 American action crime thriller film directed by Elliot Silverstein and starring Billy Zane and Louis Gossett Jr.

== Cast ==
- Billy Zane as Jack Flinder
- Louis Gossett Jr. as Ben Durand
- Kristin Minter as Lisa Cates
- Louis Giambalvo as Al Sherwin
- Tom Mason as Art Cantrell
- Gregory Millar as Paulie
- Ric Drasin as Kraus von Zeck
- Caroline Williams as Ann
- Mimi Kennedy as Kate Cantrell
- Arthur Hansel as Ralph Flinder

== Production ==
The film was shot in Los Angeles.

== Release ==
The film was released direct-to-video in 1995.

== Reception ==
TV Guide gave the film a negative review: "Although it adequately sets up its complicated (if cliched) storyline, it falls apart in the last reel, particularly in Gossett's vaguely motivated switch to a bad guy (it has something to do with him losing his life savings in one of the burned buildings)."

David Parkinson of Radio Times awarded the film two stars out of five and wrote, "Carelessly directed by Elliot Silverstein (whose previous work includes Cat Ballou and A Man Called Horse), this muddled tale of corruption and conspiracy comes to an abrupt and highly unsatisfactory conclusion."
