= Skyscraper (musical) =

- Original Recording
- Music: Jimmy Van Heusen
- Lyrics: Sammy Cahn
- Book: Peter Stone
- Productions: 1965 Broadway

Skyscraper is a musical that ran on Broadway in 1965 and 1966. The book was written by Peter Stone, and the music by Jimmy Van Heusen with lyrics by Sammy Cahn. Based on the 1945 Elmer Rice play Dream Girl, the Broadway production starred Julie Harris in her first musical.

== Background ==
Skyscraper opened on Broadway at the Lunt-Fontanne Theatre on November 13, 1965, and closed on June 11, 1966, after 248 performances and 22 previews. The previews had begun in October. The musical was directed by Cy Feuer and choreographed by Michael Kidd. Prior to Broadway, the show was performed September 13 through Oct 15, 1965 at the Fisher Theater in Detroit. The cast included Julie Harris, Peter Marshall, and Charles Nelson Reilly.

== Synopsis ==
The story is of Georgina, an antiques dealer who is determined to save her midtown Manhattan brownstone from the bulldozer. The girders of a new skyscraper are stalking her, and she has been offered $165,000 for her Rutherford B. Hayes-era building. When she can manage to stay on track, Georgina is bright in her thinking and staunch in her beliefs. But far too often she strays into a Walter Mitty-like dream world full of funny fantasies with her effete shop assistant.

== Original cast and characters ==
Character	Broadway (1965)	Off-Broadway (2024)
Georgina Allerton	Julie Harris	Rachel Lauren James
Lucy Allerton	Nancy Cushman	Sydney Michele Castiglione
William Allerton	Donald Burr	Shea Pender
Charlotte	Lesley Stewart	Abby Scalici
Roger Summerhill	Charles Nelson Reilly	Brian C. Veith
Stanley	Rex Everhart	Katryna Marttala
Herbert Bushman	Dick O'Neill	Jeff Raab
Timothy Bushman	Peter Marshall	Travis Leland

== Songs ==
Act I

- Occasional Flight of Fancy - Georgina And Officials
- Run For Your Life - Timothy Bushman and Herbert Bushman
- Local 403 - Stanley, Construction Workers and Girls
- Opposites - Georgina and Timothy Bushman
- Run For Your Life (Reprise) - Timothy Bushman
- Just the Crust - Roger Summerhill and Herbert Bushman
- Everybody Has a Right to Be Wrong - Georgina and Timothy Bushman
- Wrong! - Georgina, Mrs Allerton, Charlotte and Customers
- The Auction - Customers
- Occasional Flight of Fancy (Reprise) - Georgina

Act II

- The Gaiety - Customers
- More Than One Way - Timothy Bushman And Construction Workers
- Haute Couture - Stanley, Models And Construction Workers
- Don't Worry - Roger Summerhill and Herbert Bushman
- Don't Worry (Reprise) - Georgina and Roger Summerhill
- I'll Only Miss Her When I Think of Her - Timothy Bushman
- Spare That Building - Georgina, Timothy Bushman, Roger Summerhill and Company

An original cast album was released by Capitol Records.

== Critical reception ==
The newspaper columnist Dorothy Kilgallen attended a preview performance and wrote, "even the politest could not work up much enthusiasm for this new musical comedy. It contains Julie Harris, quite inexplicably, since she is not a musical comedy performer, Charles Nelson Reilly, who does everything but set fire to his trousers to get laughs where none are written in the libretto, one marvelous construction company ballet in the first act which should open the show, but doesn't, no music to sing of, and a lot of costumes that imitate last year's Courreges."

Skyscraper officially opened to mixed reviews. Despite stiff competition from Hello, Dolly!, Mame, Man of La Mancha, and Sweet Charity, the production ran for 248 performances and was nominated for five Tony Awards, including Best Musical and Best Actress in a Musical.

The New York Times reviewer wrote that Georgina's daydreams "have become broadly comic cartoons of romance, among the funniest moments in a brash, fast-moving musical. ... Not all the songs have wit and melodic grace... [the] book is smart and timely. ... Julie Harris moves Georgina as well as herself into a musical with commanding confidence."

== Awards and nominations ==
=== Original Broadway production ===
Year	Award	Category	Nominee	Result
1966	Tony Award	Best Musical		Nominated
1966	Tony Award	Best Performance by a Leading Actress in a Musical	Julie Harris	Nominated
1966	Tony Award	Best Direction of a Musical	Cy Feuer	Nominated
1966	Tony Award	Best Choreography	Michael Kidd	Nominated
1966	Tony Award	Best Scenic Design	Robert Randolph	Nominated

== 2024 Revival ==
In 2024, Skyscraper received its first-ever Off-Broadway revival. This production was directed and choreographed by Avital Asuleen and presented by Regeneration Theatre and Combustion Collective, in association with Nelda Yaw Buckman. The revival ran at Urban Stages from November 7 to November 17, 2024.

The musical retained its original book by Peter Stone, music by Jimmy Van Heusen, and lyrics by Sammy Cahn. Adapted from Elmer Rice's play Dream Girl, Skyscraper originally focused on an antique shop owner confronting urban development in 1960s New York City.

The cast for the revival featured Rachel Lauren James as Georgina Allerton, Travis Murad Leland as Tim Bushman, Brian C. Veith as Roger Summerhill, Jeff Raab as Bert Bushman, and Katryna Marttala as Stanley. They were joined by Sydney Michele Castiglione as Mrs. Allerton, Shea Pender as Mr. Allerton, Abby Scalici as Charlotte, and ensemble members included Aixa Borgetti, Curtis J. Faulkner, Jeff Gallup, Jackson Murrieta, and Katherine Winter. Notably, the revival restored two songs that were cut during the original 1965 production, providing new content for musical theatre enthusiasts.

Barnaby Edwards, the lead producer of Regeneration Theatre, stated that reviving Skyscraper was a long-held aspiration, citing its vibrant score and comedy as aspects that resonate with contemporary audiences. The production highlighted Van Heusen and Cahn's distinctive musical style, known for their association with iconic performers such as Frank Sinatra.
