= Cy Feuer =

American musician

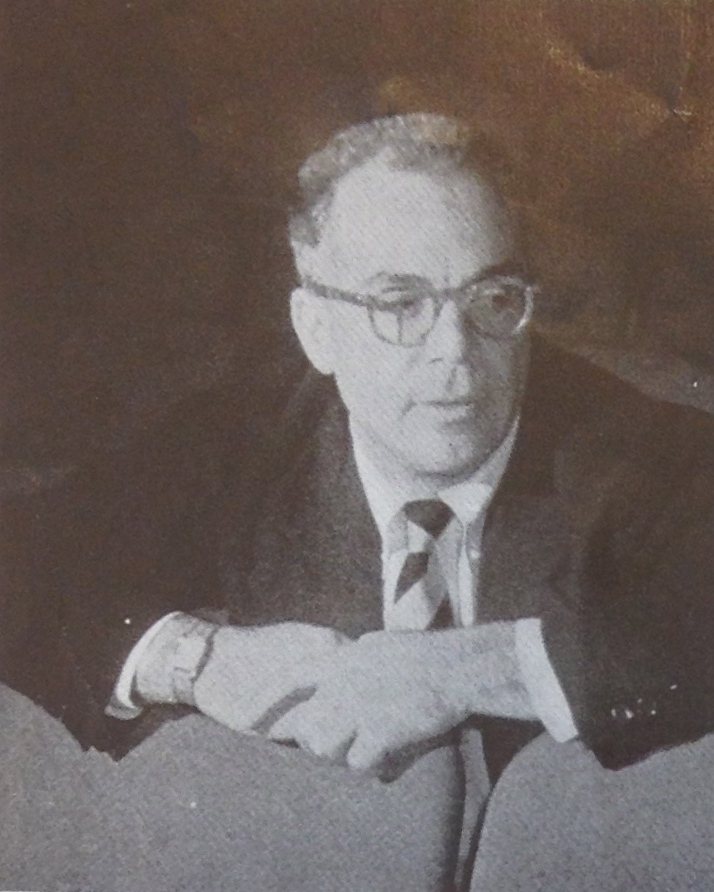
- Born: Seymour Arnold Feuerman; January 15, 1911; Brooklyn, New York City, U.S.
- Died: May 17, 2006 (aged 95); Manhattan, New York City, U.S.
- Education: Juilliard School
- Occupations: Theatre producer; theatre director; composer; musician, film producer
- Spouse: Posy Greenberg (m. 1946)
- Children: 1

Cyrus "Cy" Feuer (born Seymour Arnold Feuerman; January 15, 1911 – May 17, 2006) was an American theatre producer, director, composer, musician, and half of the celebrated producing duo Feuer and Martin. He won three competitive Antoinette Perry Awards for Excellence in Theatre, and a Lifetime Achievement Tony Award. He was also nominated for Academy Awards as the producer of Storm Over Bengal and Cabaret.

== Background ==
Born Seymour Arnold Feuerman in Brooklyn, New York, he became a professional trumpeter at the age of fifteen, working at clubs on weekends to help support his family while attending New Utrecht High School. It was there he first met Abe Burrows, who in later years he would hire to write the book for Guys and Dolls.

== Career ==
Having no interest in mathematics, science, or sports, he dropped out of school and found work as a trumpeter on a political campaign truck. He later studied at the Juilliard School before joining the orchestras at the Roxy Theater and later Radio City Music Hall.

In August 1937, in Los Angeles, he took the position as KEHE radio's music director. By that time he had also been the personal arranger for Gertrude Niesen and a musical director for Brunswick Records.

In 1938, he toured the country with Leon Belasco and His Society Orchestra, eventually ending up in Burbank, California. Following a ten-week stint there, the orchestra departed for Minneapolis, but he opted to remain in California.

Feuer found employment at Republic Pictures, serving as musical director, arranger, and/or composer of more than 125 mostly B-movies, many of them serials and westerns, for the next decade, save for a three-year interruption to serve in the military during World War II.

During his Hollywood sojourn, he enjoyed a tumultuous one-year affair with actress Susan Hayward (also from Brooklyn), worked with Jule Styne, Frank Loesser, and Victor Young, among others, received five Academy Award nominations for his film scores, and married a divorcée, Posy Greenberg, a mother of a three-year-old son. The couple later had a son of their own named Jed.

In 1947, having decided he had no real talent for film scoring, Feuer returned to New York City, where he teamed up with Ernest H. Martin, who had been the head of comedy programming at CBS Radio. After an aborted attempt to stage a production based on George Gershwin's An American in Paris, they produced Where's Charley?, the 1949 Frank Loesser adaption of Charley's Aunt. Although it was panned by six of the seven major New York critics, positive word-of-mouth about the show, particularly Ray Bolger's star turn in it, kept it running for three years.

Over the next several decades, Feuer & Martin mounted some of the most notable titles in the Broadway musical canon, including Guys and Dolls and How to Succeed in Business Without Really Trying, both of which won the Tony Award for Best Musical. As of 2026, How to Succeed... is one of only ten musicals to have won the Pulitzer Prize for Drama. Feuer and Martin owned the Lunt-Fontanne Theatre from 1960 to 1965.

Feuer was also a stage director. Among his Broadway directing credits were Little Me and the ill-fated I Remember Mama.

As a film producer, Feuer's most successful venture was his 1972 adaptation of Kander & Ebb's 1966 musical Cabaret. The movie was nominated for 10 Academy Awards and went to win eight Academy Awards, but Feuer lost Best Picture to The Godfather, giving Cabaret the distinction of the most Oscar-honored film to lose the top prize. As the movie's producer, Feuer won a Golden Globe for Best Musical or Comedy. With Martin, he was responsible for the 1985 screen adaptation of A Chorus Line, which proved to be one of their biggest flops.

Feuer served as president, and later chairman, of the League of American Theatres and Producers (now called The Broadway League) from 1989 to 2003.

== Personal life and death ==
In 1946, Feuer married Posy Greenberg. The couple had a son together, and he became a stepfather to her son from a prior marriage.

Feuer changed his forename from Seymour to Cyrus, but continued to use the nickname "Cy".

Feuer's memoir, I Got The Show Right Here: The Amazing, True Story of How an Obscure Brooklyn Horn Player Became the Last Great Broadway Showman, written with Ken Gross, was published by Simon & Schuster in 2003.

He died from bladder cancer at his home in Manhattan, New York, on May 17, 2006, at the age of 95.

== Additional Broadway credits ==
- Can-Can (1953)
- The Boy Friend (1954)
- Silk Stockings (1955)
- Whoop-Up (1958)
- Hamlet (1964)
- Skyscraper (1965)
- Walking Happy (1966)
- The Act (1977)
- I Remember Mama (1979)

== Awards and nominations ==
Year	Award	Category	Work	Result
1939	Academy Award	Best Music, Scoring	Storm Over Bengal	Nominated
1940	Academy Award	Best Music, Scoring	She Married a Cop	Nominated
1941	Academy Award	Best Music, Score	Hit Parade of 1941	Nominated
1942	Academy Award	Best Music, Scoring of a Motion Picture	Ice-Capades	Nominated
1942	Academy Award	Best Music, Scoring of a Dramatic Picture	Mercy Island (shared with Walter Scharf)	Nominated
1951	Tony Award	Best Producer of a Musical	Guys and Dolls	Won
1962	Tony Award	Best Producer of a Musical	How to Succeed in Business Without Really Trying	Won
1963	Tony Award	Best Producer of a Musical	Little Me	Nominated
1963	Tony Award	Best Direction of Musical	Little Me	Nominated
1966	Tony Award	Best Direction of Musical	Skyscraper	Nominated
1973	Academy Award	Best Picture	Cabaret	Nominated
2003	Tony Award	Lifetime Achievement Award	—N/a	Won

== Selected filmography ==
- Storm Over Bengal (1938) - nominated for an Academy Award
- Woman Doctor (1939)
- Sabotage (1939)
- Sis Hopkins (1941) (with Susan Hayward, Bob Crosby and the Bobcats band; songs by Frank Loesser and Jule Styne )
- Sons of the Pioneers (1942)
- Man from Cheyenne (1942)
- Cabaret (1972) - nominated for the Academy Award for Best Picture
- Piaf (1974)

== Sources ==
- Feuer, Cy; Gross, Ken (2003). I Got the Show Right Here. Simon & Schuster. ISBN 978-0-7432-3611-9.
