= Generation (play) =

- Written by: William Goodhart
- Original language: English
- Genre: comedy

Premiere
- Date premiered: October 6, 1965
- Place premiered: Morosco Theatre

Generation is a 1965 Broadway play written lyrics and by William Goodhart, directed by Gene Saks, produced by Frederick Brisson and Victor Samrock, incidental music by Jerry Bock, stage and lighting design by George Jenkins, costume design by Albert Wolsky.

Its first preview opened with Henry Fonda in the lead role on September 29, 1965, at the Morosco Theatre. The play official premiered on October 6, 1965, at the same theatre. It ran for 300 performances, and was nominated for a Tony Award in 1966 for the Best Featured Actor in a Play (for A. Larry Haines).
