= It's a Bird... It's a Plane... It's Superman =

1966 Broadway musical based on Superman

- Original Broadway cast recording
- Music: Charles Strouse
- Lyrics: Lee Adams
- Book: David Newman; Robert Benton
- Basis: Superman by: Jerry Siegel; Joe Shuster
- Productions: 1966 Broadway; 1975 ABC TV special 2007 Los Angeles Concert; 2010 Dallas; 2013 New York City Encores! 2014 London; 2015 West End; 2016 Germany

It's a Bird... It's a Plane... It's Superman is a 1966 musical composed by Charles Strouse, with lyrics by Lee Adams and book by David Newman and Robert Benton. It is based on the comic book character Superman created by Jerry Siegel and Joe Shuster and published by DC Comics.

While the show's original Broadway run was well-reviewed, it did not catch on with audiences. Closing after three and a half months and costing an unprecedented $600,000, the show was Broadway's biggest flop at the time. These numbers have been disputed, with Hal Prince reporting that the show was capitalized at $400,000; other shows had proven to be bigger flops.

== Synopsis ==
The plot revolves around Superman's efforts to defeat Dr. Abner Sedgwick, a ten-time Nobel Prize-losing scientist who seeks to avenge the scientific world's dismissal of his brilliance by attempting to destroy the world's symbol of good. Additionally, Superman comes into romantic conflict with Max Mencken, a columnist for the Daily Planet newspaper, who resents Lois Lane's attraction to Superman, and later teams up with Sedgwick to destroy Superman.

== Production history ==
The musical opened on Broadway at the Alvin Theatre on March 29, 1966. Directed by Harold Prince with choreography by Ernie Flatt, it starred Bob Holiday as Clark Kent and Superman, Patricia Marand as Lois Lane, Jack Cassidy as Max Mencken, and Linda Lavin as Sydney. The production received generally positive reviews, but it failed to catch on with the theater-going public and closed on July 17, 1966, after 129 performances. The musical received three Tony Award nominations, for Best Actor in a Musical (Cassidy), Best Featured Actor in a Musical (Michael O'Sullivan, playing the main villain), and Best Featured Actress in a Musical (Marand). One of the songs from the score, "You've Got Possibilities" (introduced by Lavin), had some success outside the show as a nightclub and cabaret standard. According to composer Charles Strouse, the official title of the show includes quotation marks: "It's a Bird It's a Plane It's Superman"; the program for the show does not include ellipses.

== Revivals ==
Two productions were staged the next year. Both the St. Louis Municipal Opera and the Kansas City Starlight Theatre (in 1966, titled Superman) re-staged the show, and Bob Holiday played Superman in both productions. Each was an open-air venue, requiring the use of a large crane to facilitate Superman's flights. Other cast members in these two productions were Karen Morrow as Sydney and Charles Nelson Reilly as Dr. Sedgwick.

The show was produced at the Goodspeed Opera House, East Haddam, Connecticut, from June through July 3, 1992, with Gary Jackson (as Superman), Jamie Ross, Veanne Cox and Gabriel Barre.

On May 14, 2007, the Reprise! Marvelous Musical Mondays program in Los Angeles presented a concert version of the musical. The cast featured Cheyenne Jackson as Superman, Jean Louisa Kelly as Lois Lane, Richard Kind as Dr. Sedgwick, Patrick Cassidy in his father's old role of Max Mencken, and composer Charles Strouse in a special appearance as Perry White. From June 15–17, the musical was presented in concert by the York Theatre's Musicals at MUFTI series in New York City, with Jackson, Kelly, and Strouse reprising their roles from the Los Angeles concert. Others in the cast included Lea DeLaria as Dr. Sedgwick, Shoshana Bean as Sydney, and David Rasche as Max Mencken. Bob Holiday, the original Broadway Superman, attended the June 16 matinee.

From June 18 to July 25, 2010, the Dallas Theater Center presented a revised version of It's a Bird..., starring Matt Cavenaugh in the dual role of Superman/Clark Kent, Zakiya Young as Lois Lane, Patrick Cassidy as Max Mencken, and Cavenaugh's real life wife Jenny Powers as Sydney Sharp (Cassidy developed laryngitis during the run of the show, and choreographer Joel Ferrell took over the role until Cassidy recovered). The new book for the show was written by playwright and comic book writer Roberto Aguirre-Sacasa. Kevin Moriarty, the Dallas Theater's artistic director, believed that the show's campy, pop art-inflected book had "not dated well" and approached Charles Strouse in 2008 for permission to revise the musical. Strouse acquiesced, and Moriarty hired Aguirre-Sacasa, a "lifelong fan" of the musical. Aguirre-Sacasa moved the musical's setting to 1939, and made the show's primary focus the "love triangle" between Clark Kent, Lois Lane, and Superman. Songs were cut, new songs were commissioned, and the order of songs was changed. In November 2009, Moriarty and Aguirre-Sacasa held a private reading of the revised book with the show's surviving creators, Strouse, Adams, and Benton.

A staged concert production took place as part of New York City Center's Encores! series from March 20–24, 2013. The cast included Edward Watts as Superman and Will Swenson as Max Mencken, with Jenny Powers playing Lois Lane. Powers had played Sydney Sharp in the 2010 Dallas revival. On March 23, Bob Holiday, who originated the role of Superman on Broadway, attended the show and met with the cast.

The show's UK premiere was played in London in March 2014 at Ye Olde Rose and Crown Theatre and was produced by All Star Productions. After positive reviews, "the real star of the show is Charles Strouse and Lee Adams' delightful score..." wrote the musicaltheatrereview.com, the show transferred to the Leicester Square Theatre in the West End for a limited run in February 2015.

In September 2016, there was the first production in the German language in Braunschweig, Germany. The OnStage - school of musical is producing the German Premiere at the Brunsviga.

== TV special ==
David Wilson and Lesley Ann Warren as Superman and Lois Lane in ABC's 1975 TV production of the musical.

It's a Bird...It's a Plane...It's Superman was made into a TV special, which first aired during a late-night timeslot on ABC on February 21, 1975. Filmed on video over the course of 3 days, the show was significantly shortened, the script significantly changed, and the ethnicity of a troupe of evildoers was changed from Chinese acrobats to Mafia-style gangsters. The musical numbers "Doing Good", "It's Super Nice", "So Long, Big Guy", and "We Don't Matter at All" were all dropped from this production, while the sound of the remaining musical numbers was updated to a more contemporary 1970s sensibility. In addition to these, a new musical number was made for the TV special: "It's a Great Country". The show was broadcast on the ABC network under its Wide World of Entertainment late-night umbrella title to poor critical reception. It starred David Wilson as Superman/Clark Kent, Lesley Ann Warren as Lois Lane, Loretta Swit as Sydney, David Wayne as Dr. Abner Sedgwick, Allen Ludden as Perry White, Kenneth Mars as Max Mencken, and Gary Owens as the old-time radio-style voiceover narrator. Viewers of this remake felt that the TV production lacked the energy of the original Broadway show.

== Casts ==
Role	Actor			
Role	Broadway (1966)	ABC-TV special (1975)	Encores! (2013)	West End (2015)
Max Mencken	Jack Cassidy	Kenneth Mars	Will Swenson	Paul Harwood
Dr. Abner Sedgwick	Michael O'Sullivan	David Wayne	David Pittu	Matthew Ibbotson
Superman / Clark Kent	Bob Holiday	David Wilson	Edward Watts	Craig Berry
Lois Lane	Patricia Marand	Lesley Ann Warren	Jenny Powers	Michelle LaFortune
Jim Morgan	Don Chastain		Adam Monley	Charlie Vose
Sydney	Linda Lavin	Loretta Swit	Alli Mauzey	Sarah Kennedy
Joe Ling	Joseph Gentry			
Father Ling	Jerry Fujikawa	Malachi Throne (Note: The troupe of villains, the acrobatic Flying Lings, were replaced by mafiosi led by a character played by Throne in the ABC-TV special.)	James Saito	Jonathan Chan
Ming Foo Ling	Michael Gentry			Jade Nelson
Tai Ling	Murphy James			Christina Harris
Perry White	Eric Mason	Allen Ludden		Andrew Truluck
Fan Po Ling	Juleste Salve			Thomas Widdop
Dong Ling	Bill Starr			Jonathan Chan

=== Additional cast members ===
Broadway (1966)

- William, the Exchange Student – Haruki Fujimoto
- Suspect #2 – Dick Miller
- Kirby Wire Operator/made Superman/Bob Holiday fly - Big Jim Saunders

West End (2015)

- Ding Ling - William M. Lee
- Ensemble / Dance Captain – Charlotte Debattista
- Ensemble - Vicky Longley

== Musical numbers ==
Act I

- Overture - Orchestra, Superman, Lois
- "Doing Good" - Superman
- "We Need Him" - Company, Lois, Max, Superman
- "It's Superman" - Lois
- "We Don't Matter at All" - Jim, Lois
- "Revenge" - Dr. Sedgwick
- "The Woman for the Man" - Max, Lois
- "You've Got Possibilities" - Sydney
- "What I've Always Wanted" - Lois
- "Everything's Easy When You Know How" - The Flying Lings
- "Revenge" (reprise) - Dr. Sedgwick
- "It's Super Nice" - Company

Act II

- Entr'acte - Orchestra
- "So Long Big Guy" - Max
- "The Strongest Man in the World" - Superman
- "Ooh, Do You Love You?" - Sydney
- "You've Got What I Need" - Dr. Sedgwick, Max
- "It's Superman" (reprise) - Lois, Superman, Sydney, Max, The Flying Lings, Jim, Company
- "I'm Not Finished Yet" - Lois
- "Pow! Bam! Zonk!" - Superman, The Flying Lings
- Finale - Company

"You've Got Possibilities" is generally considered the show's most memorable tune, and is the only one to be often performed outside the show. It was recorded in 1966 by Peggy Lee (on the album Big $pender) and Matt Monro (on the album Here's to My Lady), and has been performed and recorded by many other singers. It was also featured in a 2005 TV commercial for Pillsbury Grands! Biscuits.

The final part of the overture that featured the title song from the original cast album was used as the opening and closing theme music for all the newscasts on WTOP-TV/WDVM-TV (Channel 9, now WUSA-TV) in Washington, DC, from 1970 until 1982, along with a handful of other stations, most prominently New York City independent station WPIX-TV.

== Awards and nominations ==
=== Original Broadway production ===
Year	Award ceremony	Category	Nominee	Result
1966	Tony Award	Best Performance by a Leading Actor in a Musical	Jack Cassidy	Nominated
1966	Tony Award	Best Performance by a Featured Actor in a Musical	Michael O'Sullivan	Nominated
1966	Tony Award	Best Performance by a Featured Actress in a Musical	Patricia Marand	Nominated
