= Michael O'Sullivan (actor) =

American actor (1934–1971)

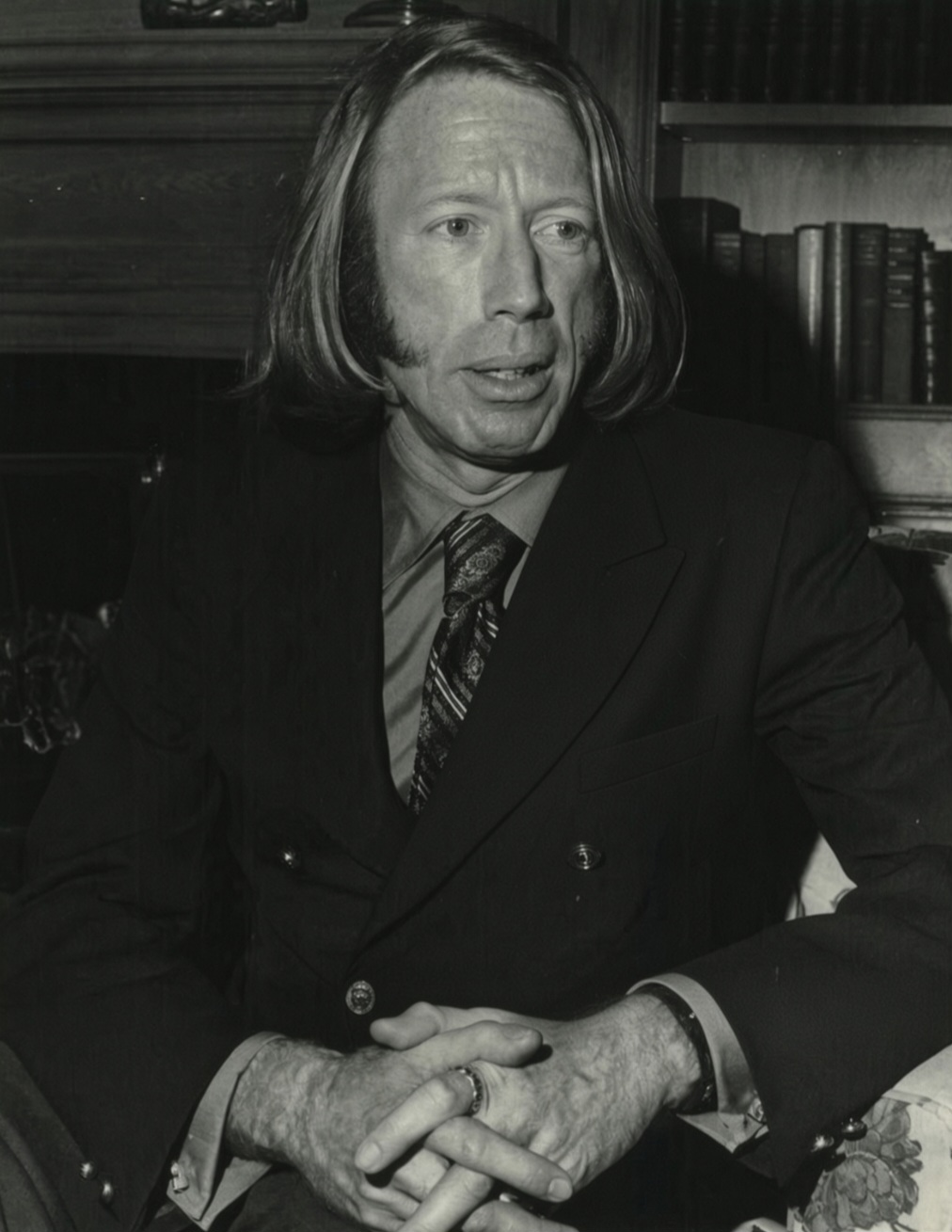
- O'Sullivan in 1971
- Born: March 4, 1934; U.S.
- Died: July 24, 1971 (aged 37); San Francisco, California, U.S.
- Occupation: Actor

Michael O'Sullivan (March 4, 1934 – July 24, 1971) was an American actor, "larger than life," who appeared on Broadway, at Lincoln Center, on the London stage, at San Francisco's Actor's Workshop and in many regional theaters and festivals of America throughout his brief career in the late 1950s and '60s. Arguably, his most famous role was in the 1968 film Hang 'Em High as Francis Elroy Duffy, a condemned prisoner whose final words before hanging warn of the dangers of drinking alcohol.

Clive Barnes of the New York Times designated O'Sullivan as "one of America's best young actors." Raised in Phoenix, Arizona, O'Sullivan studied and acted at the University of Denver and the Goodman Memorial Theater in Chicago. He then played major roles (including a remarkable "prancing" Pandarus in Troilus and Cressida) at the Oregon Shakespeare Festival in 1957 and 1958.

He was one of the ten actor corps hired by the San Francisco Actor's Workshop under a 1960 Ford Foundation grant to the company. In 1963, he won the Obie and the Laura D'Annunzio Awards for his portrayal of the Director in Pirandello's Six Characters in Search of an Author, directed by William Ball, a role he also performed in London, and in 1965 he performed the title role in Ball's staging of Molière's Tartuffe for the new Repertory Company of Lincoln Center, prompting critic Howard Taubman to praise O'Sullivan for showing "how a Molière performance can be larger than life, and not out of focus... [moving] between cringing, shuffling humility and outrageous arrogance."

O'Sullivan was a nominee for the Tony Award in 1966 for his role as the villain Sedgwick in the Broadway musical, It's a Bird, It's a Plane, It's Superman. His last New York appearance was in 1969 in Georges Feydeau's A Flea in Her Ear with the American Conservatory Theater at the ANTA Theater, and Clive Barnes said of that performance, "zany... galvanic lunacy... this is great farce acting."

In July 1971, Michael O'Sullivan was found dead in his San Francisco apartment at the age of 37, a bottle of sleeping pills by his side. It is not known whether his death was accidental or a suicide.

== Partial list of roles ==
At the University of Denver

- Reverend Paris in The Crucible
- Lighthouse Inspector in Thunder Rock
- Oedipus in Oedipus Rex
- Prometheus in Prometheus Bound
- Mephistopheles in Faust, (awarded "Best Actor of the Season")

The Goodman Memorial Theater, Chicago

- Beggar in Electra
- Prospector in The Madwoman of Chaillot

The Oregon Shakespeare Festival 1957

- Panthino in The Two Gentlemen of Verona
- Ceremon in Pericles
- Brabantio in Othello
- Cardinal Wolsey in Henry VIII
- Corin in As You Like It

The Oregon Shakespeare Festival 1958

- Pandarus in Troilus and Cressida
- Antonio in Much Ado About Nothing
- Old Gobbo in The Merchant of Venice

Actor's Workshop 1958–61

- Priam in Tiger at the Gates
- Nagg in Endgame
- Shanaar in Cock-a-Doodle Dandy
- Old Writer in Saint's Day
- Subtle in The Alchemist
- Patch Riley in A Touch of the Poet
- Grandfather in Twinkling of an Eye
- Lear in King Lear

New York

- The Director in Six Characters in Search of an Audience, 1963, Martinique Theater (Obie and Lola D'Annunzio Winner)
- Thomas Jefferson, et al. in In White America, 1963 Sheridan Square Playhouse
- Tartuffe in Tartuffe, 1965, ANTA

Stanford University Repertory Company, 1966–67

(He appeared "in Shakespeare in San Diego")

- Six roles in repertory for Stanford Rep

New York return

- Sedgewick in It's a Bird, It's a Plane, It's Superman, 1966, Alvin Theater (Broadway debut; Tony Award nominee)
- Malvolio in Love at Let Love (Musical based onTwelfth Night), 1968
- Count Alexei in The Bench, by N. R. Teitel, 1968, Gramercy Arts Theater
- Camille Chandel in A Flea in Her Ear, 1969, American Conservatory Theater of San Francisco at ANTA, New York

== Filmography ==
| Year | Title | Role | Notes | Ref. |
|---|---|---|---|---|
| 1966 | You're a Big Boy Now | Kurt Dougherty, the Albino Hypnotherpist | | |
| 1968 | Hang 'Em High | Francis Elroy Duffy, Prisoner | (final film role) | |

== See also ==
- List of unsolved deaths
