= Jack Cassidy =

American actor, singer and director (1927–1976)

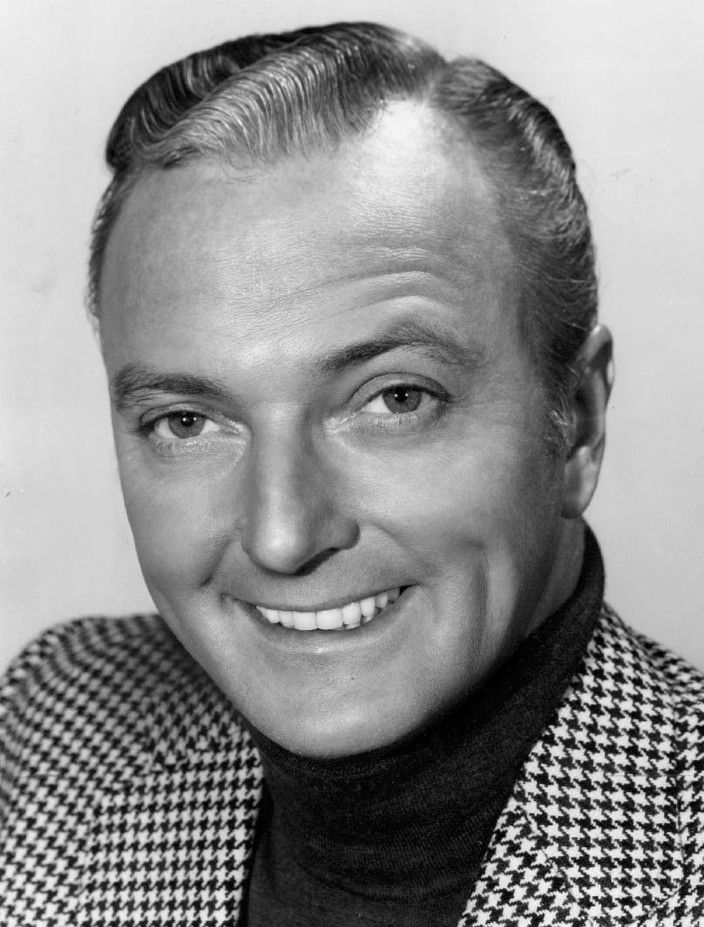
- Cassidy c. 1967
- Born: John Joseph Edward Cassidy; March 5, 1927; New York City, U.S.
- Died: December 12, 1976 (aged 49); West Hollywood, California, U.S.
- Occupations: Actor; singer; theatre director
- Years active: 1943–1976
- Spouses: Evelyn Ward (m. 1948; div. 1956) Shirley Jones (m. 1956; div. 1975)
- Children: 4; including David, Shaun and Patrick
- Relatives: Katie Cassidy (granddaughter)

John Joseph Edward Cassidy (March 5, 1927 – December 12, 1976) was an American actor, singer and theatre director. He received multiple Tony Award nominations and won a Tony Award as well as a Grammy Award for his work on the Broadway production of the musical She Loves Me. He also received two Primetime Emmy Award nominations. He was the father of teen idols David and Shaun Cassidy.

== Early life ==
Cassidy was born in New York City, the son of Charlotte (née Koehler) and William Cassidy. He was the youngest of five children. His father, an engineer at the Long Island Rail Road, was of Irish descent and his mother was of German ancestry.

== Career ==
Cassidy achieved success as a musical performer on Broadway. He appeared in Alive and Kicking, Wish You Were Here, Shangri-La, Maggie Flynn, Fade Out – Fade In, It's a Bird...It's a Plane...It's Superman, and She Loves Me, for which he won a Tony Award. He also received Emmy Award nominations for his television performances in the 1967-68 CBS Television Network series He & She and The Andersonville Trial.

On television, he became a frequent guest star, appearing in such programs as The Alfred Hitchcock Hour, Gunsmoke, Bewitched, Get Smart, That Girl, Hawaii Five-O, Cannon, Match Game, McCloud, and Barnaby Jones for an episode titled "Murder in the Doll's House" (1973). Cassidy also appeared three times as a murderer on Columbo in the episodes "Murder By the Book" (1971, directed by the not-yet-famous Steven Spielberg, with teleplay by a young Steven Bochco), "Publish or Perish" (1974), and "Now You See Him..." (1976).

He co-starred with Ronnie Schell in a television revival of Hellzapoppin'. Cassidy also co-starred as an informer in the movie The Eiger Sanction with Clint Eastwood and provided the voice of Bob Cratchit for the pioneering animated television special Mister Magoo's Christmas Carol.

His frequent professional persona was an urbane, witty, confident egotist with a dramatic flair, much in the manner of Broadway actor Frank Fay. Cassidy perfected this character to the extent that he was cast as John Barrymore in the feature film W.C. Fields and Me.

The role of the vain, shallow, buffoon-like newsman Ted Baxter on TV's The Mary Tyler Moore Show (1970–1977) was reportedly written with Cassidy in mind. Cassidy had played a similar buffoonish character in the 1967–1968 sitcom He & She, but he turned down the role, feeling that it was not right for him; the part went to Ted Knight. Cassidy later appeared as a guest star in a 1971 episode as Ted's highly competitive and equally egotistical brother Hal.

== Personal life ==
=== Marriages and children ===
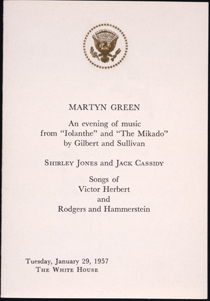
A program featuring Cassidy and Jones at the White House in 1957

Cassidy was married twice. His first marriage in 1948 was to actress Evelyn Ward. Together they had a son, David, who later became a teen idol. They divorced in 1956 and in the same year Cassidy married singer and actress Shirley Jones. Cassidy and Jones had three sons, Shaun, Patrick, and Ryan. Cassidy's eldest son, David, later starred with Jones in the musical sitcom The Partridge Family. Son Shaun also became a teen idol in the late 1970s, starring in The Hardy Boys series, and producing four top-40 records. Jones and Cassidy divorced in 1975.

Cassidy had 12 grandchildren: Katie Cassidy and Beau by his first son David; Caitlin, Jake, Juliet, Caleb, Roan, Lila, and Mairin Cassidy by son Shaun; Cole and Jack by son Patrick; and, Meghan Mae by son Ryan. His grandson, Jack Cassidy, was a contestant on the singing competition television show The Voice in 2017.

=== Mental health ===
In his 1994 autobiography, C'Mon, Get Happy, Cassidy's eldest son David wrote that he became increasingly concerned about his father in the last years of his life. The elder Cassidy, who suffered from bipolar disorder and alcoholism, was displaying increasingly erratic behavior. In 1974, his neighbors were shocked to see him fully naked, watering his front lawn in the middle of the afternoon. Cassidy's second wife, Shirley Jones, described a similar incident when she found him sitting naked in a corner of their house, reading a book. Jones said to him that they had to get ready to do a show, and he calmly looked up and said, "I know now that I'm Christ". In December 1974, Cassidy was hospitalized in a psychiatric facility for 48 hours. At that time, Jones found out that he had been previously diagnosed with bipolar disorder.

=== Sexuality ===
David Cassidy said his father was bisexual, citing personal accounts and reports, both anecdotal and published, of his father's same-sex affairs, something neither he nor his siblings knew until after their father's death. In her 2013 memoir, Shirley Jones wrote that Cassidy had many same-sex affairs, including one with Cole Porter.

== Death ==
On December 11, 1976, Cassidy invited his ex-wife, Shirley Jones, to his home, an apartment in West Hollywood, California, for drinks, but she declined.

Early the next morning, Cassidy lit a cigarette and fell asleep on his Naugahyde couch. He dropped the cigarette, igniting the couch. The flames spread throughout the apartment and building. At 6:15 a.m., the blaze was discovered by Deputy Sheriff John DiMatteo, who evacuated the building, and entered Cassidy's apartment. A charred body was found near the front door of the apartment among the ashes, and was identified as Cassidy's by dental records and a signet ring that he wore, bearing the Cassidy family crest. His remains were cremated and scattered in the Pacific Ocean.

== Filmography ==
=== Film ===
Year	Title	Role	Notes
1961	Look in Any Window	Gareth Lowell	
1962	The Chapman Report	Ted Dyson	
1970	The Cockeyed Cowboys of Calico County	Roger Hand	
1971	Bunny O'Hare	Lieutenant Greeley	
1975	The Eiger Sanction	Miles Mellough	
1976	W. C. Fields and Me	John Barrymore	
1977	The Private Files of J. Edgar Hoover	Damon Runyon	Posthumous release

=== Television ===
Year	Title	Role	Notes
1957	The United States Steel Hour	Performer	Season 4 Episode 13: "Shadow of Evil"
1957	Lux Video Theatre	Dr. Frederick Steele	Season 7 Episode 21: "Dark Victory"
1957	Lux Video Theatre	Denis	Season 7 Episode 49: "Last Act"
1958	Richard Diamond, Private Detective	Danny Fortune	Season 2 Episode 17: "The Percentage Takers"
1958	Gunsmoke	Marcus France	Season 3 Episode 39: "The Gentleman"
1960	The Chevy Mystery Show	David Townsend	Season 1 Episode 14: "Femme Fatale"
1961	Hawaiian Eye	Maurice Clifford	Season 3 Episode 14: "Concert in Hawaii"
1961	Maverick	Roger Cushman	Season 5 Episode 2: "The Art Lovers"
1961	Alfred Hitchcock Presents	Mark Lansing	Season 6 Episode 29: "The Pearl Necklace"
1961	General Electric Theater	Alan Richards	Season 9 Episode 28: "Sis Bowls 'Em Over"
1961	Lock-Up	Vincent Gibson	Season 2 Episode 28: "Two Wrongs"
1961	Wagon Train	Dan Palmer	Season 4 Episode 24: "The Nancy Palmer Story"
1962	Surfside 6	Val Morton	Season 2 Episode 21: "Who is Sylvia?"
1962	The Everglades	Ron Fairburn	Season 1 Episode 18: "Black Honeymoon"
1962	FBI Code 98	Walter Macklin	Television Movie
1962	77 Sunset Strip	Dick Arnador	Season 4 Episode 20: "The Bridal Trail Caper"
1961	Bronco	Edward Miller	Season 4 Episode 5: "The Harrigan"
1962	Bronco	Marshal Bill Hickok	Season 4 Episode 13: "One Evening in Abilene"
1962	The Dick Powell Show	Roth	Season 2 Episode 13: "The Big Day"
1962	Mister Magoo's Christmas Carol	Bob Cratchit (voice)	Television Movie
1962	Hennesey	Chaplain	Season 3 Episode 32: "I Thee Wed"
1963	The Wide Country	Jerry Manning	Season 1 Episode 21: "The Judas Ghost"
1964	Mr. Broadway	Allan	Season 1 Episode 6: "The He-She Chemistry"
1964	Famous Adventures of Mr. Magoo	voice	Television Movie
1965	The Lucy Show	Professor Zoorkin	Season 4 Episode 10: "Lucy and the Undercover Agent"
1965	The Alfred Hitchcock Hour	Arthur Mannix	Season 3 Episode 21: "The Photographer and the Undertaker"
1967	Coronet Blue	Spangler	Season 1 Episode 7: "A Charade for Murder"
1967	The Girl from U.N.C.L.E.	Rock Mussin	Season 1 Episode 21: "The Carpathian Caper Affair"
1967	I Spy	Nick Fleming	Season 2 Episode 19: "The Trouble with Temple"
1967–1968	He & She	Oscar North	26 episodes
1968	Mouse on the Mayflower	John Alden, voice	Rankin-Bass animated holiday TV special
1968	Get Smart	Mr. Bob	Season 4 Episode 8: "The Return of the Ancient Mariner"
1968	Bewitched	Rance Butler	Season 5 Episode 2: "Samantha Goes South for a Spell"
1969	That Girl	Marty Haines	Season 4 Episode 12: "She Never Had the Vegas Notion"
1969	That Girl	Marty Haines	Season 4 Episode 13: "She Never Had the Vegas Notion Part Two"
1970	Bewitched	George Dinsdale	Season 6 Episode 26: "A Chance on Love"
1970	The Governor & J.J.	Mark Ellison	Season 2 Episode 9: "The Making of the Governor"
1970	Matt Lincoln	Doug Conway	Season 1 Episode 3: "Nina"
1970	George M!	Jeremiah "Jerry" Cohan	Television Movie
1970	The Andersonville Trial	Otis Baker	PBS film version of 1959 Broadway play by Saul Levitt
1970	Love, American Style	Chuck Fuller	Season 1 Episode 20 (segment: "Love and the Many Married Couple")
1971	Love, American Style	Fred	Season 2 Episode 18 (segment: "Love and the Big Game")
1971	Sarge	John Michael O'Flaherty	Season 1 Episode 6: "The Eleven O'Clock War"
1971	Bonanza	Kevin O'Casey	Season 13 Episode 6: "Cassie"
1971	The Mary Tyler Moore Show	Hal Baxter	Season 2 Episode 6: "Cover Boy"
1971	Alias Smith and Jones	Harry Wagener	Season 2 Episode 2: "How to Rob a Bank in One Hard Lesson"
1971	Columbo	Ken Franklin	Season 1 Episode 1: "Murder by the Book"
1971	The Powder Room	Performer	Television Movie
1971	Night Gallery	Marius Davis	Season 1 Episode 6 (segment: "The Last Laurel")
1971	The Mod Squad	Perry Lerriko	Season 3 Episode 15: "Kicks Incorporated"
1972	Love, American Style	Frank	Season 4 Episode 1 (segment: "Love and the Know-It-All")
1972	Mission: Impossible	Orin Kerr	Season 6 Episode 21: "Casino"
1972	Your Money or Your Wife	Josh Darwin	Television Movie
1972	Banyon	Grey Gloves	Season 1 Episode 7: "Dead End"
1973	Orson Welles Great Mysteries	Pennington	Season 1 Episode 14: "For Sale - Silence"
1973	Barnaby Jones	Craig Woodridge	Season 1 Episode 7: "Murder in the Doll's House"
1973	A Time for Love	Tom Pierson	Television Movie
1974	Fools, Females and Fun	Danny Holliday	Television Movie
1974	The Phantom of Hollywood	Otto Vonner / Karl Vonner	Television Movie
1974	Great Performances	Paul Sears	Season 2 Episode 2: "June Moon"
1974	Columbo	Riley Greenleaf	Season 3 Episode 5: "Publish or Perish"
1974	Cannon	General James O'Hara	Season 3 Episode 16: "Photo Finish"
1975	Hawaii Five-O	Orrin Morwood	Season 8 Episode 10: "How to Steal a Submarine"
1975	Matt Helm	Buckman	Season 1 Episode 5: "Murder on Ice"
1975	Knuckle	Patrick Delafield	Television Movie
1975	Death Among Friends	Chico Donovan	Television Movie
1976	Columbo	The Great Santini	Season 5 Episode 5: "Now You See Him..."
1977	McCloud	Lord Charles Bridges	Season 7 Episode 5: "London Bridges" (Posthumous release)
1977	Benny and Barney: Las Vegas Undercover	Jules Rosen	Television Movie (Posthumous release)
1977	The Feather and Father Gang	Bishop	Season 1 Episode 13: "The Judas Bug" (Posthumous release)

== Stage ==
Source: Playbill Vault

=== Broadway ===
Year	Title	Role	Venue
1943	Something for the Boys	chorus	Alvin Theatre
1944	Sadie Thompson	chorus	Alvin Theatre
1946	Around the World	chorus	Adelphi Theatre
1947	Music in My Heart	chorus	Adelphi Theatre
1948	Small Wonder	ensemble	Coronet Theatre
1948	Inside U.S.A.	chorus	Majestic Theatre
1949	Theater '49	ensemble	General Artists Corporation NYC
1952	South Pacific	Richard West	Majestic Theatre
1952	Wish You Were Here	Chick Miller	Imperial Theatre
1954	Sandhog	Johnny O'Sullivan	Phoenix Theatre
1956	Shangri-La	Charles Mallinson	Winter Garden Theatre
1957	The Beggar's Opera	MacHeath	New York City Center
1963	She Loves Me	Steven Kodaly	Eugene O'Neill Theatre
1964	Fade Out – Fade In	Byron Prong	Mark Hellinger Theatre
1966	It's a Bird...It's a Plane...It's Superman	Max Mencken	Alvin Theatre
1968	Maggie Flynn	Phineas Flynn	ANTA Theatre
1969	The Mundy Scheme	Mick Moloney	Royale Theatre
1973	Sondheim: A Musical Tribute	Performer	Concert, Shubert Theater
1975	Murder Among Friends	Palmer Forrester	Biltmore Theatre

=== Elsewhere ===
Year	Title	Role	Venue
1956	Oklahoma!	Curly	European tour
1958	Wonderful Town	Robert Baker	Brussels World's Fair, Belgium
1958	Wonderful Town	Robert Baker	London, United Kingdom
1959	Wish You Were Here	Chick Miller	Dallas, Texas
1959	Epitaph for George Dillon	George Dillon	Los Angeles, California
1962	Gypsy	Herbie	Dallas, Texas
1965	Mary, Mary	Dirk Winsten	National tour
1965	Camelot	Lancelot	National tour
1967	Wait Until Dark	Roat	National tour
1972	The Marriage Band	Performer	Las Vegas, Nevada; National tour

== Awards and nominations ==
Year	Award	Category	Nominated work	Result	Ref.
1964	Grammy Awards	Best Score From an Original Cast Show Album	She Loves Me	Won	
1964	Tony Awards	Best Supporting or Featured Actor in a Musical	She Loves Me	Won	
1965	Tony Awards	Best Supporting or Featured Actor in a Musical	Fade Out - Fade In	Nominated	
1966	Tony Awards	Best Leading Actor in Musical	It's a Bird, It's a Plane, It's Superman	Nominated	
1969	Tony Awards	Best Leading Actor in Musical	Maggie Flynn	Nominated	
1968	Primetime Emmy Awards	Outstanding Performance by an Actor in a Supporting Role in a Comedy	He & She	Nominated	
1971	Primetime Emmy Awards	Outstanding Single Performance by an Actor in a Leading Role	The Andersonville Trial	Nominated	

== Discography ==
Shirley Jones and Jack Cassidy albums

- Speaking of Love (1957) Columbia Records
- Brigadoon (1957) Columbia Records
- With Love from Hollywood (1958) Columbia
- Marriage Type Love (1959) RCA Records
- Maggie Flynn (1968) RCA Records
- Showtunes (1995) Sony Music Entertainment
- Essential Masters (2011) Master Classics Records
- Marriage Type Love (2014) Columbia Masterworks Records

Guest appearances

- Free to Be... You and Me (1972) Bell Records (song: "Girl Land" with Shirley Jones)
